= List of the oldest buildings in New York =

This article attempts to list the oldest buildings in the state of New York, including the oldest houses and any other surviving structures. Some dates are approximate and based on architectural studies and historical records; other dates are based on dendrochronology. All entries should include citation with reference to: architectural features indicative of the date of construction; a report by an architectural historian; or dendrochronology.

Sites on the list are generally from the First Period of American architecture. If the exact year of initial construction is estimated, it will be shown as a range of dates.

== List ==
Building	Image	Location	First built	Notes
Wyckoff House		East Flatbush, Brooklyn	1652	Oldest surviving structure in Brooklyn, New York City, and New York. Dated by dendrochronology.
Riker–Lent–Smith Homestead	Lent Homestead 02	East Elmhurst, Queens	1656	Oldest surviving structure in Queens, and oldest remaining private residence in New York.
Peter Crippen House		Huntington	c. 1658	Oldest home on Long Island. Recently in a state of disrepair, but is set to be taken apart and rebuilt in the Huntington African American Museum
Zachariah Hawkins House		Stony Brook	c. 1660	
Bowne House		Flushing, Queens	c. 1661	Once hosted a well-known Quaker meeting.
Billiou–Stillwell–Perine House		Dongan Hills, Staten Island	c. 1662	Oldest surviving structure in Staten Island
Klinkenberg(h) Bouwerij		Coxsackie	c. 1663	One of oldest surviving Dutch homes north of greater New York City area. On the western shore of Hudson River. Klinkenberg(h) was translated by Pelletrau in Beer's History of Greene County from Old Dutch as "Echo Hill". On August 25, 1670, Jurian Teunisse Tappen sold his one third of the Rensselaerswyck patroonship to Abraham Staats and Johannes Provoost. The deed in the 1670 sale to Staats and Provoost, later known as The Loonenburg patent, mentions a barn, indicating a preceding settlement. Notable owners: On September 6, 1694, reports the sale of Klinkenberg was sold to Jacob Casperson Hallenbeck; it became “the original seat of the family of Hallenbecks” for several generations. During the Revolutionary War, Klinkenberg was inhabited by the Provoost family, who were “noted tories.” In Klinkenberg was referenced as “George Houghtaling's house ref: Pelletreau's chapter “Coxsackie” in "Beers History of Greene County", p 4, 1884. Since 1962, property of family of Harold Oaklander and Isabelle Rapin.
Bronck House		Coxsackie	1663	
Brewster House		East Setauket	1665	
Cock-Cornelius House		Locust Valley	1668	
Robert Coles Homestead		Glen Cove	1668	In May 1668, Joseph Carpenter of Rhode Island negotiated with the Matinecock Indians to purchase several hundred acres of land on which to build a saw mill and grist mill in what was then Musketa Cove. Robert Coles was one of the "Five Proprietors of the Musketa Cove Patent" and was the first to build his homestead at what is now 34 The Place. He and his wife, Mercy Wright of Oyster Bay, had 9 children and lived in the eastern-most wing of the existing property which still stands today.
Cubberly-Britton Cottage		Richmondtown, Staten Island	1670	
Timothy Knapp House		Rye	1670	Listed on National Register of Historic Places
Abraham Manee House		Prince's Bay, Staten Island	1670	
Jans Martense Schenck house		Brooklyn	1675	Originally in Flatlands; installed within the Brooklyn Museum 1964
Hewlett-Munson-Williams House	The historic Hewlett-Munson-Williams House at the Elderfields Preserve in Flower Hill, Long Island, New York on May 23, 2022.	Flower Hill	1675	Presently in the Elderfields Preserve.
Old Senate House		Kingston	1676	New York State Constitution written and signed here
Joshua Wells House	Joshua-wells	Cutchogue	c. 1680	Home moved twice since its c. 1680 construction and 1815 remodeling.
Conference House		Tottenville, Staten Island	1680	Listed as a National Historic Landmark
Mulford Farmhouse	PantigoWindmill at HomeSweetHome 20180916 072921	East Hampton	1680	Presently ran as a museum.
Van Nostrand-Starkins House		Roslyn	1680	Main Street Historic District (Roslyn, New York)
Chichester's Inn		West Hills	1680	Listed on National Register of Historic Places. Also known as the 'Peace and Plenty Inn'.
Bevier House Museum		Marbletown	1680	Currently houses the Ulster County Historical Society
Philipse Manor Hall		Yonkers	1682	Oldest surviving structure in Westchester County.
Old Halsey House		Southampton	1688	1688 According to dendrochronology survey by Oxford, 1683 build date according to the local historical society in Southampton http://www.southamptonhistoricalmuseum.org/
Bedell Family Farm House		Bellmore	1689	Farmhouse built by early settler Robert Bedell for his son John and his wife Sarah Southard. Originally located on Merrick Boulevard.
Alice Austen House		Rosebank, Staten Island	1690	Built by a Dutch merchant then remodeled in the Gothic Revival Style in 1844
Cornell-Van Nostrand House		Manhasset Hills	1690	Also known as the Schumacher House
Nathaniel Longbotham House	Nathaniel Longbotham House, original structure	Stony Brook	<1690	The original date of the homes construction is unknown, but believed to be before 1690.
Jeremiah Conklin House		Amagansett	1690	Built by Jeremiah Conkling and his wife Mary, daughter of Lion Gardiner, first English settler of New York colony
Joseph Whitman House		West Hills	1692	
Haviland-Davison Grist Mill	Haviland-Davison Grist Mill-4	East Rockaway	1693	Presently runs as the East Rockaway Grist Mill Museum.
Philipsburg Manor House	Philipsburg Manor 2	Sleepy Hollow	1693	Part of the early estate Philipsburg Manor
Terry-Ketcham Inn	Terry-Ketcham Inn; Northeast shot	Center Moriches	c. 1693	Expanded in 1710 and later 1790.
Old Quaker Meeting House		Flushing, Queens	1694	Oldest religious building in New York City still standing
Thomas Strong House	Thomas-strong-house	Wainscott	1695	Continually lived in by the same family for eight generations since construction.
Joachim Staats House		Staats Island, Rensselaer County	1696	Called Hoogebergh, meaning "high hill", the house has remained the family homestead since it was erected by Joachim Staats in 1696. William Staats, a 9th generation Hoogebergh inhabitant, details the history of the house and chronicles the family anecdotes of the 20th century in his book, Three Centuries on the Hudson River.
Sagtikos Manor	Sagtikos Manor from NY 27A	West Bay Shore	c. 1697	Believed to have been resided in by George Washington.
Old Dutch Church of Sleepy Hollow		Sleepy Hollow	1697	Possibly the oldest surviving church in the state. May date to 1685.
Old House		Cutchogue	1699	Dated by dendrochronology
De Wint House		Tappan	1700	Washington Revolutionary headquarters; one of the oldest surviving buildings in Rockland County
Ezra Carll Homestead		South Huntington	1700	
Jarvis-Fleet House		Huntington	1700	
Lispenard–Rodman–Davenport House		New Rochelle	1700	
Tobias van Steenburgh House		Kingston	c. 1700	One of the few buildings in Kingston not burned in 1777 by British troops (though most of the burned stone houses were repaired and remain).
Ezra Carll Homestead	Ezra Carll Homestead; South Huntington-4; 2017-11-16	South Huntington	c. 1700	
Treasure House		Richmondtown, Staten Island	1700	
John Wood House		Huntington Station	1704	Built by a Dutch merchant then remodeled in the Gothic Revival Style in 1844
Mabee House		Rotterdam	1705	The oldest house in the Mohawk Valley
Jan Van Loon House		Athens	1706	One of the oldest houses in Greene County
Crailo		Rensselaer	1707	Residence of Hendrick van Rensselaer
Obadiah Smith House	Obadiah Smith House, San Remo, NY; IN COLOR!	Kings Park	1708	House museum ran by the Smithtown Historical Society
Thompson House	Setauket Thompson House	Setauket	1709	One of Long Island's oldest Saltbox homes
Madam Brett Homestead		Beacon	1709	Oldest building in Dutchess County, first house on Rombout Patent, on National Register
Vander Ende-Onderdonk House	Vander Ende-Onderdonk House	Ridgewood, Queens	c. 1709	Original house on the site was built in 1661; construction of current house began in 1709. Oldest Dutch Colonial stone house in New York City.
Gomez Mill House		Marlboro	1712	Oldest known extant residence of a Jewish American
Lewis Pintard House		New Rochelle	1710	Home of Revolutionary War patriot Lewis Pintard
East Farm	East Farm farmhouse, Head of the Harbor	Head of The Harbor	1710	First buildings on the property constructed in 1689, with the main home in 1710.
Roslyn Grist Mill	Roslyn Grist Mill from Viaduct 2016	Roslyn	c. 1715–1741	One of the few Dutch colonial commercial frame buildings left in the US.
Terry-Mulford House	Peaken's Tavern, aka Terry-Mulford House	Orient	1716	Later wings built in 1800 and early 1900s.
Brinckerhoff House		Fishkill	1717	Originally two-room stone cottage used as a trading post and later rebuilt as a mansion & now converted to an Inn.
Fraunces Tavern		Lower Manhattan	1719	Etienne "Stephen" DeLancey built the current building as his house; tavern since 1762
Pieter Winne House		Selkirk	1720	Purportedly the oldest house in the Town of Bethlehem
Ariaanje Coeymans House		Coeymans	1720	There is another Coeymans house a mile south of this one, on the Hannacroix Creek. Date unknown.
Hendrick I. Lott House		Marine Park, Brooklyn	1720	
Mudge Farmhouse	Mudge Farmhouse 2016	Roslyn Harbor	1720	Original Dutch home that was moved in 1920.
Jan Van Hoesen House		Claverack	c. 1720	
Earle-Wightman House		Oyster Bay	c. 1720	
Town Doctors' House and Site	Southold Town Doctor's House	Southold	c. 1720	On-site is the Bilberry Swamp, in which the earliest Euro-American occupation occurred.
John Oakley House		West Hills	c. 1720	The original structure was built about 1720 and expanded in the 1780s.
Josiah Woodhull House	Josiah Woodhull House October 2018	East Shoreham / Wading River	c. 1720	Built by the founder of Brookhaven, and the oldest home in its area.
Bull Stone House		Hamptonburgh	1720s	Property also contains the oldest intact Dutch barn in the state
Thomas Dodge Homestead		Port Washington	1721	The original farmhouse was built in 1721 with additions completed in 1750 and 1903
Kreuzer-Pelton House		West New Brighton, Staten Island	1722	
Albertus Van Loon House		Athens	1724	Possibly the second-oldest house in Greene County
Heermance Farmhouse		Red Hook	1725	Oldest house in the Town of Red Hook. Retains much original detail in the interior. Original woodwork including panelling, tiger maple bannister and granary door.
Amelia Cottage	Amy-cottage	Amangasset	1725	Built for Catherine Schellinger and was moved in 1794.
Matinecock Friends Meetinghouse	MatinecockMeetingHouse	Matinecock	1725	Former Quaker Meeting House
William Sidney Mount House	William-sydney-mount-house	Stony Brook	1725	Largely expanded in 1810 and presently owned by the Long Island Museum
Abraham Yates House		Schenectady	c. 1725	Possibly the oldest house in Schenectady
French Castle at Fort Niagara		Porter	1726	Oldest building on the Great Lakes, oldest building in Western New York.
48 Hudson Avenue		Albany	1728	Oldest stand-alone structure in Albany
Caroline Church	The Caroline Church of Brookhaven, in Setauket, NY	Setauket	1729	Parish house built 1905, Cemetery beginning in 1734, and barn built 1893 all exist along with the Caroline Church.
Benner House		Rhinebeck	1730	Oldest house in the village; a rare example of German vernacular architecture, and the sole remaining house in Dutchess County with a one-room floorplan built to German traditions rather than Dutch. Here was held the first Methodist church services in the town conducted by the Rev. Freeborn Garrettson from 1791 to 1793.
Peter Houseman House	PETER HOUSEMAN HOUSE, WESTERLEIGH, RICHMOND COUNTY, NY	Westerleigh, Staten Island.	1730	One section of the house built in 1730, the other c. 1760.
King Mansion		Jamaica, Queens	1730	The rear section of the house dates to 1730, the left section to 1755, the main structure (right section) to 1806.
Sherwood-Jayne House	Sherwood-Jayne House; East Setauket-3	East Setauket	1730	House was altered multiple times from its first construction up until 1940.
Silas Sammis House	Silas Sammis House, West Neck Avenue and Sammis Road, Huntington, Suffolk County, NY HABS NY,52-HUNTO.V,1-2	Huntington	c. 1730	Out of the two wings on the house, the east is the original.
Suydam House		Centerport	c. 1730	
Scott-Edwards House	SCOTT-EDWARDS HOUSE, WEST NEW BRIGHTEN, RICHMOND COUNTY, NY	West New Brighton, Staten Island	c. 1730	Extensively remodeled in the 1840s to be Greek Revival style.
Brookville Reformed Church	Picture	Brookville	1732	One of the oldest running church congregations in the US, and the oldest church on Long Island
John Rogers House		Dix Hills	1732	
Queen Anne Parsonage		Fort Hunter	1734	
Cornelius Van Wyck House		Douglaston, Queens	1735	
Sands-Willets Homestead	The Sands–Willets House in Flower Hill, NY on May 6, 2023.	Flower Hill	c. 1735	Presently ran by the Cow Neck Peninsula Historical Society
Nicoll-Sill House – Bethlehem House		Selkirk	c. 1735	Home of Rensselaer Nicoll and Elizabeth Salisbury Nicoll
St. James Church		Elmhurst, Queens	1736	
Sylvester Manor	Miss Cornelia Horsford, Sylvester Manor, residence in Shelter Island Heights, New York. LOC gsc.5a01810	Shelter Island	c. 1737	Property has existed since around 1652. But the Manor home was constructed in 1737.
Raynham Hal	Oyster Bay Raynham Hall 2008	Oyster Bay	1738	Built for Townsend family, whom were part of the George Washington's Culper Ring of spies.
Jacob Smith House		West Hills	c. 1740	The home consists of a three-bay, 1 1/2-story saltbox built about 1740 and a five-bay, 1 1/2-story dwelling with a shed roof wing added about 1830.
Lake-Tysen House		Oakwood, Staten Island	1740	
James Havens Homestead	James-havens-house	Shelter Island	1743	Shelter Island Historical Society runs it as a museum
Joost Van Nuyse House	Van Nuyse House Brooklyn 1	Flatlands, Brooklyn.	1744	Expanded in 1793.
Kasparus Westervelt House		Poughkeepsie	1745	
Beachbend		Nissequogue	1747	Large alterations completed in 1924.
Stoothoff–Baxter–Kouwenhaven House		Flatlands, Brooklyn	1747	
Jagger House		Westhampton	c. 1748	
Van Cortlandt House		Van Cortlandt Park	1748	Oldest house in the Bronx
Creedmoor (Cornell) Farmhouse		Glen Oaks, Queens	1750	
David Conklin House		Huntington	c. 1750	
Joseph Buffett House	Joseph Buffett House	Cold Spring Harbor	c. 1750	One of the oldest intact residences in Cold Spring Harbor
Ireland-Gardiner Farm		Greenlawn	c. 1750	
Foster-Meeker House	Foster Meeker House Westhampton Beach, NY	Westhampton Beach	c. 1750	While almost demolished in 2008, it has recently been saved and preserved.
Isaac Losee House		Huntington	c. 1750	One of the oldest private residences on Long Island
Samuel Landon House	Samuel-landon	Southold	c. 1750	In 1760, an estimated 5 slaves resided here.
Wilson House		Oyster Bay	c. 1750	Saltbox home built for Harry Wilson.
Davis Town Meeting House	Davis Meeting House 2	Coram	c. 1750	In the 1800s, the building was used as a town hall for Brookhaven.
Carll House	380 Deer Park Avenue-2	Dix Hills	c. 1750	
Henry Smith Farmstead		Huntington Station	1750	Built about 1750 and remodelled in the 1860s
Benjamin King Woodhull House	Benjamin King Woodhull House, Wading River, NY	Wading River	1750	Greek revival residence and later extended.
Steenburgh Tavern		Rhinebeck	1750	German vernacular stone house built into a hillside with an unusual sweeping Dutch roof
Stony Brook Grist Mill	Stony Brook Grist Mill 2	Stony Brook	1751	Mill dates back to 1699, though the present day structure was constructed in 1751.
William Arthur House		Smithtown	1752	NY-25A and Redwood Lane 40°51′18.6″N 73°11′57.3″W
Stone Jug		Clermont	1752	Contributing property to the Hudson River Historic District
The Old 76 House		Tappan	1754	Oldest surviving building in Rockland County; third oldest public house in America; Maj. John Andre held before trial and hanging in Tappan
Christopher House		Richmondtown, Staten Island	1756	
Valentine–Varian House		Norwood, Bronx	1758	Second oldest house in the Bronx
Palatine German Wohleben House		Herkimer	1760	
Bryant Skidmore House		Northport	1761	Located near Great Cow Harbor and Red Hook.
Strawberry Hill		Rhinebeck	1762	The National Register of Historic Places called this the most monumental stone farmhouse in Northern Dutchess County. Built by Henry Beekman in 1762.
St. Paul's Chapel		Lower Manhattan	1764	Third oldest surviving church in New York City, after the Flushing Friends Meeting House (1694) and St. Andrew's Church, Staten Island (1709).
Morris–Jumel Mansion		Upper Manhattan	1765	
B. Ketchum House	B-Ketchum House, Fort Salonga; October 2018	Huntington	1765	Shingle home still a private residence. Interestingly, no alterations have been made since.
St. John's Episcopal Church	St. John's Episcopal Church and Cemetery 20211020 180946511	Oakdale	1765	Enlarged in 1843, and restored in 1962.
Hallock Homestead	Hallock-Homestead	Northville	1765	Museum part of the Hallock State Park Preserve
Wyckoff-Bennett Homestead		Flatlands, Brooklyn	1766	
St. Paul's Chapel	St. Paul's Chapel, Manhattan, New York (7237179780)	Lower Manhattan	1766	Oldest surviving church building in Manhattan
Beekman Arms and Delamater Inn		Rhinebeck	1766	Oldest surviving inn in America and oldest structure in the village.
Joseph Lloyd House	Joseph Lloyd Manor Today	Lloyd Harbor	1766-1767	Presently ran by Preservation Long Island.
Rock Hall	Rock Hall Museum in Lawrence New York	Lawrence	1767	
Indian Castle Church		Danube	1769	Only colonial Indian missionary church surviving in the state, and the only Iroquois building surviving from its time
Old Burr Farm		Comac	1769	Earliest Surviving House (C. 1769) Associated With The Burr Family, One of Comac's Leading Families From the 18th Thru 20th Centuries.
Voorlezer's House		Richmondtown, Staten Island	c. 1769	Long held to be the oldest schoolhouse in America, although the original schoolhouse built on the property does not survive. Traditionally dated to 1695/6.
Boehm-Frost House		Richmondtown, Staten Island	1770	
Tysen-Neville House		New Brighton, Staten Island	1700	Built in red, quarried sandstone in 1770.
Michael Remp House	Michael Remp House Down Godfrey Lane, Greenlawn, NY	Greenlawn	c. 1770	Also referred to as "Dumpling Hill / Dumplin Hill"
Samuel Hopkins House	Samuel Hopkins House	Miller Place	c. 1770	
Fulton County Courthouse		Johnstown	1772	Oldest courthouse in the United States that remains in use
Van Cortlandt Upper Manor House	Uppermanorhouse-300	Cortlandt Manor	1773	Potentially built before 1773. Significantly remodeled 1830.
Kingsland Homestead		Flushing, Queens	1774	
William Floyd House	WilliamFloydEstate	Mastic Beach	1774	Only surviving home in New York to be once owned by a signer of the Declaration of Independence
Lefferts Homestead		Prospect Park, Brooklyn	1777	Moved to Prospect Park from its original location at 563 Flatbush Avenue
Baylis Homestead	116_Carnation]	Floral Park	1779	Oldest House in Floral Park
Fort Golgotha	Fort Golgotha and Old Burial Hill; NRHP Plaque	Huntington	1782	Revolutionary-era fort and cemetery, one of the few remaining in the area.
Dyckman House		Inwood, Manhattan	1784	Only remaining original farmhouse in Manhattan
Old First Church	Old First Church, Huntington NY	Huntington	1784	Church grounds existed since 1665. Present church replaced a 1782 church that was destroyed.
Edward Mooney House		Lower Manhattan	1785	Oldest surviving row house in Manhattan
Ellis Squires Jr. House		Hampton Bays	1785	Oldest surviving row house in Hampton Bays
James Benjamin Homestead	James Benjamin Homestead; Flanders, New York-3	Flanders	1785	One of the oldest homes in Flanders.
Jericho Friends Meeting House	Jericho Friends Meetinghouse-5	Jericho	1788	Quaker meeting house
Commack Methodist Church and Cemetery	Comac Church	Commack	1789	Oldest Methodist church with continuous use in New York State
Smith Estate (Ridge, New York)	Longwood Smith Estate	Ridge	1790	Built atop the former Manor St. George property
George Underhill House		Locust Valley	1790	Also known as "Wayside"
Homan-Gerard House and Mills	Homan-Gerard House & Mills - John Homan House	Yaphank	c. 1790	
Stone-Tolan House		Brighton	c. 1792	A Federal-style structure said to be the oldest surviving building in Monroe County
Friends' Schoolhouse		Jericho	1793	Part of Friends Meetinghouse Complex
Van Wyck-Lefferts Tide Mill	PHOTOCOPY OF EXTERIOR, LOOKING NORTHWEST. COURTESY OF HISTORIC HUNTINGTON, 1903. - Lefferts Tide Mill, Huntington Harbor, Southdown Road, Huntington, Suffolk County, NY HAER NY,52-LOHA,2-18	Lloyd Harbor	1793	Boat tours occasionally given on the grounds.
James Watson House	James Watson House	Manhattan	1793	Extended in 1806.
House at 251 Rocklyn Avenue	House at 251 Rocklyn Avenue, Lynbrook-3	Lynbrook	c. 1793	West section of the home is original.
Gardiners Island Windmill	Gardiner-island	Gardiners Island	May 23, 1795	Restored after collapsing partially in 1815
Bridge Cafe		Lower Manhattan	1795	Oldest wooden building in Manhattan
Denton Homestead	Denton Homestead, East Rockaway-1	East Rockaway	1795	Originally built as a tavern and converted into residential farmhouse
Denton House	Denton House McDonald's, Jericho Turnpike and Nassau Terminal Road, New Hyde Park, New York.	New Hyde Park	1795	Presently a McDonald's.
St. Mark's Church in-the-Bowery	St Mark's Church - New York City	East Village	1795	Construction completed in 1799.
Montauk Point Light	Montauk Light House - panoramio (1)	Montauk	1796	Significantly modified since initial construction. Now museum. Farthest east point on the south fork of Long Island.
Flatbush Dutch Reformed Church		Flatbush	1796	
Blackwell House		Roosevelt Island	1796	40°45′37″N 73°57′4″W
First Reformed Church in Albany	First Reformed Church, Albany	Albany	1797-1799	Congregation started in 1642.
Edgar Allen Poe Cottage		The Bronx	1797	Sources differ on if it was constructed in 1797 or 1812.
David Tuthill Farmstead	David-tuthill	Cutchogue	1798	Farm complex still a private residence
Mount Vernon Hotel Museum		Upper East Side, Manhattan	1799	Listed on the National Register of Historic Places.
Jesse Tuthill House	Jesse-and-ira-tuthill	Mattituck	1799	Overall building constructed in two parts, the first in 1799 and the second in 1841.
Gracie Mansion		Upper East Side, Manhattan	1799	Mayor's Residence
Van Nuyse-Magaw House		Midwood	1800	1041 East 22nd Street 40°37′36.5″N 73°57′15.5″W
Hamilton Grange	Hamilton Grange at St. Nicholas Park in October 2009	Hamilton Heights	1802	Home of Alexander Hamilton. Relocated twice (1889 and 2008).
Wadsworth Homestead		Geneseo	1804	Built in 1804 by James Wadsworth who came to Geneseo in 1790. Originally a two-story foursquare home. Enlarged in 1815
Swart-Wilcox House		Oneonta	1807	Listed on the National Register of Historic Places. Built in 1807. Now operated as the Swart-Wilcox House Museum..
Gideon Tucker House		Tribeca, Manhattan	1809	2 White Street. Small Federal style row house
Cantonment Farm			1812	This private residence is the last standing officers' barracks built in 1812.
Putnam County Court House		Carmel	1814	Second oldest courthouse in the United States that remains in use
Clarkson Community Church		Clarkson	1825	This Protestant church, perhaps the oldest in western Monroe County, was established in 1816 and has operated continuously since that date. The original 1825 Colonial structure, with a 100' steeple, has had two subsequent additions (in 1967 and in 1985).
Hull Family Home and Farmstead		Lancaster	c. 1820	Lived in until 1990s, but is now a preserved home and is able to be visited. The Hulls moved into the property c. 1800, but built the house in 1820. The house is the oldest stone house in Erie County.
Willets Point Farmhouse		Bayside, now Fort Totten, Queens	1829	Built by Charles and Martha Willet and eventually moved to Fort Totten. The fort itself was built in 1857, and an Officer's Club was built in 1870 which is now home to the Bayside Historical Society.
LaTourette House		Staten Island	1836	1836 brick Federal-style building now used as clubhouse for city-owned golf course.
Anshe Slonim Synagogue		Lower Manhattan	1849	Oldest surviving synagogue building in New York City
203 East 29th Street		Kips Bay, Manhattan	1790/1870	Privately owned house dates back to 1790 or 1870, based on different sources. Listed in National Register of Historic Places
