= Matinecock Friends Meetinghouse =

Historic church in New York, United States

- U.S. National Register of Historic Places
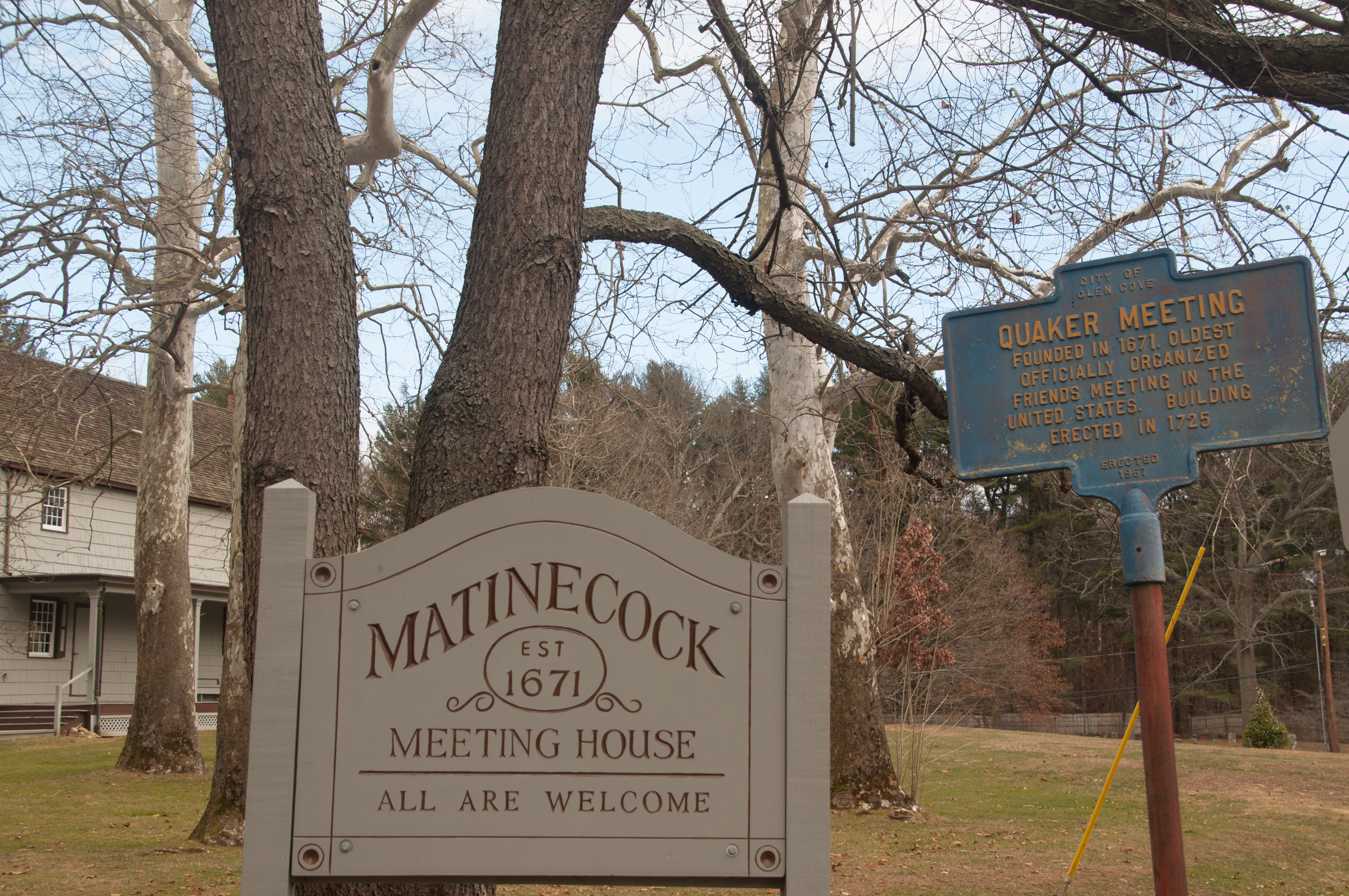
- The Matinecock Meeting House in 2010

- Location within New York Location within the United States
- Location: Piping Rock and Duck Pond Rds., Locust Valley, New York
- Coordinates: 40°51′59″N 73°35′41″W
- Area: 2 acres (0.81 ha)
- Built: 1725
- NRHP reference No.: 76001231
- Added to NRHP: July 19, 1976

Matinecock Friends Meetinghouse is a historic Quaker meeting house located on the northwest corner of Piping Rock and Duck Pond Roads within the Incorporated Village of Matinecock, in Nassau County, New York, United States.

== Description ==
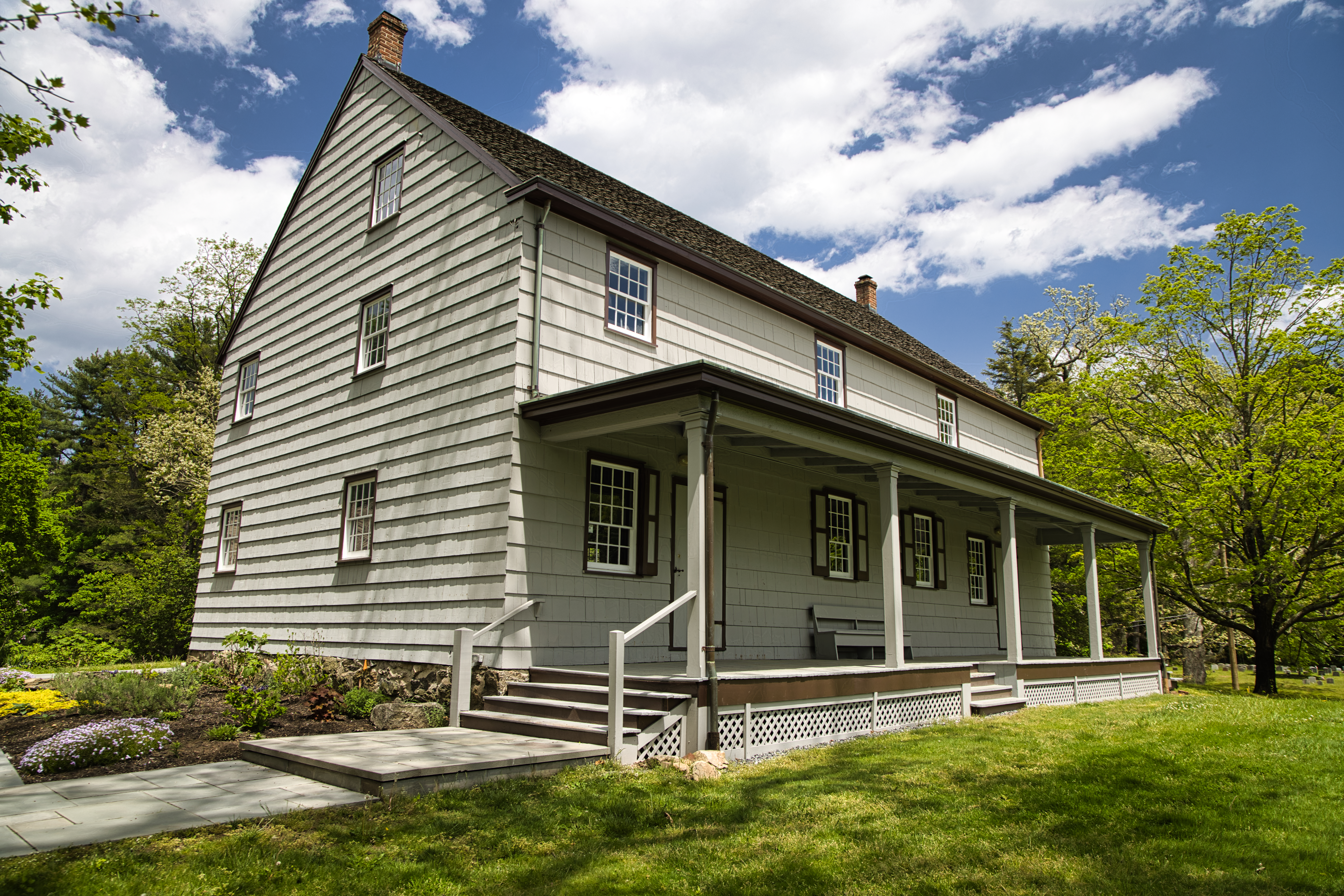
The Meetinghouse in May 2022

The Matinecock Friends Meetinghouse was built in 1725. It is a two-story, rectangular building, topped by a steeply pitched gable roof. The structure is two bays wide and four bays long, sheathed in shingles.

It was listed on the National Register of Historic Places in 1976.

== See also ==
- Manhasset Monthly Meeting of the Society of Friends
- Jericho Friends Meeting House Complex
