= Manhasset Monthly Meeting of the Society of Friends =

- U.S. National Register of Historic Places
- New York State Register of Historic Places
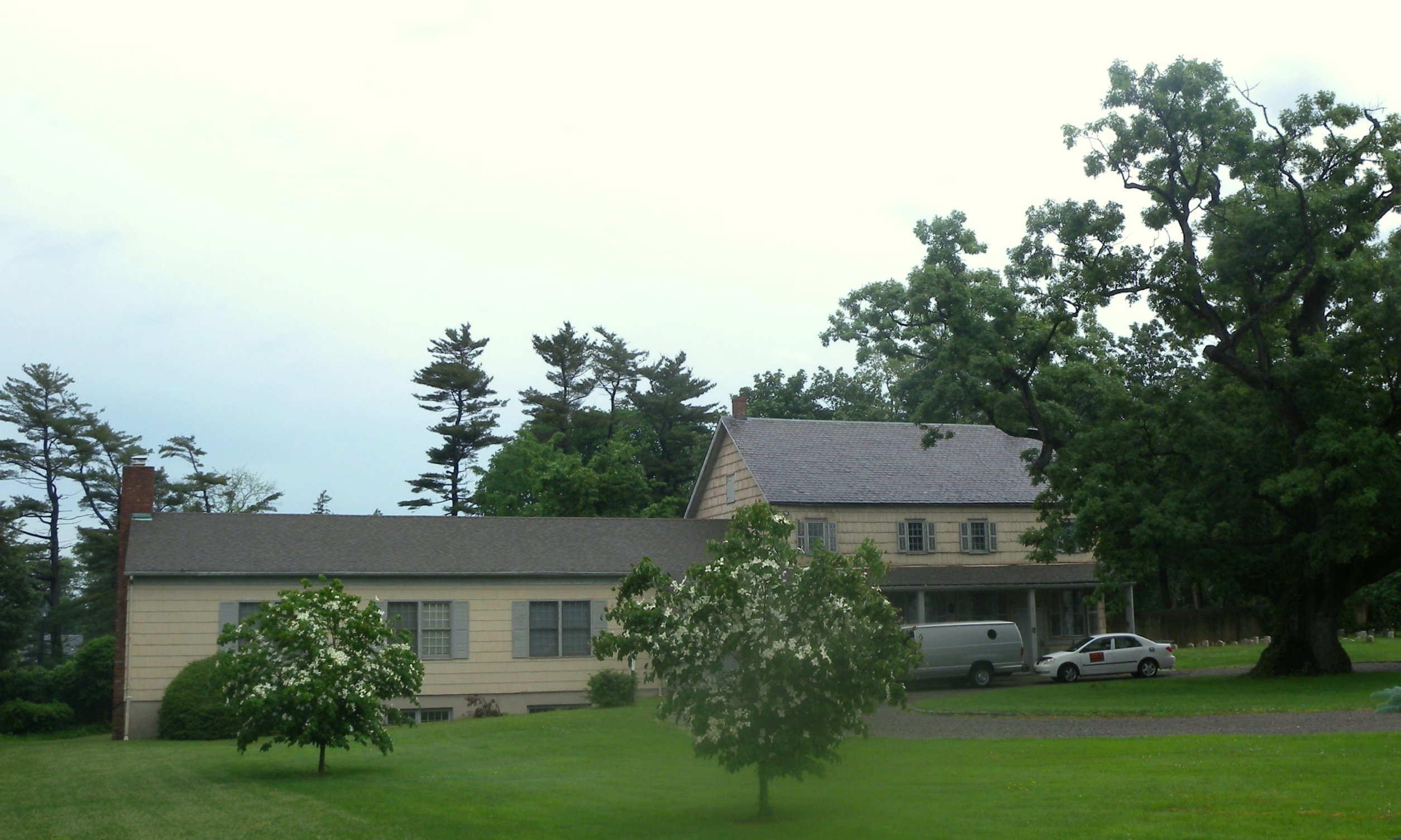
- The Manhasset Monthly Meeting of the Society of Friends, as seen in 2011

- Location within New York Location within the United States
- Location: 1421 Northern Boulevard, Manhasset, New York
- Coordinates: 40°47′37″N 73°41′40″W
- Built: 1812
- Website: manhassetquakers.org
- NRHP reference No.: 09000700

Significant dates
- Added to NRHP: September 9, 2009
- Designated NYSRHP: July 28, 2009

Manhasset Monthly Meeting of the Society of Friends is a landmarked Quaker friends meeting house located in Manhasset in Nassau County, New York, United States.

== Description ==
The building at the Manhasset Monthly Meeting of the Society of Friends has a long, rectangular layout. A cemetery is also located on the property, as well as a large lawn. A stone fence surrounds the property.

The property is located at 1421 Northern Boulevard, on the north side of that road's intersection with Shelter Rock Road.

It was added to the National Register of Historic Places on September 9, 2009. Prior to that, on July 28, 2009, it was listed on the New York State Register of Historic Places.

== See also ==
- Jericho Friends Meeting House Complex
- National Register of Historic Places listings in North Hempstead (town), New York
