= Stone–Tolan House =

Historic house in New York, United States

- U.S. National Register of Historic Places
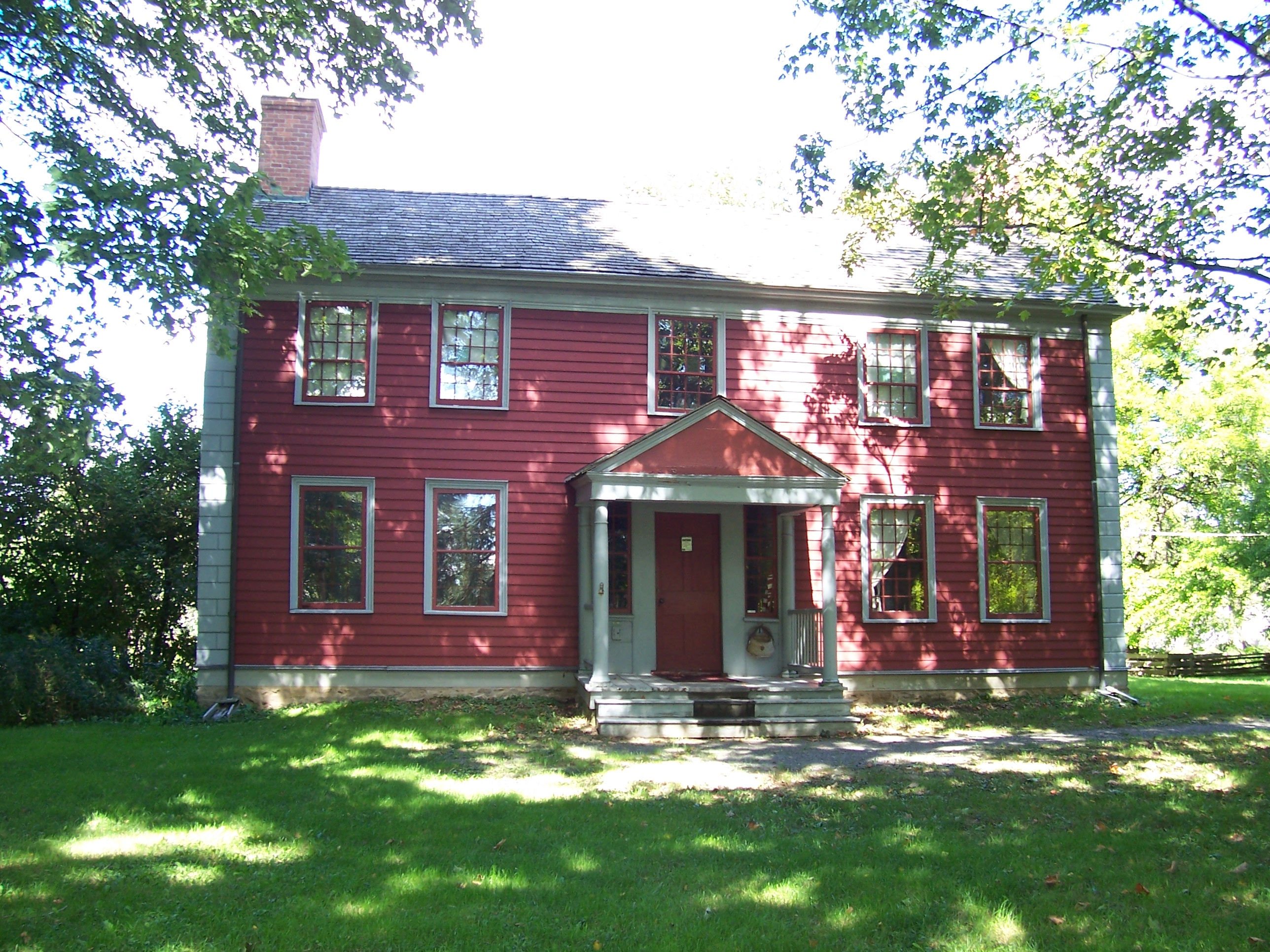
- Stone–Tolan House, September 2012

- Location within New York Location within the United States
- Location: 2370 East Avenue, Brighton, New York
- Coordinates: 43°8′23″N 77°32′32″W
- Area: 4 acres (1.6 ha)
- Built: 1792
- Architectural style: Federal
- NRHP reference No.: 83001710
- Added to NRHP: July 21, 1983

Stone–Tolan House is a historic home located at Brighton in Monroe County, New York. The 2-story frame house has a 1-story frame wing that is believed to have been built in 1792. It is a vernacular Federal-style structure and served as a frontier tavern, public meeting place, and pioneer homestead. The Landmark Society of Western New York acquired the property in 1956 to restore and preserve as a museum.

It was listed on the National Register of Historic Places in 1983.

== See also ==
- List of the oldest buildings in the United States
- List of the oldest buildings in New York
