= Suydam House =

Historic house in New York, United States

- U.S. National Register of Historic Places
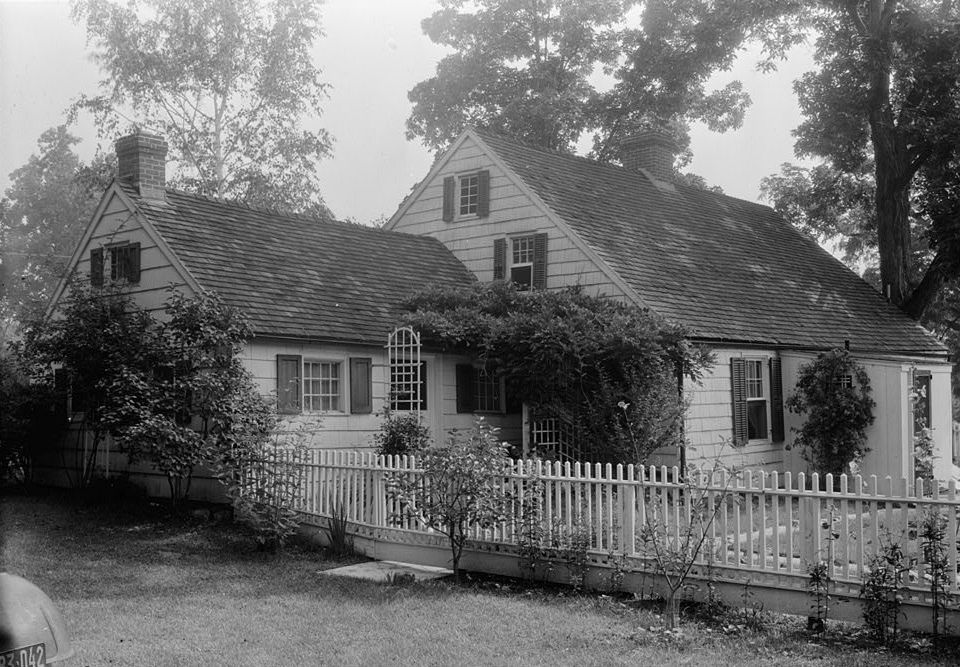
- Historic American Buildings Survey photograph of Suydam House

- Location within New York Location within the United States
- Location: 1 Ft. Salonga Rd., Centerport, New York
- Coordinates: 40°53′9″N 73°22′1″W
- Area: 1 acre (0.40 ha)
- Built: 1730
- Architectural style: Saltbox
- MPS: Huntington Town MRA
- NRHP reference No.: 88002135
- Added to NRHP: October 27, 1988

Suydam House (also known as Suydam Homestead) is a historic home in Centerport in Suffolk County, New York. It was built about 1730 and is a rectangular, five-bay, 1 1/2-story saltbox type building with a one-story wing. It features a steeply pitched, asymmetrical gable roof, pierced by a brick chimney.

The house is on Suffolk County Parkland on the southeast corner of Suffolk County Road 86 and New York State Route 25A, across from the southern terminus of Little Neck Road. It was added to the National Register of Historic Places in 1988.

The Greenlawn-Centerport Historical Association has restored the house and operates it as a historic house museum. Of particular note are the unusual windows, both six panes over three, and four panes over two.

Its NRHP nomination from 1988 asserts:

The Suydam house is architecturally and historically significant as a distinguished, largely extant example of settlement period domestic architecture on Long Island that recalls the early growth of the town of Huntington. Built circa 1730, this New England style saltbox (with eighteenth century wing) is one of the oldest remaining houses in the village of Centerport. It is similar in plan, construction and design to many settlement period dwellings in Huntington (Town) such as the John Wood House (circa 1704) and the Ireland-Gardiner Farm (circa 1750). Like these and other seventeenth and eighteenth century dwellings in the Huntington (Town) Multiple Resource area, the building exhibits characteristic architectural features of early construction practices on Long Island, including heavy hewn timber framing, original wrought-iron hardware, and an overall lack of decorative ornamentation.
