= Lent Homestead and Cemetery =

Historic house and cemetery in Queens, New York

- Riker–Lent–Smith Homestead and Cemetery
- U.S. National Register of Historic Places
- New York City Landmark
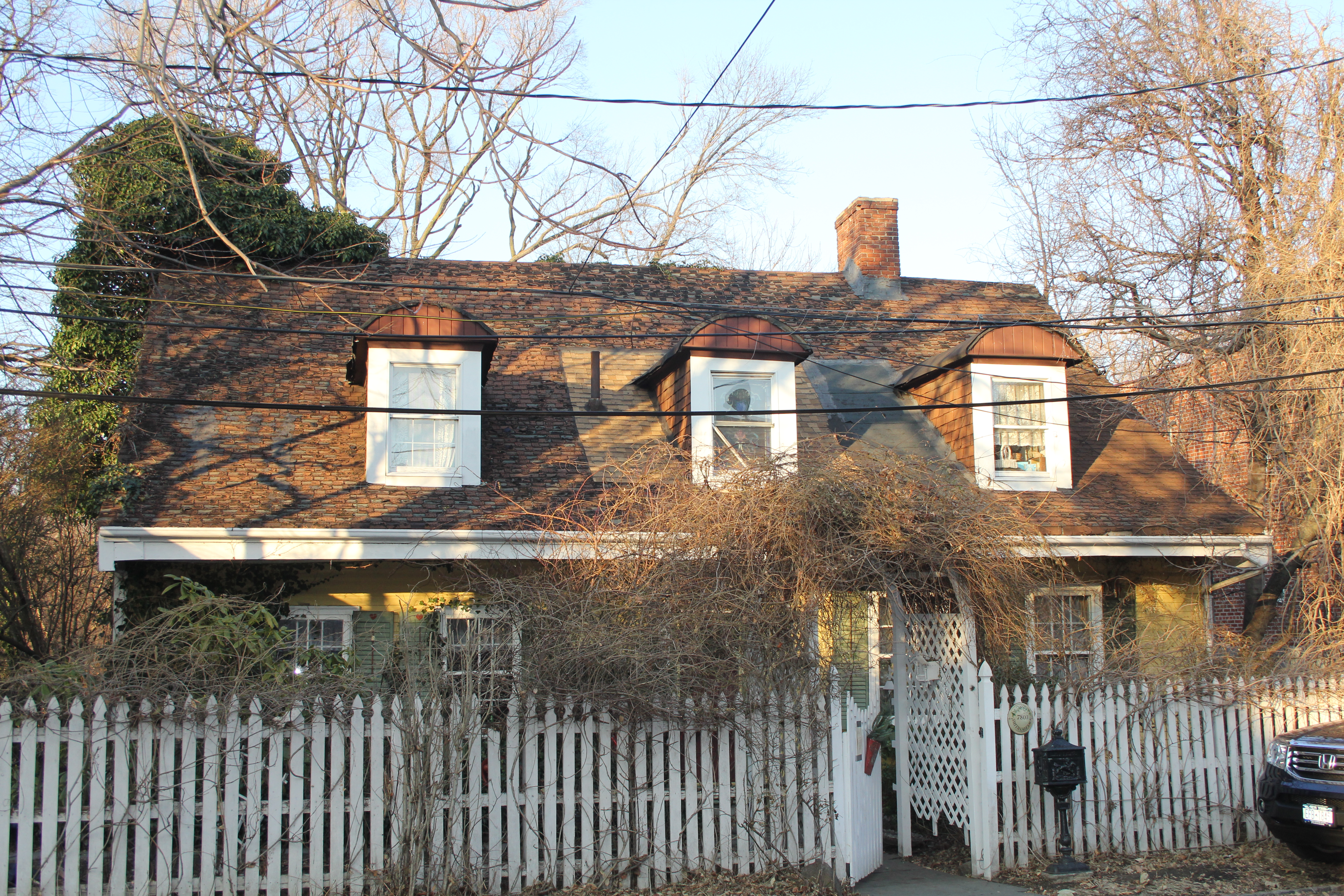
- House as seen from 19th Road
- Location: 78-03 19th Rd., East Elmhurst, New York
- Coordinates: 40°46′23″N 73°53′31″W
- Area: 1 acre (0.40 ha)
- Built: 1656, 1729 additions
- Architectural style: Colonial, Dutch Colonial
- NRHP reference No.: 84002918
- NYCL No.: 0135

Significant dates
- Added to NRHP: February 2, 1984
- Designated NYCL: March 15, 1966

The Riker–Lent–Smith Homestead and Cemetery are a historic house and cemetery in the Steinway and East Elmhurst neighborhoods of Queens in New York City.

The earliest part of the house was built by Abraham Riker in 1656. He was an early settler of New Amsterdam, and a member of the Riker family, for whom Rikers Island nearby is named; the house was owned by the Riker and Lent families for much of its history. In 1729, the house was expanded and additions were built by then-owner Abraham Lent, a descendant of Abraham Riker. The small graveyard contains not only the graves of family members, but also that of Irish revolutionary and physician William James MacNeven who died in 1841 and who had stayed with the Riker family. Around 1800 the house was again expanded to its current size. It remains an intact house in the Dutch Colonial style. Current owner Marion Duckworth Smith and her late husband Michael Smith began restoration work in 1980, and the house was added to the National Register of Historic Places in 1984.

The house is the oldest known existing residential structure in Queens.

== See also ==
- List of New York City Designated Landmarks in Queens
- List of the oldest buildings in New York
- List of the oldest buildings in the United States
- National Register of Historic Places listings in Queens, New York
