= Matinecock, New York =

Matinecock, New York Matinnicoke ("The Hill Country")
- Village
- Incorporated Village of Matinecock
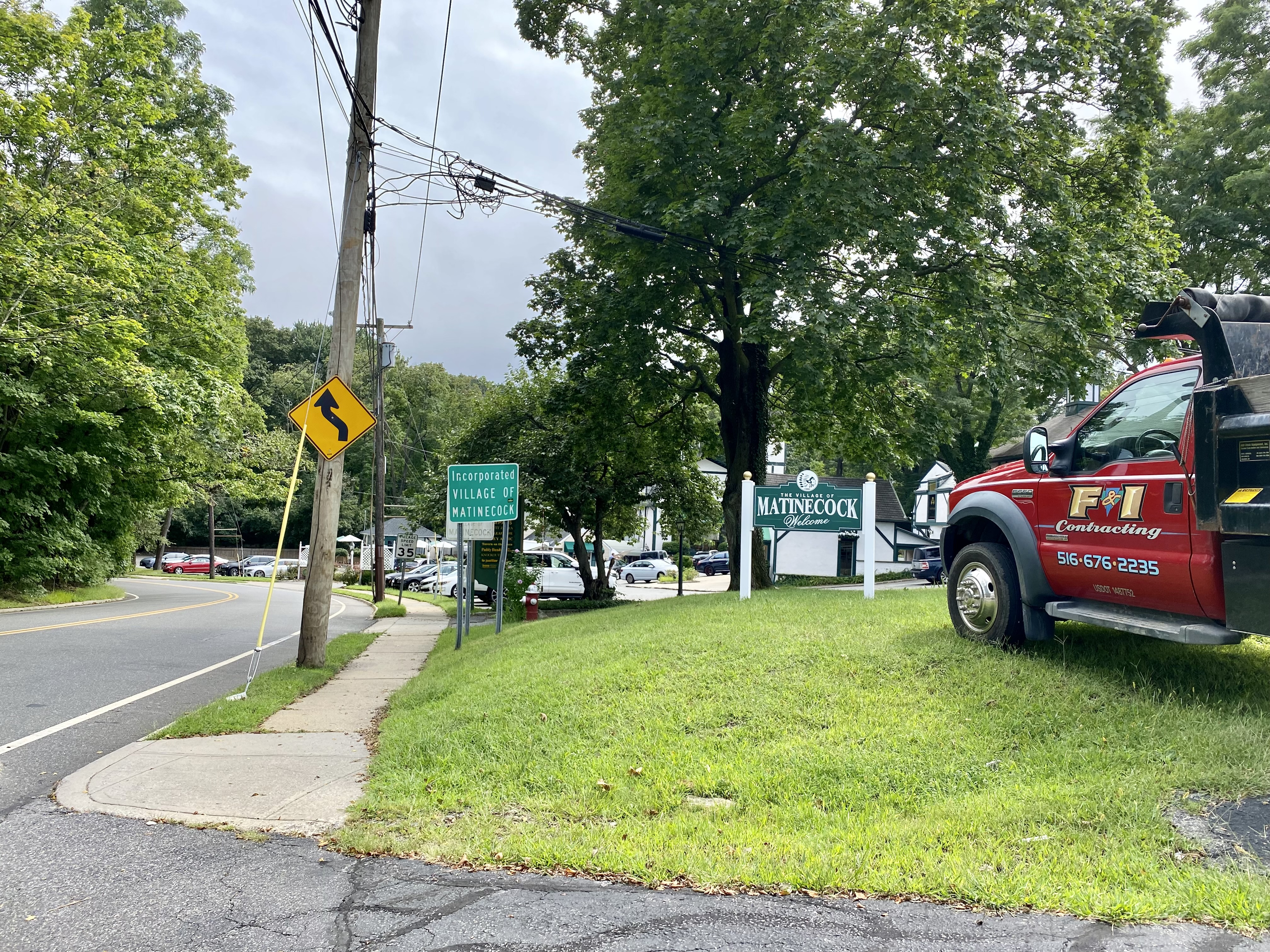
- A welcome sign to Matinecock in 2021

- Location in Nassau County and the state of New York

- Location on Long Island Location within the state of New York
- Coordinates: 40°52′20″N 73°35′4″W
- Country: United States
- State: New York
- County: Nassau
- Town: Oyster Bay
- Incorporated: April 2, 1928
- Named for: The Matinecock People

Government
  - Mayor: Kenneth J. Goodman, M.D.

Area
  - Total: 2.67 sq mi (6.92 km^{2})
  - Land: 2.67 sq mi (6.91 km^{2})
  - Water: 0.0039 sq mi (0.01 km^{2})
- Elevation: 89 ft (27 m)

Population (2020)
  - Total: 847
  - Density: 317.5/sq mi (122.59/km^{2})
- Time zone: UTC-5 (Eastern (EST))
  - Summer (DST): UTC-4 (EDT)
- ZIP Codes: 11560 (Locust Valley); 11771 (Oyster Bay)
- Area codes: 516, 363
- FIPS code: 36-46107
- GNIS feature ID: 0956671
- Website: www.matinecockvillage.org

Matinecock is a village located within the Town of Oyster Bay in Nassau County, on the North Shore of Long Island, in New York, United States. The population was 847 at the time of the 2020 census.

== History ==
Matinecock incorporated as a village on April 2, 1928, in order to gain municipal home rule powers and be able to better manage local governmental affairs.

The village is named for the Indigenous Matinecock people, who inhabited much of the area. "Matinecock" roughly translates to "the Hill Country," and was the Matinecock name for the modern-day village as well as for much of the surrounding area.

In May 1998, Worth Magazine ranked Matinecock as the fifth richest town in America and the richest town in New York.

== Geography ==
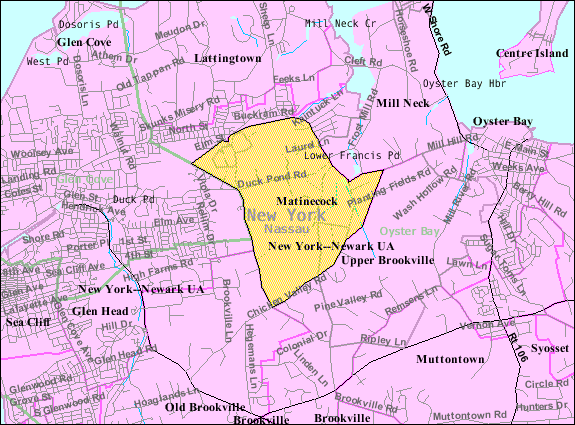
U.S. Census map of Matinecock

According to the United States Census Bureau, the village has a total area of 2.7 square miles (7.0 km^{2}), all land.

The village is bordered to the west by the City of Glen Cove.

== Demographics ==
Historical population
Census	Pop.	Note	%±
1930	484		—
1940	428		−11.6%
1950	507		18.5%
1960	824		62.5%
1970	841		2.1%
1980	985		17.1%
1990	872		−11.5%
2000	836		−4.1%
2010	810		−3.1%
2020	847		4.6%
U.S. Decennial Census

=== Racial and ethnic composition ===
Matinecock village, New York – Racial and ethnic composition Note: the US Census treats Hispanic/Latino as an ethnic category. This table excludes Latinos from the racial categories and assigns them to a separate category. Hispanics/Latinos may be of any race.
Race / Ethnicity (NH = Non-Hispanic)	Pop 2000	Pop 2010	Pop 2020	% 2000	% 2010	% 2020
White alone (NH)	775	727	710	92.70%	89.75%	83.83%
Black or African American alone (NH)	8	14	1	0.96%	1.73%	0.12%
Native American or Alaska Native alone (NH)	0	0	0	0.00%	0.00%	0.00%
Asian alone (NH)	13	16	46	1.56%	1.98%	5.43%
Native Hawaiian or Pacific Islander alone (NH)	0	0	0	0.00%	0.00%	0.00%
Other race alone (NH)	0	0	0	0.00%	0.00%	0.00%
Mixed race or Multiracial (NH)	8	3	13	0.96%	0.37%	1.53%
Hispanic or Latino (any race)	32	50	77	3.83%	6.17%	9.09%
Total	836	810	847	100.00%	100.00%	100.00%

=== 2000 census ===
At the 2000 census there were 836 people, 285 households, and 216 families in the village. The population density was 315.6 inhabitants per square mile (121.9/km^{2}). There were 313 housing units at an average density of 118.1 per square mile (45.6/km^{2}). The racial makeup of the village was 96.05% White, 1.08% African American, 1.56% Asian, and 1.32% from two or more races. Hispanic or Latino of any race were 3.83%.

Of the 285 households 36.8% had children under the age of 18 living with them, 67.7% were married couples living together, 3.9% had a female householder with no husband present, and 24.2% were non-families. 20.7% of households were one person and 10.2% were one person aged 65 or older. The average household size was 2.93 and the average family size was 3.31.

The age distribution was 26.8% under the age of 18, 4.5% from 18 to 24, 26.1% from 25 to 44, 27.3% from 45 to 64, and 15.3% 65 or older. The median age was 40 years. For every 100 females, there were 95.8 males. For every 100 females age 18 and over, there were 98.1 males.

The median household income was $135,922 and the median family income was $171,832. Males had a median income of $100,000 versus $36,042 for females. The per capita income for the village was $93,559. About 2.1% of families and 4.1% of the population were below the poverty line, including 3.3% of those under age 18 and 4.3% of those age 65 or over.

== Government ==
As of November 2025, the Mayor of Matinecock is Kenneth J. Goodman, M.D., the Deputy Mayor is Albert Kalimian, and the Village Trustees are Linda G. Berke, Linda Gardiner, William I. Hollingsworth, III, Carol E. Large, and Robert Marmorale.

=== Politics ===
In the 2024 U.S. presidential election, the majority of Matinecock's voters voted for Donald Trump (R).

== Education ==
=== Schools ===
==== Public ====
The Village of Matinecock is located entirely within the boundaries of the Locust Valley Central School District. As such, all children who reside within Matinecock and attend public schools go to Locust Valley's schools.

==== Private ====
The private Portledge School is located within Matinecock.

=== Library district ===
Matinecock is located within the boundaries of the Locust Valley Library District.

== See also ==
- List of municipalities in New York
- Matinecock Friends Meetinghouse
