= Town Doctors' House and Site =

- U.S. National Register of Historic Places
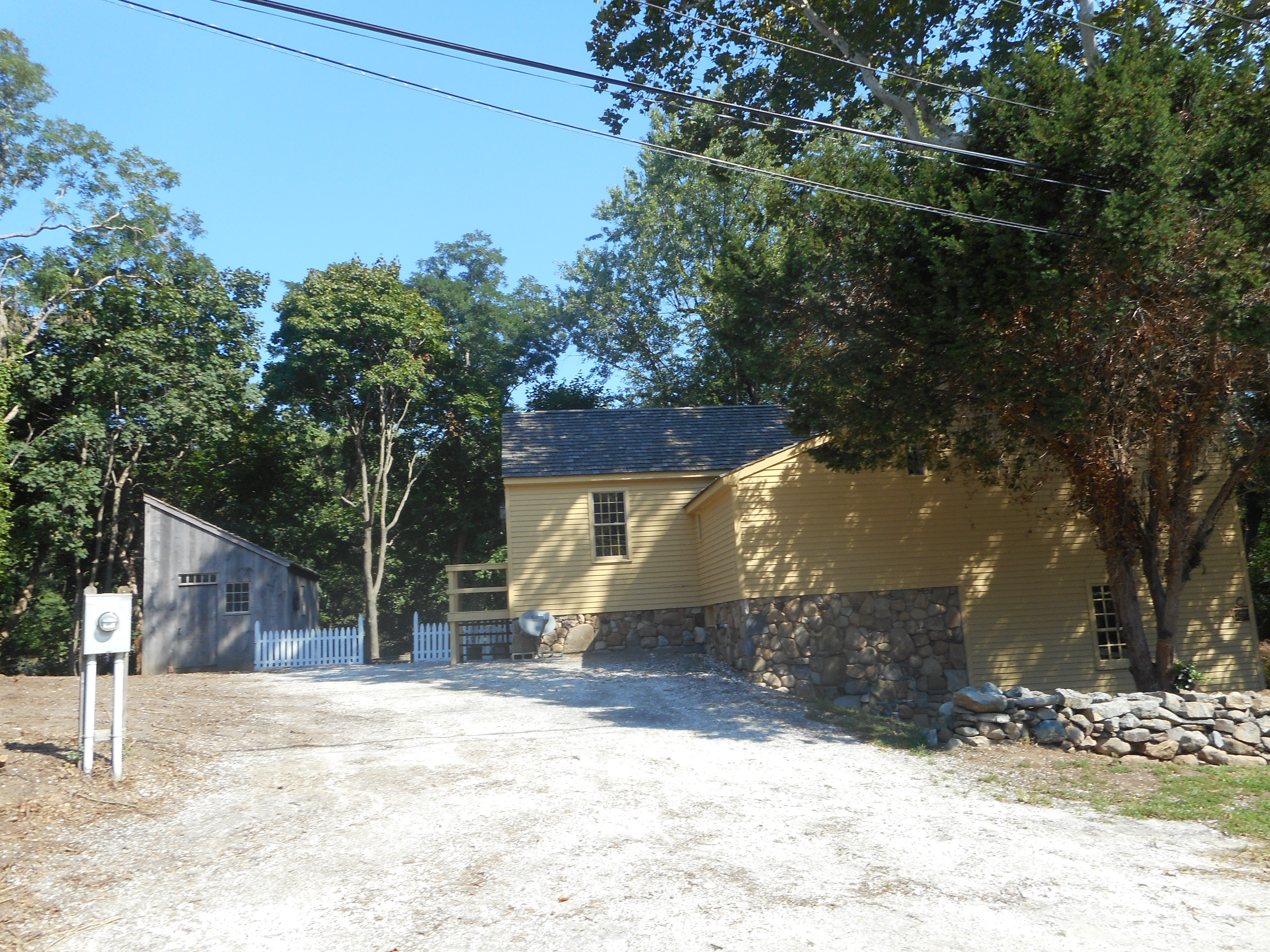
- The historic Southold Town Doctor's House, currently a private residence.

- Location within New York Location within the United States
- Location: 310 Ackerly Pond Ln., Southold, New York
- Coordinates: 41°3′25″N 72°26′12″W
- Area: less than one acre
- Architectural style: Colonial
- NRHP reference No.: 04001448
- Added to NRHP: January 5, 2005

Town Doctors' House and Site is a historic home located at Southold in Suffolk County, New York. The house was built about 1720, and expanded in about 1880, 1930, and 2002–2003. The house is a 2 1/2-story, northern-Colonial–style building with a cross-gabled roof and central chimney. The site includes Bilberry Swamp, where the earliest Euro-American occupation occurred around 1664. There is evidence on the site of pre-17th-century occupation by Native Americans.

It was added to the National Register of Historic Places in 2005.
