= David Tuthill Farmstead =

Historic house in New York, United States

- U.S. National Register of Historic Places
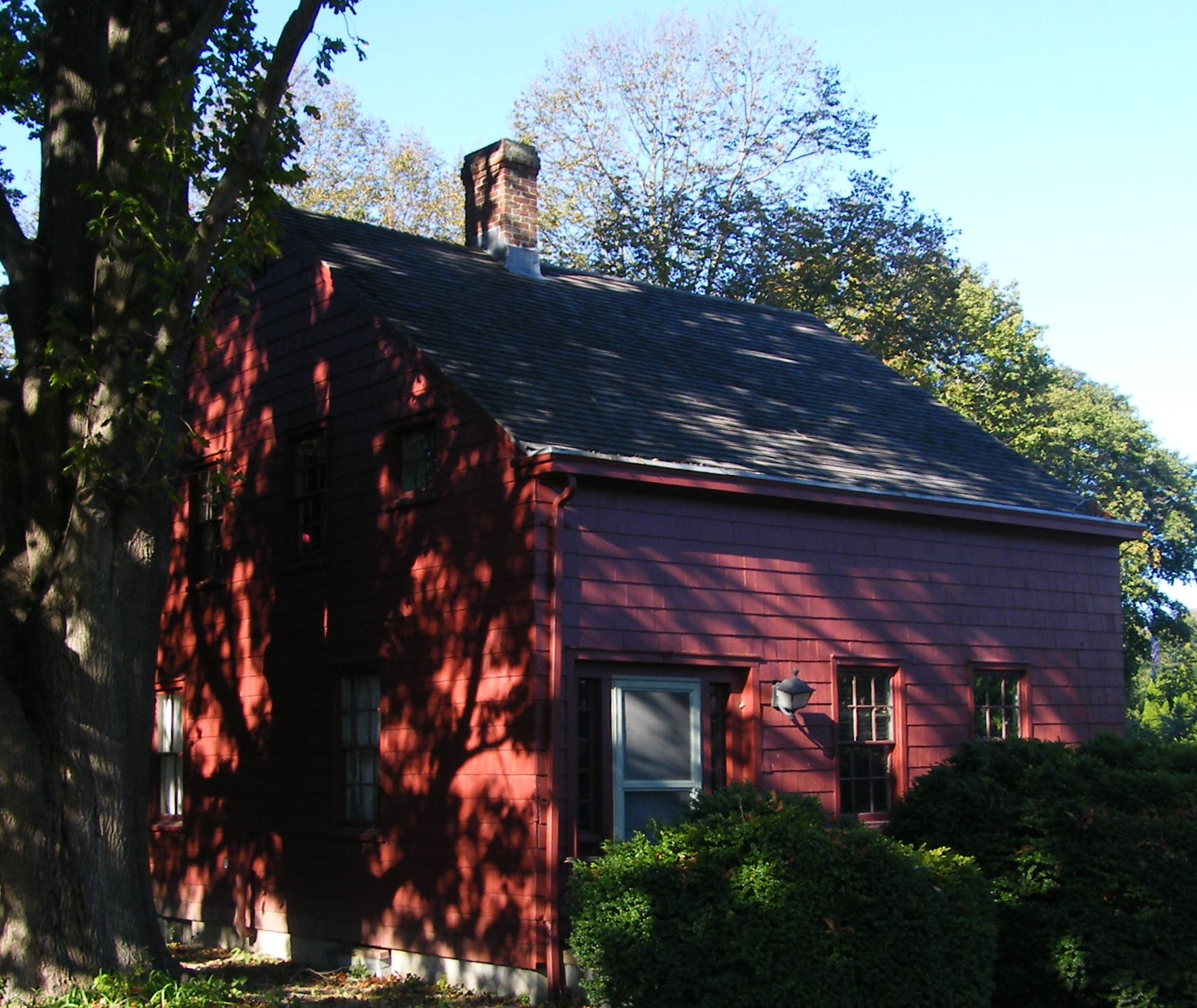
- David Tuthill Residence, October 2008

- Location within New York Location within the United States
- Location: New Suffolk Lane, Cutchogue, New York
- Coordinates: 41°0′25″N 72°29′39″W
- Area: 0.8 acres (0.32 ha)
- Built: 1798
- NRHP reference No.: 84000295
- Added to NRHP: November 23, 1984

David Tuthill Farmstead is a historic farm complex located at Cutchogue in Suffolk County, New York. It includes the main house, a one-story wash house, a privy, a one-story shop, a one-story garage, and a large barn with attached water tower. The original one story 1798 farmhouse has a five bay, center entrance, center chimney plan. Attached to the original farmhouse is a two-story wing built about 1880.

It was added to the National Register of Historic Places in 1984.
