= Nathaniel Longbotham House =

Historic house in New York, United States

- U.S. National Register of Historic Places
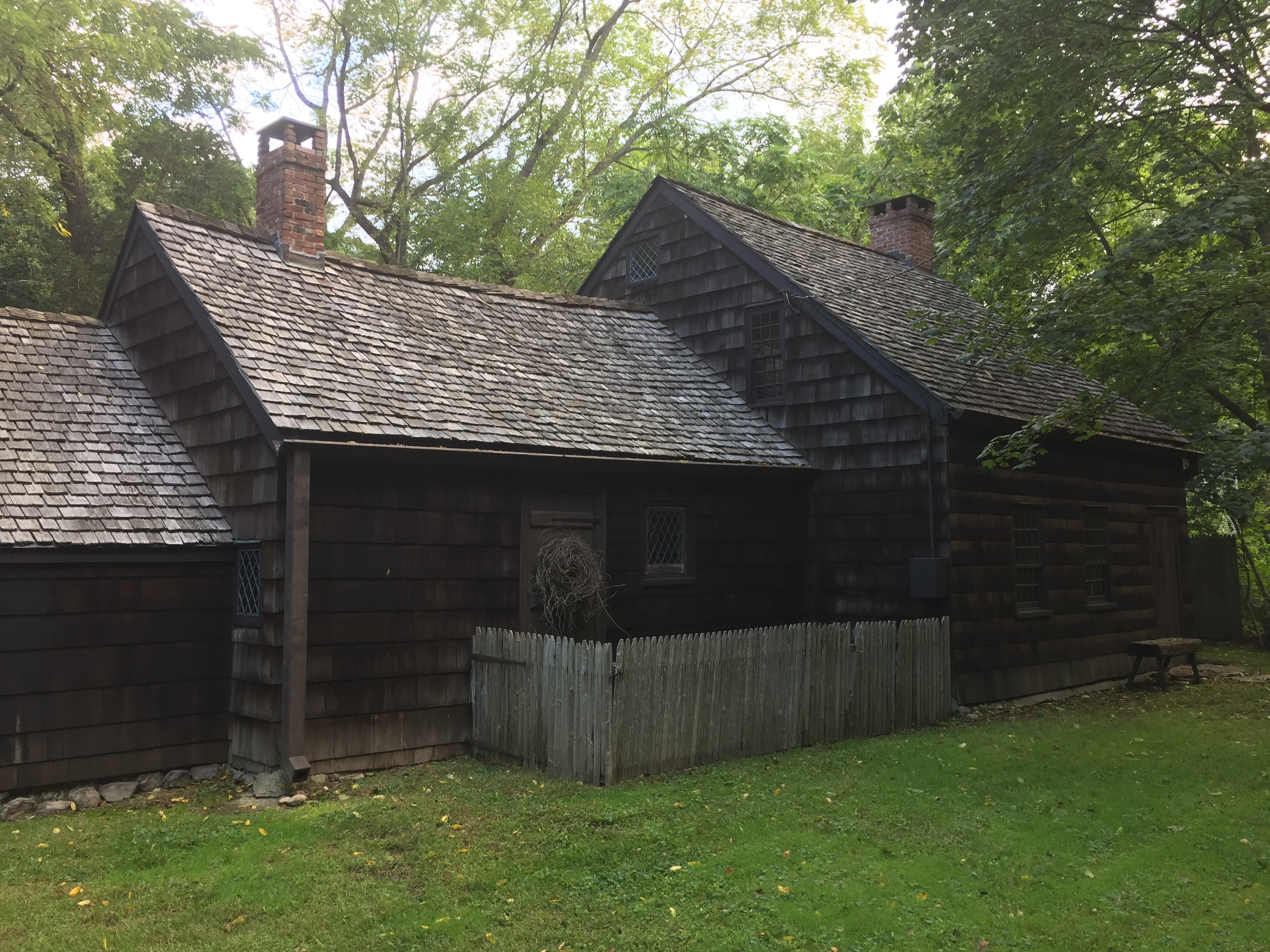
- View of the house from northwest-bound Stony Brook Road.

- Location within New York Location within the United States
- Location: 1541 Stony Brook Rd., Stony Brook, New York
- Coordinates: 40°54′27″N 73°8′5″W
- Area: 0.1 acres (0.040 ha)
- Architectural style: Colonial
- NRHP reference No.: 89002022
- Added to NRHP: November 16, 1989

Nathaniel Longbotham House is a historic home located at 1541 Stony Brook Road, in Stony Brook in Brookhaven Town, Suffolk County, New York. It is composed of three visually and physically distinct sections that are joined gable to gable and diminish in height from east to west. The earliest and smaller section was built before 1690. It is a post, beam, and stud wall framed 1 1/2-story half-house, 20 feet long and 26 feet deep. Also on the property is an early-19th-century shed and late-17th- or early-18th-century well.

It was added to the National Register of Historic Places in 1989.
