= Thomas Strong House =

Historic house in New York, United States

- U.S. National Register of Historic Places
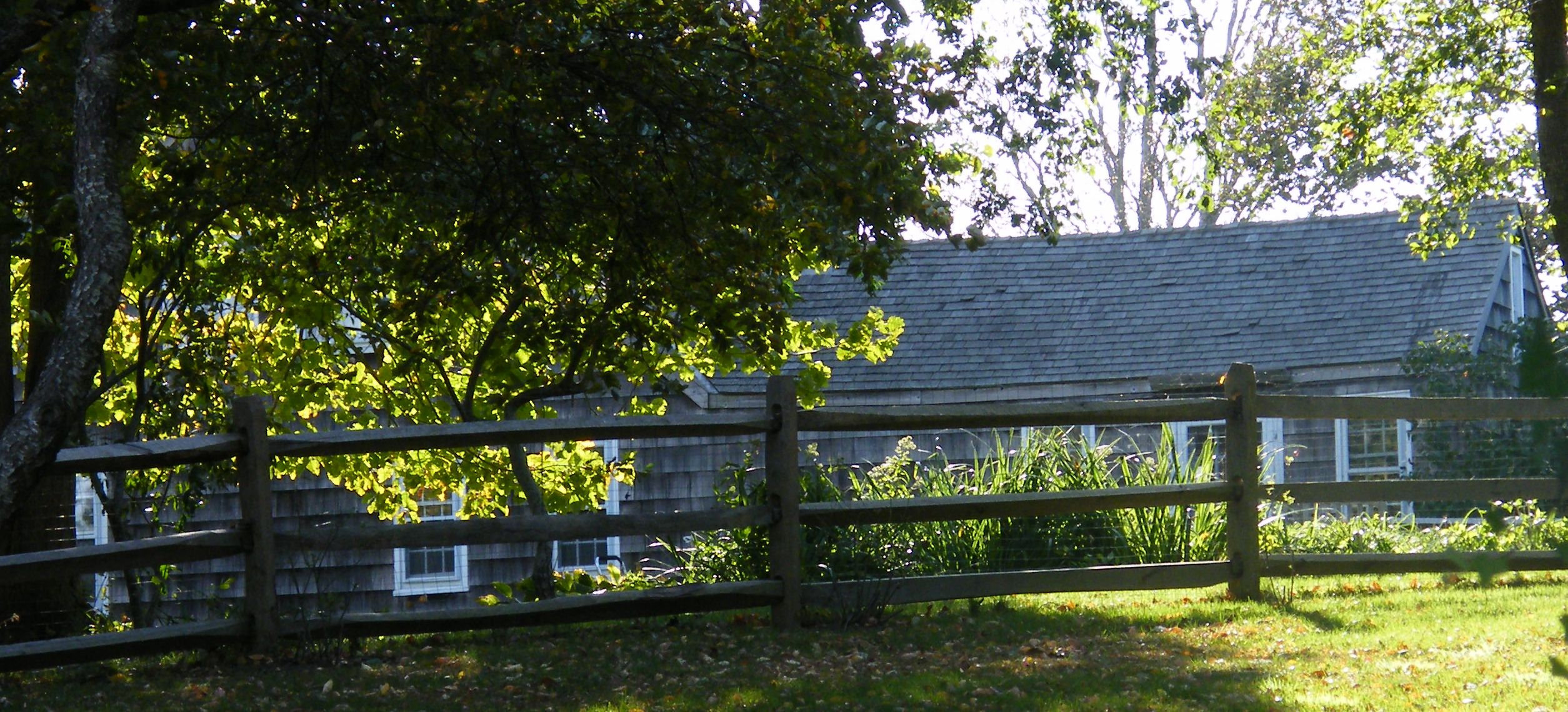
- Thomas Strong House, October 2008

- Location within New York Location within the United States
- Location: 100 Wainscott Hollow Rd., Wainscott, New York
- Coordinates: 40°56′12″N 72°15′8″W
- Area: 4.9 acres (2.0 ha)
- Built: 1883
- Architect: Strong, Thomas
- Architectural style: Colonial
- NRHP reference No.: 04001451
- Added to NRHP: January 5, 2005

Thomas Strong House is a historic home located at Wainscott in Suffolk County, New York. It is a 1 1/2-story, L-shaped, gable-roofed, cedar shingle clad structure originally built about 1695 and continually lived in by eight generations of Thomas Strong's descendants.

It was added to the National Register of Historic Places in 2005.
