= B. Ketchum House =

Historic house in New York, United States

- U.S. National Register of Historic Places
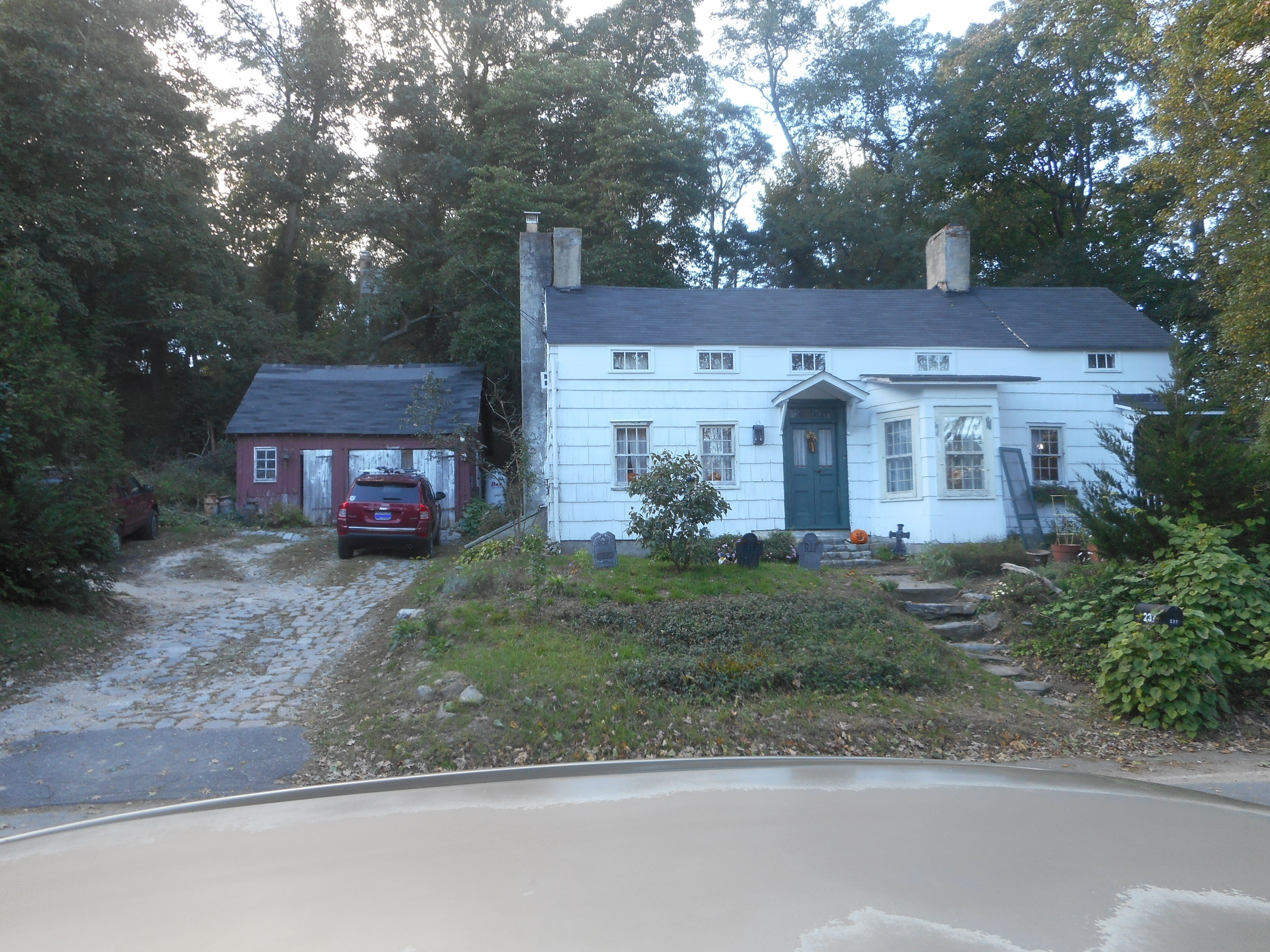
- The B. Ketchum House in October 2018.

- Location within New York Location within the United States
- Location: 237 Middleville Road, Fort Salonga, New York
- Coordinates: 40°53′57″N 73°17′51″W
- Area: 0.5 acres (0.20 ha)
- Built: c. 1765
- MPS: Huntington Town MRA
- NRHP reference No.: 85002581
- Added to NRHP: September 26, 1985

B. Ketchum House is a historic home located in Fort Salonga in the Town of Huntington in Suffolk County, New York. It is a 1 1/2-story, six-bay shingled dwelling. The main entrance features a four-pane transom, simple molded surround, and gable-roof canopy. It was built about 1765 on what is today the northwest corner of Middleville Road and Bread-and-Cheese Hollow Road, and representative of the early settlement of Huntington.

It was added to the National Register of Historic Places in 1985.
