= Isaac Losee House =

Historic house in New York, United States

- U.S. National Register of Historic Places
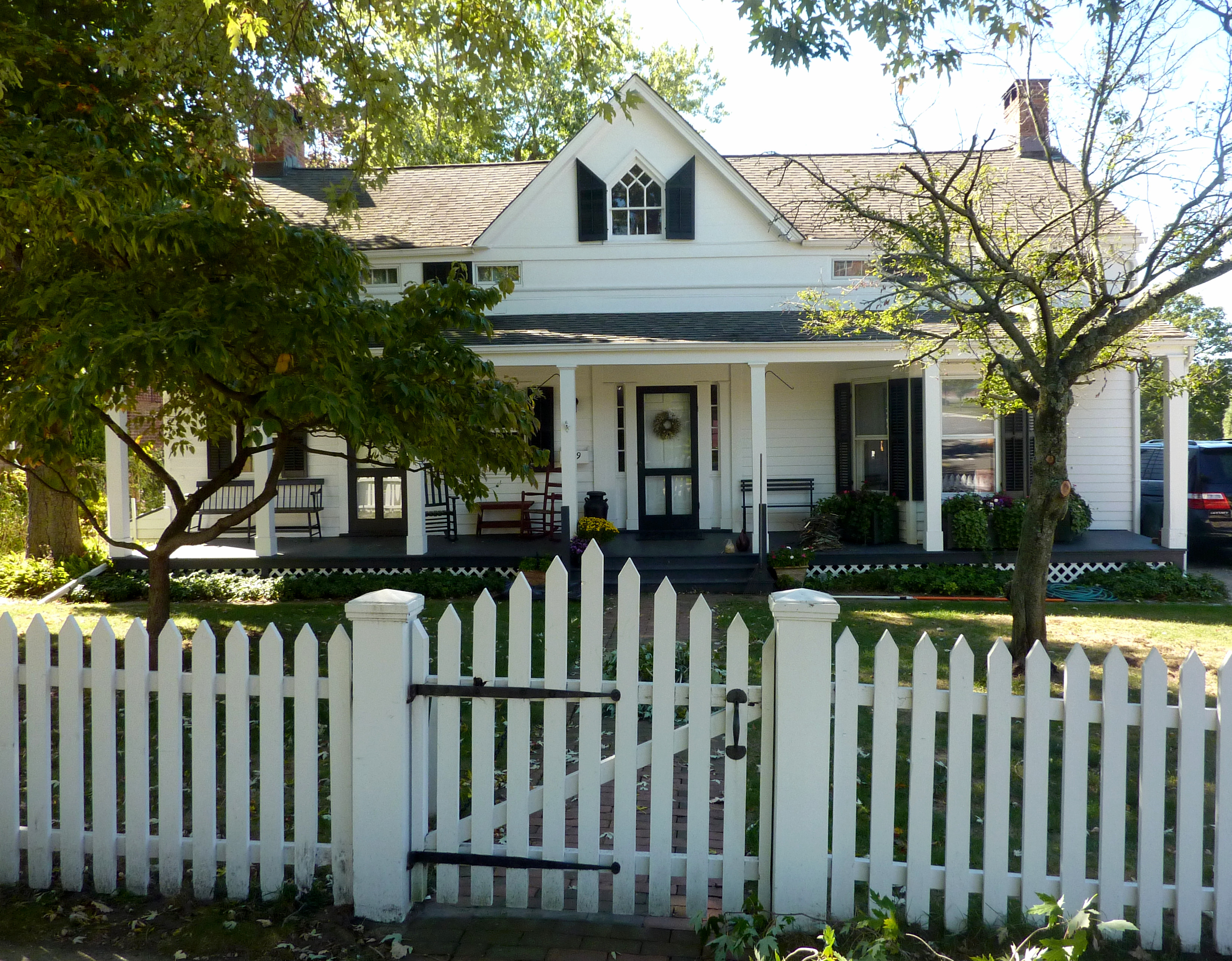

- Location within New York Location within the United States
- Location: 269 Park Ave., Huntington, New York
- Coordinates: 40°52′44″N 73°25′7″W
- Area: less than one acre
- Built: 1750
- MPS: Huntington Town MRA
- NRHP reference No.: 85002582
- Added to NRHP: September 26, 1985

Isaac Losee House is a historic home located at Huntington in Suffolk County, New York. It is a 1 1/2-story, five-bay, clapboard dwelling with a gable roof. The main entrance features a shed roof porch with square columns. It was built about 1750 and representative of the early settlement of Huntington.

It was added to the National Register of Historic Places in 1985.
