= Ezra Carll Homestead =

Historic house in New York, United States

- U.S. National Register of Historic Places
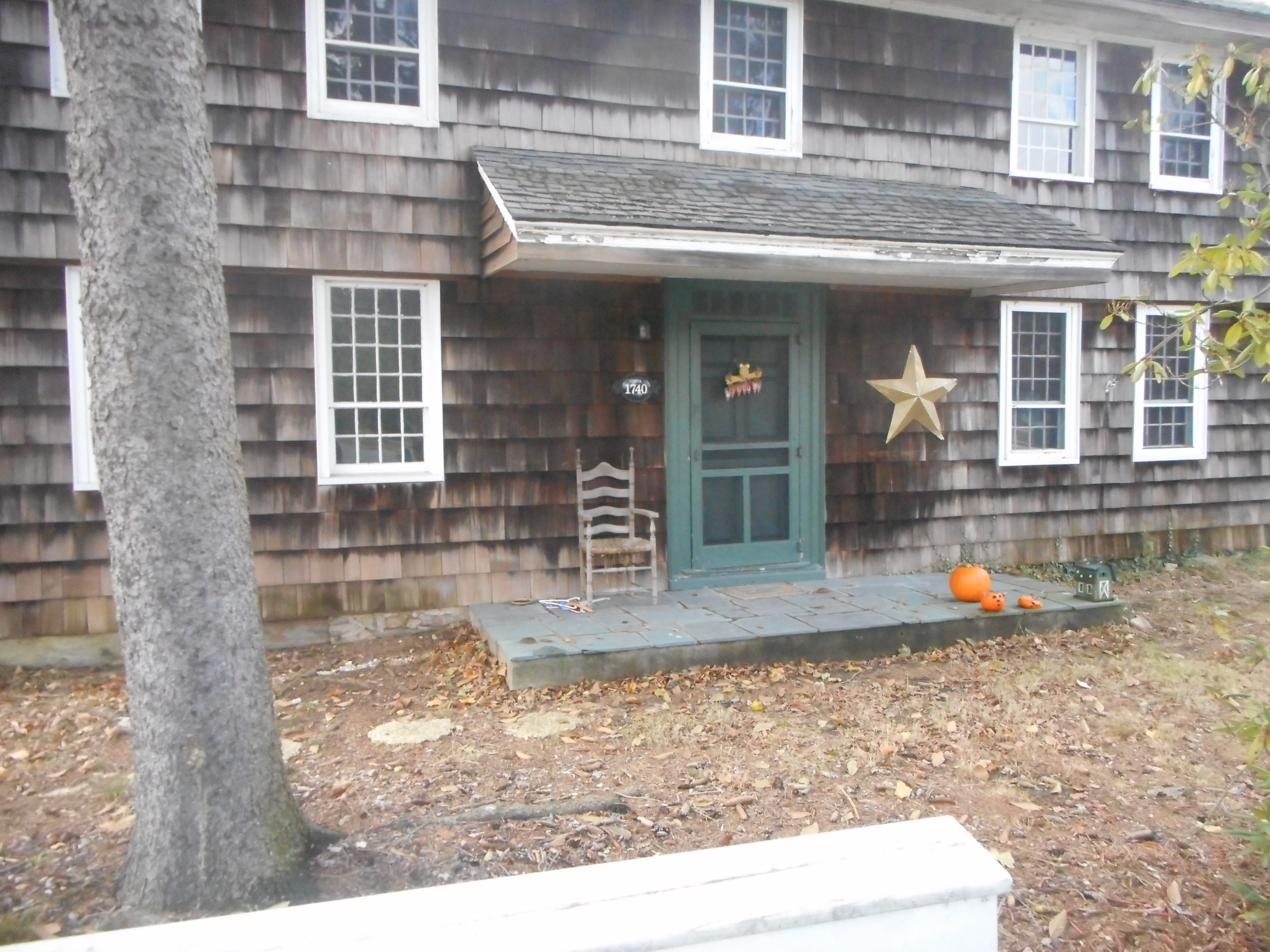
- Mid-November 2017 image of the Carll House in South Huntington.

- Location within New York Location within the United States
- Location: 49 Melville Rd., Huntington Station, New York
- Coordinates: 40°49′40″N 73°23′48″W
- Area: 0.3 acres (0.12 ha)
- Built: ca. 1700
- Architectural style: Colonial, New England Colonial
- MPS: Huntington Town MRA
- NRHP reference No.: 85002506
- Added to NRHP: September 26, 1985

Ezra Carll Homestead is a historic home located in South Huntington, New York, in Suffolk County, New York. It is located on the northwest corner of Melville Road and Eckert Street and was built about 1700 and is a 2-story, gable-roofed, wood-shingle dwelling with a lean-to profile and second-story overhang. The oldest part of the structure is the 1 1/2-story, gable-roofed south wing. It has a rubblestone foundation and massive central chimney.

It was added to the National Register of Historic Places in 1985.
