= Joseph Buffett House =

Historic house in New York, United States

- U.S. National Register of Historic Places
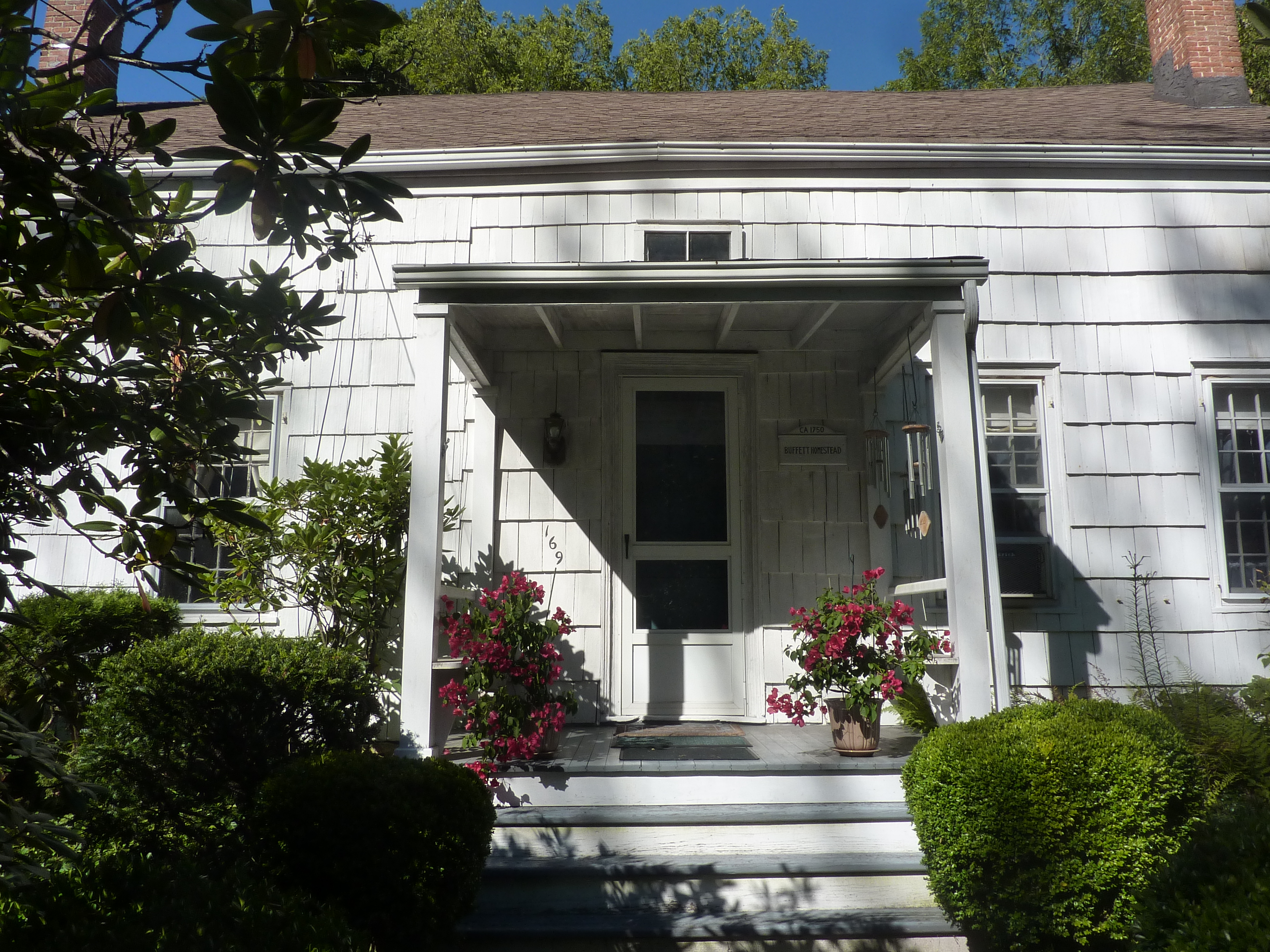

- Location within New York Location within the United States
- Location: 169 W. Rogues Path, Cold Spring Harbor, New York
- Coordinates: 40°50′16″N 73°26′43″W
- Area: 1 acre (0.40 ha)
- Built: 1750
- Architect: Buffett, Joseph; Multiple
- MPS: Huntington Town MRA
- NRHP reference No.: 85002497
- Added to NRHP: September 26, 1985

The Joseph Buffett House is a historic house located at 169 West Rogues Path in Cold Spring Harbor, Suffolk County, New York.

== Description and history ==
It consists of a 1 1/2-story, five-bay wide, shingle-sided dwelling built in about 1830, with a 1 1/2-story, three-bay wide, saltbox shingle-sided wing built in about 1750. It is one of the oldest intact residences in Cold Spring Harbor village.

It was added to the National Register of Historic Places on September 26, 1985.
