= Wilson House (Oyster Bay, New York) =

House on the Oyster Bay History Walk tour

Coordinates: 40°52′20.29″N 73°31′42.47″W

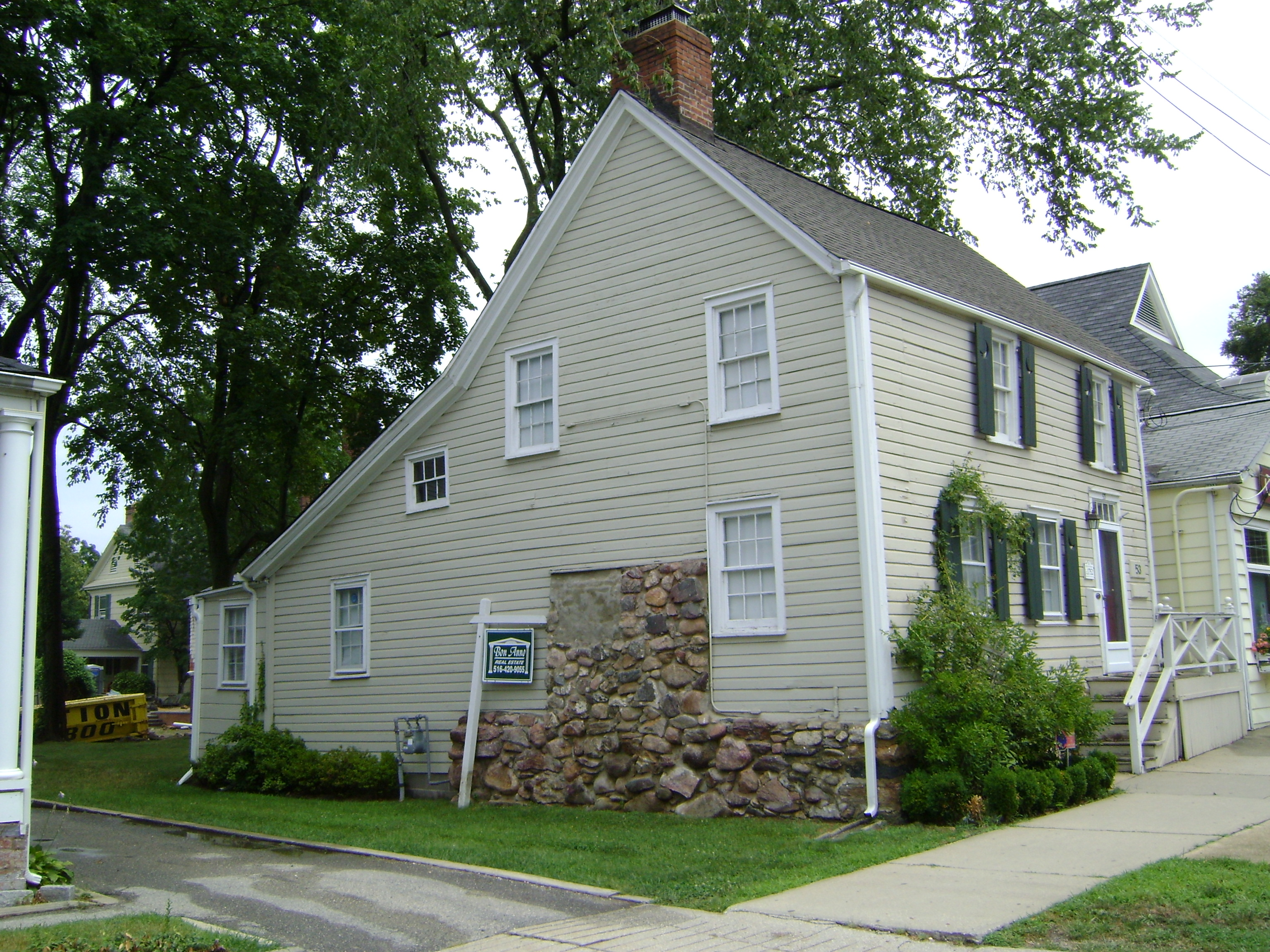
Photo of Wilson House, 2008

Wilson House is one of the oldest houses in Oyster Bay, New York, still standing on its original site. The house dates back to the 1750s, and is an example of saltbox architecture. This refers to houses, often south-facing, with sloping rear sections ending at a height of three or four feet. Two legends persist about famous visitors to the house. Marquis de Talleyrand is reputed to have spent a night in the 1790s while fleeing the ‘Reign of Terror’ in France. President George Washington is reputed to have stopped there and spoken to children from the porch on April 24, 1790. These legends bring added interest to an already special old home, one of the last of its kind. Today the house is a featured site on the Oyster Bay History Walk audio walking tour.

== History ==
This small house, called the Wilson House, is one of the oldest in Oyster Bay still standing on its original site. It is named for Harry Wilson, who lived here for over sixty years in the mid 19th century. Mr. Wilson was a cooper, or barrel maker, and also a vestryman at nearby Christ Church. Although named for Wilson the house dates way back to the 1750s. It appears to be an example of classic saltbox architecture, a form which refers to south-facing houses with sloping rear sections ending at a height of three or four feet. These houses were constructed to take advantage of natural sunlight in the front rooms and would traditionally use the tapering northern room as a kitchen and cooking area.

The Wilson House though making use of this form was not always a saltbox style house. A photograph taken in 1890 shows this sloping rear section as having been added on with different planking and wood coloration. The four window transom above the front entry was a 20th-century addition as were the shutters with the new-moon cut outs. Although the chimney is original, the clapboard exterior present today was once 34" natural shingles.

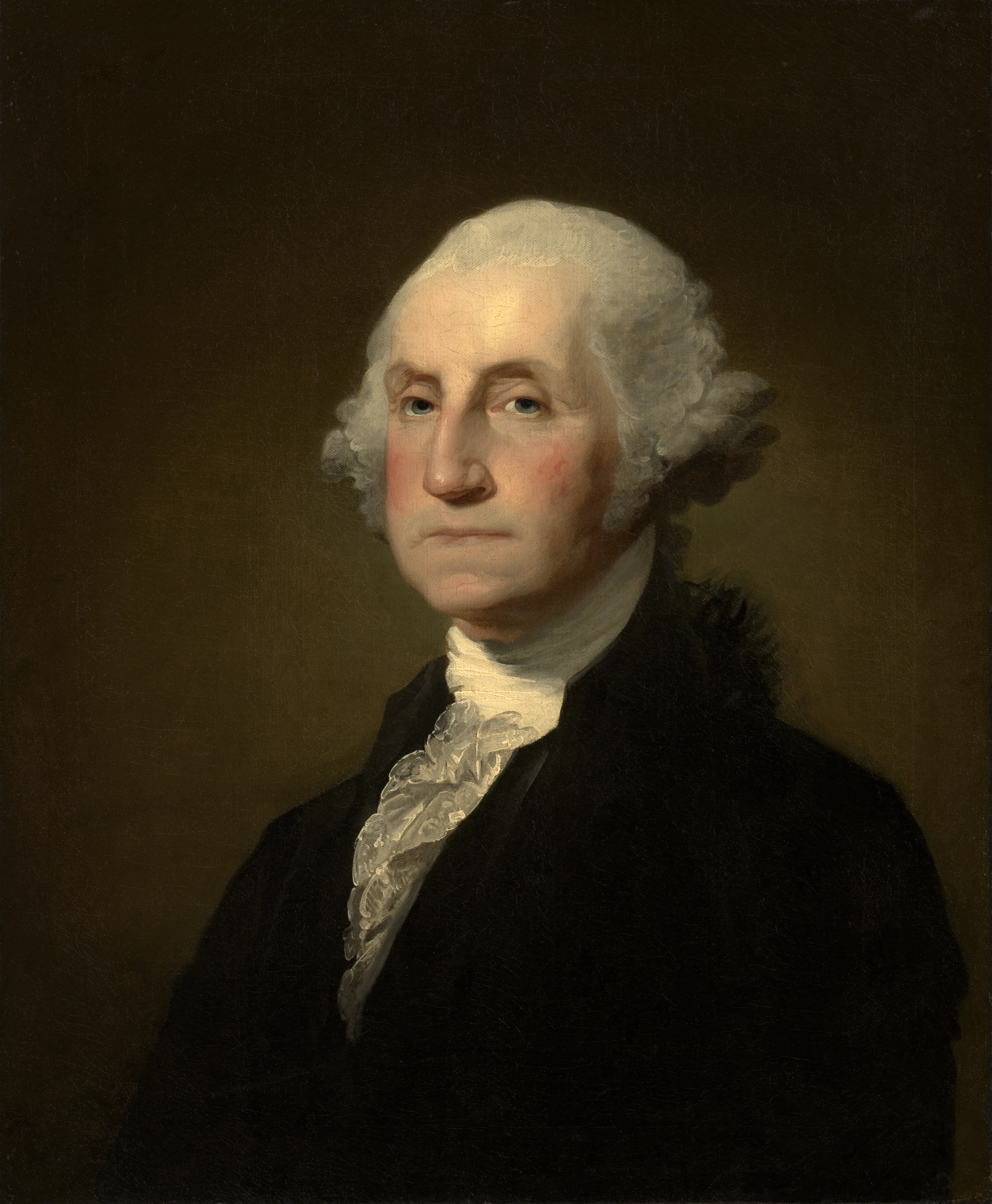
Gilbert Stuart Portrait of George Washington

Two legends are always told about famous visitors to the Wilson House, though neither has ever been proven.

Supposedly in the 1790s while fleeing from the "Reign of Terror" in France, the Marquis de Talleyrand spent the night here. Talleyrand did live on Long Island from 1794 to 1796 before returning to France to become Napoleon's foreign secretary.

The other persisting legend is that President George Washington stopped here and spoke to local children from the porch of the Wilson House on April 24, 1790. We know that Washington had spent the night at the Youngs' House just down the road in Oyster Bay Cove. However, in Washington's diary he records leaving Mr. Youngs' house before 6:00 am, passing Musketa Cove (which is now Glen Cove) and eating breakfast at Mr. Onderdonks, which is now a restaurant in Roslyn. If Washington did stop here to speak to the children of Oyster Bay, the visit must have been very early and very brief.

These legends may have kernels of truth in them and they bring added interest to an already interesting old home, one of the last of its kind on Long Island.

== See also ==
- Oyster Bay History Walk
- List of Town of Oyster Bay Landmarks
- National Register of Historic Places listings in Nassau County, New York
