= Jagger House =

Historic house in New York, United States

- U.S. National Register of Historic Places
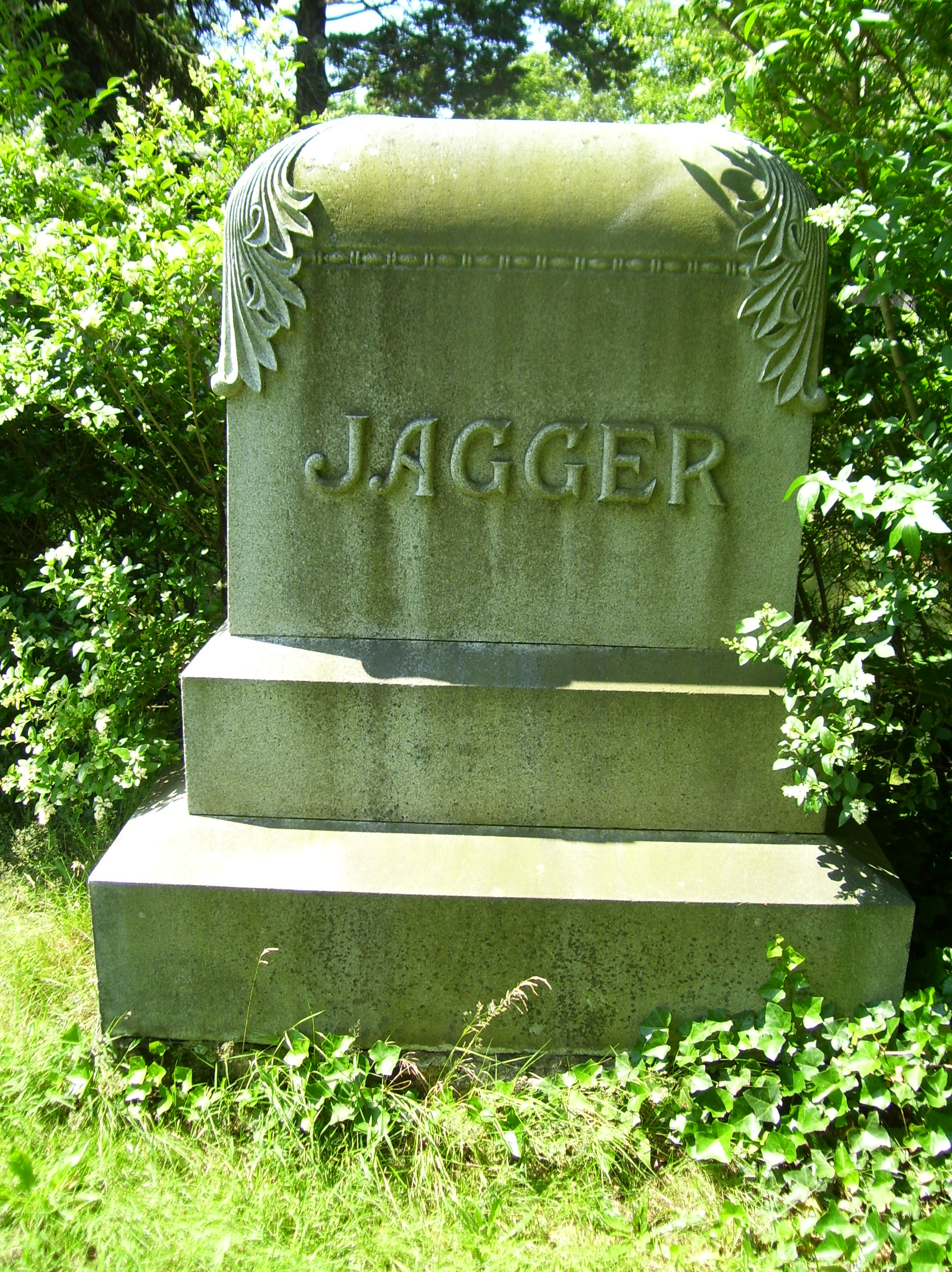
- The grave of Jeremiah Jagger at the Jagger House in Westhampton, New York.

- Location within New York Location within the United States
- Location: Old Montauk Hwy., Westhampton, New York
- Coordinates: 40°49′0″N 72°40′38″W
- Area: 2 acres (0.81 ha)
- Built: ca. 1748
- NRHP reference No.: 78001920
- Added to NRHP: December 12, 1978

Jagger House is a historic home located at Westhampton in Suffolk County, New York. The house has two main components: the original, three-bay, 1 1/2-story section with a gambrel roof built about 1748, and a large 19th-century addition with a gable roof. At the rear are two wooden shed additions.

It was added to the National Register of Historic Places in 1978.
