= Michael Remp House =

Historic house in New York, United States

- U.S. National Register of Historic Places
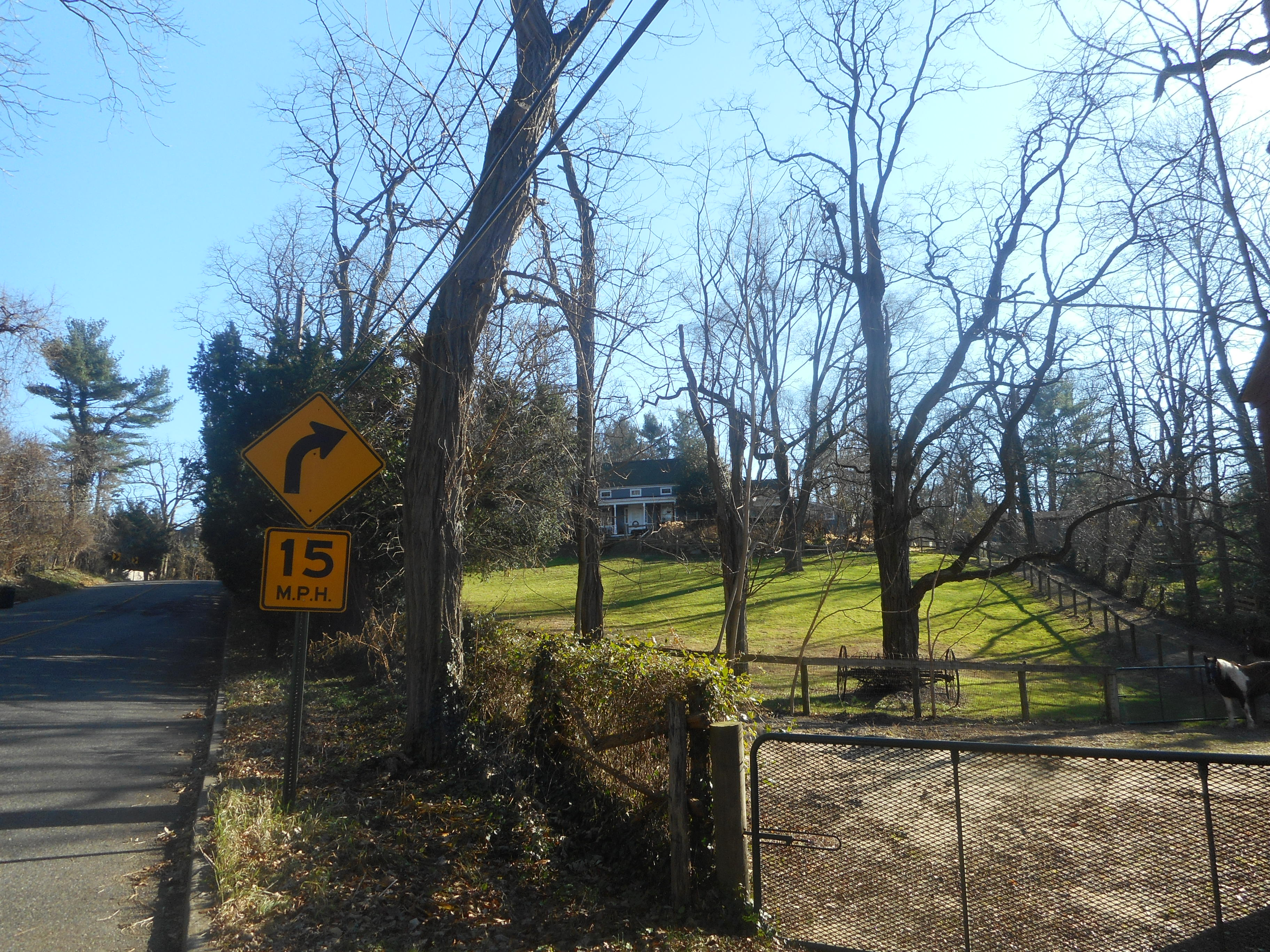
- The Michael Remp House as seen from down Godfrey Lane

- Location within New York Location within the United States
- Location: 42 Godfrey Ln., Greenlawn, New York
- Coordinates: 40°50′49″N 73°21′05″W
- Area: 2.34 acres (0.95 ha)
- Built: c. 1770
- Architect: Michael Remp
- MPS: Huntington Town MRA
- NRHP reference No.: 85002570
- Added to NRHP: September 26, 1985

The Michael Remp House is a historic house located at 42 Godfrey Lane in Greenlawn, Suffolk County, New York. It consists of a 1 1/2-story, five-bay wide, shingled dwelling, flanked by smaller 1 1/2-story, five-bay shingled wings. The earliest section of the house was built in about 1770. Also on the property are three contributing barns.

== History ==
The house was originally part of a large farm that extended westward along the south side of Little Plains Road to Broadway–Greenlawn; it has also been referred to as "Dumpling Hill" or "Dumplin' Hill". The west wing of the house was built by Michael Remp in about 1770 and the main portion of the home and the east wing were added in about 1830. Ownership of Michael Remp's house was passed down to his son Joseph Remp in 1801 and then to his great-grandson Joel Barnum Smith, who occupied the home from 1850 until 1903. Joel had spent much of his time growing up on his uncle's farm and later purchased the property, becoming a prominent farmer in the area. Joel's wife died in 1896, and two years later he married Mary E. Whitson, who lived across the street from him at the Smith Whitson Farm. After he inherited a large amount of property from his uncle, Joel Barnum Smith retired and sold the farm in 1903, moving to Smith Street in the village of Greenlawn.

In 1907, the home and surrounding 28 acres (11 ha) of land were purchased by Martin McVoy Jr. from Fannie Ferguson and Georgena N. Brazer, who had originally bought it from Joel Barnum Smith in 1903. The house was later rented by architect August Viemeister from 1935 until McVoy's estate was sold following his death in 1949. In 1950, the house was acquired by Allen L. Woodworth, who had an interest in antiques as well as colonial and post-colonial houses; Woodworth served as president of The Society for the Preservation of Long Island Antiquities from 1963 to 1973. He restored the house and furnished it with antiques. Woodworth died in 1982 at the age of 90, leaving the house and 10 acres (4.0 ha) of land to his wife. The remaining 20 acres (8.1 ha) of the estate were subdivided into a residential development named Dumplin' Hill Meadows.

The house was added to the National Register of Historic Places on September 26, 1985. It was also designated as a historic building by the Town of Huntington on March 23, 1993. After the death of Woodward's wife in 1995, the 10-acre (4.0 ha) estate was further subdivided, leaving the historic house and barns on a 2.34-acre (0.95 ha) parcel. The property was purchased by Pat and Bill Sayers in 1998, who restored the house and added riding trails and a riding ring for the horses they kept on the site.
