= Silas Sammis House =

Historic house in New York, United States

- U.S. National Register of Historic Places
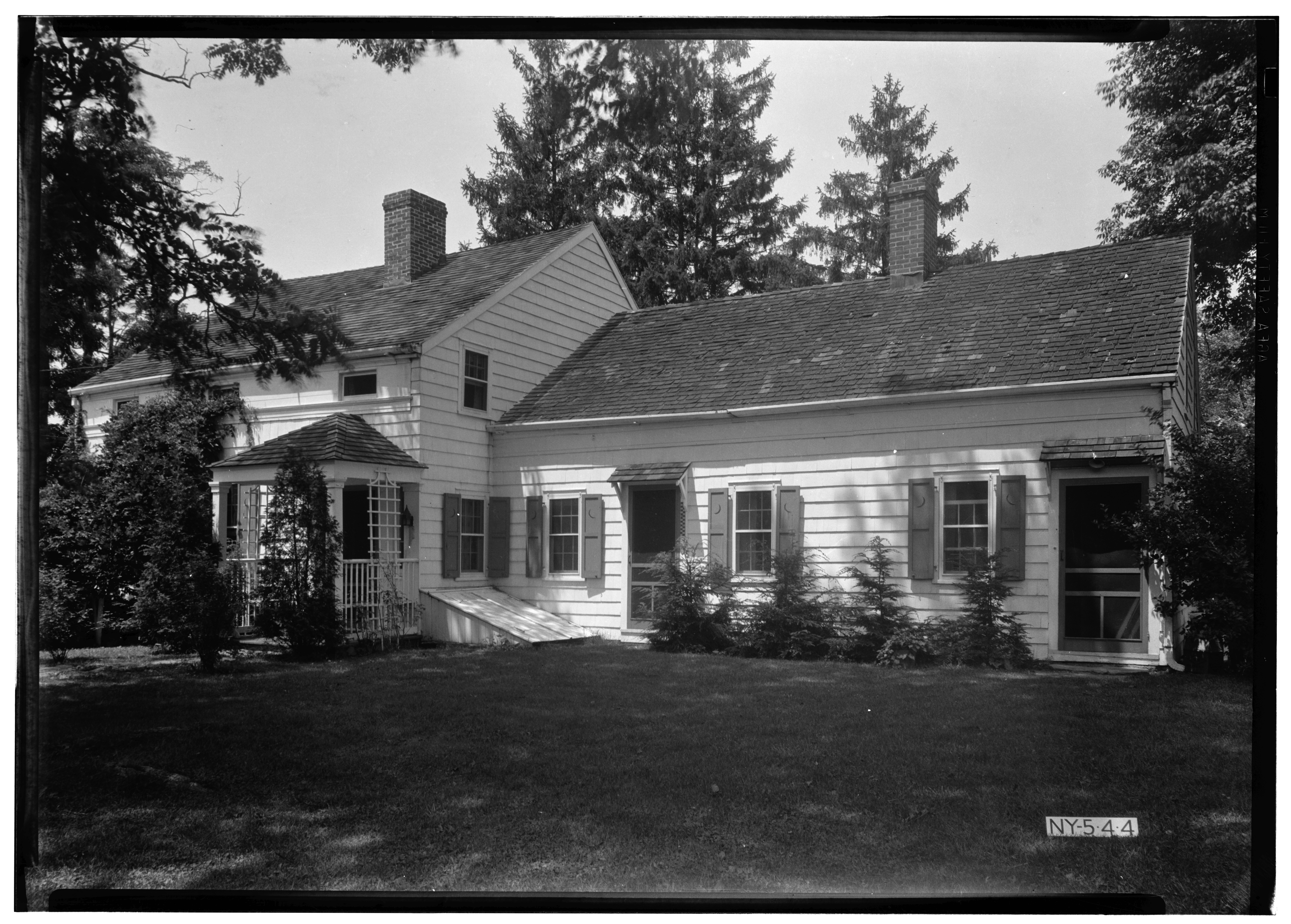
- HABS image of the Silas Sammis House

- Location within New York Location within the United States
- Location: 302 W. Neck Rd., Huntington, New York
- Coordinates: 40°53′9″N 73°26′23″W
- Area: 1.4 acres (0.57 ha)
- Built: 1730
- Architect: Sammis, Silas
- Architectural style: Greek Revival
- MPS: Huntington Town MRA
- NRHP reference No.: 85002573
- Added to NRHP: September 26, 1985

Silas Sammis House is a historic home located at Huntington in Suffolk County, New York. It consists of a 1 1/2-story, five-bay, shingled section built about 1730 and a larger, three-bay, 1 1/2-story shingled residence built about 1800. The small east wing was the original dwelling. It is an intact example of settlement period architecture in Huntington.

It was added to the National Register of Historic Places in 1985.
