= Josiah Woodhull House =

Historic house in New York, United States

- U.S. National Register of Historic Places
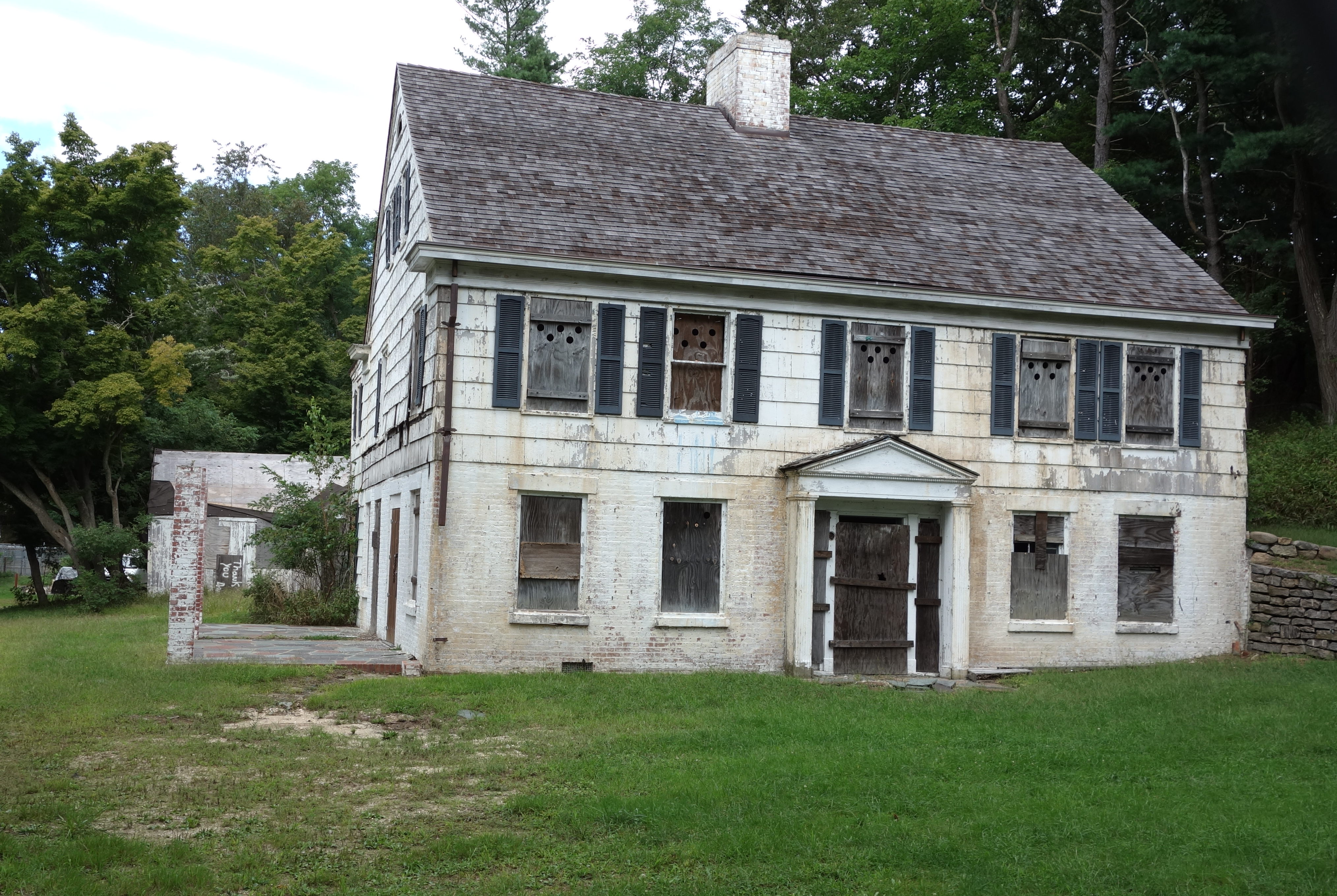
- Josiah Woodhull House amid restoration

- Location within New York Location within the United States
- Location: 170 North Country Rd., East Shoreham, New York
- Coordinates: 40°57′30″N 72°52′12″W
- Built: 1720s
- Architectural style: Colonial
- NRHP reference No.: 11000602
- Added to NRHP: 2011-08-24

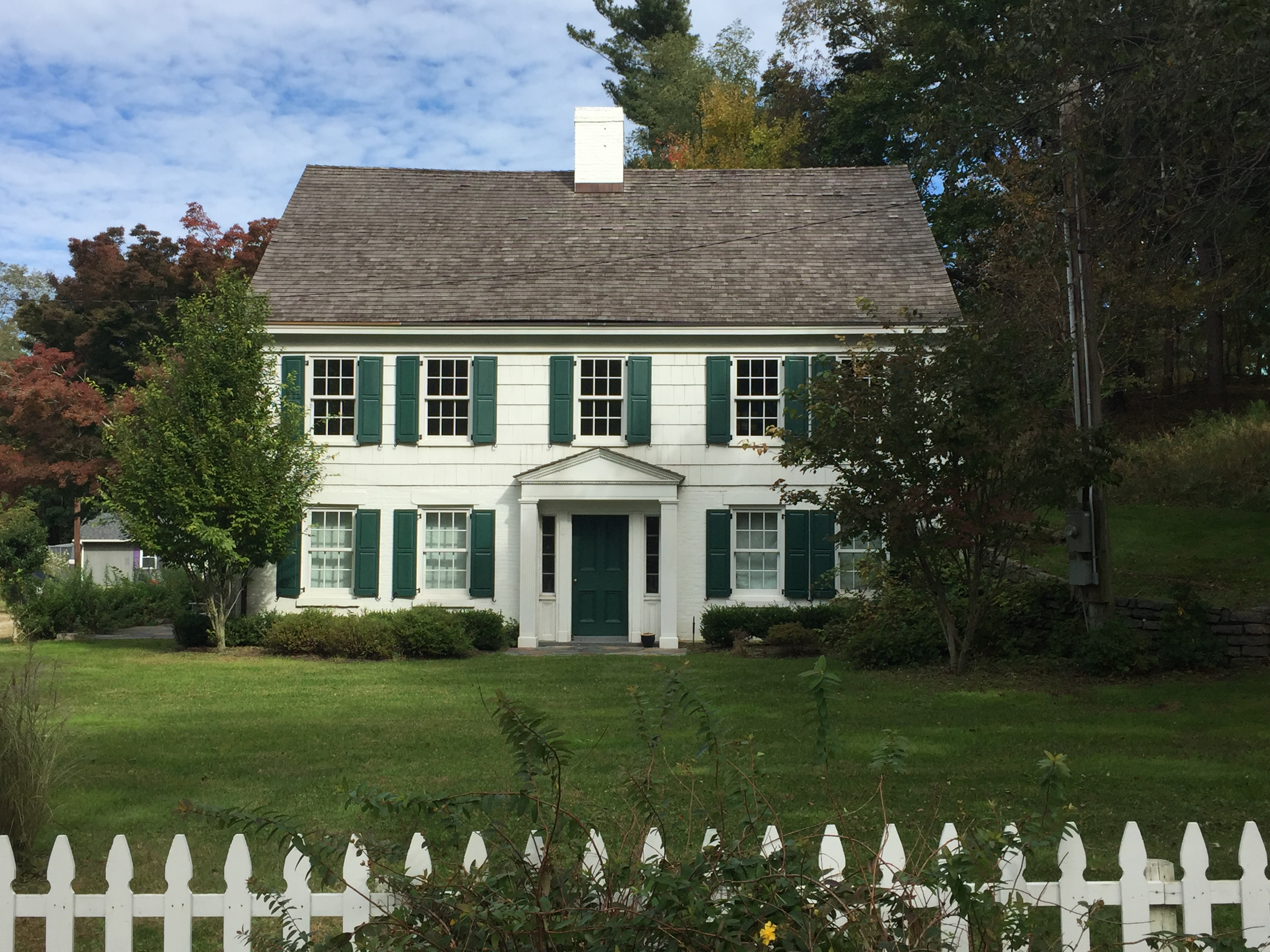
Josiah Woodhull House, after restoration.

The Josiah Woodhull House is a historic building. Built circa 1720 by the son of Richard Woodhull, the founder of Brookhaven Town. Located on the border of East Shoreham and Wading River, it is the oldest standing building in the area.

It was listed on the National Register of Historic Places in 2010.
