= Van Wyck-Lefferts Tide Mill =

- U.S. National Register of Historic Places
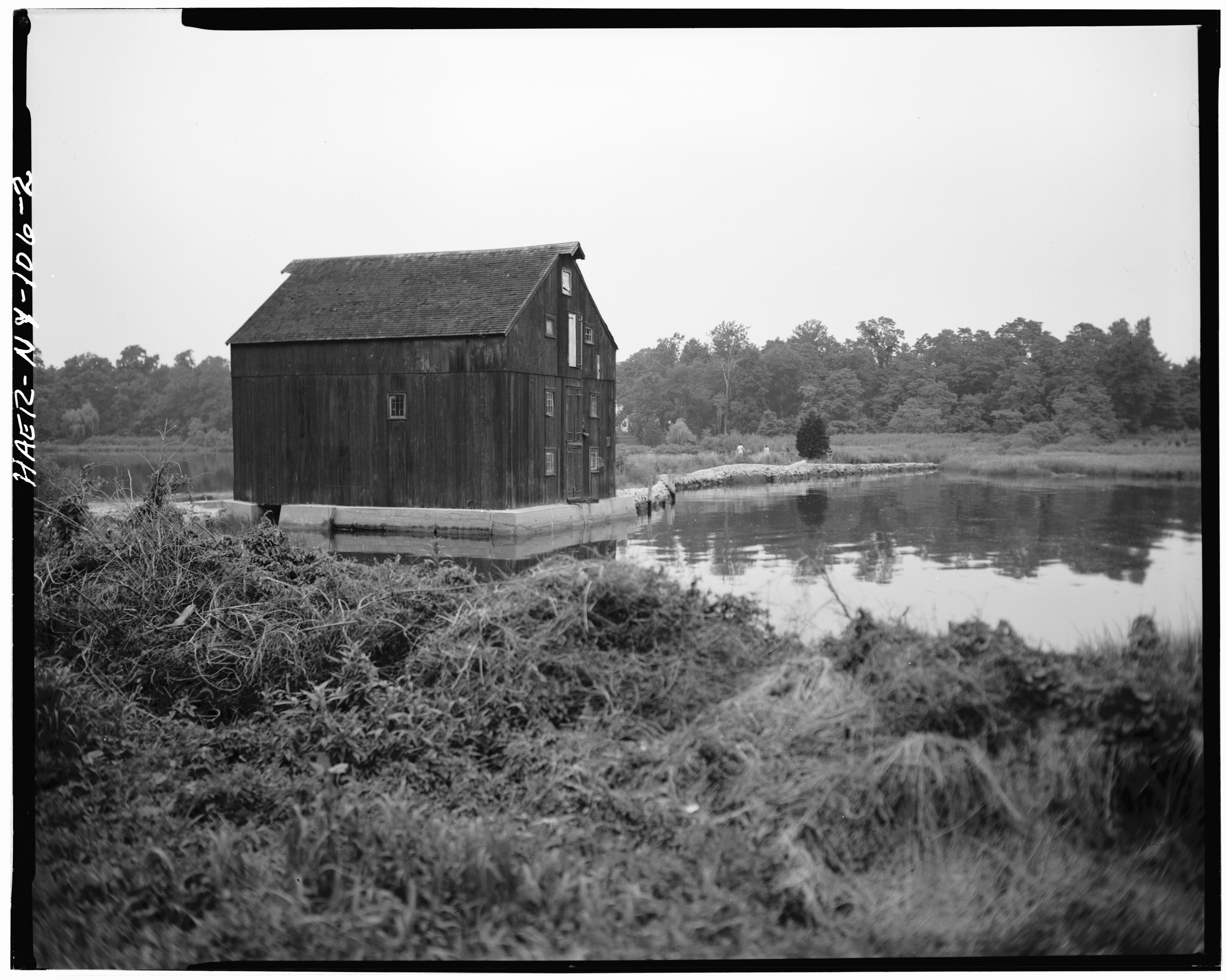
- HABS image of the mill

- Location within New York Location within the United States
- Location: 2 mi. NE of Mill and Southdown Rds., Lloyd Harbor, New York
- Coordinates: 40°53′59″N 73°26′42″W
- Area: 2 acres (0.81 ha)
- Built: 1793
- Architect: Van Wyck, Abraham
- MPS: Long Island Wind and Tide Mills TR
- NRHP reference No.: 78001916
- Added to NRHP: December 27, 1978

Van Wyck-Lefferts Tide Mill (/væn ˈwaɪk/ van WYKE) is a historic tide mill located at Lloyd Harbor in Suffolk County, New York. It was built about 1793 and is a 3 1/2-story, gable-roofed, timber-framed rectangular building little altered since the early 19th century. The property also includes the earthen mill dam with sluice gates.

It was added to the National Register of Historic Places in 1978.
