= Terry-Mulford House =

Historic house in New York, United States

- U.S. National Register of Historic Places
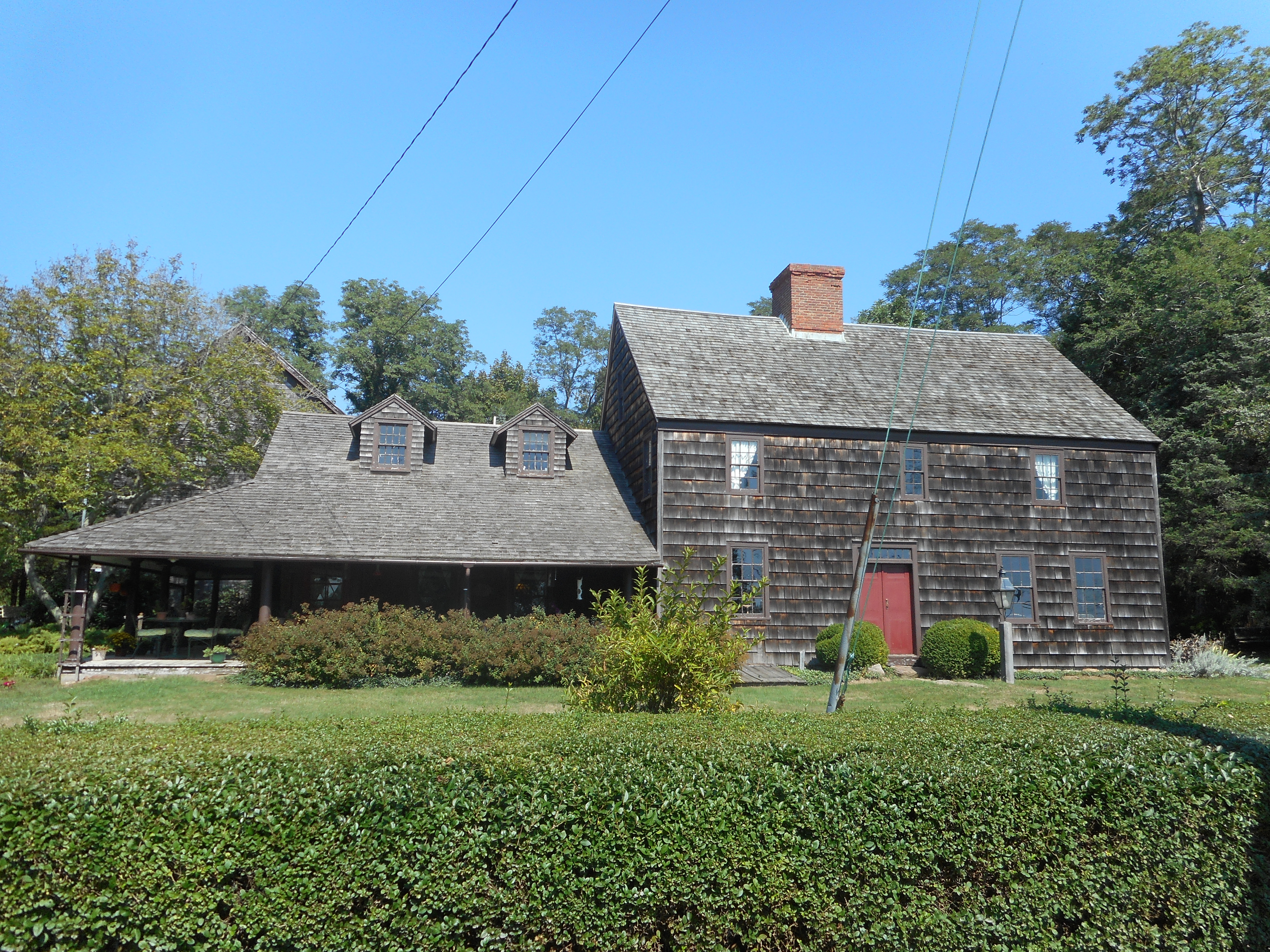
- The Terry-Mulford House as seen from NY 25

- Location within New York Location within the United States
- Location: NY 25, Orient, New York
- Coordinates: 41°9′6″N 72°16′38″W
- Area: 6 acres (2.4 ha)
- Built: 1716
- Architectural style: Saltbox
- NRHP reference No.: 84003003
- Added to NRHP: February 7, 1984

Terry-Mulford House is a historic home located at Orient in Suffolk County, New York. It was built in 1716, with later additions. A side wing was built about 1800 and third wing added in the early 20th century. Also on the property is a pyramidal-roofed well and small shed.

It was added to the National Register of Historic Places in 1984. The sign is incorrect; it was never a tavern
