= Joshua Wells House =

Historic house in New York, United States

- U.S. National Register of Historic Places
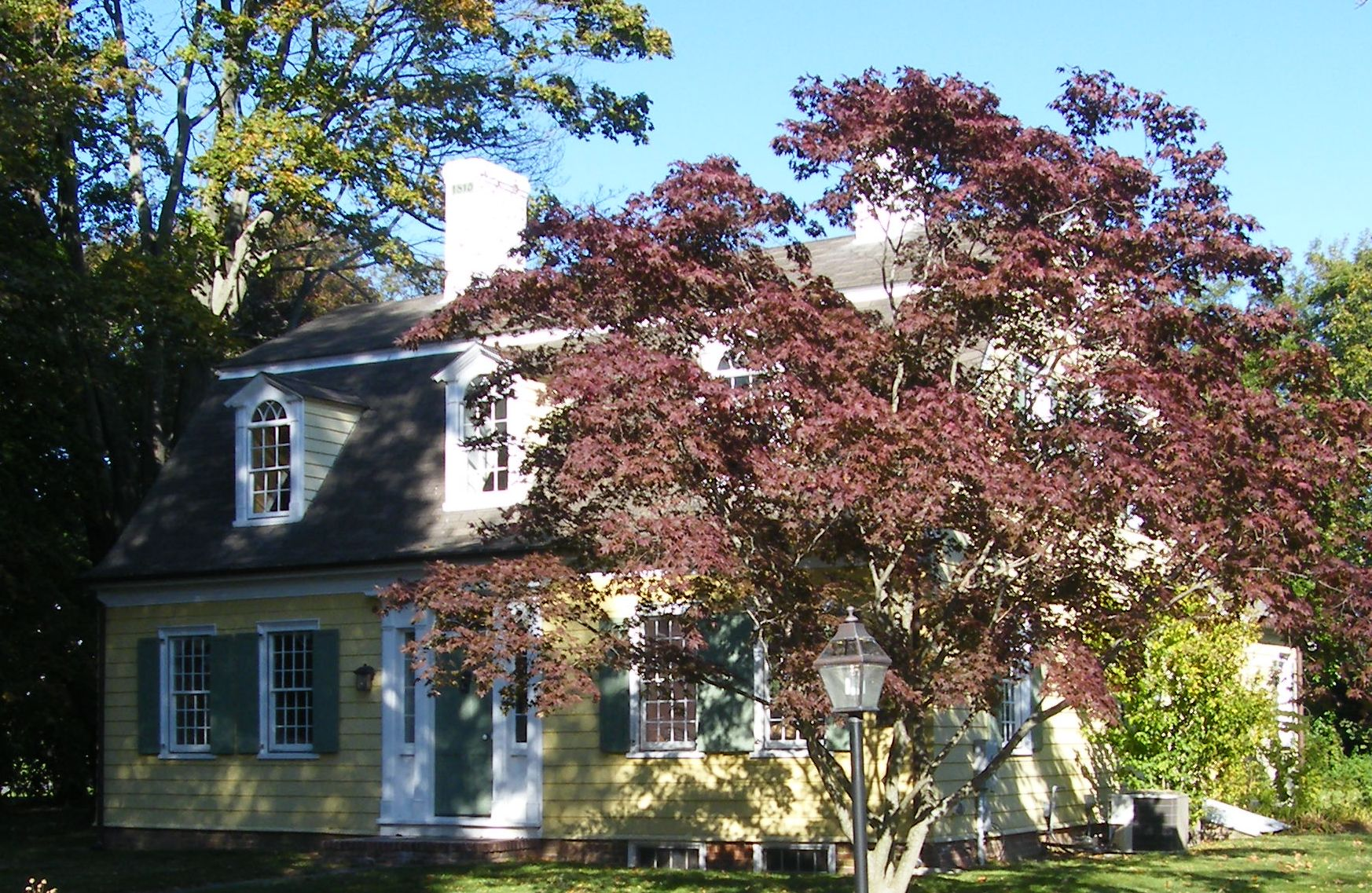
- Joshua Wells House, October 2008

- Location within New York Location within the United States
- Location: 525 N. Suffolk Rd., Cutchogue, New York
- Coordinates: 41°0′35″N 72°29′5″W
- Area: 1.6 acres (0.65 ha)
- Built: around 1680; 346 years ago
- Architectural style: Federal
- NRHP reference No.: 02000139
- Added to NRHP: March 6, 2002

Joshua Wells House, also known as Wells-Fleet-Goldsmith-Kendrick House and 1680 House, is a historic home located at Cutchogue in Suffolk County, New York. It is a 1 1/2-story, timber-framed residence constructed about 1680 and extensively remodeled in 1815. The house has been moved twice and now sits on a brick foundation constructed during its last move in 1857.

It was added to the National Register of Historic Places in 2002.
