= Willets Point Farmhouse =

Farmhouse in New York City

Coordinates: 40.7900°N 73.7813°W

The Willets Point Farmhouse is a double farmhouse at Fort Totten within Bay Terrace in Queens, New York City. It was built in 1829 in the Greek Revival style for Charles Willets, who had recently acquired the land surrounding the house. In 1867, the Farmhouse was expanded and renovated in Gothic Revival style. It was subdivided in the 20th century by the U.S. Army in order to provide officer housing for Fort Totten, and in the subdivision process, much of the original detailing was lost.

The building was abandoned by the Army in 1974 and the property was handed over to the City of New York. The farmhouse subsequently deteriorated and was vandalized despite the founding of the Fort Totten Historic District in 1999. In 2012, plans were made to renovate and stabilize the house, but as of 2018, it remains abandoned.
