= Ireland-Gardiner Farm =

Historic house in New York, United States

- U.S. National Register of Historic Places
- Location within New York Location within the United States
- Location: 863 Lake Rd., Greenlawn, New York
- Coordinates: 40°51′46″N 73°22′56″W
- Area: 24 acres (9.7 ha)
- Built: 1750
- Architect: Ireland, Jacob
- MPS: Huntington Town MRA
- NRHP reference No.: 85002537
- Added to NRHP: September 26, 1985

Ireland-Gardiner Farm is a historic home and farm complex located at Greenlawn in Suffolk County, New York. The original section of the main dwelling was built about 1750. It is a 1 1/2-story, shingled dwelling with a saltbox profile and a rear shed-roof addition. It has a central chimney and deep overhanging eaves. Also on the property are a barn, a corncrib, a shed, and a cottage.

It was added to the National Register of Historic Places in 1985.
