= Jericho Friends Meeting House Complex =

Historic meetinghouse in New York, United States

- U.S. National Register of Historic Places
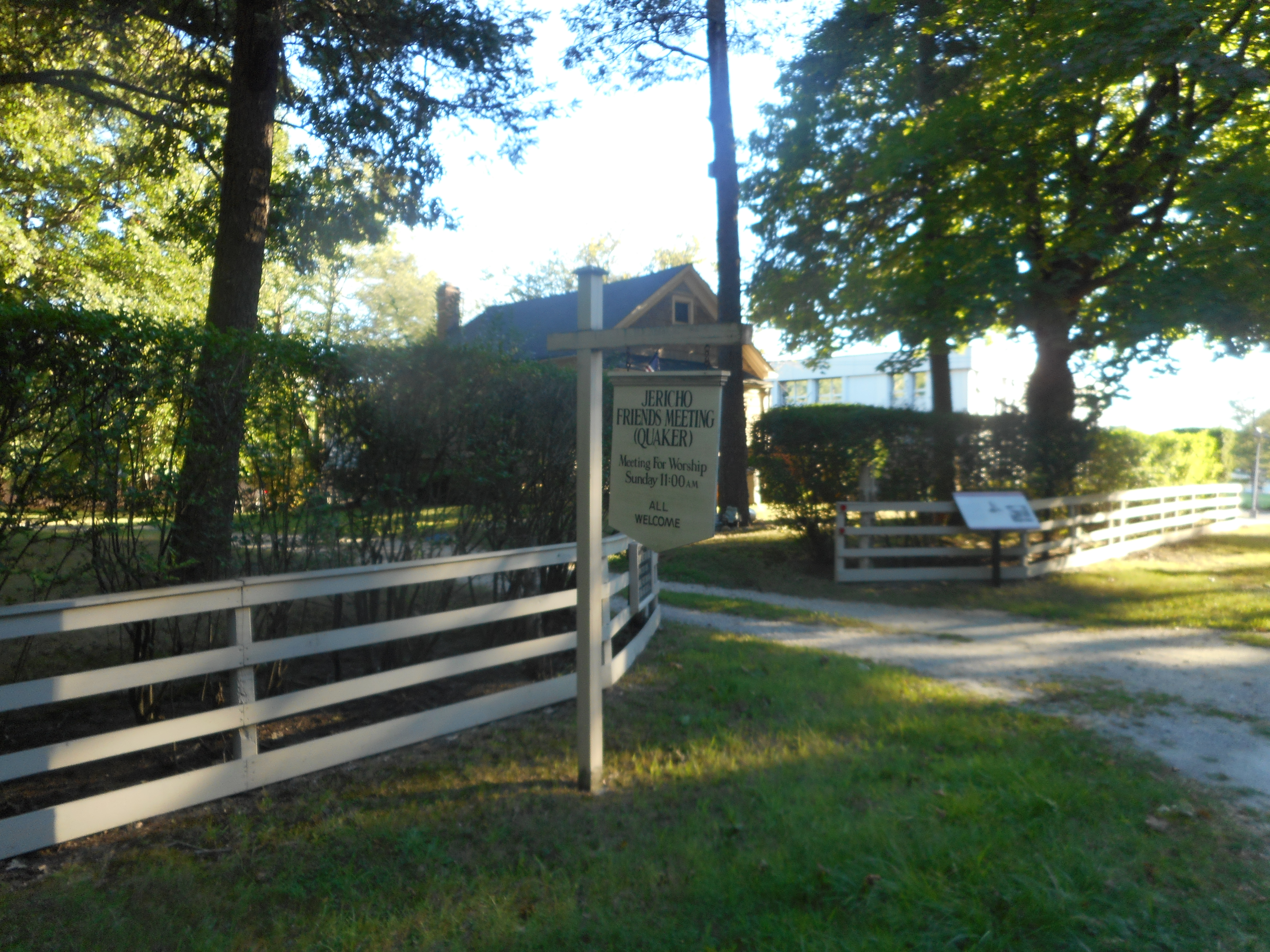

- Location within New York Location within the United States
- Location: 6 Old Jericho Turnpike, Jericho, New York
- Coordinates: 40°47′41.7″N 73°32′11.5″W
- Area: 3.3 acres (1.3 ha)
- NRHP reference No.: 02000473
- Added to NRHP: May 10, 2002

Jericho Friends Meeting House Complex is a historic Quaker meeting house complex located at 6 Old Jericho Turnpike in Jericho, Nassau County, New York.

== Description ==
The complex consists of the meetinghouse (1788), former Friends' schoolhouse (1793), a large gable roofed shed (ca. 1875), and the Friends' cemetery. The meeting house is a two-story, gable roofed timber-framed structure clad in wood shingles. One of the people who helped build the meeting house was preacher Elias Hicks (1748 – 1830), who is buried at the cemetery within the complex.

It was listed on the National Register of Historic Places in 2002.
