= Old Town =

Old town is the historic core of various cities.

Old Town or Old Towne may also refer to:

== Places ==
=== Bosnia and Herzegovina ===
- Old Town Sarajevo
- Old Town Mostar

=== Bulgaria ===
- Old Town (Plovdiv)

=== Canada ===
- Old Town, British Columbia
- Old Town Lunenburg, Nova Scotia
- Old Town, Toronto

=== China ===
- Old Town of Lijiang
- Old Town of Shanghai

=== Czech Republic ===
- Old Town (Prague)

=== Germany ===
- Old town Osnabrück
- Old town of Regensburg with Stadtamhof

=== Ireland ===
- Old Town, County Roscommon
- Oldtown, County Dublin
- Oldtown, Letterkenny

=== Jerusalem ===
- Old City (Jerusalem)

=== Kenya ===
- Mombasa Old Town, Kenya

=== Libya ===
- Old Town of Ghadamès, Libya

=== Lithuania ===
- Kaunas Old Town
- Vilnius Old Town

=== Malaysia ===
- Old Town, Petaling Jaya

=== Norway ===
- Old Town, Oslo

=== Poland ===
- Białystok Osiedle Centrum
- Bydgoszcz Old City
- Gdańsk Old Town
- Kraków Old Town
- Lublin Old Town
- Opole Old Town
- Police Old Town
- Poznań Old Town
- Warsaw Old Town
- Osiedle Staromiejskie (Neighbourhood of Old Town), Warsaw
- Wrocław Old Town
- Zamość Old City

=== Serbia ===
- Old Town (Ivanjica)

=== Slovakia ===
- Old Town, Bratislava

=== Sri Lanka ===
- Old Town of Galle and its Fortifications

=== Sweden ===
- Old Town of Stockholm

=== Switzerland ===
- Old Town of Bern

=== Ukraine ===
- Old Town (Lviv)

=== United Kingdom ===
- Old Town, Barnsley, England
- Old Town, Chard, England
- Old Town, Croydon, England
- Old Town, Edinburgh, Scotland
- Old Town, Isles of Scilly, England
- Old Town, Mansergh, a hamlet in Mansergh, Cumbria, England
- Old Town, Stevenage, England
- Old Town (Swindon ward), electoral ward
- Old Town, West Yorkshire, England

=== United States ===
- Old Town (Franklin, Tennessee)
- Old Town (Key West), Florida
- Old Town (Lansing, Michigan)
- Old Town (Mississippi)
- Old Town, Baltimore, Maryland
- Old Town, California (disambiguation), several places, including:
  - Old Town, Kern County, California
  - Old Town, Marin County, California
  - Old Towne, Orange Historic District in the city of Orange
  - Old Town (Simonian Farms)
  - Old Towne, a former shopping and entertainment center in Torrance
- Old Town, Calhoun County, Mississippi
- Old Town, Chicago, Illinois
- Old Town, Florida
- Old Town, Indiana
- Old Town, Maine
- Old Town, North Carolina (disambiguation), several places, including:
  - Old Town, Brunswick County, North Carolina
  - Old Town, Forsyth County, North Carolina
- Old Town, San Diego, California
- Old Town, Staten Island, New York
- Old Town Albuquerque, New Mexico
- Old Town Center Historic District, Eastham, Massachusetts
- Old Town Chinatown, Portland, Oregon
- Old Town Eureka, California
- Old Town Fairfax, Virginia
- Old Town Pasadena, California
- Oldtown, Idaho
- Oldtown, Kentucky
- Old Town, Wichita, Kansas
- Old Town (house)

== Music ==
- "Old Town" (song), 1982 song by Phil Lynott
- Old Town Records, American record label which existed 1953–1966

== Transit ==
- Old Town station (A-train), Lewisville, Texas, United States
- Old Town station (Staten Island Railway), New York, United States
- Old Town Transit Center, San Diego, California, United States
- Old Town/Chinatown MAX Station, Portland, Oregon, United States
- King Street–Old Town station, Alexandria, Virginia, United States
- Oldtown railway station, Letterkenny, Ireland

== Other uses ==
- Old Town (A Song of Ice and Fire), a city in the A Song of Ice and Fire series
- Old Town (amusement park), in Kissimmee, Florida, USA
- The Old Town, an open-air museum in Aarhus, Denmark
- Old Town Canoe, a canoe manufacturer

== See also ==
- Torrance Promenade, a shopping mall in Torrance, California, formerly known as Old Towne
- Old City (disambiguation)
- Old Town Historic District (disambiguation)
- Old Town Township (disambiguation)
- Oldtown (disambiguation)
- "There'll Be a Hot Time in the Old Town Tonight"
- Old Town Cemetery (disambiguation)
- Stare Miasto (disambiguation)
- Altstadt, a German term with a similar meaning
- Furuichi (disambiguation), a Japanese term with a similar meaning
