= Old Town Historic District =

Old Town Historic District may refer to:

in the United States

(by state then city)

- Old Town Historic District (Huntsville, Alabama), listed on the National Register of Historic Places (NRHP)
- Old Town Historic District (Selma, Alabama), NRHP-listed
- Old Town, Eureka, California, NRHP-listed
- Monterey Old Town Historic District, Monterey, California, listed on the NRHP in California
- Old Towne, Orange Historic District, Orange, California, NRHP-listed
- Old Town San Diego State Historic Park, San Diego, California, NRHP-listed
- Old Town Fort Collins, Fort Collins, Colorado, listed on the NRHP in Colorado
- Old Town Hall Commercial Historic District, Wilmington, Delaware, NRHP-listed
- Historic Old Town Commercial District, Lake Worth Beach, Florida, NRHP-listed
- Old Town Sebastian Historic District, East, Sebastian, Florida, NRHP-listed
- Old Town Sebastian Historic District, West, Sebastian, Florida, NRHP-listed
- Brunswick Old Town, Brunswick, Georgia, listed on the NRHP in Georgia
- Brunswick Old Town Historic District, Brunswick, Georgia, listed on the NRHP in Georgia
- Old Town Triangle Historic District, Chicago, Illinois, listed on the NRHP in Illinois
- Old Town Historic District (Ames, Iowa), listed on the NRHP in Iowa
- Old Town Historic District (Hartford, Kentucky), listed on the NRHP in Kentucky
- Boxborough Old Town Center, Boxborough, Massachusetts, listed on the NRHP in Massachusetts
- Old Town Center Historic District, Eastham, Massachusetts, listed on the NRHP in Massachusetts
- Old Town Historic District (North Attleborough, Massachusetts), listed on the NRHP in Massachusetts
- Old Town Hall Historic District (Salem, Massachusetts), listed on the NRHP in Massachusetts
- Old Town Historic District (Kansas City, Missouri), listed on the NRHP in Missouri
- Old Town Residential Historic District (Las Vegas, New Mexico), listed on the NRHP in New Mexico
- Old Town Green Historic District, Huntington, New York, listed on the NRHP in New York
- Old Town Hall Historic District (Huntington, New York), listed on the NRHP in New York
- Old Town Plantation, Battleboro, North Carolina, listed on the NRHP in North Carolina
- Old Town Historic District (Bend, Oregon), listed on the NRHP in Oregon
- Portland Skidmore/Old Town Historic District, Portland, OR, listed on the NRHP in Oregon
- Old Town Historic District (Clearfield, Pennsylvania), listed on the NRHP in Pennsylvania
- Museums and historical sites (Bluffton, SC)
- Old Town (Franklin, Tennessee), listed on the NRHP in Tennessee
- Old Town Historic District (Arlington, Texas), listed on the NRHP in Texas
- Old Town Residential Historic District (Palestine, Texas), listed on the NRHP in Texas
- Old Town Historic District (Harrisonburg, Virginia), listed on the NRHP in Virginia
- Petersburg Old Town Historic District, Petersburg, Virginia, listed on the NRHP in Virginia
- Ravenswood "Old Town" Historic District, Ravenswood, West Virginia, listed on the NRHP in West Virginia

== See also ==
- Old Town (disambiguation)
- Old Town Hall Historic District (disambiguation)
- Old Town Residential Historic District (disambiguation)
