= Old Town, North Carolina =

Old Town, North Carolina may refer to:

- Old Town, Brunswick County, North Carolina, United States
- Old Town, Forsyth County, North Carolina, United States
  - Old Town Township, Forsyth County, North Carolina

== See also ==
- Old Fort, North Carolina, United States
- Old Town (disambiguation)
