= St. Catherine's Church, Osnabrück =

Church in Osnabrück, Germany

Coordinates: 52.2732°N 8.0427°E

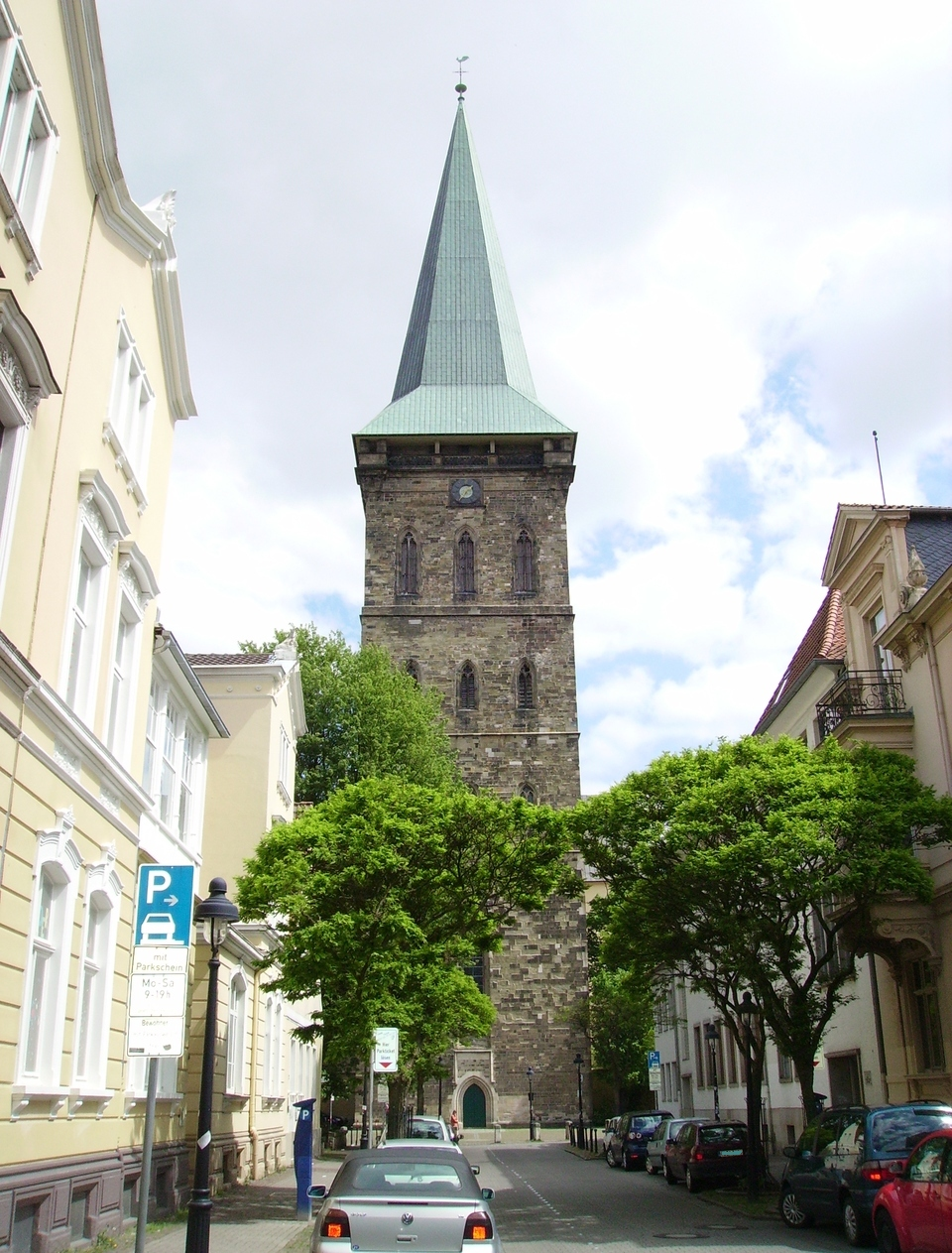

St. Catherine's Church, also known as the St. Katharinenkirche in German, is a late Gothic hall Evangelical church in the old town of Osnabrück, Germany. Its tower, which can be seen from afar and has shaped the cityscape for centuries, is 103 metres (338 ft) high.

== Building history ==
In the first half of the 13th century, a small church was built in front of the walls of the Osnabrück inland castle in the area of the town courts of the nobility. Catherine is mentioned. The choice of the patron saint is probably due to the veneration of St. Catherine, which pilgrims returning from the Holy Land introduced to Osnabrück. The current building was erected from around 1300 with several interruptions and was largely completed around 1500. In 1543 the Reformation was introduced in St. Katharinen. During the peace negotiations from 1643 to 1648 she offered the Swedish legation space for worship and meetings. The proximity of the castle, which had been built since 1669 and which served as the residence of the evangelical prince-bishops of Osnabrück from 1673, was the reason why St. Catherine's was also used as a court church.

In 1868 the baroque top of the church tower caught fire during renovation work. The construction of the new church spire lasted until 1880.

Towards the end of World War II, St. Katharinen fell victim to the flames as a result of bombing during the last of the air raids on Osnabrück on March 25, 1945, a Palm Sunday . The church was reopened in 1950. In 1990 it had to be closed for a major overhaul of the interior that had become necessary. After extensive renovation work, the church was reopened in November 1992 and is characterized today by a simple, clear architecture. Together with the castle, the Poggenburg, the Ledenhof, the monastery walls of the barefoot monastery and the old rectory, the church forms a remarkable ensemble from the olden days. The interior is shaped by the will to form Gothic . A restrained modern design sets special accents and invites you to contemplate and meditate. In addition to the church services, art exhibitions and concerts take place again and again in St. Katharinen. Handouts are available for church educational investigations.

In the bell tower hangs a 4-part bell of the Bochum club.

== Organ ==
The Paul Ott workshop built the organ of St. Katharinen in 1961. Since it was no longer economically viable to overhaul the old organ by Paul Ott, the church council of St. Katharinen decided to build a new organ with the name Friedensorgel. A support association was founded for the Peace Organ, which implemented the planning and financing together with St. Catherine's Church. The old organ was dismantled in 2022 and sold to a town in Lithuania.

The patrons of the organ building project are former Federal President Christian Wulff and Regional Bishop Ralf Meister. The new organ was built by the Swiss company Metzler Orgelbau from Dietikon and was originally supposed to be completed in 2018. Financing difficulties delayed the start of construction. The first phase of construction of the Peace Organ was completed in April 2023. The first phase of construction of the organ was inaugurated on April 9, 2023 (Easter Sunday) in St. Catherine's Church as part of a festive service in the presence of former Federal President Wulff.

The current disposition is as follows (the missing construction phases are put in brackets).

== Bells ==
The Katharinenkirche has the second largest bell in the city of Osnabrück. They were cast in 1955 by the Cast Steel Works Bochumer Verein and were played for the first time on December 11, 1955.

== Patronage ==
The church bears the name of St. Catherine. According to legend, the learned prince's daughter from Alexandria turned to Christianity at the beginning of the 4th century. Catherine converted fifty of the Roman emperor's most famous scholars to the Christian faith and reproached the emperor Maximus : "Your gods are empty delusions". Then he had them put to the sword.

== Parish ==
The parish has around 7,000 members. It is divided into two parishes, each with one parish. The pastoral positions are currently divided among four pastors with different positions. There is also a full-time deaconess / social worker, a sexton, a cantor and several volunteers. A daughter church of St. Katharinen was the Lutherkirche in Neustadt until 1927, which was built between 1907 and 1909 and is decorated with Art Nouveau paintings. This is now independent.

The St. Katharinenkirche runs its own day-care center and crèche in Osnabrück. In four regular groups, 25 children between the ages of three and school age are cared for by two pedagogical specialists.

In addition to the day-care center, the parish managed an urban gardening project. Citizens of Osnabrück have the opportunity to grow their own fruit and vegetables in several raised beds.
