= Stare Mesto =

Staré Město or Staré Mesto may refer to places:

== Czech Republic ==
- Old Town (Prague) (Czech: Staré Město), historical part of Prague
- Staré Město (Bruntál District), a municipality and village in the Moravian-Silesian Region
- Staré Město (Frýdek-Místek District), a municipality and village in the Moravian-Silesian Region
- Staré Město (Šumperk District), a town in the Olomouc Region
- Staré Město (Svitavy District), a municipality and village in the Pardubice Region
- Staré Město (Uherské Hradiště District), a town in the Zlín Region
- Staré Město (Karviná), a part of Karviná in the Moravian-Silesian Region
- Staré Město (Třinec), a part of Třinec in the Moravian-Silesian Region
- Staré Město nad Metují, a part of Náchod in the Hradec Králové Region
- Čáslav-Staré Město, a part of Čáslav in the Central Bohemian Region
- Děčín III-Staré Město, a part of Děčín in the Ústí nad Labem Region
- Liberec I-Staré Město, a part of Liberec in the Liberec Region
- Pardubice-Staré Město, a part of Pardubice in the Liberec Region
- Telč-Staré Město, a part of Telč in the Vysočina Region
- Staré Město pod Landštejnem, a market town in the Olomouc Region

== Slovakia ==
- Old Town, Bratislava (Slovak: Staré Mesto), Bratislava
- Old Town, Košice (Slovak: Staré Mesto), Košice

== See also ==
- Old Town (disambiguation)
- Stare Miasto (disambiguation)
