= Stare Misto =

Stare Misto may refer to:

- Stare Misto, Ukraine, a village in Ternopil Raion, Ternopil Oblast
- Old Town (Lviv) (Ukrainian: Старе Місто Львова, romanized: Stare Misto L’vova), a district of Lviv, Ukraine
- Stare Misto (music festival), an annual festival in Lviv, Ukraine, 2007–2013
- Staré Místo, a municipality and village in the Czech Republic

== See also ==
- Stare Miasto (disambiguation)
- Old Town (disambiguation)
