= Old Town Hall Historic District =

Old Town Hall Historic District may refer to:

- Old Town Hall Commercial Historic District, Wilmington, Delaware
- Old Town Hall Historic District (Salem, Massachusetts), now part of the Downtown Salem District
- Old Town Hall Historic District (Huntington, New York)

== See also ==
- Old Town Historic District (disambiguation)
