= Old Town Township =

Old Town Township may refer to the following townships in the United States:

- Old Town Township, McLean County, Illinois
- Old Town Township, Forsyth County, North Carolina
