= Furuichi =

Furuichi (written: 古市) is a Japanese surname and place name. Furuichi can be translated as "old town" or "old market". It may refer to:

== People ==
- Furuichi clan (古市氏), a Japanese clan
- Furuichi Chōin (古市澄胤; 1452–1508), minor Japanese lord and tea ceremony aficionado
- Furuichi Ryōwa (古市了和; died 1657), Japanese tea master
- Furuichi Taneshige (古市胤重; 1624–1658), Samurai of the Kaga Domain
- Furuichi Kanemoto (古市務本; 1642–1677), Samurai of the Kaga Domain and Confucian scholar
- Furuichi Kōi (古市公威; 1854–1934), Japanese civil engineer
- Furuichi Risaburō (古市利三郎; 1866–1944), Japanese educator
- Furuichi Masakazu (古市昌一; born 1958), Japanese computer scientist
- Kotaro Furuichi (古市コータロー; born c. 1964), guitarist for the Japanese rock band The Collectors
- Furuichi Sachiko (古市幸子; born 1973), former announcer for Nippon Television
- Furuichi Sadahide (古市貞秀; born 1976), Japanese sumo wrestler
- Noritoshi Furuichi (古市憲寿; born 1985), Japanese sociologist and author
- Masako Furuichi (古市雅子; born 1996), Japanese freestyle wrestler

== Places ==
- Furuichi Castle (古市城), a medieval Japanese castle in Nara Prefecture which was built by the Furuichi Clan prior to 1444 and destroyed in 1543
- Furuichi Kofun Group (古市古墳群)), a group of one hundred and twenty-three kofun (tumuli) in Fujiidera and Habikino, Osaka Prefecture, Japan
- Furuichi Station (disambiguation) (古市駅), several train stations
- Furuichi Town (Maebashi) (古市町 (前橋市)), a town in Maebashi, Gunma Prefecture, Japan
- Furuichi Town (Hiroshima) (古市町 (広島県)), a former town in Asa District, Yamaguchi, Hiroshima Prefecture, Japan. By 1973 it had been merged with Hiroshima City
- Furuichi Town (Osaka) (古市町 (大阪府)), a former town in Osaka Prefecture, Japan in present-day Habikino. Furuichi Town was abolished in 1956.
- Furuichi (古市 (広島市)), a place in Asaminami Ward, Hiroshima City, Japan

== See also ==
- Old Town (disambiguation)
