= Nowe Miasto =

Nowe Miasto (meaning "new town") is a common place-name in Poland.

There are three Polish towns called Nowe Miasto:

- Nowe Miasto, Płońsk County in Masovian Voivodeship (east-central Poland)
- Nowe Miasto Lubawskie in Warmian-Masurian Voivodeship (north-east Poland), seat of Nowe Miasto County
- Nowe Miasto nad Pilicą in Masovian Voivodeship (east-central Poland)

The following (despite the name) is not a town but a village:

- Nowe Miasto nad Wartą in Greater Poland Voivodeship (west-central Poland)

The following are districts or neighbourhoods within cities:

- Nowe Miasto, Białystok
- Nowe Miasto, Kraków, part of the district of Stare Miasto
- Nowe Miasto, Poznań
- Nowe Miasto, Szczecin
- Nowe Miasto, Warsaw
- Nowe Miasto, Wałbrzych

Nowe Miasto may also refer to:

- Nowe Miasto Korczyn, former name of Nowy Korczyn, a town in Świętokrzyskie Voivodeship
- Nowe Miasto, Polish name for Naujamiestis, Panevėžys, town in northern Lithuania
- Nowe Miasto, Polish name for Žemaičių Naumiestis, town in western Lithuania

== See also ==
- Stare Miasto (disambiguation)
