= Furuichi Station =

Furuichi Station (古市駅, Furuichi Eki) can refer to:

- Furuichi Station (Ōsaka), a station on the Kintetsu lines in Hibakino, Ōsaka Prefecture, Japan
- Furuichi Station (Hyōgo), a station on the JR West Fukuchiyama Line in Sasayama, Hyogō Prefecture, Japan
- Furuichi Station (Hiroshima), a station on the Astram Line in Hiroshima, Hiroshima Prefecture, Japan
- Furuichibashi Station (古市橋駅), a station on the JR West Kabe Line in Hiroshima, Hiroshima Prefecture, Japan
- Nagato-Furuichi Station (長門古市駅), a JR West station in Nagato, Yamaguchi Prefecture, Japan
- Shimmori-Furuichi Station (新森古市駅), a train station on the Osaka Metro Imazatosuji Line in Asahi-ku, Osaka, Japan

== See also ==
- Furuichi (disambiguation)
