= Old Town Residential Historic District =

Old Town Residential Historic District may refer to:

- Old Town Residential Historic District (Pocatello, Idaho), listed in the NRHP in Idaho
- Old Town Residential Historic District (Las Vegas, New Mexico), listed on the NRHP in New Mexico
- Old Town Residential Historic District (Palestine, Texas), listed on the NRHP in Texas
