= Stare Miasto =

Stare Miasto means "Old Town" in Polish. It may refer to the following places:

== City districts ==
- Stare Miasto, Gdańsk
- Stare Miasto, Kraków (for the specific neighbourhood, see Kraków Old Town)
- Stare Miasto, Police
- Stare Miasto, Poznań (for the specific neighbourhood, see Poznań Old Town)
- Stare Miasto, Szczecin
- Stare Miasto, Warsaw
- Stare Miasto, Wrocław (for the specific neighbourhood, see Wrocław Old Town)
- Stare Miasto, Polish name for Staré Město (Třinec) in the Czech Republic

== Villages ==
- Stare Miasto, Konin County in Greater Poland Voivodeship (west-central Poland)
- Stare Miasto, Subcarpathian Voivodeship (south-east Poland)
- Stare Miasto, Szamotuły County in Greater Poland Voivodeship (west-central Poland)
- Stare Miasto, Pomeranian Voivodeship (north Poland)
- Stare Miasto, Warmian-Masurian Voivodeship (north Poland)

== Other ==
- Gmina Stare Miasto, Konin County, Greater Poland Voivodeship

== See also ==
- Old Town (disambiguation)
- Nowe Miasto (disambiguation), meaning "new town"
- Stare Misto (disambiguation)
- Stare Mesto (disambiguation)
