= Old Town Cemetery =

Old Town Cemetery may refer to:

- Old Town Cemetery (Newburgh, New York), listed on the NRHP
- Old Town Cemetery (Claiborne Parish, Louisiana)

or to cemeteries in any of many Old Towns in the U.S. or elsewhere

== See also ==
- Old Town (disambiguation)
