= Old Town (Plovdiv) =

Old town in Plovdiv
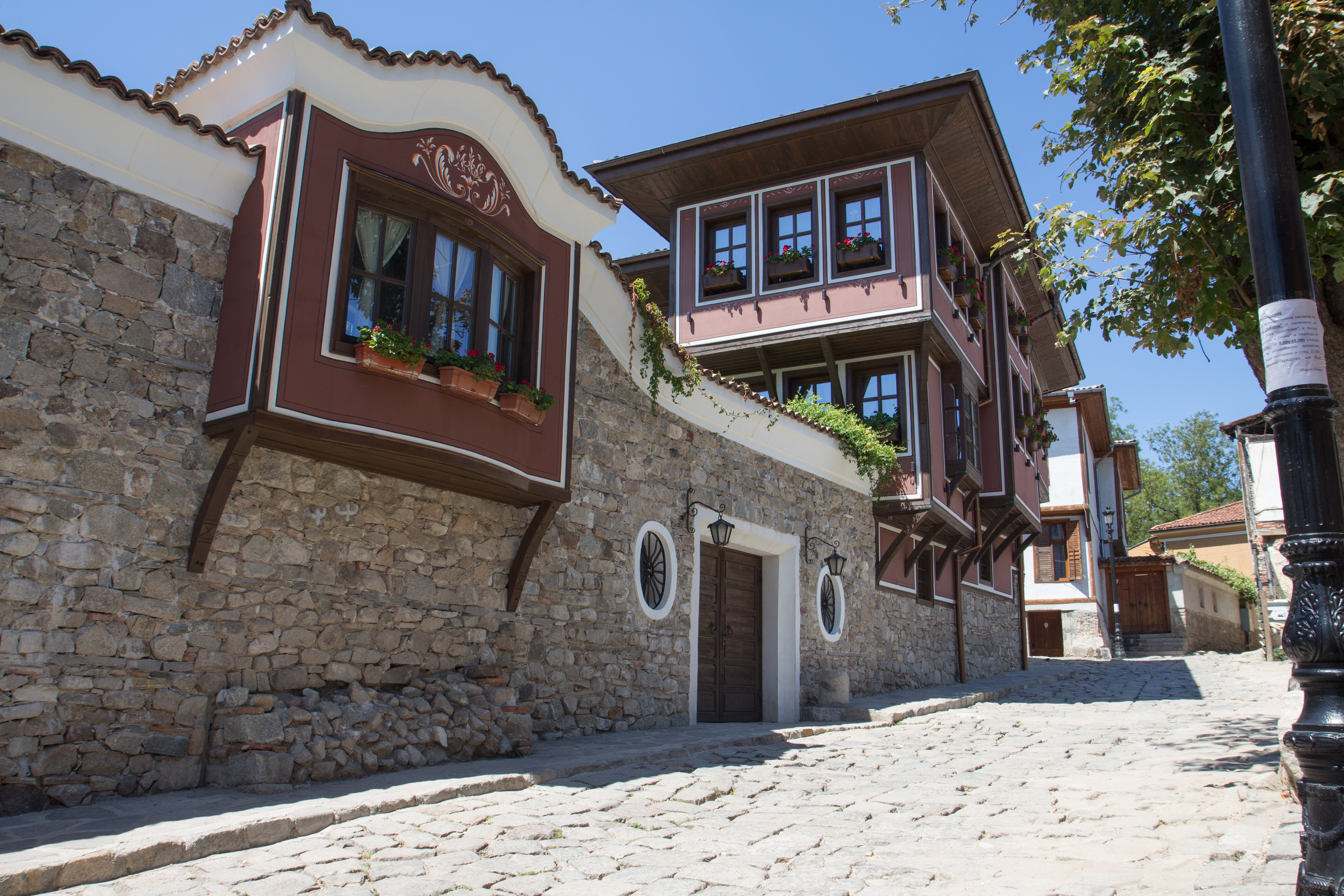

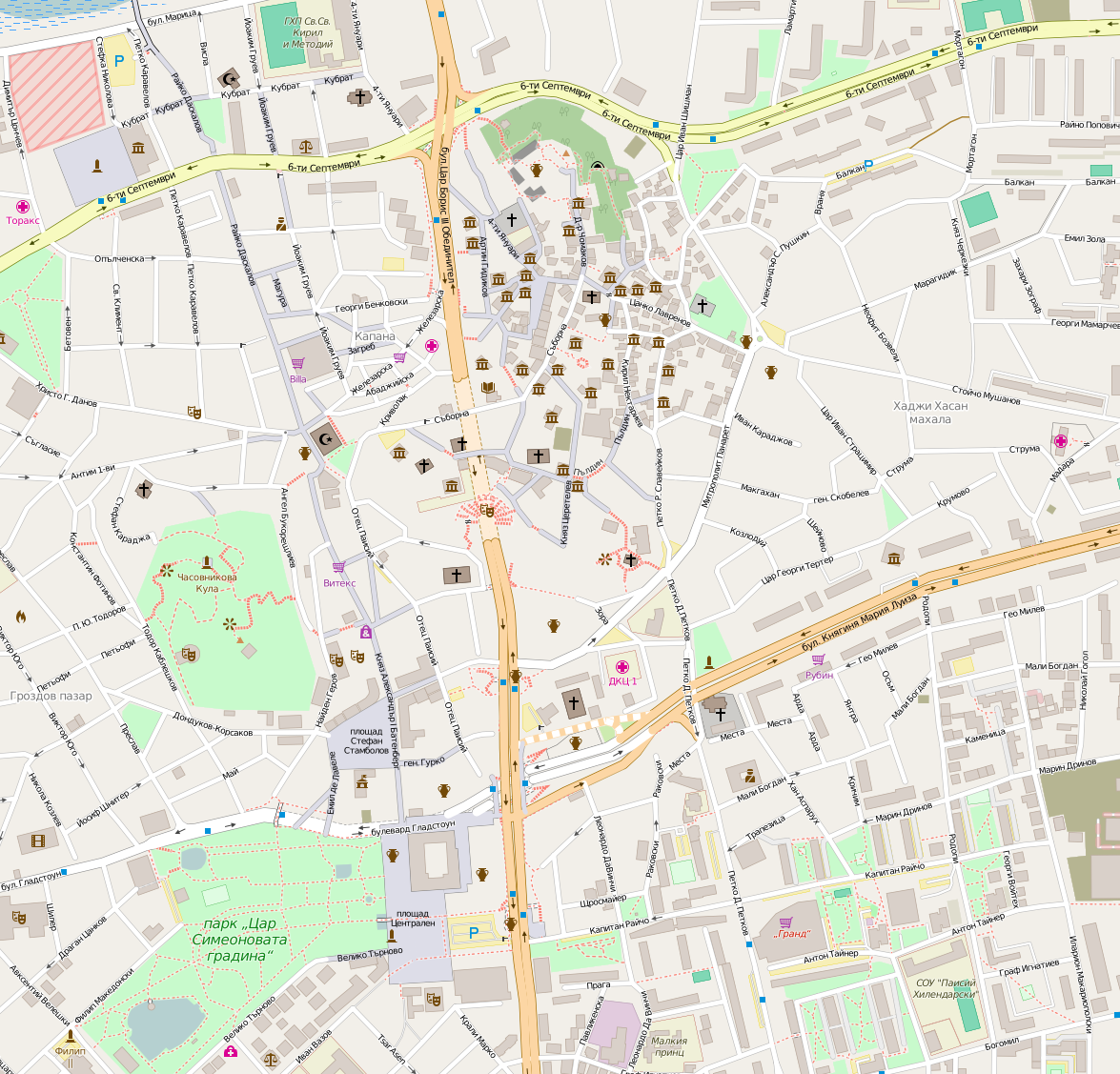
- Location within Plovdiv City Center
- 42.149824°N 24.752665°E
- Location: Plovdiv, Bulgaria

History
- Built: Thracian settlement: 4000 BC; Hellenic settlement: 342 BC; Roman settlement:46 AD; Revival houses: 1800-1900

Site notes
- Area: 35 ha (86 acres)

The old town in Plovdiv is an architectural and historical reserve located on three of Plovdiv's hills: Nebet Tepe, Dzhambaz Tepe and Taksim Tepe.

The complex has been formed as a result of the long sequence of habitation from prehistoric times to present day and combines the culture and architecture from Antiquity, Middle Ages and Bulgarian revival. The old town in Plovdiv is included in UNESCO World Heritage tentative list since 2004.

== Ancient monuments ==
Ancient monuments in Plovdiv's old town

=== Nebet Tepe ===
Nebet Tepe is one of the hills of Plovdiv where the ancient town was founded. The earliest settlements on Nebet Tepe are dated back to 4000 BC. The site was first settled by Thracians, later expanded by Philip II of Macedon and the Roman Empire. As the town expanded, Nebet Tepe became the citadel of the town's acropolis. There are remains of a fortress walls, towers, and a postern from the time of Justinian leading down to the Maritsa river.

=== Ancient theatre ===
The Roman theatre of Plovdiv is one of the world's best-preserved ancient theatres. It was constructed during Roman Emperor Trajan (reigned 98–117 AD), it can host between 5000 and 7000 spectators and it is currently in use. The theatre is one of the most valuable monuments from the ancient city of Philippopolis.

=== Hisar Kapia ===
Hisar Kapia is a medieval gate in Plovdiv's old town built in the 11th century AD over the foundations of a gate from Roman times (probably from the 2nd century AD). Hisar Kapia is one of the three entrances (Eastern, Northern and Southern) to the acropolis of ancient Philippopolis. During the rule of the Ottoman Empire revival houses were embedded in the remains of the old stone walls around the gate.

=== Eastern gate of Philippopolis ===
The Eastern gate of Philippopolis is one of the three entrances of the ancient city that have been discovered in Plovdiv. The gate was built on the main road to Byzantium and the Bosphorus. Initially constructed in the 2nd century AD during the reign of Hadrian, the gate and the complex around it were completely rebuilt in the 4th century, and partially repaired in the 5th century. The gate had one wide central entrance and two narrower side entrances. Two watch towers were built on both sides of the gate for protection during attacks.

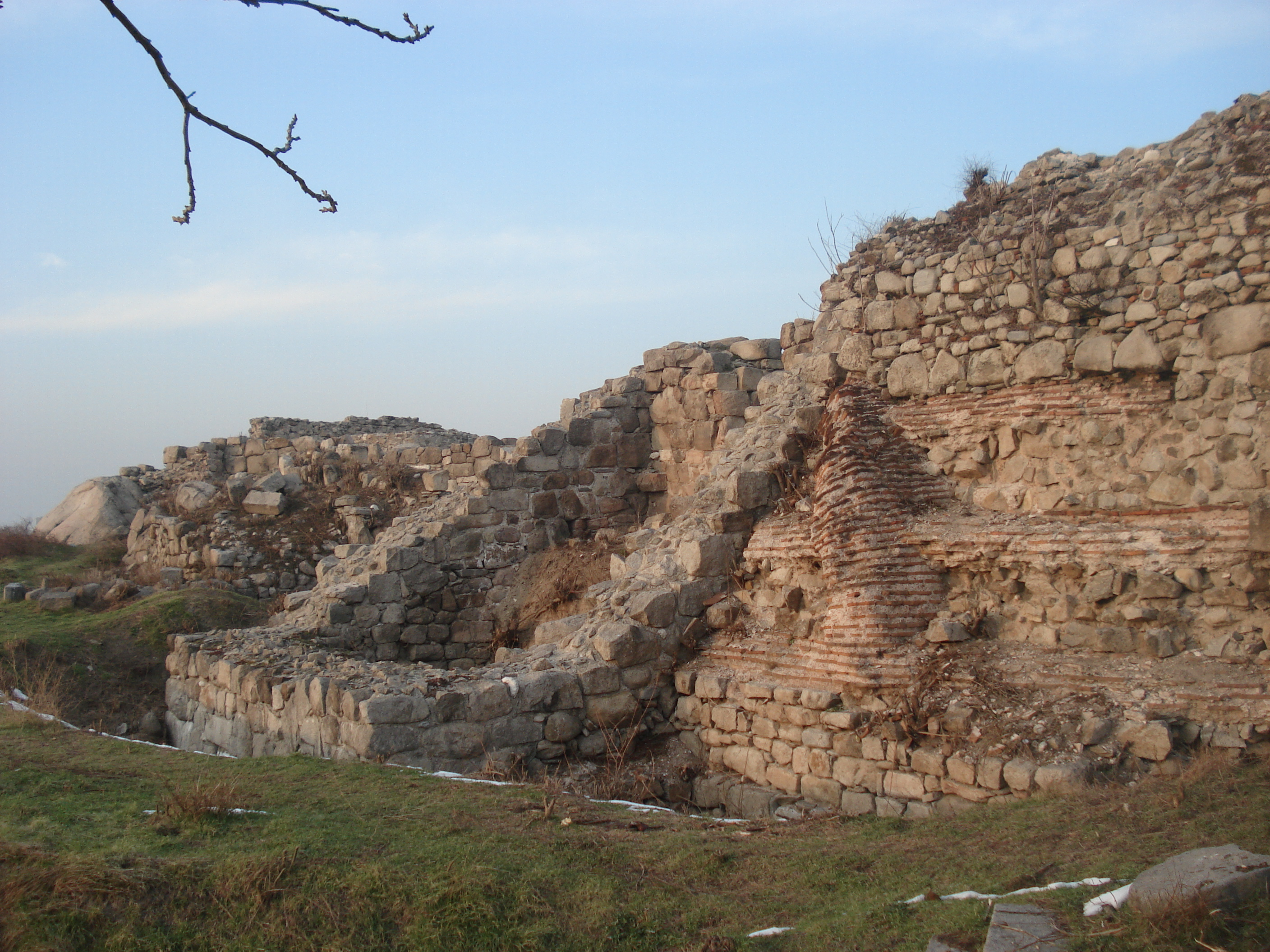
Stone walls on Nebet tepe

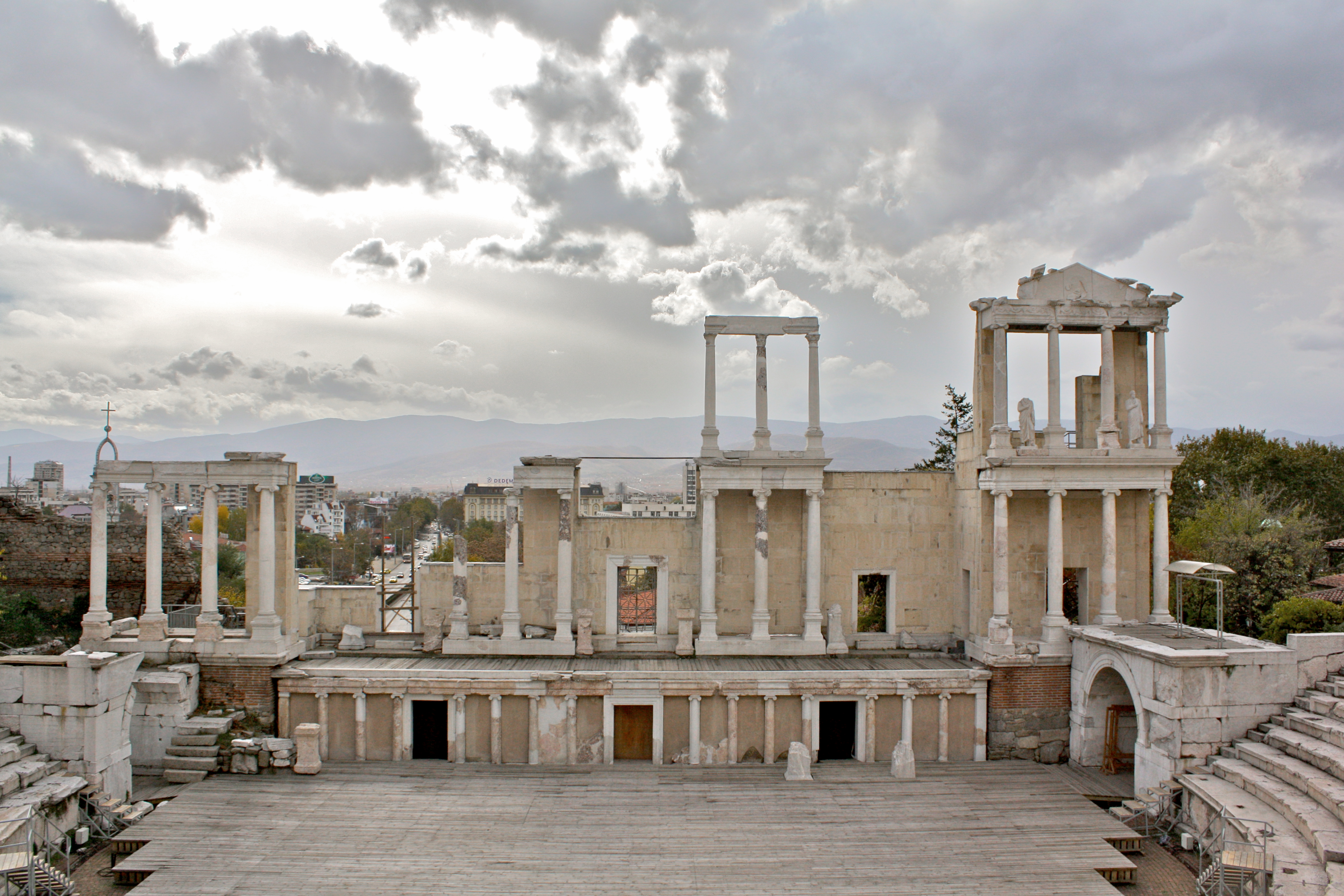
Ancient theatre

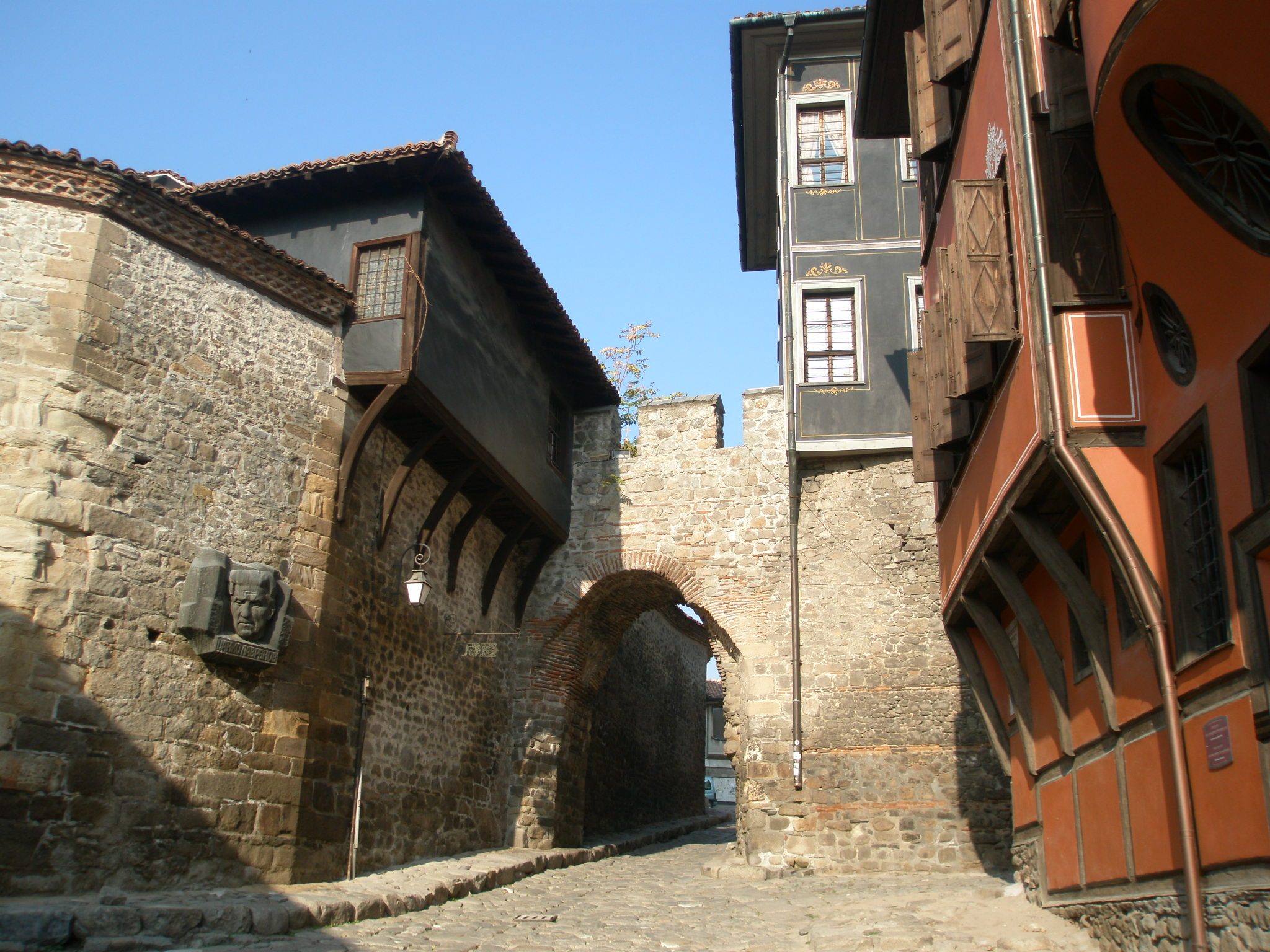
Hisar Kapia

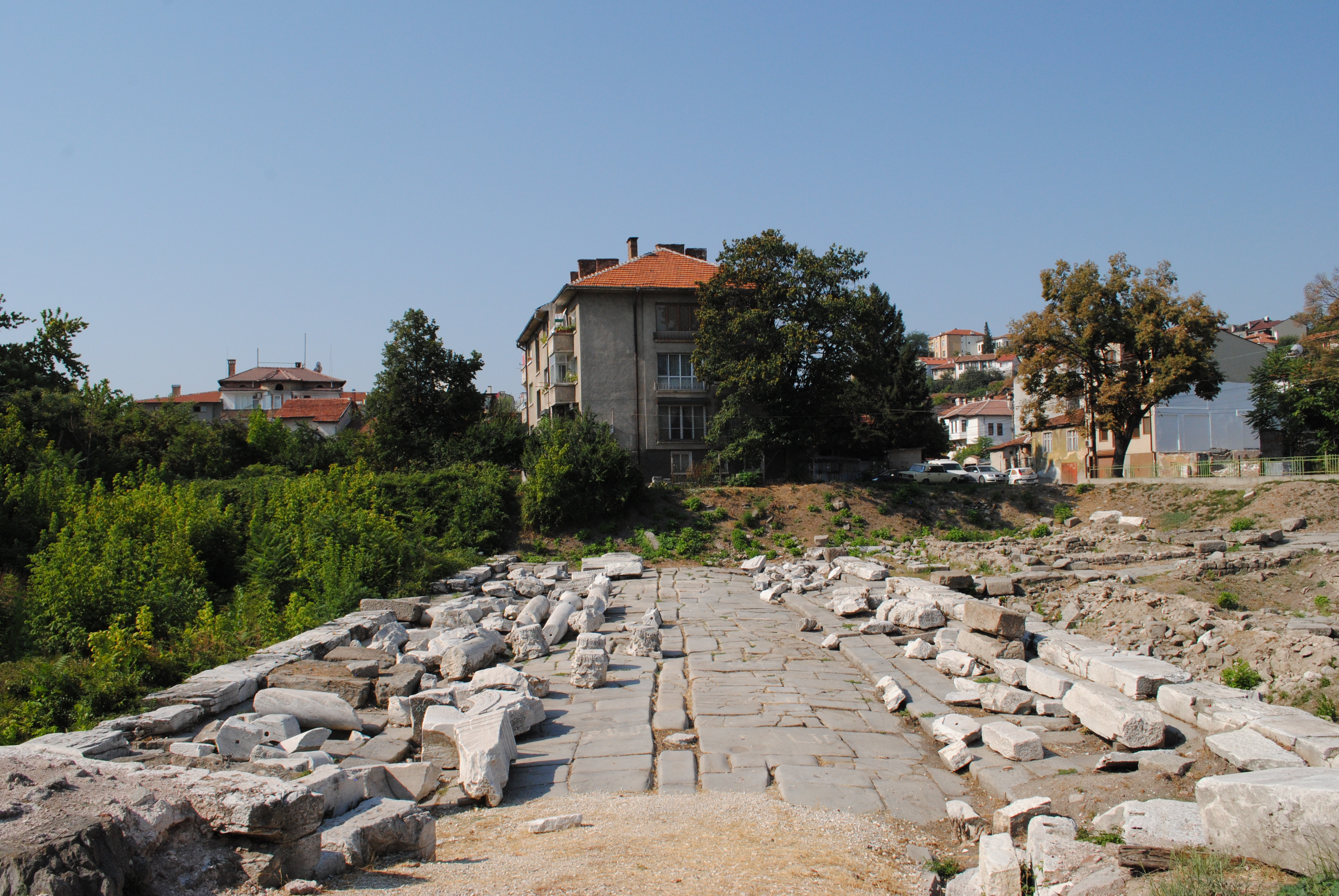
Eastern gate

== Revival architecture ==
Revival Houses in Plovdiv's old town

Plovdiv became an important economic center during the Revival period in Bulgaria.

=== Balabanov House ===
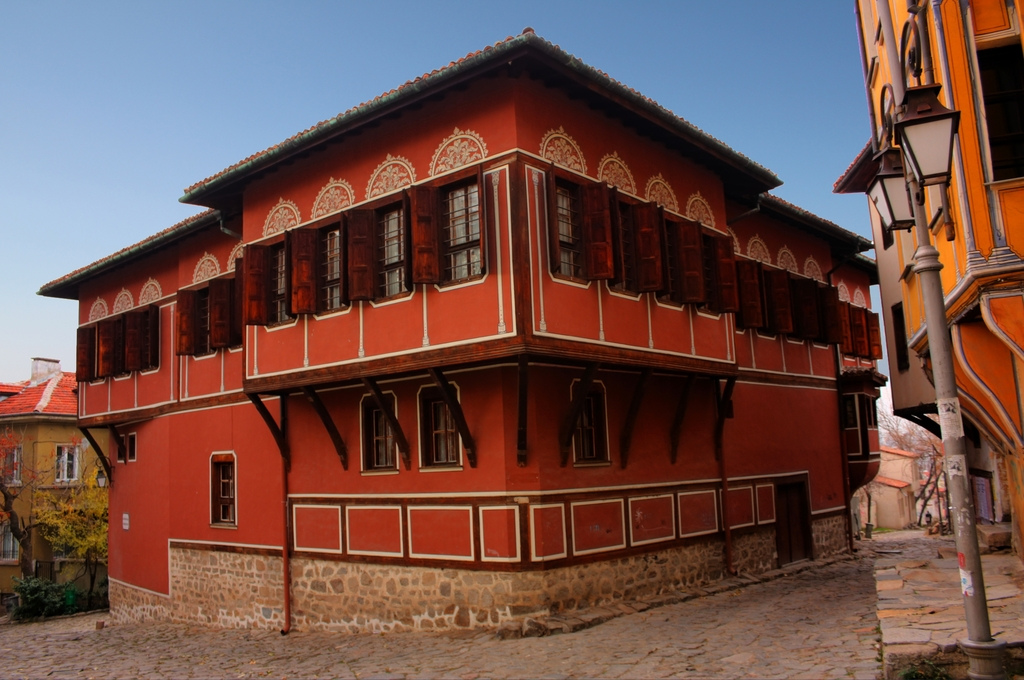
Balabanov House

Balabanov house is emblematic for the cultural life in Plovdiv. It hosts numerous events such as theatrical performances, concerts, exhibitions, literature readings. The house was built in the 19th century near St. Constantine and Elena square. The wide entrance door leads to a long, high-ceiling vestibule around which the residential and commercial premises are situated. An inner staircase leads to a large, glazed hall with richly ornamented carved-wood ceiling on the second floor. The hall is surrounded by four rooms decorated with restored antique furniture, fabrics and other items demonstrating the taste of the rich citizens of Plovdiv in the 19th century.

=== Danov House ===
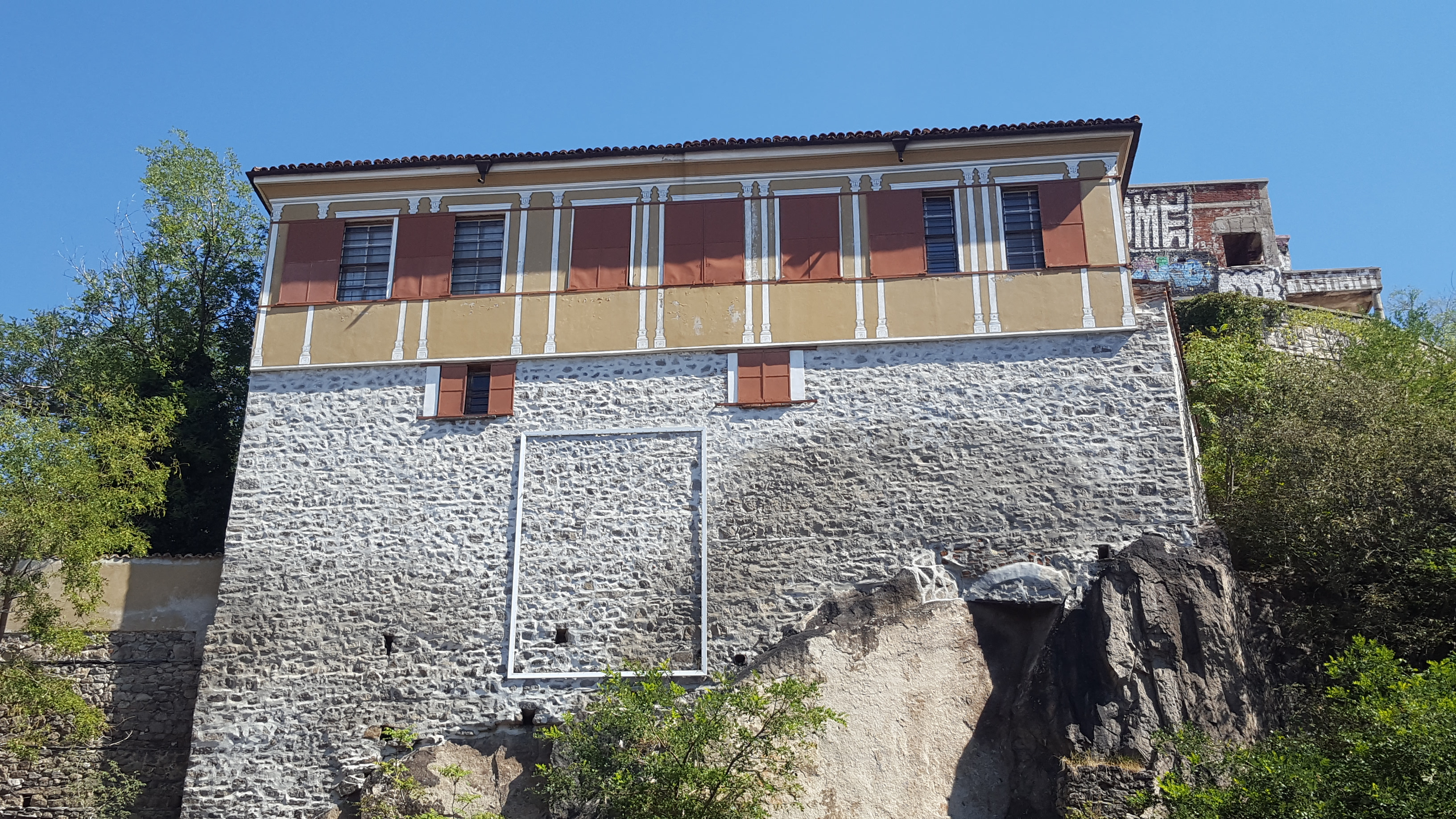
Danov House

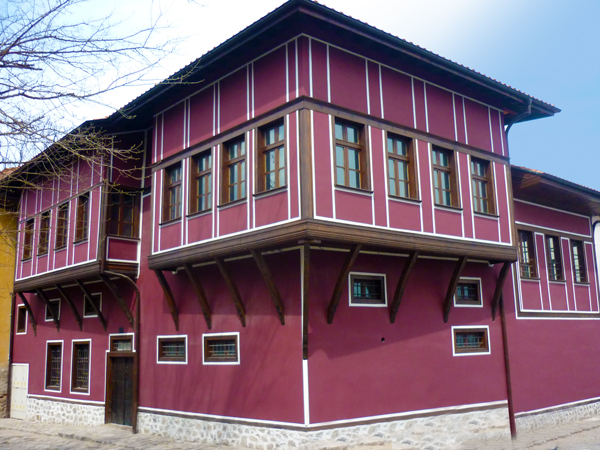
Klianti House

Danov house is built on the remains of the fortification walls of Philippopolis. The house is named after Hristo G. Danov - the father of organized book publishing in the Bulgaria, who lived in it. The decoration of the interior consists of floral murals, painted medallions, landscapes and portraits of philosophers from Ancient Greece. An authentic brick masonry oven is exhibited. The house hosts an exposition of Plovdiv's historical museum dedicated to book publishing in Bulgaria in the 19th and the 20th century.

=== Kuyumdzhioglu House ===
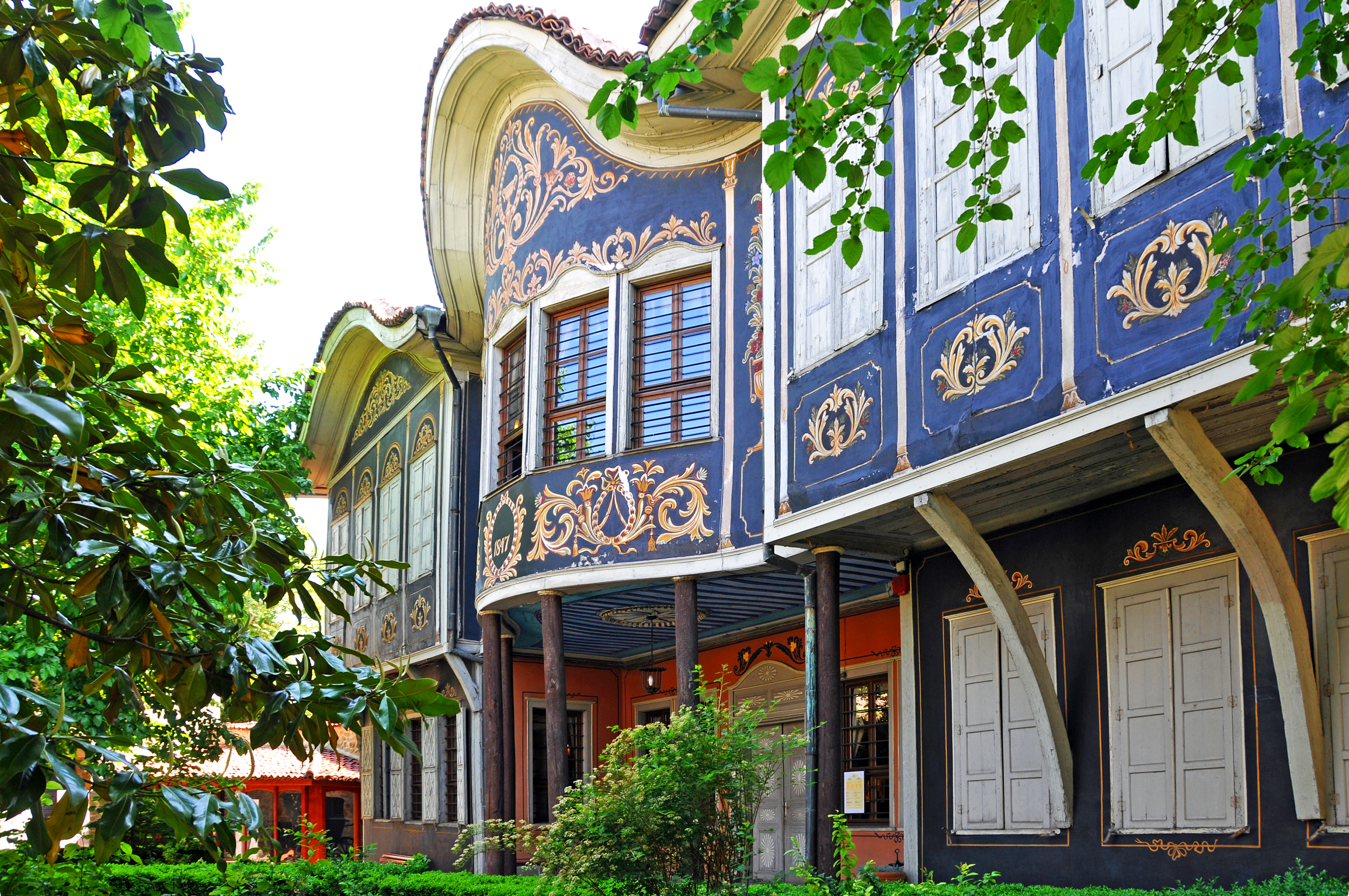
Kuyumdzhioglu House

The house of Argir Hristov Kuyumdzhioglu, a merchant from Plovdiv, was built in 1847. Kuyumdzhioglu was a prominent homespun trader who owned a company in Vienna. The house was constructed by Hadzhi Georgi, from the Rhodopean village of Kosovo, and has been described as a prime example of Plovdiv's mid-19th century Baroque architecture. The house has a symmetric facade; it is two stories tall on its west side and four stories tall on its east side, employing the natural denivelation. The Kuyumdzhioglu House spreads over 570 square metres (6,100 sq ft). It has 12 rooms and airy salons and 130 windows. Both the house's interior and exterior decoration rely on sophisticated floral motives. Each room has carved wood ceiling. The house has an inner yard with a garden, a marble fountain and a well. After the Liberation of Bulgaria from Ottoman rule in 1878, Argir Kuyumdzhioglu left Plovdiv to settle in Istanbul (Constantinople). From 1898 to 1902, the house was used as a girls' boarding house. Following that it was used by Garabet Karagyozyan's millinery factory, as a flour warehouse and as a vinegar factory. In 1930, it was acquired by Hamburg-based, Greek tobacco merchant, Antonio Colaro. Colaro intended to demolish the house and build a tobacco warehouse, but he was denied permission by the Plovdiv municipality. The municipality bought the house in 1938, carried out renovations, and organized the ethnographic museum.

=== Hindliyan House ===
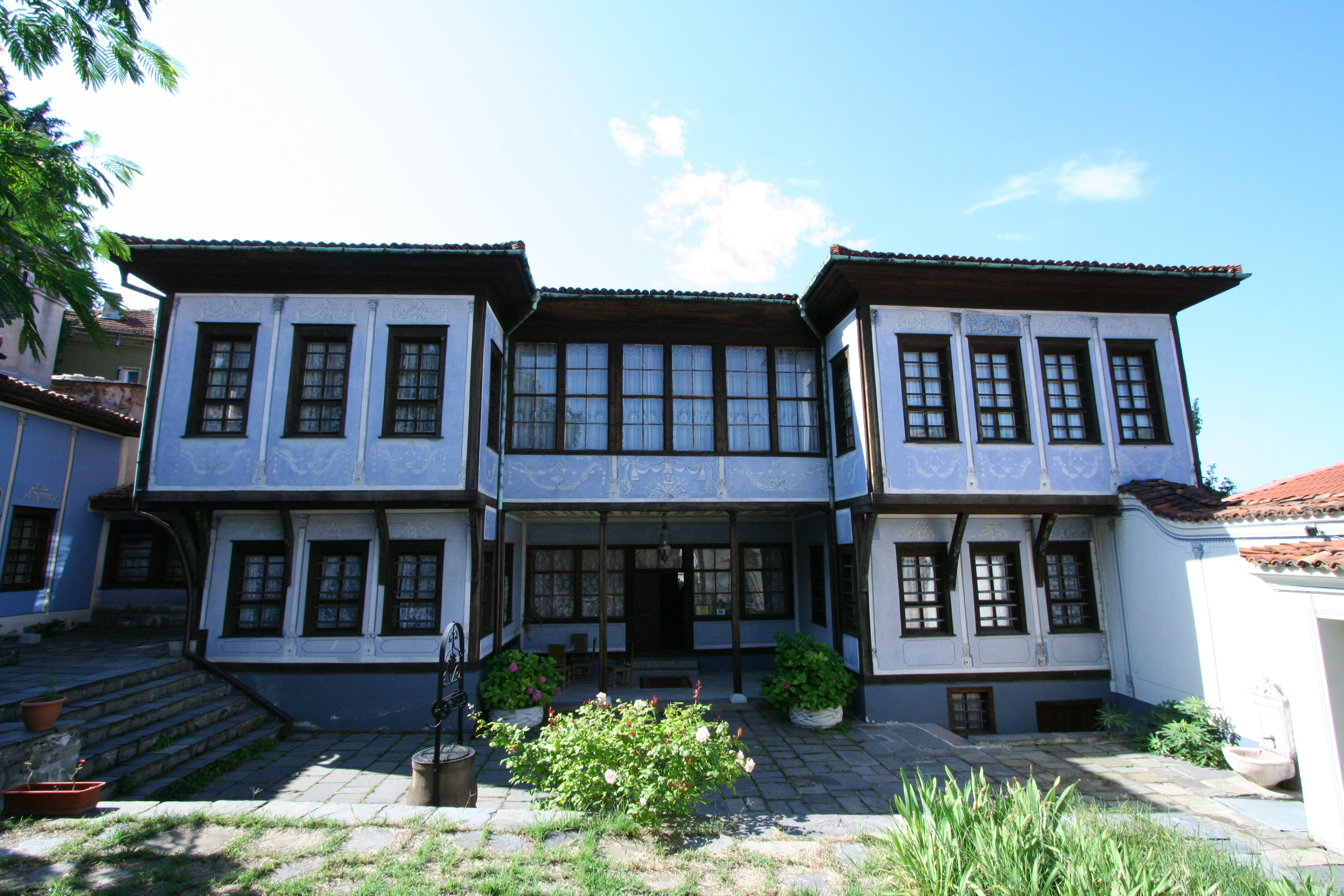
Hindliyan House

The house of the merchant and landowner Stephan Hindliyan was built in 1835. The house is connected to the adjacent Balabanov house making an impressive ensemble of renaissance houses. The forefront entrance is formed by an inward central portico. A rectangular hall is positioned at the center of the ground floor, surrounded by three large rooms. The inside and outside decoration of Hindliyan house is one of the most richly ornamented in Plovdiv's old town. The master-decorators Moko and Mavrudi from Chirpan worked more than six months on the painting of the walls with wall piers, garlands of floral and geometrical ornaments, vignettes, and landscape compositions from Tsargrad, Venice, Stockholm. The ceilings are painted in Orient patterns. The basement located in the North part of the building was used for valuables keeping. It has solid iron doors and thick window bars. The interior of Hindliyan house is decorated with authentic antique furniture.

=== Lamartine/Mavridi House ===
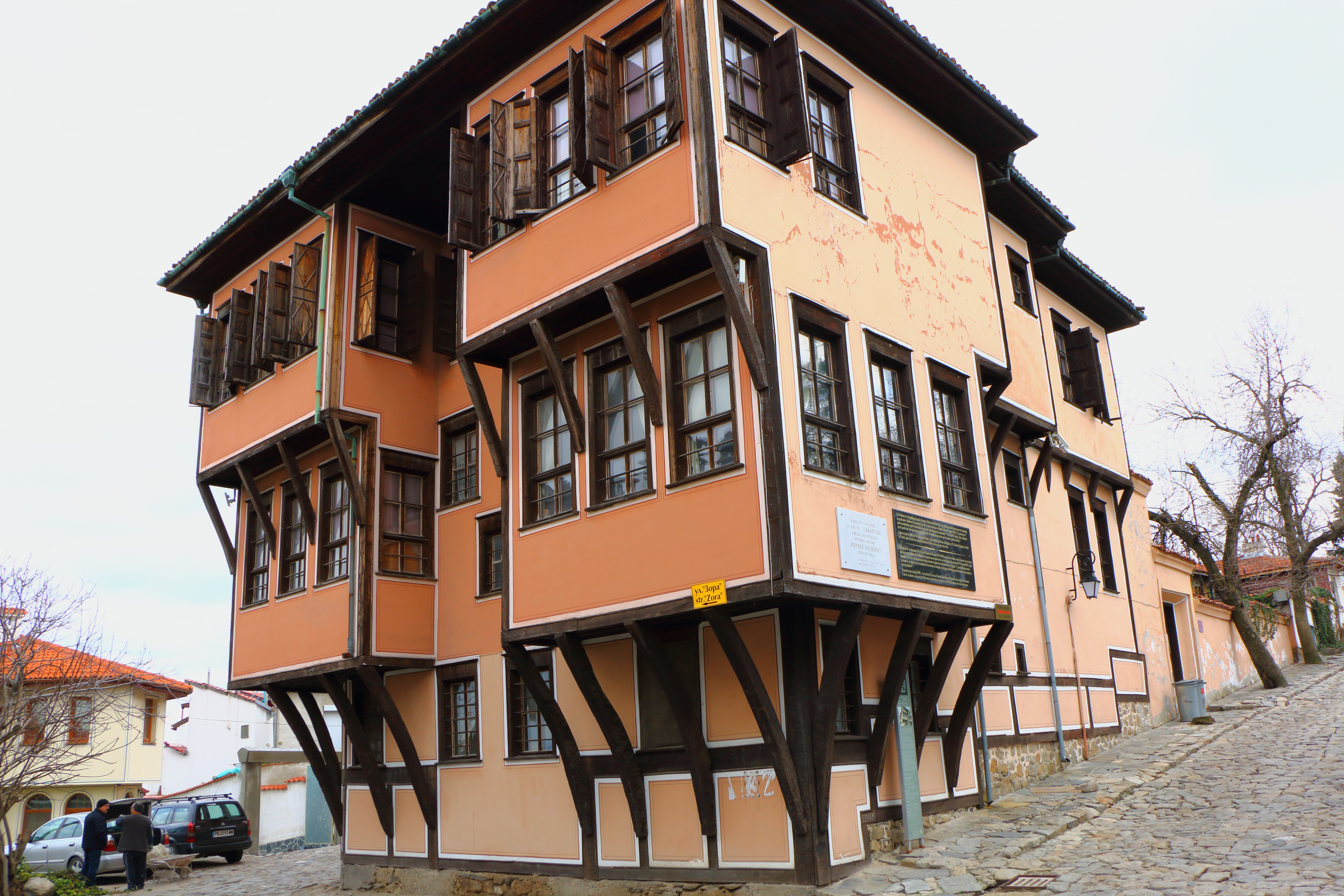
Lamartine/Mavridi House

The house of the merchant Georgi Mavridi was built in 1829–1830. It is one of the largest and most symmetrical buildings in Plovdiv's old town. The building is adapted to a very rough terrain which indicates the high quality of master builders' workmanship. The French poet Alphonse de Lamartine stayed in this house for three days in 1833 on his way back from a journey to the Middle East. Since then, the house is associated with his name. Currently, its hosts an exhibition dedicated to the life and work of the French poet and politician.
