= Boxborough Old Town Center =

- U.S. National Register of Historic Places
- U.S. Historic district
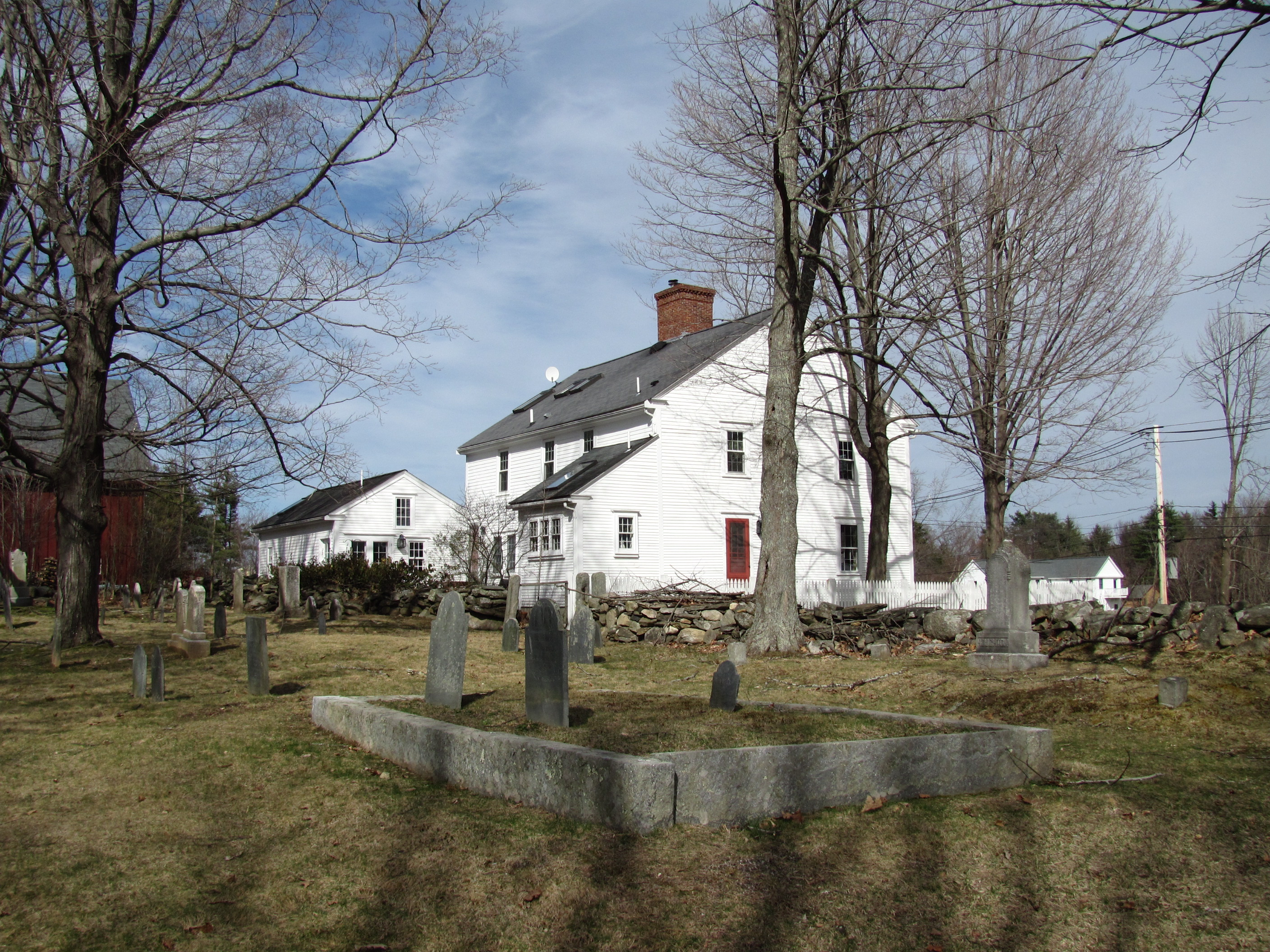
- North Cemetery and Reverend Joseph Willard House

- Location within Massachusetts Location within the United States
- Location: Boxborough, Massachusetts
- Coordinates: 42°29′46″N 71°31′37″W
- Area: 100 acres (40 ha)
- Built: 1783
- Architectural style: Colonial, Federal
- NRHP reference No.: 06001122
- Added to NRHP: December 12, 2006

Boxborough Old Town Center is a historic district encompassing the historic center of Boxborough, Massachusetts. It consists of a cluster of properties that lie primarily along Hill Road, extending from point a short way north of its junction with Schoolhouse Lane to a bend in road just south Middle Street. The 52 contributing properties range in date from the 1770s to the early 20th century, spanning much of the town's history. The town was bypassed by significant economic development in the 19th century, and has retained much of its rural charm, despite growing suburbanization in the second half of the 20th century. This particular area constituted the civic heart of the town until about 1900, when the current town hall was built in a more central location. It includes the town's oldest cemetery, adjacent to the site of its first meeting house. It also has one the town's five surviving one-room schoolhouses, including a privy which was used into the mid-20th century. The district was listed on the National Register of Historic Places in 2006.

== See also ==
- National Register of Historic Places listings in Middlesex County, Massachusetts
