= Old Town Township, Forsyth County, North Carolina =

Township in Forsyth County, North Carolina

Coordinates: 36°10′30″N 80°20′14″W

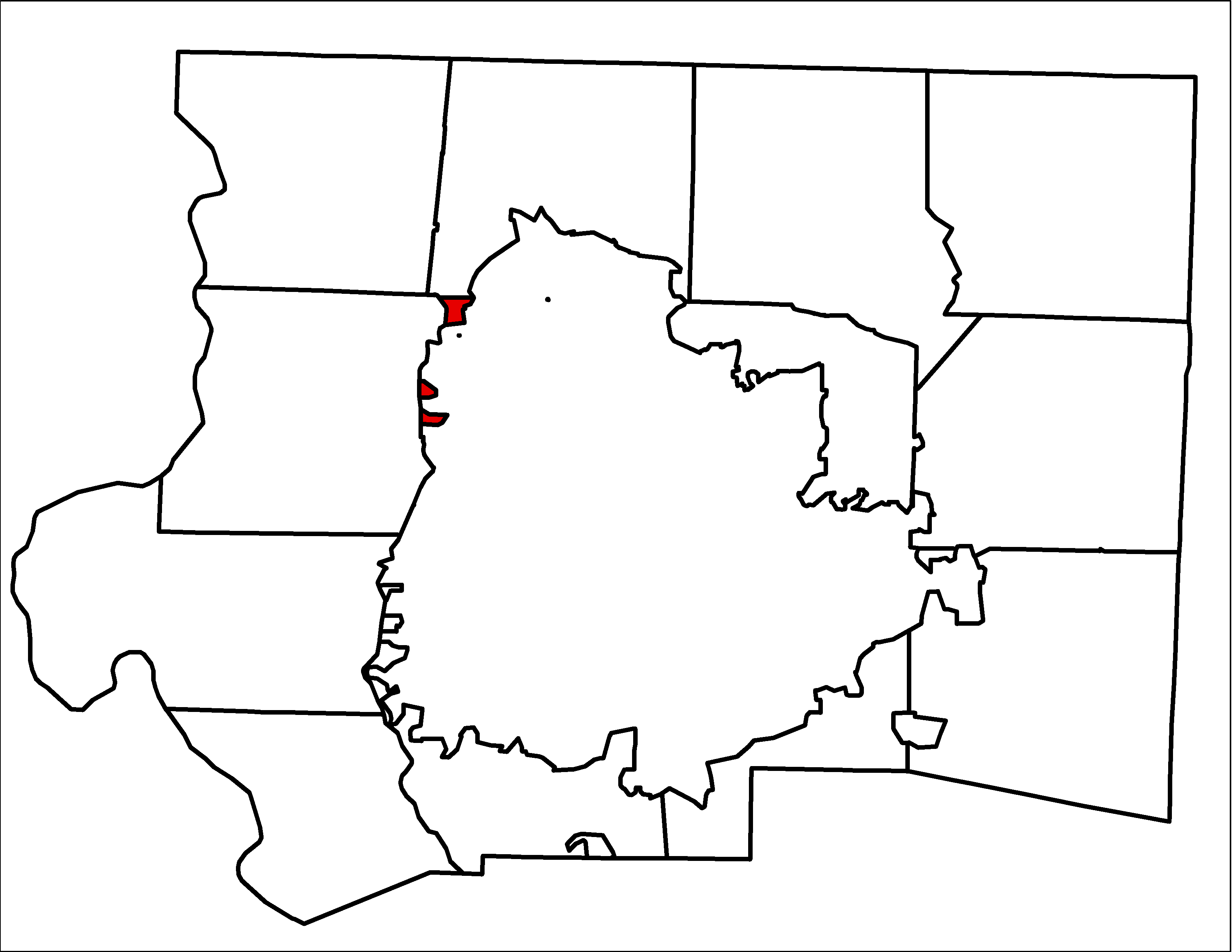
Location of Old Town Township in Forsyth County, N.C.

Old Town Township is one of fifteen townships in Forsyth County, North Carolina, United States. The township had a population of 149 according to the 2010 census.

Geographically, Old Town Township occupies 0.53 square miles (1.4 km^{2}) in central Forsyth County. Parts of the town of Bethania are located here, but nearly all of the original township has been annexed by the City of Winston-Salem and made part of Winston Township, including the original community of Old Town.

Historical population
Census	Pop.	Note	%±
2000	176		—
2010	149		−15.3%
