= Ledenhof =

Coordinates: 52.2724°N 8.0451°E

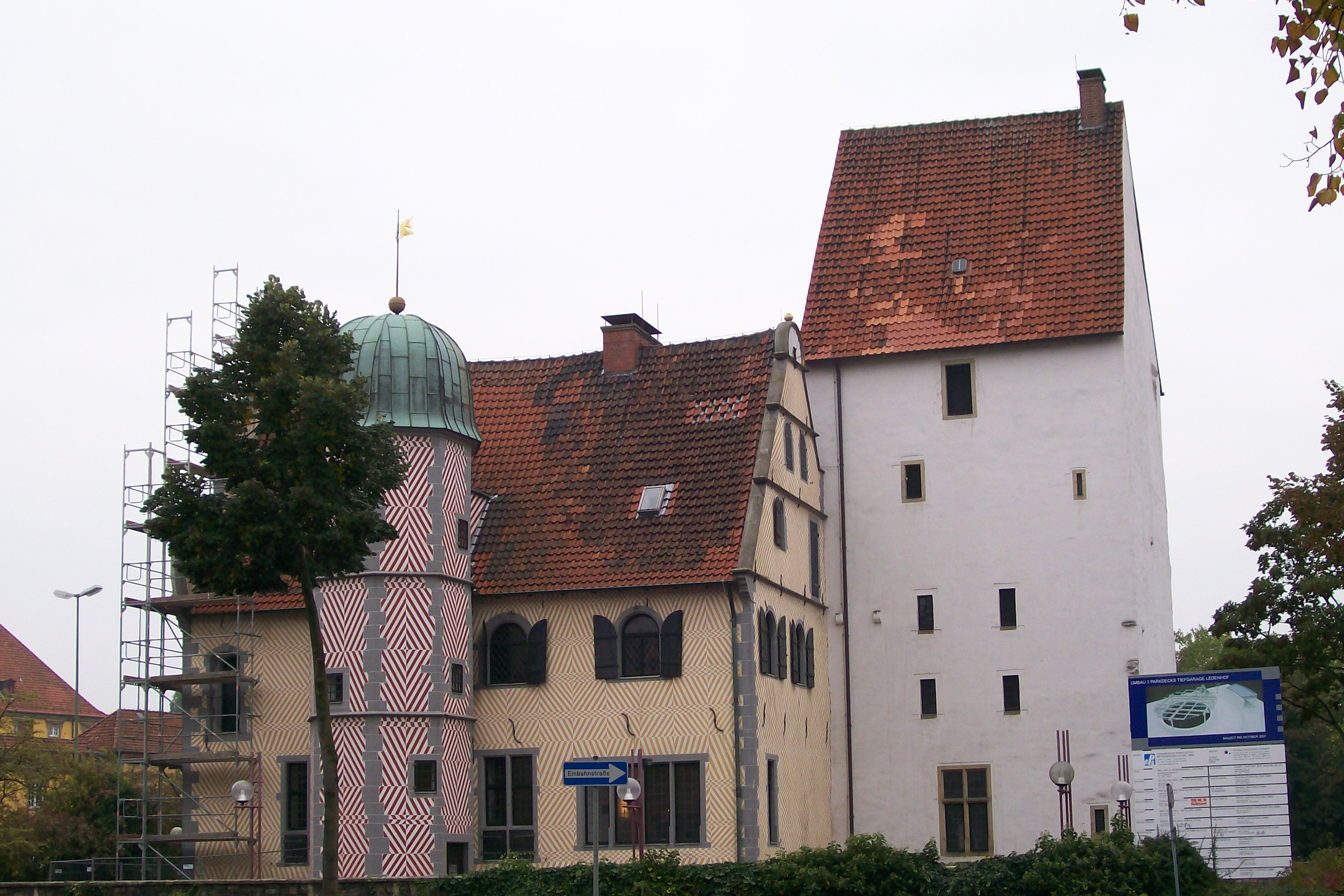
The Ledenhof with stone-structure building (right), great hall (centre), and stair tower (on left) (pictured in 2007)

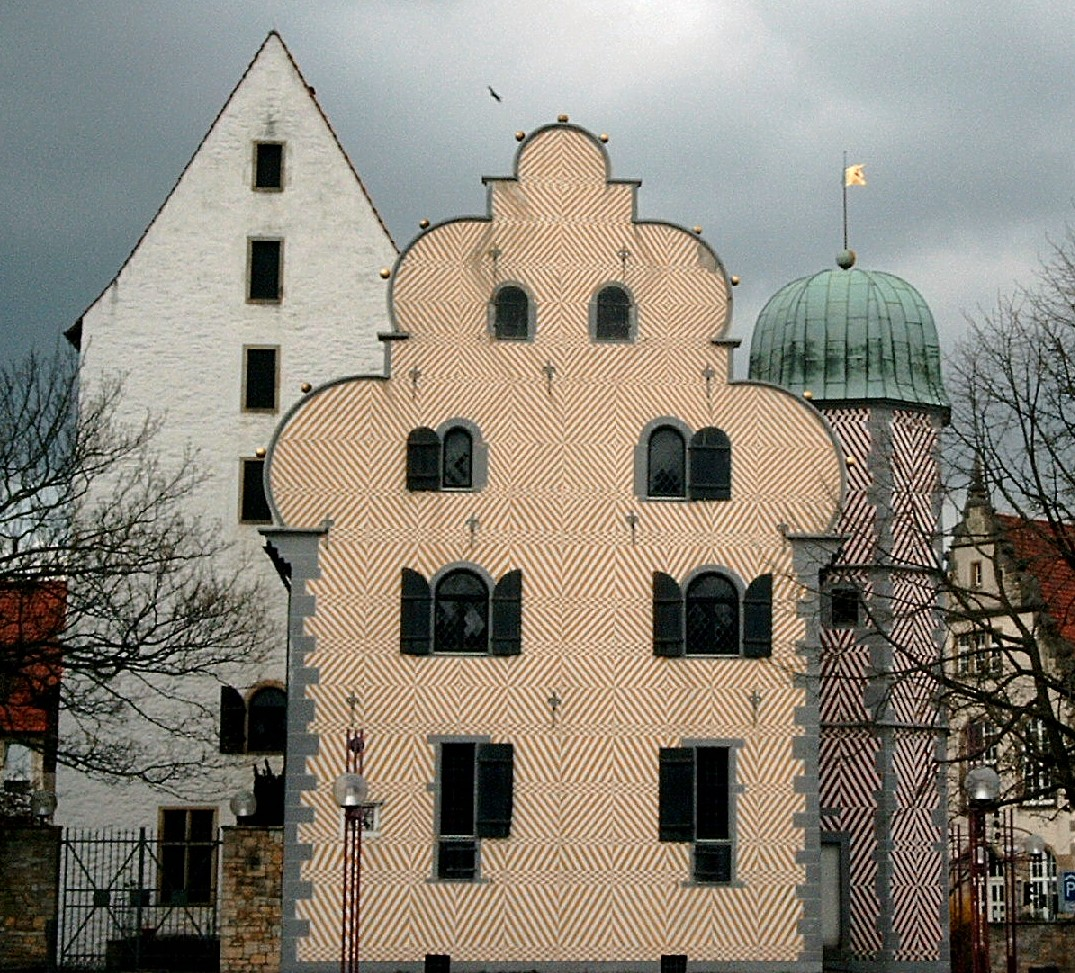
The Ledenhof, with all three structures in reverse order

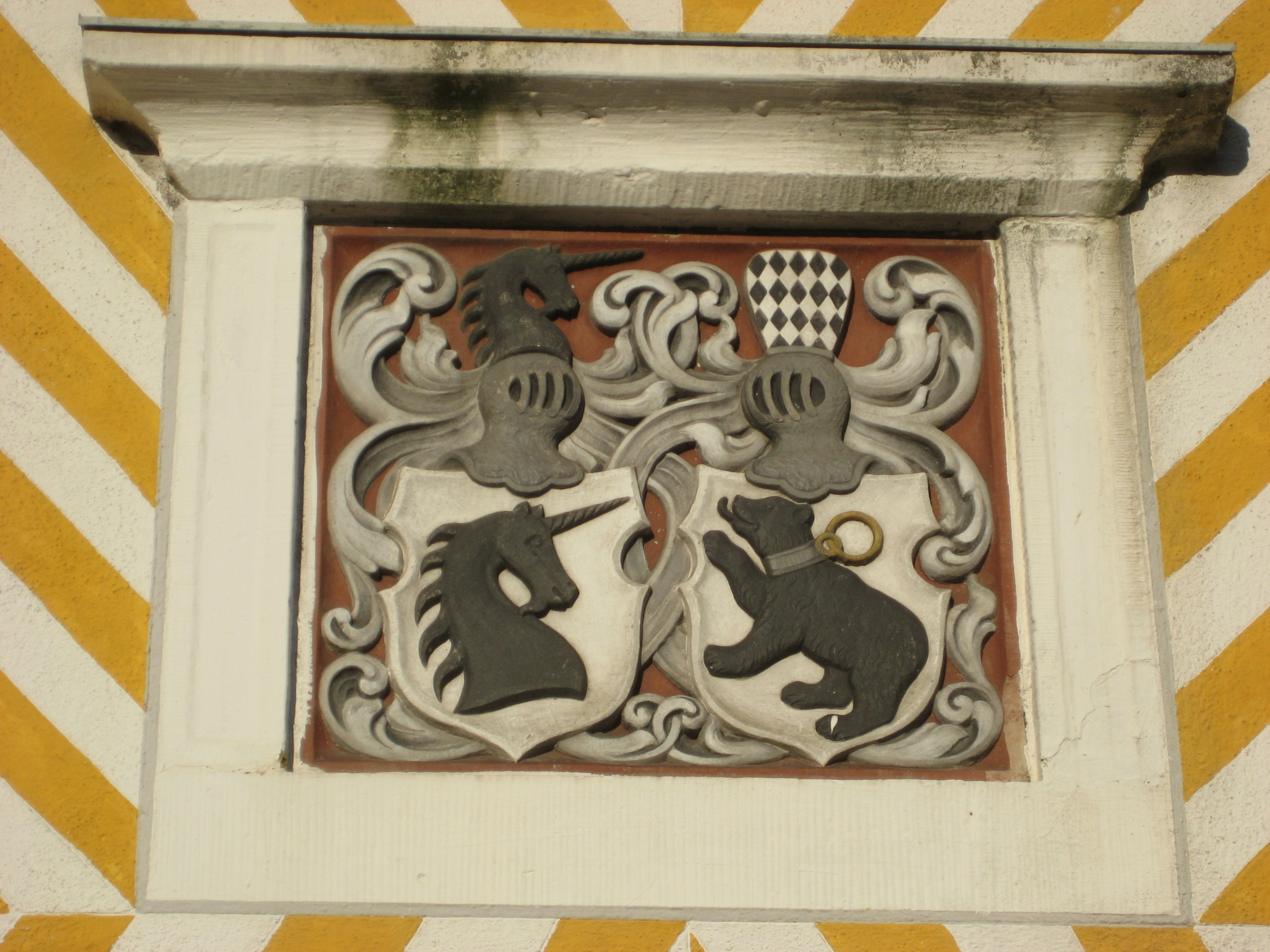
Crests of the von Leden and von Bar families on the great hall building

The Ledenhof (formerly known also as the Alte Münze) is a historic building in the city of Osnabrück, Lower Saxony, Germany. During the medieval period it was the city residence of the noble von Leden family. Having initially been an extensive courtly building complex, today only the seven-storey Steinwerk (stone structure) building and the great hall with stair tower remain. Since 2002 the Ledenhof has been the main office of the Deutsche Stiftung Friedensforschung (German Foundation for Peace Research).

== History ==
The Ledenhof, located close to the Baroque Schloss Osnabrück (Osnabrück Castle) and the late Gothic Katharinenkirche (St. Catherine's Church), was first mentioned in records in 1499. The wine merchant Johann Leden had established himself on the fringes of the Osnabrück Altstadt (old town) during the mid-14th century, where he had built a half-timbered residential house and a wine store. The third Heinrich von Leden, who in 1499 had been given extensive privileges by then-German King and later Holy Roman Emperor Maximilian I, built a great hall on the rests of this house.

The Ledenhof remained an enclosed area through to the late 18th century; the “Du Plat’sche Karte” map from 1787 displays it as a rectangular courtyard with a gatehouse. It is likely that the Ledenhof was once the location of a mint. The building complex was referred to as the “Alte Münze” up to the early 20th century; it was only after 1930, when Rudolf vom Bruch published “Die Rittersitze im Fürstentum Osnabrück” (Manor Houses of the Principality of Osnabrück”), when the name “Ledenhof” came back into fashion. During the 19th century the ownership of the Ledenhof changed multiple times. Parts of the premises belonged to manufacturer Heinrich Wilhelm Storck, others remained the property of the counts of Münster until 1781. In the late 19th century, Friedrich August Koch and Ernst Conrad Kromschröder used the Ledenhof for business purposes.

Since 1930 the Ledenhof has belonged to Osnabrück City Council. Throughout World War II and its aftermath, the remaining buildings of the Ledenhof were under serious threat of collapsing. Between 1964 and 1976 the stone structure and great hall underwent extensive renovation. In 1980 Osnabrück City Council received the Europa Nostra Award for its exemplary restoration of the Ledenhof. Before it became the head office of the Deutsche Stiftung Friedensforschung in 2002, the Musikbibliothek (music library) was located here.

== Sections ==
=== Stone structure ===
The most prominent of the Ledenhof's buildings is the Steinwerk made from quarried stone and featuring a saddle roof. It is one of Osnabrück's most distinctive medieval buildings. The Steinwerk dates from the 14th century and has exterior dimensions of 9.15 by 9.13 m. Unlike other Steinwerk buildings it did not function as a castle tower as the construction style seems to suggest, rather as a warehouse. The entrance to the cellar – vaulted unlike usual castle towers – is situated at ground level and was therefore easier to access than the castle tower with its higher lying entrance, which was easier to defend. Originally the Steinwerk did not have a chimney. In the 15th century the Steinwerk became a keep with seven floors and hatchways on the south side. The third Heinrich von Leden, who had the great hall built, created an entry point between the two buildings and also had a lavatory added.

=== Great hall ===
The great hall with two pediments was built in the 15th century by Heinrich von Leden – the third consecutive bearer of this name – as a prestigious residence. The ground floor consists of a four-metre high hallway whose other dimensions are 9.64 by 8.18 m; this used to serve as a combined kitchen and living room and had a parlour situated at the back measuring 3.84 by 8.18 m, which can be accessed by two doors next to the fireplace. The parlour was presumably the bedroom of Heinrich von Leden and his wife Margarete von Bar. A flight of stairs – replaced in the late 16th century with a polygonal spiral staircase tower made from oak – led to the upper floor, which includes a ballroom. This features much valuable ornamentation upon its beamed ceiling and used to be attached to a gallery room on its east side. This was removed when the stair tower was added. There was also an entrance to the Steinwerk building on this floor. The great hall was furnished with decorative paintings from diamond-shaped bands on plaster in white and gold; these were restored during the renovation works.

== Other information ==
During the time the building complex was referred to as the “Alte Münze”, the name “Ledenhof” was used to denote the area on which the Marienstätte monastery had once stood. The name “Ledenhof” is also used to refer to an underground garage right next to the Ledenhof itself. There is a street around the area of the Ledenhof which today bears the name “Alte Münze”.

== Literature ==
- Poppe, R., “Der Ledenhof in Osnabrück, Heimatkunde des Osnabrücker Landes” in Einzelbeispielen Heft 3, H. Th. Wenner (Osnabrück, 1978) (ISBN 3-87898-127-9)
- vom Bruch, R., Die Rittersitze im Fürstentum Osnabrück, H. Th. Wenner (Osnabrück, 2004 – first published 1930) (ISBN 3-87898-384-0)

== Links ==
- Photos of the Ledenhof at osnabrueck.de
