= Torrance Promenade =

- Location: Torrance, California, United States
- Coordinates: 33°51′11″N 118°21′8″W
- Address: 20038 Hawthorne Boulevard
- Opened: 1972; 54 years ago
- Previous names: Old Towne
- Developer: Lincoln Realty Old Town
- Manager: Kimco Realty
- Owner: Kimco Realty
- Architect: Jenkins & Greist
- Num. of stores: 140+ (Old Towne); 50+ (Promenade)
- Num. of anchor tenants: 10
- Floor area: 314,804 square feet (29,246.2 m^{2}) (Old Towne); 270,749 square feet (25,153.4 m^{2}) (Torrance Promenade)

Torrance Promenade, formerly Old Towne, is a shopping mall in Torrance, California, United States. The original Old Towne mall built in 1972 featured a mix of shopping, amusement and entertainment. The property was converted to a strip mall in 1989 and renamed Torrance Promenade.

== History ==
The mall was built in 1972 by Lincoln Realty Old Town, a partnership of Mik Brindle, Clifford A. Hemmerling, and Southern California Financial Corp. Jenkins & Greist were the mall's architects. Old Towne was built with space for up to 140 tenants along a brick-lined central concourse, with Kmart as the sole anchor store. Features of the mall included an antique carousel, two dark rides, a movie theater, a gazebo for live performances, and balconies from which entertainers such as jazz bands and barbershop quartets could perform. One section of the mall was called "Artisan's Way", and was dedicated to crafters, silversmiths, and glass blowers.

The mall could not effectively compete with nearby Del Amo Fashion Center and the South Bay Galleria. By 1982, the owners remodeled the mall for $3.8 million remodel and added two big box anchors, Marshalls and Dayton Hudson’s then-new clothing store Plums, which opened in September 1983. The name was changed to Old Town Place. The Federated Group electronics store closed in 1989; the electronics and appliance store Silo replaced it but went out of business in 1995.

== Conversion to power center ==
By 1989 the 314,804-square-foot (29,246.2 m^{2}) mall was roughly a third vacant and the city approved its conversion to an outdoor power center format by its then-owners, BPT Torrance Associates. Only the carousel remained from the earlier attractions after the 1990 remodel. In 1994, the carousel was moved to the Eastwood Mall in Niles, Ohio. The center was renamed first Torrance Citiplex, then Torrance Promenade. Trader Joe’s was added in November 2002.

As of 2020, Torrance Promenade is owned by Kimco Realty, featuring Walmart Neighborhood Market (formerly Kmart), Ashley HomeStore (formerly Kmart and Orchard Supply Hardware), HomeGoods (formerly Kmart), Ross Dress for Less, Burlington (formerly Levitz Furniture and Sears Outlet), UFC Gym (formerly Linens N Things), Boot Barn (formerly Silo Electronics and Office Depot), Bob's Discount Furniture (formerly Sam Ash Music), and Marshalls among its tenants.
