= Old Town, California =

Old Town, California may refer to:

- Old Town, Kern County, California
- Old Town, Marin County, California
- Old Town, Santa Barbara County, California
- Old Town, Ventura County, California
- Old Town, California, former name of Pine Town, California, in Lassen County

== See also ==
- Old Town Eureka
- Old Town Pasadena
- Old Sacramento State Historic Park
- Old Town San Diego State Historic Park
