= Old Town, British Columbia =

Old Town
- Location of Old Town in British Columbia
- Coordinates: 49°33′00″N 115°58′00″W
- Country: Canada
- Province: British Columbia

Old Town is a ghost town of British Columbia, located in a region called the East Kootenay, on the south side of Perry Creek, northwest of Cranbrook. The town contained dance halls, several saloons, hotels, three stores and a jail. The town was created around 1867 and lasted about ten years. Old Town supported the miners who worked placer claims on Perry Creek. When the gold on Perry Creek dwindled, Old Town disappeared. In 1973 only one building remained on the Old Town site.
