= Staré Město (Svitavy District) =

- Municipality
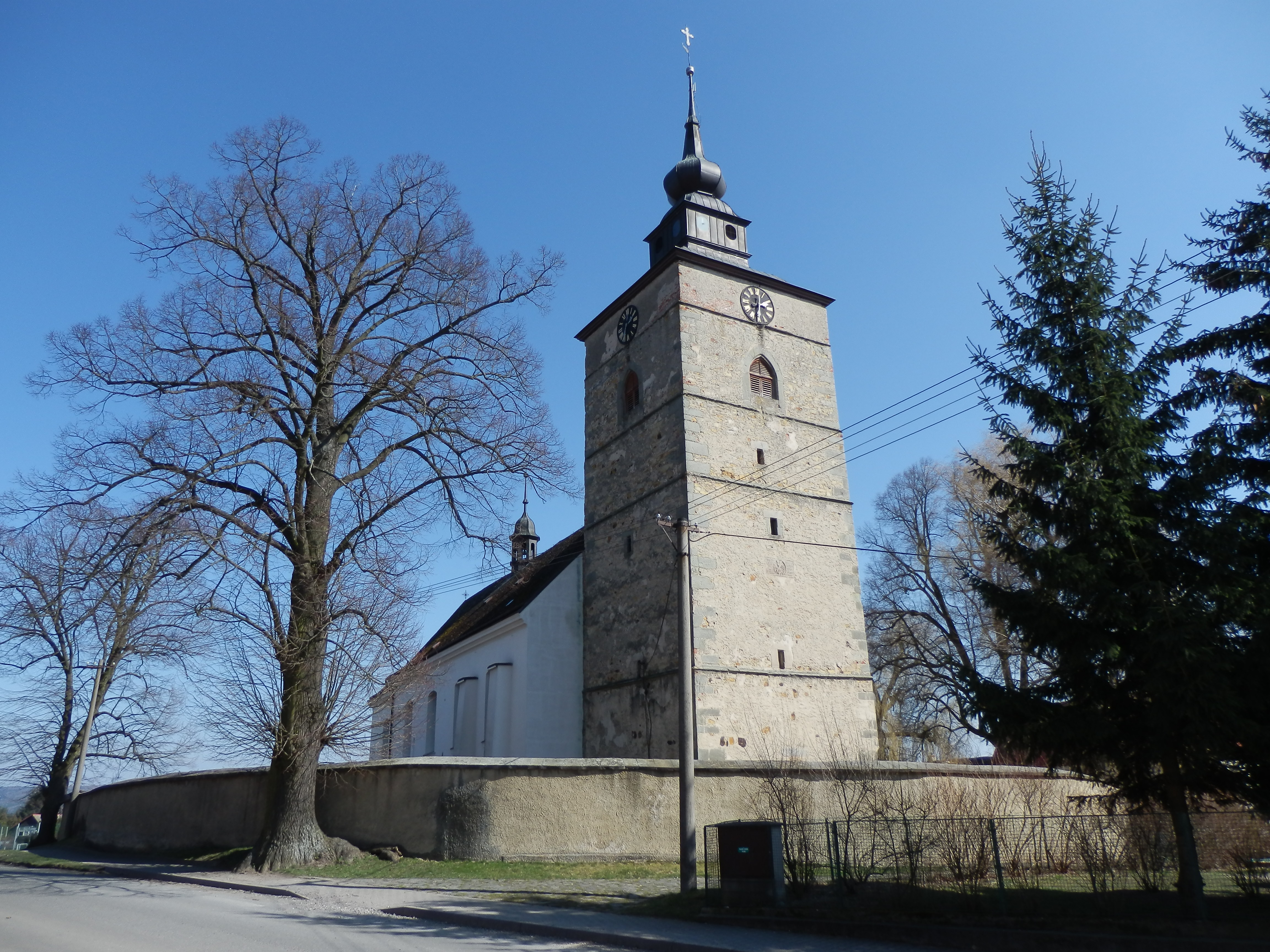
- Church of Saint Catherine

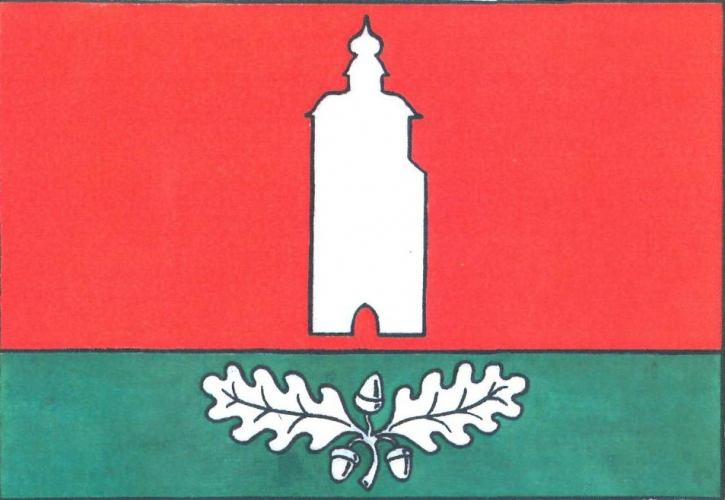
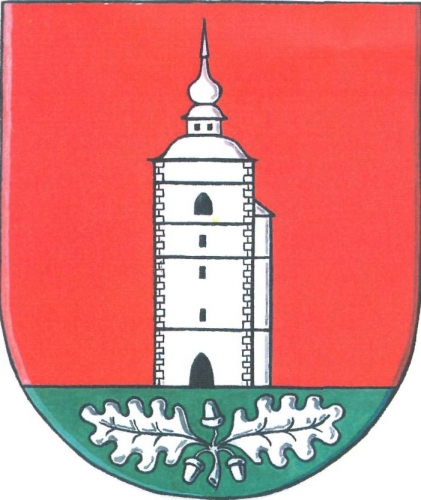
- Flag Coat of arms

- Location in the Czech Republic
- Coordinates: 49°47′38″N 16°40′30″E
- Country: Czech Republic
- Region: Pardubice
- District: Svitavy
- First mentioned: 1270

Area
  - Total: 24.75 km^{2} (9.56 sq mi)
- Elevation: 418 m (1,371 ft)

Population (2026-01-01)
  - Total: 1,031
  - Density: 41.66/km^{2} (107.9/sq mi)
- Time zone: UTC+1 (CET)
  - Summer (DST): UTC+2 (CEST)
- Postal codes: 569 32, 571 01
- Website: www.stare-mesto.eu

Staré Město is a municipality and village in Svitavy District in the Pardubice Region of the Czech Republic. It has about 1,000 inhabitants.

Staré Město lies approximately 17 kilometres (11 mi) east of Svitavy, 71 km (44 mi) south-east of Pardubice, and 166 km (103 mi) east of Prague.

== Administrative division ==
Staré Město consists of four municipal parts (in brackets population according to the 2021 census):

- Staré Město (793)
- Bílá Studně (28)
- Petrušov (31)
- Radišov (120)

== Demographics ==
Historical population
Year	Pop.	±%
1869	1,821	—
1880	1,762	−3.2%
1890	1,795	+1.9%
1900	1,725	−3.9%
1910	1,658	−3.9%
1921	1,650	−0.5%
1930	1,676	+1.6%
1950	1,022	−39.0%
1961	1,120	+9.6%
1970	967	−13.7%
1980	1,056	+9.2%
1991	1,003	−5.0%
2001	985	−1.8%
2011	984	−0.1%
2021	972	−1.2%
Source: Censuses
