= Old Town Residential Historic District (Las Vegas, New Mexico) =

Historic district in New Mexico, United States

- U.S. National Register of Historic Places
- U.S. Historic district
- NM State Register of Cultural Properties
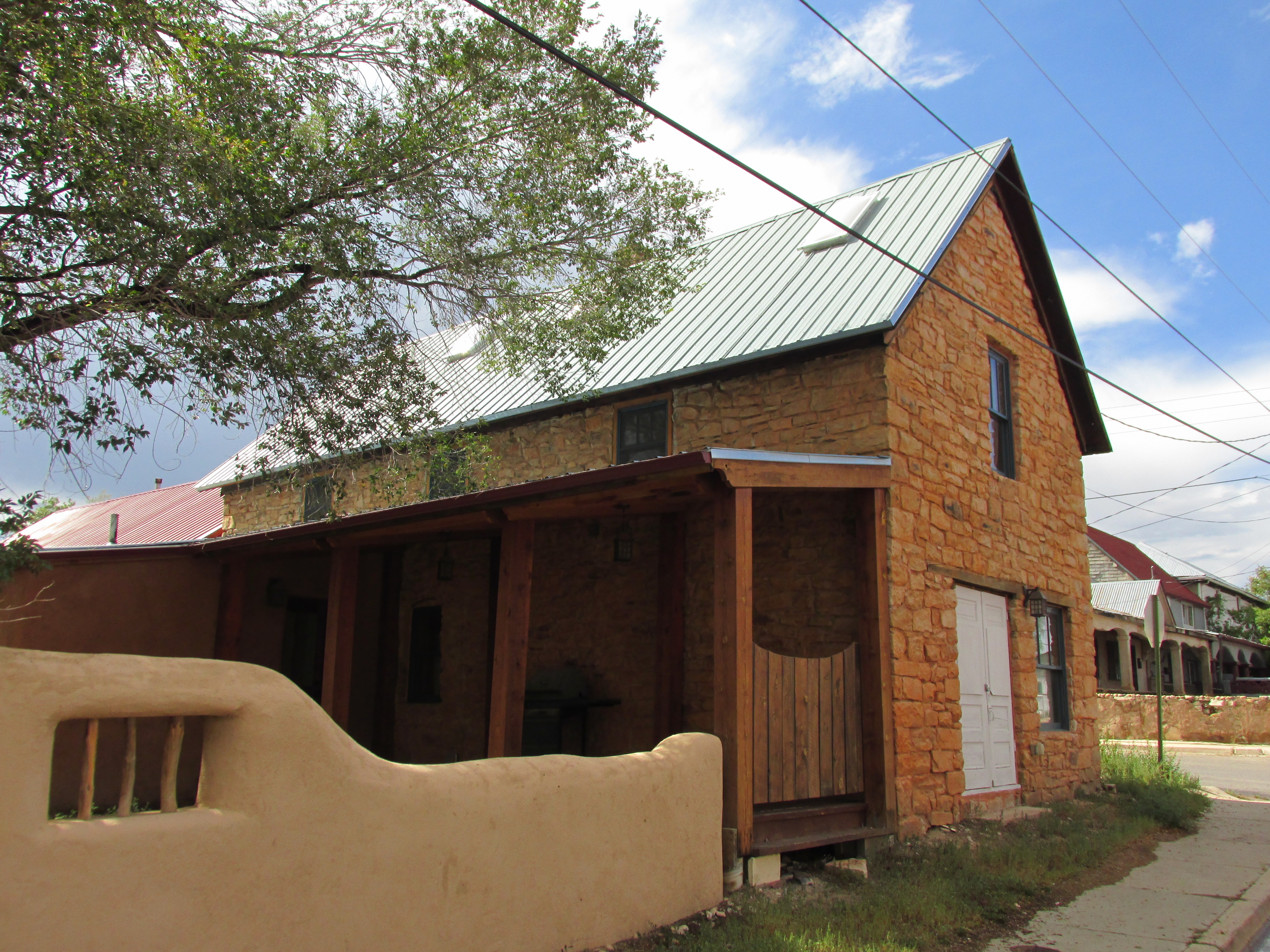
- Corner of Chavez Street and Valley Street

- Location within New Mexico Location within the United States
- Location: Roughly bounded by Perey St. to Mills Ave. and from New Mexico to Gonzales St., Las Vegas, New Mexico
- Coordinates: 35°35′31″N 105°13′42″W
- Area: 94 acres (38 ha)
- Built: 1942
- Architect: Multiple
- Architectural style: Queen Anne, Mission/Spanish Revival, New Mexico Vernacular
- MPS: Las Vegas New Mexico MRA (AD)
- NRHP reference No.: 83004161
- NMSRCP No.: 895

Significant dates
- Added to NRHP: October 28, 1983
- Designated NMSRCP: December 1, 1982

Old Town Residential Historic District is a historic district dating back to 1840. It was listed on the National Register of Historic Places in 1983.

The district plus the previously NRHP-listed Distrito de las Escuelas comprises the majority of the historic residential architecture of West Las Vegas, mostly adobe structures. Las Vegas was established in 1835 as a land grant from the Mexican government to a group of twenty-nine families.

== See also ==
- National Register of Historic Places listings in San Miguel County, New Mexico
