= Old town Osnabrück =

Area of Osnabrück, Germany

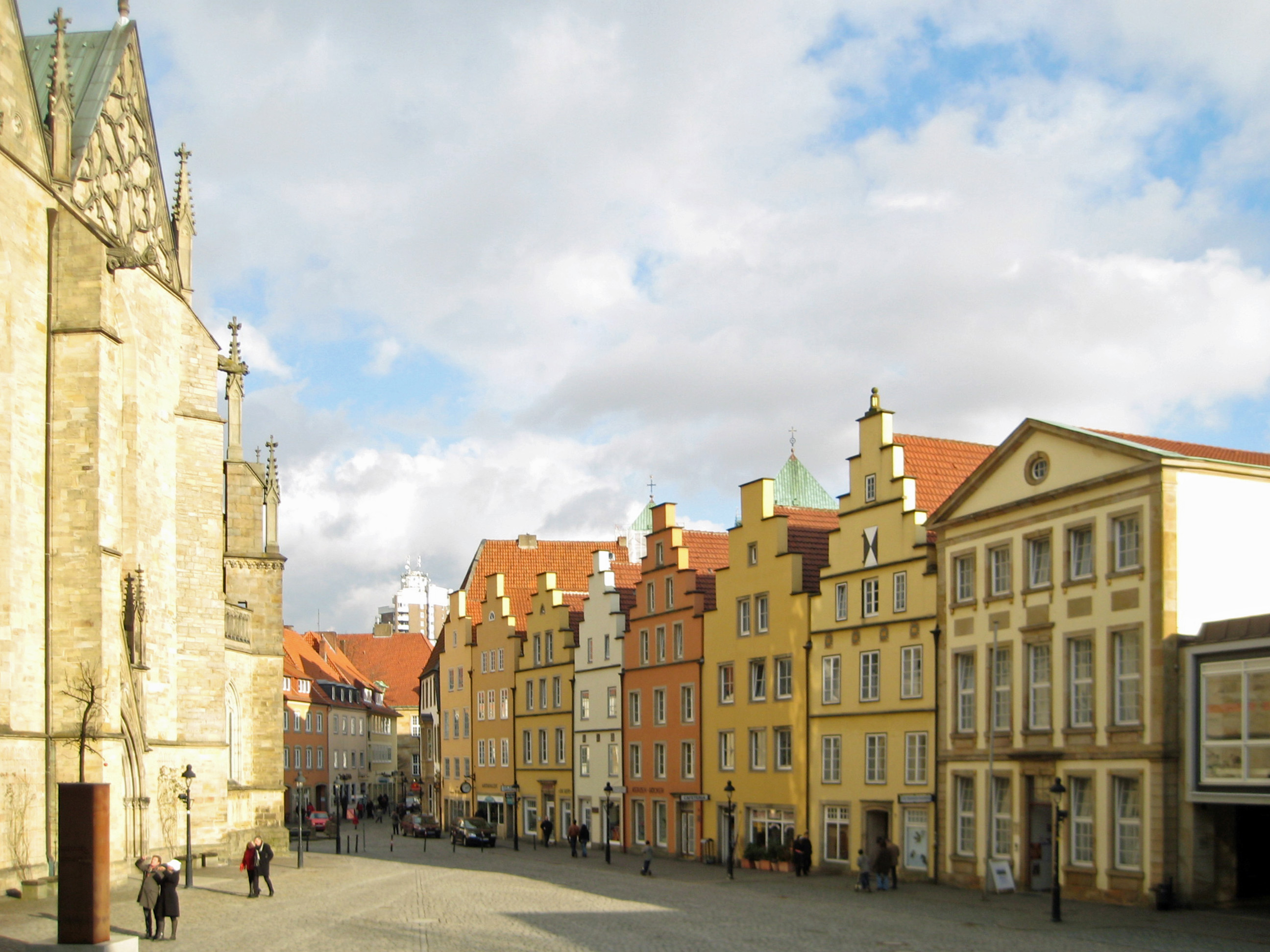
Old town Osnabrück

Osnabrück's old town (German: Altstadt) is the historic and original core of the city Osnabrück, Lower Saxony, Germany, also called Heger Tor Viertel.

== History ==
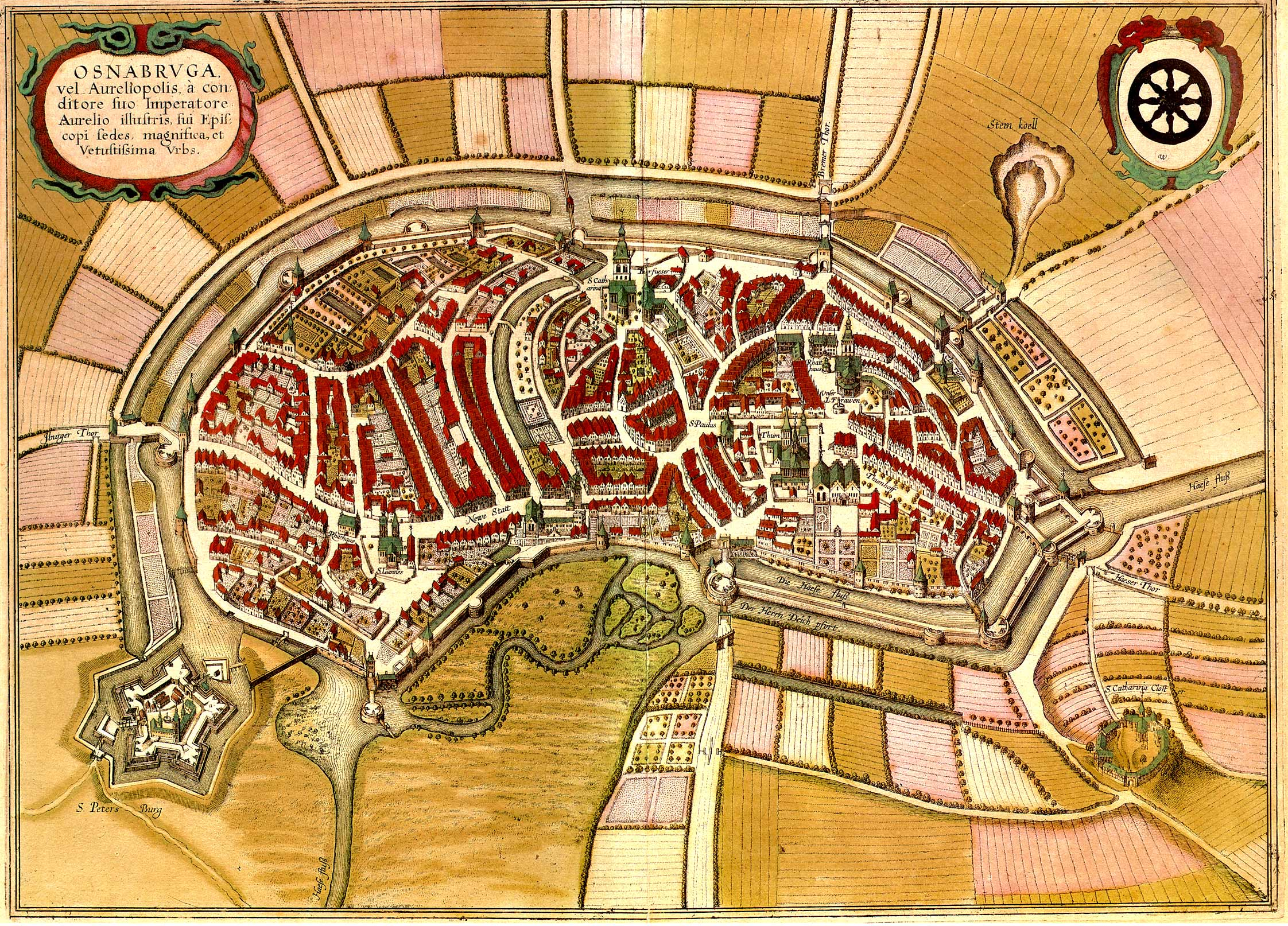
Map of the city from 1633 with its original town walls

The city was founded 780 by Charlemagne, king of the Franks. Around 800 made Charlemagne the area to the new bishopric and the missionary Wiho became Osnabrück's first bishop. The town walls with its towers from this time are the borders for the old town.

Osnabrück played an important role in the Thirty Years' War. The war that was mainly fought in central Europe was one of the longest and most destructive conflicts in European history. Initially the war started between Catholics and Protestants, although they were all Christians. As the time and the war drew on the conflict became more general involving most of the great powers in Europe. Between May and October 1648 were the peace treaties signed in Osnabrück and Münster. The Peace of Westphalia ended with that the Thirty Years' War and Osnabrück became the city of Peace with many historical artifacts from this time.

== Tourism and sights ==
=== Cathedral ===
The Sankt Peter cathedral of the Osnabrück bishopric was first ordained 785, and rebuilt twice. The second one was destroyed by a fire in 1100 and renovated from 1218 to 1277. The cathedral has two towers. The northwest tower is source; the other was replaced in the 15th century by a larger Gothic tower.

=== Town hall ===
It took over 25 years to finish the town hall which is located in the central of the old town just next to the Marienkirche. The hall is built in typical Late Gothic style with little towers on the corners and eight statues on the front side of the building. The peace treats for the Thirty Years' War were signed there in 1648 and 42 portraits are hung in the peace hall of European envoys and monarchs of the time, including Louis XIV of France and Christina, Queen of Sweden.

=== Marienkriche ===
The church is next to the town hall In 1543 it was changed to a Protestant church.

=== Heger Tor ===
The Heger Tor, also called Waterloo Tor is a part of the town walls and the entrance to the old town. The gate was rebuilt in 1817, two years after the battle of Waterloo. The gate was designed by Johann Christian Sieckmann. The gate looks like a triumphal arch.

== Picture gallery ==
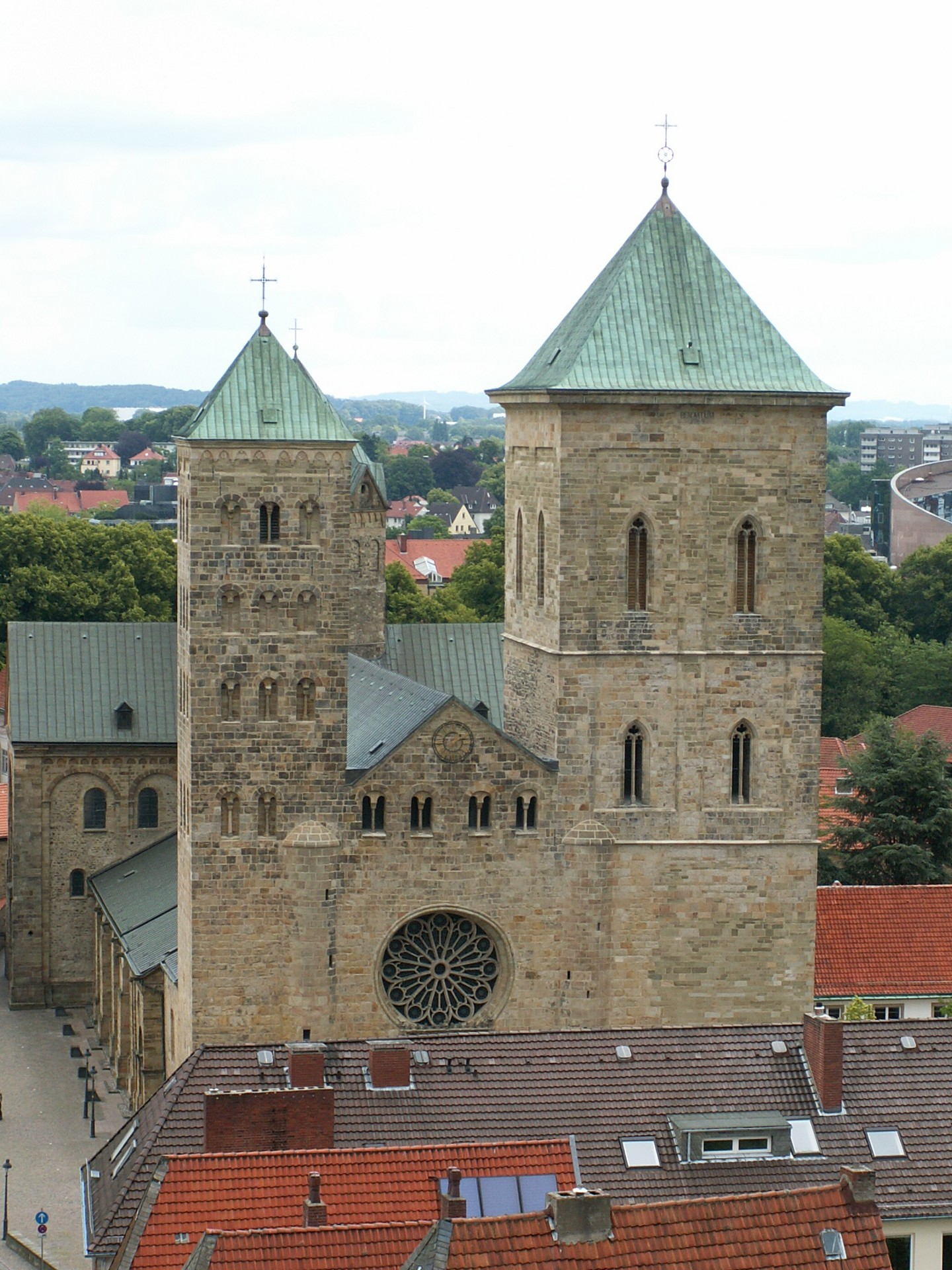
Sankt Peter cathedral

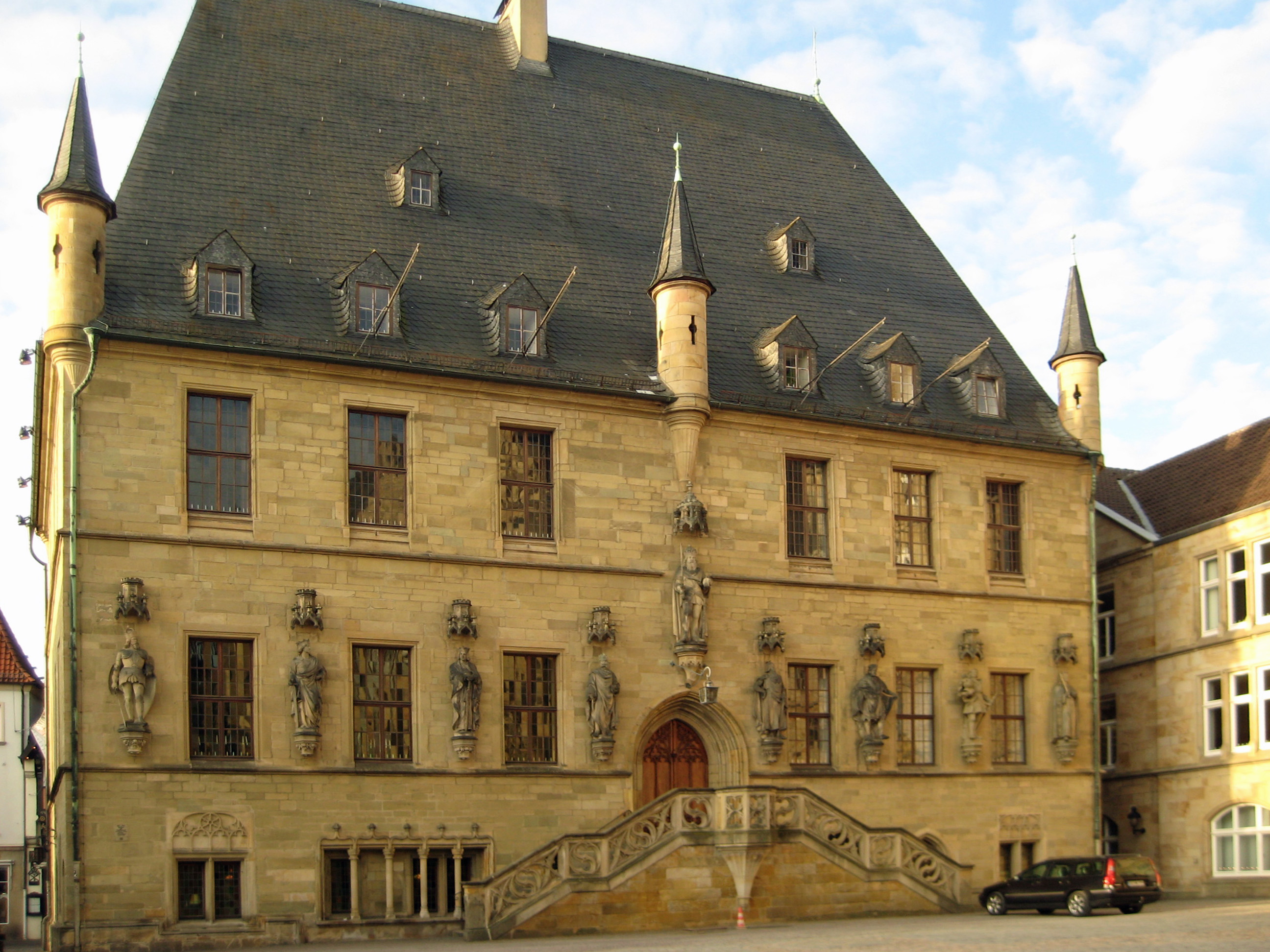
Town hall in 2008

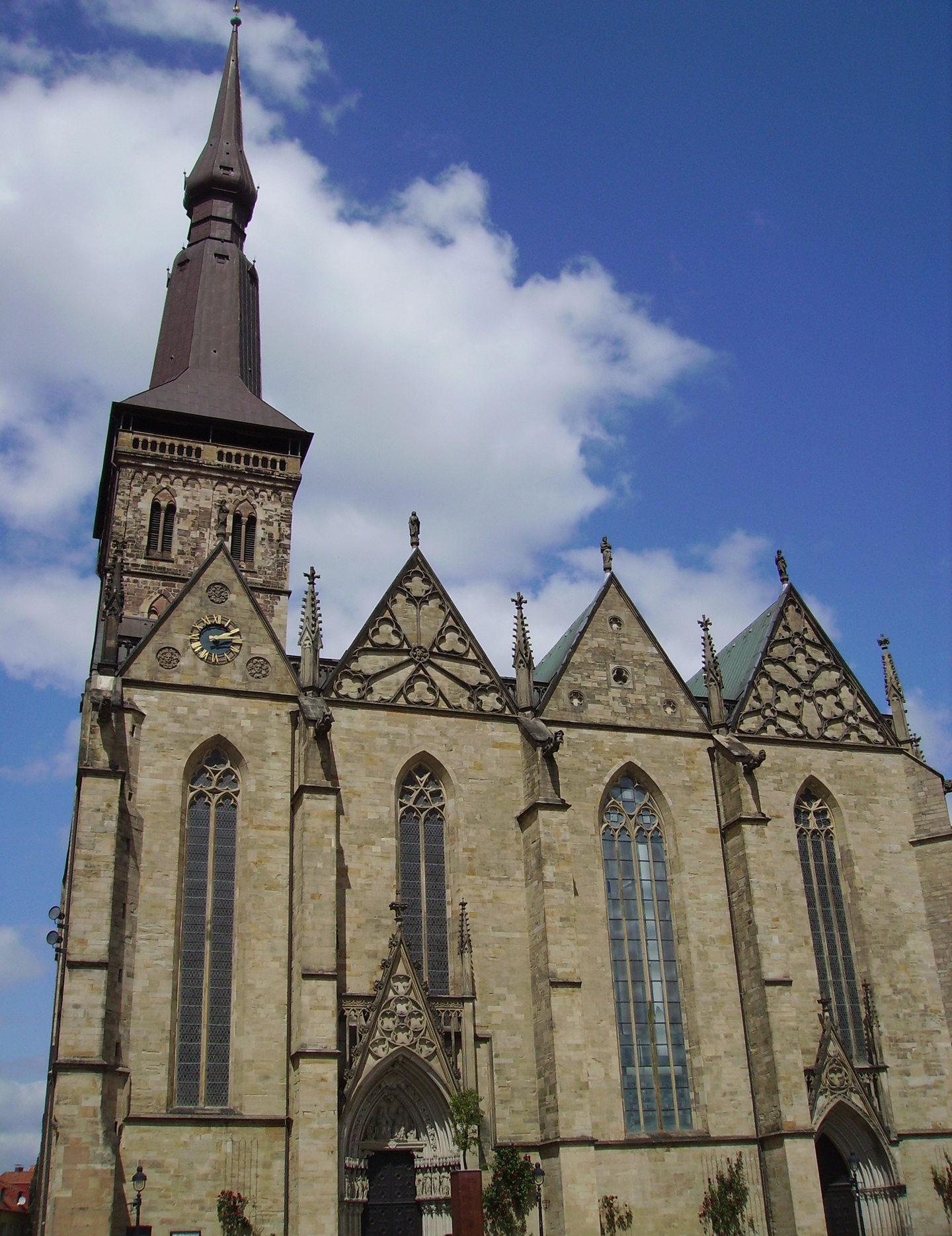
View from the market place on the Marienkirche

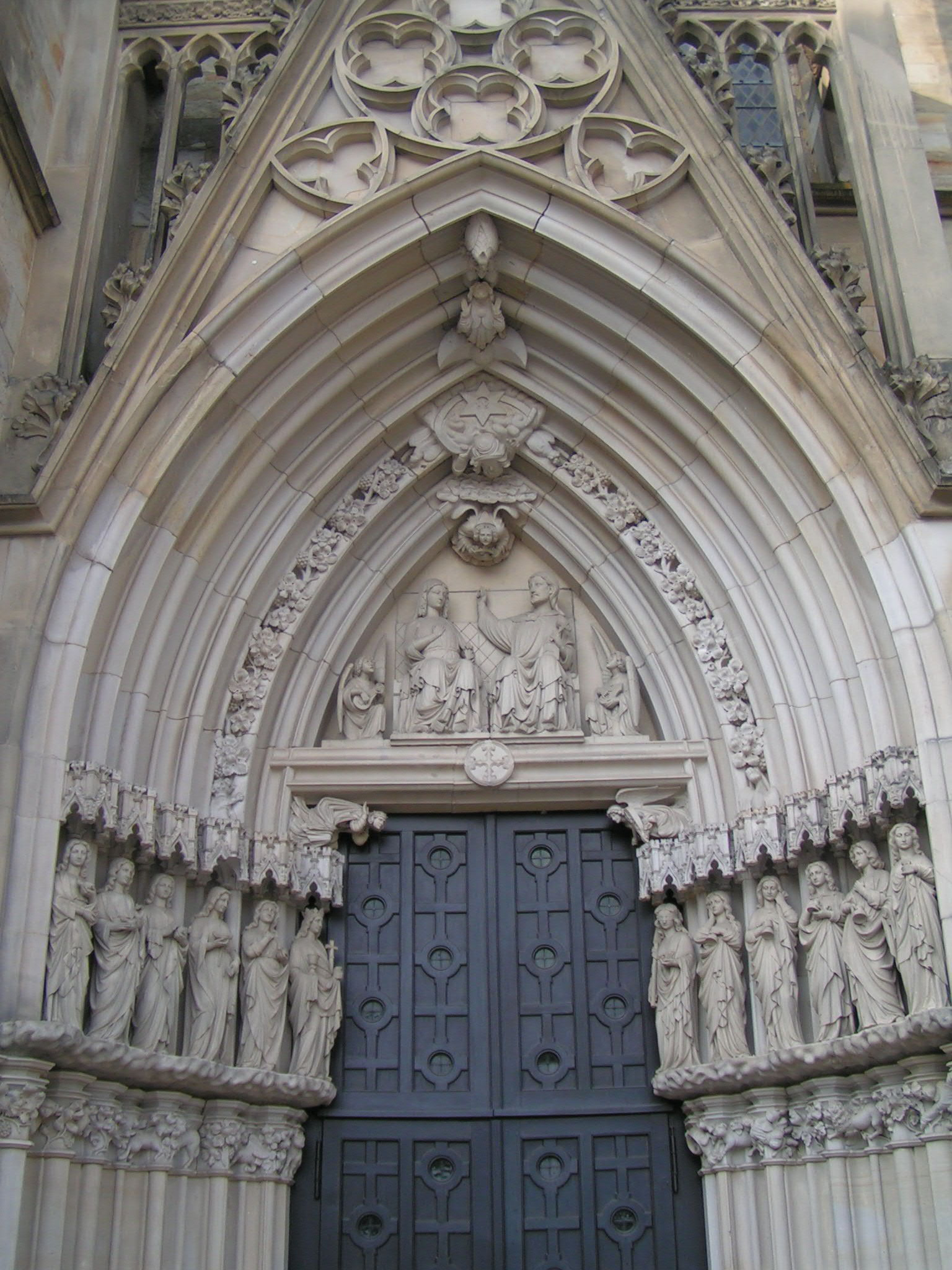
Brideportal on the church

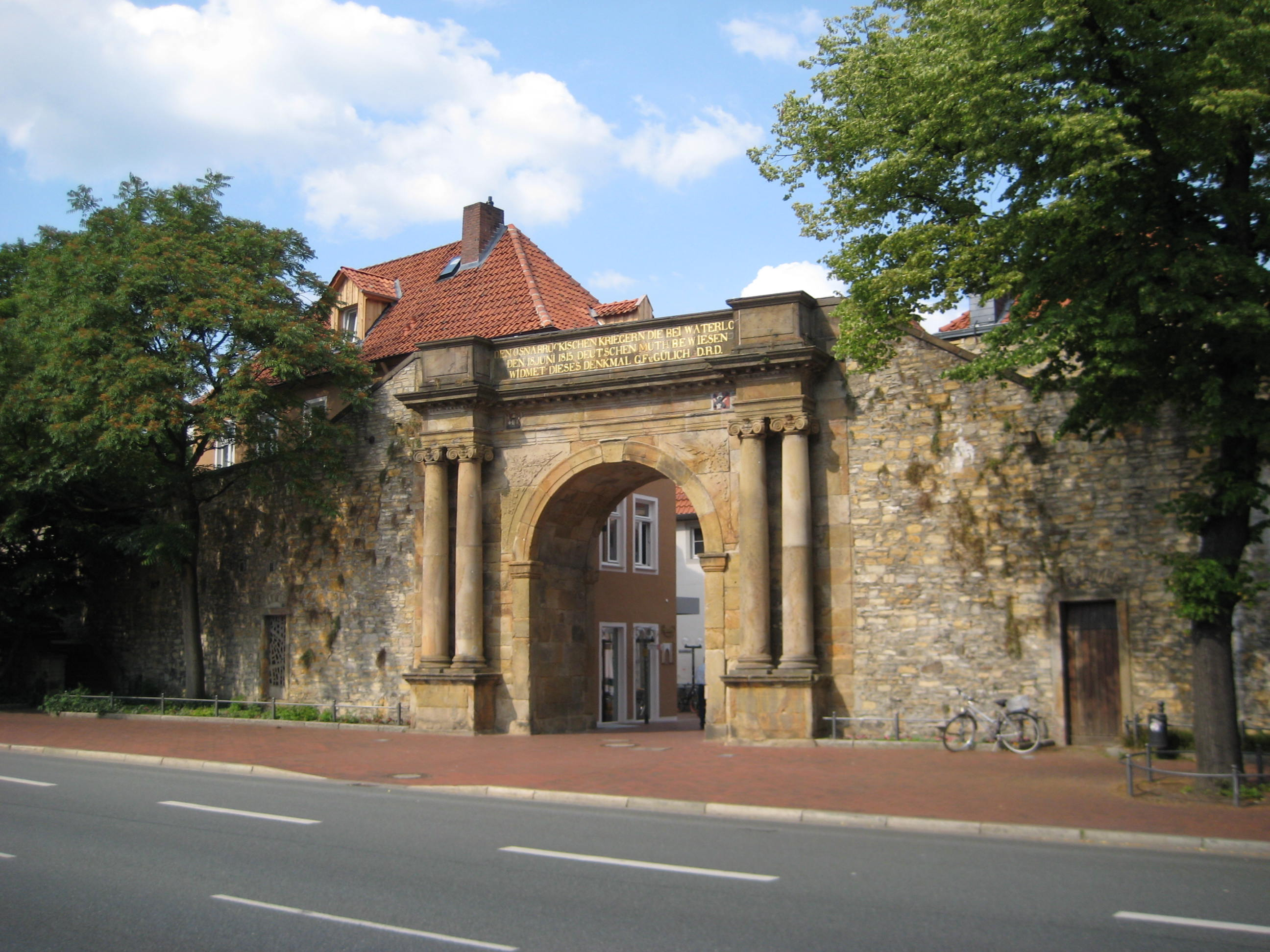
Heger Tor

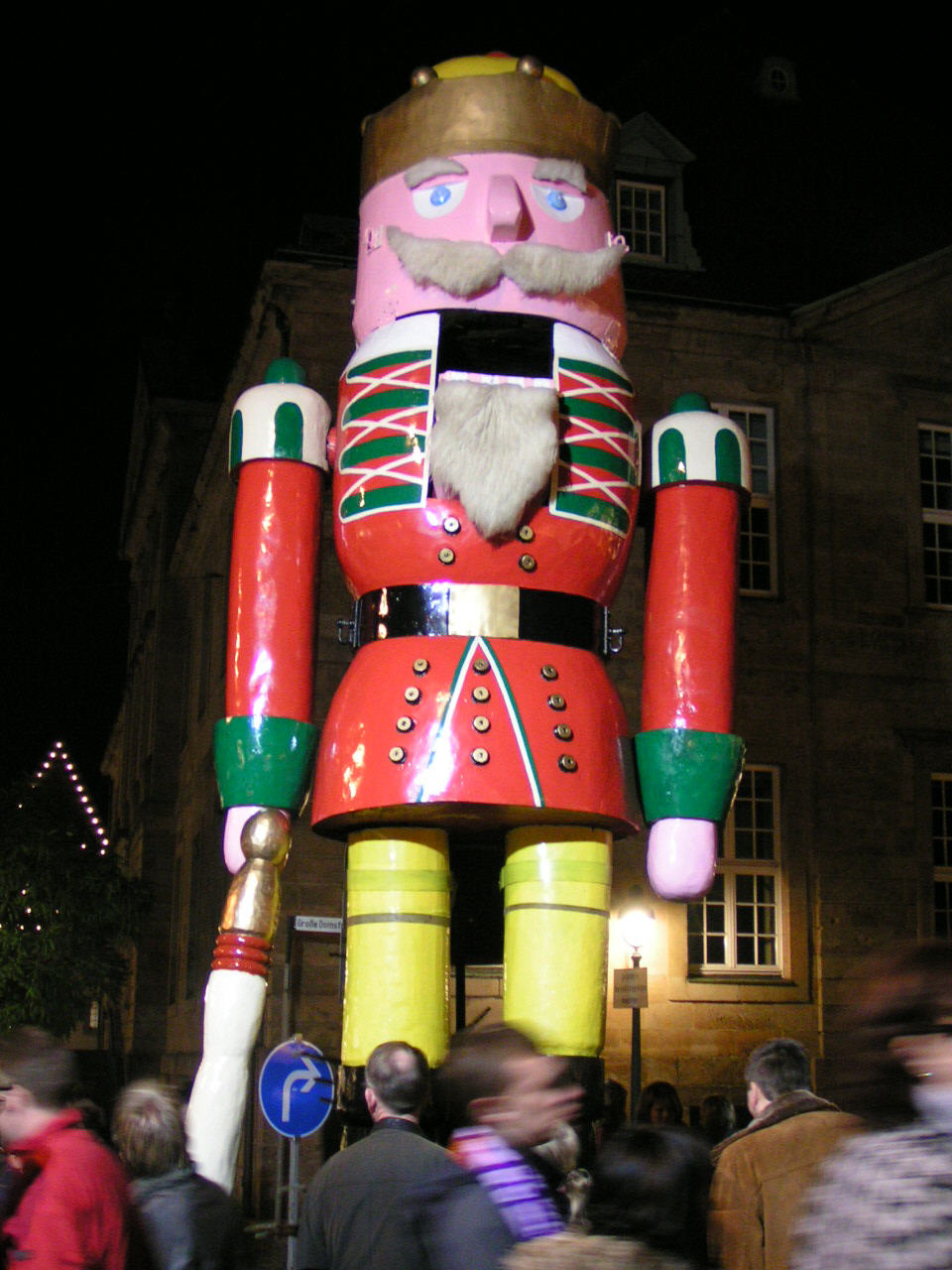
Nutcracker on the Christmas market
