= Old Town Hall Historic District (Huntington, New York) =

Historic district in New York, United States

- U.S. National Register of Historic Places
- U.S. Historic district
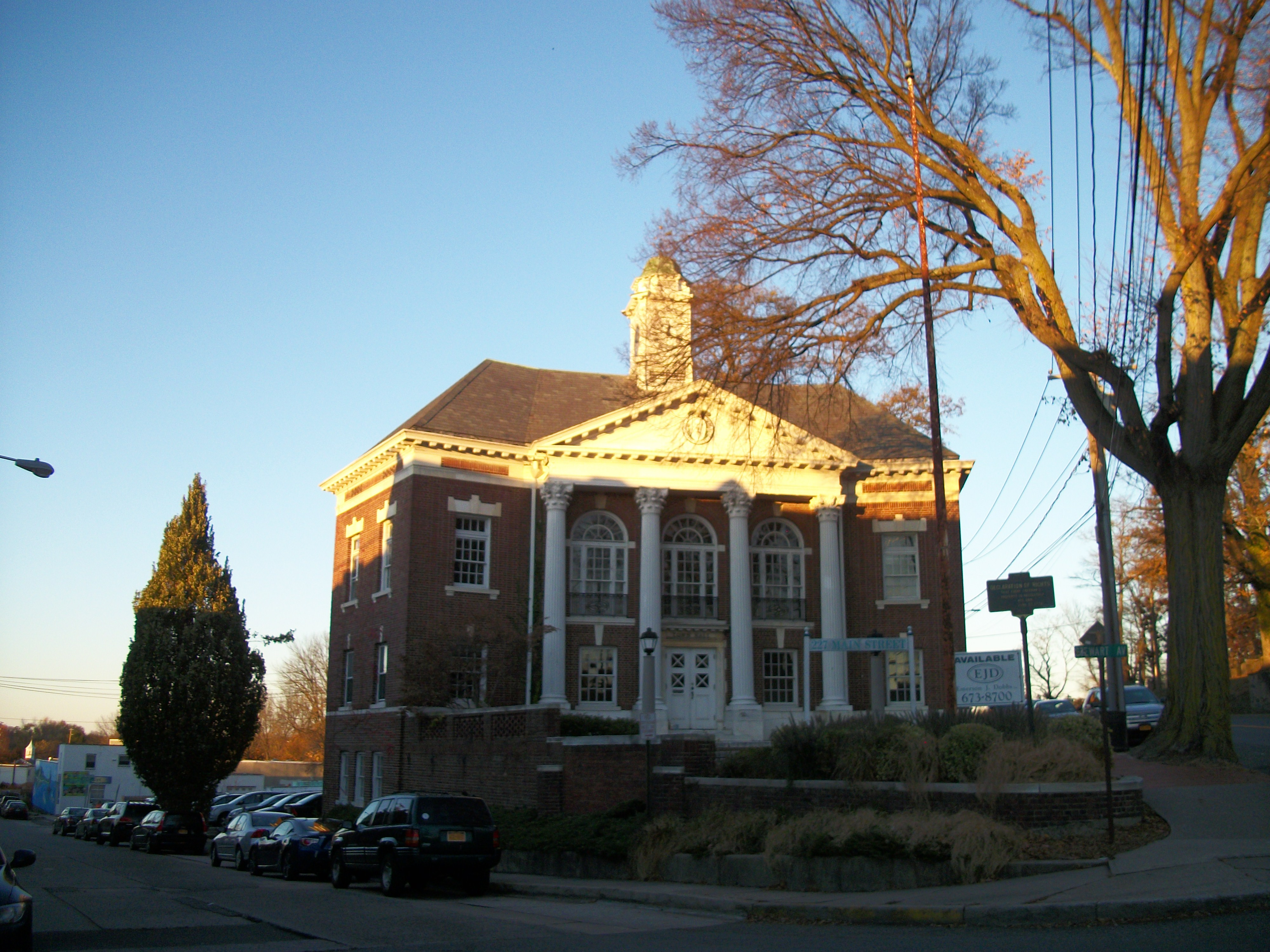
- The former Huntington Town Hall as seen from Stewart Avenue and West Main Street, November 13, 2013.

- Location within New York Location within the United States
- Interactive map showing the location for Huntington Old Town Hall District
- Location: Main St. & Nassau Rd., Huntington, New York
- Coordinates: 40°52′17″N 73°25′26″W
- Area: 5 acres (2.0 ha)
- Architect: Multiple
- Architectural style: Late 19th And 20th Century Revivals, Greek Revival, Late Victorian
- MPS: Huntington Town MRA
- NRHP reference No.: 85002588
- Added to NRHP: September 26, 1985

Old Town Hall Historic District is a national historic district located in Huntington, Suffolk County, New York. The district consists of eight contributing buildings, including civic structures, a church, a cemetery, and residential properties. These buildings represent a range of historical periods, with some dating back to the initial settlement in 1653 through to the early 20th century.

Notable sites within the district include the Old Huntington Town Hall, located at the northeast corner of Main Street and Stewart Avenue, the Fort Golgotha and the Old Burial Hill Cemetery situated across from the Town Hall, the First Universalist Society Church at 6 Nassau Road, and the former Huntington Sewing and Trade School.

The district was added to the National Register of Historic Places in 1985.
