= Old Town, Brunswick County, North Carolina =

Unincorporated community in North Carolina, US

Coordinates: 34°08′12″N 77°57′38″W

Old Town is an unincorporated community in Brunswick County, on N.C. 133.
