= Old Town, Forsyth County, North Carolina =

Coordinates: 36°09′58″N 80°20′01″W

Old Town (or Oldtown) is a former unincorporated community in North Carolina which was annexed by Winston-Salem. It was located near Bethania, Tobaccoville, and Pfafftown along NC 67. The name now refers to a neighborhood that occupies the former unincorporated community limits.

== Commercial development ==
The Old Town Center, a shopping center which opened in the second quarter of the 1960s, has had an increase of development over the years. It includes national retail establishments and restaurants Other non-local establishments are also featured at the shopping center.

== Neighborhood facilities ==
Old Town Park and its Neighborhood Center is south of the neighborhood towards Pfafftown. The Old Town Community Center offers dance sessions for clogging and line dancing.

Old Town Elementary School celebrated its 100th anniversary in 2024.
