= National Register of Historic Places listings in Huntington (town), New York =

This list is intended to provide a comprehensive listing of entries on the National Register of Historic Places in the Town of Huntington, New York. The locations of National Register properties for which the latitude and longitude coordinates are included below, may be seen in an online map.

== Listings ==
	Name on the Register	Image	Date listed	Location	City or town	Description
1	Bay Crest Historic District	Bay Crest Historic District	September 26, 1985 (#85002486)	Beech Avenue, Valley Road, and Woodside and Valley Drives; 40°54′02″N 73°25′04″W	Huntington Bay	
2	M. Baylis House		September 26, 1985 (#85002487)	530 Sweet Hollow Road; 40°47′24″N 73°25′02″W	Melville	
3	Beaux Arts Park Historic District	Beaux Arts Park Historic District	September 26, 1985 (#85002489)	Locust Lane, Upper & Lower Drives; 40°54′02″N 73°24′31″W	Huntington Bay	
4	Bethel AME Church and Manse	Bethel AME Church and Manse	September 26, 1985 (#85002490)	291 Park Avenue; 40°52′41″N 73°25′07″W	Huntington	
5	Bowes House		September 26, 1985 (#85002492)	15 Harbor Hill Road; 40°54′02″N 73°25′28″W	Huntington Bay	
6	George McKesson Brown Estate-Coindre Hall	George McKesson Brown Estate-Coindre Hall	September 26, 1985 (#85002493)	Brown's Road; 40°53′41″N 73°26′13″W	Huntington	
7	Brush Farmstead		September 26, 1985 (#85002500)	344 Greenlawn Rd. 40°52′02″N 73°22′31″W	Greenlawn	
8	Eliphas Buffett House	Eliphas Buffett House	September 26, 1985 (#85002495)	159 West Rogues Path; 40°50′16″N 73°26′38″W	Cold Spring Harbor	
9	Joseph Buffett House	Joseph Buffett House	September 26, 1985 (#85002497)	169 West Rogues Path; 40°50′16″N 73°26′43″W	Cold Spring Harbor	
10	John Bumpstead House		September 26, 1985 (#85002499)	473 Woodbury Road; 40°50′44″N 73°27′02″W	Cold Spring Harbor	Boundary decrease approved March 25, 2021.
11	Carll S. Burr Mansion	Carll S. Burr Mansion	September 26, 1985 (#85002502)	304 Burr Road; 40°51′04″N 73°17′47″W	Commack	A historic Second Empire mansion built in 1830 in Commack, New York by Carll S. Burr
12	Carll Burr, Jr., House	Carll Burr, Jr., House	September 26, 1985 (#85002503)	293 Burr Road; 40°51′04″N 73°18′06″W	Commack	
13	Carll House	Carll House	September 26, 1985 (#85002505)	380 Deer Park Avenue; 40°48′44″N 73°20′28″W	Dix Hills	Boundary decrease approved September 9, 2022.
14	Carll House	Carll House	September 26, 1985 (#85002504)	79 Wall Street; 40°52′26″N 73°25′40″W	Huntington	
15	Ezra Carll Homestead	Ezra Carll Homestead	September 26, 1985 (#85002506)	49 Melville Road; 40°49′40″N 73°23′48″W	South Huntington	
16	Marion Carll Farm	Marion Carll Farm	June 26, 1979 (#79001632)	475 Commack Road; 40°49′33″N 73°17′44″W	Commack	
17	Chichester's Inn	Chichester's Inn	September 26, 1985 (#85002508)	97 Chichester Road; 40°49′11″N 73°25′31″W	West Hills	17th-century inn frequented by Walt Whitman and Theodore Roosevelt at different times. A house today.
18	Cold Spring Harbor Beach Club	Cold Spring Harbor Beach Club	December 12, 2012 (#12001037)	101 Shore Rd. 40°52′34″N 73°28′10″W	Cold Spring Harbor	Official site
19	Cold Spring Harbor Fire District Hook and Ladder Company Building	Cold Spring Harbor Fire District Hook and Ladder Company Building	November 15, 2003 (#03001147)	Main Street at Elm Place; 40°52′10″N 73°27′39″W	Cold Spring Harbor	
20	Cold Spring Harbor Library	Cold Spring Harbor Library	September 26, 1985 (#85002509)	1 Shore Road; 40°52′20″N 73°27′40″W	Cold Spring Harbor	
21	Coltrane House	Coltrane House	June 29, 2007 (#07000628)	247 Candlewood Path; 40°47′59″N 73°19′27″W	Dix Hills	
22	Commack Methodist Church and Cemetery	Commack Methodist Church and Cemetery	September 26, 1985 (#85002511)	486 Townline Road; 40°50′41″N 73°17′36″W	Commack	
23	David Conklin House	David Conklin House	September 26, 1985 (#85002513)	2 High Street; 40°51′55″N 73°25′26″W	Huntington	
24	The Crest		October 3, 2007 (#85003645)	563 Asharoken Avenue; 40°56′22″N 73°23′09″W	Asharoken	Boundary change approved September 9, 2022.
25	Charles Homer Davis House	Charles Homer Davis House	February 22, 2006 (#06000057)	381 West Neck Road; 40°53′37″N 73°27′18″W	Lloyd Harbor	
26	Delamater-Bevin Mansion	Delamater-Bevin Mansion	September 26, 1985 (#85002514)	Bevin Lane; 40°56′05″N 73°22′43″W	Asharoken	
27	Harry E. Donnell House	Harry E. Donnell House	September 26, 1985 (#85002516)	71 Locust Lane; 40°56′02″N 73°23′21″W	Eatons Neck	
28	Arthur Dove-Helen Torr Cottage	Arthur Dove-Helen Torr Cottage	January 28, 2000 (#99001682)	30 Centershore Road; 40°53′16″N 73°22′21″W	Centerport	
29	Dowden Tannery	Dowden Tannery	September 26, 1985 (#85002519)	210 West Rogues Path; 40°50′16″N 73°26′58″W	Cold Spring Harbor	
30	East Shore Road Historic District	East Shore Road Historic District	September 26, 1985 (#85002521)	East Shore Road; 40°53′27″N 73°25′00″W	Halesite	
31	Eatons Neck Light	Eatons Neck Light	April 3, 1973 (#73001273)	Eatons Neck Point at Huntington Bay and Long Island Sound off Lighthouse Road; 40°57′15″N 73°23′48″W	Asharoken	
32	John Everit House	John Everit House	September 26, 1985 (#85002522)	130 Old Country Road; 40°47′33″N 73°25′18″W	West Hills	
33	N. J. Felix House	N. J. Felix House	September 26, 1985 (#85002523)	235 Asharoken Avenue; 40°55′41″N 73°21′47″W	Asharoken	
34	Marshall Field, III, Estate	Marshall Field, III, Estate	April 30, 1979 (#79001633)	Lloyd Harbor Road; 40°55′39″N 73°28′18″W	Lloyd Harbor	
35	Fort Golgotha and the Old Burial Hill Cemetery	Fort Golgotha and the Old Burial Hill Cemetery	March 2, 1981 (#81000415)	Main Street and Nassau Road; 40°52′17″N 73°25′26″W	Huntington	
36	Fort Hill Estate	Fort Hill Estate	June 2, 1988 (#88000599)	Fort Hill Drive; 40°55′04″N 73°29′19″W	Lloyd Harbor	
37	Charles Geoghegan House		September 26, 1985 (#85002524)	9 Harbor Hill Road; 40°54′07″N 73°25′23″W	Huntington Bay	
38	Gilsey Mansion	Gilsey Mansion	September 26, 1985 (#85002525)	36 Browns Road; 40°53′39″N 73°26′07″W	Huntington	
39	Goose Hill Road Historic District		September 26, 1985 (#85002528)	Goose Hill Road; 40°52′40″N 73°27′06″W	Cold Spring Harbor	
40	John Green House		September 26, 1985 (#85002526)	167 East Shore Road; 40°53′54″N 73°25′33″W	Huntington Bay	
41	Halsey Estate-Tallwood		September 26, 1985 (#85002527)	Sweet Hollow Road; 40°49′32″N 73°25′53″W	West Hills	
42	Harbor Road Historic District	Harbor Road Historic District	September 26, 1985 (#85002529)	Harbor Road; 40°51′34″N 73°27′43″W	Cold Spring Harbor	
43	John Harned House		September 26, 1985 (#85002530)	26 Little Neck Road; 40°53′16″N 73°21′55″W	Centerport	
44	Wallace K. Harrison Estate		September 26, 1985 (#85002531)	140 Round Swamp Road; 40°48′28″N 73°26′30″W	West Hills	
45	Heckscher Park	Heckscher Park	September 26, 1985 (#85002532)	Bounded by Madison Street, Sabbath Day Path, Main Street & Prime Avenue; 40°52′29″N 73°25′15″W	Huntington	
46	Hewlett House		September 26, 1985 (#85002533)	559 Woodbury Road; 40°50′13″N 73°27′12″W	Cold Spring Harbor	
47	House at 200 Bay Avenue		September 26, 1985 (#85002535)	200 Bay Avenue; 40°54′00″N 73°25′11″W	Huntington Bay	
48	House at 244 Park Avenue		September 26, 1985 (#85002534)	244 Park Avenue; 40°52′47″N 73°25′05″W	Huntington	
49	Ireland-Gardiner Farm		September 26, 1985 (#85002537)	863 Lake Road; 40°51′46″N 73°22′56″W	Greenlawn	
50	Jarvis-Fleet House	Jarvis-Fleet House	September 26, 1985 (#85002538)	138 Cove Road; 40°53′58″N 73°23′31″W	Huntington	
51	John P. Kane Mansion	John P. Kane Mansion	September 26, 1985 (#85002580)	37 Kanes Lane; 40°53′54″N 73°25′15″W	Huntington Bay	
52	Karpen House		July 26, 2006 (#06000643)	3 Harbor Hill Drive; 40°53′46″N 73°27′17″W	Lloyd Harbor	
53	A. P. W. Kennan House	A. P. W. Kennan House	November 6, 1985 (#85003502)	Sydney Road; 40°54′10″N 73°24′40″W	Huntington Bay	
54	B. Ketchum House	B. Ketchum House	September 26, 1985 (#85002581)	237 Middleville Road; 40°53′57″N 73°17′51″W	Fort Salonga	
55	LITTLE JENNIE (Chesapeake Bay bugeye)		May 12, 1986 (#86001081)	Centerport Harbor; 40°53′36″N 73°22′28″W	Centerport	
56	Lloyd Harbor Lighthouse	Lloyd Harbor Lighthouse	May 31, 1989 (#89000501)	Entrance to Lloyd Harbor; 40°54′39″N 73°25′54″W	Lloyd Harbor	
57	Joseph Lloyd House	Joseph Lloyd House	November 7, 1976 (#76001278)	Northwest of Huntington on Lloyd Harbor Road; 40°54′51″N 73°28′42″W	Lloyd Harbor	
58	Long Island National Cemetery	Long Island National Cemetery	March 22, 2016 (#16000113)	2040 Wellwood Ave. 40°45′27″N 73°23′48″W	Melville	Veterans' cemetery shared with town of Babylon to south built in 1930s to handle overflow from Cypress Hills soon expanded to take in 10,000 World War II veterans and POWs.
59	Isaac Losee House	Isaac Losee House	September 26, 1985 (#85002582)	269 Park Avenue; 40°52′44″N 73°25′07″W	Huntington	
60	Stanley H. Lowndes House		May 20, 2019 (#100003935)	155 Bayview Avenue; 40°54′18″N 73°21′17″W	Northport	1895 Queen Anne harborfront mansion built by local oyster magnate
61	Main Street Historic District	Main Street Historic District	September 26, 1985 (#85002583)	Main Street; 40°52′18″N 73°27′21″W	Cold Spring Harbor	
62	Northport Public Library	Northport Public Library	December 6, 1996 (#96001429)	215 Main Street; 40°54′05″N 73°20′38″W	Northport	
63	Northport Veterans Administration Hospital Historic District	Northport Veterans Administration Hospital Historic District	May 24, 2012 (#12000312)	79 Middleville Rd. 40°53′52″N 73°18′48″W	East Northport	part of the United States Second Generation Veterans Hospitals Multiple Property Submission
64	C. A. O'Donohue House		September 26, 1985 (#85002584)	158 Shore Road; 40°53′59″N 73°25′26″W	Huntington Bay	
65	John Oakley House		November 6, 1985 (#85003501)	Sweet Hollow Road; 40°49′14″N 73°25′31″W	West Hills	
66	Oheka	Oheka	September 15, 2004 (#04000996)	135 West Gate Drive; 40°49′40″N 73°26′55″W	Cold Springs Hills	
67	Old First Church	Old First Church	November 6, 1985 (#85003500)	126 Main Street; 40°52′28″N 73°25′11″W	Huntington	
68	Old Town Green Historic District	Old Town Green Historic District	September 26, 1985 (#85002586)	Park Avenue; 40°52′29″N 73°24′52″W	Huntington	
69	Old Town Hall Historic District	Old Town Hall Historic District	September 26, 1985 (#85002588)	Main Street & Nassau Road; 40°52′17″N 73°25′26″W	Huntington	
70	Potter-Williams House	Potter-Williams House	September 26, 1985 (#85002579)	165 Wall Street; 40°52′35″N 73°25′33″W	Huntington	
71	Prime House	Prime House	September 26, 1985 (#85002568)	35 Prime Avenue; 40°52′26″N 73°25′23″W	Huntington	
72	Prime-Octagon House	Prime-Octagon House	September 26, 1985 (#85002569)	41 Prime Avenue; 40°52′28″N 73°25′23″W	Huntington	
73	Michael Remp House	Michael Remp House	September 26, 1985 (#85002570)	42 Godfrey Lane; 40°50′49″N 73°21′05″W	Greenlawn	
74	Rogers House	Rogers House	September 26, 1985 (#85002571)	136 Spring Road; 40°51′57″N 73°24′56″W	Huntington	
75	John Rogers House	John Rogers House	September 26, 1985 (#85002572)	627 Half Hollow Road; 40°47′18″N 73°20′50″W	Dix Hills	
76	St. Paul's Methodist Episcopal Church		November 8, 2021 (#100007101)	270 Main St. 40°54′04″N 73°20′45″W	Northport	
77	Silas Sammis House	Silas Sammis House	September 26, 1985 (#85002573)	302 West Neck Road; 40°53′09″N 73°26′23″W	Huntington	
78	Seaman Farm		September 26, 1985 (#85002575)	1378 Carlls Straight Path; 40°48′37″N 73°19′11″W	Dix Hills	Demolished in 1995
79	Shore Road Historic District	Shore Road Historic District	September 26, 1985 (#85002578)	Shore Road; 40°52′22″N 73°27′45″W	Cold Spring Harbor	
80	Daniel Smith House	Daniel Smith House	September 26, 1985 (#85002576)	117 West Shore Road; 40°53′13″N 73°25′31″W	Huntington	
81	Henry Smith Farmstead	Henry Smith Farmstead	September 26, 1985 (#85002539)	900 Park Avenue; 40°51′03″N 73°22′48″W	Huntington Station	Also known as the John Gardiner Farm
82	Jacob Smith House	Jacob Smith House	September 26, 1985 (#85002540)	High Hold Drive; 40°48′46″N 73°26′16″W	West Hills	
83	Suydam House	Suydam House	October 27, 1988 (#88002135)	1 Fort Salonga Road; 40°53′09″N 73°22′01″W	Centerport	
84	Sweet Hollow Presbyterian Church Parsonage		September 26, 1985 (#85002541)	152 Old Country Road; 40°47′33″N 73°25′05″W	Melville	
85	Titus-Bunce House	Titus-Bunce House	September 26, 1985 (#85002542)	7 Goose Hill Road; 40°52′27″N 73°27′06″W	Cold Spring Harbor	
86	Henry Townsend House	Henry Townsend House	September 26, 1985 (#85002543)	231 West Neck Road; 40°55′33″N 73°26′12″W	Huntington	
87	US Post Office-Northport	US Post Office-Northport	May 11, 1989 (#88002356)	244 Main Street; 40°54′02″N 73°20′52″W	Northport	
88	Charles Van Iderstine Mansion		September 26, 1985 (#85002544)	Idle Day Drive; 40°54′13″N 73°21′48″W	Centerport	
89	Van Wyck-Lefferts Tide Mill	Van Wyck-Lefferts Tide Mill	December 27, 1978 (#78001916)	2 miles (3.2 km) northeast of Mill and Southdown Roads; 40°53′59″N 73°26′42″W	Lloyd Harbor	
90	William K. Vanderbilt Estate-Eagles Nest	William K. Vanderbilt Estate-Eagles Nest	September 26, 1985 (#85002545)	Little Neck Road; also 180 and 185 Little Neck Rd. 40°54′18″N 73°22′04″W	Centerport	Second set of addresses represent a boundary increase approved February 2, 2021
91	N. Velzer House and Caretaker's Cottage	N. Velzer House and Caretaker's Cottage	September 26, 1985 (#85002546)	22 Fort Salonga Road; 40°53′10″N 73°21′47″W	Centerport	
92	Charles M. Weeks House	Charles M. Weeks House	September 26, 1985 (#85002547)	76 Mill Lane; 40°52′45″N 73°25′10″W	Huntington	
93	West Neck Road Historic District	West Neck Road Historic District	September 26, 1985 (#85002567)	West Neck Road; 40°52′22″N 73°25′58″W	Huntington	
94	Joseph Whitman House		September 26, 1985 (#85002548)	365 West Hills Road; 40°49′14″N 73°25′19″W	West Hills	
95	Walt Whitman House	Walt Whitman House	September 26, 1985 (#85002549)	246 Old Walt Whitman Road; 40°49′01″N 73°24′44″W	West Hills	
96	Whitman-Place House		September 26, 1985 (#85002550)	69 Chichester Road; 40°49′11″N 73°25′08″W	West Hills	
97	Wiggins-Rolph House		September 26, 1985 (#85002551)	518 Park Avenue; 40°52′18″N 73°24′37″W	Huntington	
98	Henry Williams House	Henry Williams House	September 26, 1985 (#85002552)	43 Mill Lane; 40°52′44″N 73°25′22″W	Halesite	
99	Harry Wood House	Harry Wood House	September 26, 1985 (#85002553)	481 West Main Street; 40°52′28″N 73°26′27″W	Huntington	
100	John Wood House		September 26, 1985 (#85002554)	121 McKay Road; 40°51′10″N 73°25′29″W	Huntington Station	
101	William Wooden Wood House		September 26, 1985 (#85002555)	90 Preston Street; 40°53′20″N 73°25′34″W	Huntington	
102	Charles Woodhull House	Charles Woodhull House	September 26, 1985 (#85002564)	70 Main Street; 40°52′28″N 73°25′05″W	Huntington	

== See also ==
- National Register of Historic Places listings in New York
- National Register of Historic Places listings in Suffolk County, New York
