= Old Town Green Historic District =

Historic district in New York, United States

- U.S. National Register of Historic Places
- U.S. Historic district
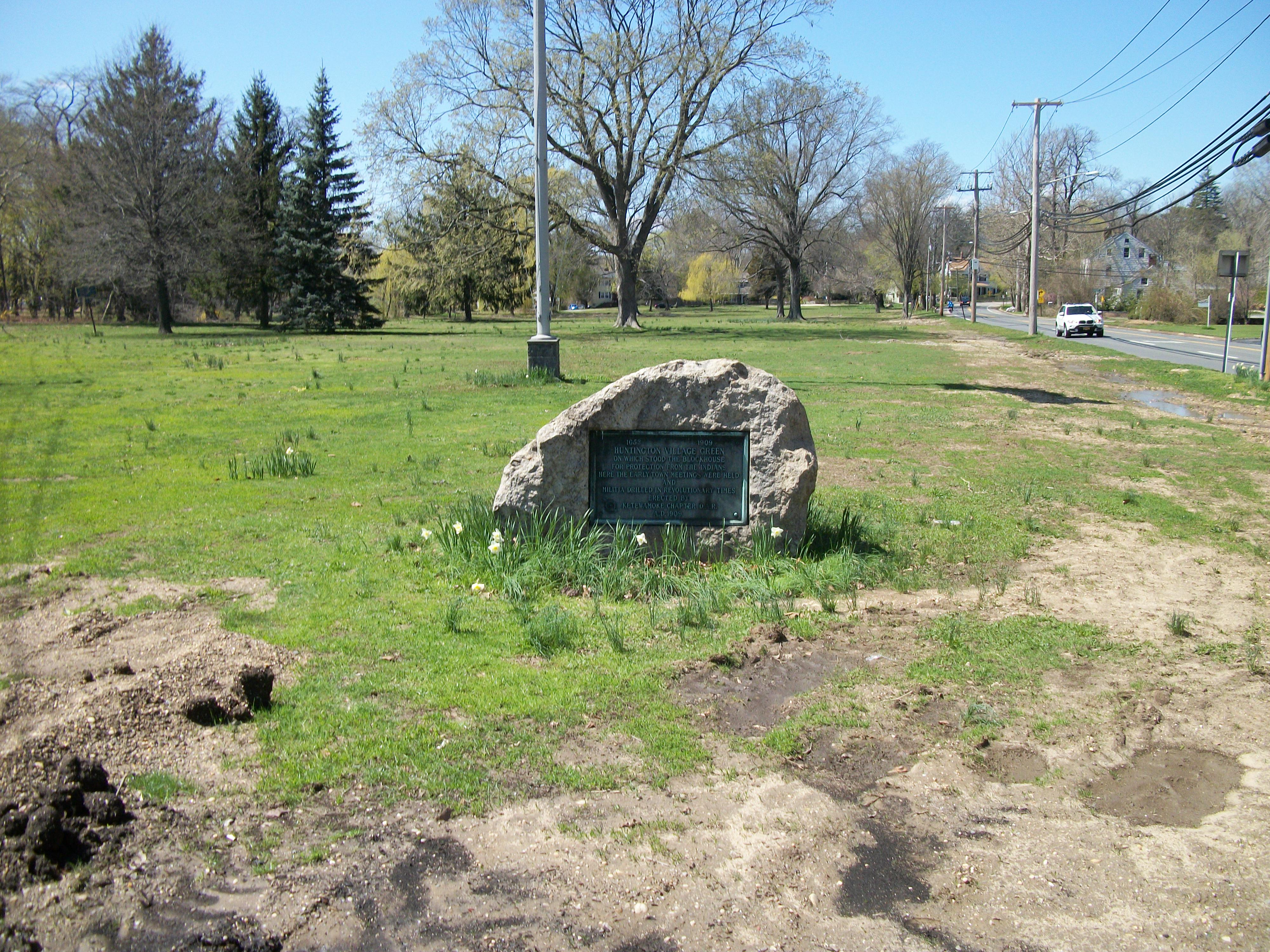
- Historic Marker Stone at the Huntington Town Green

- Location within New York Location within the United States
- Location: Park Ave., Huntington, New York
- Coordinates: 40°52′29″N 73°24′52″W
- Area: 14 acres (5.7 ha)
- Architectural style: Federal
- MPS: Huntington Town MRA
- NRHP reference No.: 85002586
- Added to NRHP: September 26, 1985

Old Town Green Historic District is a national historic district located at Huntington in Suffolk County, New York. The district which has 14 contributing buildings, is officially located on Park Avenue, but expands west along West Main Street. It is a small residential enclave that includes the town green. This green contains an oak tree named "Constitution Oak," that was planted on the 200th Anniversary of New York State's ratification of the Constitution of the United States. Seven of the eight dwellings date to the settlement period in 1653. Located in the district are structures such as the Charles Woodhull House, the Dr. Daniel Kissam House Museum, and the Fort Golgotha and the Old Burial Hill Cemetery.

It was added to the National Register of Historic Places in 1985.
