= Whitman-Place House =

Historic house in New York, United States

- U.S. National Register of Historic Places
- Location within New York Location within the United States
- Location: 69 Chichester Rd., West Hills, New York
- Coordinates: 40°49′11″N 73°25′8″W
- Area: 5.5 acres (2.2 ha)
- Built: 1810
- Architect: Whitman, Tredwell
- Architectural style: Greek Revival
- MPS: Huntington Town MRA
- NRHP reference No.: 85002550
- Added to NRHP: September 26, 1985

Whitman-Place House is a historic home located at West Hills in Suffolk County, New York. It was built about 1810 and is a 2 1/2-story, three-bay shingled residence which was greatly enlarged with a 2 1/2-story, three-bay south wing built in the 20th century. Also on the property is an early-19th-century barn and springhouse.

It was added to the National Register of Historic Places in 1985.
