= John Everit House =

Historic house in New York, United States

- U.S. National Register of Historic Places
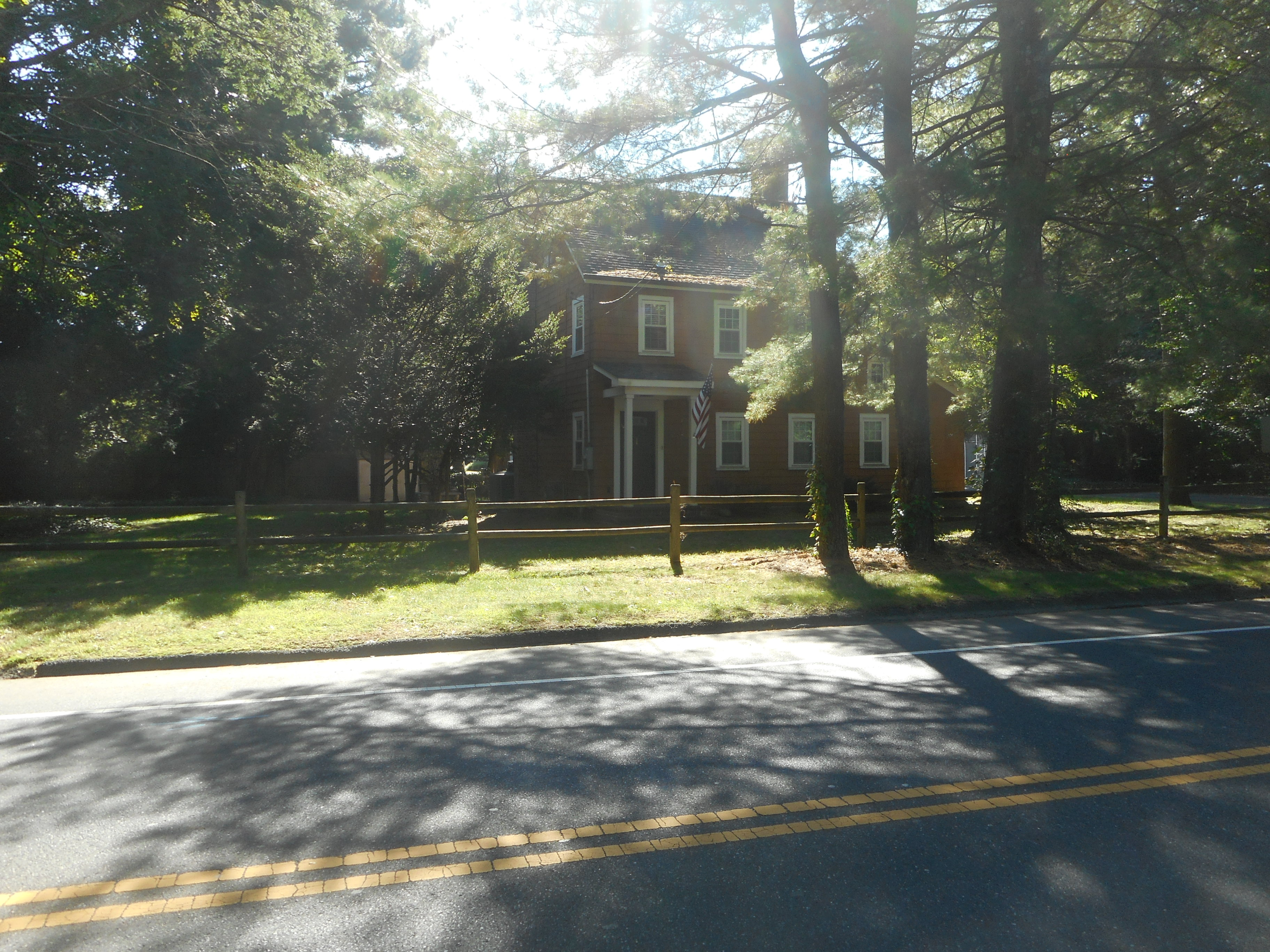
- The house as seen from the northwest corner of Old Country Road and Sweet Hollow Road

- Location within New York Location within the United States
- Location: 130 Old Country Rd., West Hills, New York
- Coordinates: 40°47′33″N 73°25′18″W
- Area: 2.5 acres (1.0 ha)
- Built: 1830
- MPS: Huntington Town MRA
- NRHP reference No.: 85002522
- Added to NRHP: September 26, 1985

John Everit House is a historic home located at Melville in Suffolk County, New York. It was built about 1820 and is a 2 1/2-story, three-bay, shingled dwelling with a 1 1/2-story, two-bay east wing. Also on the property are a shed, bar, and well.

It is one of the earliest houses in the historic district and has a stone foundation. By 1873 it belonged to Dr. George Conklin, who enlarged it for his medical practice. The first meeting of the Session of the Sweet Hollow Church likely met here in 1829.

It was added to the National Register of Historic Places in 1985.
