= Jacob Smith House =

Historic house in New York, United States

- U.S. National Register of Historic Places
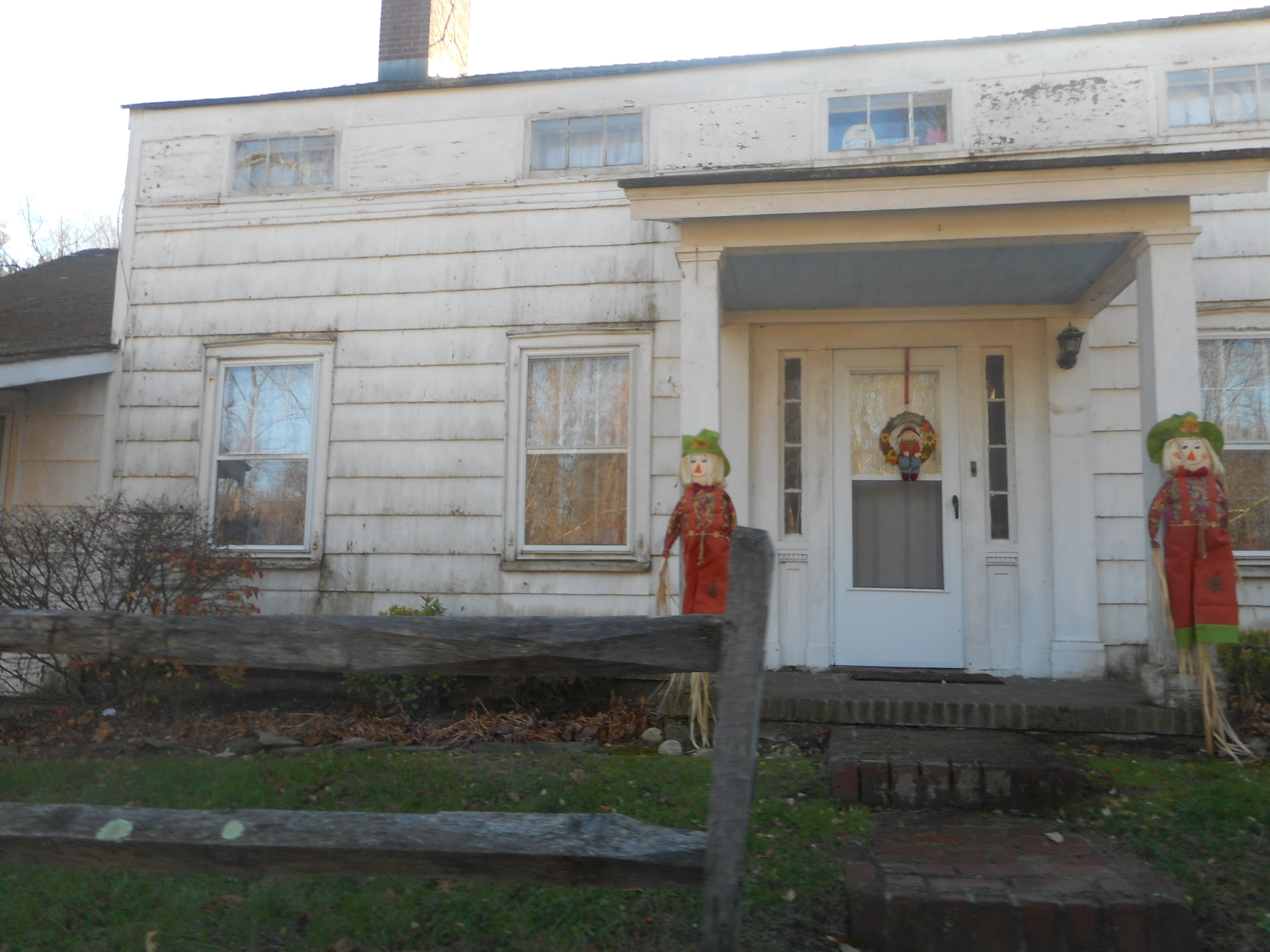
- Quick shot of the Jacob Smith House; November 2019.

- Location within New York Location within the United States
- Location: High Hold Dr., West Hills, New York
- Coordinates: 40°48′46″N 73°26′16″W
- Area: 2 acres (0.81 ha)
- Built: 1740
- Architect: Smith, Jacob
- Architectural style: Greek Revival
- MPS: Huntington Town MRA
- NRHP reference No.: 85002540
- Added to NRHP: September 26, 1985

Jacob Smith House is a historic home located at West Hills in Suffolk County, New York. It consists of a three-bay, 1 1/2-story saltbox built about 1740 and a five-bay, 1 1/2-story dwelling with a shed roof wing added about 1830.

The house is located within West Hills County Park. It was added to the National Register of Historic Places in 1985.
