= Huntington Harbor Light =

Lighthouse on Long Island, New York, US

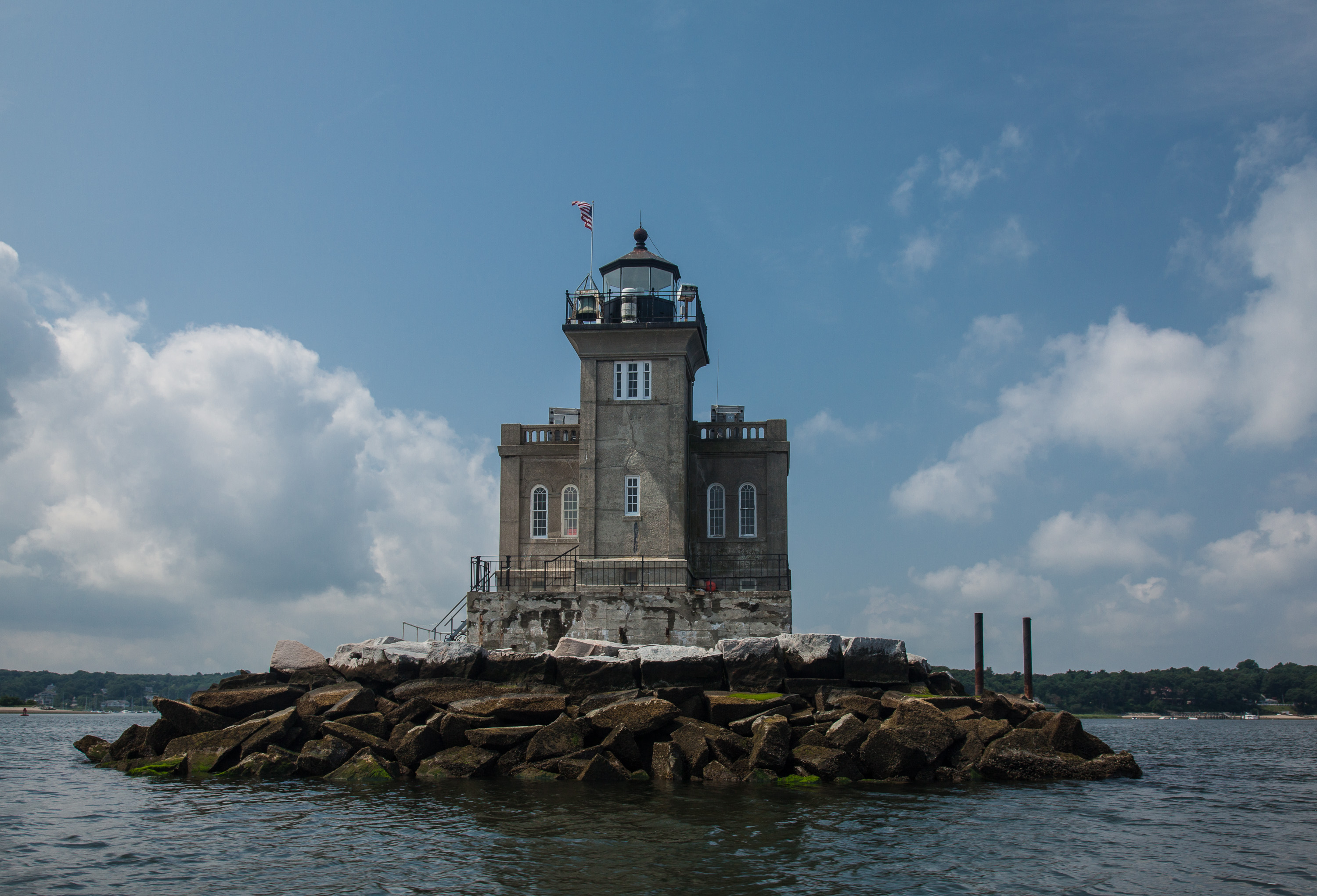
- Location: Huntington Bay on Long Island
- Coordinates: 40°54′38.6″N 73°25′52.7″W

Tower
- Constructed: 1857
- Foundation: Cast reinforced concrete crib
- Construction: reinforced concrete
- Automated: 1949
- Height: 42 feet (13 m)
- Shape: Square "Castle" Beaux-Arts
- Markings: Natural
- Heritage: National Register of Historic Places listed place

Light
- First lit: 1912
- Focal height: 41 feet (12 m)
- Lens: Fifth Order Fresnel lens (original), 12 inches (300 mm) (current)
- Range: 9 nmi (17 km; 10 mi)
- Characteristic: Iso W 6s
- Lloyd Harbor Lighthouse
- U.S. National Register of Historic Places
- Nearest city: Lloyd Harbor, New York
- Area: 0.2 acres (0.081 ha)
- Built: 1912
- Architect: Mead, Chas. & Co.
- NRHP reference No.: 89000501
- Added to NRHP: May 31, 1989

Huntington Harbor Light, formerly known as Lloyd Harbor Lighthouse, is a lighthouse in Huntington Bay on Long Island, New York.

The lighthouse was established in 1857 and the current tower was first lit in 1912. The light was automated in 1949 and is still operational. The foundation is cast reinforced concrete crib and the lighthouse is made out of cast reinforced concrete. The tower is square "castle" in the Beaux-Arts style. In 1912 a fifth order Fresnel lens was installed.

In 1857, a lighthouse was built on the tip of Lloyd's Neck to assist ships in finding shelter in Lloyd Harbor from the wind and waves that often hinder navigation on the Long Island Sound. This first lighthouse, called the Lloyd Harbor Light, was of little help to ships entering the adjoining Huntington Harbor. In 1912, a new lighthouse was built to serve Huntington Harbor.

The new structure was a unique lighthouse, in both design and construction. The Beaux Arts style makes the light look like a small castle. The reinforced concrete foundation and structure is unique to the area, as well. The foundation for the light was built nearby on land, then floated to the site and sunk.

This Lighthouse was staffed by members of the United States Lighthouse Service from 1912 until 1939, and by the United States Coast Guard since then.

In 1949, the light was fully automated. The deterioration of the unoccupied lighthouse started and would continue for almost two decades.

As a result of a 1983 survey, the light was deemed unsafe for servicing personnel and too expensive to repair. The Coast Guard considered demolishing the lighthouse and erecting a steel tower.

In 1985, a group called Save Huntington's Lighthouse was formed by local citizens to save the lighthouse from demolition. It became the first private group in the country to successfully take over and restore an offshore lighthouse. Now known as the Huntington Lighthouse Preservation Society, the group continues to enlist volunteers and raise funds for ongoing restoration and preservation work.

The lighthouse was placed on the National Register of Historic Places in 1988 under the name of Lloyd Harbor Lighthouse with reference number #89000501.
