= Joseph Whitman House =

Historic house in New York, United States

- U.S. National Register of Historic Places
- Location within New York Location within the United States
- Location: 365 W. Hills Rd., West Hills, New York
- Coordinates: 40°49′14.5″N 73°25′18.5″W
- Area: 2 acres (0.81 ha)
- Built: ca. 1692
- Architect: Whitman, Joseph
- MPS: Huntington Town MRA
- NRHP reference No.: 85002548
- Added to NRHP: September 26, 1985

Joseph Whitman House is a historic home located at West Hills in Suffolk County, New York. It was built about 1692 and is a 1 1/2-story, four-bay shingled residence with a 1 1/2-story two-bay south wing. Also on the property is the site of a stone fort and an early-19th-century barn and shed.

It was added to the National Register of Historic Places in 1985.
