= House at 200 Bay Avenue =

Historic house in New York, United States

- U.S. National Register of Historic Places
- Location within New York Location within the United States
- Location: 200 Bay Ave., Huntington Bay, New York
- Coordinates: 40°54′0″N 73°25′11″W
- Area: 1 acre (0.40 ha)
- Built: 1890
- Architectural style: Tudor Revival
- MPS: Huntington Town MRA
- NRHP reference No.: 85002535
- Added to NRHP: September 26, 1985

House at 200 Bay Avenue is a historic home located at Huntington Bay in Suffolk County, New York. It was built about 1890 and is a large, rambling 2 1/2-story, gable-roofed residence with a shingled first floor and stucco and half-timbered second floor. It is representative of the Tudor Revival style. Also on the property is the building containing the original garage / servant's quarters.

It was added to the National Register of Historic Places in 1985.
