= Chichester's Inn =

Historic inn in New York, United States

- U.S. National Register of Historic Places
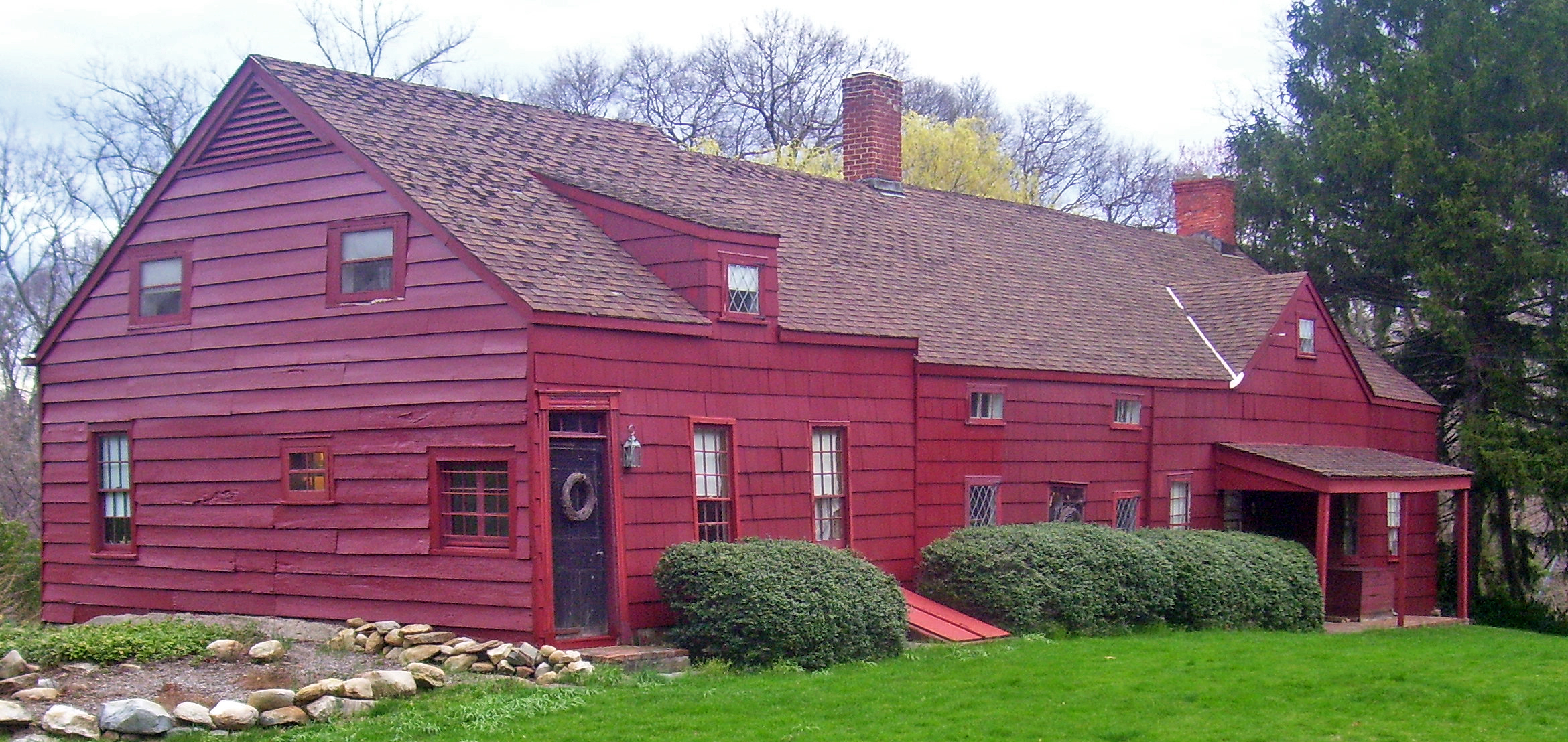
- Front (south) elevation and west profile, 2008

- Location within New York Location within the United States
- Location: 97 Chichester Road, West Hills, New York
- Coordinates: 40°49′11″N 73°25′31″W
- Area: 2.3 acres (0.93 ha)
- Built: 1680
- Architect: Chichester Family
- MPS: Huntington Town MRA
- NRHP reference No.: 85002508
- Added to NRHP: September 26, 1985

Chichester's Inn is located along Chichester Road in a wooded section of West Hills, New York, United States. It is a rare surviving example of a 17th-century inn on Long Island, mostly unchanged from its original form, although it is now used as a house. Walt Whitman, who grew up in the area, and Theodore Roosevelt were among its past patrons. In 1985 it was added to the National Register of Historic Places.

== Building and grounds ==
The main house is a 1 1/2-story, 11-bay clapboard structure of varied fenestration and form, reflecting considerable work and expansion in the first century of its existence. There are three entrances in the main facade, two with 19th-century panelled doors and the other with a vertical plank door and strap hinges. The main entrance has a shed-roofed porch. Large chimneys rise from the roof and two one-story wings project from the rear of the house. A small porch has also been built at the east end of the house, screened from sight by surrounding vegetation.

Much original interior detail, including hardware, moldings and panelling. A unique 17th-century removable wall, complete with hinges, still exists, as does the old taproom and winding box stairs.

The 2.3-acre (920 m^{2}) lot on which the inn was built includes one contributing property. A springhouse, built in the 19th century and featuring a rubblestone foundation, clapboard siding, gabled roof and vertical plank door, is located behind the house.

== History ==
A tavern had existed on the site since 1660, when the town board authorized Thomas Brush to build an "ordinary" on the site, in the wooded West Hills that were then sparsely settled. Twenty years later, his building burned and the Chichester family bought the land and built the beginnings of the current structure, a small 1 1/2-story cottage with two rooms and a bed in the attic crawl space. Throughout the 18th and early 19th century, they kept adding onto it as needed, accounting for its ramshackle shape.

The springhouse was built at that time, and that seemed to adequately serve the inn's needs. It no longer did any work other than routine maintenance, and the inn continued to be a popular local gathering spot for most of the 19th century, until the family decided to stop. Theodore Roosevelt and Walt Whitman, who grew up in the area, were among the most frequent visitors.

The Chichester family sold it in the early 20th century, and it has remained a private residence ever since. In 1980 a portion of the roof caught fire, but it has been restored to be nearly equivalent to its pre-existing condition.

== See also ==
- List of the oldest buildings in New York
