= Beaux Arts Park Historic District =

Historic district in New York, United States

- U.S. National Register of Historic Places
- U.S. Historic district
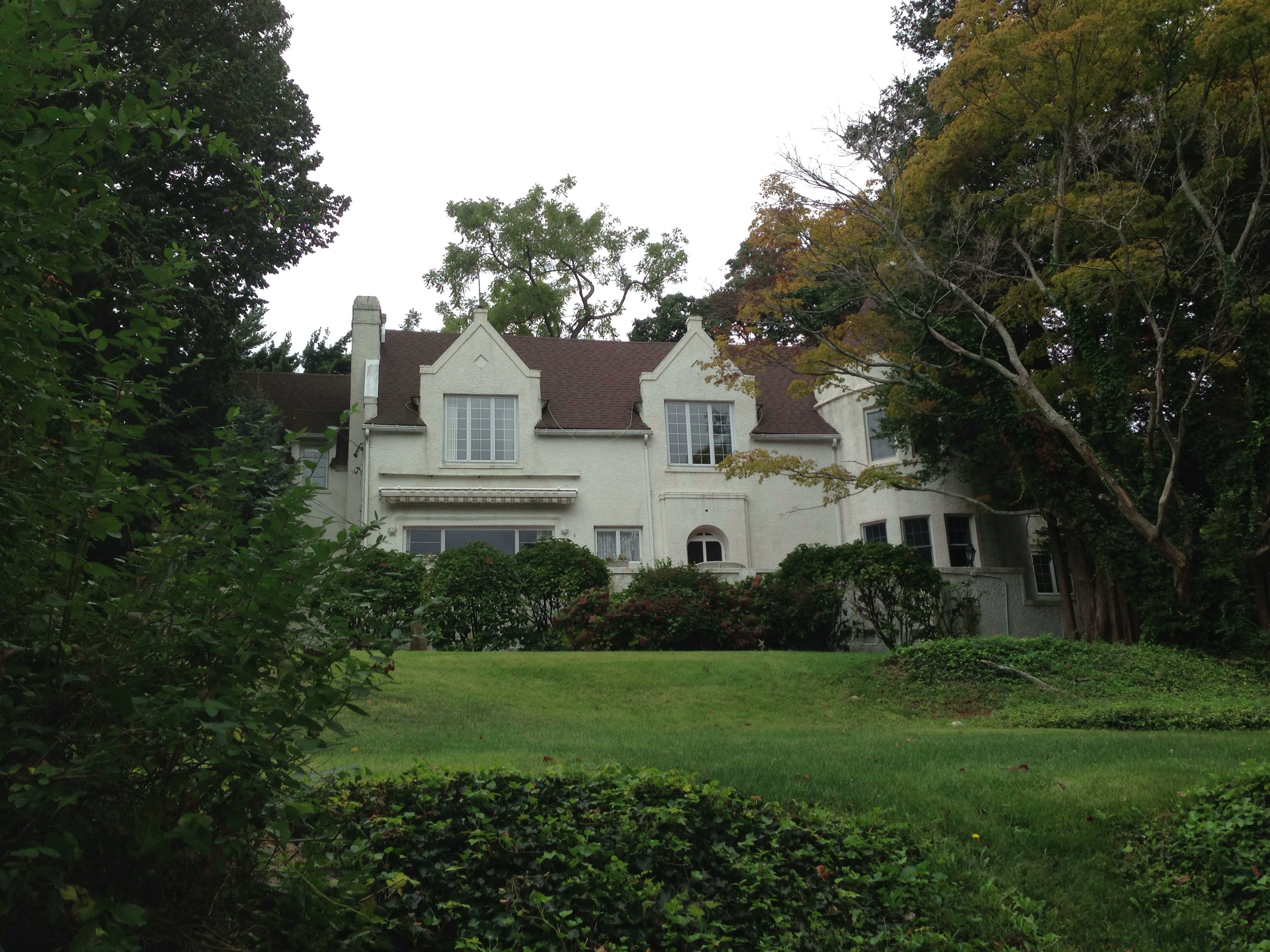
- House on Lower Drive

- Location within New York Location within the United States
- Location: Locust Ln., Upper & Lower Drs., Huntington Bay, New York
- Coordinates: 40°54′2″N 73°24′31″W
- Area: 3 acres (1.2 ha)
- Architectural style: Tudor Revival, Mission/Spanish Revival
- MPS: Huntington Town MRA
- NRHP reference No.: 85002489
- Added to NRHP: September 26, 1985

Beaux Arts Park Historic District is a national historic district located at Huntington Bay in Suffolk County, New York. The district has nine contributing buildings and one contributing structure. It is a concentrated residential community with five large stucco residences in the Tudor Revival and Spanish Revival styles dated from about 1905 to 1915.

It was added to the National Register of Historic Places in 1985.
