= Halsey Estate-Tallwood =

Historic house in New York, United States

- U.S. National Register of Historic Places
- Location within New York Location within the United States
- Location: Sweet Hollow Rd., West Hills, New York
- Coordinates: 40°49′32″N 73°25′53″W
- Area: 12.8 acres (5.2 ha)
- Built: 1925
- Architectural style: Colonial Revival
- MPS: Huntington Town MRA
- NRHP reference No.: 85002527
- Added to NRHP: September 26, 1985

Halsey Estate-Tallwood is a historic home located at West Hills in Suffolk County, New York, known locally as "Tallwood" but more formally known as the "Halsey Estate". It was built in 1925 and is a symmetrically arranged, 22-bay shingled residence with a central block and a series of either gable or gambrel roofs and varies in height from 1 1/2 stories to 2 1/2 stories. The central 2 1/2-story block is five bays wide and has a gambrel roof. It is representative of the Colonial Revival style. Its builder, Richard Townley Haines Halsey, was a partner in Teff, Halsey and Company, brokers, and W. J. Sloane Company. It has been used since the 1970s as a children's day camp.

It was added to the National Register of Historic Places in 1985.
