= Bowes House =

Historic house in New York, United States

- U.S. National Register of Historic Places
- Location within New York Location within the United States
- Location: 15 Harbor Hill Rd., Huntington Bay, New York
- Coordinates: 40°54′2″N 73°25′28″W
- Area: 1 acre (0.40 ha)
- Built: 1899
- Architectural style: Shingle Style
- MPS: Huntington Town MRA
- NRHP reference No.: 85002492
- Added to NRHP: September 26, 1985

Bowes House is a historic home located at Huntington Bay in Suffolk County, New York. It was built in 1899 and is a 2 1/2-story, four-bay shingled gable roofed residence in the Shingle Style. A recessed porch on flared Doric order columns wraps around the first floor.

It was added to the National Register of Historic Places in 1985.
