= Fort Golgotha and the Old Burial Hill Cemetery =

Historic cemetery in New York, United States

- U.S. National Register of Historic Places
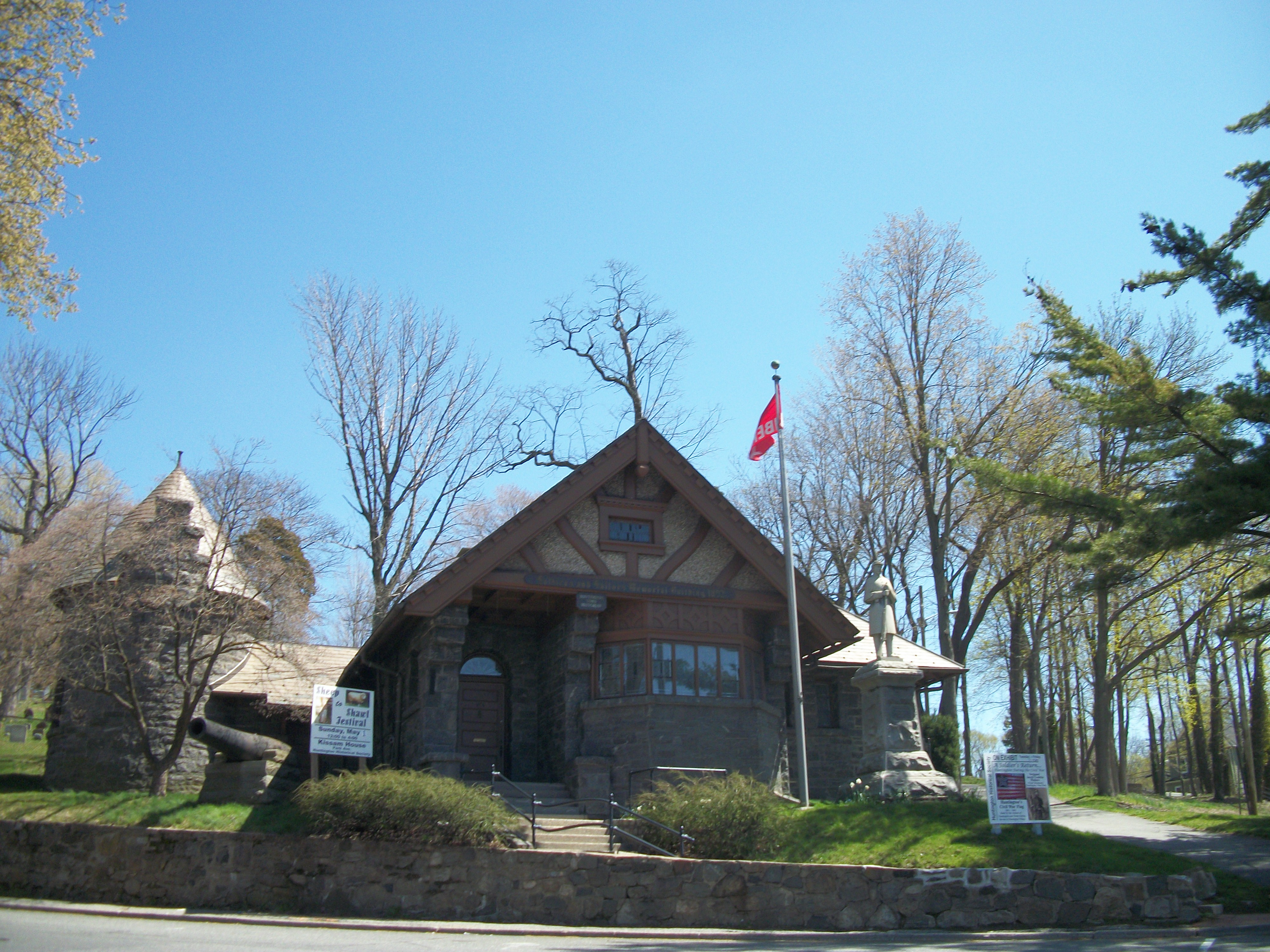
- The Soldiers and Sailors Memorial Building at Fort Golgotha.

- Location within New York Location within the United States
- Location: Main St. and Nassau Rd., Huntington, New York
- Coordinates: 40°52′17″N 73°25′26″W
- Area: 2.5 acres (1.0 ha)
- Built: 1782
- Architect: Col. Benjamin Thompson
- NRHP reference No.: 81000415
- Added to NRHP: March 2, 1981

Fort Golgotha and the Old Burial Hill Cemetery is the site of an historic cemetery, officially known as the "Old Burying Ground", and the location of a former Revolutionary War-era fort, known as Fort Golgotha, at Main Street (NY 25A) and Nassau Road in Huntington, New York. It is located in the Old Town Green Historic District and Old Town Hall Historic District.

The notorious fort, which takes its name from Golgotha, was built by the King's American Dragoons in 1782 on orders of Colonel Benjamin Thompson, commander of the regiment, on the site of the town burial ground. The nearby Presbyterian Church was destroyed, and its timbers used in the fort's construction, along with wood from local fruit orchards and local barns. Over 100 gravestones were removed from the burial ground to be used for flooring, fireplaces, and ovens.

The fort was one of a network of British fortifications in and around Huntington. East of town there was a larger fortification on the site later known as Gallows Hill, now known as "Fort Hill", Fort Slongo (now known as Fort Salonga) even further to the east, and Fort Franklin to the north on Lloyd Neck. After all British forces withdrew from the region in 1783, the fort was dismantled, the burial grounds restored and the Presbyterian Church rebuilt. The site was added to the National Register of Historic Places in 1981.
