= Charles Geoghegan House =

Historic house in New York, United States

- U.S. National Register of Historic Places
- Location within New York Location within the United States
- Location: 9 Harbor Hill Rd., Huntington Bay, New York
- Coordinates: 40°54′7″N 73°25′23″W
- Area: 1.5 acres (0.61 ha)
- Built: 1915
- Architectural style: Queen Anne, Shingle Style
- MPS: Huntington Town MRA
- NRHP reference No.: 85002524
- Added to NRHP: September 26, 1985

Charles Geoghegan House is a historic home located at Huntington Bay in Suffolk County, New York. It was built in 1915 and is a large, 2 1/2-story, eight-bay, clapboard and shingle-sheathed gable-roofed residence in the Shingle Style. Also on the property is the building containing the original garage / servant's quarters.

It was added to the National Register of Historic Places in 1985.
