= A. P. W. Kennan House =

Historic house in New York, United States

- U.S. National Register of Historic Places
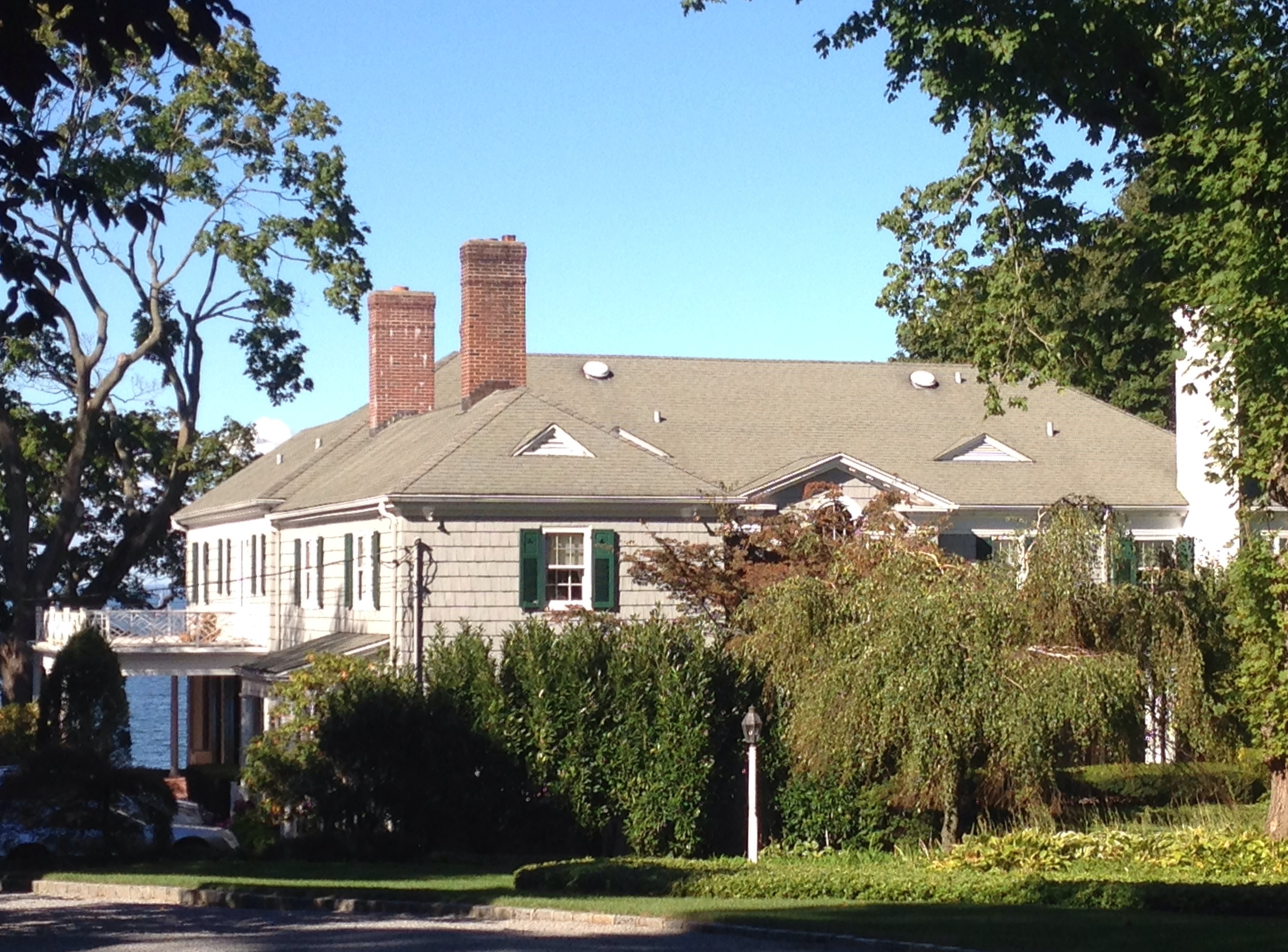

- Location within New York Location within the United States
- Location: Sydney Rd., Huntington Bay, New York
- Coordinates: 40°54′10″N 73°24′40″W
- Area: 2.2 acres (0.89 ha)
- Built: 1900
- Architectural style: Colonial Revival
- MPS: Huntington Town MRA
- NRHP reference No.: 85003502
- Added to NRHP: November 06, 1985

A. P. W. Kennan House is a historic home located at Huntington Bay in Suffolk County, New York. It was built about 1900 and is a large, 2 1/2-story, L-shaped, shingled, hip-roofed dwelling. It features a gable-roofed pavilion on the east side and a massive second floor Palladian window. It is representative of the Colonial Revival style. Also on the property is the building containing the original garage / servant's quarters.

It was added to the National Register of Historic Places in 1985.
