= Harry Wood House =

Historic house in New York, United States

- U.S. National Register of Historic Places
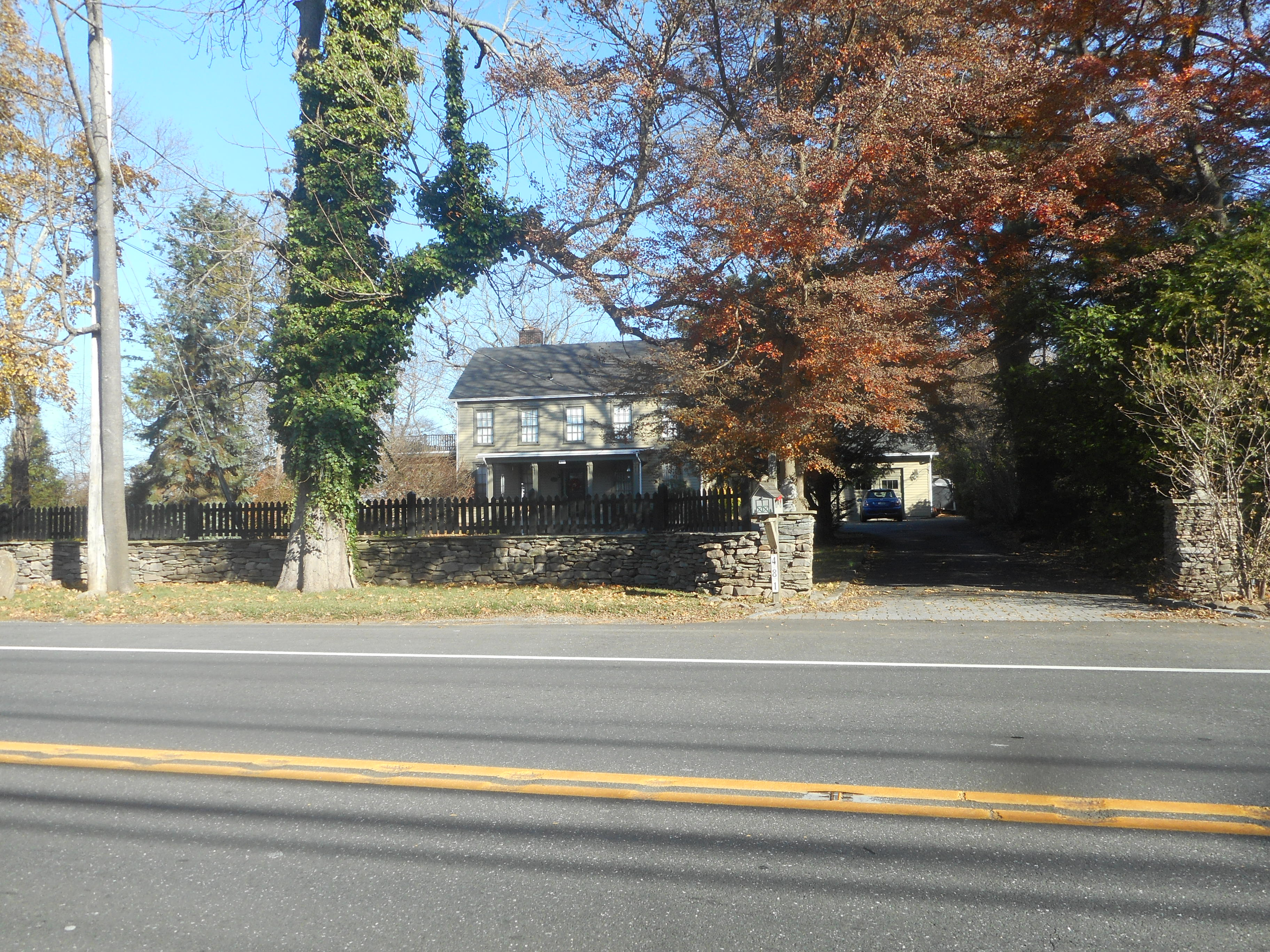
- View of the house from across NY 25A in November 2019.

- Location within New York Location within the United States
- Location: 481 West Main Street; Huntington, New York
- Coordinates: 40°52′28″N 73°26′27″W
- Area: 1 acre (0.40 ha)
- Built: 1853
- MPS: Huntington Town MRA
- NRHP reference No.: 85002553
- Added to NRHP: September 26, 1985

Harry Wood House is a historic home located at Huntington in Suffolk County, New York. It was built about 1853 and is a 2 1/2-story, five-bay, center-entrance plan dwelling with a gable roof and clapboard sheathing. The entrance features a transom and sidelights with a pent roof and balustraded porch.

It was added to the National Register of Historic Places in 1985.
