= John Oakley House =

Historic house in New York, United States

- U.S. National Register of Historic Places
- Location within New York Location within the United States
- Location: Sweet Hollow Rd., West Hills, New York
- Coordinates: 40°49′14″N 73°25′31″W
- Area: 18 acres (7.3 ha)
- Built: 1780
- Architect: Oakley family
- MPS: Huntington Town MRA
- NRHP reference No.: 85003501
- Added to NRHP: November 6, 1985

John Oakley House is a historic home located at West Hills in Suffolk County, New York. It is a 1 1/2-story, six-bay, gable-roofed dwelling with a 1-story, one-bay, gable-roofed west wing and one-bay, shed-roofed east wing. The original structure was built about 1720 and expanded in the 1780s.

It was added to the National Register of Historic Places in 1985.
