= C. A. O'Donohue House =

Historic house in New York, United States

- U.S. National Register of Historic Places
- Location within New York Location within the United States
- Location: 158 Shore Rd., Huntington Bay, New York
- Coordinates: 40°53′59″N 73°25′26″W
- Area: 4 acres (1.6 ha)
- Built: 1917
- Architect: O'Donohue, C. A.
- Architectural style: Colonial Revival
- MPS: Huntington Town MRA
- NRHP reference No.: 85002584
- Added to NRHP: September 26, 1985

The C. A. O'Donohue House is a historic house located at 158 Shore Road in Huntington Bay, Suffolk County, New York.

== Description and history ==
It was built in 1917, and is a massive, 2 1/2-story, three-bay wide, shingled gable-roofed dwelling with smaller flanking three-bay wings. It features a two-story portico with colossal Doric order columns and topped by a decorative balustrade. It is representative of the Colonial Revival style.

It was added to the National Register of Historic Places on September 26, 1985.
