= Bay Crest Historic District =

Historic district in New York, United States

- U.S. National Register of Historic Places
- U.S. Historic district
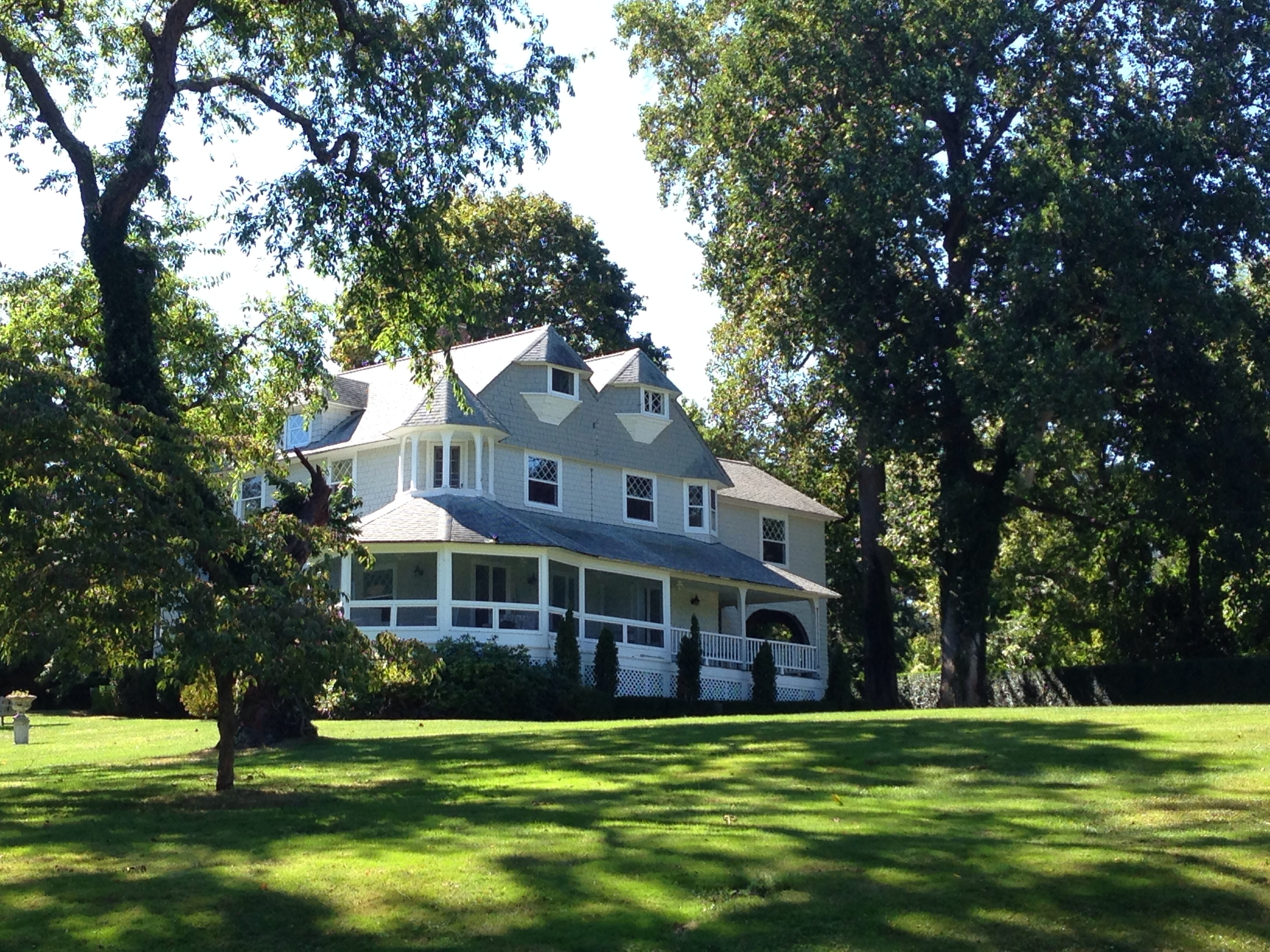
- A house in the Bay Crest Historic District in Huntington Bay

- Location within New York Location within the United States
- Location: Beech Ave., Valley Rd., Woodside & Valley Drs., Huntington Bay, New York
- Coordinates: 40°54′2″N 73°25′4″W
- Area: 16 acres (6.5 ha)
- Architectural style: Colonial Revival, Late Victorian
- MPS: Huntington Town MRA
- NRHP reference No.: 85002486
- Added to NRHP: September 26, 1985

Bay Crest Historic District is a national historic district located at Huntington Bay in Suffolk County, New York. The district has 21 contributing buildings. It is a concentrated residential community located along several short, narrow lanes and dated from about 1890 to 1905.

It was added to the National Register of Historic Places in 1985.
