= David Conklin House =

Historic house in New York, United States

- U.S. National Register of Historic Places
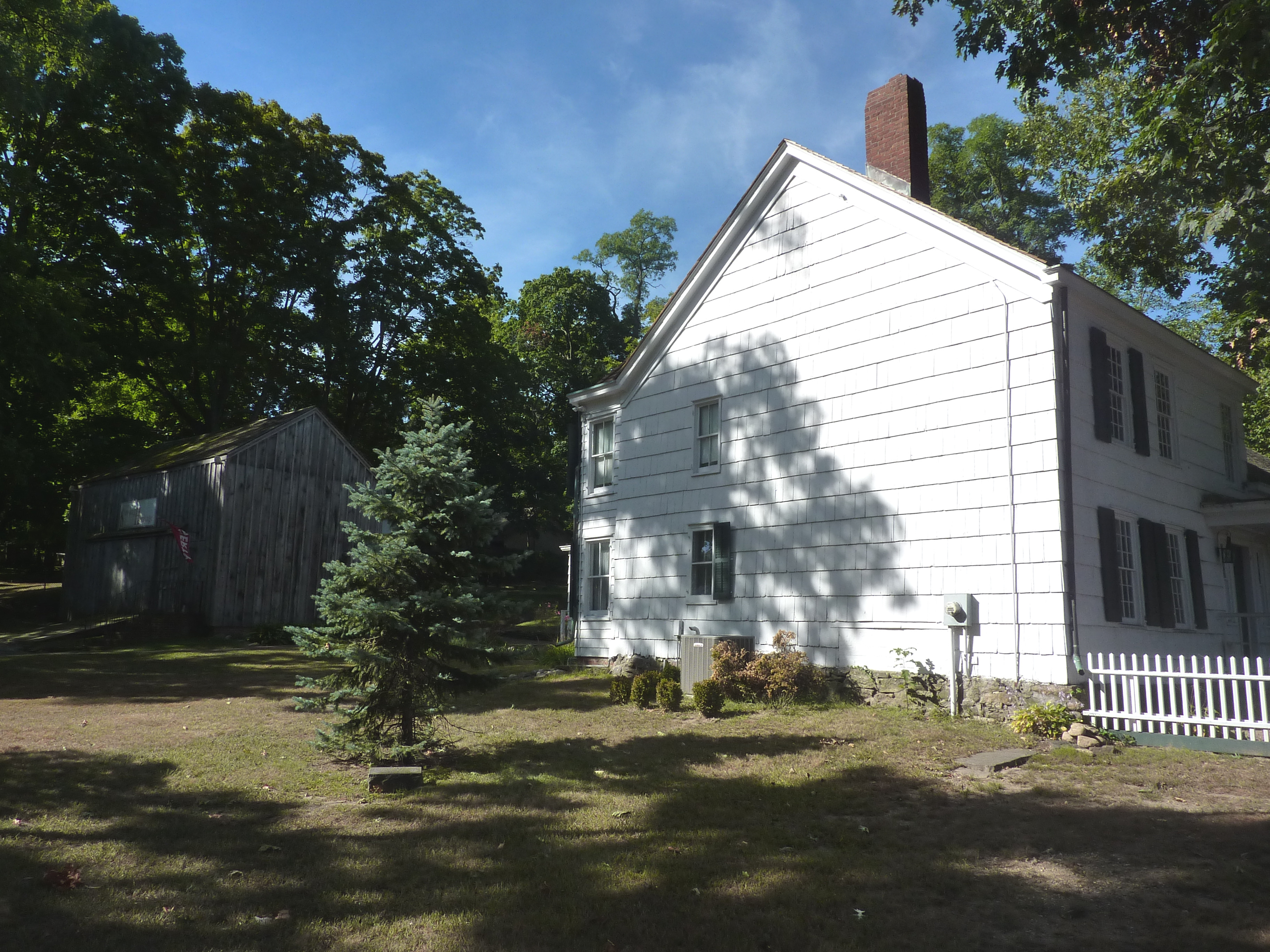

- Location within New York Location within the United States
- Location: 2 High Street, Huntington, New York
- Coordinates: 40°51′55″N 73°25′26″W
- Area: 0.8 acres (0.32 ha)
- Built: c. 1750
- Architect: Conklin, David
- MPS: Huntington Town MRA
- NRHP reference No.: 85002513
- Added to NRHP: September 26, 1985

The David Conklin House is a historic house located at Huntington in Suffolk County, New York, on the southwest corner of High Street (Suffolk CR 92) and New York Avenue (New York State Route 110).

== Description and history ==
It is a 2 1/2-story, three-bay wide, gable-roofed dwelling with a 1 1/2-story, five-bay gable-roofed east wing and a 2 1/2-story, five-bay hip-roofed southwest wing. The main and original portion was built in about 1750. Also on the property are a privy and well house. It is occupied by the Huntington Historical Society.

It was added to the National Register of Historic Places on September 26, 1985.
