= Wiggins-Rolph House =

Historic house in New York, United States

- U.S. National Register of Historic Places
- Location within New York Location within the United States
- Location: 518 Park Ave., Huntington, New York
- Coordinates: 40°52′18″N 73°24′37″W
- Area: less than one acre
- Built: 1848
- Architect: Wiggins, Dr.; Rolph, Jdg. Moses
- Architectural style: Greek Revival
- MPS: Huntington Town MRA
- NRHP reference No.: 85002551
- Added to NRHP: September 26, 1985

Wiggins-Rolph House is a historic home located at Huntington in Suffolk County, New York. It was built in 1848 and is a 2 1/2-story, five-bay shingled residence in the Greek Revival style. It has a modern 1-story south wing and modern 2-story north wing. It features a steeply pitched gable roof and paired interior end chimneys.

It was added to the National Register of Historic Places in 1985.
