= Gilsey Mansion =

Historic house in New York, United States

- U.S. National Register of Historic Places
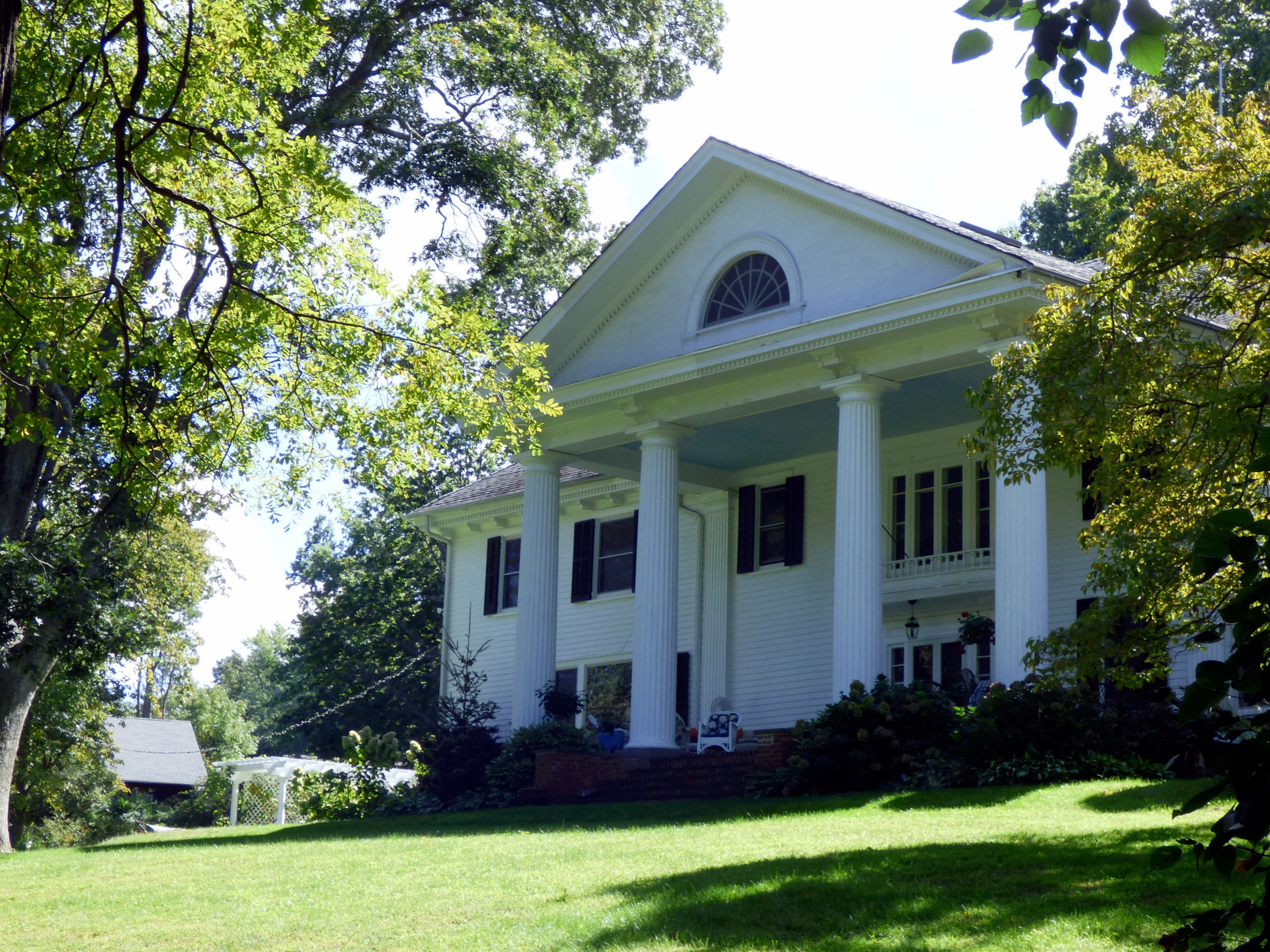

- Location within New York Location within the United States
- Location: 36 Browns Rd., Huntington, New York
- Coordinates: 40°53′39″N 73°26′7″W
- Area: 2 acres (0.81 ha)
- Built: 1900
- Architectural style: Colonial Revival
- MPS: Huntington Town MRA
- NRHP reference No.: 85002525
- Added to NRHP: September 26, 1985

Gilsey Mansion is a historic home located at Huntington in Suffolk County, New York. It is a large, seven-bay, two-story clapboard, T-shaped residence with a hipped roof, built about 1900 in the Colonial Revival style. A four-bay, two-story gable-roofed wing projects to the rear. It features a porte cochere on tapered Doric order columns and a pedimented portico.

It was added to the National Register of Historic Places in 1985.
