= N. Velzer House and Caretaker's Cottage =

Historic house in New York, United States

- U.S. National Register of Historic Places
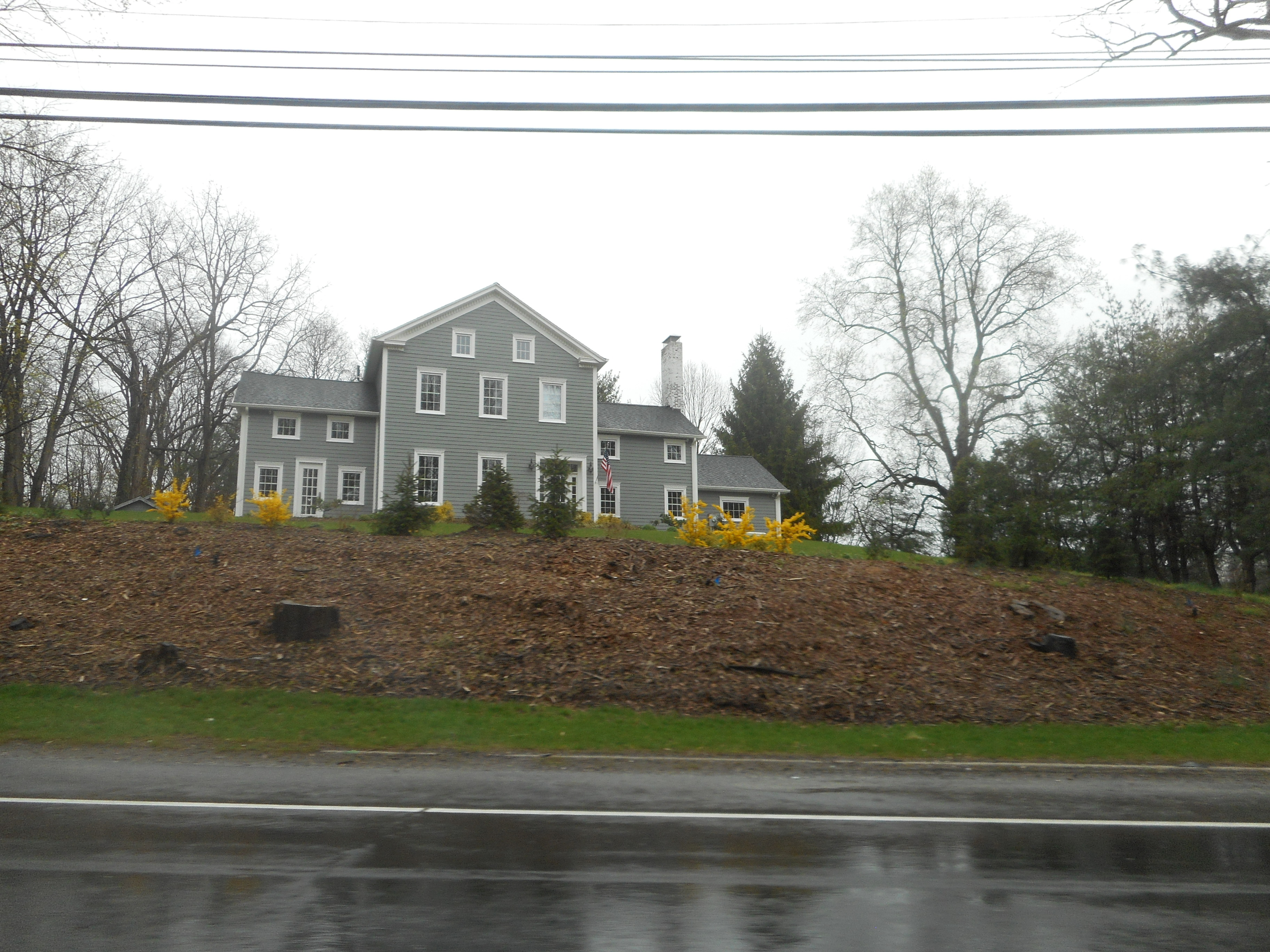
- The house at 22 Fort Salonga Road in April 2019.

- Location within New York Location within the United States
- Location: 22 Fort Salonga Rd. Centerport, New York
- Coordinates: 40°53′10″N 73°21′47″W
- Area: 2 acres (0.81 ha)
- Built: 1830
- Architectural style: Greek Revival, Vernacular Greek Revival
- MPS: Huntington Town MRA
- NRHP reference No.: 85002546
- Added to NRHP: September 26, 1985

N. Velzer House and Caretaker's Cottage is a historic home and cottage located at Centerport in Suffolk County, New York. The house is a 2 1/2-story, three-bay clapboard structure flanked by 1 1/2-story, two-bay, gable-roofed wings. It was built about 1830 and exhibits restrained Greek Revival details. The cottage is a 2 1/2-story, clapboard residence with a shallow gable roof and a three-bay, side-hall plan.

It was added to the National Register of Historic Places in 1985. The properties of the house and the cottage are divided by a private road leading to some condominiums.
