= Harbor Road Historic District =

Historic district in New York, United States

- U.S. National Register of Historic Places
- U.S. Historic district
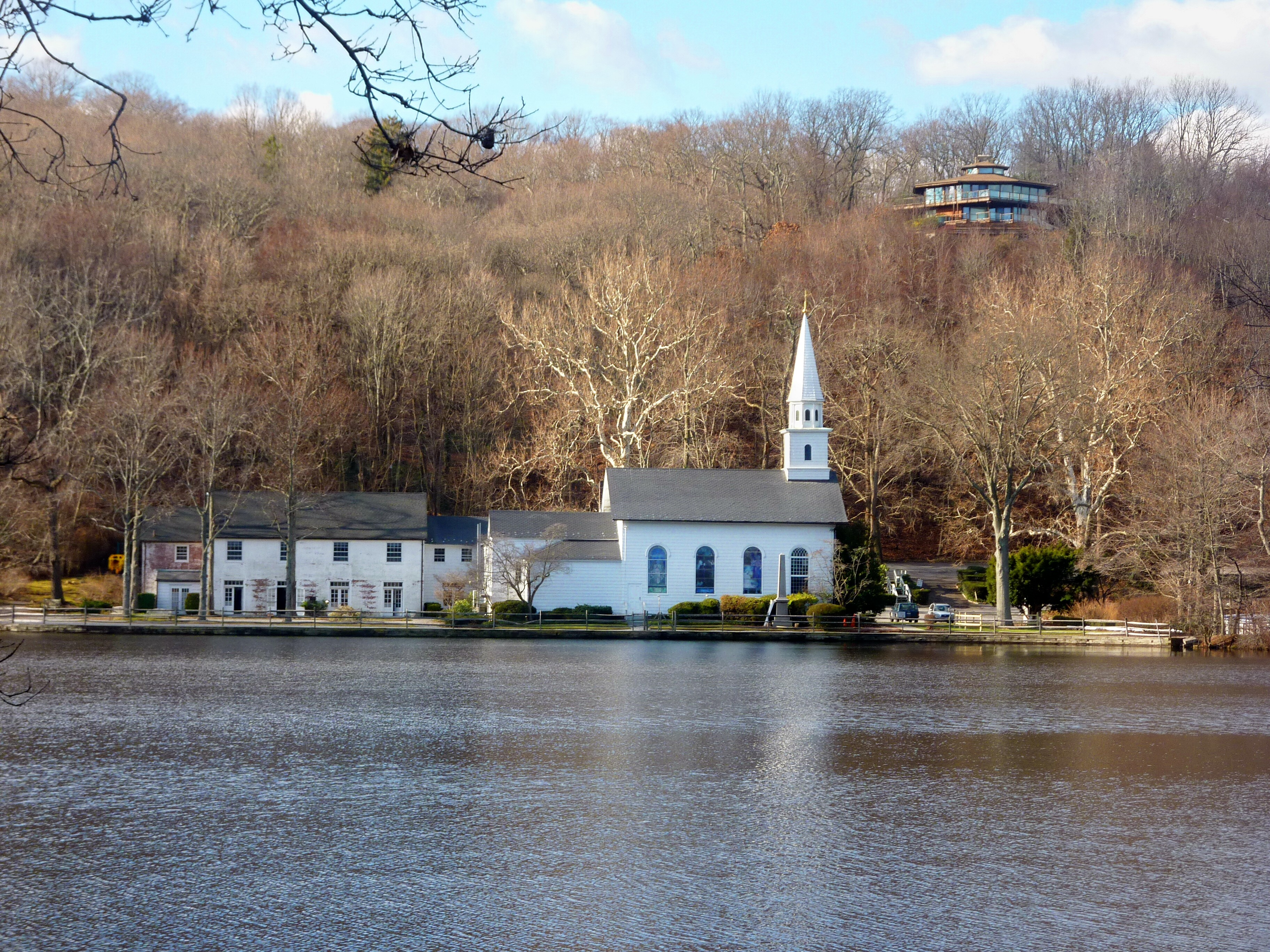

- Location within New York Location within the United States
- Location: Harbor Rd., Cold Spring Harbor, New York
- Coordinates: 40°51′34″N 73°27′43″W
- Area: 45 acres (18 ha)
- Architectural style: Greek Revival, Italianate, Federal
- MPS: Huntington Town MRA
- NRHP reference No.: 85002529
- Added to NRHP: September 26, 1985

Harbor Road Historic District is a national historic district located at Cold Spring Harbor in Suffolk County, New York. The district has 18 contributing residential buildings. The majority of the residences represent the village's earliest settlement. It also contains four residences from the mid-19th century when the village was a major whaling port.

It was added to the National Register of Historic Places in 1985.
