= John Harned House =

Historic house in New York, United States

- U.S. National Register of Historic Places
- Location within New York Location within the United States
- Location: 26 Little Neck Rd., Centerport, New York
- Coordinates: 40°53′16″N 73°21′55″W
- Area: less than one acre
- Built: c. 1850
- MPS: Huntington Town MRA
- NRHP reference No.: 85002530
- Added to NRHP: September 26, 1985

The John Harned House is a historic house located at 26 Little Neck Road in Centerport, Suffolk County, New York.

== Description and history ==
It consists of two 1 1/2-story, three-bay wide, gable-roofed sections built in about 1850. It has a shed-roofed porch on square columns and a central chimney. Also located on the property is a contributing late-19th-century barn.

It was added to the National Register of Historic Places on September 26, 1985.
