= Northport Veterans Administration Hospital Historic District =

- U.S. National Register of Historic Places
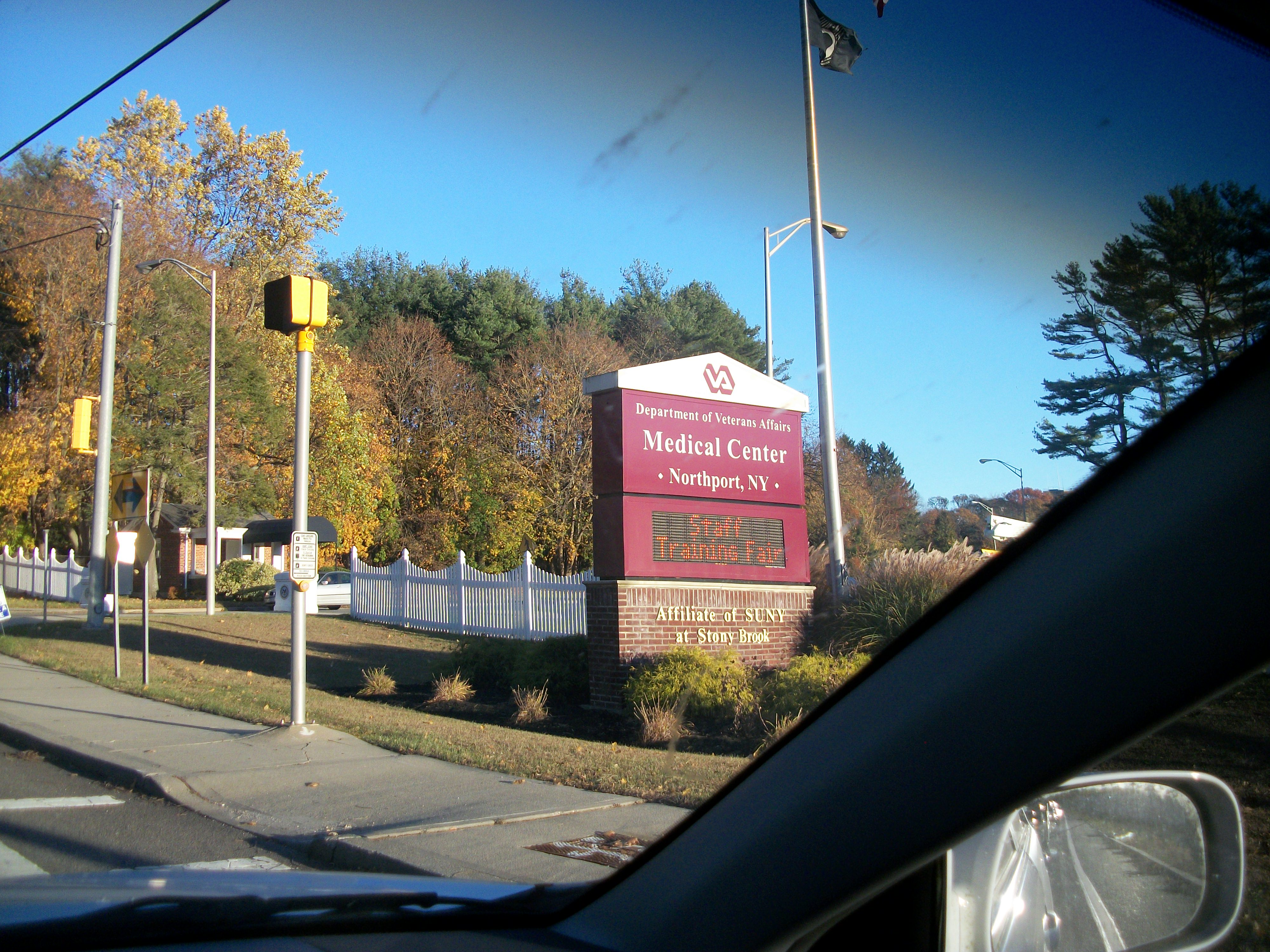
- VA Medical Center Sign, Northport, NY, November 2013

- Location within New York
- Location: 79 Middleville Rd., Northport, New York
- Coordinates: 40°53′52″N 73°18′48″W
- Area: 107 acres (43 ha)
- Built: 1931
- Architectural style: Colonial Revival, Classical Revival
- MPS: United States Second Generation Veterans Hospitals MPS
- NRHP reference No.: 12000312
- Added to NRHP: May 24, 2012

Northport Veterans Hospital Historic District is a historic hospital and national historic district located at Northport in Suffolk County, New York. The district encompasses 27 contributing buildings, 1 contributing site, and 1 contributing structure.

It was added to the National Register of Historic Places in 2012.
