= Charles Van Iderstine Mansion =

Historic house in New York, United States

- U.S. National Register of Historic Places
- Location within New York Location within the United States
- Location: Idle Day Dr., Centerport, New York
- Coordinates: 40°54′13″N 73°21′48″W
- Area: 1.5 acres (0.61 ha)
- Built: 1897
- Architectural style: Queen Anne
- MPS: Huntington Town MRA
- NRHP reference No.: 85002544
- Added to NRHP: September 26, 1985

Charles Van Iderstine Mansion is a historic home located at Centerport in Suffolk County, New York. It was built in 1897 and is a large, rambling 2 1/2-story clapboard, shingled and shiplap sided residence with a varied gable roof. It features a 3-story octagonal tower with a bell roof and a balustraded sleeping porch.

It was added to the National Register of Historic Places in 1985. In 2019, the house was placed for sale for $2,989,000.
