= John Bumpstead House =

Historic house in New York, United States

- U.S. National Register of Historic Places
- Location within New York Location within the United States
- Location: 473 Woodbury Rd., Cold Spring Harbor, New York
- Coordinates: 40°50′44″N 73°27′2″W
- Area: 2 acres (0.81 ha)
- Built: c. 1835
- Architect: John Bumpstead
- MPS: Huntington Town MRA
- NRHP reference No.: 85002499; 100006306 (decrease)

Significant dates
- Added to NRHP: September 26, 1985
- Boundary decrease: March 25, 2021

The John Bumpstead House is a historic house located at 473 Woodbury Road in Cold Spring Harbor, Suffolk County, New York.

== Description and history ==
It is a small, 1½-story clapboard dwelling with a shed roof side wing built in about 1835. Also on the property are a late-19th-century shed and barn.

It was added to the National Register of Historic Places on September 26, 1985.
