= N. J. Felix House =

Historic house in New York, United States

- U.S. National Register of Historic Places
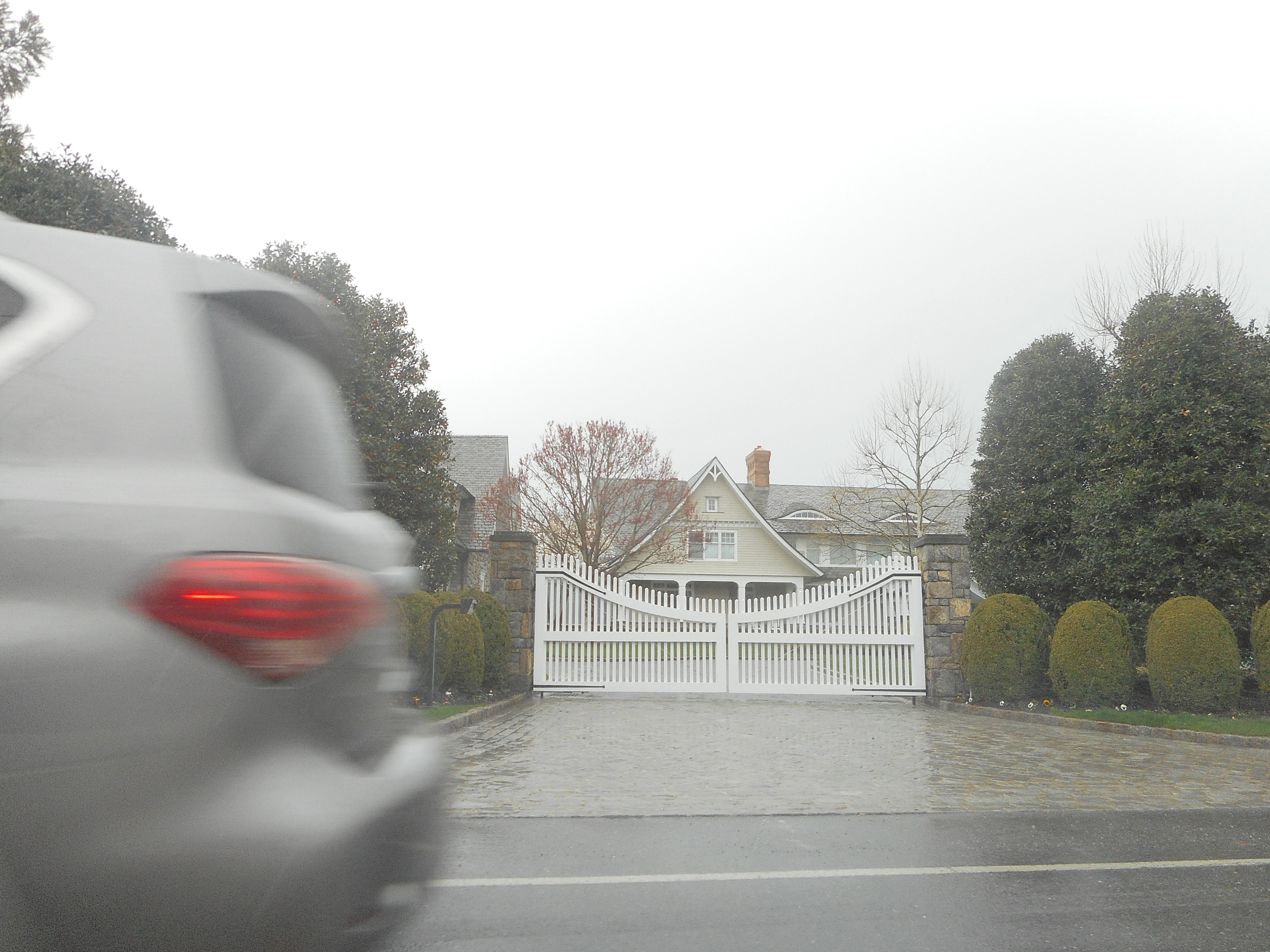
- The N.J. Felix House as taken on a rainy April day in 2019.

- Location within New York Location within the United States
- Location: 235 Asharoken Avenue, Asharoken, New York
- Coordinates: 40°55′41.2608″N 73°21′46.9116″W
- Area: 3.5 acres (1.4 ha)
- Built: 1900
- Architectural style: Colonial Revival, Queen Anne
- MPS: Huntington Town MRA
- NRHP reference No.: 85002523
- Added to NRHP: September 26, 1985

The N. J. Felix House is a historic home located in Asharoken, Suffolk County, New York. It was built about 1900 and is a 2 1/2-story, four-bay, shingled and clapboard residence with a steeply pitched hipped roof in an eclectic combination of the Queen Anne and Colonial Revival styles. It features two elongated decorative brick chimneys and gable dormers. It is a representative example of a large, upper-income single-family dwelling along Huntington's north shore. Also located on the property is a contributing privy.

It was added to the National Register of Historic Places in 1985.
