= Dowden Tannery =

- U.S. National Register of Historic Places
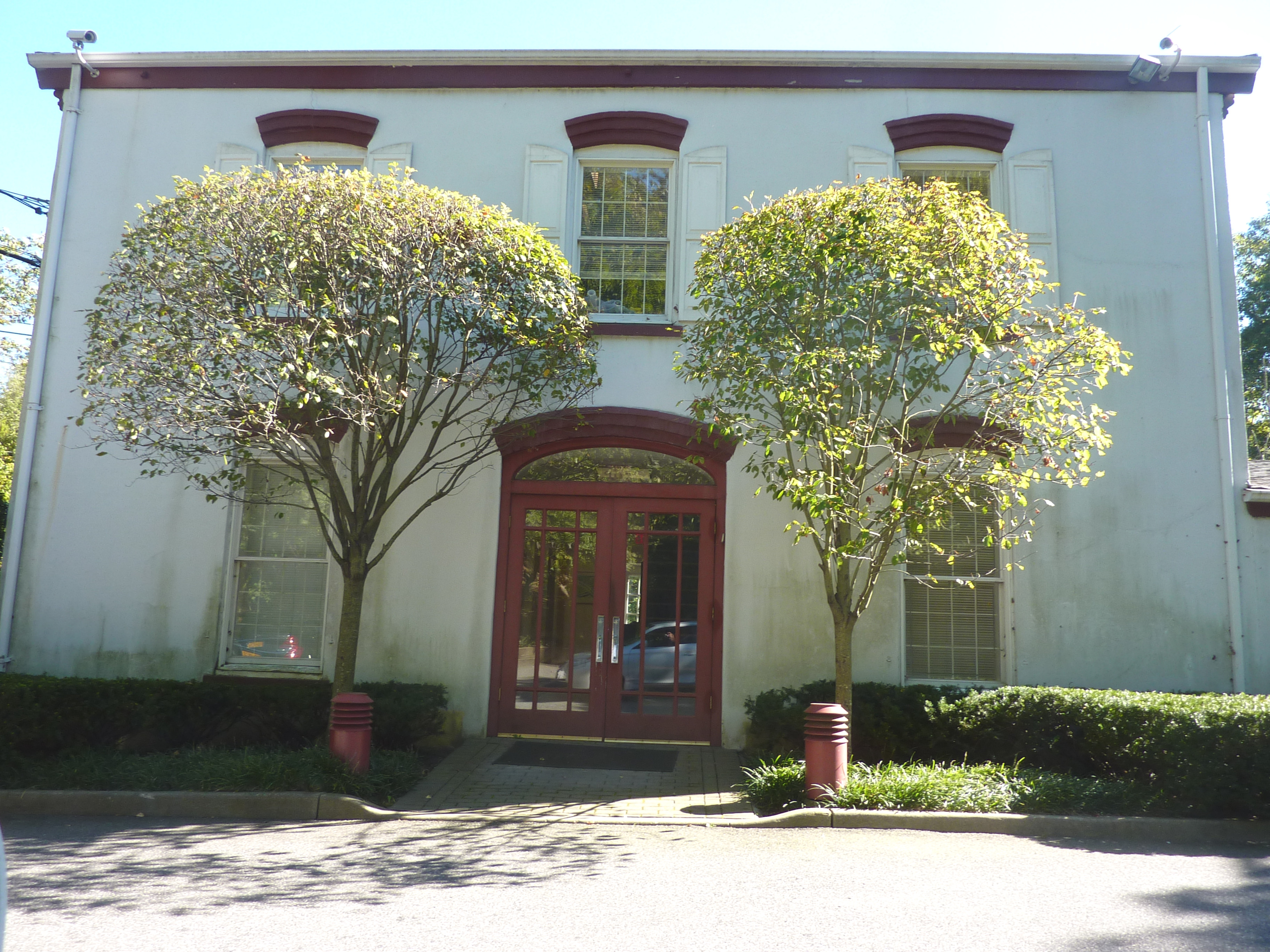

- Location within New York Location within the United States
- Location: 210 W. Rogues Path, Cold Spring Harbor, New York
- Coordinates: 40°50′16″N 73°26′58″W
- Area: 3 acres (1.2 ha)
- Built: 1840
- MPS: Huntington Town MRA
- NRHP reference No.: 85002519
- Added to NRHP: September 26, 1985

Dowden Tannery is a historic tannery building located at Cold Spring Harbor in Suffolk County, New York. It was built about 1840 and is a three bay, two story brick structure coated in stucco. Two, one story gable roofed side additions were built in the early 20th century. The tannery is located in a residential area southeast of Woodbury Road, and east of Cold Spring Harbor Railroad Station. Long Island Rail Road's Port Jefferson Branch runs behind the building, which is accessible only from a diagonal driveway leading from above the embankment of West Rogues Path.

It was added to the National Register of Historic Places in 1985.
