= House at 244 Park Avenue =

Historic house in New York, United States

- U.S. National Register of Historic Places
- Location within New York Location within the United States
- Location: 244 Park Ave., Huntington, New York
- Coordinates: 40°52′47″N 73°25′5″W
- Area: 0.5 acres (0.20 ha)
- Built: 1830
- MPS: Huntington Town MRA
- NRHP reference No.: 85002534
- Added to NRHP: September 26, 1985

House at 244 Park Avenue is a historic home located at Huntington in Suffolk County, New York. It is a four bay, saltbox profile dwelling with clapboard sheathing and a brick foundation. It was built about 1830 and features a shed roof porch on square columns. The house is located on the southwest corner of Park Avenue and Mill Lane across from the Huntington Hospital Parking Garage.

It was added to the National Register of Historic Places in 1985.
