= Cold Spring Harbor Library =

- U.S. National Register of Historic Places
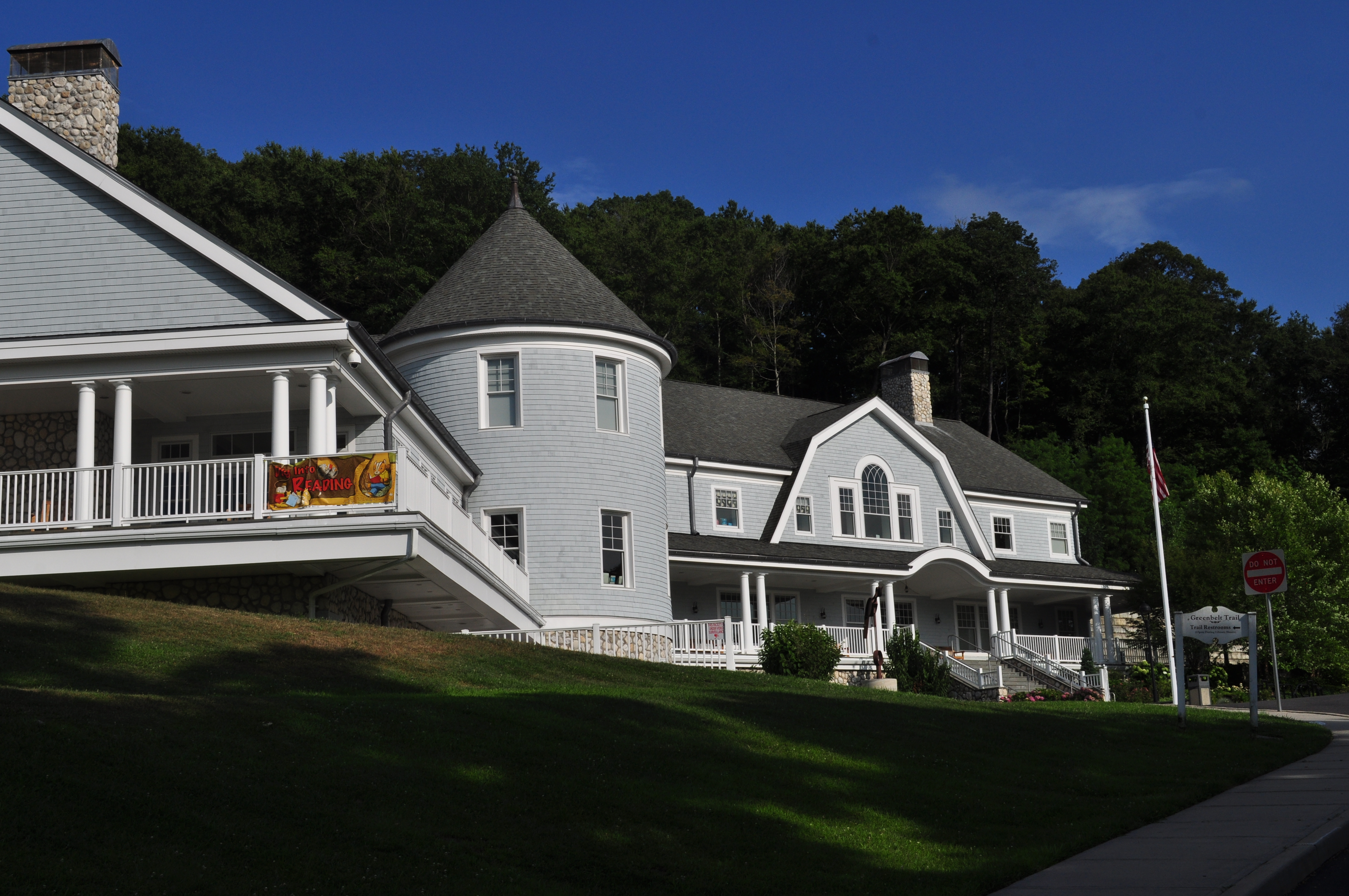
- Cold Spring Harbor Library (2013)

- Location within New York Location within the United States
- Location: 95 Harbor Road., Cold Spring Harbor, New York
- Coordinates: 40°52′20″N 73°27′40″W
- Area: 0.8 acres (0.32 ha)
- Built: 1913
- Architect: Peabody, Julian; Holmes, Edward
- Architectural style: Classical Revival
- MPS: Huntington Town MRA
- NRHP reference No.: 85002509
- Added to NRHP: September 26, 1985

The Cold Spring Harbor Library & Environmental Center is located at Cold Spring Harbor in Suffolk County, New York. It was founded as the Cold Spring Harbor Village Improvement Society in 1899. However, the library, consisting of a small collection of books, was first organized in 1886 and was housed at the Cutting House, 241 Harbor Road, Cold Spring Harbor. This building was located across the street from the local gristmill and the first librarian was the miller's wife, Mrs. Peter Waters. This building is now owned by the Cold Spring Harbor Laboratory.

== History ==
In the 1890s, the library was run by the operator of the local telegraph office, Annie Wright. It is not clear exactly where the library was located during this time period, but it is thought to have been housed at the Jones & Hewlett store, next to the mill. This building, 222 Harbor Road, is now also owned by the Cold Spring Harbor Laboratory.

In the late 1890s, the library was moved to Thespian Hall, a local venue for theatrical performances, lectures, and political meetings, located at the northeast corner of Harbor Road and Terrace Place. In 1896, this building became the Phoenix Fire Engine Company.

In 1896, the library moved to a more populated area near the intersection of Main Street and Shore Road. This was a small building which also served as the post office and telegraph office. It is now home to the Cold Spring Harbor Barbershop. Several years later, the library's collection of books were moved to what is now 117 Main Street.

In 1899, the Cold Spring Harbor Village Improvement Society was formed and in May 1899, adopted the Library as one of its activities. By this point in time, the library needed a larger and permanent building. Community donations made possible the construction of a building in 1913 which overlooked the harbor from the corner of Shore Road and Main Street in Cold Spring Harbor. It is a handsome, one story five bay brick building with a hipped roof in the Classical Revival style. It featured a decorative octagonal cupola atop the roof and the entrance had a pedimented portico supported by Doric order columns.

The library outgrew this space after about 60 years. The trustees of the library sold the building to the Society for the Preservation of Long Island Antiquities (Now known as Preservation Long Island) after which they rented a 7,000-square-foot (650 m^{2}) space from the Cold Spring Harbor School District in the East Side School building on Goose Hill Road. In 1999, the school district decided not to renew the lease.

In 2000, the library entered into an agreement with the New York State Office of Parks, Recreation and Historic Preservation for a long-term lease of five-acres of the newly created Cold Spring Harbor State Park. On August 9, 2006, the library moved into its current home at 95 Harbor Road, Cold Spring Harbor.
