= Charles Woodhull House =

Historic house in New York, United States

- U.S. National Register of Historic Places
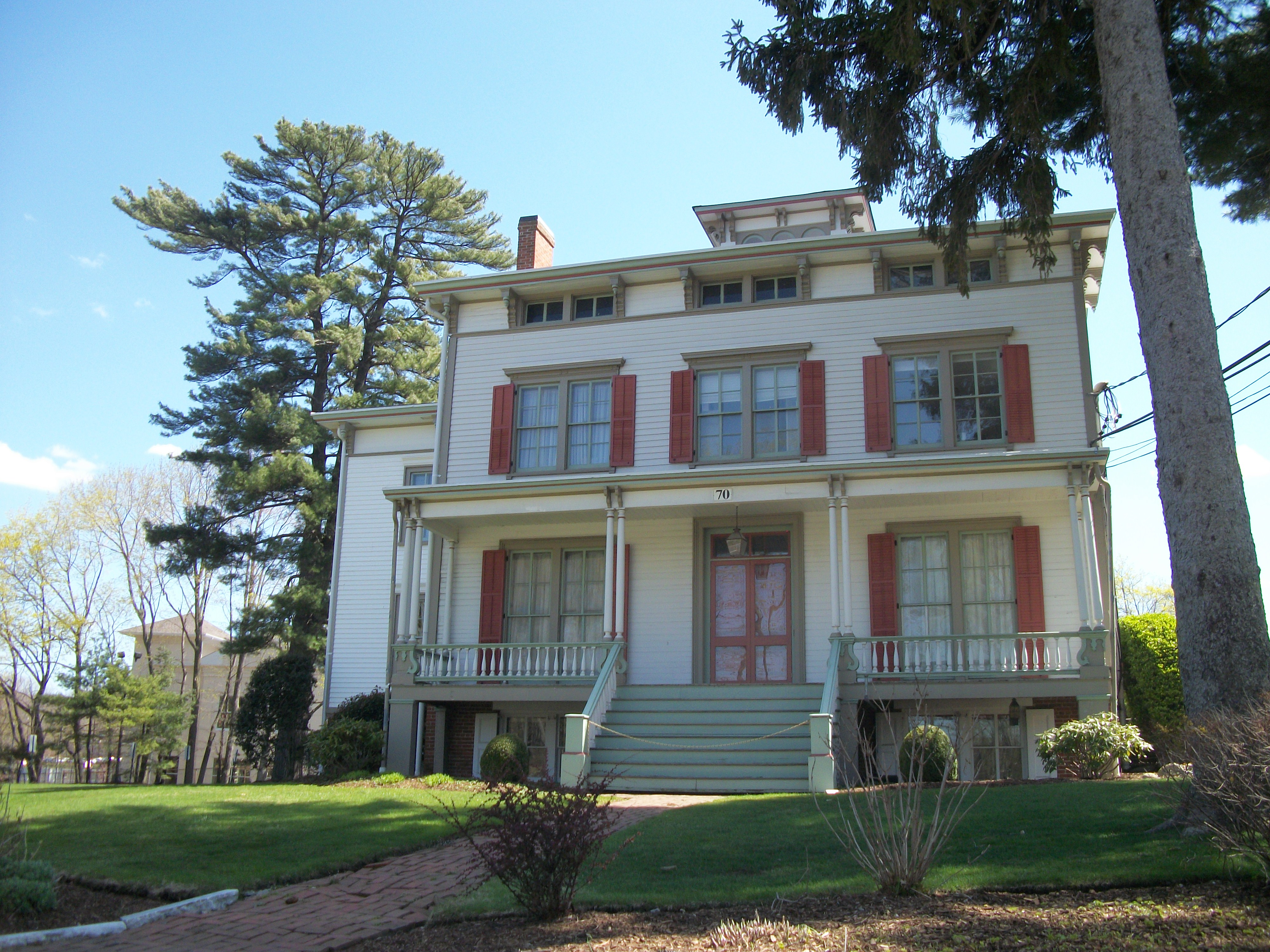
- Charles Woodhull House on NY 25A in Huntington

- Location within New York Location within the United States
- Location: 70 Main Street, Huntington, New York
- Coordinates: 40°52′28″N 73°25′5″W
- Area: 1 acre (0.40 ha)
- Built: 1870
- Architectural style: Italianate
- MPS: Huntington Town MRA
- NRHP reference No.: 85002564
- Added to NRHP: September 26, 1985

Charles Woodhull House is a historic home located on 70 West Main Street (NY Route 25A) in Huntington in Suffolk County, New York. It was built in 1870 and is a 2 1/2-story, three-bay clapboard residence with a low gable roof and brick foundation. It features a cupola and paired interior end chimneys. The entrance features a shed-roofed front porch supported by slender paired Doric order columns.

It was added to the National Register of Historic Places in 1985. The house is currently commercial real estate and has various professional tenants occupying the beautiful office suites. Richtberg and Rehberger Realty Co., LLC, is the property manager for this historical professional office building.
