= Goose Hill Road Historic District =

Historic district in New York, United States

- U.S. National Register of Historic Places
- U.S. Historic district
- Location within New York Location within the United States
- Location: Goose Hill Rd., Cold Spring Harbor, New York
- Coordinates: 40°52′40″N 73°27′6″W
- Area: 20 acres (8.1 ha)
- Architectural style: Greek Revival, Federal
- MPS: Huntington Town MRA
- NRHP reference No.: 85002528
- Added to NRHP: September 26, 1985

Goose Hill Road Historic District is a national historic district located at Cold Spring Harbor in Suffolk County, New York. The district has 11 contributing buildings. It is a small agrarian enclave situated along both sides of a narrow, winding road. The dwellings date from the late 18th to mid-19th century.

It was added to the National Register of Historic Places in 1985.
