= William Wooden Wood House =

Historic house in New York, United States

- U.S. National Register of Historic Places
- Location within New York Location within the United States
- Location: 90 Preston St., Huntington, New York
- Coordinates: 40°53′20″N 73°25′34″W
- Area: 1.5 acres (0.61 ha)
- Built: 1868; 158 years ago
- Architectural style: Picturesque
- MPS: Huntington Town MRA
- NRHP reference No.: 85002555
- Added to NRHP: September 26, 1985

William Wooden Wood House is a historic home located at Huntington in Suffolk County, New York. It was built in 1868 and is a 2 1/2-story, three-bay clapboard residence with a 2 1/2-story, four-bay clapboard west wing. The roof features a major gambrel cross-gable with round arched window, wooden ccrsting and finials at the ridge line and two interior end chimneys. It was added to the National Register of Historic Places in 1985.
