= M. Baylis House =

Historic house in New York, United States

- U.S. National Register of Historic Places
- Location within New York Location within the United States
- Location: 530 Sweet Hollow Rd., Melville, New York
- Coordinates: 40°47′24″N 73°25′2″W
- Area: 0.5 acres (0.20 ha)
- Built: c. 1820
- MPS: Huntington Town MRA
- NRHP reference No.: 85002487
- Added to NRHP: September 26, 1985

The M. Baylis House is a historic house located at 530 Sweet Hollow Road in Melville, Suffolk County, New York.

== Description and history ==
It was built in approximately 1820 and is a 1 1/2-story, five-bay wide dwelling with a saltbox profile.

It was added to the National Register of Historic Places on September 26, 1985.
