= Henry Townsend House =

Historic house in New York, United States

- U.S. National Register of Historic Places
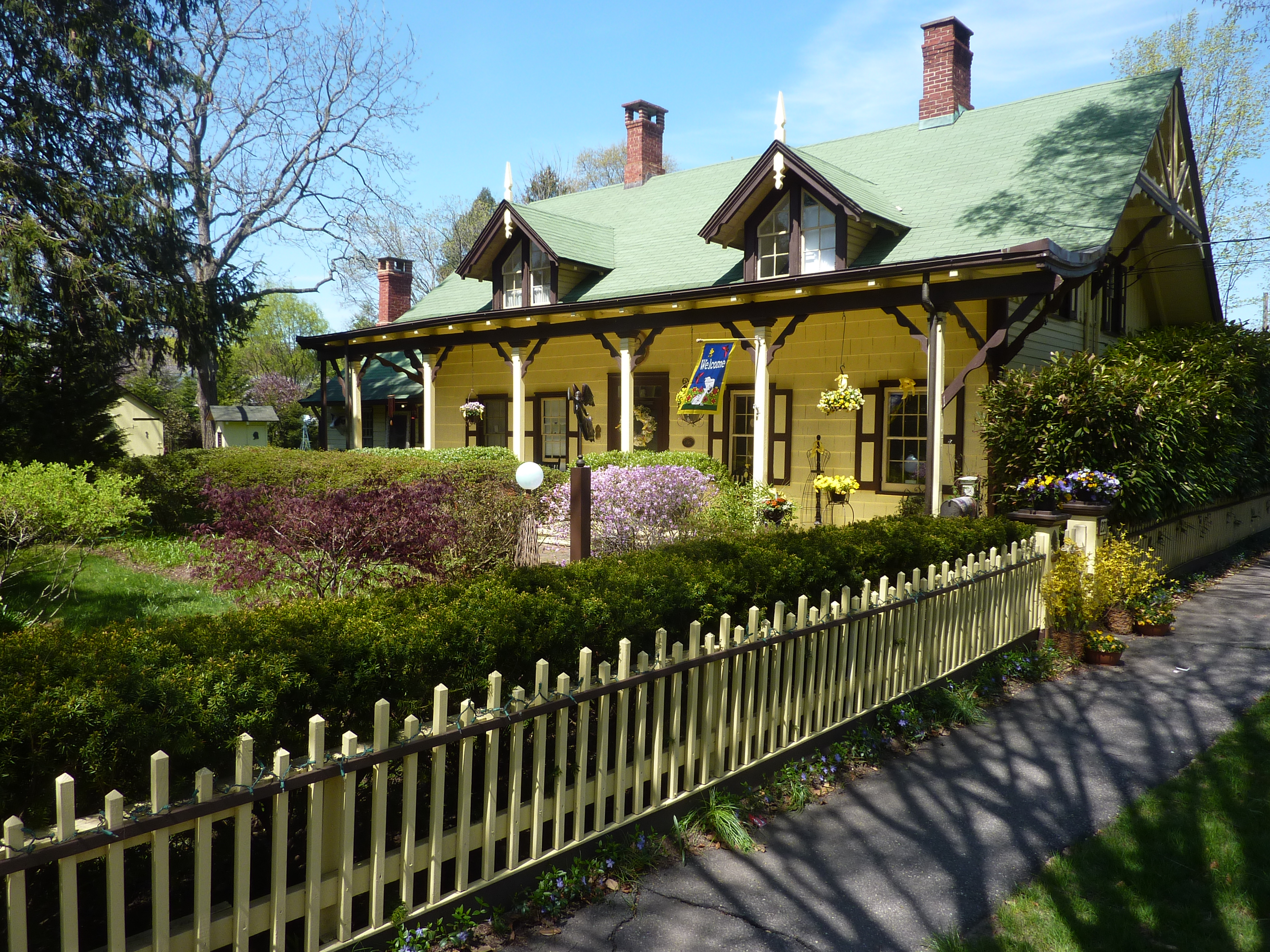

- Location within New York Location within the United States
- Location: 231 W. Neck Rd. Huntington, New York
- Coordinates: 40°55′33″N 73°26′12″W
- Area: 1.5 acres (0.61 ha)
- Built: ca. 1830
- Architect: Townsend, Henry
- MPS: Huntington Town MRA
- NRHP reference No.: 85002543
- Added to NRHP: September 26, 1985

Henry Townsend House is a historic home located at Huntington in Suffolk County, New York. It is a 1 1/2-story, five-bay, center-entrance clapboard-and-shingle dwelling built about 1830. It has a two-bay, 1-story side wing. Also on the property is a privy, smokehouse, well, shed, and garage.

It was added to the National Register of Historic Places in 1985.
