= Seaman Farm =

Historic house in New York, United States

- U.S. National Register of Historic Places
- Location within New York Location within the United States
- Location: 1378 Carlls Straight Path, Dix Hills, New York
- Coordinates: 40°48′37″N 73°19′11″W
- Area: 16 acres (6.5 ha)
- Built: 1805
- MPS: Huntington Town MRA
- NRHP reference No.: 85002575
- Added to NRHP: September 26, 1985

Seaman Farm was a historic home and farm complex located at Dix Hills in Suffolk County, New York. The main dwelling was built about 1805 and is a 1 1/2-story, shingled dwelling with a saltbox profile. It has a five-bay, center entrance main facade. Also on the property are two barns, a corncrib, three sheds, and a well structure.

It was added to the National Register of Historic Places in 1985. The site was left abandoned since 1992, whereupon the barns deteriorated into collapse. The house was permitted to be demolished in 1995.
