= Huntington (CDP), New York =

Huntington, New York
- Hamlet and census-designated place Town Seat of the Town of Huntington
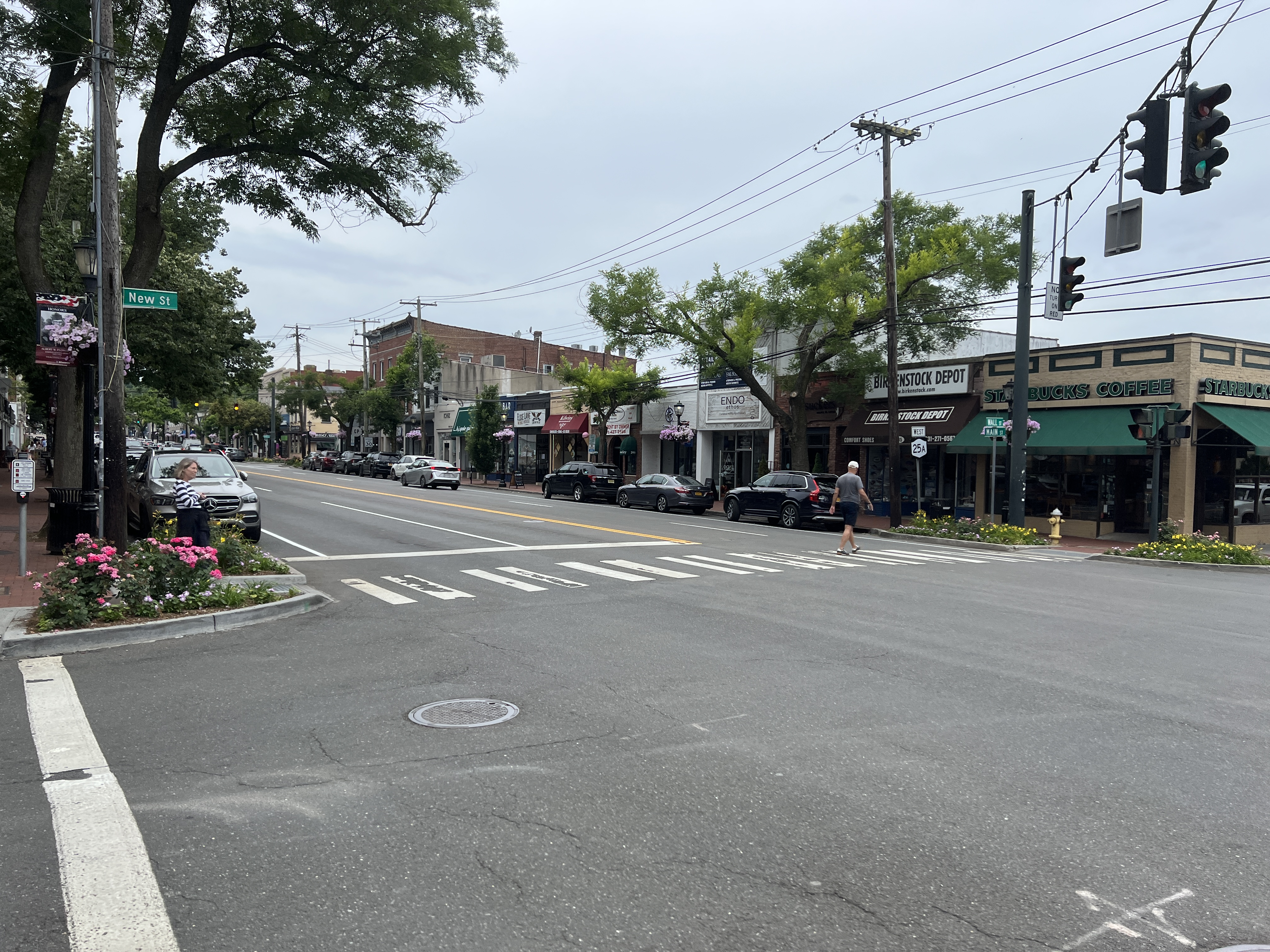
- NY 25A in downtown Huntington in 2022
- Nicknames: "Huntington Village"; "Downtown Huntington"
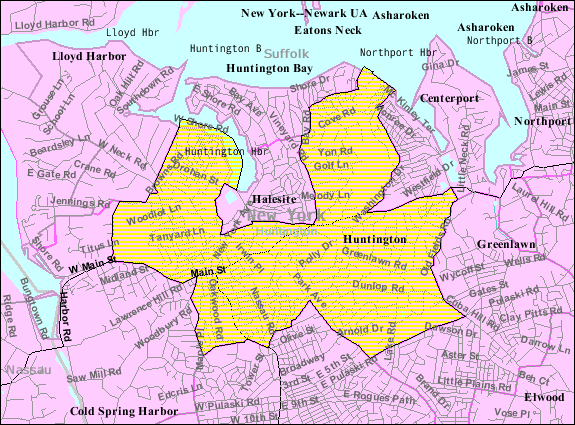
- U.S. Census map of Huntington

- Location on Long Island Location within the state of New York
- Coordinates: 40°52′40″N 73°24′49″W
- Country: United States
- State: New York
- County: Suffolk
- Town: Huntington

Area
  - Total: 7.79 sq mi (20.18 km^{2})
  - Land: 7.64 sq mi (19.79 km^{2})
  - Water: 0.15 sq mi (0.39 km^{2})
- Elevation: 75 ft (23 m)

Population (2020)
  - Total: 19,645
  - Density: 2,571.4/sq mi (992.82/km^{2})
- Demonym: Huntingtonian
- Time zone: UTC-5 (EST)
  - Summer (DST): UTC-4 (EDT)
- ZIP code: 11743
- Area codes: 631, 934
- FIPS code: 36-36233
- GNIS feature ID: 0953488

Huntington is a hamlet and census-designated place (CDP) located within the Town of Huntington in Suffolk County, on the North Shore of Long Island, in New York, United States. The population was 19,645 at the time of the 2020 census. The hamlet serves as the Town Seat of the Town of Huntington.

The hamlet's central business district, known locally as Huntington Village, is old and well developed, but it is not incorporated and does not have a village form of government.

== Geography ==
According to the United States Census Bureau, the CDP has a total area of 7.7 square miles (19.9 km^{2}), of which 7.5 square miles (19.5 km^{2}) is land and 0.1 square mile (0.4 km^{2}) – or 1.82% – is water.

The hamlet of Huntington is located 37 miles (59 km) northeast of Midtown Manhattan.

=== Greater Huntington Area ===
Huntington consists of two villages and five unincorporated hamlets:

- Huntington
- Huntington Bay
- Huntington Station
- South Huntington
- Cold Spring Harbor
- Lloyd Harbor
- Halesite

== Demographics ==
Historical population
Census	Pop.	Note	%±
2000	18,403		—
2010	18,406		0.0%
2020	19,645		6.7%
U.S. Decennial Census

At the 2000 census there were 18,403 people, 7,052 households, and 4,992 families in the CDP. The population density was 2,442.5 inhabitants per square mile (943.1/km^{2}). There were 7,273 housing units at an average density of 965.3 per square mile (372.7/km^{2}). The racial makeup of the CDP was 93.71% White, 2.09% Black or African American, 0.11% Native American, 1.80% Asian, 0.01% Pacific Islander, 1.14% from other races, and 1.13% from two or more races. Hispanic or Latino of any race were 3.58%.

Of the 7,052 households 31.7% had children under the age of 18 living with them, 60.7% were married couples living together, 7.2% had a female householder with no husband present, and 29.2% were non-families. 23.4% of households were one person and 8.8% were one person aged 65 or older. The average household size was 2.59 and the average family size was 3.08.

The age distribution was 23.1% under the age of 18, 4.9% from 18 to 24, 31.6% from 25 to 44, 26.2% from 45 to 64, and 14.1% 65 or older. The median age was 40 years. For every 100 females, there were 94.6 males. For every 100 females age 18 and over, there were 91.8 males.

The median household income was $82,934 and the median family income was $100,494. Males had a median income of $71,164 versus $45,027 for females. The per capita income for the CDP was $42,960. About 1.9% of families and 3.8% of the population were below the poverty line, including 3.2% of those under age 18 and 6.3% of those age 65 or over.

== Education ==
Huntington is located within the boundaries of (and is thus served by) the Cold Spring Harbor Central School District, the Harborfields Central School District, and the Huntington Union Free School District. As such, children who reside within the hamlet and attend public schools go to school in one of these three districts, depending on where they reside within the hamlet.

== Fire protection ==
Huntington is within the boundaries of the Greenlawn fire department, the Halesite fire department, and the Huntington fire department.

== Transportation ==
The village area is very walkable and is served by several bus routes. Suffolk County Transit's route 1 operates along Route 110 from Halesite to Amityville, while the H10, H20, and H30 (operated by Huntington Area Rapid Transit) serve different portions of the village. Routes 1, H10, and H20 all provide a direct connection to the Long Island Rail Road's hub at Huntington (the station itself is actually located in the adjacent hamlet of Huntington Station).
