= West Hills, New York =

- Hamlet and census-designated place
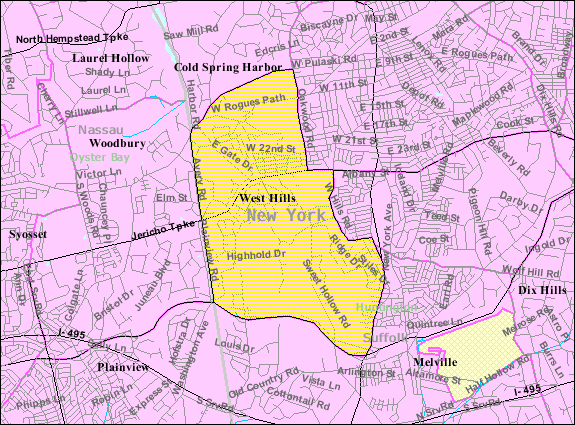
- U.S. Census map

- Location of West Hills within New York, U.S. West Hills (New York) West Hills (the United States)
- Coordinates: 40°49′27″N 73°26′4″W
- Country: United States
- State: New York
- County: Suffolk

Area
  - Total: 4.91 sq mi (12.71 km^{2})
  - Land: 4.91 sq mi (12.71 km^{2})
  - Water: 0 sq mi (0.00 km^{2})
- Elevation: 348 ft (106 m)

Population (2020)
  - Total: 5,385
  - Density: 1,097.4/sq mi (423.72/km^{2})
- Time zone: UTC-5 (Eastern (EST))
  - Summer (DST): UTC-4 (EDT)
- ZIP code: 11743
- Area code: 631
- FIPS code: 36-80258
- GNIS feature ID: 1802955

West Hills is a hamlet and census-designated place (CDP) in the Town of Huntington, Suffolk County, New York. As of the 2020 census, West Hills had a population of 5,385. Residents share a post office with the hamlet of Huntington but much earlier in its history, West Hills had its own post office, located on Jericho Turnpike (formerly Middle Post Road). Also, it is adjacent to the hamlet of Woodbury .

== Geography ==
According to the U.S. Census Bureau, the CDP has a total area of 4.9 square miles (13 km^{2}), all land.

West Hills County Park is the location of Jayne's Hill, the natural highest point on Long Island (400 feet; 120 m).

== Demographics ==
Historical population
Census	Pop.	Note	%±
2020	5,385		—
U.S. Decennial Census

As of the census of 2000, there were 5,607 people, 1,978 households, and 1,647 families residing in the CDP. The population density was 1,131.7 per square mile (437.0/km^{2}). There were 2,008 housing units at an average density of 405.3 per square mile (156.5/km^{2}). The racial makeup of the CDP was 94.40% White, 0.89% African American, 0.02% Native American, 3.41% Asian, 0.45% from other races, and 0.84% from two or more races. Hispanic or Latino of any race were 2.41% of the population.

There were 1,978 households, out of which 35.4% had children under the age of 18 living with them, 73.7% were married couples living together, 7.3% had a female householder with no husband present, and 16.7% were non-families. 13.0% of all households were made up of individuals, and 6.6% had someone living alone who was 65 years of age or older. The average household size was 2.83 and the average family size was 3.09.

In the CDP, the population was spread out, with 23.7% under the age of 18, 5.3% from 18 to 24, 28.1% from 25 to 44, 29.5% from 45 to 64, and 13.4% who were 65 years of age or older. The median age was 41 years. For every 100 females, there were 98.0 males. For every 100 females age 18 and over, there were 95.0 males.

The median income for a household in the CDP was $87,295, and the median income for a family was $94,363. Males had a median income of $61,919 versus $45,134 for females. The per capita income for the CDP was $42,783. About 1.0% of families and 1.8% of the population were below the poverty line, including none of those under age 18 and 0.8% of those age 65 or over.

== Notable people ==
- Francis T. P. Plimpton, U.S. diplomat and attorney
- George Plimpton, author
- Henry L. Stimson, U.S. statesman
- Walt Whitman, poet

== See also ==
- Oheka Castle
