= Huntington Bay, New York =

- Village
- Incorporated Village of Huntington Bay
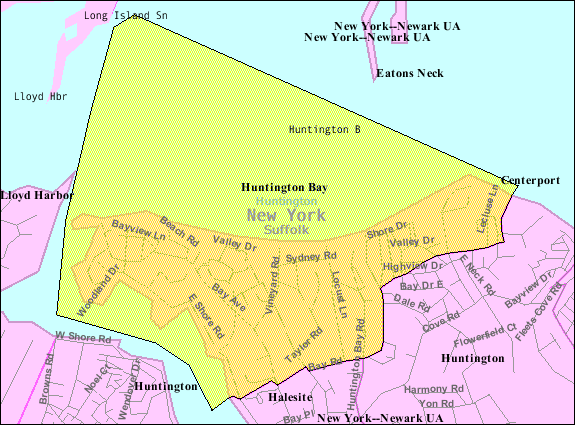
- U.S. Census map of Huntington Bay

- Location on Long Island Location within the state of New York Location within the contiguous United States
- Coordinates: 40°54′6″N 73°24′47″W
- Country: United States
- State: New York
- County: Suffolk
- Town: Huntington
- Incorporated: 1924

Government
  - Mayor: Mark Dara

Area
  - Total: 1.90 sq mi (4.91 km^{2})
  - Land: 1.00 sq mi (2.59 km^{2})
  - Water: 0.90 sq mi (2.32 km^{2})
- Elevation: 16 ft (5 m)

Population (2020)
  - Total: 1,446
  - Density: 1,449/sq mi (559.3/km^{2})
- Time zone: UTC-5 (Eastern (EST))
  - Summer (DST): UTC-4 (EDT)
- ZIP code: 11743
- Area codes: 631, 934
- FIPS code: 36-37022
- GNIS feature ID: 0953490
- Website: www.huntingtonbay.org

Huntington Bay is a village in the Town of Huntington in Suffolk County, on East Neck on the North Shore of Long Island, in New York, United States. As of the 2020 census, Huntington Bay had a population of 1,446. It is considered part of the greater Huntington area, which is anchored by Huntington.

== History ==
Huntington Bay incorporated as a village in 1924.

In 2000, the Village and the Huntington Yacht Club were involved in a legal dispute over proposals for added floating piers made by the latter party.

== Geography ==
According to the United States Census Bureau, the village has a total area of 1.9 square miles (4.9 km^{2}), of which 1.0 square mile (2.6 km^{2}) is land and 0.89 square miles (2.3 km^{2}), or 47.32%, is water.

== Demographics ==
Historical population
Census	Pop.	Note	%±
1930	357		—
1940	408		14.3%
1950	585		43.4%
1960	1,267		116.6%
1970	1,789		41.2%
1980	1,783		−0.3%
1990	1,521		−14.7%
2000	1,496		−1.6%
2010	1,425		−4.7%
2020	1,446		1.5%
U.S. Decennial Census

As of the Census of 2000, there were 1,496 people, 539 households, and 454 families residing in the village. The population density was 1,456.4 inhabitants per square mile (562.3/km^{2}). There were 560 housing units at an average density of 545.2 per square mile (210.5/km^{2}). The racial makeup of the village was 98.46% White, 0.94% Asian, 0.07% African American, and 0.53% from two or more races. Hispanic or Latino of any race were 1.27% of the population.

There were 539 households, out of which 33.4% had children under the age of 18 living with them, 75.9% were married couples living together, 5.4% had a female householder with no husband present, and 15.6% were non-families. 12.6% of all households were made up of individuals, and 8.2% had someone living alone who was 65 years of age or older. The average household size was 2.78 and the average family size was 3.02.

In the village, the population was spread out, with 23.7% under the age of 18, 5.6% from 18 to 24, 18.9% from 25 to 44, 35.4% from 45 to 64, and 16.4% who were 65 years of age or older. The median age was 46 years. For every 100 females, there were 98.4 males. For every 100 females age 18 and over, there were 95.4 males.

The median income for a household in the village was $151,816, and the median income for a family was $163,820. Males had a median income of $100,000 versus $55,893 for females. The per capita income for the village was $71,798. None of the families and 2.0% of the population were living below the poverty line, including no under eighteens and 2.9% of those over 64.

As of the 2020 census, there were 1,446 people. The racial makeup of the village was 90.46% White, 2.01% Asian, 0.35% Black, 0.07% American Indian, 1.80% were of some other race, and 5.32% were of two or more races.

== Government ==
As of July 2024, the Mayor of Huntington Bay is Mark Dara and the Village Trustees are Barbara Beuerlein, Luan Doan, Elizabeth Richter and Kenneth Anna.

=== Village police ===
The Village of Huntington Bay has its own police department, which provides the entirety of the village with police protection. The 2009-2010 police budget was $1,119,250.00 excluding personnel benefits and soft costs as per the 2024-2025 Adopted Budget.

=== Fire Department ===
The village is covered by the Halesite Fire Department.
