= List of museums on Long Island =

This list of museums on Long Island is a list of museums in Nassau County, New York and Suffolk County, New York. (Museums in the boroughs of Queens and Brooklyn, which are also physically located on Long Island, are found in List of museums in New York City). Museums that exist only in cyberspace (i.e., virtual museums) are not included. Also included are non-profit art centers and galleries.

== Museums ==
Name	$	Location	County	Type	Summary
1901 Depot and Freight house		Lindenhurst	Suffolk	Railroad	website Restored Lindenhurst depot, freight house, and various railroad equipment for show. Includes historical pictures of the local area.
African American Museum of Nassau County		Hempstead	Nassau	African American	History of African-Americans on Long Island and the African-American contribution to the social and cultural development of American society
Alan and Helene Rosenberg Jewish Discovery Museum		Commack	Suffolk	Ethnic – Jewish	website, part of the Suffolk Y JCC, Jewish life, history, values, traditions and heroes, as well as Israel and the Hebrew language
Amelia Cottage Museum		Amagansett	Suffolk	Local history	Operated by the Amagansett Historical Society
American Airpower Museum		East Farmingdale	Suffolk	Aviation	Features flying World War II aircraft manufactured by Republic Aviation
American Merchant Marine Museum		Kings Point	Nassau	Maritime	Marine art and artifacts, National Maritime Hall of Fame
Babylon Library Museum		Babylon	Suffolk	Local history	website, operated by the Babylon Village Historical and Preservation Society; Listed on NRHP since August 10, 2015
Baldwin Historical Museum		Baldwin	Nassau	Local history	website, operated by the Baldwin Historical Society
Bayport Aerodrome		Bayport	Suffolk	Aviation	Historic flying aircraft
Bayville Historical Museum		Bayville	Nassau	Local history	Facebook site, open by appointment
Bellport-Brookhaven Historical Society Museum Complex		Bellport	Suffolk	Open air	website, includes an 1833 house, blacksmith shop, boathouse, milk house, collections of Sperry gyroscopes, decoys, antique tools, wedding gowns, dolls and toys from the mid 1800s
Bohemia Historical Society Museum		Bohemia	Suffolk	Local history	website
Bridgehampton Museum		Bridgehampton	Suffolk	Local history	website, operated by the Bridgehampton Historical Society, will include the Nathaniel Rogers House
Brookhaven National Laboratory Science Learning Center		Brookhaven	Suffolk	Science	website
Brookhaven Volunteer Firefighters Museum		Ridge	Suffolk	Firefighting	website
Caleb Smith State Park Preserve		Smithtown	Suffolk	Multiple	543-acre park, features a museum with exhibits about the preserve's history, nature and ecosystems
Cedarmere		Roslyn Harbor	Nassau	Historic house	Early 20th-century mansion, former estate of poet and journalist William Cullen Bryant
Center for Science Teaching and Learning		Rockville Centre	Nassau	Nature preserve	website
Children's Museum of the East End		Bridgehampton	Suffolk	Children's	website
Clinton Academy		East Hampton	Suffolk	Education	website, operated by the East Hampton Historical Society, adjacent to Town House
Cold Spring Harbor Fire House Museum		Cold Spring Harbor	Suffolk	Firefighting	website, firefighting equipment, vehicles, uniforms
Cradle of Aviation Museum		Uniondale	Nassau	Aviation	
Custom House (Sag Harbor, New York)		Sag Harbor	Suffolk	Historic house	Restored late 18th-century house, operated by the Society for the Preservation of Long Island Antiquities
Cutchogue Village Green		Cutchogue	Suffolk	Open air	website, includes Old House (Cutchogue), operated by the Cutchogue-New Suffolk Historical Council
David Conklin Farmhouse Museum		Huntington	Suffolk	Historic house	Operated by the Huntington Historical Society, illustrates three periods of the country's history: Colonial, Federal and Victorian
Davis Town Meeting House		Coram	Suffolk	Historic House	website Historic building that served as the town meeting place for the Town of Brookhaven, for most of the 19th century.
Davis Town Meeting House		Coram	Suffolk	Historic House	website Historic building that served as the town meeting place for the Town of Brookhaven, for most of the 19th century.
Dia Bridgehampton		Bridgehampton	Suffolk	Art	website, one of the twelve locations and sites the Dia Art Foundation manages.
Dr. Daniel Kissam House Museum		Huntington	Suffolk	Historic house	website, operated by the Huntington Historical Society
Earle-Wightman House		Oyster Bay	Nassau	Historic house	Operated by the Oyster Bay Historical Society
East End Seaport Museum		Greenport	Suffolk	Maritime	website, operated by the Oyster Bay Historical Society; Located in former Greenport LIRR station house.
East Hampton Marine Museum		East Hampton	Suffolk	Maritime	website, operated by the East Hampton Historical Society
East Rockaway Grist Mill Museum		East Rockaway	Nassau	Local history	Located in a historic grist mill building
Edwards Homestead		Sayville	Suffolk	Local history	website, operated by the Sayville Historical Society
Elderfields Preserve		Flower Hill	Nassau	Multiple	Includes several historic buildings, an art gallery, and a nature preserve
Falaise Mansion		Sands Point	Nassau	Historic house	website, mid 20th-century mansion of Harry Frank Guggenheim, located in Sands Point Preserve
Fire Boat Fire Fighter Museum		Greenport	Suffolk	Firefighting	website Docked and retired fireboat that is open to tours.
Fire Island Lighthouse		East Rockaway	Suffolk	Lighthouse	
Firehouse Plaza Art Gallery		Uniondale	Nassau	Art	website, part of Nassau Community College
Freeport Historical Museum		Freeport	Nassau	Local history	website, operated by the Freeport Historical Society
Gallery North		Setauket	Suffolk	Art	website, contemporary art in a variety of media: painting, drawing, printmaking, ceramics, sculpture, glass, metal and fiber
Garvies Point Museum and Preserve		Glen Cove	Nassau	Multiple	website, Long Island geology, Native American culture and archaeology, natural history
Guild Hall (Easthampton, New York)		East Hampton	Suffolk	Art	website, community arts center, includes the Guild Hall Museum with art exhibitions of visual artists and emerging regional artists
Hallockville Museum Farm		Riverhead	Suffolk	Open air	18 buildings on 28 acres (110,000 m^{2}) of farmland, Hallock Homestead interpreted to 1880–1910 Victorian era
Halsey House		Southampton	Suffolk	Historic house	
Havens House		Shelter Island	Suffolk	Historic house	Operated by the Shelter Island Historical Society
Heckscher Museum of Art		Huntington	Suffolk	Art	Focused mainly on American landscape paintings and work by Long Island artists, as well as featuring American and European modernism, and photography
Hicksville Gregory Museum		Hicksville	Nassau	Natural history	website, collections of fossils, butterflies, minerals and telephones, located in the Heitz Place Courthouse
Hofstra University Museum		Hempstead	Nassau	Art	Collection includes art, photography and ethnographic objects dating from 5,000 BCE to the contemporary period and representing 6 continents
Holocaust Memorial and Tolerance Center of Nassau County		Glen Cove	Nassau	History	History of the Holocaust, dangers of antisemitism, racism, bullying, and other manifestations of intolerance
Home Sweet Home (New York)		East Hampton	Suffolk	Historic house	website
Hook Windmill		East Hampton	Suffolk	Mill	Restored 1736 windmill
Horton Point Lighthouse		Southold	Suffolk	Lighthouse	Operated by the Southold Historical Society
Islip Art Museum		East Islip	Suffolk	Art	website, contemporary. Housed in historic Brookwood Hall, a former orphanage and Georgian Revival home built in 1903.
Islip Grange		Sayville	Suffolk	Open Air	Historic Long Island and Sayville websites
Jesse and Ira Tuthill Houses		Mattituck	Suffolk	Historic house	18th and 19th-century period houses, operated by the Mattituck-Laurel Historical Society
Islip Town Firefighter Museum		Central Islip	Suffolk	Firefighting	website A showcase to highlight the rich history of the Fire & EMS agencies that have served the communities within the Town of Islip.
Joseph Lloyd Manor		Lloyd Harbor	Suffolk	Historic house	Operated by the Society for the Preservation of Long Island Antiquities, late 18th-century period manor house
Kings Park Heritage Museum		Kings Park	Suffolk	Local history	website
Knothole		North Hills	Nassau	Literature	Museum on Christopher Morley, located inside his writing cabin, Knothole; located within Christopher Morley Park
Lake Ronkonkoma Historical Society Museum		Lake Ronkonkoma	Suffolk	Local history	website
Lauder Museum		Amityville	Suffolk	Local history	website, operated by the Amityville Historical Society
Levittown Historical Museum		Levittown	Nassau	Local history	Facebook site, operated by the Levittown Historical Society
Long Beach Historical Museum		Long Beach	Nassau	Local history	Operated by the Long Beach Historical & Preservation Society
Long Island Children's Museum		Uniondale	Nassau	Children's	website
Long Island Explorium		Port Jefferson	Suffolk	Children's	website, hands-on science S.T.E.M. exploration and more
Long Island Maritime Museum		West Sayville	Suffolk	Maritime	Exhibits include ship models, oyster industry, lifesaving and shipwrecks, sail and power boats, area Dutch heritage
Long Island Museum of American Art, History, and Carriages		Stony Brook	Suffolk	Multiple	American art, Long Island history, over 200 horse-drawn carriages
Long Island Psychiatric Museum		West Brentwood	Suffolk	Medical	History of the three Long Island hospitals (Kings Park, Central Islip, Pilgrim) that were active at one time and have since been merged with Pilgrim Psychiatric Center
Long Island Science Center		Riverhead	Suffolk	Science	website, hands-on science activities
LongHouse Reserve		East Hampton	Suffolk	Art	16-acre sculpture garden reserve, created by Jack Lenor Larsen
Manor St. George		Ridge	Suffolk	Historic house	Longwood Estate
Maple Lane Museum Complex		Southold	Suffolk	Open air	website, operated by the Southold Historical Society, includes the Joseph Nelson Hallock House, Thomas Moore House, a print shop, blacksmith shop, farm equipment shed, barn, schoolhouse, ice house, corn crib and outhouses
Mather House Museum		Port Jefferson	Suffolk	Open air	Headquarters of the Port Jefferson Historical Society, complex of 5 historic buildings
Meadow Croft		Bayport	Suffolk	Historic house	Operated by the Bayport Heritage Association, late 19th century summer estate of John Ellis Roosevelt
Mill Neck Manor		Mill Neck	Nassau	Historic house	20th-century Tudor Revival mansion, guided tours once a month by appointment
Montauk County Park		Montauk	Suffolk	Historic house	Includes 18th-century Third House, open seasonally
Montauk Point Lighthouse		Montauk	Suffolk	Maritime	Lighthouse and local history and maritime museum
Mulford Farmhouse		East Hampton	Suffolk	Living	Operated by the East Hampton Historical Society, 1790s period farm
Museum of American Armor		Old Bethpage	Suffolk	Military	website A collection of more than 35 operational armored vehicles from WW II that are presented for the purpose of honoring our armed forces and the nation's largest veterans population while offering an immersion experience for visitors who discover the heroes within their own families.
Nassau County Firefighters Museum and Education Center		Uniondale	Nassau	Firefighting	website, located inside the Cradle of Aviation Museum
Nassau County Museum of Art		Roslyn Harbor	Nassau	Art	Includes 19th- and 20th-century European and American art, and a children's art museum
National Jewish Museum Sports Hall of Fame		Commack	Suffolk	Sports	American Jewish figures who have distinguished themselves in sports
Port Washington North Nautical Art Museum		Port Washington North	Nassau	Art	Located at Bay Walk Park
Northport Historical Society and Museum		Northport	Suffolk	Local history	Located in the former library; Listed on NRHP since December 6, 1996
Oheka Castle		Huntington	Suffolk	Historic house	Early 20th-century mansion, now a hotel, open for guided tours by reservation
Old Bethpage Village Restoration		Old Bethpage	Nassau	Living	Mid-19th-century farming village
Old House (Cutchogue)		Cutchogue	Suffolk	Historic house	Part of Cutchogue Village Green, operated by the Cutchogue-New Suffolk Historical Council
Old Village Hall Museum		Lindenhurst	Suffolk	Historic house	website, operated by the Lindenhurst Historical Society
Old Westbury Gardens		Old Westbury	Nassau	Historic house	Former estate of John Shaffer Phipp
Oyster Bay Railroad Museum		Oyster Bay	Nassau	Railroad	Museum under development, includes the Oyster Bay Long Island Rail Road Turntable
Oysterponds Historical Society Museum		Orient	Suffolk	Open air	website, includes the late 18th-century Village House with local history exhibits, 18th-century Webb House, late 19th-century schoolhouse
Pagan-Fletcher House		Valley Stream	Nassau	Historic house	Operated by the Valley Stream Historical Society
Parrish Art Museum		Southampton	Suffolk	Art	American art, with an emphasis on artists from Eastern Long Island
Phillips House Museum		Rockville Centre	Nassau	Historic house	website, Facebook site, operated by the Rockville Centre Historical Society, restored Victorian house with exhibits of local history
Planting Fields Arboretum State Historic Park		Oyster Bay	Nassau	Historic house	Includes the Coe Hall Historic House Museum, an arboretum and state park covering over 400 acres (1.6 km^{2})
Polish American Museum		Port Washington	Nassau	Ethnic	Achievements of the people of Polish heritage in America, includes folk art, costumes, historical artifacts and paintings
Pollock-Krasner House and Studio		East Hampton	Suffolk	Biographical	House of Jackson Pollock
Railroad Museum of Long Island		Riverhead	Suffolk	Railroad	Also a location in Greenport
Raynham Hall Museum		Oyster Bay	Nassau	Historic house	Restored 22 room house reflecting the 1770s through the 1870s
Rock Hall Museum		Lawrence	Nassau	Historic house	Mid-18th-century period plantation-style house
Roslyn Landmark Society		Roslyn	Nassau	Local history	Operated by the Roslyn Landmark Society
Saddle Rock Grist Mill		Saddle Rock	Nassau	Mill	Restored tidal grist mill
Sag Harbor Fire Department Museum		Sag Harbor	Suffolk	Firefighting	Displays artifacts, murals, photographs, uniforms and equipment dating back to the year 1803 when the fire department was first established.
Sag Harbor Whaling & Historical Museum		Sag Harbor	Suffolk	Maritime	Town's whaling industry, whaling equipment, local history
Sagamore Hill National Historic Site		Cove Neck	Nassau	Historic house	Home of Theodore Roosevelt, includes Roosevelt museum
Sagtikos Manor		West Bay Shore	Suffolk	Historic house	Operated by the Sagtikos Manor Historical Society, reflects construction and ownership from the 17th to the 20th centuries
Sands-Willets House		Flower Hill	Nassau	Multiple	Operated by the Cow Neck Peninsula Historical Society; local history museum in a historic house
Science Museum of Long Island		Plandome Manor	Nassau	Science	website, hands-on science programs for children
Sea Cliff Village Museum		Sea Cliff	Nassau	Local history	Includes a Victorian kitchen, toy and doll collection
Sherwood-Jayne House		Setauket	Suffolk	Historic house	Maintained by the Society for the Preservation of Long Island Antiquities, 18th-century house
Shinnecock Nation Cultural Center & Museum		Southampton	Suffolk	Native American	website, history and culture of the Shinnecock Indian Nation
Smithtown Historical Society		Branch	Suffolk	Historic house	website, Facebook site, open during programs and events, includes the Caleb Smith House, 1750 Judge John Lawrence Smith Homestead, 1700 Obadiah Smith House, barns
Society for the Preservation of Long Island Antiquities Museum Gallery		Cold Spring Harbor	Suffolk	Local history	website, housed in a former 1842 Methodist-Episcopal church building
Soldiers & Sailors Memorial Building		Huntington	Suffolk	Local history	website, operated by the Huntington Historical Society
South Fork Natural History Museum and Nature Center		Bridgehampton	Suffolk	Natural history	website
Southampton Historical Museum		Southampton	Suffolk	Open air	website, operated by the Southampton Historical Society, includes the William Rogers Mansion, one-room schoolhouse, 1825 barn, 19th-century trade store, the 17th-century Halsey House, a 19th-century paint store, blacksmith's shop, cobbler's shop,
Southold Indian Museum		Southold	Suffolk	Native American	website, archaeological artifacts and culture of the Indians of Long Island, includes Algonquin pottery, arrowheads, knife blades, hoe blades, hammers, gouges, drills and other tools
Staller Center		Stony Brook	Suffolk	Art	Arts center of Stony Brook University, includes the Paul W. Zuccaire Gallery
Steinberg Museum of Art at Hillwood		Brookville	Nassau	Art	Part of Long Island University, temporary exhibitions that span from antiquity to contemporary art
Stony Brook Grist Mill		Stony Brook	Suffolk	Mill	
Suffolk County Historical Society Museum		Riverhead	Suffolk	Local history	Exhibits include 18th to 20th-century paintings and furniture, whaling, farming, early transportation, local ceramics, military artifacts
Suffolk County Farm and Education Center		Yaphank	Suffolk	Farm	website, operated by Cornell Cooperative Extension, working farm with education programs
Suffolk County Police Museum		Yaphank	Suffolk	Law enforcement	website
Suydam House		Centerport	Suffolk	Historic house	Operated by the Greenlawn-Centerport Historical Association, 18th-century house and local history exhibits
Swan River Schoolhouse		East Patchogue	Suffolk	School	website, operated by the Greater Patchogue Historical Society, historic schoolhouse
Tackapausha Museum and Preserve		Seaford	Nassau	Natural history	website, live animals, displays about the ecology of Long Island
Theodore Roosevelt County Park		Montauk	Suffolk	Military	Includes exhibits about the Spanish–American War, the Rough Riders and Camp Wikoff
Thomas Dodge House		Port Washington	Nassau	Historic house	Operated by the Cow Neck Peninsula Historical Society
Three Village Historical Society		Setauket	Suffolk	Local history	website
Town House		East Hampton	Suffolk	Education	website, operated by the East Hampton Historical Society, adjacent to Clinton Academy
Tuthill House Museum		Westhampton Beach	Suffolk	Historic house	website, operated by the Westhampton Beach Historical Society
Vanderbilt Museum		Centerport	Suffolk	Multiple	Historic mansion with collections of natural history, marine, weaponry and ethnographic objects
Verizon Telecom Pioneer Museum		Commack	Suffolk	Technology	Also known as Long Island Telephone Pioneers Museum, established by the Long Island Chapter of the Telephone Pioneers of America
Walt Whitman Birthplace State Historic Site		West Hills	Suffolk	Historic house	
Wantagh Museum		Wantagh	Nassau	Railroad	Historic railroad station, car and post office
Water Mill Museum		Water Mill	Suffolk	Mill	Colonial water-powered grist mill
The Whaling Museum & Education Center		Cold Spring Harbor	Suffolk	Maritime	Whaling and maritime history of Long Island, relationship between people and the ocean
William Floyd House		Mastic	Suffolk	Historic house	Signer of the Declaration of Independence, part of Fire Island National Seashore
William Miller House		Miller Place	Suffolk	Historic house	website, early 18th-century house, operated by the Miller Place-Mount Sinai Historical Society
Wrong Island Railroad		Lake Ronkonkoma	Suffolk	Railroad	website, operating model train display and museum featuring O-gauge trains

== Defunct museums ==
- Dinosaur Walk Museum, Riverhead, closed in 2008, branches still exist in Pigeon Forge, Tennessee and Branson, Missouri
- Goudreau Museum of Mathematics in Art and Science, New Hyde Park, closed in 2006
- Museum of Long Island Natural Sciences, formerly operated by Stony Brook University

== See also ==
- List of museums in New York City
- List of museums in New York
- List of university art museums and galleries in New York State
