= National Register of Historic Places listings in Southold (town), New York =

This list is intended to provide a comprehensive listing of entries on the National Register of Historic Places in Town of Southold, New York. The locations of National Register properties for which the latitude and longitude coordinates are included below, may be seen in an online map.

== Listings ==
	Name on the Register	Image	Date listed	Location	City or town	Description
1	Charles and Anna Bates House	Charles and Anna Bates House	August 18, 2017 (#100001490)	126 Center St. 41°06′17″N 72°21′46″W	Greenport	
2	Brecknock Hall	Brecknock Hall	April 22, 2005 (#05000331)	North Road near Manhassett Avenue; 41°07′00″N 72°21′43″W	Stirling	
3	Congregation Tifereth Israel Synagogue	Congregation Tifereth Israel Synagogue	March 22, 2006 (#06000161)	519 Fourth Street; 41°06′02″N 72°21′55″W	Greenport	
4	Richard Cox House	Richard Cox House	August 21, 1986 (#86001721)	Mill Road; 40°59′55″N 72°33′28″W	Mattituck	
5	East Marion Main Road Historic District		August 8, 2019 (#100004238)	Generally Main Road, Bay Avenue, and Cemetery Avenue; 41°07′40″N 72°20′24″W	East Marion	Represents evolution of East Marion from a settlement of fishermen and farmers in the mid-18th century to a mid-20th century vacation community.
6	FIREFIGHTER	FIREFIGHTER	June 30, 1989 (#89001447)	Docked at Greenport Harbor; 41°05′59″N 72°21′41″W	Greenport	Historic New York City fireboat in front of the East End Seaport Museum and Marine Foundation
7	Fort Corchaug Archeological Site	Fort Corchaug Archeological Site	January 18, 1974 (#74001308)	Address Restricted	Cutchogue	
8	Fort Terry Historic District	Fort Terry Historic District	March 29, 2021 (#100006315)	Plum Island; 41°10′59″N 72°11′25″W	Southold	
9	Andrew Gildersleeve Octagonal Building	Andrew Gildersleeve Octagonal Building	August 19, 1976 (#76001280)	Main Road and Love Lane; 40°59′28″N 72°31′25″W	Mattituck	
10	Greenport Railroad Station	Greenport Railroad Station	July 20, 1989 (#89000947)	Third and Wiggins Streets; 41°05′59″N 72°21′49″W	Greenport	
11	Greenport Village Historic District	Greenport Village Historic District	September 13, 1984 (#84002973)	Roughly bounded by Stirling Basin, Main, Monsell, 2nd, and Front Streets; 41°06′17″N 72°21′53″W	Greenport	
12	Joseph Nelson Hallock House	Joseph Nelson Hallock House	April 22, 2005 (#05000330)	Main Road and Maple Avenue; 41°03′55″N 72°25′26″W	Southold	
13	High House & Studio		September 22, 2025 (#100012249)	7134 Indian Neck Lane; 41°01′48″N 72°26′29″W	Peconic	
14	Horton Point Lighthouse	Horton Point Lighthouse	October 21, 1994 (#94001237)	N end of Lighthouse Road; 41°05′07″N 72°26′47″W	Southold	
15	Samuel Landon House	Samuel Landon House	April 20, 2005 (#05000329)	Main Road Bet. Hobart Road and Maple Lane; 41°03′57″N 72°25′25″W	Southold	
16	Latimer Reef Light Station	Latimer Reef Light Station	July 19, 2006 (#06000635)	In Fishers Island Sound, one mi NW of East Point on Fishers Island; 41°18′15″N 71°56′02″W	Fishers Island	
17	New Suffolk School	New Suffolk School	September 12, 2002 (#02001050)	Fifth Street at King Street; 40°59′32″N 72°28′32″W	New Suffolk	
18	The Old House	The Old House	October 15, 1966 (#66000573)	NY 25; 41°00′29″N 72°29′10″W	Cutchogue	
19	Orient Historic District	Orient Historic District	May 21, 1976 (#76001283)	NY 25, Village Lane and vicinity 41°08′21″N 72°18′11″W	Orient	
20	Orient Point Light Station	Orient Point Light Station	January 9, 2007 (#06001229)	NE tip of Long Island, 1.1 mi. NE of Eastern Terminus of NY 25; 41°09′48″N 72°13′27″W	Orient	
21	Plum Island Light Station	Plum Island Light Station	February 11, 2011 (#11000014)	Northwestern corner of Plum Island; 41°10′25″N 72°12′41″W	Orient Point	
22	Henry W. Prince Building	Henry W. Prince Building	February 24, 2005 (#05000091)	54325 Main Road; 41°03′53″N 72°25′40″W	Southold	
23	Race Rock Light Station	Race Rock Light Station	April 29, 2005 (#05000347)	0.6 mi. SW of Race Point; 41°14′44″N 72°02′49″W	Fishers Island	
24	Southold Historic District	Southold Historic District	October 14, 1997 (#97001202)	Along Main Road, roughly bounded by Jockey Creek Drive, Griswold Street, Long Island RR Tracks, and Wells Road; 41°03′35″N 72°26′01″W	Southold	
25	Terry-Mulford House	Terry-Mulford House	February 7, 1984 (#84003003)	NY 25; 41°09′06″N 72°16′38″W	Orient	
26	Town Doctors' House and Site	Town Doctors' House and Site	January 5, 2005 (#04001448)	310 Ackerly Pond Lane; 41°03′25″N 72°26′12″W	Southold	
27	David Tuthill Farmstead	David Tuthill Farmstead	November 23, 1984 (#84000295)	New Suffolk Lane; 41°00′25″N 72°29′39″W	Cutchogue	
28	Jesse and Ira Tuthill House	Jesse and Ira Tuthill House	March 22, 2006 (#06000158)	Main Road and Cardinal Drive; 40°59′49″N 72°31′11″W	Mattituck	
29	Joshua Wells House	Joshua Wells House	March 6, 2002 (#02000139)	525 New Suffolk Road; 41°00′35″N 72°29′05″W	Cutchogue	

== See also ==
- National Register of Historic Places listings in New York
- National Register of Historic Places listings in Suffolk County, New York
