= Joseph N. Hallock =

American editor, politician, and banker

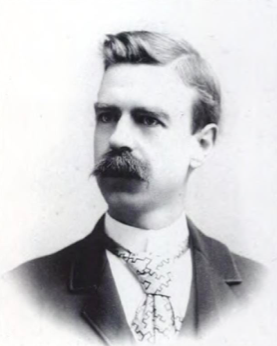
Joseph Nelson Hallock

Joseph Nelson Hallock (September 16, 1861 – October 1, 1942) was an American newspaper editor, politician, and banker from New York.

== Early life and education ==
Hallock was born on September 16, 1861, in Bay View, Southold, New York, the son of George Hallock and Maria Jane Dickinson. He was descended on both sides of his family to the founders and first settlers of Southold, Long Island.

Hallock grew up in his family farm and attended Southold Academy.

== Editorial career ==
When he was 21, he moved to Greenport and purchased an interest in the Suffolk Times. He spent the next two years learning the printing business, followed by a year working as a teacher. He then became associate editor of the Long Island Traveller in Southold, where he stayed for the next three years. After the paper's owner, M. B. Vandusen, sold the paper and bought the Advance in Patchogue, Hallock followed him and worked for that paper for about a year. In 1889, he bought the Traveller and became its editor and proprietor. Hallock for several years was the editor of the Cosmopolitan Magazine having achieved the number of 1,200 subscriptions.

== Political career ==
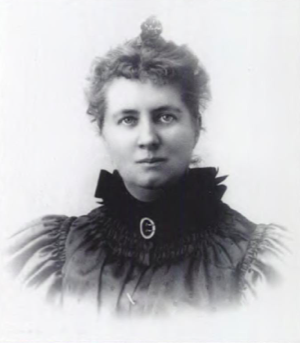
Ella Boldry Hallock

Hallock made his first political speech when he was 19, and he appeared on the stump for presidential campaigns. He was a member of the Republican County Committee for several years. In 1898, he was elected to the New York State Assembly as a Republican, representing the Suffolk County 1st District. He served in the Assembly in 1899, 1900, and 1901.

Hallock retired from the newspaper business in 1927. He was a trustee and president of the Southold Savings Bank as well as a founder and director of the Bank of Southold. He served as Town Clerk for 25 years and as a member and president of board of education for the Southold Union Free School District.

Hallock was a member of the Freemasons, the Odd Fellows, and the Royal Arcanum. He was a trustee of the Southold Methodist Episcopal Church. He was also a charter member of the Protection Engine Company of the Southold Fire Department, honorary chairman of the Southold Town Tercentenary celebration in 1940, and a life member of the Suffolk County Historical Society. In 1889, he married Ella Boldry of Green Island, a notable author who aided her husband's editorial work. They had one daughter, Ann.

Hallock died at home on October 1, 1942. He was buried in his family plot in the Southold Presbyterian Cemetery.

The Joseph Nelson Hallock House, built in 1900, is listed in the National Register of Historic Places and is part of the Maple Lane Museum Complex in Southold.

New York State Assembly
Preceded by Erastus F. Post	New York State Assembly; Suffolk County, 1st District; 1899–1901	Succeeded by Willis A. Reeve
