= Southold =

Southold may refer:

- Southold, New York, a town located in Suffolk County, New York, USA
- Southold (CDP), New York, a census-designated place and hamlet in the town of Southold, New York, USA
- Former name of Southolt, Suffolk, England
- Southold (LIRR station), a station along the Main Line (Greenport Branch) of the Long Island Rail Road. It is located on Youngs Avenue and Traveler Street, just north of NY 25 (Main Road) in Southold, New York, and is the last LIRR station to be located north of NY 25
- Southold High School
- Southold Historic District, a national historic district located at the hamlet of Southold in Suffolk County, New York
