= Wells Farm (New York State) =

Historic farm on Long Island

- Interactive map of Wells Farm
- Town/City: Riverhead, New York, US
- Coordinates: 40°58′6.25″N 72°37′42.6″W
- Established: November 21, 1661; 364 years ago
- Area: 300 acres (120 ha)
- Produces: Pigs, chickens, potatoes, grain
- Status: Open

Wells Farm is an American 300 acres (120 ha) family run farm that has been in operation since November 20, 1661. It is the oldest farm in the Long Island region of Riverhead and the only one to keep its original name. The farm was founded by one of 13 Puritan families led by Reverend John Youngs that came across the Long Island Sound from the beleaguered New Haven Colony in Connecticut to live among the Shinnecock tribe members in 1640, eventually founding the town of Southold. In 1661 the Wells family received three farm holdings when the Puritans divided their common land holdings leased from the Shinnecock tribe in 1641. Many generations of the Wells family have been operating the farm, and although the family maintains a detailed genealogy, there is no written text of the family's history.

Eric Wells Sr and his wife Darlyn operate the farm along with Eric's parents Todd and Laura Wells. The farm sells livestock to the public as well as cultivating grain and potatoes commercially. The Wells family also operates the Wells Homestead Acres which is the largest asparagus producer on Long Island. On November 13, 2025 and on March 30, 2026 the farm suffered heavily damage from fires.

In 1982 the two Wells family farms were recognized by the New York State Agricultural Society and awarded a "century" award along with two other farms in the Hudson Valley for their respective families 300 years of farming.

== See also ==
- Hallock Homestead
