= Southold (CDP), New York =

Southold, New York
- Hamlet and census-designated place
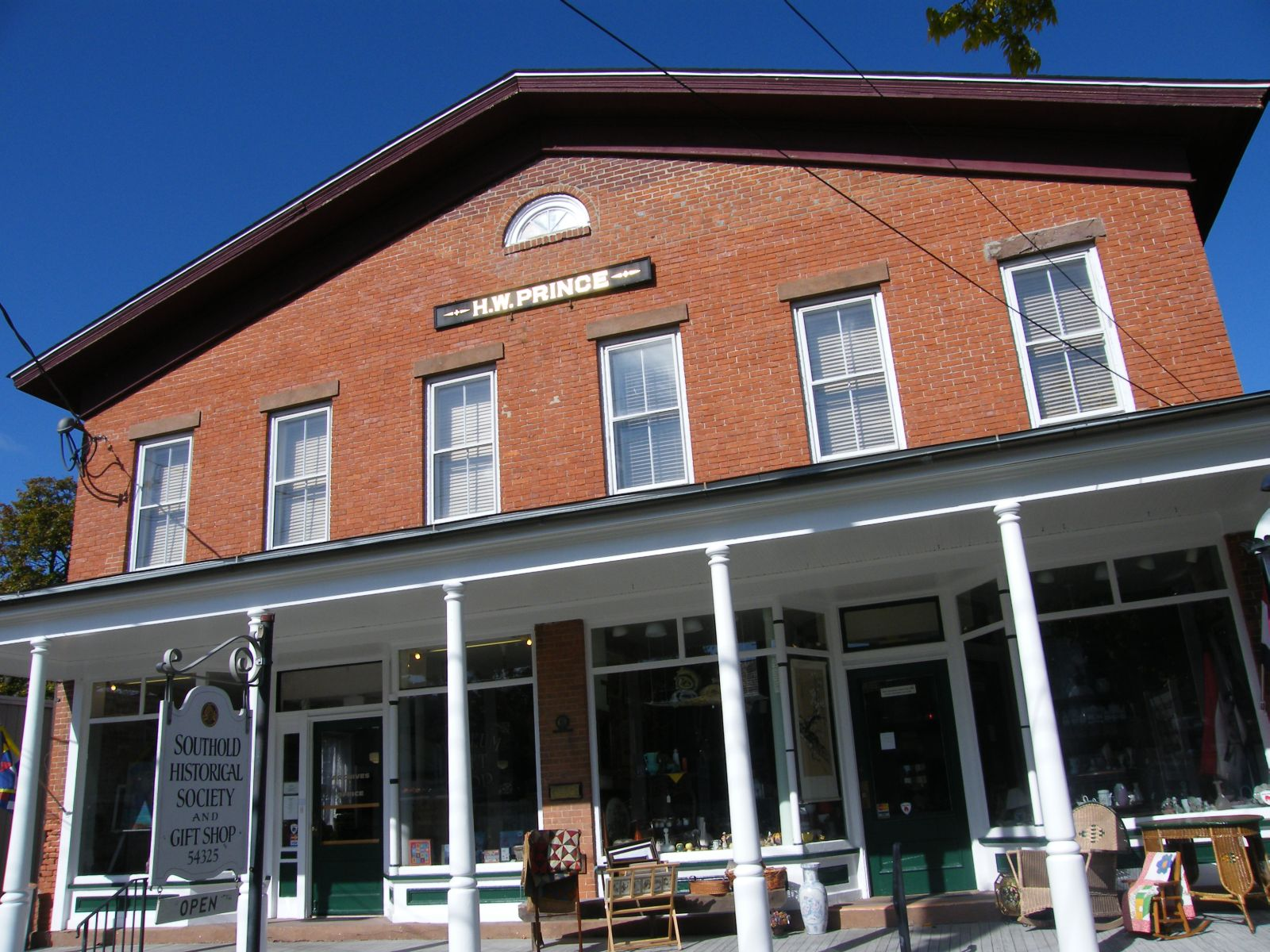
- The historic Henry W. Prince Building on NY 25 in Southold

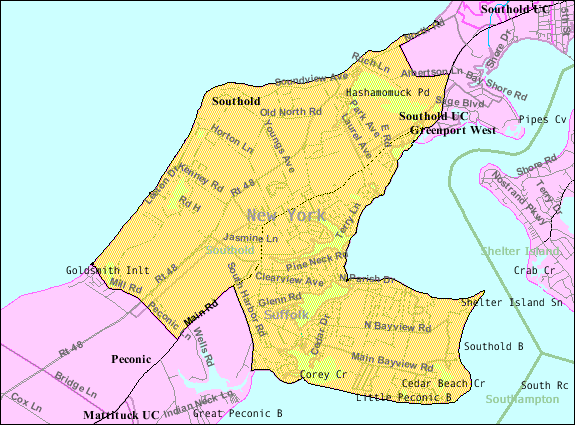

- Location within New York
- Coordinates: 41°3′20″N 72°25′15″W
- Country: United States
- State: New York
- County: Suffolk
- Town: Southold

Area
  - Total: 14.55 sq mi (37.69 km^{2})
  - Land: 10.46 sq mi (27.10 km^{2})
  - Water: 4.08 sq mi (10.58 km^{2})
- Elevation: 23 ft (7 m)

Population (2020)
  - Total: 6,040
  - Density: 577.2/sq mi (222.85/km^{2})
- Time zone: UTC-5 (Eastern (EST))
  - Summer (DST): UTC-4 (EDT)
- ZIP code: 11971
- Area codes: 631, 934
- FIPS code: 36-69452
- GNIS feature ID: 0965910

Southold is a census-designated place (CDP) that generally corresponds to the hamlet by the same name in the Town of Southold in Suffolk County, New York, United States. The CDP population was 5,748 at the 2010 census.

== History ==
Southold was the first English settlement in the future New York State, though this is partially due to a historical technicality—the territory of New Netherland was still owned by the Dutch at the time, but Southold lay in a part of Long Island that was part of Connecticut at the time and was later ceded in a legal dispute.

English Puritans from New Haven, Connecticut, settled in Southold on October 21, 1640. Under the leadership of the Reverend John Youngs, with Peter Hallock (after lots were drawn, the first to step ashore), the settlement consisted of the families of Barnabas Horton, John Budd, John Conklin, William Wells, John Tuthill, Thomas Mapes, Richard Terry, Matthias Corwin, Robert Akerly, and Isaac Arnold. The land had been purchased in the summer of 1640 from an Indian tribe, the Corchaugs. The Indian name of what became Southold was Yenicott.

Southold was to remain under the jurisdiction of New Haven until 1662, and of Connecticut until 1674. When the colony of New York was handed over to the Dutch in 1673, the eastern towns, including Southold, Easthampton and Southampton, refused to submit; the Dutch attempted to force the matter by arms, and the colonists of the towns repelled them, with assistance from Connecticut. When New York became English again in 1674, these eastern towns preferred to stay part of Connecticut, and Connecticut agreed, but the government of James, Duke of York, forced the matter. New York Governor Sir Edmund Andros threatened to eliminate the residents' rights to land if they did not yield, which they did by 1676. This is largely a result of the Duke of York's grudge against Connecticut, as New Haven had hidden three of the judges who sentenced the Duke's father, King Charles I, to death in 1649.

The name Southold is believed by some to be a misspelling of Southwold, which is a coastal town in the corresponding English county of Suffolk. This claim is debatable, but John Youngs was born and brought up in Southwold. Also within the New York hamlet is an area known as Reydon Shores. Reydon is the adjoining village to Southwold in England and was the home of John Youngs' wife. An alternative explanation is that the name refers to a "holding" to the south of New Haven, from whence the original settlers hailed. Many of the hamlet's older structures are included in the Southold Historic District, added to the National Register of Historic Places in 1997.

== Geography ==
According to the United States Census Bureau, the CDP has a total area of 11.3 square miles (29.3 km^{2}), of which 10.5 square miles (27.1 km^{2}) is land and 0.85 square miles (2.2 km^{2}), or 7.55%, is water.

Historical population
Census	Pop.	Note	%±
2020	6,040		—
U.S. Decennial Census

== Demographics ==
As of the census of 2020, there were 6,040 people, 2,617 households, and 1,603 families residing in the CDP. The population density was 522.2 inhabitants per square mile (201.6/km^{2}). There were 3,710 housing units at an average density of 354.5 per square mile (136.9/km^{2}). The racial makeup of the CDP was 83% White, 1.4% Asian, 1.2% Black or African American, 0.5% Native American, 0% Pacific Islander, 7.5% from other races, and 6.4% from two or more races. Hispanic or Latino of any race were 12.9% of the population.

There were 2,317 households, out of which 20.4% had children under the age of 18 living with them, 53.3% were married couples living together, 27% had a female householder with no spouse present. 26.4% of all households were made up of individuals, and 16.6% had someone living alone who was 65 years of age or older. The average household size was 2.35 and the average family size was 2.83.

In the CDP, the population was spread out, with 20.7% under the age of 18, 4.2% from 18 to 24, 23.5% from 25 to 44, 25.7% from 45 to 64, and 25.9% who were 65 years of age or older. The median age was 46 years. For every 100 females, there were 93.1 males. For every 100 females age 18 and over, there were 91.2 males.

The median income for a household in the community was $47,074, and the median income for a family was $63,032. Males had a median income of $51,094 versus $29,342 for females. The per capita income for the CDP was $29,761. About 1.2% of families and 2.1% of the population were below the poverty line, including 2.4% of those under age 18 and 1.6% of those age 65 or over.

== School ==
- Southold Union Free School District
