= LICM =

LICM may refer to:

- Long Island Children's Museum
- Loop-invariant code motion
