= Mattituck-Cutchogue Union Free School District =

School district in the U.S. state of New York

Location
- Southold, New York United States

District information
- Type: Public School District
- Established: early 1970s
- Superintendent: Shawn Petretti
- Asst. superintendent(s): Lisa Bieber
- Schools: 2

Students and staff
- Teachers: 45
- Staff: 149

Other information
- Website: www.mufsd.com

Mattituck-Cutchogue Union Free School District is a public school district located on the North Fork of Long Island, in Suffolk County, New York, United States. It primarily serves the western part of the Town of Southold, as well as a small portion of the Town of Riverhead, and includes the entirety of Mattituck, Cutchogue and Laurel, as well as portions of Jamesport and Northville. To the east, the district is bordered by the Southold Union Free School District, and on the west, the Riverhead Central School District.

The district superintendent is Shawn Petretti, his assistant is Lisa Bieber.

== Schools ==
Mattituck-Cutchogue Jr/Sr High School (often referred to as Mattituck High School) caters to students in 7th grade-12th grade. It also operates an email service for these students. The high school building was originally built in 1934.

Officials include:

- Principal- Patrick Burke
- Assistant Principal- Heather Stewart

Cutchogue East Elementary School caters to students in grades from kindergarten to 6th grade. They have a strict policy on kindness and grade students with a 1-4 grading system.

Officials include:

- Principal- Amy Brennan
- Vice principal- Christina Zaweski

== History ==
The school district was formed in the early 1970s when the Cutchogue and Mattituck school districts combined. After a vote in 1997, the 100-student Laurel school district was added.

In 2015, the Mattituck High School Varsity Baseball Team won the New York State Class B title, the first state championship in the program's 95-year history.

In 2021, the salutatorian Weronika Jachimowicz went mildly viral for her yearbook photo in which she wore a goth outfit.

In 2022, the school's gymnasium was hit by a tornado, striking need for renovations

== Enrollment ==
The student total peaked at 1,614 in the 2007-08 school year and has been steadily decreasing since, first dropping below 1,000 in the 2023-24 school year.

Number of students per school year:

- 1998-99: 1,496
- 1999-2000: 1,505
- 2000-01: 1,526
- 2001-02: 1,547
- 2002-03: 1,562
- 2003-04: 1,563
- 2004-05: 1,581
- 2005-06: 1,561
- 2006-07: 1,588
- 2007-08: 1,614
- 2008-09: 1,505
- 2009-10: 1,514
- 2010-11: 1,492
- 2011-12: 1,418
- 2012-13: 1,388
- 2013-14: 1,344
- 2014-15: 1,304
- 2015-16: 1,224
- 2016-17: 1,197
- 2017-18: 1,167
- 2018-19: 1,128
- 2019-20: 1,101
- 2020-21: 1,089
- 2021-22: 1,066
- 2022-23: 1,000
- 2023-24: 972
- 2024-25: 981
