= Erastus F. Post =

American civil engineer, politician, and banker

Erastus Foster Post (July 3, 1859 – March 30, 1937) was an American civil engineer, politician, and banker from New York.

== Early life and education ==
Post was born on July 3, 1859, in Quogue, New York, the son of farmer and politician George Oliver Post and Harriet Foster. He attended the Bridgehampton Academy and Williston Seminary in Easthampton, Massachusetts, graduating from the latter's scientific department in 1880. Post then returned to Quogue, where he worked as a surveyor, civil engineer, and manager of his father's farm. In 1886, he was appointed Commissioner of Highways to fill an unexpired term and elected to the office a year later.

== Career ==
In 1895, Post was elected to the New York State Assembly as a Republican, representing the Suffolk County 1st District. He served in the Assembly in 1896, 1897, and 1898. During World War I, he was chairman of the Eastern Suffolk County draft board, a trustee of the village of Quogue, a member of the board of education for the Quogue Union Free School District, and a Quogue fire commissioner.

Post was a director of the Southampton Bank since its founding in 1888, treasurer of the Quogue Ice Company since its founding in 1893, and a trustee of the Sag Harbor Savings Bank. He later became president of Seaside Bank and Quantuck Water Works Co., vice-president and director of the Queens, Nassau & Suffolk Realty Co., director and vice-president of the Nassau-Suffolk Bond and Mortgage Guarantee Co., and trustee of the Riverhead Savings Bank and the Suffolk County Mutual Insurance Co. He later became vice president of the Riverhead Savings Bank, and in 1932, he became the bank president.

Post was a member of the Freemasons, the Royal Arch Masonry, the Shriners, and the American Geographical Society. He was a trustee of the Quogue Presbyterian Church. In 1885, he married Anna Grace Foster of Honesdale, Pennsylvania.

Post died on a train near Richmond, Virginia, on March 30, 1937. He was returning home from a fishing trip in Fort Myers, Florida, where he overexerted himself and had a heart attack that lead to his death. He was buried in Riverhead Cemetery in Riverhead.

New York State Assembly
Preceded by District Created	New York State Assembly; Suffolk County, 1st District; 1896–1898	Succeeded by Joseph N. Hallock
