= Stony Brook Grist Mill =

- U.S. National Register of Historic Places
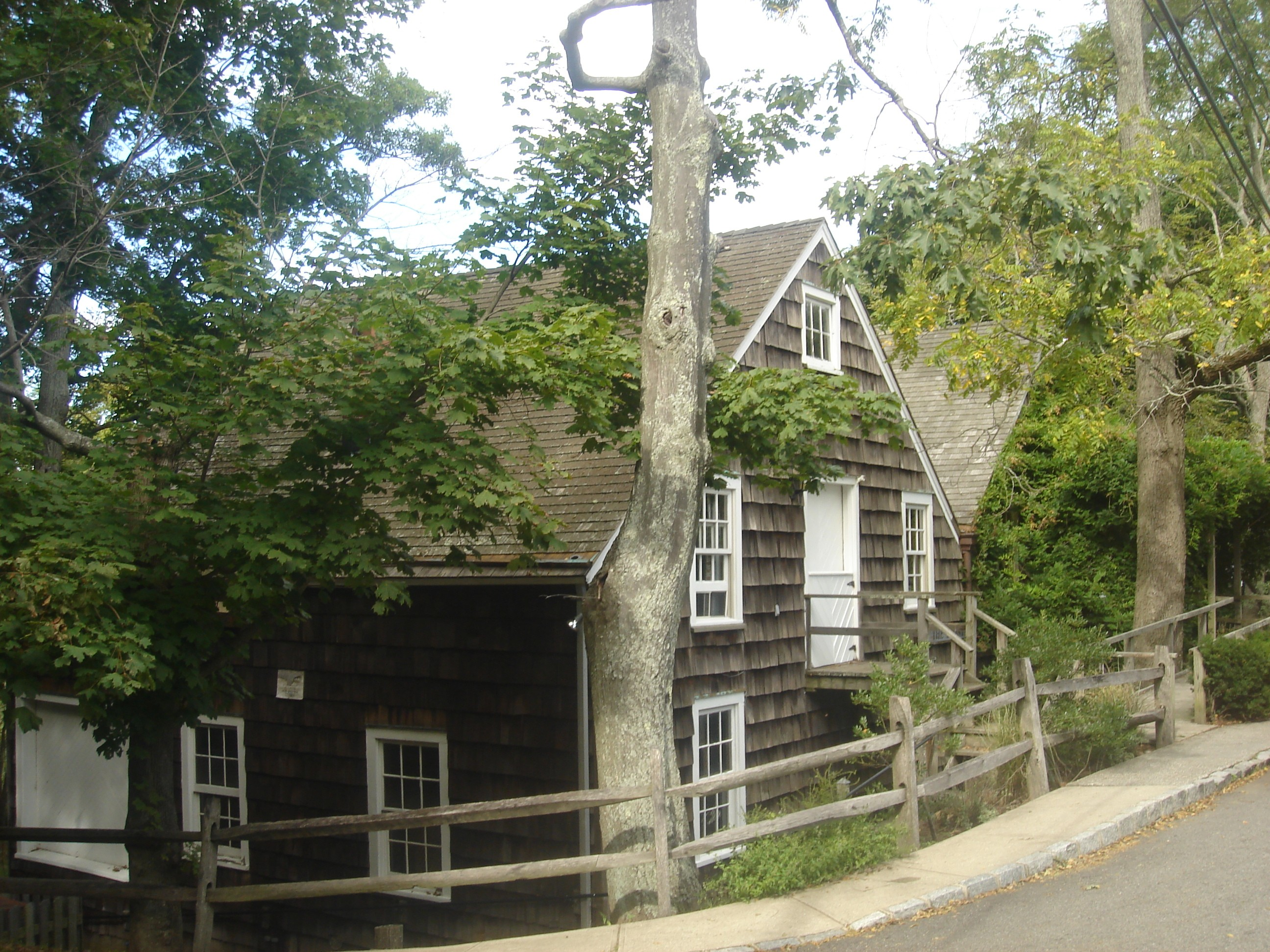

- Location within New York Location within the United States
- Location: Harbor Road, West of Main Street; Stony Brook, New York
- Coordinates: 40°54′53.7″N 73°8′51.52″W
- Area: 12 acres (4.9 ha)
- NRHP reference No.: 90001140
- Added to NRHP: August 3, 1990

The Stony Brook Grist Mill is a Registered Historic Place property in Stony Brook, Suffolk County, New York. Its construction in 1699 created the Mill Pond astride the Brookhaven-Smithtown boundary. The mill structure itself dates back to at least circa 1751.

== History ==
The Stony Brook Grist Mill, Long Island's most fully operational mill, features on both the National and New York State Registers of Historic Places.

In the late 1800s, a vineyard flourished on the island within the Mill Pond's confines. Catawba grapes, harvested from this vineyard, underwent pressing and fermentation within the Stony Brook Grist Mill. The resulting wine was then bottled in Brooklyn and distributed through a nearby tavern.

Even into the 1950s, local farmers continued to rely on the mill's services, bringing their wheat and corn for grinding. Miller Schaefer specialized in milling natural wheat, producing "health food" that gained popularity nationwide, with shipments reaching customers in 42 states.

Flooding from an August 2024 storm collapsed the roadway adjacent to the mill, emptying the mill pond into the harbor. The mill was not damaged but required cleanup after being buried in sand.

== Conservatory ==
Today the Ward Melville Heritage Organization owns and operates the mill as a working mill museum.
