= Amelia Cottage Museum =

Historic house in New York, United States

- Miss Amelia's Cottage
- U.S. National Register of Historic Places
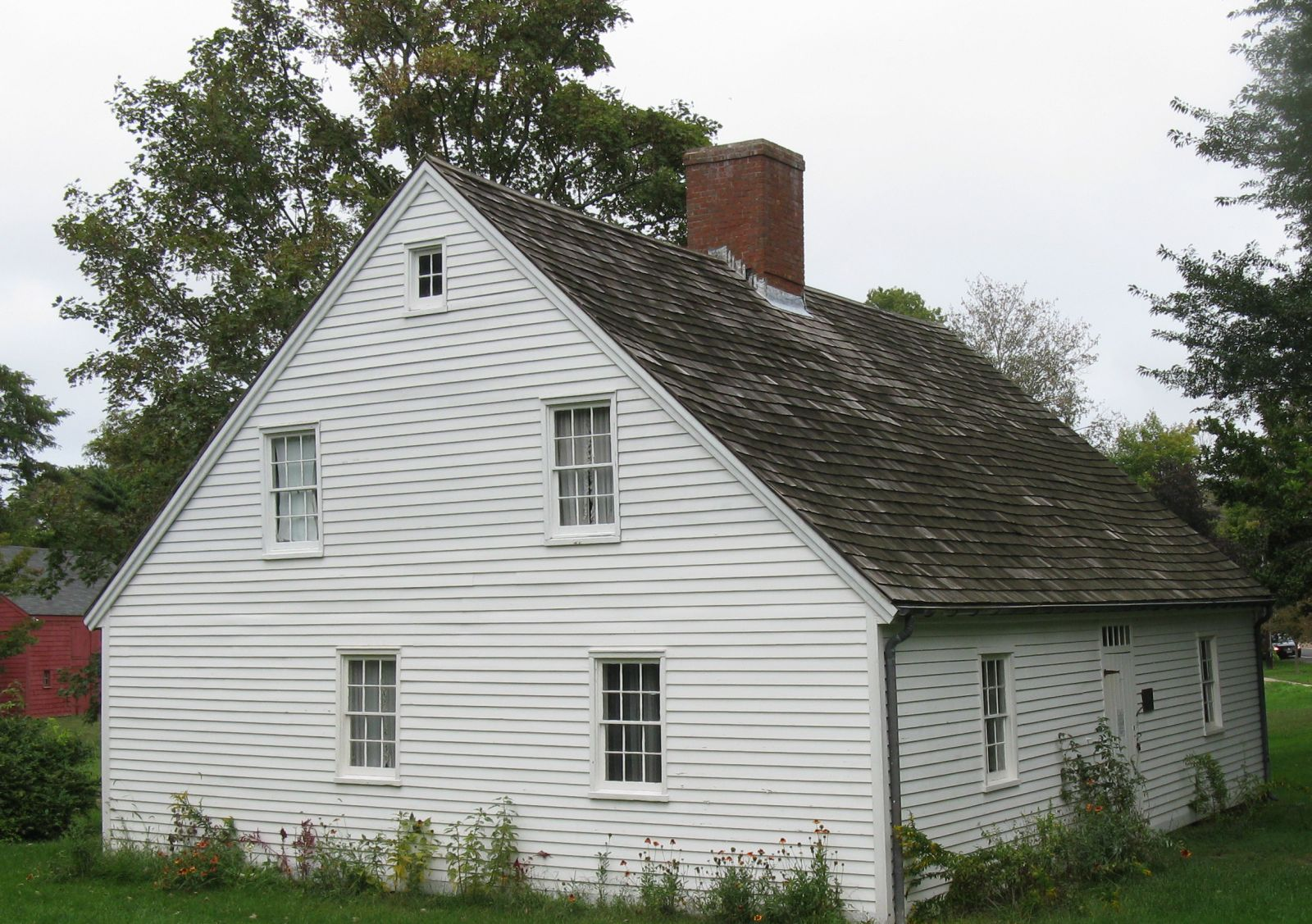
- Amelia Cottage Museum, September 2008

- Location within New York Location within the United States
- Location: N side Main St., at the jct. of Windmill La., Town of East Hampton, Amagansett, New York
- Coordinates: 40°58′26″N 72°8′39″W
- Area: 1 acre (0.40 ha)
- Built: 1725
- Architectural style: Colonial, Post-medieval English
- NRHP reference No.: 94000070
- Added to NRHP: February 25, 1994

The Amelia Cottage Museum, sometimes referred to as Miss Amelia's Cottage & Roy Lester Carriage House, on Montauk Highway in Amagansett, New York, is operated by the Amagansett Historical Association as a museum of family life in Amagansett over three centuries. The house was built in 1725 for Catherine Schellinger and moved to its current location in 1794. The last known occupant, Mary Amelia Schellinger, was born in the house in 1841 and lived there until about a year before she died in 1930. Thirty Schellinger children are believed to have been born in this house.

It was added to the National Register of Historic Places in 1994.
