= Long Island Children's Museum =

Children's museum in Nassau County, New York

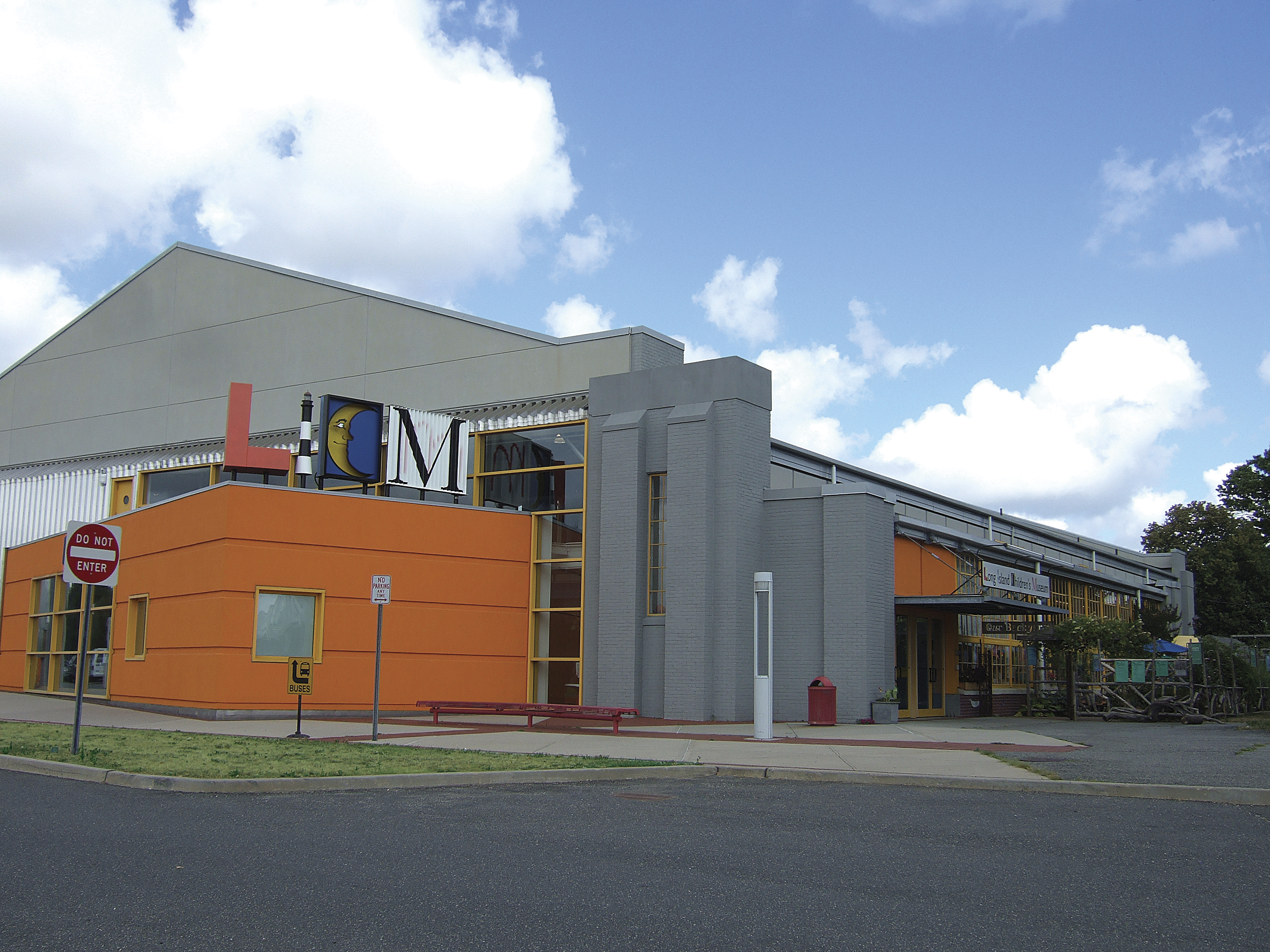
- Established: 1993
- Location: 11 Davis Ave, Uniondale, New York, U.S.
- Coordinates: 40.7280°N 73.6004°W
- Type: Children's museum
- Website: Official website

The Long Island Children’s Museum (LICM) is a Children's museum located on the campus of Mitchel Field in the East Garden City section of Uniondale, New York, United States.

== History ==
The museum was established in 1993 in the old Newsday building across from Roosevelt Field Mall in East Garden City. It moved in 2001 to a former airplane hangar with 40,000 square feet spread over two stories. The county provided the hangar rent-free under a 60-year lease and the museum is to keep all revenue.

== Description ==
It has 12 galleries with interactive exhibits, three studio workshops and a 150-seat theater. The museum can host over 250,000 visitors per year. The outdoor play area, known as "Our Backyard," opens each spring. The play area has become the most popular part of the museum and includes vegetable gardens where visitors can harvest various vegetables directly from the garden.

== Awards ==
LICM is a recipient of the National Medal for Museum and Library Service and has been designated a "Primary Institution" by the New York State Council on the Arts.

== See also ==
- List of museums on Long Island
- Cradle of Aviation Museum
