= Halsey House (Southampton, New York) =

Historic American house, now the Southampton Historical Museum

Coordinates: 40°52′37.5″N 72°23′18″W

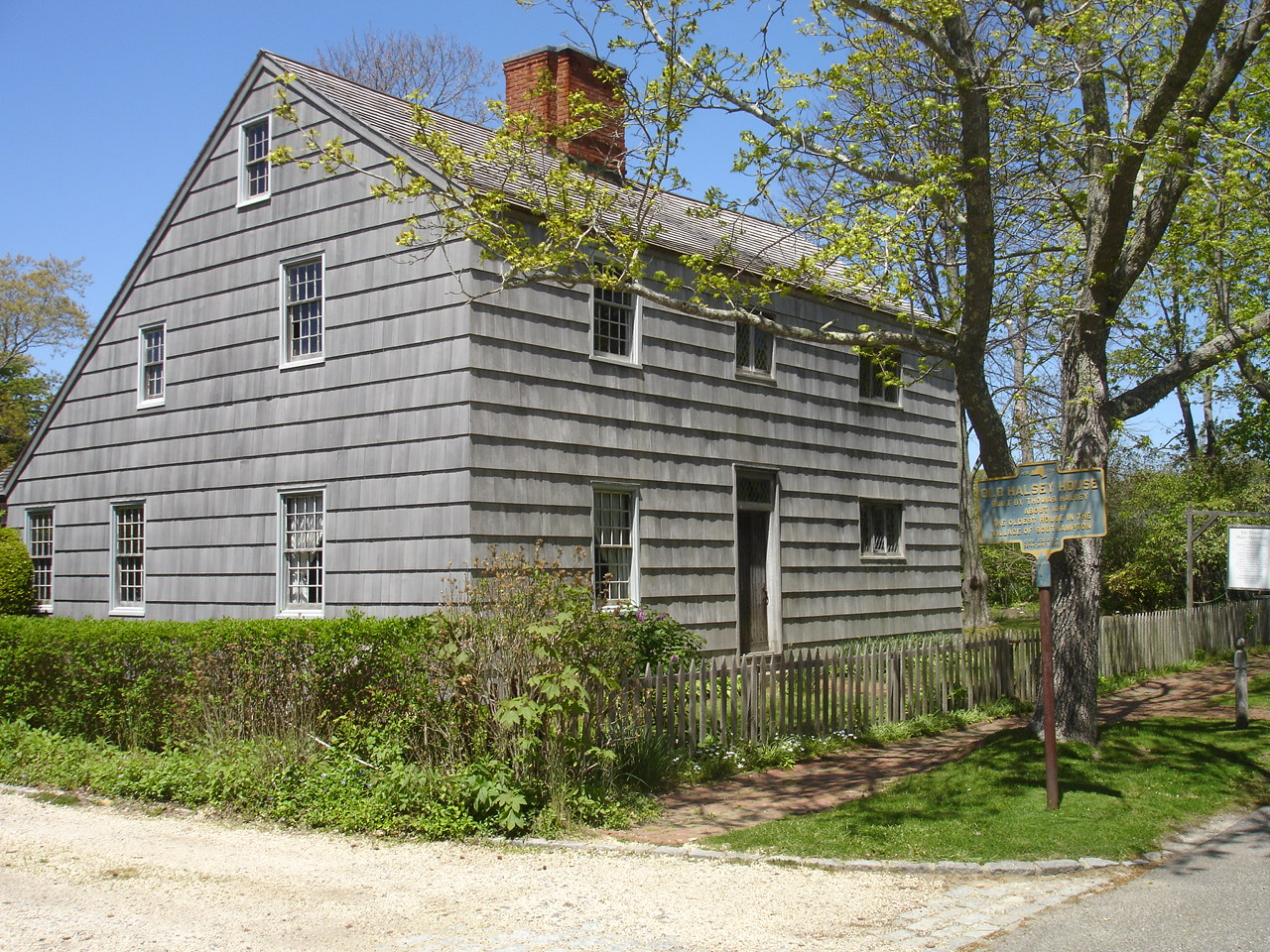
The Old Halsey House in the spring of 2011

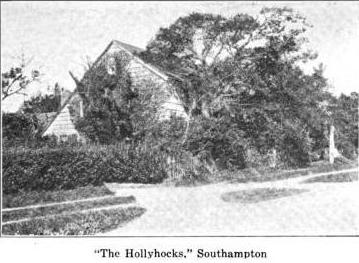
Halsey House in the early twentieth century

The Halsey House is a historic house converted into a museum, in Southampton, New York. It was built circa 1683 by Thomas Halsey Jr., the son of pioneer Thomas Halsey Sr.

The house has been restored, and is open to the public as a museum. It is filled with many of the same items that were owned by Thomas Halsey's family and other artifacts. The collection on display includes 17th- and 18th-century furnishings, a Dominy clock, and a rare 16th-century Breeches Bible, this version speaks of Adam and Eve wearing "breeches made of fig leaves." The Halsey estate in Southampton, New York, includes herb and flower gardens and an orchard that are overseen by the Southampton Colonial Society.

The Halsey House is also a common gathering place for social events and a variety of programs open to the public.

== See also ==
- List of the oldest buildings in New York
