= Brecknock Hall =

Historic house in New York, United States

- U.S. National Register of Historic Places
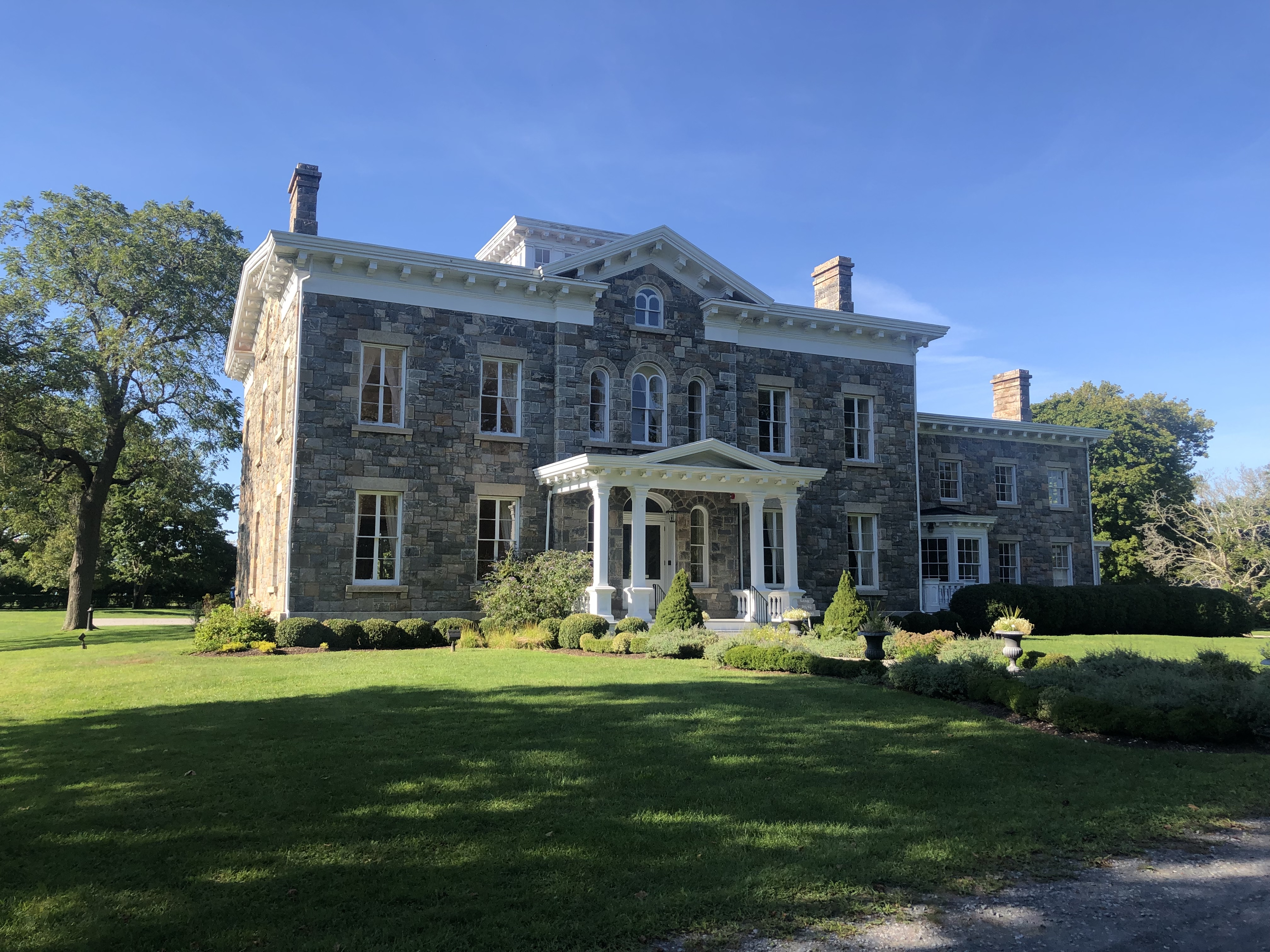
- Breaknock Hall, October 2008

- Location within New York Location within the United States
- Location: North Rd. near Manhassett Ave., Stirling, New York
- Coordinates: 41°7′0″N 72°21′43″W
- Area: 12.8 acres (5.2 ha)
- Built: 1857
- Architect: Robinson, Francis DeLancey
- Architectural style: Italianate
- NRHP reference No.: 05000331
- Added to NRHP: April 22, 2005

Brecknock Hall is a historic home located at Stirling in Suffolk County, New York. It was built in 1857 and is a 2 1/2-story, square cut ashlar stone residence in the Italianate style. The central projecting gable has a one-room sized cupola centrally located on the roof. Also on the property is a 19th-century barn, a small early 20th-century greenhouse, and an early 20th-century caretaker's house.

It was added to the National Register of Historic Places in 2005.

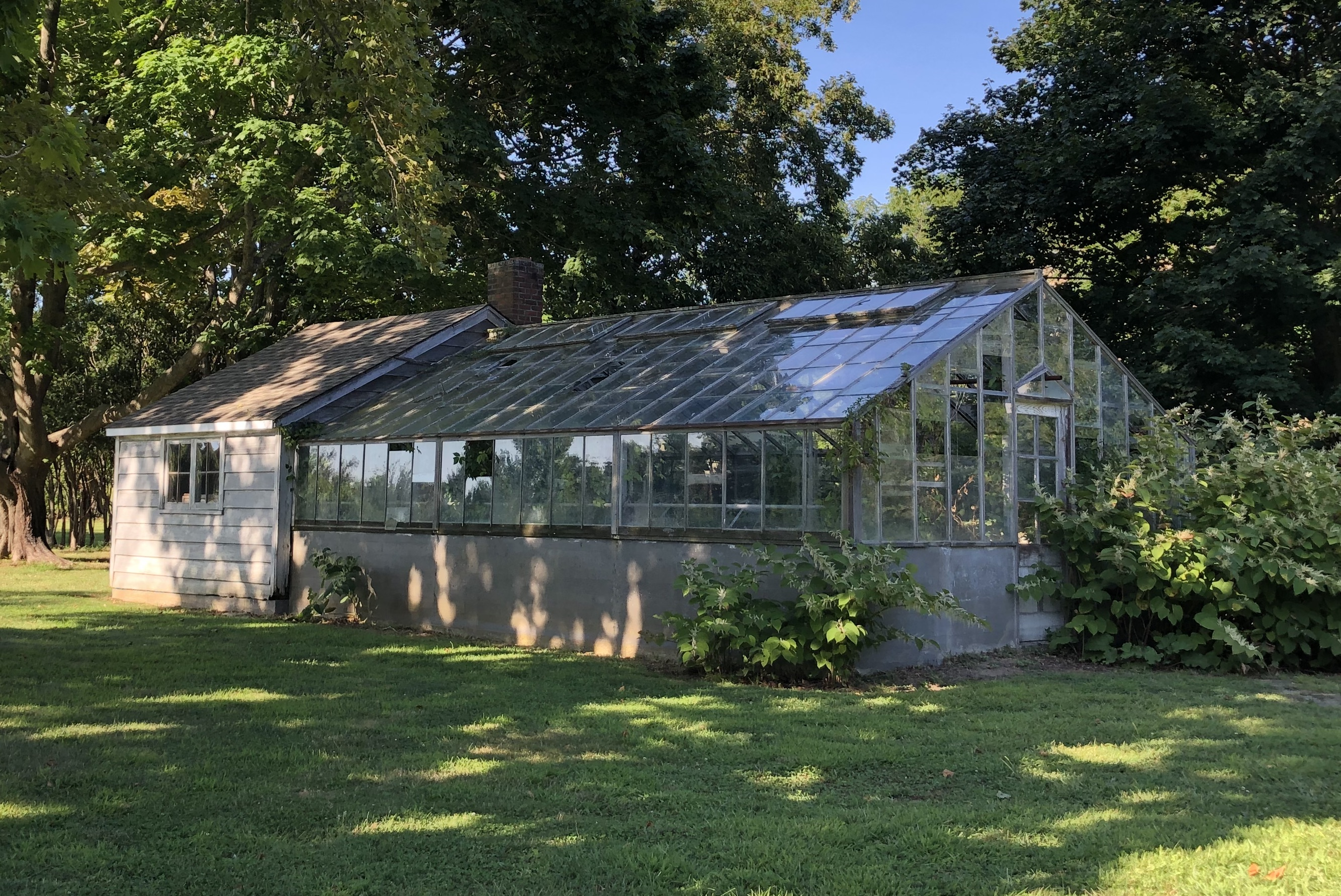
Greenhouse
