= Nathaniel Rogers House =

Historic house in New York, United States

- U.S. National Register of Historic Places
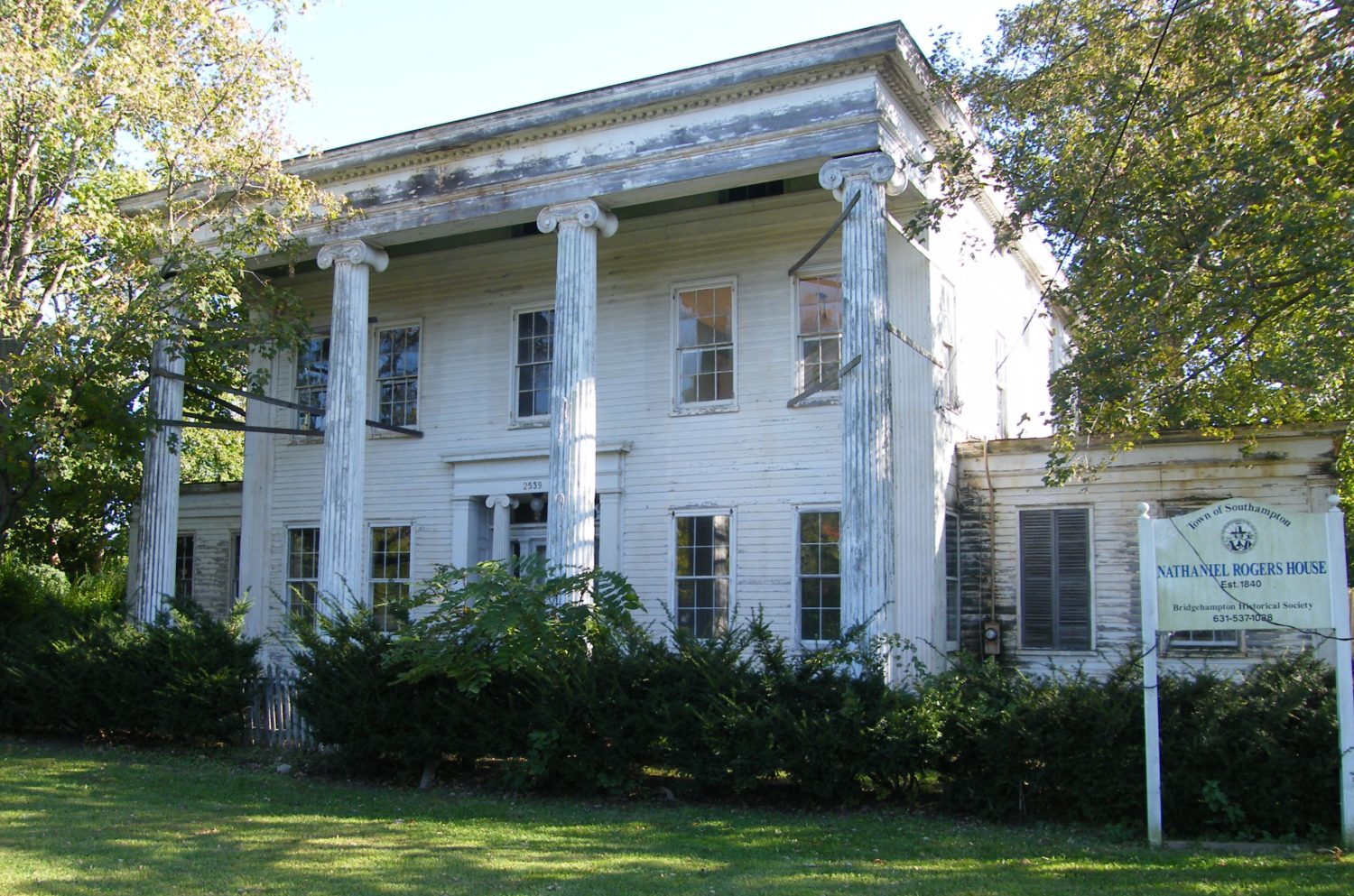
- Nathaniel Rogers House, October 2008

- Location within New York Location within the United States
- Location: 2539 Montauk Hwy., Bridgehampton, New York
- Coordinates: 40°56′15″N 72°18′02″W
- Area: 1.4 acres (0.57 ha)
- Built: 1840
- Architectural style: Greek Revival
- NRHP reference No.: 05000170
- Added to NRHP: March 15, 2005

Nathaniel Rogers House is a historic home located at Bridgehampton in Suffolk County, New York. It is a Greek Revival–style residence that significantly expanded and altered in about 1840. It is a 2 1/2-story temple front and flanking 1-story wings. The entire facade portico has four Ionic order columns supporting a full entablature with no pediment. It once had a cupola and balustrade, but they were removed after the New England Hurricane of 1938. For many years it was operated as a hotel and restaurant named "Hampton House."

It was added to the National Register of Historic Places in 2005.

The house was purchased by the Bridgehampton Historical Society (now The Bridgehampton Museum) and donated to the town of Southampton, New York. The Society plans to renovate the house and use it as its headquarters and for exhibits. The property is named for Nathaniel Rogers, a one time owner of the property.
