= Davis Town Meeting House =

- U.S. National Register of Historic Places
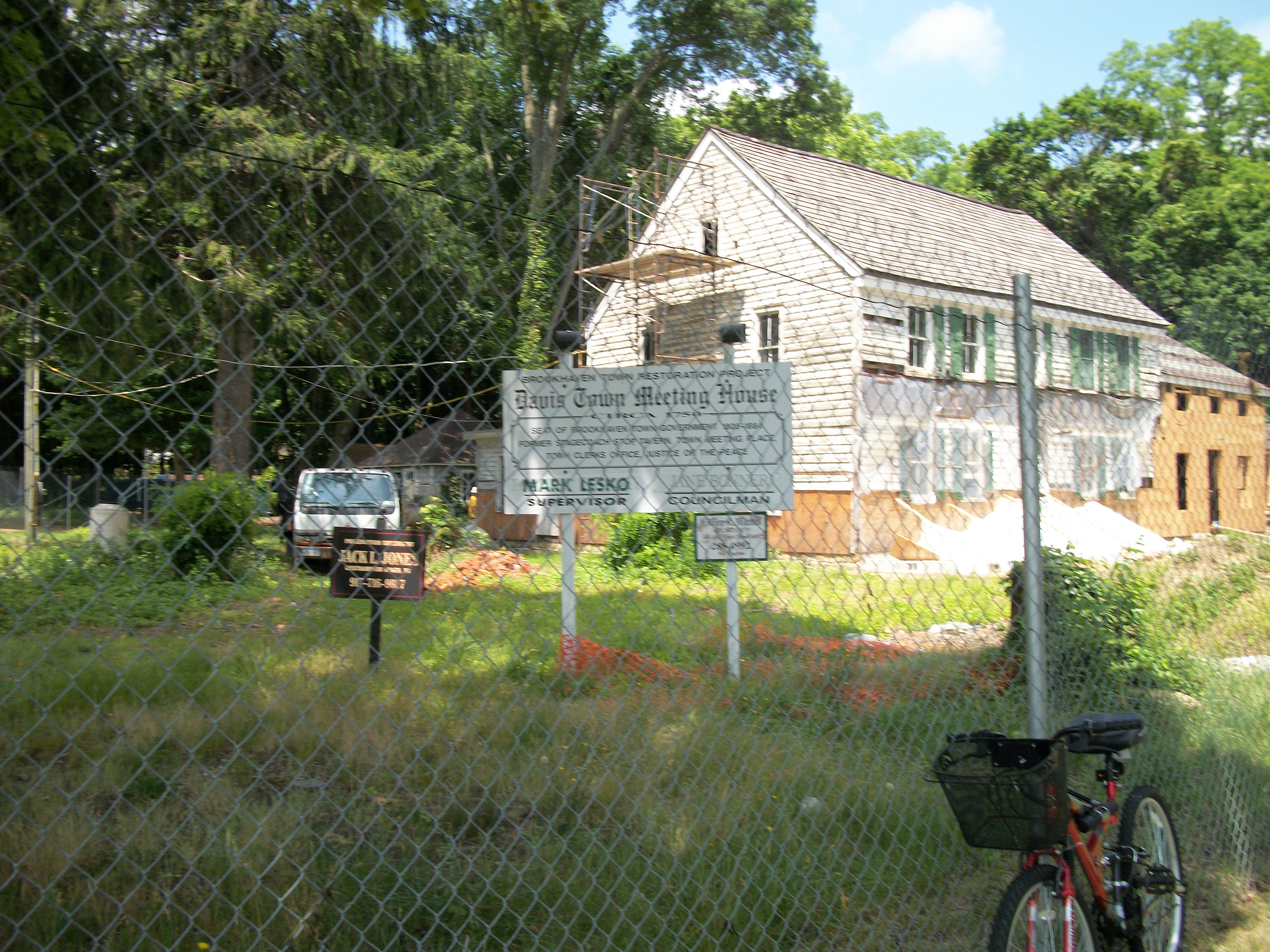
- The Davis Town Meeting House undergoing restoration and reconstruction.

- Location within New York Location within the United States
- Location: North of Middle Country Road, East of Coram-Mt. Sinai Road, Coram, New York
- Coordinates: 40°52′54″N 72°59′1″W
- Area: less than one acre
- Built: 1750s
- Architectural style: Georgian
- NRHP reference No.: 01000850
- Added to NRHP: August 15, 2001

The Davis Town Meeting House (or Lester H. Davis House) is a historic building located in Coram, New York, United States. For most of the 19th century, it served as the town meeting place for the Town of Brookhaven.

== History ==
Constructed around 1750, the original owner of the house was likely Elijah Davis (1727–1802).

In 1790, Brookhaven Town's leaders decided to move the seat of local government from Setauket to the more central location of Coram. Starting about 1800, the Davis home served as the location of the annual April town meeting, and hosted the meeting over 80 times, until 1885, when the town was divided into election districts.

Until the early 2000s, the house was owned almost continuously by direct male descendants of Foulk Davis, who came to Long Island in 1642.

The Brookhaven Town Board designated the house as an official town landmark on April 15, 1986. It was added to the National Register of Historic Places on August 15, 2001. In the fall of 2009, much needed renovation work to the building was begun.
