= Southold Historic District =

Historic district in New York, United States

- U.S. National Register of Historic Places
- U.S. Historic district
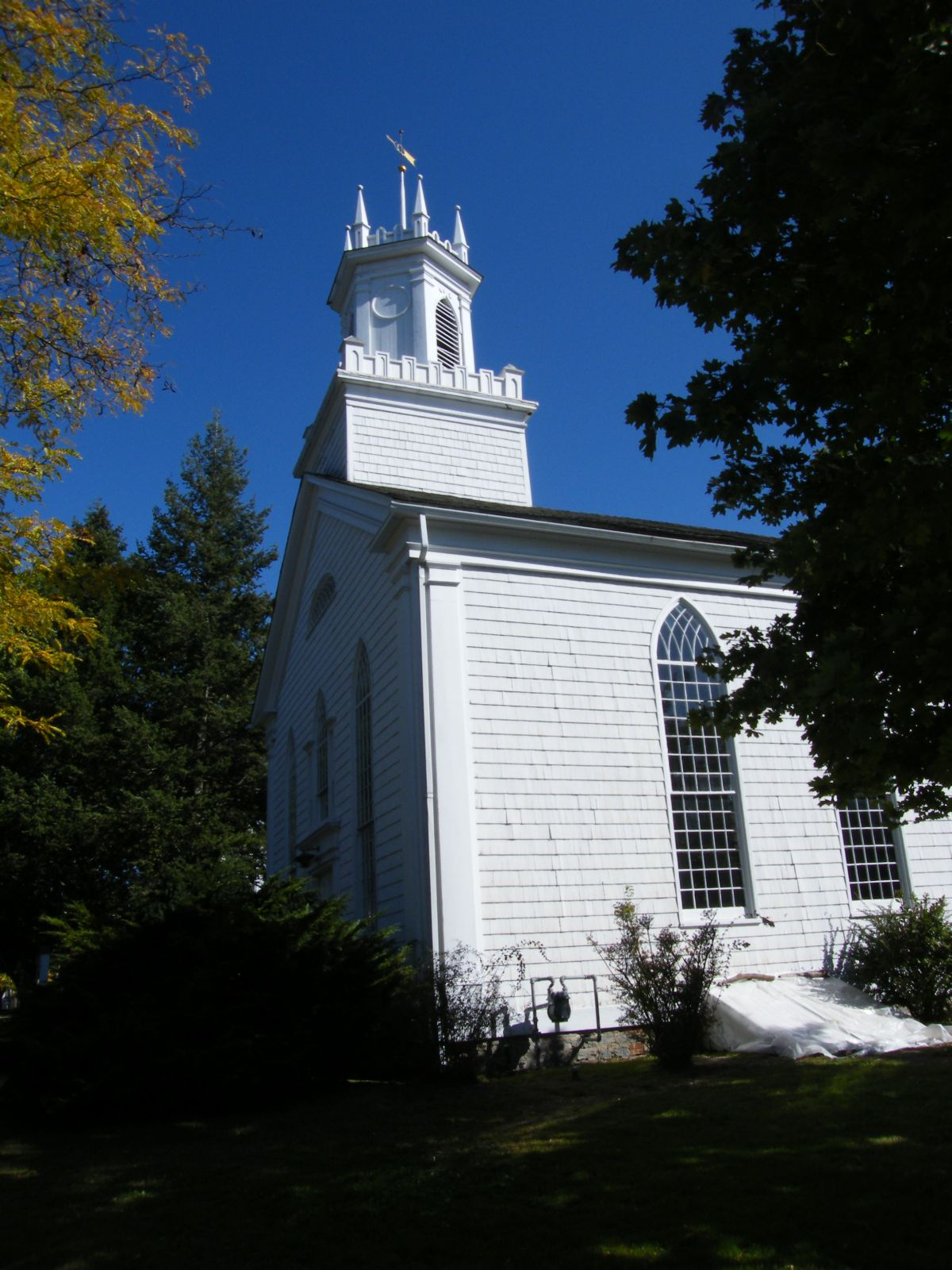
- Southold Universalist Church in Southold Historic District, October 2008

- Location within New York Location within the United States
- Location: Along Main Rd., roughly bounded by Jockey Creek Dr., Griswold St., Long Island RR Tracks, and Wells Rd., Southold, New York
- Coordinates: 41°3′35″N 72°26′1″W
- Area: 60 acres (24 ha)
- Built: 1656
- Architect: Corchan, William D.; Smith, George W.
- Architectural style: Early Republic, Mid 19th Century Revival, Late Victorian
- NRHP reference No.: 97001202
- Added to NRHP: October 14, 1997

Southold Historic District is a national historic district located at the hamlet of Southold in Suffolk County, New York. The district has 86 contributing buildings, one contributing site, and two contributing objects. The majority are residential buildings built either with a heavy timber frame or balloon frame construction and range in date from about 1656 to about 1938. The district also includes three prominent religious facilities and educational facilities.

It was added to the National Register of Historic Places in 1997.
