= Joseph Nelson Hallock House =

Historic house in New York, United States

- U.S. National Register of Historic Places
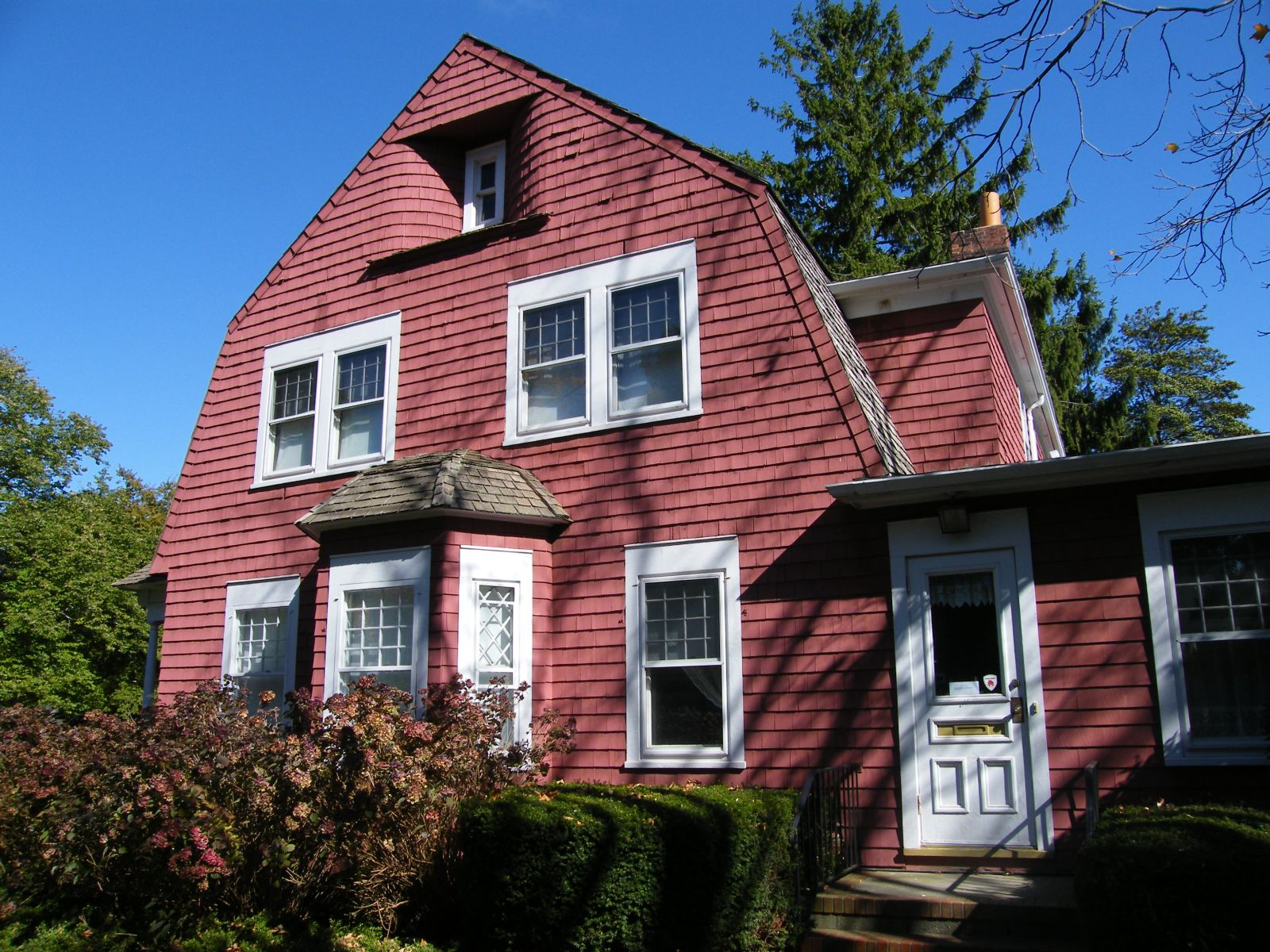
- Joseph Nelson Hallock House, October 2008

- Location within New York Location within the United States
- Location: Main Rd. and Maple Ave., Southold, New York
- Coordinates: 41°3′55″N 72°25′26″W
- Area: less than one acre
- Architect: Higgins, John R.
- Architectural style: Shingle Style
- NRHP reference No.: 05000330
- Added to NRHP: April 22, 2005

Joseph Nelson Hallock House, also known as the Ann Currie-Bell House, is a historic home located at Southold in Suffolk County, New York. It is a two-story, five bay Shingle Style dwelling with a cross gabled, gambrel style cedar shingled roof. It is part of an outdoor museum complex operated by the Southold Historical Society.

The house was built in 1900 for Joseph N. Hallock.

It was added to the National Register of Historic Places in 2005.
