= John Youngs (minister) =

John Youngs (about 1598 in Reydon, England – February 24, 1672 in Southold, New York) was a Puritan minister who founded Southold, New York.

== Life ==
Coat of Arms of John Youngs

John Youngs was born about 1598 in Reydon, England, the first child of the Reverend Christopher Yonges and his wife Margaret (née Ellwyn). Youngs served as a minister at Hingham, Norfolk, England.

In 1637, John Youngs sailed to Salem, Massachusetts aboard the "Mary Anne", with his second wife Joan (née Harris), his five children, and his stepdaughter Anna Palgrave. The family resided in Salem until October 1640, when they crossed Long Island Sound, coming ashore at what is now Founder's Landing at Peconic Bay. There John Youngs founded Southold, the first permanent English settlement in New York. The Native American's name for the area that became Southold was Yennycock.

John Young, of Southold, Long Island, "was appointed a magistrate by Connecticut as early as 1662, to assist the magistrates of South and East- Hampton. The towns of Southold, Huntington, East and Southampton, Oyster Bay and other towns on Long Island, were under the jurisdiction of Connecticut for several years; and the Island was claimed as being within the bounds described in the Charter, as was Rye, Hastings, Westchester, Narragansett, &c., and most of them were organized as towns by order of the General Court of Connecticut, and were represented in the General Assembly of Connecticut for some years, until the bounds of the Colony under the Charter were settled by the King's Commissioners, in 1664-5. On the admission of Southold into the jurisdiction of Connecticut, a petition, signed by said Young, Richard Terre and 22 others, inhabitants of Southold, was presented, all of whom were made freemen of Connecticut. George, 1664. Capt. J. Young was appointed in 1655, to command a vessel for observation, with men from Saybrook and N. London, to prevent Ninegrate's crossing the sound to attack the Indians on Long Island, and in case he did, to destroy his canoes, and kill his men, if possible. John, of Windsor, 1640."

=== Marriages and Children ===
- Joan Herrington (died between 1625 and 1629 in England); married July 25, 1622 in Southwold, England

Children:

- Col. John Youngs (April 10, 1623 in Suffolk, England - April 12, 1698 in Southold, New York), married [1] Mary Gardner; married [2] Anne Wines Nichols Elton Tooker.
- Capt. Thomas Youngs, (May 1, 1625 in Southwold, England - between April and September 1686 in Elizabethtown, New Jersey).

- Joan Harris (died before 1639), the widow of Richard Palgrave; married after 1630 in England.

Children:

- Anna Palgrave (Stepdaughter), married Nicholas Woodbury.
- Mary Youngs (born in England), married Edward Petty.
- Rachel Youngs (born in England).
- Joseph Youngs (in England - about April 1675 in Southold, New York), married Sarah Wines.

- Mary Warren (died 1678 in Southold, New York), married about 1639 in Salem, Massachusetts.

Children:

- Benjamin Youngs (about 1640 in Southold, New York - 1697 in Southold, New York), married Elizabeth.
- Christopher Youngs (about 1642 in Southold, New York - July 31, 1695 in Southold, New York), married [1] Mary; married [2] Mary Budd.
