= Suffolk County Historical Society Building =

- U.S. National Register of Historic Places
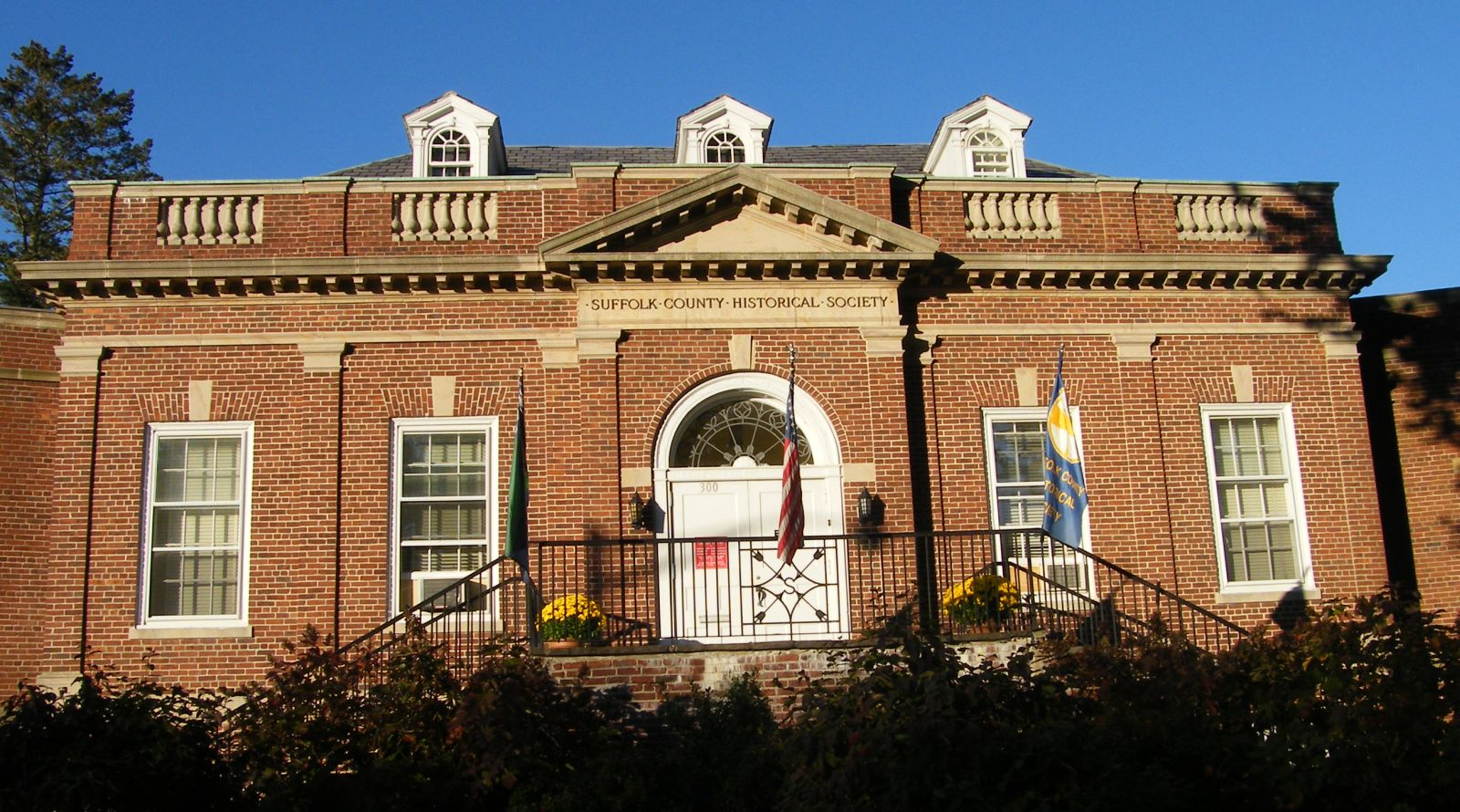

- Location within New York Location within the United States
- Location: 300 West Main Street, Riverhead, Suffolk County, New York, USA
- Coordinates: 40°55′4.73″N 72°40′5.41″W
- Built: c.1925-1930
- Architect: August Galow
- Architectural style: Colonial Revival
- NRHP reference No.: 94000786
- Added to NRHP: July 29, 1994

Suffolk County Historical Society Building is a museum and library dedicated to preserving historic artifacts of Suffolk County, New York, as well as other parts of Long Island. It is located at 300 West Main Street as well as Osborn Avenue and Court Street in Riverhead, New York.

Though the museum building itself has only been around since 1930, the Suffolk County Historical Society was established in 1886 by residents of the county who were concerned about preserving its heritage. Riverhead was chosen as the location of the new society because it's the County Seat of Suffolk County, and County Surrogate Judge James H. Tuthill became the first President. The society began collecting items almost immediately, and the first displays were placed in a small glass case in Tuthill's Riverhead office. Unfortunately, the collection soon outgrew the Judge's office, and in 1893 a small building at the corner of Griffing Avenue and Main Street in Riverhead, which formerly housed the County Clerk's Office, was purchased. Eventually, the growing collection of documents and artifacts outgrew that space too.

The building was designed by August Galow with Colonial Revival styling. It was built on land donated by Alice O. Perkins, the widow of prominent Riverhead resident John Perkins during the 1920s, and was completed in 1930. Extensions were added in 1951 and 1964.

The library boasts more than 20,000 volumes and over 840 cubic feet (24 m^{3}) of manuscripts, including records, ledgers, diaries, maps, atlases, post cards, newspapers, and other paperwork. In 1994, the building was listed on the National Register of Historic Places.

== Suffolk County Historical Society Museum ==
The museum's collection included Native American artifacts, farm implements, whaling tools, fine arts, antique furniture, household ceramics, guns from the Civil War and other periods, and a Transport Exhibit containing horse-drawn wagons, sleighs, carriages, bicycles, and even a 1905 Curved Dash Oldsmobile.

The museum and library continue to serve as a vital resource for people who are interested in the history of Suffolk County.
