= Southold Union Free School District =

School district in the U.S. state of New York

Location
- 420 Oaklawn Avenue Southold, New York United States

District information
- Type: Public School District
- Motto: "Make it a good day or not, the choice is up to you."
- Grades: PreK - 12
- Superintendent: Anthony Mauro
- Schools: Southold Elementary School, Southold Jr/Sr High School
- Budget: $34,532,000 (2024-2025)

Students and staff
- Students: 728 (As of 2/9/2022)
- Teachers: 46
- Staff: 59
- District mascot: The Settler
- Colors: Red, white, and grey

Other information
- Website: www.southoldufsd.com

Southold Union Free School District is a public school district located on the North Fork of Long Island, in Suffolk County, New York, United States. It serves the central portion of the Town of Southold, including the majority of the census-designated place (CDP) of Southold, as well as the eastern portion of the CDP of Peconic. To the east, the district is bordered by the Greenport Union Free School District; and on the west, the Mattituck-Cutchogue Union Free School District.

The total enrollment for the 2017–2018 school year was 766 students.

In the winter of 2020, tenured Superintendent David Gamberg announced his retirement from Southold School District and neighboring Greenport School District effective in June 2020. He was then replaced by now-superintendent Anthony Mauro.

== Schools ==
=== Southold Junior Senior High School ===
For grades 7 through 12, this school also educates students from the small adjacent New Suffolk school district.

School officials include

- Superintendent: Dr. Anthony Mauro
- Principal: Dr. Terence Rusch
- Athletic Director and Dean of Students: Steven Flanagan

=== Southold Elementary School ===
School officials include

- Principal: Diana Tonne

== SOHO TV ==
In 2013 the district launched a program called "SOHO TV" which has seen widespread acclaim throughout its existence. Since the program's conception they have completed 150+ episodes airing weekly on Fridays. The program has also recently worked with Stony Brook University for the Broadcast Awards for Senior High (BASH Awards).
