= Hallock Homestead =

Historic house in New York, United States

- U.S. National Register of Historic Places
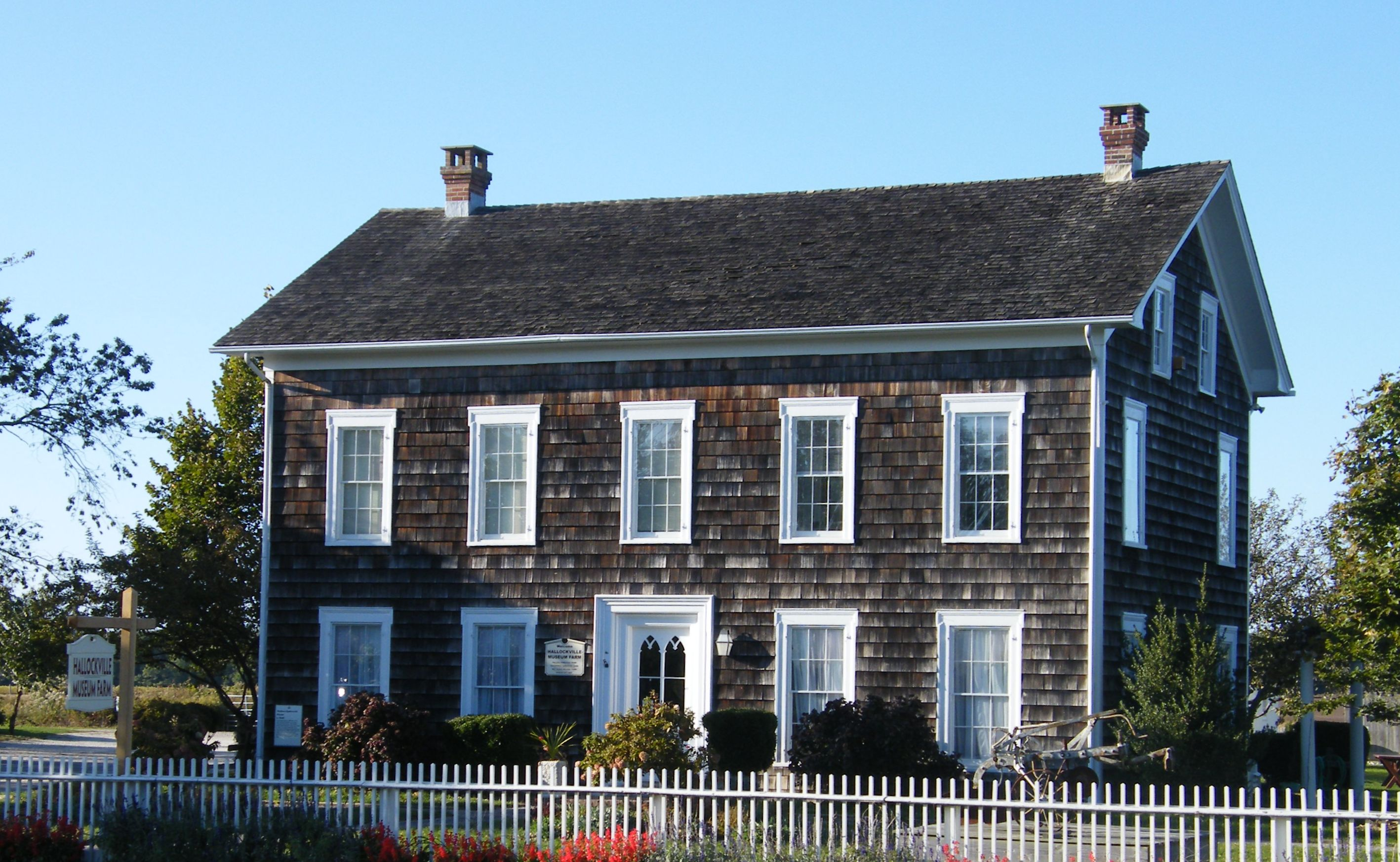
- Hallock Homestead, October 2008

- Location within New York Location within the United States
- Location: 6038 Sound Ave., Northville, New York
- Coordinates: 40°59′2″N 72°35′12″W
- Area: 2.6 acres (1.1 ha)
- Built: 1765
- NRHP reference No.: 84002992
- Added to NRHP: June 07, 1984

Hallock Homestead is a historic farm complex located at Northville in Suffolk County, New York. The farmstead includes five contributing buildings: the main house, barn, milk house, shop / wood house, and privy. The farmhouse was originally built in 1765 as a one-story, five bay structure with a central chimney. In 1833, a small room was added to the west side and in 1845, the original dwelling was raised to two stories and capped with a broad gable roof.

It was added to the National Register of Historic Places in 1984.

== See also ==
- Hallock State Park Preserve
