= Jesse and Ira Tuthill House =

Historic house in New York, United States

- U.S. National Register of Historic Places
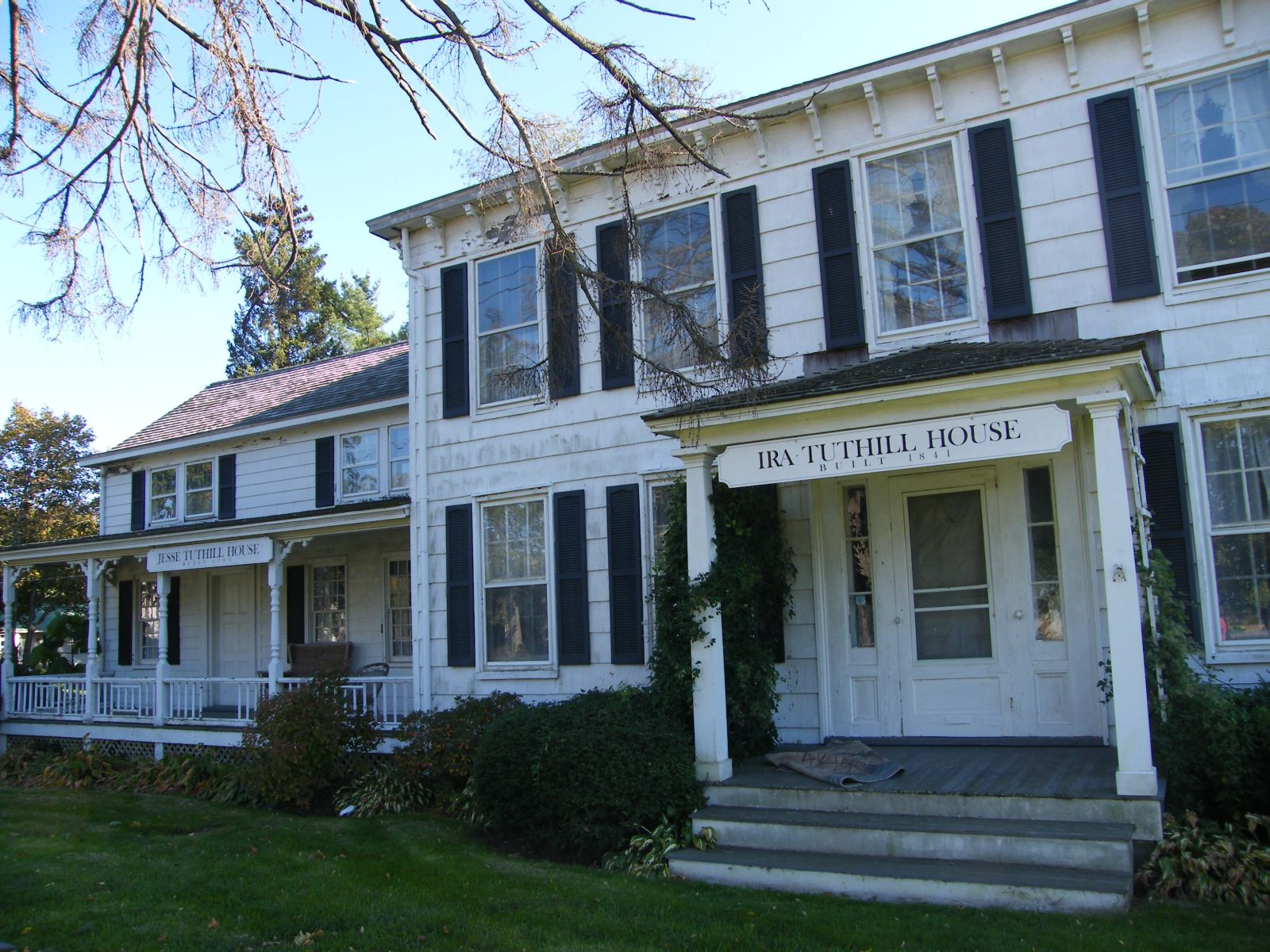
- Jesse and Ira Tuthill Residence, October 2008

- Location within New York Location within the United States
- Location: Main Rd. and Cardinal Dr., Mattituck, New York
- Coordinates: 40°59′49″N 72°31′11″W
- Area: 1.9 acres (0.77 ha)
- Built: 1841
- Architectural style: Greek Revival
- NRHP reference No.: 06000158
- Added to NRHP: March 22, 2006

Jesse and Ira Tuthill House is a historic home located at Mattituck in Suffolk County, New York. It was built in two stages, 1799 and 1841. The original two-room house was incorporated as a 1 1/2-story wing for the larger 2-story, nine-room house. The final 1841 house is a 2 1/2-story residence with a modestly pitched gable roof with a wide frieze running beneath the roof eave.

It was added to the National Register of Historic Places in 2006.

The Mattituck-Laurel Historical Society owns the 1799 Jesse Tuthill House and 1841 Ira Tuthill House and operates them as period historic house museums.
