= Samuel Landon House =

Historic house in New York, United States

- U.S. National Register of Historic Places
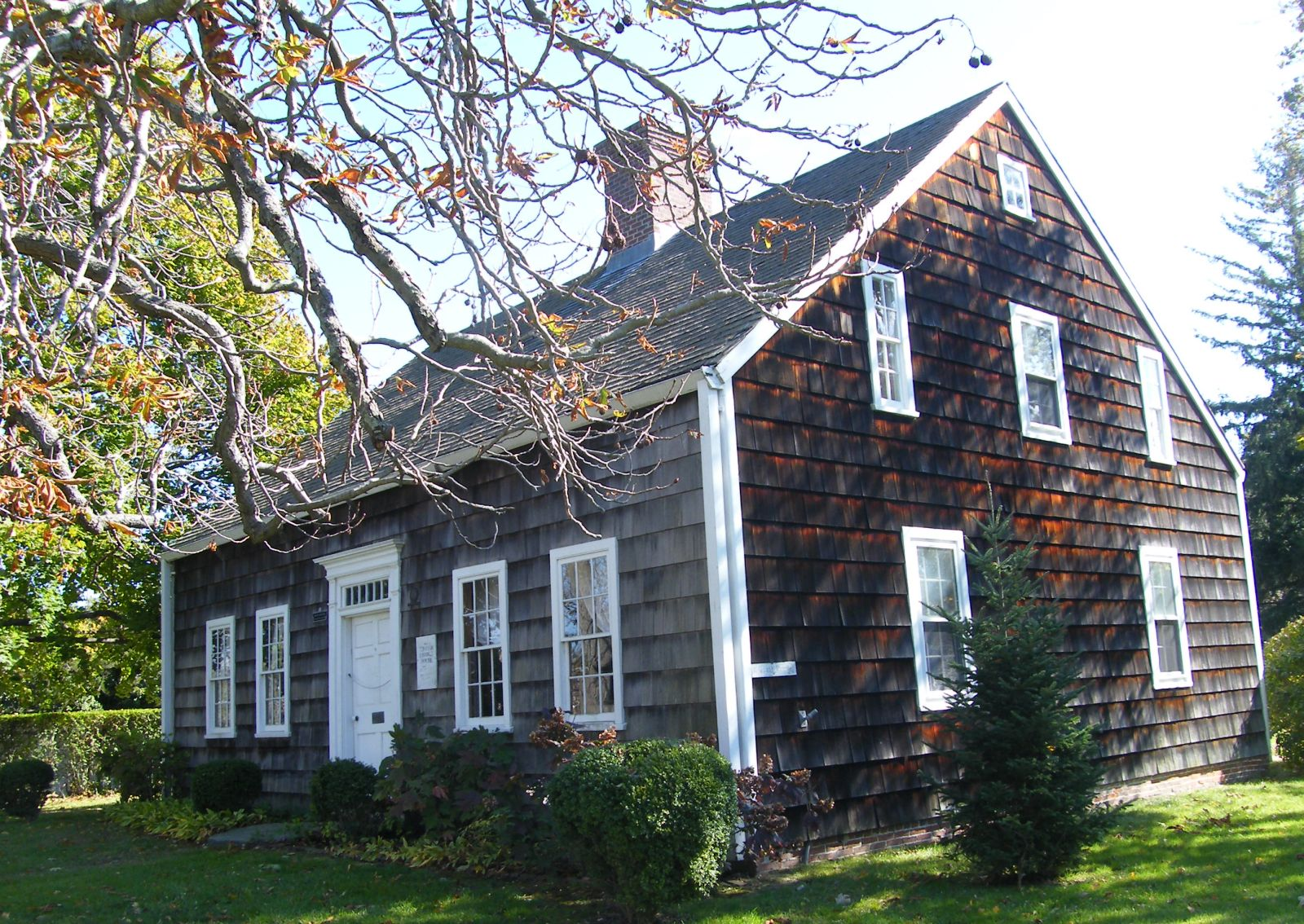
- Samuel Landon House, October 2008

- Location within New York Location within the United States
- Location: Main Rd Bet. Hobart Rd. and Maple Ln., Southold, New York
- Coordinates: 41°3′57″N 72°25′25″W
- Area: less than one acre
- Architect: Landon, Samuel
- Architectural style: Colonial
- NRHP reference No.: 05000329
- Added to NRHP: April 20, 2005

Samuel Landon House, also known as the Thomas Moore House, is a historic home located in Southold in Suffolk County, New York. It is an L-shaped, 1 1/2-story, five-bay, New England Colonial–style residence with a central fireplace and a cross-gabled roof. It is part of a museum complex operated by the Southold Historical Society. In 2019, Southold Historical Society installed a permanent exhibition titled "Slavery in Southold" in the Samuel Landon House. Five enslaved people lived in the house circa 1760.

It was added to the National Register of Historic Places in 2005.
