= Henry W. Prince Building =

Historic commercial building in New York, United States

- U.S. National Register of Historic Places
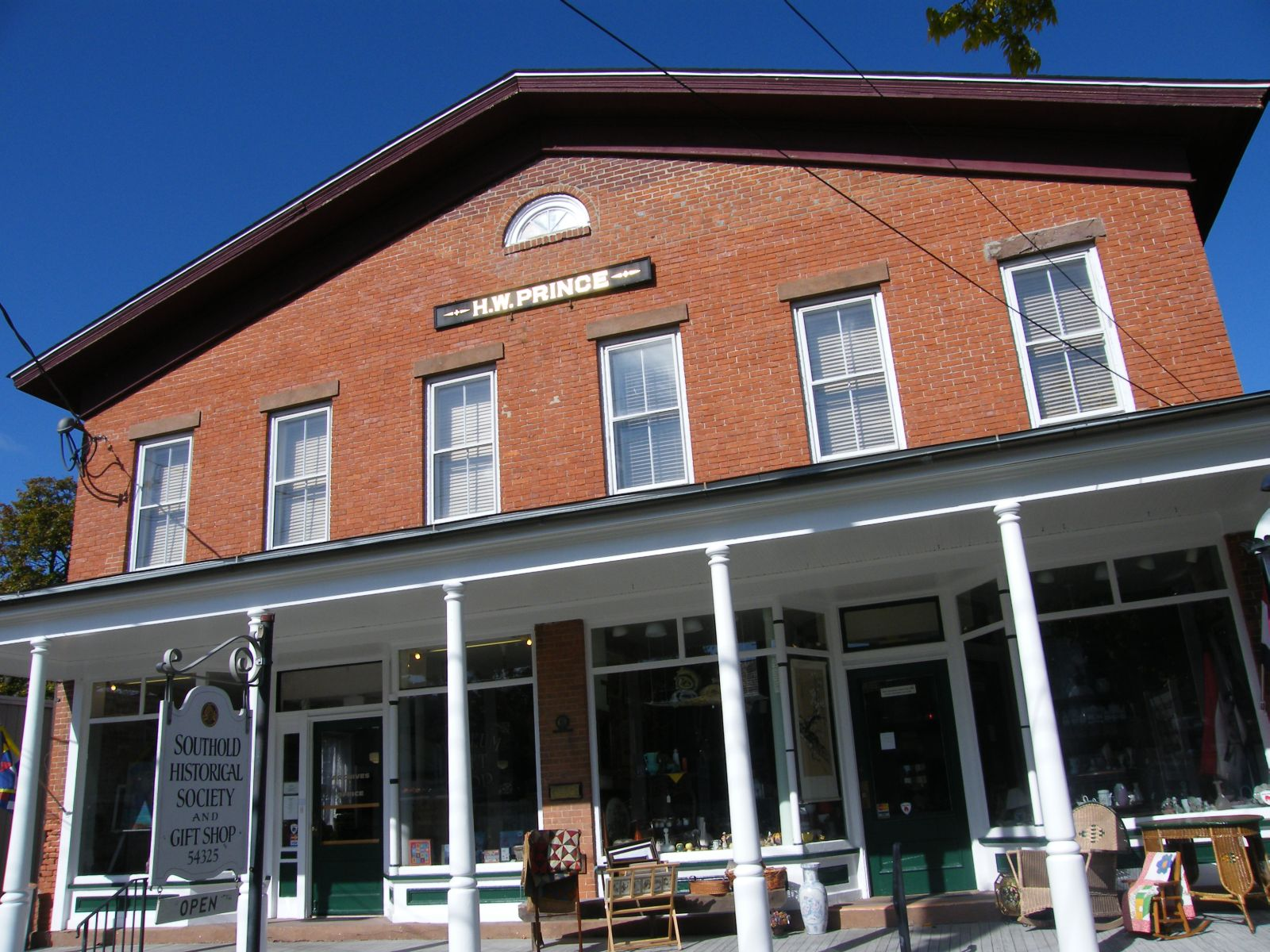
- Henry W. Prince Building, October 2008

- Location within New York Location within the United States
- Location: 54325 Main Rd., Southold, New York
- Coordinates: 41°3′53″N 72°25′40″W
- Area: less than one acre
- Architectural style: Early Commercial
- NRHP reference No.: 05000091
- Added to NRHP: February 24, 2005

The Henry W. Prince Building, also known as Prince Store, is a historic commercial building located at Southold in Suffolk County, New York. It was built in 1874 and is a two-story, six-bay brick building with a front gabled roof. The building is currently owned by the Southold Historical Society and its affiliated gift shop. It was added to the National Register of Historic Places in 2005.
