= Huntington Union Free School District =

School district in the U.S. state of New York

Location
- Huntington, Suffolk County, New York; United States
- Coordinates: 40.8551°N 73.4156°W

District information
- Type: Public
- Motto: A Tradition of Excellence since 1657
- Grades: K–12
- Established: 1657
- Superintendent: Beth McCoy
- Asst. superintendent(s): Christopher Hender, Dr. Rubie Harris
- Schools: 8
- NCES District ID: 3615090

Students and staff
- Students: 4,136
- District mascot: Blue Devils
- Colors: Navy and white

Other information
- District Offices: 50 Tower Street Huntington Station, New York 11746
- Website: www.hufsd.edu

The Huntington Union Free School District (often abbreviated as HUFSD) is a school district in the Town of Huntington in Suffolk County, New York on the North Shore of Long Island. It serves the entirety of the hamlet of Halesite and the village of Huntington Bay, and parts of four hamlets; large parts of Huntington and Huntington Station, and slivers of Cold Spring Harbor and West Hills.

== History ==
=== Official formation of the district and before ===
The district has a very storied and old history, dating back to 1657. The very first school that would one day result in the Huntington Union Free School District of today was set up by members of the community in a home. Shortly thereafter in 1660, the first schoolhouse was built. In 1763, what was the predecessor of today's school district's school board was formed. In 1793, what was then the Huntington Academy was opened on what is today 100 Main Street in Huntington and the Huntington Town Hall. The Huntington Academy was a private school which was open for over half a century, before being torn down in favor of the new Union School. Opening in 1858, it was open for fifty years and experienced great growth over the following decades. It became the first Huntington High School, serving students up to 17 years old and officially changed the name to Huntington High School in 1897. In 1857, the year before the opening of the Union School, the district was officially formed. They received the "Huntington Union Free School District" name nine years later in 1866.

=== History since district creation and naming ===
The Main Street School was built in 1898. It was a K-8 grammar school for over 50. The Sewing and Trade Building (also on Main Street) was primarily a private school, but did house several kindergarten classes for the district. The primary School Street School opened in 1906, but closed just seven years later. Two years after School Street, the one room Halesite School on O'Hara Street opened. Built in 1909 and 1910, the original Huntington High School (Union School) was replaced by a new Huntington High School right where the Union School stood. It would be the high school of the district from 1910 to 1958. The Lowndes Avenue School was the first school in the district in Huntington Station, serving students K-8. It opened in 1913, replacing the School Street School in the district. Woodbury Avenue School was originally a K-8 school as well, with construction being completed in 1924. Lincoln School was yet another school that was originally K-8 but became K-6 later on, and was built in 1923. All three schools; Lowndes Avenue, Woodbury Avenue, and Lincoln would all serve the district for over forty years before all three were closed in the late 1960s and early 1970s. The Lowndes Avenue School was renamed the Roosevelt School in 1927 and later became a K-6 school, like Woodbury did in 1939.The name was changed to R.L. Simpson High School after 1950, and starting in 1952 the Main Street School served as an annex. It closed in 1958, due to the opening of the modern Huntington High School. before reopening as R.L. Simpson Junior High School in 1961 before its closure in 1976. This site was used as a school in Huntington at different points over a span of nearly 200 years. It had been Huntington Academy, Union School, Huntington High School, R.L. Simpson High School, and R. L. Simpson Junior High School before becoming Huntington Town Hall. In 1928, the Nathan Hale School opened in Halesite as a K-6 school, meaning the district was able to close the Sewing and Trade Building, which would one day serve as the district offices. In 1939, Robert K. Toaz Junior High, the very first junior high school in Suffolk County, opened. It was named after a past superintendent of the district and closed in 1982. Village Green was a K-6 that served the district from 1952 to 1973. Flower Hill, Southdown, and Washington all opened in 1954 and are still used by the district today. Nearby Jefferson would open in 1962 and is also still around. All four schools opened originally as K-6 and are now the district's K-3 schools. The current Huntington High School opened in 1958. J. Taylor Finley Junior High opened in 1965 and once was also an elementary school. It is still used by the district as well. Woodhull opened in 1967 as yet another K-6 building, and is a 4-6 one today. Huntington Elementary temporarily housed students from Toaz Junior High while it was being renovated in 1969–1970.

=== Students from other districts ===
Due to the district being one of the earliest formed in the area, the district received students from several other growing ones for many years. Prior to the opening of the South Huntington Union Free School District's first high school, the Central School, students in the district attended Huntington High School. This was between 1924 (the start of the district) and 1931 (the year of the first Central School graduation class). Before the formation of the modern Harborfields Central School District, students from Centerport and Greenlawn got their secondary education from the district until Huntington was overwhelmed and could no longer withstand them, kickstarting the process that formed the modern Harborfields district forming in 1956. A very similar situation occurred with the modern Cold Spring Harbor Central School District, where before its formation students would go to one of three high schools after eighth grade: Huntington High School (known as Simpson at the time), Walt Whitman High School, or Oyster Bay High School, depending on where they lived. Again, the district could not handle these students anymore, causing the modern Cold Spring Harbor district to form in 1958. Before 1962, students in the Elwood Union Free School District went to Huntington for grades 9-12 too, due to the district not having their own high school. Some students in the district of high school age at the time also went to Northport High School and Kings Park High School. This ended after the opening of Elwood-John H. Glenn High School in 1962.

== Schools ==
The following is a table of all the schools served by the Huntington Union Free School District.

School name	Type of school	Address	Grades	Principal
Huntington High School	High School	188 Oakwood Road Huntington, NY 11743	9-12	Rochelle C. Brown
Finley Middle School	Middle School	20 Greenlawn Road Huntington, NY 11743	7-8	Traci Roethel
Woodhull Intermediate School	Intermediate School	140 Woodhull Road Huntington, NY 11743	4-6	Stephanie Campbell
Jack Abrams STEM Magnet	Intermediate School	155 Lowndes Avenue Huntington Station, NY 11746	4-6	Donna Moro
Flower Hill Primary School	Elementary School	98 Flower Hill Road Huntington, NY 11743	K-3	Cindy Siegel
Jefferson Primary School	Elementary School	253 Oakwood Road Huntington, NY 11743	K-3	Valerie Capitulo-Saide
Southdown Primary School	Elementary School	125 Browns Road Huntington, NY 11743	K-3	Jill Amott-Erwig
Washington Primary School	Elementary School	78 Whitson Road Huntington Station, NY 11746	K-3	Dr. Michelle J. Richards

== Academics ==
The district is known for its diverse population and its broad-ranging academic and extracurricular programs, including widely recognized programs in the arts and athletics. The district has greatly expanded its STEM initiatives during the past few years, including the STEM Magnet School program and a middle school STEM enrichment program. The district also features an expanding and inclusive science research program at Huntington High School, which produced a Intel Science Talent Search winner in 2014. The elementary dual-language program is another popular option for elementary parents and students and is available to students entering Kindergarten.
