= Elwood Union Free School District =

School district in the U.S. state of New York

Location
- Elwood, Suffolk County, New York; United States

District information
- Type: Public
- Motto: A Focused Future
- Grades: K-12
- Established: 1903; 123 years ago
- Superintendent: TBD
- Schools: 4

Students and staff
- Enrollment: 1,979
- District mascot: Knights
- Colors: Royal Blue and White

Other information
- District Offices: Elwood Middle School 100 Kenneth Avenue Greenlawn, NY 11740
- Website: www.elwoodufsd.org

Elwood Union Free School District is a public school district in New York, United States. It is in the Town of Huntington and serves residents in the hamlet of Elwood and parts of the hamlet Greenlawn.

The district includes one primary school, which teaches Kindergarten to 2nd grade (Harley Avenue Primary School), one intermediate school, which teaches 3rd to 5th grade (James H. Boyd Intermediate School), a middle school (Elwood Middle School), and a high school (Elwood-John H. Glenn High School).

== History ==
=== Early district history and schools ===
In 1869, a one-room schoolhouse was built in Elwood. This was the very first school in the area. The district was established in 1903 with the start of the construction of the Elwood School on Cuba Hill Road (affectionately called the "Little Red Schoolhouse"), which operated as the sole school in the district for decades. The school would finally open in 1915, and it had two stories, a stage, and a library. The school did not have a cafeteria. It is now owned by the Suffolk County Historic Trust and is very rundown. Cuba Hill School, which today is James H. Boyd School, opened further down the road in 1955, and Manor Plains School opened on Little Plains Road in 1957. Elwood-John Glenn High School was constructed in 1962, followed by Harley Avenue School in 1966, and finally Elwood Middle School in 1968. Before the opening of John Glenn, high school aged students in Elwood went to Northport, Kings Park, or Huntington for high school. As of 2024, the district actively uses four of the six total schools. The Elwood School has stood abandoned since 2003, and Manor Plains School has been converted into the Western Suffolk BOCES: Wilson Technological Center.

=== Merger attempts ===
Due to the Elwood Union Free School District being very small, the district has made many attempts at merging with surrounding districts. They have attempted to merge with every district they border, having sent proposals for merger in late 2010 and early 2011 to Northport-East Northport, Half Hollow Hills, Commack, South Huntington, and Harborfields. Harborfields was likely the most probable candidate, as they are the smallest bordering district, and they also tried to merge with Harborfields in 1992. The attempt at a Elwood-Harborfields merger in 2010 was turned away by Harborfields superintendent Frank Carasiti, who had been a key player in Long Island schools for nearly 50 years and has a Rocky Point school named after him. There were also attempts at merging with Commack in the 1960s, and other merger efforts were made in 1988. None of Elwood's many attempts to merge were ever accepted, and the district has stayed with its current configuration and zoning since.

== Academics ==
Elwood School District has a history of academic success, with many students receiving Regents diplomas and recognition by the National Merit Program. In 2018, Elwood-John H. Glenn High School was honored as a National Blue Ribbon school. The district features modern facilities and offers a diverse range of programs, including Advanced Placement courses and special education services, catering to the needs of all students. 36 students of Elwood-John Glenn High School were honored by College Board as AP scholars in October 2025. The district has hosted various significant events, such as Career Day in partnership with Suffolk County District Attorney Ray Tierney's office, allowing students to explore different career paths.
