= Commack School District =

Public school district in New York state

Commack Union Free School District
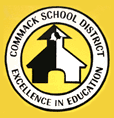

Location
- Commack Long Island Suffolk County, New York; United States
- Coordinates: 40.8666°N 73.2920°W

District information
- Type: Public school district
- Motto: "Excellence in Education"
- Grades: KG-12
- Established: 1899
- Superintendent: Jordan Cox
- Schools: 9
- Budget: $233,035,125 (for 2025-2026)
- NCES District ID: 3608130

Students and staff
- Students: 5,518 (as of 2023–2024)
- Teachers: 468.23 FTE (as of 2023–2024)
- Student–teacher ratio: 11.78%
- District mascot: Cougars
- Colors: Gold and black

Other information
- Website: www.commack.k12.ny.us www.commackschools.org

Commack Union Free School District is a public school district located in Suffolk County, New York, United States near the North Shore of Long Island. The district straddles the towns of Huntington and Smithtown, with Townline Road as the dividing line. It serves the vast majority of Commack as well as parts of Dix Hills and Hauppauge. It served approximately 6,000 students during the 2018–2019 school year. There are four primary schools (grades K–2), two intermediate schools (grades 3–5), one middle school (grades 6–8) and one high school (grades 9–12).

== History ==
=== First Commack school district ===
The first ever predecessor to the modern Commack School District was originally formed in 1814, at a historic Commack building lost to time. Known at different points as the Woodhull Tavern or the Goldsmith Hotel, it burned to the ground in 1895. Today, there is a building in Commack also known as the Woodhull Tavern on Veterans Memorial Highway in Commack. The first school in Commack was on Burr Road, and was there during the founding of the district in 1814. Burr Road was named for the Burr family, who would be major players in early Commack Schools history. The original Commack schoolhouse was moved behind the property of Caleb Smith after its closure in 1844, Caleb being a member of the Smith family who had founded Smithtown many years before. The district was reorganized in 1844, and at this point the early district utilized two schools, North and South. The mistress of the North School was Minnie Van Brunt, the final Van Brunt to live at the Van Brunt Mansion on Harned Road and future teacher in the modern district. The South School was located near the modern Commack Public Library, and both the South and North schools were used until the forming of the modern district in 1899.

=== Formation and early history ===
The Commack School District was originally formed in 1899, through the combination of District #10 and District #18. Both districts had just a single schoolhouse, both of which also being just one room. They were separated by Jericho Turnpike, as District #10 served north of Jericho Turnpike and District #18 served south of Jericho Turnpike. The original name of the district was Comac School District #10, Comac being the spelling of the hamlet known as Commack today. Marion Carll, a major player in Commack history who had a school named after her, believes this is because of being repeatedly confused for Coram, and adding letters helped to differentiate the two. Carll would go on to be a treasurer, census taker, PTA president, and teacher in the district. The first school owned by the district was the Frame School, with the initial land purchase approved by the first Commack Board of Education. The three trustees on the first Board of Education of Commack were Carll S. Burr Jr. (who attended the North School), John C. Hubbs, and Herbert J. Harned. The Burr, Hubbs, and Harned families would all go on to be very impactful in the history of Commack and Commack schools. Carll S. Burr Jr. would purchase the original Commack school building used in the early 1800s from the Smith family in 1904. Burr Road is also named after the Burr family, and it is widely agreed upon that the Burrs were incredibly influential in the early development of the Commack community. The old Burr horse racing track is today the site of Commack High School. Harned Road, where the Van Brunt Mansion was located, is named after the Harned family. The current administration center is also named after a Hubbs. The Frame School was on Jericho Turnpike, and had two stories with one room on each. It was called the "Frame" school because of its wooden frame. The school served children grades 1–8, with one floor having students 1-4 and the other 5–8. Minnie Van Brunt, former mistress of the North School, became principal of the Frame School in 1907 and had already taught at the North and Frame school for many years. The Frame School served Commack until 1923. The Commack Grammar School was built in 1923, opened the following year, and was later named Turnpike School and finally the Marion E. Carll school in 1957. It served Commack for many years before it was purchased in 1973 by the New York Institute of Technology. The Frame School was sold to the Commack Hook and Ladder Company in 1924. for $5. The Commack Grammar School was the sole school in the district for 34 years. It had many new wings added to during its time serving Commack, along with having a library and auditorium. Grace L. Hubbs, who would also have a school named after her in the future, taught at the school for nearly 40 years. A member of the Harned family (Charles), who Harned Road is named after, also taught there. The former Marion E. Carll School building was demolished in 1990. In 1948, the district became Union Free, meaning it could have a high school. However, the district was not permitted by the state to get one until the mid-1960s.

=== Extreme growth ===
A tremendous boom in population occurred due to events like World War II in the 1950s and 1960s. Commack went from just a single school until 1958 to 17 in 1966 just 8 years later. It became greatly urbanized during this time and there was a mix of farm and city people in Commack. The schools that opened in this time are: Winnecomac, Cedar Road, Green Fields, Wood Park, North Ridge, South Ridge, Old Farms, Circle Hill, Long Acres, Green Meadows Junior High, and Commack High School. All except for Commack High School and Green Meadows Junior High were K-6. Commack High School, North Ridge, and Wood Park are all still used by the district. When Commack High School opened, the senior class was initially sent to nearby Hauppauge High School for the 1962–1963 school year. Commack only served students up to grade 11 at the time. Other schools open at this time include the Townline School and Smith's Lane School. Indian Hollow, Grace L. Hubbs, Rolling Hills, Sagtikos, John F. Kennedy Junior High School, and Commack High School South all opened around the same time in the mid to late 1960s. Commack High School became Commack High School North and the district became a dual high school district. By the end of the decade, Commack was the largest district in the county second only to Brentwood. Burr and Sawmill Junior High Schools both opened in 1972, giving the district a total of 21 schools. John Mandracchia was the first principal of Sawmill, and today it bears his name.

=== Decline in population ===
Commack's population would decline in the 1970s and 1980s, and the district had to start closing schools. First was the Marion E. Carll school. South Ridge, Smith's Lane, Green Meadows, Long Acres, Circle Hill, John F. Kennedy, Sagtikos, Green Fields, and Winnecomac were all closed between 1976 and 1983. Grace L. Hubbs also became the Administration Center of the district and closed for students. In this time, the district also reconfigured, taking on its current form of four K-2 schools (Wood Park, Indian Hollow, Rolling Hills, and North Ridge) two 3-5 schools (Sawmill and Burr), one 6-8 Middle School, and one 9-12 high school (Commack High School). Cedar Road and Old Farms both closed to make way for this plan. This meant the closing of a high school, and also the combination of the staunch rivals of Commack North and Commack South, which happened in 1989. Commack High School North became Commack High School and Commack High School South became Commack Middle School. The configuration of the district has not changed since.

=== Elwood merger attempts ===
In late 2010 and early 2011, the Elwood Union Free School District attempted merging with every school district surrounding it because of the district having very low funds. These districts were (along with Commack) Half Hollow Hills, Northport-East Northport, South Huntington, and Harborfields. All districts denied Elwood their merger request. Due to Elwood being a very small district bordering Commack, these concerns had been raised before, as Commack-Elwood mergers were attempted by Elwood in the 1960s and late 1980s. Both of these attempts were also denied by Commack.

== Schools ==
=== Primary schools ===
The primary schools in the Commack School District are Indian Hollow, Rolling Hills, North Ridge, and Wood Park. They serve students in grades K–2. The school day for these schools last from around 9:20 AM to 3:20 PM although one should check with the specific schools for exact times. The students have one teacher throughout the day except for special classes like music, art, and physical education and special services like speech, physical, or occupational therapy.

=== Intermediate schools ===
The intermediate schools are Burr and Sawmill. They serve students in grades 3–5. Their school day is from 8:50 AM to 3:05 PM. The two buildings are identical in their structure and design. Both schools have at least ten clubs that meet while school is not in session. The children have one teacher for the whole day except for special classes like music, art and physical education. There are many special services available like Physical Speech and Occupational Therapy, social workers, psychologists and a gifted and talented program. There is also an English as a second language program. In fourth grade, the students begin to learn a musical instrument. They are given lessons once a week and participate in the school's band or orchestra. There is a chorus for students who are interested in singing.

=== Middle school ===
The Commack Middle School serves students in grades 6–8. The school day lasts from 7:50 AM to 2:38 PM. Commack Middle School is the first school with multiple classes held in different rooms, unlike in the intermediate and primary schools. Each period is 41 minutes for the exception of 9th period (43 minutes). The students have 9 periods per day, each with a different teacher. Each child is required to take Math, English, Science, Social Studies, a foreign language, and Physical Education all year for the entire three years. They are also required to take Art, Family and Consumer Science, Technology and Health for a quarter of each year. There are 65 clubs and 20 sports teams for students.

=== High school ===
The Commack High School serves students in grades 9–12. The school day lasts from 7:30 AM to 2:25 PM. The students have nine periods per day, each with a different teacher. The classes are forty minutes in length with 5 minutes of walking time in between them. Each student is required to meet the requirements for a New York State Regents diploma unless there are special circumstances. They are also required to complete 15 CSIP (Community Service Involvement Program) credits their first three years and 20 their senior year. These can be fulfilled by participating in sports and clubs or by doing volunteer work inside or out of school. Commack High School is an International Baccalaureate School, and students pursuing an IB diploma are subject to a more stringent set of requirements. As of 2018, there were 15 honor societies, 52 clubs and 21 sports teams for students.

As of the 2019–2020 school year, the total enrollment was 2,187 students and 168 teachers. The student-to-teacher ratio was 13:1.

In 2012, U.S. News & World Report ranked Commack High School the best high school in Suffolk County, the third best on Long Island, the 18th best in New York state, and the 95th best in the country. As of 2018, Commack High School was unranked in New York State.

In 2024, Commack's Board of Education allowed for the reopening of the Cedar Road School as a school for students, after serving as strictly the Commack School District's special education administration offices for a few years. It completed its first school year as a school offering an alternative way to experience high school and earn a Commack High School Diploma without having to go to the school in the 2024–25 school year. It primarily serves students (grades 9–12) who are struggling with depression, anxiety, and avoiding school.

=== List of current and former schools ===
List of current and former schools within the Commack Union Free School District
School name	Current type	Geography	Former name	Former type	Year opened	Year closed	Building status	Disposition
Current schools
Commack High School	High school	North	Commack High School North	N/A	1962	N/A	Active	N/A
Commack Middle School	Middle school	South	Commack High School South	High school	1968	N/A	Active	N/A
Burr Intermediate School	Intermediate school	North	Burr Junior High School	Middle school	1972	N/A	Active	N/A
John Mandracchia Sawmill Intermediate School	Intermediate school	South	Saw Mill Junior High School/ John Mandracchia Sawmill Junior High.	Middle school	1972	N/A	Active	N/A
Indian Hollow Primary School	Primary school	North	Indian Hollow School	Elementary school	1964	N/A	Active	N/A
North Ridge Primary School	Primary school	North	North Ridge Elementary School	Elementary school	1962	N/A	Active	N/A
Rolling Hills Primary School	Primary school	South	Rolling Hills School	Elementary school	1965	N/A	Active	N/A
Wood Park Primary School	Primary school	South	Wood Park School	Elementary school	1961	N/A	Active	N/A
Hubbs Administration Center	Administrative building	North	Grace L. Hubbs School	Elementary school	1964	1976	Repurposed	Now Hubbs Administration Center
Cedar Road School	Alternative High school	North	Cedar Road School	Elementary school	2024	N/A	Active	N/A
Former schools
Greenmeadows Junior High School	Closed	South	N/A	Junior high school	1963	1979	Sold	Sold to Suffolk Jewish Community Center
John F. Kennedy Junior High School	Closed	North	N/A	Junior high school	1964	1981	Demolished	Land sold and demolished. Now Longmeadow Estates.
Cedar Road School	Closed	North	N/A	Elementary school	1960	1988	Leased	Leased to AHRC and Commack Special Services Corp. Later reopened in 2024.
Circle Hill School	Closed	North	N/A	Elementary school	1963	1981	Demolished	Land sold and demolished. Now housing developments.
Green Fields School	Closed	South	N/A	Elementary school	1961	1982	Sold	Sold to WM/YWHA
Grace L. Hubbs School	Administrative building	North	N/A	Elementary school	1964	1976	Repurposed	Now Hubbs Administration Center
Long Acres School	Closed	North	N/A	Elementary school	1963	1980	Leased	Leased to Kiddie Care Early Learning Center
Marion Carll School	Closed	South	N/A	Elementary school	1924	1974	Demolished	Sold to NY Tech; since demolished
Old Farms School	Closed	South	N/A	Elementary school	1963	1988	Leased	Leased to Suffolk Day Care Center
Sagtikos School	Closed	South	N/A	Elementary school	1965	1981	Leased	Now Building Blocks Preschool
Smith's Lane School	Closed	South	N/A	Elementary school	1958	1979	Leased	Leased to UCP
South Ridge School	Closed	South	N/A	Elementary school	1963	1976	Demolished	Burned, demolished and land sold to homes
Winnicomac School	Closed	North	N/A	Elementary school	1958	1983	Sold	Now Sappo Intermediate School and Tree of Life Preschool

== Board of Education ==
Commack Board of Education 2025–2026
Position	Name
President	Gus Hueber
Vice President	Dana Schultz
Trustee	William Hender
Trustee	Nicole Goldstein
Trustee	John Murray
Student Ex Officio	Cassidy Gill

== Academics ==
Commack Middle School was awarded first place in the Long Island Regional Middle School Science Bowl academic competition at Brookhaven National Laboratory on April 14, 2007, and went on to take seventh place in the academic competition in the National Middle School Science Bowl that same year. The Commack Middle School also won the Long Island Regional Middle School Science Bowl in March 2012, March 2014, and March 2016.

Commack High School was recognized as a National Blue Ribbon school of excellence in 2021.

The Suffolk County Reading Council has recognized the Commack School District's elementary schools for their achievements in the area of literacy.

== Athletics ==
=== Cougarettes Kickline ===
The Commack High School Cougarettes are one of the most accomplished kicklines in the country. They have won 28 titles across several divisions. This includes many titles in the 1990s (including in 1997, where they also won Long Island), winning both the medium and large varsity kick divisions in 2013, four straight NDA large varsity kick titles in 2022, 2023, 2024, and 2025, and winning titles three out of those four years in NDA medium varsity kick. After their 2024 win they were invited to the Suffolk County Legislature along with Commack High School Bowling. They also participate in events such as Jazz, Pom-Pom, Team Performance, and Hip-Hop.

=== Commack Baseball ===
The Commack High School baseball team won four straight Suffolk County titles from 2021 to 2024, including Long Island Championships in 2021, 2023, and 2024. They also won Suffolk County in 1965, 1997, and 2017. Commack High School South won Suffolk County in 1973 and 1977, and Long Island in 1977. Commack High School North won Suffolk County in 1984.

== Demographics ==
The tables below describe the school district's demographic data for the last three school years that have been made available by the New York State Education Department.

Enrollment by gender
Gender	Number of students (2018–2019)	Number of students (2019–2020)	Number of students (2020–2021)
Female	2,882 (48%)	2,857 (49%)	2,782 (49%)
Male	3,099 (52%)	3,018 (51%)	2,937 (51%)

Enrollment by ethnicity
Ethnicity	Number of students (2018–2019)	Number of students (2019–2020)	Number of students (2020–2021)
American Indian or Alaska Native	10 (0%)	13 (0%)	13 (0%)
Black or African American	72 (1%)	91 (2%)	105 (2%)
Hispanic or Latino	524 (9%)	582 (10%)	604 (11%)
Asian or Native Hawaiian/other Pacific Islander	532 (9%)	563 (10%)	592 (10%)
White	4,727 (79%)	4,508 (77%)	4,277 (75%)
Multiracial	116 (2%)	118 (2%)	128 (2%)

Other groups
Title	Number of students (2018–2019)	Number of students (2019–2020)	Number of students (2020–2021)
English language learners	65 (1%)	76 (1%)	81 (1%)
Students with disabilities	1,089 (18%)	1,029 (18%)	1,030 (18%)
Economically disadvantaged	781 (13%)	755 (13%)	750 (13%)
Migrant	-	-	-
Homeless	10 (0%)	11 (0%)	6 (0%)
Foster care	-	-	-
Parent in armed forces	-	-	-

== Notable alumni ==
- Carly Aquilino, standup comedian and TV personality (Girl Code)
- Dave Cohen, college football coach
- Bob Costas, sportscaster
- Don DeMola, MLB pitcher, Montreal Expos
- Courtney Galiano, dancer
- Adam Gertler, TV personality (FX Movie Download) and chef (Gertler's Wurst)
- Pete Harnisch, Major League Baseball player
- Jennifer Iacopelli, author
- Tom Mendoza, business executive, namesake of Mendoza College of Business at Notre Dame
- Tim Miller (Bizzle), professional Fortnite player for FaZe Clan
- Dianne Moritz, author
- Steve Morrison, co-host of Preston and Steve radio show
- Rosie O'Donnell, entertainer
- Samantha Prahalis, WNBA basketball player
- Ashley Reyes, actress and star of Walker
- Ruth Ann Swenson, opera singer
