= Long Island Football Championships =

High school football championship in New York state

Following is a list of high school teams that have competed in the Long Island Football Championship games on Long Island, New York.

The faux or mini championship pits the winner of the divisions/league champions in Nassau County, New York against the winner of the divisions/league in Suffolk County, New York.

New York State has a true state championship but the Long Island teams, and teams from the Catholic High School Athletic Association (also known as the Catholic High School Football League), as well as those in New York City PSAL choose not to compete in the tournament. The Catholic league teams compete for their own Catholic state title while the NYC teams play for a city championship.

Football is one of only sports that Long Island chooses not to be a part of the state championship. Many believe it’s due to revenue generated from Long Island championship games (in football), and the fact that LI teams would have to slightly adjust their in season schedule. They would also have to comply to the class / size system that the rest of state and country uses as opposed to the division system used on the Island.

Year	Class	County	Winner	Loser	W Score	L Score	Notes
1992	1	Suffolk	Connetquot	Farmingdale	27	0	
1992	2	Suffolk	Bellport	Garden City	8	6	
1992	3	Nassau	Lynbrook	Islip	19	7	
1992	4	Nassau	Island Trees	Mt Sinai	8	0	
1993	1	Nassau	Massapequa	Longwood	12	7	
1993	2	Nassau	Garden City	West Islip	14	9	
1993	3	Nassau	New Hyde Park	Deer Park	34	14	
1993	4	Nassau	Bethpage	Southampton	41	6	
1994	1	Nassau	Massapequa	Connetquot	23	21	
1994	2	Suffolk	West Islip	Garden City	7	0	2OT
1994	3	Nassau	Bethpage	Comsewogue	20	15	
1994	4	Suffolk	Harborfields	Manhasset	6	0	
1995	1	Nassau	Lawrence	Sachem	14	7	
1995	2	Suffolk	Bellport	Garden City	26	19	
1995	3	Suffolk	North Babylon	Bethpage	28	13	
1995	4	Nassau	Carle Place	Harborfields	33	7	
1996	1	Suffolk	Patchogue-Medford	Uniondale	21	6	
1996	2	Nassau	Division	Bellport	31	28	
1996	3	Suffolk	Comsewogue	Bethpage	15	13	
1996	4	Suffolk	Harborfields	Manhasset	21	13	
1997	1	Suffolk	Patchogue-Medford	Freeport	27	12	
1997	2	Suffolk	Bellport	Lawrence	44	12	
1997	3	Suffolk	North Babylon	Clarke	50	0	
1997	4	Suffolk	Babylon	Roosevelt	18	12	OT
1998	1	Suffolk	Longwood	Massapequa	22	19	
1998	2	Suffolk	North Babylon	Garden City	34	0	
1998	3	Suffolk	Sayville	Glen Cove	51	6	
1998	4	Nassau	Seaford	Babylon	23	12	
1999	1	Suffolk	Brentwood	Farmingdale	13	6	
1999	2	Suffolk	North Babylon	Hewlett	38	19	
1999	3	Suffolk	Amityville	Garden City	18	16	
1999	4	Nassau	Roosevelt	Harborfields	25	0	
2000	1	Nassau	Freeport	Commack	20	19	OT
2000	2	Nassau	Garden City	North Babylon	20	14	
2000	3	Nassau	Bethpage	Amityville	29	28	
2000	4	Nassau	Roosevelt	Babylon	28	12	
2001	1	Nassau	Farmingdale	William Floyd	12	3	
2001	2	Suffolk	Bellport	South Side	42	19	
2001	3	Nassau	Wantagh	Harborfields	17	7	
2001	4	Nassau	Cold Spring Harbor	Babylon	7	6	
2002	1	Suffolk	Patchogue-Medford	Farmingdale	27	13	
2002	2	Suffolk	North Babylon	MacArthur	36	15	
2002	3	Nassau	Bethpage	Islip	28	14	
2002	4	Suffolk	Babylon	Seaford	30	0	
2003	1	Nassau	Freeport	William Floyd	40	7	
2003	2	Nassau	Garden City	Riverhead	20	0	
2003	3	Nassau	Bethpage	Huntington	18	7	
2003	4	Suffolk	Babylon	Roosevelt	22	15	
2004	1	Suffolk	Longwood	Farmingdale	39	23	
2004	2	Suffolk	North Babylon	Garden City	43	14	
2004	3	Suffolk	Sayville	Wantagh	55	14	
2004	4	Nassau	Roosevelt	Amityville	7	0	
2005	1	Suffolk	William Floyd	Baldwin	34	27	
2005	2	Suffolk	Bellport	Garden City	8	0	
2005	3	Suffolk	Huntington	Plainedge	27	13	
2005	4	Nassau	Cold Spring Harbor	Babylon	41	0	
2006	1	Suffolk	William Floyd	East Meadow	42	20	
2006	2	Nassau	Lawrence	Bellport	28	27	
2006	3	Suffolk	Sayville	Bethpage	48	6	
2006	4	Nassau	Roosevelt	Mt Sinai	21	14	
2007	1	Suffolk	William Floyd	Farmingdale	42	0	
2007	2	Suffolk	East Islip	Lawrence	35	7	
2007	3	Suffolk	Islip	Bethpage	14	12	
2007	4	Suffolk	Amityville	Seaford	28	0	
2008	1	Suffolk	Connetquot	Freeport	21	13	
2008	2	Suffolk	Riverhead	Elmont	42	6	
2008	3	Suffolk	Sayville	Bethpage	13	6	
2008	4	Suffolk	Babylon	Seaford	35	28	
2009	1	Nassau	Freeport	William Floyd	38	14	
2009	2	Nassau	Garden City	North Babylon	9	6	
2009	3	Suffolk	Half Hollow Hills West	Lawrence	42	32	
2009	4	Nassau	Seaford	Amityville	34	20	
2010	1	Nassau	Freeport	William Floyd	62	35	
2010	2	Suffolk	Bellport	Garden City	26	21	
2010	3	Nassau	Lynbrook	Sayville	42	27	
2010	4	Suffolk	Glenn	Seaford	28	7	
2011	1	Suffolk	William Floyd	East Meadow	54	47	
2011	2	Suffolk	Newfield	Garden City	14	7	
2011	3	Suffolk	Sayville	Lawrence	78	61	
2011	4	Suffolk	Glenn	Roosevelt	56	21	
2012	1	Suffolk	William Floyd	Farmingdale	31	14	
2012	2	Nassau	Garden City	Riverhead	29	16	
2012	3	Nassau	Lawrence	Sayville	21	20	
2012	4	Suffolk	Babylon	Roosevelt	48	18	
2013	1	Suffolk	Sachem North	Farmingdale	27	21	
2013	2	Nassau	Carey	Riverhead	20	6	
2013	3	Nassau	Lawrence	Huntington	41	32	
2013	4	Suffolk	Babylon	Roosevelt	27	26	
2014	1	Nassau	Syosset	Lindenhurst	35	13	
2014	2	Nassau	Carey	East Islip	41	7	
2014	3	Nassau	Lawrence	Sayville	40	35	
2014	4	Suffolk	Shoreham-Wading River	Roosevelt	47	13	
2015	1	Suffolk	Longwood	Farmingdale	47	28	
2015	2	Suffolk	Newfield	MacArthur	41	33	
2015	3	Suffolk	Sayville	Plainedge	59	15	
2015	4	Suffolk	Shoreham-Wading River	Locust Valley	35	7	
2016	1	Nassau	Freeport	William Floyd	28	14	
2016	2	Nassau	Garden City	Half Hollow Hills West	13	6	
2016	3	Nassau	Wantagh	East Islip	21	14	
2016	4	Suffolk	Shoreham-Wading River	Seaford	20	10	
2017	1	Suffolk	Lindenhurst	Oceanside	40	23	
2017	2	Nassau	Garden City	North Babylon	24	6	
2017	3	Suffolk	Westhampton	Lawrence	54	26	
2017	4	Nassau	Seaford	Miller Place	29	27	
2018	1	Nassau	Freeport	William Floyd	20	19	
2018	2	Nassau	Garden City	Lindenhurst	19	0	
2018	3	Suffolk	Half Hollow Hills West	Plainedge	34	6	
2018	4	Nassau	Cold Spring Harbor	Shoreham-Wading River	42	20	
2019	1	Nassau	Freeport	William Floyd	42	14	
2019	2	Suffolk	Lindenhurst	Garden City	14	13	
2019	3	Nassau	Plainedge	Sayville	56	20	
2019	4	Suffolk	Shoreham-Wading River	Seaford	49	7	
2021	1	Nassau	Massapequa	Walt Whitman	38	35	
2021	2	Nassau	Garden City	Bellport	14	6	
2021	3	Nassau	Plainedge	East Islip	26	16	
2021	4	Nassau	North Shore	Shoreham-Wading River	7	0	
2022	1	Nassau	Farmingdale	Ward Melville	42	20	
2022	2	Nassau	Garden City	Bellport	28	0	
2022	3	Suffolk	Sayville	Plainedge	33	7	
2022	4	Suffolk	Bayport-Blue Point	North Shore	35	7	
2023	1	Nassau	Massapequa	William Floyd	35	7	
2023	2	Nassau	Garden City	North Babylon	38	7	
2023	3	Suffolk	East Islip	South Side	19	14	
2023	4	Suffolk	Bayport-Blue Point	Seaford	42	20	
2024	1	Nassau	Massapequa	William Floyd	42	40	
2024	2	Nassau	Carey	Half Hollow Hills East	37	36	
2024	3	Nassau	Garden City	Sayville	31	28	
2024	4	Nassau	Wantagh	Bayport-Blue Point	29	21	
2025	1	Nassau	Massapequa	Ward Melville	14	12	
2025	2	Nassau	Garden City	East Islip	10	7	
2025	3	Suffolk	Sayville	Wantagh	42	35	
2025	4	Suffolk	Bayport-Blue Point	Seaford	20	19	
