= Christine Griffin =

American lawyer (born 1955)

Christine M. Griffin
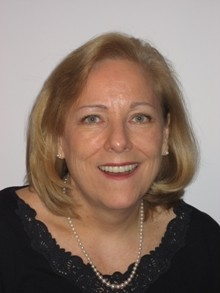

Assistant Secretary for Disability Policies and Programs, Massachusetts Executive Office of Health and Human Services
- In office August 29, 2011 – 2013
- Governor: Deval Patrick
- Secretary: JudyAnn Bigby; John Polanowicz

Deputy Director of the United States Office of Personnel Management
- In office January 4, 2010 – August 2011
- President: Barack Obama
- Director: Morrell J. Berry
- Preceded by: Howard Weizmann
- Succeeded by: Earl L. Gay

Vice Chair of the Equal Employment Opportunity Commission acting
- In office January 2009 – January 2, 2010
- President: Barack Obama
- Preceded by: Leslie E. Silverman
- Succeeded by: Jenny R. Yang

Commissioner of the Equal Employment Opportunity Commission
- In office January 2005 – January 2, 2010
- President: George W. Bush; Barack Obama
- Preceded by: Paul S. Miller
- Succeeded by: Jacqueline A. Berrien

Personal details
- Born: February 10, 1955 (age 71) Boston, Massachusetts, U.S.
- Party: Democratic
- Spouse: Philip D. Berry
- Education: Massachusetts Maritime Academy (BS); Boston College (JD)
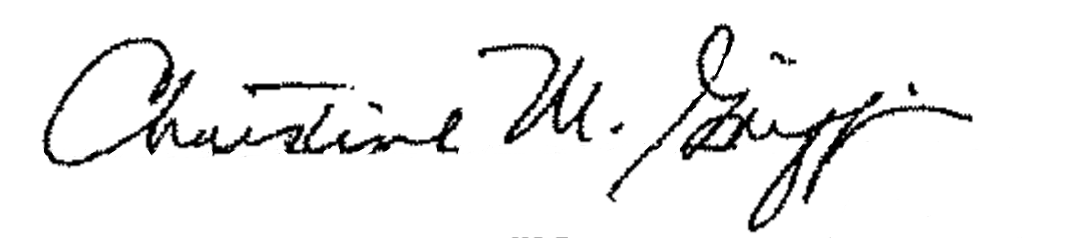
- Signature

Military service
- Allegiance: United States
- Branch/service: United States Army
- Years of service: 1974–1977 (active); 1977–1979 (reserves)

Christine M. Griffin (born February 10, 1955) is an American lawyer. From 2011 to 2013 she served as Assistant Secretary for Disability Policies and Programs for the Massachusetts Executive Office of Health and Human Services.

After military service on active duty from 1974 to 1977, Griffin graduated from the Massachusetts Maritime Academy in 1983 and worked for the U.S. Food and Drug Administration. She received a Juris Doctor from the Boston College Law School in 1993 and held posts in disability advocacy groups and as commissioner of the Equal Employment Opportunity Commission until 2009. From 2010 to 2011 she served as deputy director of the United States Office of Personnel Management under John Berry.

== Early life and career ==
Griffin was born in Dorchester, Boston, Massachusetts. She went to St. Patrick's High School in Roxbury, Boston and served on active duty in the United States Army from 1974 to 1977. Griffin later entered the Massachusetts Maritime Academy to become a marine engineer. A car accident in her third year left her partially paralyzed and using a wheelchair. She graduated in 1983 with a Bachelor of Science in marine engineering. In the summers of 1991 and 1992 she was a legal intern for the U.S. Attorney's office in Boston and for McDermott, O'Neil & Associates. She has served on the boards of many business and educational organizations including the Massachusetts Board of Higher Education, the Massachusetts Maritime Academy Board of Trustees. From 1999 to 2001 she served as the disability liaison for the Massachusetts Democratic Party.

After her graduation, Griffin tested medical devices in a laboratory of the U.S. Food and Drug Administration (FDA) in Winchester, Massachusetts. She later became a field investigator and faced difficulty due to her disability. A FDA prosecution of a medical device manufacturer got Griffin interested in law and she entered Boston College Law School in 1990 to become a legal adviser for the FDA or a medical equipment company. As a student, Griffin was hired as an intern to study the Americans with Disabilities Act of 1990 for a Boston lobbyist and came in contact with disability rights movement advocates. She graduated in 1993 with a Juris Doctor. Upon graduation, she was awarded a Skadden Arps Fellowship at the Boston Disability Law Center and worked as Interim President of the Massachusetts Maritime Academy from 1993 to 1994.

=== Disability advocacy ===
From 1995 to 1996, Griffin served as an attorney advisor to the Vice Chair of the Equal Employment Opportunity Commission, Paul Igasaki, and served as executive director of the Boston Disability Law Center from 1996 to 2005. Griffin is a labor law expert and was named "Lawyer of the Year" by Lawyers Weekly in 2005.

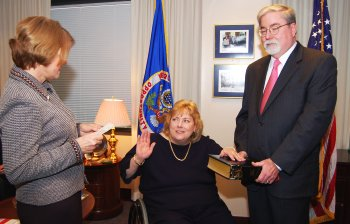
Griffin is sworn in as commissioner by Cari M. Dominguez while her husband looks on.

Griffin, a Democrat, in January 2005 agreed to fill a vacancy on the Equal Employment Opportunity Commission. After being nominated by President George W. Bush and confirmed by the United States Senate she took office on January 3, 2006, to serve the remainder of a five-year term expiring July 1, 2009. As commissioner, Griffin advocated for increasing the number of disabled workers in the federal government. In January 2009, President Barack Obama appointed Griffin as acting vice chairman of the commission; she served until December 2009.

== Office of Personnel Management ==
President Barack Obama nominated Griffin as deputy director of the United States Office of Personnel Management on May 12, 2009; after confirmation by the United States Senate she took office on January 4, 2010.

== Return to Massachusetts ==
Griffin became Massachusetts Assistant Secretary for Disability Policies and Programs on August 29, 2011. From 2013 to 2018 she was the executive director of the Disability Law Center. In 2018 she became a search specialist consultant with Bender Consulting Services, Inc.
