= South Huntington Union Free School District =

Public school district in New York, United States

Location
- Huntington Station, Suffolk County, New York; United States

District information
- Motto: Creating the Leaders of Tomorrow
- Grades: K-12
- Established: 1924
- President: Nicholas Ciapetta, J.D.
- Superintendent: Dr. Vito D'Elia
- Schools: 7

Students and staff
- Students: 5,714
- District mascot: Wildcats
- Colors: Maroon and white

Other information
- District Offices: 60 Weston Street Huntington Station, NY 11746
- Website: www.shufsd.org

South Huntington Union Free School District is a school district in the Town of Huntington in Suffolk County, New York. The district serves parts of the hamlets of Greenlawn, West Hills, South Huntington, Melville, Elwood, Dix Hills, and Huntington Station.

== History ==
=== Earliest schools in area ===
The first school in the area was the Long Swamp School, opening in 1892. The South Huntington Public Library on Pidgeon Hill Road in Huntington Station. This school was a part of the Common School District #12 (South Huntington), along with the Depot Road School built in 1910. Depot Road was in the area between Depot Road, Melville Road, and Jericho Turnpike. Built two years later in 1912 by Common School District #13 (West Hills), the West Hills School opened on West Jericho Turnpike. The first school in District #13 burnt down in the 1800s.

=== Formation of the modern district ===
The South Huntington Union Free School District of today was founded in 1924 with the combination of South Huntington Common District #12 and West Hills Common District #13, taking the name of South Huntington and number of West Hills. The community was growing rapidly, and did not have enough space for students with the format in place at the time. Neither district was allowed to construct a new school, which was needed to conform to the district's growth. The new district opened its first school in 1928, known then as the Central School, it is still open today as the Whitman Atrium in Huntington Station. Similarly to several other districts in the area like Harborfields and Cold Spring Harbor, high school students went to Huntington High School until the new district's high school graduated its first class. In the case of South Huntington, Central School (also known as South Huntington High School, and later South Huntington Junior-Senior High School) graduated its first high school class of just 15 students in 1931.

=== History of the district since forming ===
Two out of three original schools in the South Huntington and West Hills districts that combined to make today's district were used as annexes until 1957 in the new district. Earlier attempts to close the two schools in 1929 were soundly stopped by a vote of 150 to 4 at a unique meeting discussing the topic. Following the beginning of the district, many different rooms were used by the district for schooling but they did not use any new buildings until 1952. The district purchased 15 acres of land in 1944, which would house the Silas Wood Elementary School, the oldest school still used by the modern district. Silas Wood opened in 1952 after construction was approved in 1949. In 1954, a tremendous campaign was put together to drum up support for a new high school and three elementary buildings. The vote passed, and all four schools; Walt Whitman High School, Oakwood School, Maplewood School, and Birchwood School, are all in the district still today. Walt Whitman High School opened in the 1956–1957 school year, and served grades 8–12 at the time. The Central School, no longer a high school, was used for 6th and 7th graders that year. Birchwood School picked up 7th grade the following year. The same year, 1957–1958, Beverly Hill Elementary and Pidgeon Hill Elementary opened, with West Hill Elementary opening the following year. Also in 1958, Memorial Junior High opened. In 1960, the long-standing Central School, known at that point as Central Elementary School, was renovated and added to greatly. Stimson Junior High School and Countrywood Elementary School both opened in 1965 and 1964 respectively. Both schools are still used by the district today. All of this growth since the beginning of the district was a cause in a boom in population in both the community and the district, and caused the extreme growth in schools and even shopping malls and movie theatres in the area. The district's population peaked in 1968, before a drop in population occurred. Pidgeon Hill and Central Elementary both became annexes in the early 1970s due to this. In 1975, West Hill Elementary closed. In 1979, Beverly Hill Elementary closed too. The drop in population had become so steep and significant, that in the early 1980s the district had to sell Beverly Hill and Central, the latter being the district in its modern form's very first school. Memorial Junior High School closed as well in 1984 and was leased by the district. In 1988, the Alternative High School opened. Due to major cuts in the early 1990s, the district had to restructure itself. This caused the modern format to be introduced, first in 1992–1993, with the exception of there being no Silas Wood Sixth Grade Center (all 6th graders went to Stimson Middle School at the time). Silas Wood Early Childhood Center would also close due to the cuts. Silas Wood would return in 1996 as the Sixth Grade Center, and the district's grade format has and will not change until the 2026-2027 school year. That year Silas Wood will become a pre-kindergarten school and what was once Memorial Junior High will return as the new Sixth Grade Center, replacing Silas Wood.

== Schools ==
The following is a table of the schools in the South Huntington Union Free School District.

School name	Type of school	Address	Grades	Principal
Walt Whitman High School	High School	301 West Hills Road Huntington Station, NY 11746	9-12	Dr. John Murphy
Stimson Middle School	Middle School	401 Oakwood Road Huntington Station, NY 11746	7-8	Michael Duggan
Birchwood Intermediate School	Intermediate School	121 Wolf Hill Road Melville, NY 11747	3-5	Dimitri Bernadel
Maplewood Intermediate School	Intermediate School	19 School Lane Huntington Station, NY 11746	3-5	Maria Colon
Countrywood Primary Center	Elementary School	499 Old Country Road Huntington Station, NY 11746	K-2	Mitch Levy
Oakwood Primary Center	Elementary School	264 West 22nd Street Huntington, NY 11743	K-2	Annie Michaelian
Silas Wood Pre-K Center	Early Education	23 Harding Place Huntington Station, NY 11746	Pre-K	Renee Schumm
