= Ifeanyi Momah =

American football player (born 1989)

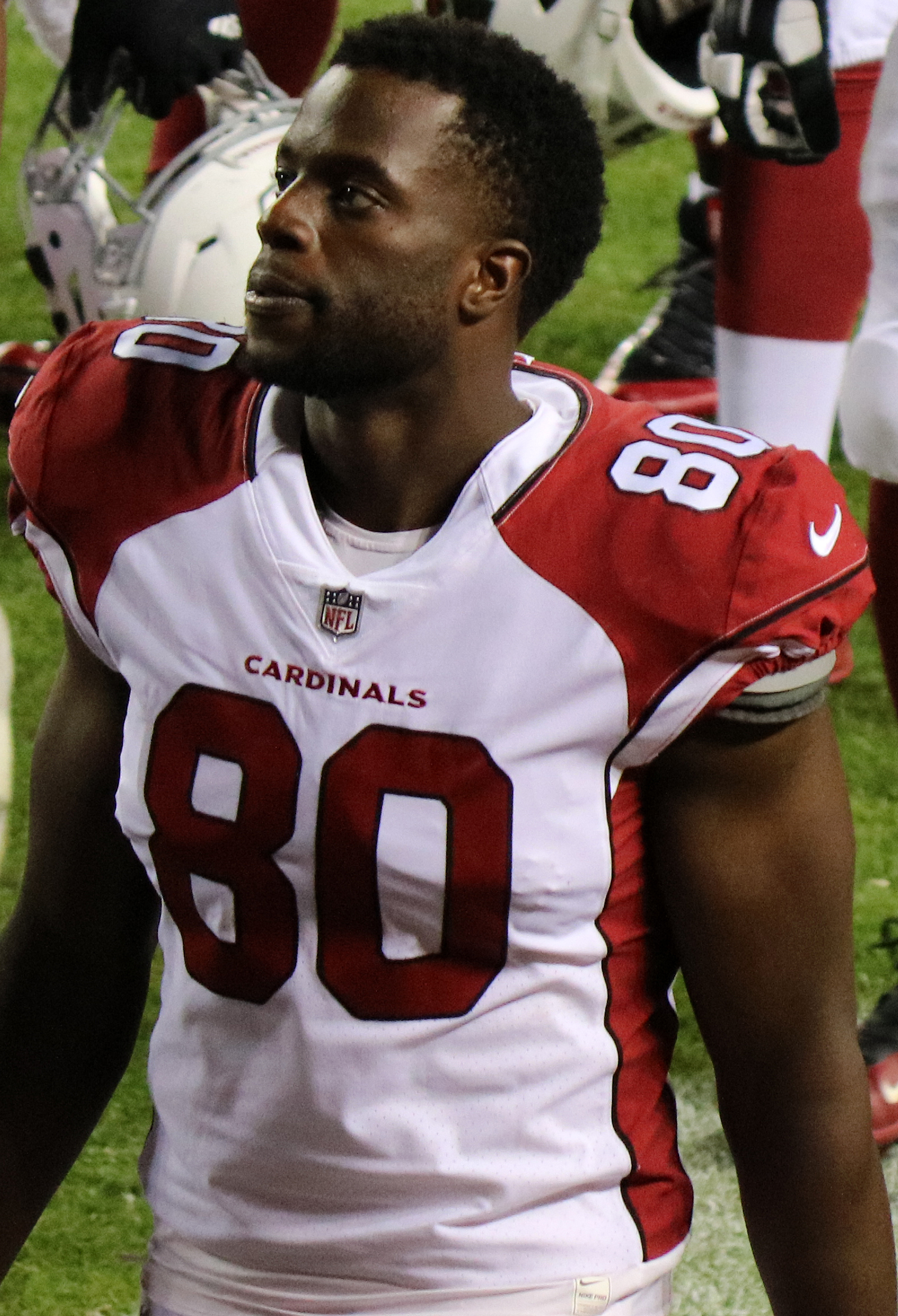
- Momah with the Cardinals in 2017

No. 80
- Position: Tight end

Personal information
- Born: October 23, 1989 (age 37); Greenlawn, New York, U.S.
- Listed height: 6 ft 7 in (2.01 m)
- Listed weight: 255 lb (116 kg)

Career information
- High school: Elwood-John H. Glenn (Elwood, New York)
- College: Boston College
- NFL draft: 2012: undrafted

Career history
- Philadelphia Eagles (2013−2014)*; Cleveland Browns (2014)*; Detroit Lions (2014)*; Arizona Cardinals (2015−2017)
- * Offseason or practice squad member only

Career NFL statistics
- Receptions: 3
- Receiving yards: 96
- Total tackles: 7
- Forced fumbles: 1
- Fumble recoveries: 1
- Stats at Pro Football Reference

Ifeanyi Joenathan Momah [pronounced e-FAH-nee MOE-ma] (born October 23, 1989) is an American former professional football player who was a tight end in the National Football League (NFL). He played college football for the Boston College Eagles.

== College career ==
Momah saw limited action as a true freshman. As a sophomore, he caught 11 passes for 149 yards and three touchdowns. He redshirted his junior season. As a redshirt junior, he caught a career-high 19 passes for 296 yards and three touchdowns. His senior season, he tore his ACL during the first game of the season where he logged a team high eight receptions for 157 yards. He missed the rest of the season. When he tried to appeal for a 6th year, the NCAA denied access, causing him to enter the NFL draft.

== Professional career ==
=== Philadelphia Eagles ===
Momah was signed by the Eagles on March 30, 2013 as an undrafted free agent. On August 30, 2013, Momah was waived by the Eagles during final cuts. He was re-signed to a future contract by the Philadelphia Eagles on January 7, 2014.

=== Cleveland Browns ===
Momah signed with the Cleveland Browns practice squad on September 9, 2014. He was released on September 16, 2014 to make room for LB Allen Bradford.

=== Detroit Lions ===
Momah signed with the Detroit Lions practice squad on October 20, 2014. He was released on November 3, 2014. Momah was re-signed to a reserve/future contract at the conclusion of the season, but was waived with a "failure to disclose physical condition" designation on February 3, 2015.

=== Arizona Cardinals ===
After a strong showing at the 2015 NFL Veteran combine, he signed with the Arizona Cardinals in March 2015. Momah, who had previously played as a wide receiver, switched to tight end when joining the Cardinals. On September 10, 2015, Momah was placed on injured reserve after injuring his knee during practice.

On September 3, 2016, Momah was released by the Cardinals and was signed to the Cardinals' practice squad the next day. He was promoted to the active roster on September 27, 2016. On October 24, 2016, Momah caught his first two passes for 50 yards, including one that went for 27 yards in overtime, in a 6-6 tie against the Seattle Seahawks. He was placed on injured reserve on November 2, 2016 after suffering a broken wrist in Week 8.

On September 17, 2017, in Week 2, Momah had a 46-yard reception in the 16–13 overtime victory over the Indianapolis Colts. In Week 10, Momah suffered a broken leg and was placed on injured reserve on November 10, 2017.

== Personal life ==
His parents, Nathan and Gloria, immigrated to the United States from Nigeria as a couple when they were teenagers so they could attend college. Ifeanyi’s older brother, Onyi, played fullback at Hofstra University and participated in training camps with the Buffalo Bills and the Cincinnati Bengals.
