= Paul Steven Miller =

American academic (1961–2010)

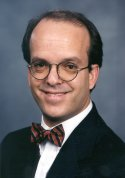
- Born: May 4, 1961; Flushing, New York
- Died: October 19, 2010 (aged 49); Mercer Island, Washington
- Education: University of Pennsylvania; Harvard Law School
- Occupations: Law professor Special Assistant to the U.S. President (2009)
- Employer: University of Washington School of Law (on leave 2009)
- Spouse: Jennifer Coletti Mechem
- Children: 2

Paul Steven Miller (May 4, 1961 – October 19, 2010) was the Henry M. Jackson Professor of Law at the University of Washington School of Law. He was a Commissioner of the Equal Employment Opportunity Commission (EEOC) for almost 10 years, and in 2009 he was chosen to serve as a special assistant to President Barack Obama. Miller, who had the genetic condition achondroplasia (a type of dwarfism) was 4 feet 5 inches (135 cm) tall. He was known as a leader in the disability rights movement, and an expert on anti-discrimination law and international disability rights.

== Biography ==
Miller was born in Flushing, New York and attended John Glenn High School in Elwood, New York. Miller attended the University of Pennsylvania, where he was active in the comedy troupe Mask and Wig, received his B.A. cum laude in 1983, and subsequently served as a university trustee. He went to Harvard Law School and received his J.D. in 1986.

When Miller graduated from Harvard Law, the Americans with Disabilities Act of 1990 had not yet been adopted and Section 504 of the Rehabilitation Act did not do enough; despite his academic credentials of graduating near the top of his class, Miller encountered considerable resistance in his efforts to find a job. Initially he had over 40 firms seeking his application, but later said that he received 45 rejection letters without a single callback. He repeatedly found that law firms would show interest in him, based on his resume, and then lose interest when they discovered his height. He said that one firm told him they were afraid clients would consider his employment a "circus freak show". A hiring committee told him, "We're not going to hire you because we think our clients would think we are running a freak circus if they saw you." Miller eventually became a litigation associate at the Los Angeles law firm then known as Manatt, Phelps, Phillips & Kantor. (Miller's stint at Manatt Phelps has been identified as an inspiration for the character "Hamilton Schuyler", a dwarf lawyer portrayed by actor David Rappaport in the television series L.A. Law.)

In 1990 Miller became director of litigation for the Western Law Center for Disability Rights at Loyola Law School in Los Angeles. After the election of Bill Clinton as president in 1992, Miller worked for the transition team as a disability outreach and search manager. He subsequently held posts as deputy director of the U.S. Office of Consumer Affairs and White House liaison to the disability community.

In 1994 President Clinton appointed Miller to be a Commissioner of the EEOC, Miller served a total of ten years, one of the longest tenures of any commissioner in EEOC history. At the EEOC, he worked to develop an alternative dispute resolution program to resolve discrimination claims before litigation. In August 2004 Miller resigned to become a professor at the University of Washington (UW) Law School; his seat on the EEOC remained empty until January 2006, when it was finally filled by another noted disability activist, Christine M. Griffin. UW made Miller the Henry M. Jackson Professor of Law in January 2008. At the installation ceremony for this position, Miller's law school colleague Anna Mastroianni commented, "Paul Miller may have been born a dwarf, but in reality he is a giant. We are all better for seeing a little further from the perch of his shoulders."

In his later career, Miller wrote about the interplay of disability rights and genetic science, writing papers with titles such as "Is There a Pink Slip in My Genes?" and "Avoiding Genetic Genocide". Among other issues, Miller discussed the potential for people to lose their jobs because of the disclosure of their future health risks. Dr. Francis S. Collins, director of the National Institutes of Health and leader of the Human Genome Project, noted that Miller's "persistence paid off: after more than a decade of frustration, the Genetic Information Nondiscrimination Act was finally signed into law in 2008. Paul was one of its biggest heroes."

In 2007 Miller was recruited to join then Senator Obama's Disability Policy Committee by his long-time friend and protege, Rebecca Cokley. In February 2009, Miller was appointed as a special assistant to President Barack Obama, with responsibility for managing political appointments at the U.S. Department of Justice and other positions in the new administration, as well as for positions relating to disability programs.

Miller developed tumors in his arm during the last decade of his life. An amputation did not prevent the cancer's recurrence, and he died on October 19, 2010.

== Honors ==
Early in his career Miller had become a leader of the Little People of America. In 2002 this organization presented Miller with its annual Award for Promoting Awareness of Individuals with Dwarfism.

Miller was a Phi Beta Kappa Visiting Scholar, Parsons Visiting Scholar at the University of Sydney Faculty of Law, and a Fellow of the British-American Project. In 2003 Miller was awarded an honorary Doctor of Laws degree by City University of New York School of Law.

== Personal life ==
Miller married Jennifer Coletti Mechem, a disability policy coordinator, in 1997. They had two children who were 10 and 5 when their father died.
