= Rebecca Cokley =

American disability rights activist

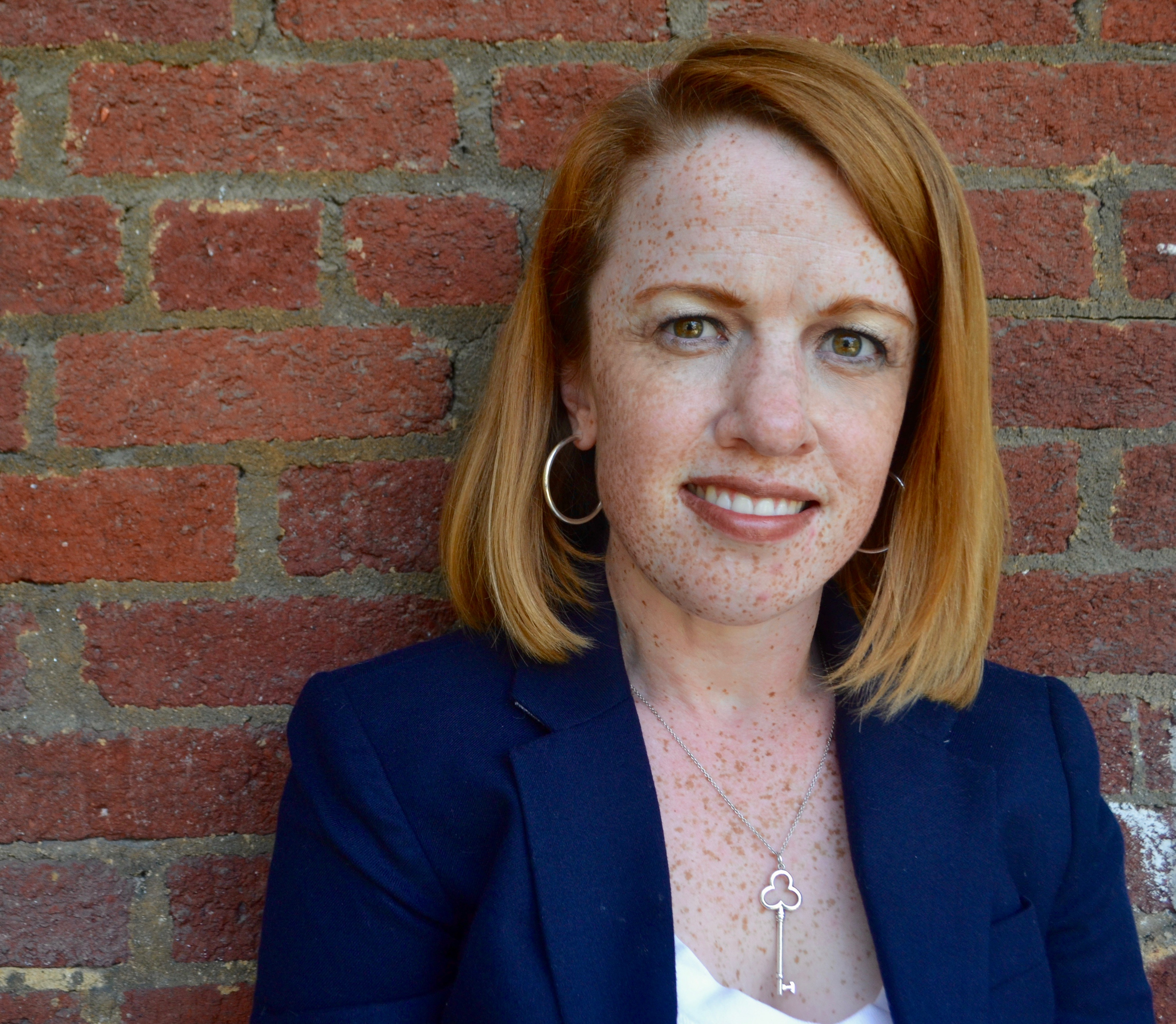
- Cokley in 2017
- Born: Rebecca Hare; December 4, 1978 (age 47); California, U.S.
- Education: University of California, Santa Cruz (BA)
- Spouse: Patrick Cokley (m. 2008)
- Children: 2
- Relatives: James Hare (grandfather)

Rebecca A. Hare Cokley (born December 4, 1978) is an American disability rights activist and public speaker who is currently the first U.S. Disability Rights Program Officer for the Ford Foundation. Prior to joining Ford, Cokley was the founding director of the Disability Justice Initiative at the Center for American Progress. During the Obama administration, Cokley served as the executive director of the National Council on Disability.

== Early life and advocacy ==
Born Rebecca A. Hare on December 4, 1978, in California, Cokley grew up in the San Francisco Bay Area. She was born with achondroplasia, a common cause of dwarfism. Both of Cokley's parents were born with the same kind of dwarfism and met at a Little People of America convention in the 1970s. She is the granddaughter of Judge James A. Hare Jr, and Katherine Terrell Hare.

She earned a bachelor's degree in political science at the University of California, Santa Cruz (UCSC) in 2001. Cokley began her career at the Institute for Educational Leadership where she worked for five years building tools and resources to empower and educate youth with disabilities and their adult allies. Cokley participated in the Education Policy Fellowship Program in 2006.

== Obama administration ==
From 2009 to 2013, Cokley served as an appointee in the administration of President Barack Obama. She was recruited to join the Obama administration by her friend and mentor, Paul Steven Miller, a former Equal Employment Opportunity Commission (EEOC) commissioner.

Cokley first worked in the Department of Education as Confidential Assistant to the Assistant Secretary in the Office of Special Education and Rehabilitative Services. She then served as Director of Priority Placement for Public Engagement in the Presidential Personnel Office at the White House where she was responsible for outreach to diversity and minority organizations to recruit professionals to the administration. Her final appointment in the Obama administration was as Special Assistant to the Principal Deputy at the Administration for Community Living at the U.S. Department of Health and Human Services.

On April 16, 2013, she became the executive director of the National Council on Disability by appointment of NCD Chairperson Jeff Rosen. Under her tenure, NCD focused on major civil rights issues including police violence, mental health services for students in post-secondary education, and disproportionate discipline as well as over- and under-identification of students of color with disabilities in education.

== Center for American Progress ==
In July 2018, Cokley joined the Center for American Progress (CAP), a liberal think tank, first director of the organization's Disability Justice Initiative. Senator Tammy Duckworth, who is also disabled, was a featured speaker at the inaugural event. While at CAP, Cokley criticized Eugene Scalia, Donald Trump's nominee to serve as Secretary of Labor, for his record on worker safety and disability rights. During the 2020 Democratic presidential primary, Cokley consulted Elizabeth Warren's campaign on disability policy.

== Awards and recognition ==
In 2015, to celebrate the 25th anniversary of the Americans with Disabilities Act, the National Disability Mentoring Coalition inducted Cokley into the inaugural Susan M. Daniels Disability Mentoring Hall of Fame. She was also a recipient of the Frank Harkin Memorial Award by the National Council on Independent Living. Cokley was named the 2020 Richman Distinguished Fellow in Public Life by Brandeis University. In 2021, she was invited by the University of Arizona to host a webinar on disability rights.

Cokley has consulted or given expert testimony to the National Council on Independent Living, the Equal Employment Opportunity Commission, the World Bank, the Social Security Administration's Ticket to Work Advisory panel, the President's Task Force on Employment of Adults with Disability, and the committee for the U.S. Department of Labor's Workforce Investment Act Reauthorization.

Her publications include "Youth Development and Youth Leadership: A Background Paper" from the National Collaborative on Workforce and Disability for Youth, articles on civic engagement for the newsletter Impact, "the 411 on Disability Disclosure," "Paving the Way to Work: A Guide to Career-Focused Mentoring," and various policy agendas for the National Youth Leadership Network.
