= Rocky Point High School =

Coordinates: 40°56′26″N 72°56′29″W

Location
- 82 Rocky Pt-Yaphank Rd; Rocky Point, New York; United States

Information
- Type: Public high school
- Established: 1971
- Principal: James Moeller
- Teaching staff: 74.50 (on FTE basis)
- Grades: 9-12
- Enrollment: 905 (2023-2024)
- Student to teacher ratio: 12.15
- Colors: Blue and white
- Mascot: Eagle
- Newspaper: Eagle's Eye
- Yearbook: Aerie
- Website: http://rockypointufsd.org/

Rocky Point High School is a public school of the Rocky Point Union Free School District along the north shore of Long Island, located in Rocky Point, New York. It is the only high school in the district and serves grades 9-12.

Prior to its formation in 1971, students from the Rocky Point area attending public school attended school in Port Jefferson, New York. It was Rocky Point Junior Senior High School, (7th-12th grade) until the opening of the Rocky Point Middle School in September 2002. The first graduating class in Rocky Point was 1975, because from 1971 to 1974 it was not yet considered a high school.

== Notable alumni ==
- Danny Burawa, major league baseball player
- Jeff Rosenstock, musician
- John Wilson (filmmaker) (born 1986), documentary filmmaker
