= Peter Catalanotto =

American book illustrator

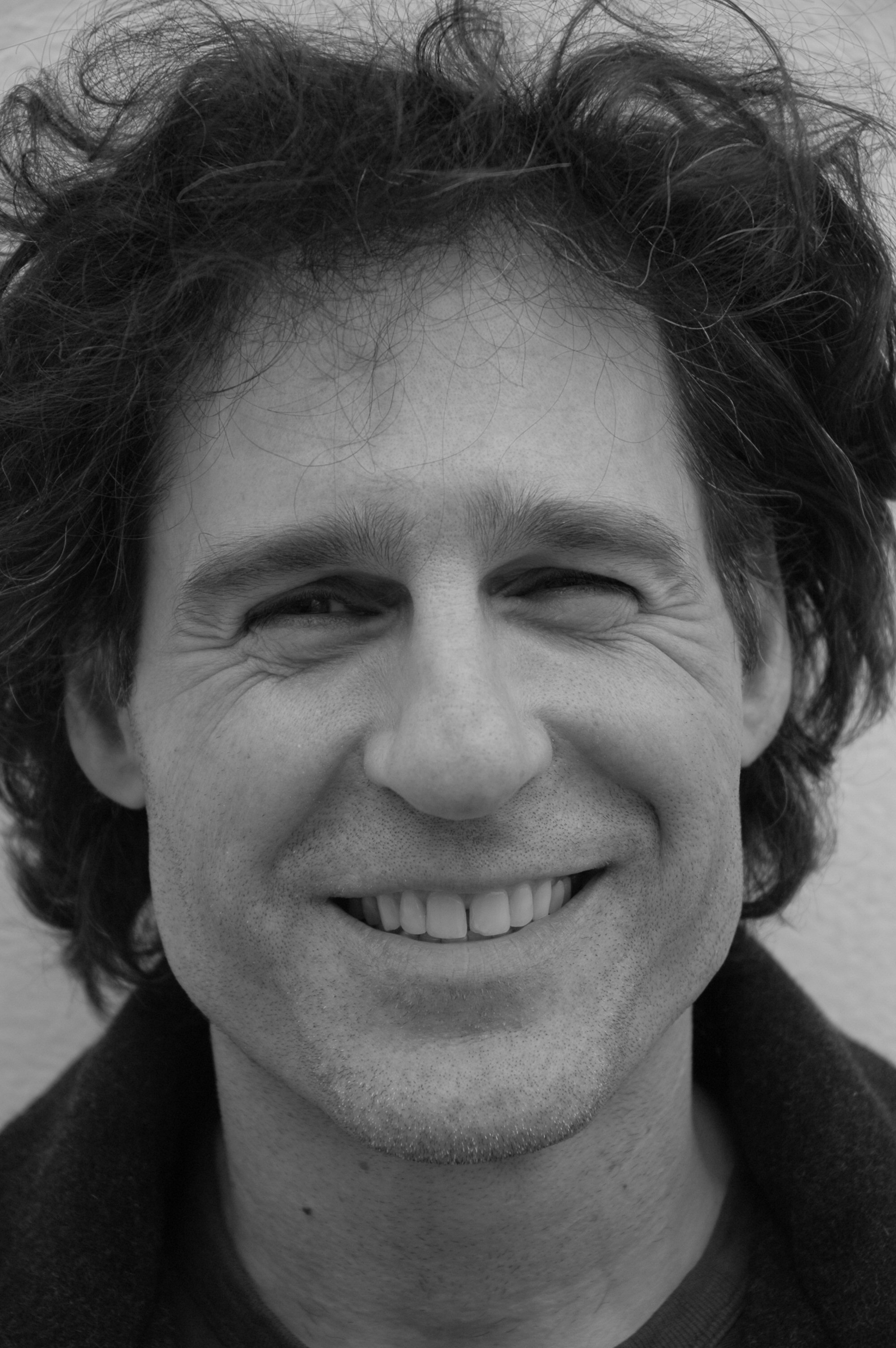
- Peter Catalanotto
- Born: Brooklyn, New York, U.S.
- Education: Pratt Institute
- Known for: Illustration
- Notable work: Matthew A. B. C., Ivan the Terrier, Emily's Art, Question Boy Meets Little Miss Know-it-All, Monkey & Robot
- Awards: Numerous Children's Choice nominations, Drexel University's Contribution to Children's Literature, PLA's Award of Excellence.
- Website: petercatalanotto.com

Peter Catalanotto is an American book illustrator.

== Background ==
Peter Catalanotto was born in March 1959 in Brooklyn, NY, and grew up in East Northport, Long Island, where he attended Elwood-John Glenn High School. Educated at the Pratt Institute, Peter's career as an illustrator began in the 1980s, painting jackets for young adult books and illustrating for newspapers and magazines. In 1987 he was asked to illustrate All I See by Cynthia Rylant. Peter then went on to write several picture books, the first being Dylan's Day Out, published in 1989. He has since published over 45 books, 19 of which he also wrote, including Matthew A.B.C. (2005), Emily's Art (2006), Ivan the Terrier (2007), Question Boy Meets Little Miss Know-It-All (2012), and his Monkey & Robot series. Peter teaches the first children's book writing course offered at both Columbia University and Pratt Institute. In 2008, the First Lady, Laura Bush, commissioned him to illustrate the White House holiday brochure.

== Selected bibliography ==
=== Written and Illustrated by Catalanotto ===
- Dylan's Day Out (1989)
- Mr.Mumble (1990)
- Christmas Always (1991)
- The Painter (1995)
- Dad and Me (1999)
- Daisy 1, 2, 3 (2003)
- Kitten Red, Yellow, Blue (2005)
- Matthew A.B.C. (2005)
- Emily's Art (2001)
- Ivan the Terrier (2007)
- Question Boy Meets Little Miss Know-It-All (2012)
- Monkey & Robot (2013)
- More of Monkey & Robot (2014)
- The Newbies (2015)
- Monkey & Robot: Friends and Neighbors (2019)
- Monkey & Robot: Flights of Fancy (2022)

Second Grade Friends Series, written by Catalanotto and Pamela Schembri, illustrated by Catalanotto

- The Secret Lunch Special (2006)
- No More Pumpkins (2007)
- The Veterans Day Visitor (2008)

=== Illustrated by Catalanotto ===
- All I See by Cynthia Rylant (1987)
- Soda Jerk by Cynthia Rylant (1990)
- Cecil's Story by George Ella Lyon (1991)
- An Angel for Solomon Singer by Cynthia Rylant (1992)
- Who Came Down That Road? by George Ella Lyon (1992)
- Dreamplace by George Ella Lyon (1993)
- The Catspring Somersault One-Handed Flip-Flop by SuAnn Kiser (1993)
- Dark Cloud Strong Breeze by Susan Patrone (1994)
- Mama is a Miner by George Ella Lyon (1994)
- A Day at Damp Camp by George Ella Lyon (1996)
- My House has Stars by Megan McDonald (1996)
- Celebrate! Stories of the Jewish Holidays by Gilda Berger (1997)
- The Circle of Thanks by Susi Gregg Fowler (1997)
- Getting Used to the Dark by Susan Marie Swanson (1997)
- The Rolling Store by Angela Johnson (1997)
- The Longest Wait by Marie Bradbury (1998)
- Letter to the Lake by Susan Marie Swanson (1998)
- Book by George Ella Lyon (1999)
- The Dream Shop by Katharine Kenah (2000)
- Mother to Tigers by George Ella Lyon (2002)
- We Wanted You by Liz Rosenberg (2002)
- My Mother's Voice by Joanne Ryder (2003)
- Happy Birthday, America by Mary Pope Osborne (2003)
- No Dessert Forever! by George Ella Lyon (2007)
- Sleep Song by George Ella Lyon (2009)
- Good-bye, Sheepie by Robert Burleigh (2010)
- A Penny from My Sister by Letty Sustrin (2020)
