= Walt Whitman High School (New York) =

Coordinates: 40°49′35″N 73°25′30″W

Location
- 301 West Hills Road; Huntington Station, New York; United States

Information
- Type: Public high school
- Established: 1956
- School district: South Huntington Union Free School District
- Principal: John Murphy
- Grades: 9–12
- Enrollment: 1,981 (2023-2024)
- Campus: Suburban
- Mascot: Wildcat
- National ranking: 2/100
- Website: Walt Whitman High School

Walt Whitman High School is a four-year public secondary school located at 301 West Hills Road, in Huntington Station, New York. It is the South Huntington Union Free School District's only high school, serving students in Huntington Station, South Huntington, Melville, and West Hills. The school typically has around 2,000 students in grades 9–12.

== History ==
=== The Central School ===
The need for a high school for the South Huntington Union Free School District arose with the district, as the rising population of the area caused a need for a high school. The state would not let either district in the area – South Huntington Common District #12 or West Hills Common District #13 – get one. So, they merged into one and birthed the modern district in 1924. The district (being that it was now union-free) was now able to have a high school. So, the Central School was opened in 1928 and graduated its first class in 1931. From 1924 to 1931, between the opening of the district and first Central School graduating class, South Huntington students went to Huntington High School instead. From 1928 to 1956, the Central School served as the district's high school. In 1954, a grassroots campaign was organized to approve the addition of four schools to the district, including a new high school. The additions passed, and Walt Whitman High School opened for the 1956–57 school year and became the high school of the district, serving grades 8–12. The Central School then shifted to serving 6th-7th graders for the year, and later became an elementary school. In the early 1970s, it became an annex and was later sold in the early 1980s. The district would replace the Central School with Walt Whitman as the district's high school.

=== Students from other districts going to Whitman ===
Before the formation of the Cold Spring Harbor Central School District, students in the area would go to one of three high schools after eighth grade. Huntington High School (known as Simpson at the time), Oyster Bay High School, or Walt Whitman. Eventually, the three schools could no longer support the students from the students in the area of the modern Cold Spring Harbor Central School District. Hence, similarly to the formation of South Huntington, the districts in the area had to merge in 1958 and they gained their own high school, meaning these students no longer had to go to Whitman.

== Notable alumni ==
- Michael Campbell of the punk rock band Latterman
- Jazzy Collins, producer and Emmy Award-winning casting director graduated in 2010.
- Adam Ferrara, actor, comedian
- Jimmy Haslip, founder and bass player of the jazz fusion group "The Yellowjackets" graduated in 1970.
- Bruce Kapler, former sax player on the Late Show with David Letterman graduated in 1971.
- Neal Marlens, creator of the sitcoms The Wonder Years, Growing Pains and Ellen.
- Laura Pergolizzi, pop/rock singer and songwriter
- Tim Stearns, professor at Stanford University, graduated in 1979
- Genevievette Walker-Lightfoot, attorney
- Jesse Zook Mann, Emmy Award-winning television and film director graduated in 1998

=== Athletes ===
- Antoine Agudio, Former professional basketball player
- Dan Calichman, MLS player
- Gerry Cooney, boxer
- Tom Gugliotta, NBA player
- James "Jimmy" Jerkens, Thoroughbred horse racing trainer, graduated 1977
- Myles Jones, professional lacrosse player
- A. J. Preller, MLB executive

== Sports ==
Walt Whitman High School host varsity teams in badminton, baseball, basketball, bowling, cheerleading, cross country, fencing, football, field hockey, kickline, lacrosse, soccer, softball, swimming, tennis, track and field, volleyball and wrestling.

In 1964 and 1966, Walt Whitman High School hosted the 2nd and 4th annual NYSPHSAA state wrestling tournaments. The event didn't return to Long Island again until Nassau Veterans Memorial Coliseum hosted it in 2006. They won the State Championship for soccer in 2015.

== Athletic championships ==
- Football 1974 Suffolk County Conference AAA Champions defeating Huntington 32-30 in final, Rutger's Cup Champions (awarded). 1984 Suffolk County Division 1 Champions defeating Sachem 17–14 in the championship (This was as far as the team could have gone in those two seasons. The Long Island Football Championships were not instituted until 1992). Whitman won the Suffolk County championship in 2021, dominating the regular season with an undefeated season, before losing to Massapequa in the Division 1 title game.
- Baseball 1975, 1976 Long Island Champions
- Cross Country 1975 New York State Champion
- Cross Country 2008 Section XI Suffolk County Champions (Class AA)
- Girls Varsity Basketball had a long playoff run in 2013, before falling to Sachem East in the Suffolk County Class AA championship.
- Boys Varsity Soccer won the New York State championship in 2015 after winning both Suffolk County and Long Island.
- Indoor Color Guard, 2017 National Champions.
- Girls Soccer 1985, 1986 and 1992 New York State Champions At one point in the year 2000, the Wildcats were ranked number one in the country.
- Tennis 2011 unseeded Brandon Stone wins Suffolk County title 5-7, 7-6(5), 7-5 over Jeremy Dubin of South Hampton.
- Marching band, 2026 NYSFBC large school 3 champions
