= James H. Boyd Intermediate School =

Coordinates: 40°50′52″N 73°20′33″W

Location
- 286 Cuba Hill Road; Huntington, New York; USA

Information
- Type: Public
- Established: 1955
- Principal: Elissa Millan
- Enrollment: 633
- Colors: Blue and White
- Website: Elwood District Webpage

James H Boyd Intermediate School, formerly Cuba Hill School, is a three-year Intermediate School that teaches grades 3–5. It is part of the Elwood School District in Huntington, New York.

== History ==
Cuba Hill School was built in 1955 as a replacement to Elwood's aging Little Red Schoolhouse (formally called Elwood School), which opened in 1903 and still stands abandoned on Cuba Hill Road to this day. At that point the school comprised solely what is today the third and fourth grade wing. An annex to the school was constructed as a standalone building in the mid-1960s, and today serves as the fifth grade wing.

The school was renamed after the first superintendent of the Elwood Union Free School District James H. Boyd in 1983.

The two formerly separate buildings were connected in 2001 with the addition of a new auditorium.
