= Danny Burawa =

American baseball pitcher (born 1988)

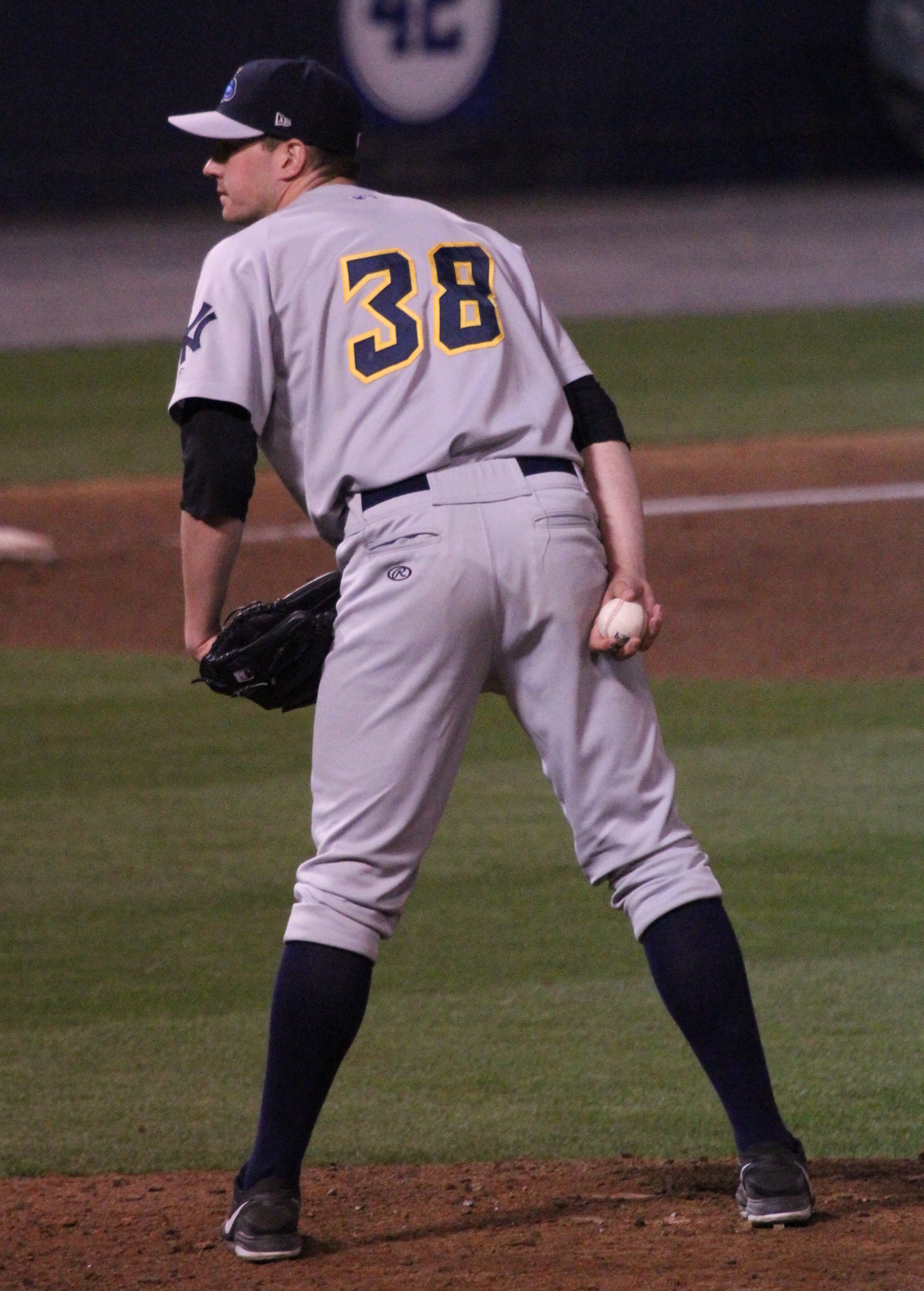
- Burawa with the Trenton Thunder in 2013
- Pitcher
- Born: December 30, 1988 (age 37); Rocky Point, New York, U.S.
- Batted: Right Threw: Right

MLB debut
- June 21, 2015, for the New York Yankees

Last MLB appearance
- October 2, 2015, for the Atlanta Braves

MLB statistics
- Win–loss record: 0–0
- Earned run average: 6.23
- Strikeouts: 11
- Stats at Baseball Reference

Teams
- New York Yankees (2015); Atlanta Braves (2015)

Daniel James Burawa (born December 30, 1988) is an American former Major League Baseball (MLB) pitcher who played for the New York Yankees and Atlanta Braves in 2015, and also played internationally for the Israel national baseball team.

== Early life ==
Burawa was born in Riverhead, New York, to Paul and Denise Burawa.

== Amateur career ==
Burawa attended Rocky Point High School in Rocky Point, New York, on the North Shore of Long Island, where he pitched for the Eagles. During his junior year, he threw two no-hitters. He was two-time All-League, and as a senior was All-County and All-Long Island.

Burawa first attended Suffolk Community College. After his freshman year, he transferred to St. John's University in 2009. After redshirting his sophomore year, Burawa played for the St. John's Red Storm baseball team in the Big East Conference. In his one year at St. John's, Burawa as the team's closer had a 1.02 ERA with 1 win and 8 saves, as in 18 innings he had 27 strikeouts and 8 walks. In 2009, he played collegiate summer baseball for the Madison Mallards in the Northwoods League, and in 2010, he played collegiate summer baseball with the Harwich Mariners of the Cape Cod Baseball League.

== Professional career ==
=== New York Yankees ===
The New York Yankees selected Burawa in the 12th round of the 2010 Major League Baseball draft, and signed him for a signing bonus of $300,000. That year he pitched seven innings in relief for the Staten Island Yankees of the Low-A New York-Pennsylvania League.

In 2011, Burawa pitched for the Charleston RiverDogs in the Single-A South Atlantic League, going 3–2 with three saves and a 3.63 ERA. He then pitched for the Tampa Yankees of the High-A Florida State League, going 2–2 with two saves and a 3.66 ERA.

During spring training in 2012, Burawa suffered a tear to his oblique muscle and a cracked rib, which cost him the entire season. At the time his fastball was 93–95 mph, and he also threw a slurve (combination curveball and slider) at 75–78 mph.

In 2013, Burawa pitched for the Trenton Thunder of the Double-A Eastern League. He pitched to a 6–3 win–loss record with four saves and a 2.59 earned run average (ERA) and 66 strikeouts in 66 innings pitched over 46 relief appearances. He was throwing a 95–98 mph fastball, and a mid 80s slider.

The Yankees invited Burawa to spring training in 2014. He pitched for the Trenton Thunder, recording one save and a 1.59 ERA with 18 strikeouts in 17 innings across 11 relief appearances. He also pitched for the Scranton/Wilkes-Barre RailRiders of the Triple-A International League, going 3–1 with three saves and a 5.95 ERA and 55 strikeouts in 42 1/3 innings over 31 relief appearances.

After the 2014 season, the Yankees added Burawa to their 40-man roster, in order to protect him from the Rule 5 draft. Burawa began the 2015 season with Scranton/Wilkes-Barre. After pitching to a 1.75 ERA in 26 appearances, the Yankees promoted him to the major leagues for the first time on June 21. He made his major league debut that night, allowing four runs on three hits in 2/3 of an inning, and was optioned to the minor leagues after the game. Burawa was designated for assignment by the Yankees on August 5. For the season, with Scranton/Wilkes-Barre he was 1–3 with one save and a 2.55 ERA in 32 games, and in three starts with Trenton he had a 3.27 ERA.

=== Atlanta Braves ===
On August 14, 2015, the Atlanta Braves claimed Burawa off of waivers, They assigned him to the Gwinnett Braves of the International League, where in 4 relief appearances he had a 2.08 ERA. He was called up by the Braves on September 1, when rosters expanded. He appeared in 12 games in relief for Atlanta, and had a 3.65 ERA.

In 2016, Burawa pitched for the Mississippi Braves of the Double-A Southern League, and was 2–0 with a 6.75 ERA in 9 relief appearances. Pitching for Gwinnett, he was 1–0 with one save and a 5.14 ERA in 7 relief appearances. Burawa was released by the Braves organization on June 3, 2016.

=== Long Island Ducks ===
On July 15, 2016, Burawa signed with the Long Island Ducks of the Atlantic League of Professional Baseball, an independent baseball league. In 22 relief appearances for the Ducks, Burawa registered an 0-1 record and 5.09 ERA with 17 strikeouts across 17 2/3 innings pitched.

=== Bridgeport Bluefish ===
On April 6, 2017, he signed with the Bridgeport Bluefish of the Atlantic League of Professional Baseball. In 22 outings for Bridgeport, Burawa posted a 2-2 record and 7.78 ERA with 24 strikeouts over 19 2/3 innings of work. He was released by the Bluefish on June 26.

== Team Israel; World Baseball Classic ==
Burawa pitched for Team Israel at the 2017 World Baseball Classic in March 2017.
