= Dix Hills, New York =

- Hamlet and census-designated place
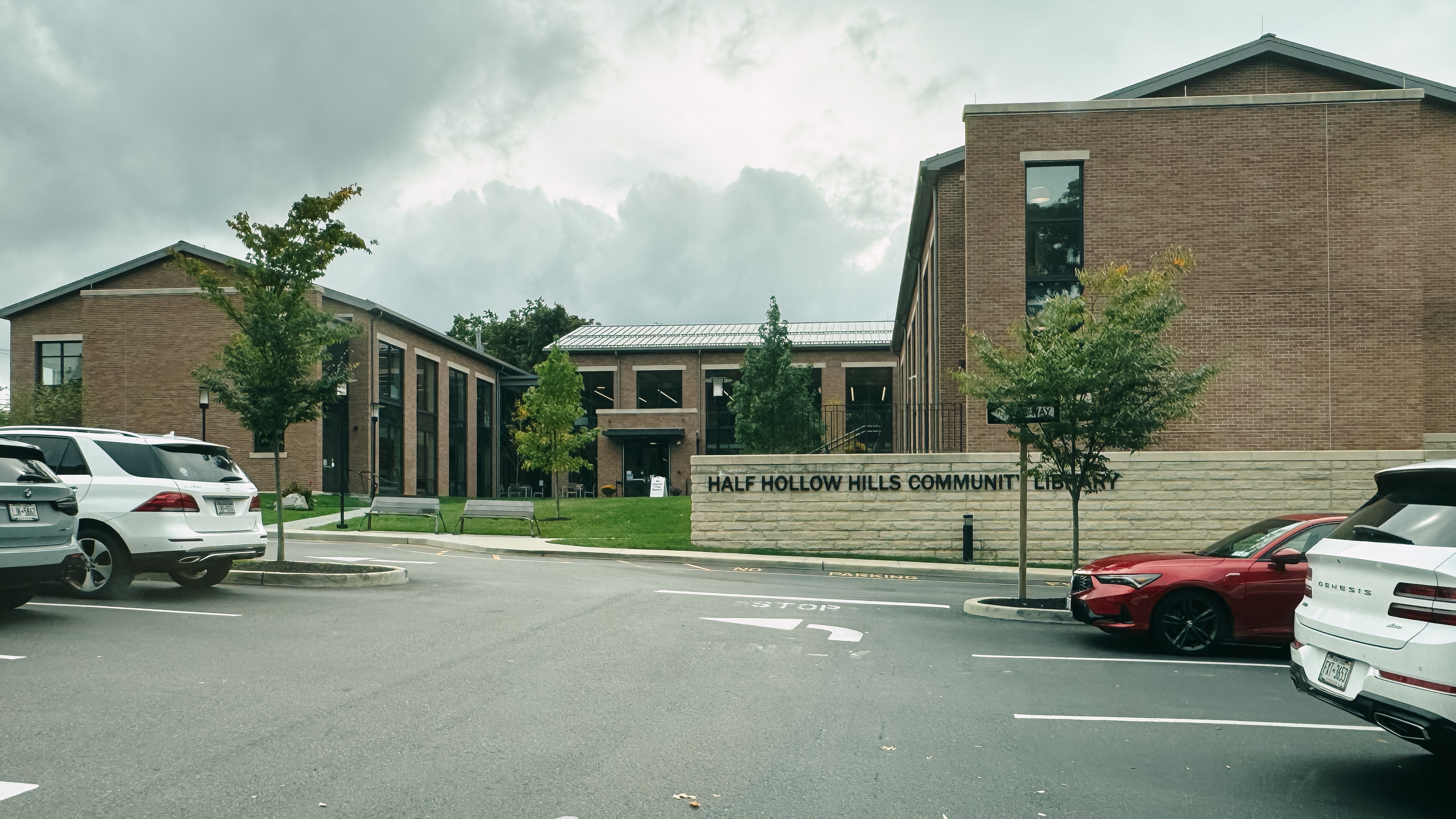
- The Half Hollow Hills Community Library, located within Dix Hills

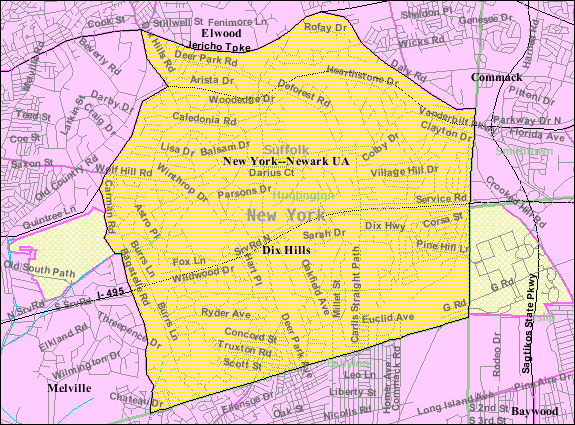
- U.S. Census map

- Location on Long Island Location within the state of New York
- Coordinates: 40°47′46″N 73°20′4″W
- Country: United States
- State: New York
- County: Suffolk
- Town: Huntington

Area
  - Total: 15.75 sq mi (40.79 km^{2})
  - Land: 15.75 sq mi (40.79 km^{2})
  - Water: 0 sq mi (0.00 km^{2})
- Elevation: 203 ft (62 m)

Population (2020)
  - Total: 26,180
  - Density: 1,662.3/sq mi (641.81/km^{2})
- Time zone: UTC-5 (Eastern (EST))
  - Summer (DST): UTC-4 (EDT)
- ZIP code: 11746
- Area codes: 631, 934
- FIPS code: 36-20687
- GNIS feature ID: 1867400

Dix Hills is a hamlet and census-designated place (CDP) located within the Town of Huntington in Suffolk County, on Long Island, in New York, United States. The population was 26,180 at the time of the 2020 census.

== History ==
Settlers traded goods with the Indigenous Secatogue tribe for the land that became Dix Hills in 1699. The Secatogues lived in the northern portion of the region during the later half of that century. The land was known as Dick's Hills. By lore, the name traces to a local native named Dick Pechegan, likely of the Secatogues. (Note: Pechegan's name appeared on a 1692 deed to William Massey.) Scholar William Wallace Tooker wrote that the addition of the English name "Dick" to the indigenous name "Pechegan" was a common practice.

Tooker wrote that Pechegan's wigwam and his planted fields became the hilly area's namesake, known as the shortened "Dix Hills" by 1911. The area was mostly used for farming until after World War II.

In 1941, a ranch house featured at the World of Tomorrow exhibit at the 1939 New York World's Fair was purchased by real estate developer J. Franklin Bradley, who at the time was creating a new housing development in Dix Hills. Bradley relocated the house to this new development in the hamlet, where it was rebuilt to its original World's Fair specifications.

In the 1950s, Dix Hills and its neighbors Wheatley Heights and Melville, along with the area known as Sweet Hollow, proposed to incorporate as a single village. This village – which would have been known as the Incorporated Village of Half Hollow Hills – would have had an area of roughly 50 square miles (130 km^{2}), with its boundaries essentially co-terminus with those of the Half Hollow Hills Central School District (C.S.D. No. 5). The plans were unsuccessful, and these areas would remain unincorporated.

Proposals were revived around 2001, when Dix Hills, Melville, Wheatley Heights, and East Farmingdale (all within the school district) proposed incorporating as a single village. These plans also failed, and as of 2025, all of these community remain unincorporated hamlets.

Historically Dix Hills had its own post office, however in 1870 it closed and all routes were merged with the Elwood post office. This post office closed in 1902

== Geography ==
According to the United States Census Bureau, the CDP of Dix Hills has a total area of 15.9 square miles (41.3 km^{2}), all of it land.

Dix Hills is located centrally on Long Island, on the southern edge of the Town of Huntington, bordering the Town of Babylon to its south.

The Long Island Expressway passes almost straight through the middle of the hamlet.

== Demographics ==
Historical population
Census	Pop.	Note	%±
2000	26,024		—
2010	26,892		3.3%
2020	26,180		−2.6%

=== 2020 census ===
As of the 2020 census, Dix Hills had a population of 26,180. The population density was 1,662.3 per square mile. The median age was 43.8 years. 22.3% of residents were under the age of 18 and 18.3% of residents were 65 years of age or older. For every 100 females there were 97.9 males, and for every 100 females age 18 and over there were 96.0 males age 18 and over.

100.0% of residents lived in urban areas, while 0.0% lived in rural areas.

There were 8,016 households in Dix Hills, of which 39.1% had children under the age of 18 living in them. Of all households, 74.9% were married-couple households, 8.6% were households with a male householder and no spouse or partner present, and 14.0% were households with a female householder and no spouse or partner present. About 10.3% of all households were made up of individuals and 6.8% had someone living alone who was 65 years of age or older.

There were 8,315 housing units, of which 3.6% were vacant. The homeowner vacancy rate was 0.9% and the rental vacancy rate was 4.5%.

Racial composition as of the 2020 census
Race	Number	Percent
White	17,574	67.1%
Black or African American	1,481	5.7%
American Indian and Alaska Native	71	0.3%
Asian	4,409	16.8%
Native Hawaiian and Other Pacific Islander	11	0.0%
Some other race	762	2.9%
Two or more races	1,872	7.2%
Hispanic or Latino (of any race)	2,224	8.5%

=== Income ===
The median household income (in 2021 dollars) in Dix Hills was $184,580. The per capita income for Dix Hills was $75,486. About 4.9% of the population was below the poverty line.

=== Other statistics ===
About 25.6% of the population spoke a language other than English at home. Dix Hills had Long Island's highest number of electric vehicles on the road by ZIP Code as of 2023.

== Arts and culture ==
Dix Hills is part of the Half Hollow Hills Community Library.

== Education ==
Dix Hills is primarily served by the Half Hollow Hills Central School District although a small portion located in the south east is within the Commack School District. The Half Hollow Hills elementary schools are Otsego, Paumanok, Signal Hill, Sunquam, and Vanderbilt.

Middle schools that serve the district are Candlewood Middle School and West Hollow Middle School. The high schools are Half Hollow Hills High School East and Half Hollow Hills High School West. Commack Middle School and Rolling Hills Elementary are both a part of the Commack School District and are located within Dix Hills.

Five Towns College is also located within Dix Hills.

== Infrastructure ==
=== Emergency services ===
Dix Hills is served by the Dix Hills Fire Department, through three stations. The Dix Hills Fire Department consists of approximately 150 volunteer firefighters and emergency medical technicians who respond to over 2,500 calls for assistance each year.

== Notable people ==
- Brian Bloom, actor
- Bob Bourne, NHL player
- Ernest P. Buffett, businessman, father of congressman Howard Buffett, grandfather of billionaire investor Warren Buffett
- Gidone Busch, New York City Police Department shooting victim
- John Coltrane, jazz saxophonist and composer (John Coltrane Home)
- Clark Gillies, NHL player
- Tobias Harris, NBA player
- Steve Israel, former New York congressman
- Mark LoMonaco of The Dudley Boyz, pro wrestler
- Ralph Macchio, actor
- Kyle Merber, professional runner
- Cathy Moriarty, actress
- Greg Mottola, writer-director
- Cameron Ocasio, actor
- Todd Phillips, writer-director
- Samantha Prahalis, WNBA basketball player
- Michael Prywes, writer-director
- Jenna Rose, entertainer
- Dee Snider, singer, Twisted Sister
- Ryan Star, singer-songwriter
- Wesley Walker, NFL player
- Debbie Wasserman Schultz, Congresswoman, former chair of the Democratic National Convention, Hills East '84
- Chris Weidman, UFC fighter
- Judd Winick, cartoonist
- Gary Wood (1942–1994), NFL quarterback
- Jon Bellion, singer-songwriter
