= Dawn Dunlop =

U.S. Air Force general

Dawn M. Dunlop
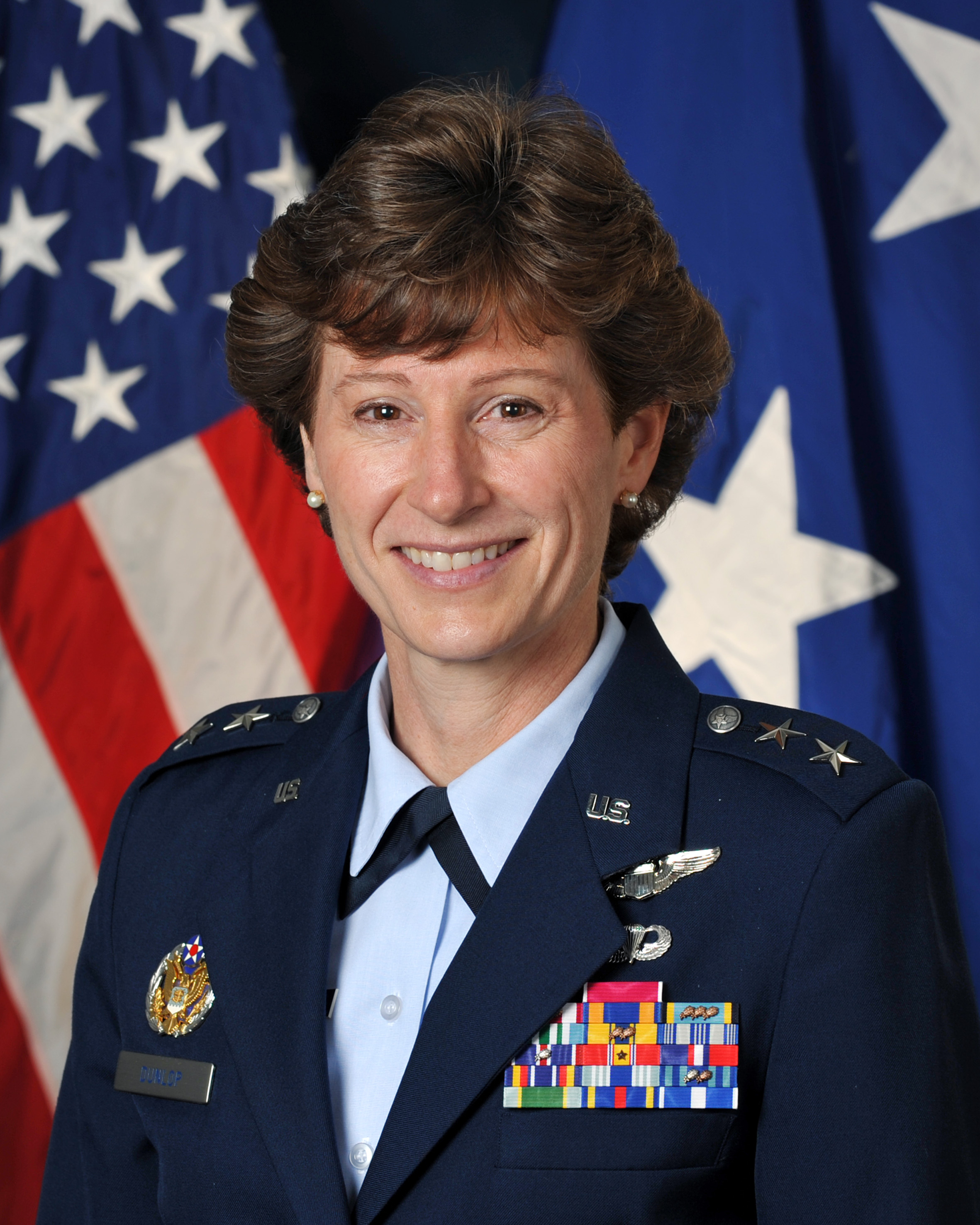
- Military career
- Allegiance: United States
- Branch: United States Air Force
- Service years: 1988–2021
- Rank: Major General
- Commands: NATO Airborne Early Warning and Control Force; 412th Test Wing; 586th Flight Test Squadron
- Conflicts: Iraqi no-fly zones conflict
- Awards: Defense Superior Service Medal; Legion of Merit (3); Air Medal

Dawn M. Dunlop is a retired United States Air Force Major General. Prior to her retirement she served as the Director, Operational Capability Requirements, Deputy Chief of Staff for Strategy, Integration, and Requirements, Headquarters U.S. Air Force.

In 1993, Dunlop was selected as one of the first U.S. women to fly combat aircraft. Later, she was also the first woman to fly the F-22 and to command a Test Wing.

Prior to her retirement, Dunlop was the highest ranking female fighter pilot in the Air Force. As a command pilot, she accumulated more than 3,500 flying hours, primarily in the F-22, F-15C, F-15E, T-38, F-16 and NE-3A.

== Early life and education ==
Dunlop graduated from Huntington High School in New York, where she was a recruited as an athlete to attend the U.S. Air Force Academy in Colorado Springs. She was a volleyball standout there, earning Academic All-American MVP honors in 1987 and the Academy's Athletic Leadership Award in 1988.

In 1988 Dunlop received her Bachelor of Science in Engineering Sciences from the U.S. Air Force Academy and in 1989 received a Master of Science in Mechanical Engineering and Civil Engineering from Columbia University in New York.

== Career ==
Dunlop was commissioned as a second lieutenant in the United States Air Force on June 1, 1988. Her first assignment was as a Guggenheim Fellow at Columbia University in New York. After receiving her graduate degree she went to undergraduate pilot training at Williams Air Force Base in Arizona where she graduated #2 of 33 in her class. At the time women were not allowed to select fighter aircraft, so Dunlop took an assignment as a T-38 instructor pilot. She transferred to Beale Air Force Base in California in 1993, but soon after was selected as one of the first seven women assigned to U.S. Air Force combat aircraft.

After training at Seymour Johnson Air Force Base in North Carolina, she was assigned to the 492nd Fighter Squadron at RAF Lakenheath in England, becoming the first U.S. female fighter pilot in Europe. In 1996, Dunlop flew F-15E combat missions during Operation Provide Comfort in northern Iraq. In 1997 Dunlop was selected to the U.S. Air Force Test Pilot School at Edwards Air Force Base (AFB) in California, where she graduated as the Top Graduate. She was then assigned to the 445th Flight Test Squadron where she became the chief F-15 pilot. Dunlop later returned to Edwards AFB as the F-22 Operations Officer from 2003 to 2005.

=== Command ===
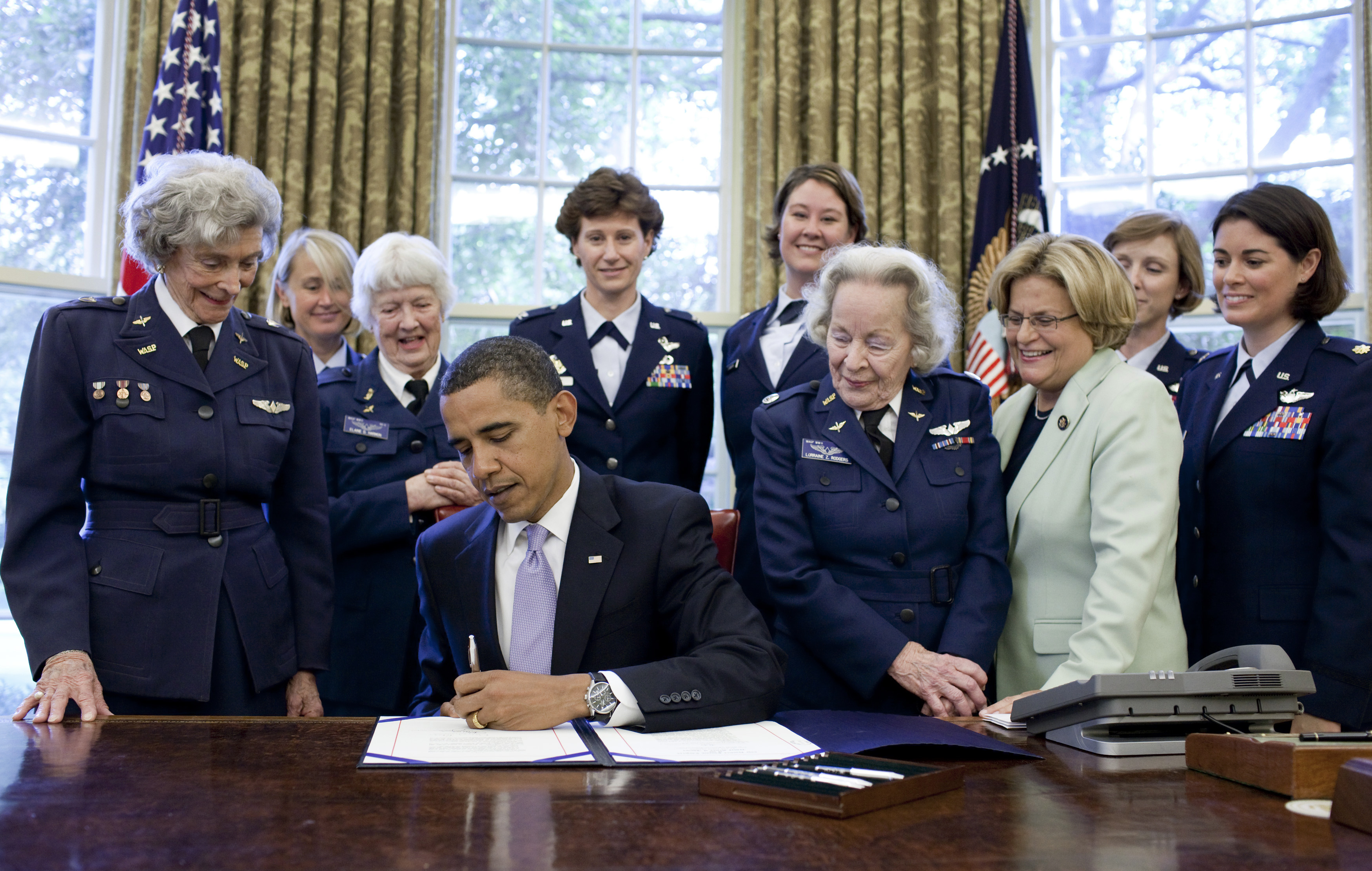
Dunlop stands behind President Barack Obama as he signs the Women Airforce Service Pilots Congressional Gold Medal bill into law on July 1, 2009.

From 2005 to 2007 Dunlop commanded the 586th Flight Test Squadron at Holloman Air Force Base in New Mexico, after which she was selected for the White House Fellows program. She then served as Chief, Air Force Senate Liaison before returning to Edwards AFB as the Vice Commander and then Commander of the 412th Test Wing, becoming the first Air Force woman to command a Test Wing. In 2015 Dunlop assumed her role as Commander, NATO Airborne Early Warning and Control Force.

In 2018 Dunlop was assigned as Director, DOD Special Access Program Central Office (SAPCO). She was removed from the position in May 2019 due to inspector general investigations regarding toxic work environment complaints. The Air Force subsequently assigned Dunlop as Director, Operational Capability Requirements in the Deputy Chief of Staff for Strategic, Integration, and Requirements. She retired in November 2021 in the grade of Major General.

Military offices
Preceded by Jochen Both	Commander of the NATO Airborne Early Warning and Control Force; 2015–2018	Succeeded by Jörg Lebert
Preceded by John P. Horner	Director of Special Access Program Central Office of the Office of the Secretary of Defense; 2018–2019	Succeeded by Dan Caine
Preceded by James A. Dunn	Director of Operational Capability Requirements of the United States Air Force; 2020–2021	Succeeded by Thomas J. Lawhead
