= James Hare (judge) =

American politician and judge

Judge of the Alabama Fourth Judicial Circuit
- In office 1954–1969
- Appointed by: Gordon Persons

Member of the Alabama House of Representatives from the Dallas County district
- In office 1934–1940

Personal details
- Born: James Albert Hare Jr. May 17, 1906 Massillon, Alabama, U.S.
- Died: May 20, 1969 (aged 63) Selma, Alabama, U.S.
- Resting place: Old Live Oak Cemetery
- Party: Democratic
- Spouse: Katheryn Terrell
- Children: 4
- Relatives: Rebecca Cokley (granddaughter)
- Education: Marion Military Institute; University of Alabama (LLB)

Military service
- Allegiance: United States
- Branch/service: United States Army
- Years of service: 1942–1946
- Rank: Lieutenant Colonel
- Unit: United States Army Air Corps
- Battles/wars: World War II • China Burma India Theater

James Albert Hare Jr. (May 17, 1906 – May 20, 1969) was a politician from the U.S. state of Alabama and a veteran of the United States Army during World War II. He served as an assistant state Attorney General, a county solicitor, a member of the Alabama House of Representatives, and an Alabama circuit court judge. He was an active defender of Jim Crow segregation as a judge.

== Biography ==
James Albert Hare Jr. was born May 17, 1906, at Massillon in Dallas County, Alabama. His parents were James Albert Hare and Betty May Kendrick. He received his education through the public schools of Marion Junction and graduated from Marion Military Institute in 1925. He enrolled at the University of Alabama and earned a bachelor of law degree in 1929.

Hare served six years as a member of the Alabama House of Representatives from Dallas County (1934–1940). He was also appointed as an Alabama assistant Attorney General (1940–1942). He enlisted into the United States Army Air Corps (USAAC) as a lieutenant during World War II. He served in the China-Burma-India theatre and was honorably discharged as a lieutenant colonel in 1946. Hare was appointed as circuit solicitor (1946–1954) and later appointed Judge of the Fourth Judicial Circuit of Alabama (1954). The jurisdiction of his court covered Bibb, Dallas, Hale, Perry, and Wilcox counties in central Alabama.

His civic involvements included membership in the college fraternities of Chi Phi and Phi Delta Phi, a board of trustees member of the Sturdivant Museum and Marion Institute, a board of directors member for the Marion Institute Educational Foundation, and part of the congregation of St. Paul's Episcopal Church in Selma.

Hare married Katheryn Terrell on September 12, 1942, in Waco, Texas. They had four children - Susan Nowlin Hare, James Albert Hare III, Virginia Terrell Hare, and William Terrell Hare. He died at Selma Hospital on May 20, 1969. He is interred at New Live Oak Cemetery in Selma, Alabama.

== Opposition to civil rights ==
During his tenure as a judge, Hare made efforts to thwart the civil rights movement in Alabama. In July of the Freedom Summer of 1964, Hare issued an injunction forbidding any gathering of three or more people under sponsorship of civil rights organizations. The injunction, signed by Judge Hare on July 9, 1964, made it illegal to even talk to more than two people at a time about civil rights or voter registration in Selma, even (and especially) during church services. Because it was an injunction, rather than a law, Hare could jail anyone who, in his sole opinion, violated it. As a result, mass meetings were halted, and for the remainder of 1964, there were no public civil rights movement events in Selma. Organization efforts were driven deep underground except for the bravest activists, and the movement was paralyzed.
