= JudyAnn Bigby =

American politician

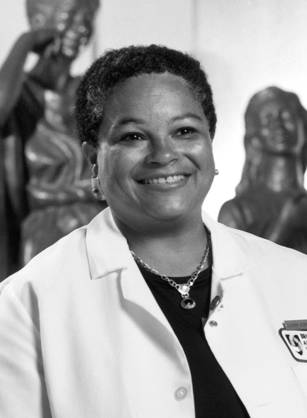

Massachusetts Secretary of Health and Human Services
- In office 2007–2013
- Preceded by: Timothy R. Murphy
- Succeeded by: John Polanowicz

Personal details
- Born: 1951 (age 74–75)
- Education: Wellesley College; Harvard Medical School
- Occupation: Secretary of the Executive Office of Health and Human Services of the Commonwealth of Massachusetts

JudyAnn Bigby is an American doctor and the former secretary of the Executive Office of Health and Human Services of the Commonwealth of Massachusetts from 2007 to 2013. She currently serves as director of the Harvard Medical School Center of Excellence in Women's health.

Prior to becoming secretary, Bigby was a primary care physician and medical director of Community Health Programs at Brigham and Women's Hospital. One of her patients was Boston mayor Thomas Menino, who declared January 18, 2001 "Dr JudyAnn Bigby Day" in Boston. In addition to her work as a doctor, Bigby was also an associate professor of medicine at Harvard Medical School and director of the school's Center of Excellence in Women's Health.

A resident of Jamaica Plain, Bigby holds a B.A. from Wellesley College and an M.D. from Harvard Medical School.
