= Cold Spring Harbor Central School District =

Public school district in New York, United States

Location
- Cold Spring Harbor, Suffolk County, New York; United States

District information
- Grades: K-12
- Established: 1958
- President: Heather Morante Young
- Superintendent: Joseph Monastero
- Schools: 4

Students and staff
- Students: 1,561
- District mascot: Seahawks
- Colors: Red and blue

Other information
- District Offices: 75 Goose Hill Road Cold Spring Harbor, NY 11724
- Website: www.csh.k12.ny.us

Cold Spring Harbor Central School District is an American school district in the towns of Huntington and Oyster Bay on the border of Suffolk County, New York and Nassau County, New York on the North Shore of Long Island. In Suffolk County, the district serves all of Lloyd Harbor, almost the entirety of Cold Spring Harbor, and a small part of Huntington. In Nassau, the district serves the overwhelming majority of Laurel Hollow and a small part of Oyster Bay.

== History ==
=== History of the West Side Schools ===
There are three schools that preceded the modern West Side School. The very first school in the area was the Bungtown School. It was finished construction and was opened in 1790. During construction, it was visited by George Washington, the president of the time. The school was used for over a hundred years, before its closure in 1895. In 1894, right before the first school closed, a new spot was chosen for a new schoolhouse. Built in 1896, the second schoolhouse was placed on the corner of modern Moores Hill Road and Route 25A in Laurel Hollow. This schoolhouse was used for over forty years and served students first grade through eighth grade before its closing in 1940. In 1938, before the closing of the second West Side School (in very similar fashion to the transition between the first and second schoolhouse), there was a committee to decide the location of the next school. They decided to build the school, which is today's West Side School, in Syosset on Laurel Hollow Road. The school served students K-8, and was part of its own district (West Side #11) until the merger that created today's district in 1958. It continues to serve students grades 2-6, with Goosehill Primary School having taken over K-1 students and Cold Spring Harbor Jr./Sr, High School carrying 7th and 8th grade students respectively. Lloyd Harbor School also serves students grades 2–6 in the district.

=== Creation of the Modern District ===
Before the modern district, there used to be three districts where today's district is located. The Lloyd Harbor, East Side, and West Side school districts were all originally K-8 districts with students moving on to one of three nearby high schools; Huntington High School (known then as Simpson) and Walt Whitman High School in Suffolk County and Oyster Bay High School in Nassau County. As the districts grew, they soon had enough students that the high schools were being overpowered. At the end of a thorough process involving hiring a consultant, the New York State Education Department, and a petition, the districts decided to merge and centralize into one. The result was the modern Cold Spring Harbor Central School District, formed in 1958.

== Schools ==
The following is a table of the schools in the Cold Spring Harbor Central School District.

School name	Type of school	Address	Grades	Principal
Cold Spring Harbor Jr./Sr. High School	Jr./Sr. High School	82 Turkey Lane Cold Spring Harbor, NY 11724	7-12	Daniel Danbusky
Lloyd Harbor School	Intermediate School	7 School Lane Huntington, NY 11743	2-6	Carissa Shanahan
West Side School	Intermediate School	1597 Laurel Hollow Road Syosset, NY 11791	2-6	Dr. John Barnes
Goosehill Primary School	Elementary School	75 Goose Hill Road Cold Spring Harbor, NY 11724	K-1	Christina Cosme
