= Howard Weizmann =

American businessman and politician

Howard Weizmann was deputy director of the United States Office of Personnel Management. During his tenure, he led efforts to reform the Federal hiring process and worked to help modernize the Federal pension system. He also was responsible for the oversight of the Combined Federal Campaign (CFC) which manages the annual charitable contributions process for the Federal government. Previous to his appointment, Weizmann served as president of the Private Sector Council (PSC), part of the Partnership for Public Service, a not-for-profit organization that pairs private sector advisers with federal employees to improve agency performance management.

Previously, Weizmann served as senior vice president for European business operations and human resources for Digex, Inc. Prior to his tenure at Digex, Weizmann was the managing consultant of Watson Wyatt's (a human resource consulting firm which is today, Willis Towers Watson) Washington, Richmond and Philadelphia offices. Weizmann also served as a vice president of Aetna Life Insurance. From 1988 until 1992 Weizmann was the executive director of the American Benefits Council, a trade association which actively supports the employer-sponsored pension and health systems. Weizmann was also a lawyer and executive with Sun Company (Sunoco) during the 1980s and spent several years as an attorney in private practice..

Weizmann is the co-author of a book on employee engagement entitled, Rewards and Business Strategy: People, Pay, and Performance and is the author of numerous speeches, Congressional testimonies and articles regarding issues affecting human resources. He earned his J.D. from Georgetown University Law Center in 1977. He also has a master's degree in anthropology from the University of Michigan and was admitted to doctoral candidacy upon completion of his PhD coursework and preliminary exams.

Upon retirement, Weizmann taught human resources as an adjunct professor at the University of Maryland's University College. Subsequently, Weizmann served as a volunteer consultant on US Agency for Internal Development (USAID) funded projects in Moldova, Kenya, Mozambique, and Ethiopia. He is currently an adjunct professor of anthropology at Flagler College in St Augustine, Florida. He has been married to Jane Kathleen Tice for over 50 years and has two grown daughters and five grandchildren.
