= Harborfields Central School District =

Public school district in New York, United States

Location
- Greenlawn, Suffolk County, New York; United States

District information
- Motto: Each Child. Each Day. One Harborfields Family.
- Grades: K-12
- Established: 1956
- President: Susan Broderick
- Superintendent: Dr. Rory Manning
- Schools: 4

Students and staff
- Students: 2,767
- District mascot: Tornadoes
- Colors: Green and black

Other information
- District Offices: 2 Old Field Road Greenlawn, NY 11740
- Website: www.harborfieldscsd.net

Harborfields Central School District is a school district in the Town of Huntington in Suffolk County, New York on the North Shore of Long Island. The district serves four hamlets and one village; all of Centerport, large parts of Huntington and Greenlawn, and a small part of Northport and Huntington Station .

== History ==
=== Schools preceding the modern district ===
One of the earliest schools in the area served by today's district was the Broadway School in Greenlawn. Initially designed in 1924 and used as a school for decades, it was made into a library into the Harborfields Public Library in 1976. Another early school was the Centerport School. It was designed by James Van Alst who designed schools across Long Island. Today it is still standing as the Centerport Methodist Church.

=== Centralization of the modern district ===
The modern school district was formed in 1956 when the districts of Centerport (known many years ago as Little Cow Harbor) and Greenlawn (known historically as Oldfields) combined. The partnership of these two communities had been historically significant for many reasons, originally for farming purposes. This formation was caused due to the Huntington Union Free School District, which had previously served Centerport and Greenlawn students at Huntington High School, no longer being able to support these students. The new district opened Harborfields High School in their inaugural year. The name "Harborfields" was chosen by the first students of the new district, and comes from the original names of the two hamlets, combining the "Harbor" of Little Cow Harbor and the "fields" of Oldfields to make "Harborfields."

=== Elwood merger attempts ===
Due to the Elwood Union Free School District being very small, the district has made many efforts to merge with neighboring districts. Harborfields has always been one of the most likely partners for a merger with Elwood, due to Harborfields also being a smaller district. Elwood made efforts in 1992 for a merger, but nothing ended up coming from it. In late 2010 and early 2011, Elwood wrote to every district that borders it proposing a merger due to Elwood's extreme money issues, including Harborfields. Harborfields superintendent of the time, Frank J. Carasiti, had been a key figure in education of Long Island for decades and has an elementary school in the Rocky Point Union Free School District named after him. He turned it down, citing his past experience with merger efforts as Rocky Point superintendent.

== Schools ==
The following is a table of the schools in the Harborfields Central School District.

School name	Type of school	Address	Grades	Principal
Harborfields High School	High School	98 Taylor Avenue Greenlawn, NY 11740	9-12	Dr. Phillip Farrelly
Oldfield Middle School	Middle School	2 Old Field Road Greenlawn, NY 11740	6-8	Maribeth Corr
Thomas J. Lahey Elementary School	Intermediate School	625 Pulaski Road Greenlawn, NY 11740	3-5	Jennifer Washington
Washington Drive Primary School	Primary School	95 Washington Drive Centerport, NY 11721	K-2	Kathryn McNally
