= Elwood-John H. Glenn High School =

Location
- 478 Elwood Road; Elwood, New York 11731; United States; 40°51′19″N 73°20′09″W

Information
- Type: Public
- Established: 1962
- School district: Elwood Union Free School District
- Principal: Irene McLaughlin
- Teaching staff: 58.91 (FTE)
- Grades: 9-12
- Enrollment: 676 (2023-2024)
- Student to teacher ratio: 11.48
- Colors: Royal Blue, White and Black
- Athletics conference: [Section XI]
- Nickname: Elwood Knights
- Newspaper: The Knight Times
- Website: John H. Glenn High School

Elwood-John H. Glenn High School (often shortened to simply John Glenn High School) is a four-year high school of about 700 students and 70 faculty members, located in the hamlet of Elwood, Town of Huntington, Long Island, New York. The school serves residents of the Elwood School District.

== History ==
The school was constructed from a combined authorization for building, equipment, grounds and landscaping of $3,640,000, and came in under budget. The architect was Frederick E. Allardt, A.I.A. The school was dedicated on November 17, 1962, after opening to students in September 1962, with Williard J. Adams, President of the Board of Education and James H. Boyd, District Principal laying the cornerstone and Dr. Walter Crewson, Associate Commissioner of Education for the State of New York giving the address: "Education for Freedom.". The first principal was Dr. Jack Horner. The school is named after NASA astronaut John Glenn, whose historic flight as the first American to orbit Earth took place on February 20, 1962, during the construction of the school. The School Board and High School P.T.A. led by Mary Birkel decided on the name. Its first senior class of 72 students graduated in June 1963.

The school quickly became known for both its high percentage of students entering college as well as for having a superior sports program, participating as the Elwood Knights in the Suffolk County League B IV.

== Athletics ==
The school has had numerous athletes named as All county and All State in baseball, basketball, football, gymnastics, soccer, volleyball and wrestling. The 1964 baseball team as a B-1 school defeated North Babylon (AA-1)in the playoffs and then Half Hallows Hills in the championship game to win the Suffolk County title and its varsity football team was undefeated (8–0) that same year, only the second year the school fielded a varsity team. Coach Jim Dunn was named 1965 Suffolk Coach of the Year. In 1989, both the baseball and softball teams won the Suffolk County Class B Championship.

In basketball, Glenn's boys team won the Long Island and Suffolk County Class A championships in 2014, the Class B Championship in 1987 and 1988 as well as the Long Island Class B Championship in 1988. The girls team won the Suffolk County Class B Championship in 2005, the Suffolk County Class A Championship in 2006 and 2011, the Long Island Class B Championship in 2005, the Long Island Class A Championship in 2006 and the New York State Class B Championship in 2005.

Football has remained a successful program at the high school. James Dunn was the coach during the program's first period, guiding the undefeated 1964 team and was named Suffolk County Coach of the Year by Newsday. Dr. Bob Cox took the helm in 1971 coaching the Blue Knights to their first ever conference title in 1972. Tony Cerullo followed continuing the trend, winning conference titles in 1975–77, 1979 and 1984, with a Rutgers Trophy in 1979 to his credit, when he was named Suffolk County Coach of the Year, as well for the best football team in the county. In 2010, the football team won the Suffolk County Championship and its first Long Island Championship. The team was also awarded the Rutgers Trophy for the second time. The 2010 Knights Football team was the only undefeated public high school football team in the 2010 season as they beat Seaford High School in the championship game. In 2011, the football team won its second straight Long Island Class IV Championship by defeating Roosevelt High School.

The boys soccer team was dominant in the 1980s and 1990s, winning the Suffolk County Class B Championship in 1985, 1986, 1987, 1988, 1990, 1991 and 1992, the Long Island Class B Championship in 1986, 1987 and 1990, and the New York State Class B Championship in 1986, 1987 and 1990.Also winning the class A league championship in 2024, and 2025 and the long island championship in 2024 and 2025 as well. The girls soccer team won the Suffolk County Class B Championship in 1995 and the Long Island Class B Championship in 1984.

The John Glenn girls' volleyball team has achieved outstanding success over the past 2 decades. The Spiders (as they call themselves) have been League Champions for 20 years straight, Suffolk County Class B Champions for 13 years straight also capturing two other county titles for a total of 15. They also have been crowned Long Island Class B Champions for the past 12 years straight sending them onto the State Championships where they took State Class B titles 6 out of the last 10 years. (2003, 2004, 2005, 2007, 2011, and 2012). The controversy over whether the Glenn Girls' volleyball program should be entitled to call themselves the "Spiders" rather than the "Lady Knights" is part of what makes the athletic program at John Glenn unique.

Glenn's wrestling team, started by coach Richard Coronato in 1962, was League IV Champions in 1965, 1966, 2001, 2007, 2008, 2009 and 2013, the Suffolk County Division II champion in 2007 and Suffolk County Division I champion in 2009 and 2010. Also, League IV Tournament Champions in 2000–01, 2001–02, 2008–09, 2015–16.

== Achievements ==
Each year, members of the senior class achieve SAT scores that rank above the national and state averages. Its students have performed as All-County, All-State and All-Eastern musicians. Many of the school's art students participate in and receive recognition at regional competitions and one student was recognized for his work, at the state level. The number of seniors cited by the National Merit Scholarship Program exceeds the national average. Graduating classes have included a number of National Merit Scholarship finalists, semifinalists, and commended scholars. In addition, 87 percent of the class of 2003 graduated with a New York State Regents diploma, one of the highest percentages on Long Island. Ninety percent of the graduating class continued their education, attending colleges, universities, and technical schools. Courses are reviewed annually, and new courses are added to meet changing needs. Included are Advanced Placement and college-level courses, Regents courses that meet and exceed all state requirements, and electives in both academic and technical areas.

John Glenn was ranked 211th and 277th in Newsweek's list of the top 1,000 high schools in 2003 and 2005, respectively. In 2010, it dropped to 816, but was ranked 318th in 2012, and returned to 277th in 2013, then went down to 376th in 2015.

In 2016, Elwood-John H. Glenn High School was ranked 2nd out of 95 school districts on Long Island in terms of Advanced Placement exam scores. The College Board reported that 86 percent of students at the school who took the exams scored at least a 3 out of 5.

In 2018, Elwood-John Glenn High School was named a National Blue Ribbon School by the U.S. Department of Education, one of only four schools on Long Island to receive this award.

== Notable alumni ==
- Peter Catalanotto (born 1959, class of 1977) – Author/Illustrator of over 40 books for children.
- Anthony Cumia (born 1961, class of 1979 but did not graduate) – co-host of the Sirius XM Satellite Radio program The Opie and Anthony Show (until his firing in July 2014.) and host of The Anthony Cumia Show on Compound Media.
- Devon Hughes (born 1972) – professional wrestler, WWE Hall of Fame class of 2018, member of The Dudley Boyz.
- Sal Iacono (born 1971, class of 1989) – cousin of Jimmy Kimmel. Show Host of “Against All Odds” on FS1
- Ashley Massaro (1979–2019) - former WWE professional wrestler, Playboy model, and television actress.
- Paul Steven Miller (1961–2010, class of 1979) – Commissioner, US Equal Employment Opportunity Commission (1994–2004), Henry M. Jackson Professor of Law at the University of Washington School of Law (2004–2010), Special Assistant to President Obama (2009).
- Ifeanyi Momah (born 1989, class of 2007) – former NFL football tight end who played for the Philadelphia Eagles, Cleveland Browns, Detroit Lions and Arizona Cardinals as well as in college for the Boston College Eagles.
- David Spergel (born 1961, class of 1978) – theoretical astrophysicist and MacArthur Fellow; presently a professor at Princeton University known for his work on the WMAP mission and chair of the Astrophysics Subcommittee of the NASA Advisory Council.
