= Rocky Point Union Free School District =

Public school district in New York, United States

Location
- Rocky Point, Suffolk County, New York; United States

District information
- Grades: K-12
- Established: 1928
- President: Jessica Ward
- Superintendent: Dr. Scott O'Brien
- Schools: 4

Students and staff
- Students: 2,662
- Student–teacher ratio: 11.44 to 1
- District mascot: Eagles
- Colors: Blue and white

Other information
- District Offices: 90 Rocky Point - Yaphank Road Rocky Point, NY 11778
- Website: www.rockypointufsd.org

Rocky Point Union Free School District is a school district in the Town of Brookhaven in Suffolk County on the North Shore of Long Island, New York. The district serves almost all of Rocky Point, a large portion of Sound Beach, and a tiny pocket of Ridge.

== History ==
=== Overall district history ===
The first ever Rocky Point school was opened in 1812, and 30 years later in 1842 the first predecessor of the modern district was established as school district #9 of Brookhaven Town. In 1928, the first school used today by the district was opened. Then the Rocky Point School, it was later renamed to the Joseph A. Edgar Intermediate School, named for its first principal. Frank J. Carasiti Elementary School was opened in 1975, originally called Rocky Point Elementary School. Around the turn of the 21st century, Rocky Point Middle School was opened. Today's Rocky Point High School was originally Rocky Point Junior-Senior High School, and opened in 1971 after being under construction for ten years.

=== Frank J. Carasiti ===
Frank J. Carasiti was one of the most influential people in the history of Rocky Point schools. After starting as a 6th grade teacher in 1957, he became the interim superintendent of the district in 1963. He would later become the long term superintendent, and held the position until 1990 when he retired from Rocky Point. He would also go on to be the superintendent at Harborfields. Carasiti passed away in 2011 at the age of 78, following an almost 50 year career in education on Long Island. During his time as Rocky Point superintendent, he saw over the opening of Rocky Point Elementary and Rocky Point Junior-Senior High School, known today as Frank J. Carasiti Elementary and Rocky Point High School.

== Schools ==
The following is a table of all the schools in the Rocky Point Union Free School District.

School name	Type Of School	Address	Grades	Principal
Rocky Point High School	High School	82 Rocky Point – Yaphank Road Rocky Point, NY 11778	9-12	James Moeller
Rocky Point Middle School	Middle School	76 Rocky Point – Yaphank Road Rocky Point, NY 11778	6-8	Dawn Meyers
Joseph A. Edgar Intermediate School	Intermediate School	525 Route 25A Rocky Point, NY 11778	3-5	Nicole Pletka
Frank J. Carasiti Elementary School	Elementary School	90 Rocky Point – Yaphank Road Rocky Point, NY 11778	K-2	Jason Westerlund
