= Elwood, New York =

- Hamlet and census-designated place
- Motto: "The Heart of Huntington"
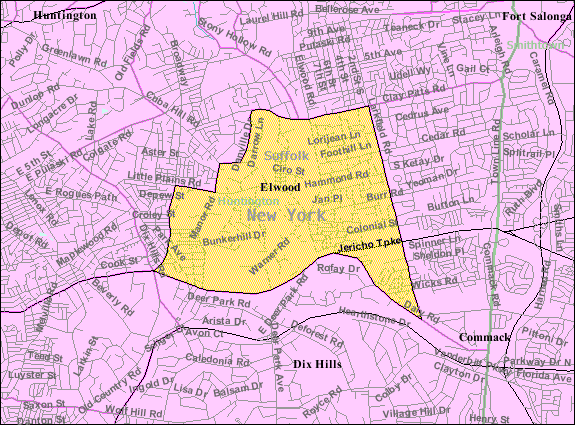
- U.S. Census map of Elwood

- Location on Long Island and within the state of New York Elwood, New York (New York)
- Coordinates: 40°50′44″N 73°20′7″W
- Country: United States
- State: New York
- County: Suffolk
- Town: Huntington

Area
  - Total: 4.78 sq mi (12.38 km^{2})
  - Land: 4.78 sq mi (12.38 km^{2})
  - Water: 0 sq mi (0.00 km^{2})
- Elevation: 184 ft (56 m)

Population (2020)
  - Total: 11,426
  - Density: 2,390.1/sq mi (922.84/km^{2})
- Time zone: UTC-5 (Eastern (EST))
  - Summer (DST): UTC-4 (EDT)
- ZIP code: 11730, 11731, 11743
- Area codes: 631, 934
- FIPS code: 36-24405
- GNIS feature ID: 0949620

Elwood is a census-designated place (CDP) in the Town of Huntington in Suffolk County, on Long Island, in New York, United States. The population was 11,426 as of the 2020 census.

The hamlet, given its location in the center of the Town of Huntington, is referred to as "The Heart of Huntington."

== History ==
Elwood historically had its own post office and was originally known as Northern Dix Hills. How it got the name Elwood is somewhat of a mystery. The first settlers came to Elwood, NY, in the mid to late 1800s. A post office was established in North Dix Hills (the area north of Jericho Turnpike) on June 7, 1870, officially operating under the name Elwood. There was also a book published in 1874 about Suffolk County, New York. In that book it makes the first mention of the name Elwood, stating that "Elwood was described as a one-and-a-half-mile area southeast of a section called Cuba." By 1871, the original Dix Hills Post Office was discontinued, and all mail was transferred there. This historic, 19th-century Elwood Post Office was permanently discontinued on October 31, 1902.

There are graves for revolutionary soldiers and their families, so it is believed that they've been here since before the mid-1800s.

There were large farmlands owned by a few farmers. Many people who were farmers came to Elwood to work, grow, and produce food because of the level land and Long Island's rich soil. Elwood may have gotten its name from an early settler named Elkanah Wood; however, this is only a theory. As the Elwood community started to grow, there were few students in the schools due to families deciding that farm life and chores came before education. The need for education became more apparent with families wanting their children to go to school. In 1894 a law in New York State was passed so that every child from 8 to 16 was required to attend school.

== Geography and public service ==
According to the United States Census Bureau, the CDP has a total area of 4.8 square miles (12 km^{2}), all land.

Since Elwood's post office closed. Elwood uses either the East Northport postal service 11731, the Huntington postal service 11743 and the Greenlawn postal service or the 11730. The East Northport post office still considers Elwood as an acceptable mailing alternative

Elwood is served by the Greenlawn Fire Department to the west, the East Northport Fire Department to the northwest, and Commack to the South East.

== Demographics ==
Historical population
| Census | Pop. | Note | %± |
|---|---|---|---|
| 2020 | 11,426 | | — |
U.S. Decennial Census

=== 2020 census ===
As of the 2020 census, Elwood had a population of 11,426. The median age was 44.8 years. 20.2% of residents were under the age of 18 and 19.7% of residents were 65 years of age or older. For every 100 females there were 94.9 males, and for every 100 females age 18 and over there were 93.5 males age 18 and over.

100.0% of residents lived in urban areas, while 0.0% lived in rural areas.

There were 3,730 households in Elwood, of which 34.6% had children under the age of 18 living in them. Of all households, 66.8% were married-couple households, 10.2% were households with a male householder and no spouse or partner present, and 19.4% were households with a female householder and no spouse or partner present. About 13.9% of all households were made up of individuals and 8.7% had someone living alone who was 65 years of age or older.

There were 3,846 housing units, of which 3.0% were vacant. The homeowner vacancy rate was 0.9% and the rental vacancy rate was 2.2%.

Racial composition as of the 2020 census
| Race | Number | Percent |
|---|---|---|
| White | 8,485 | 74.3% |
| Hispanic or Latino (of any race) | 1,387 | 12.1% |
| Asian | 948 | 8.3% |
| Two or more races | 867 | 7.6% |
| Black or African American | 559 | 4.9% |
| Some other race | 554 | 4.8% |
| American Indian and Alaska Native | 13 | 0.1% |
| Native Hawaiian and Other Pacific Islander | 0 | 0.0% |

=== Demographic estimates ===
According to U.S. Census Bureau QuickFacts, 5.2% of residents were under age five and 50.3% of residents were female.

=== Housing and socioeconomic data ===
Housing in Elwood was predominantly owner-occupied (97.7%). The median value of owner-occupied housing units was $574,000, and median gross rent was $1,417.

Among residents age 25 and older, 95.6% were high school graduates or higher and 47.7% held a bachelor's degree or higher. The civilian labor force participation rate was 67.4%, median household income was $150,549, and mean travel time to work was 43.1 minutes.

== Education ==
The hamlet is primarily located within the boundaries of (and is thus served by) the Elwood Union Free School District. However, a small section of the hamlet's southwestern extreme is located within the boundaries of (and is thus served by) the South Huntington Union Free School District. As such, children who reside within the hamlet and attend public schools go to school in one of these two districts, depending on where they reside within the hamlet.

== Transportation ==
Major roads in Elwood include Jericho Turnpike (New York State Route 25), Burr Road, Clay Pitts Road, Cuba Hill Road, Daly Road, Elwood Road, Little Plains Road, and Park Avenue.

== Notable people ==
- Anthony Cumia (born 1961), radio show host of Opie and Anthony
