= Huntington High School (New York) =

- Facade of the school building, photographed in August 2012.

Location
- 188 Oakwood Road; Huntington, New York 11743; United States; 40°51′24″N 73°25′28″W

Information
- Other name: HHS
- Type: Public high school
- Established: 1958
- School district: Huntington Union Free School District
- NCES School ID: 361509001263
- Principal: Rochelle C. Brown
- Teaching staff: 121.80 (on an FTE basis)
- Grades: 9–12
- Enrollment: 1,363 (2024–2025)
- Student to teacher ratio: 11.19
- Colors: Blue and White
- Mascot: Blue Devil
- Nickname: Blue Devils
- Newspaper: The Dispatch
- Yearbook: Huntingtonian
- Website: www.hufsd.edu/schools/hhs.html

Huntington High School (HHS) is a public high school in Huntington, New York, United States. It is part of the Huntington Union Free School District.

== Controversy ==
In 2018, Huntington High School was at the center of a controversy surrounding the deportation of a Honduran student seeking asylum. Documented in the New York Times, Alex was wrongly accused by Huntington High School of being part of a gang. "Despite all these warning signs, when the ICE agents came to Alex's house on June 14, 2017, he was shocked into silence. It was only when they were far from Huntington, passing through unfamiliar, rundown Long Island towns, that he was able to get out the words to ask why he was being arrested. Alex says the agent first asked him to guess, and then told him, 'We received a report a while ago from the school that you were a gang member, and that's why.'"

== Notable alumni ==
- Anthony Brown (1979), lawyer, politician and congressman
- James D. Conte, politician
- Dawn Dunlop, United States Air Force Major General
- Brian Goldner (1981), CEO of Hasbro
- Leroy Grumman (1911), aeronautical engineer, test pilot, and industrialist
- Joseph Hazelwood (1964), sailor
- Amy Ignatow (1995), author, illustrator, and cartoonist
- Ilana Kurshan, author
- Greg Packer (1983), perpetual man-on-the-street interviewee
- Sarah Reinertsen, paratriathlete and former Paralympic track athlete
- Kurt Sohn (1975), NFL player
