= Times Union (Albany, New York) =

American daily newspaper in New York State

- Since 1856; The information source for the Capital Region.

- Type: Daily newspaper
- Format: Broadsheet
- Owner: Hearst Communications
- Publisher: George Randolph Hearst III
- Editor: Casey Seiler
- Founded: 1856 (as Morning Times)
- Headquarters: 645 Albany Shaker Road; Colonie, NY; United States
- Circulation: 66,835 Daily; 128,565 Sunday (as of 2011)
- ISSN: 8756-5927
- Website: timesunion.com

The Times Union, or Times-Union, is an American daily newspaper, serving the Capital Region of New York. Although the newspaper focuses on Albany and its suburbs, it covers all parts of the four-county area, including the cities of Troy, Schenectady and Saratoga Springs. In 2021, the paper also expanded to covering the Hudson Valley. It is owned by Hearst Communications. The paper was founded in 1856 as the Morning Times, becoming Times-Union by 1891, and was purchased by William Randolph Hearst in 1924. The sister paper Knickerbocker News merged with the Times Union in 1988. The newspaper has been online since 1996.

The editor of the Times Union is Casey Seiler, who has held the post since Feb. 1, 2020. He previously served as the paper's managing editor. George Hearst is the publisher.

The newspaper is printed in its Colonie headquarters by the Hearst Corporation's Capital Newspapers Division. The daily edition costs $2 and the Sunday/Thanksgiving Day edition costs $3. Home delivery prices are slightly lower.

The Times Union announced in May 2006 that it would pay $3.5 million over 10 years for the naming rights of the Pepsi Arena in downtown Albany. On January 1, 2007, the arena was renamed the Times Union Center. On January 1, 2022 the venue was renamed the MVP Arena.

== Sections ==
=== Daily ===
- Front Section: The Times Union's A section contains national, world, state, and celebrity news, corrections, editorials, an editorial cartoon, commentaries, and letters to the editor. In 2007, the paper reorganized its daily sections and began placing late-breaking local news stories in the front section.
- Capital Region: The local section contains news relating to the Capital District, obituaries, a calendar of events, and the weather report. It also contains columns by Fred LeBrun, Paul Grondahl and Chris Churchill.
- Sports: The sports section covers local and national sports events at high school, college, and professional levels. Outdoor activities are also represented.
- Business: The business section contains local and national business news, stock and mutual fund tables, classified advertisements, and a crossword puzzle.
- Perspective: The Perspective section includes editorials, columns and letters to the editor.

=== Thursday ===
In addition to the above, the Thursday edition contains:

- Preview: A tabloid section covering movies, music, dance, theater, and other entertainment topics. It contains movie reviews in brief, a calendar of events, personals, and a review of an inexpensive restaurant.

=== Sunday ===
In addition to the daily sections, the Sunday edition contains:

- Perspective: Contains opinion commentaries, editorials, an editorial cartoon, columns, letters to the editor, and notable quotes of the week.
- Spaces: A tabloid section with real estate listings and articles on housing topics.
- Travel/Books: A two-part section with the first portion covering travel and the second covering books. It contains travel articles, weekly airfares, book reviews, and the New York Times Bestseller List.
- Parade Magazine: The Sunday Times Union includes this national magazine covering lifestyle (food, health, fitness, family) and celebrity topics.
- Arts/Events: The arts section has articles on classical music, the visual arts, and theater. It also contains a calendar of events, museum and gallery listings, and a Broadway theater directory.

The Sunday paper also has numerous advertising circulars and coupon pages.

== Editorial board ==
The Times Union's editorial board consists of:

- George R. Hearst III, publisher
- Casey Seiler, editor
- Akum Norder, senior editor for opinion
- Jay Jochnowitz, editor at large
- Tena Tyler, senior editor for engagement
- Chris Churchill, editorial writer and metro columnist

== See also ==
- Alan Chartock
- Lawrence C. Levy
- The Media Project
- Times Union Center
- WAMC
