= WIPS =

WIPS may refer to:

- WIPS (AM), a radio station (1250 AM) formerly licensed to Ticonderoga, New York, United States
- Wireless intrusion prevention system, a network device that monitors the radio spectrum for the presence of unauthorized access points
- Workforce Integrated Performance System
