= Ira Fusfeld =

Ira Fusfeld (born July 20, 1948) is publisher emeritus of the Daily and Sunday Freeman, Kingston, New York. He was publisher from 1987 to 2012. He began his daily newspaper career at the Freeman in 1970 as a sports writer. On his way to becoming publisher, he was sports editor, editor and general manager of the Freeman. Fusfeld also was publisher of Las Noticias, the Freeman's Spanish language weekly. He was named Publisher of the Year for 2001 by Journal Register Company.

A New York City native, Ira is a graduate of the State University of New York at New Paltz. He has been a member of numerous civic and professional organizations, among them the New York Newspaper Publishers Association, of which he served as chairman of the board of directors and chairman of its legislative committee, and is a member of its foundation. He served on the boards of Ulster County Economic Development Corp., the Management Council of the Hudson Valley Economic Development Corp., and Mid-Hudson Pattern for Progress. In addition he has been a member of the College Council at SUNY New Paltz and the Communications Advisory Council of Ulster County Community College. He is a past trustee of the SUNY New Paltz Foundation, of which he was chairman. He has been a vice chairman of the Chamber of Commerce of Ulster County and a member of the board of the United Way of Ulster County.

He is a regular panelist on The Media Project, a weekly program on the media that airs on the WAMC Northeast Public Radio Network and on various affiliate stations throughout the nation.

== Sources ==
- https://web.archive.org/web/20071219005009/http://www.journalregister.com/press/01172002.html
- https://web.archive.org/web/20080221141355/http://www.wamc.org/prog-media.html
- https://web.archive.org/web/20070523050950/http://www.midhudsoncentral.com/site/news.cfm?brd=1769&nav_sec=13545&nr=1&nostat=1

(dead link...site formerly run by the Taconic Press chain of which Fusfeld was occasionally publisher during its ownership by Journal Register—after they were shuttered in JRC's 2009 bankruptcy rights to the Taconic papers were sold to Roger Ailes and his family but the Putnam County Courier was the only one revived, while the domain now forwards to dailyfreeman.com's not-found message)

- http://www.dailyfreeman.com/articles/2012/07/03/news/doc4ff2e85728a72170986670.txt
