= Huntington, New York =

Town on Long Island, New York

- Town
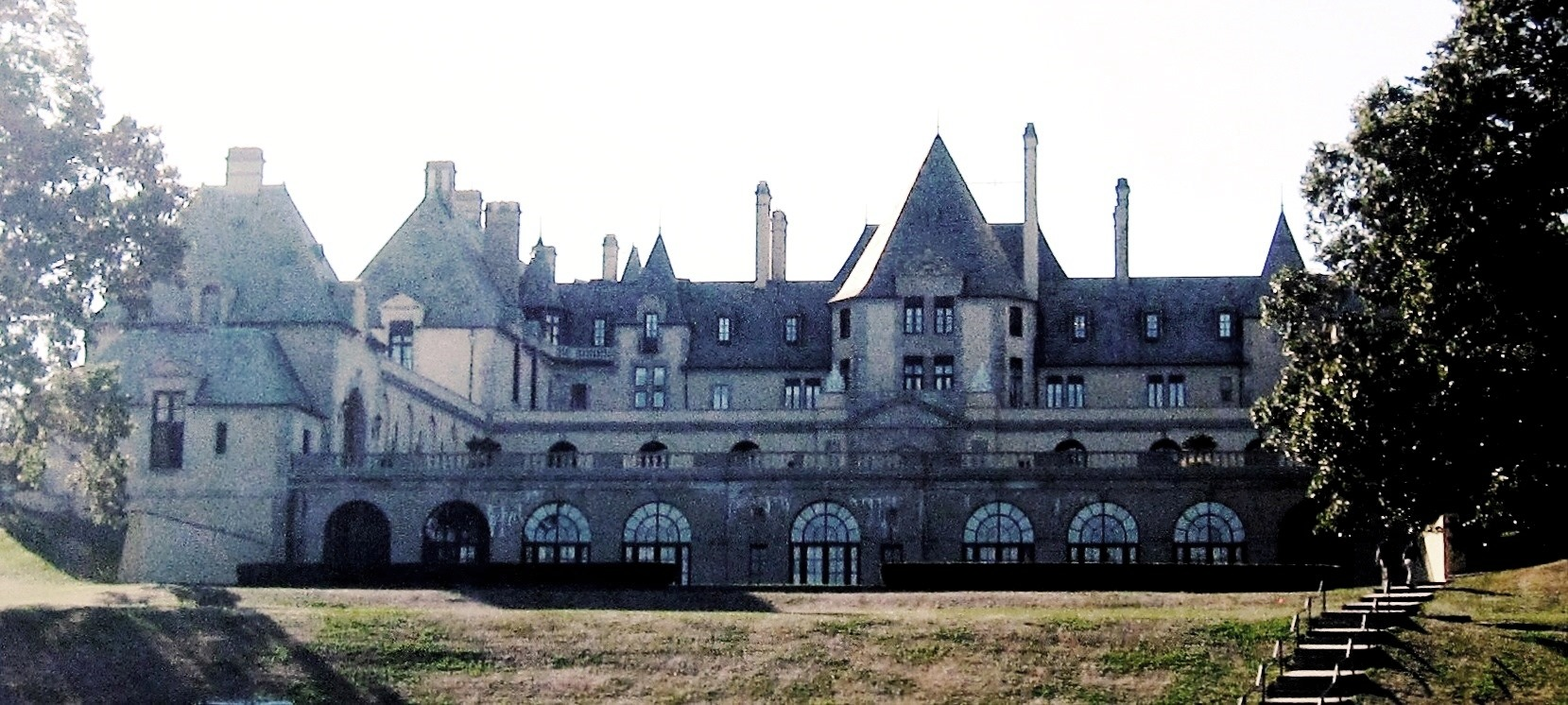
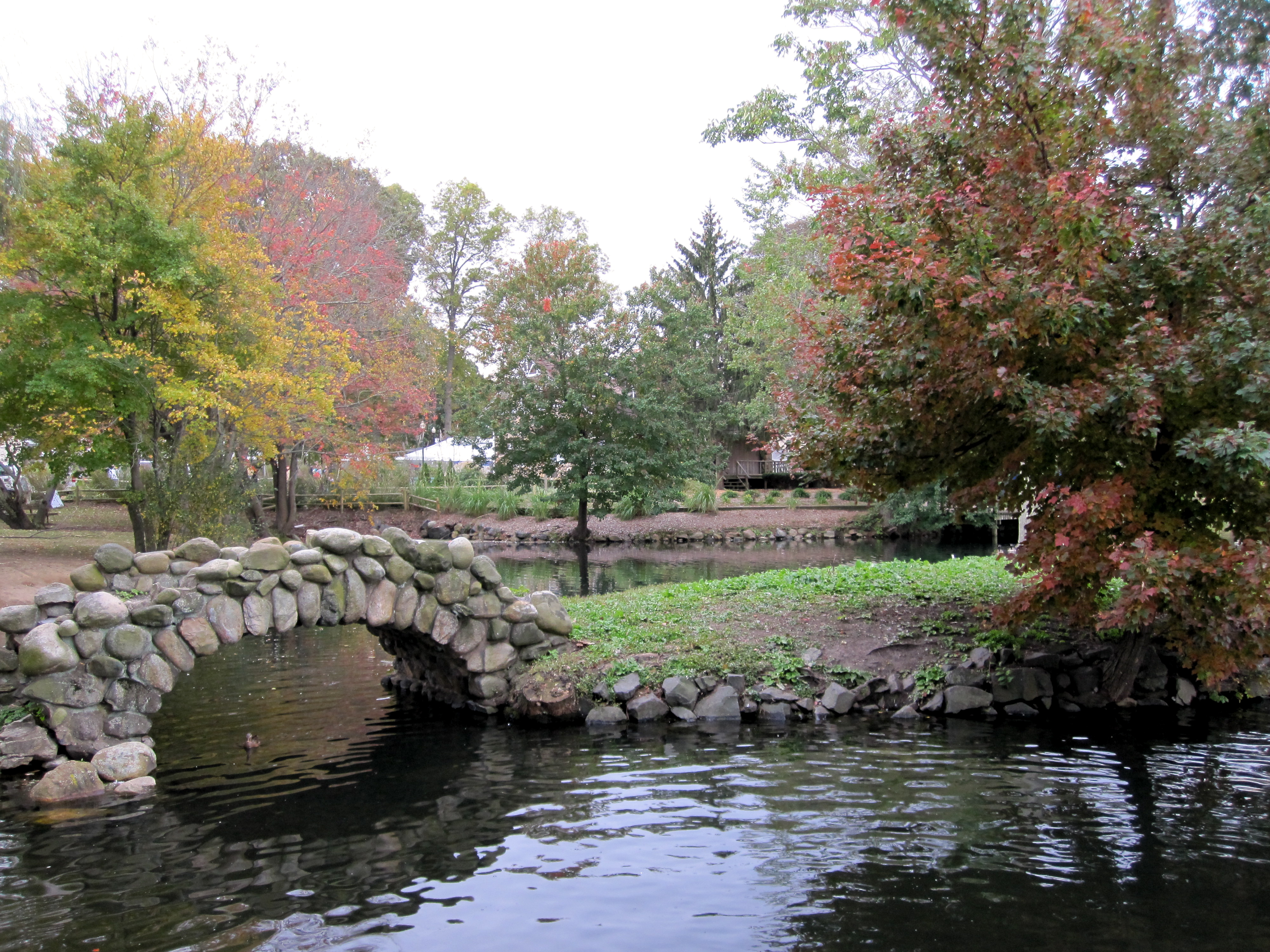
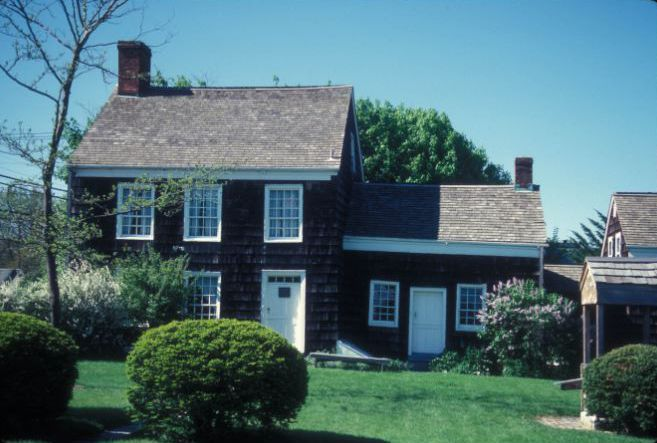
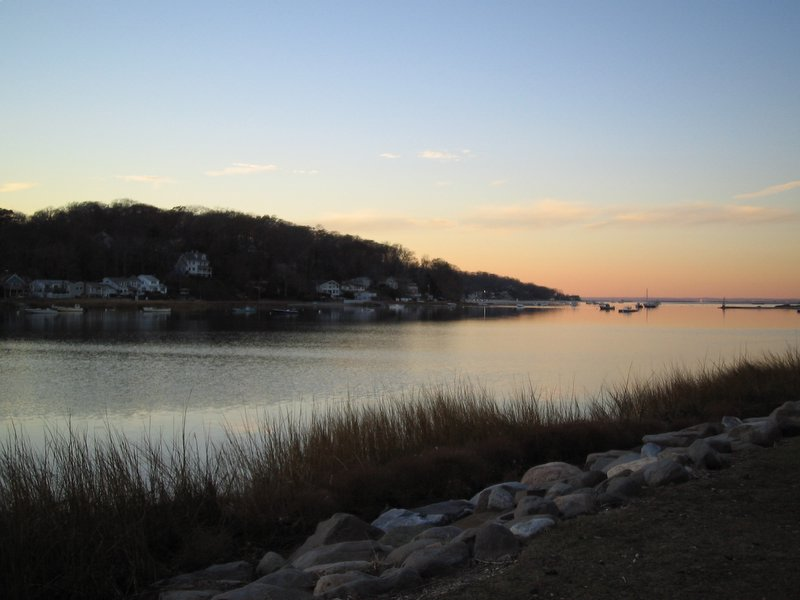
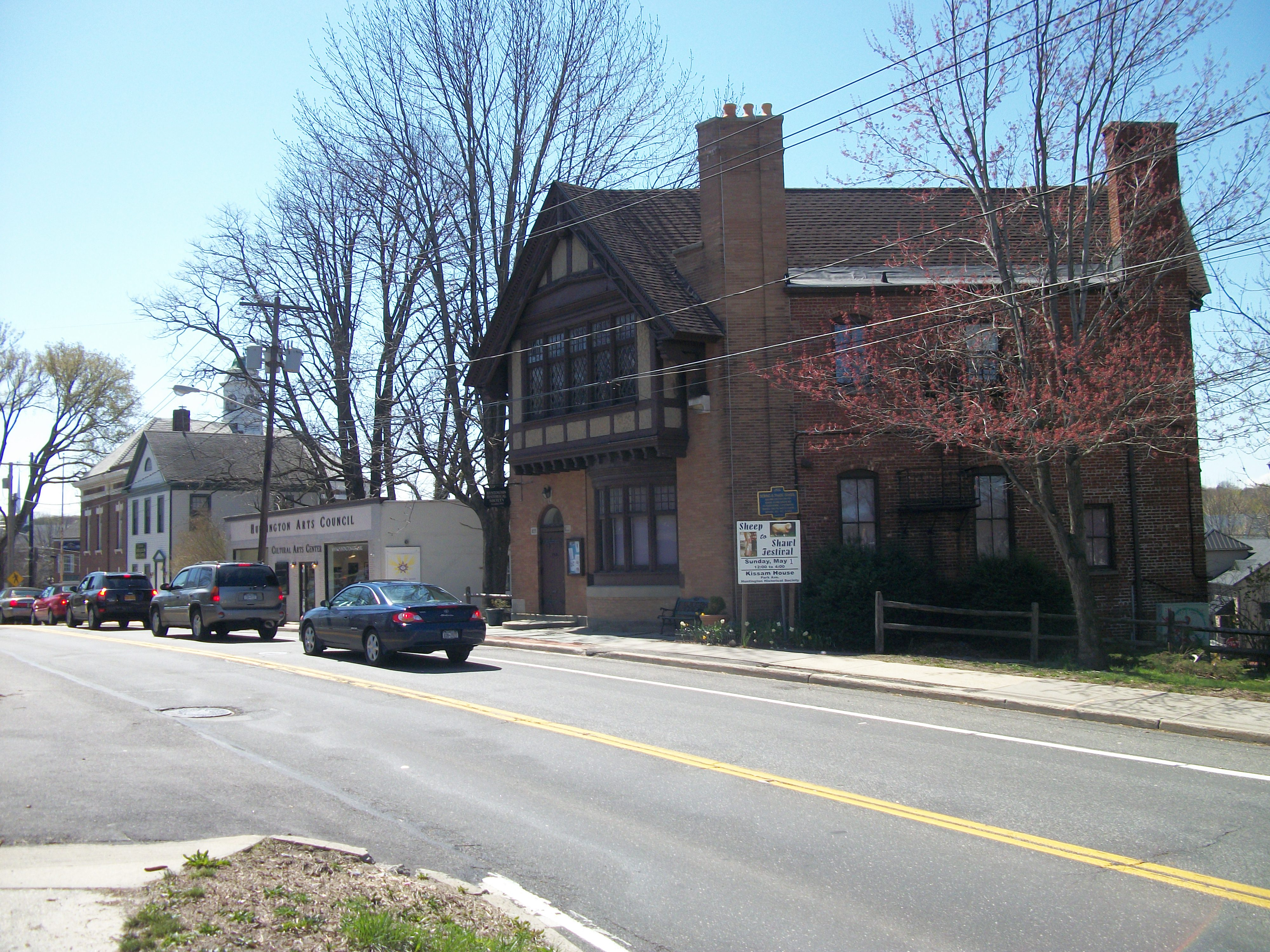
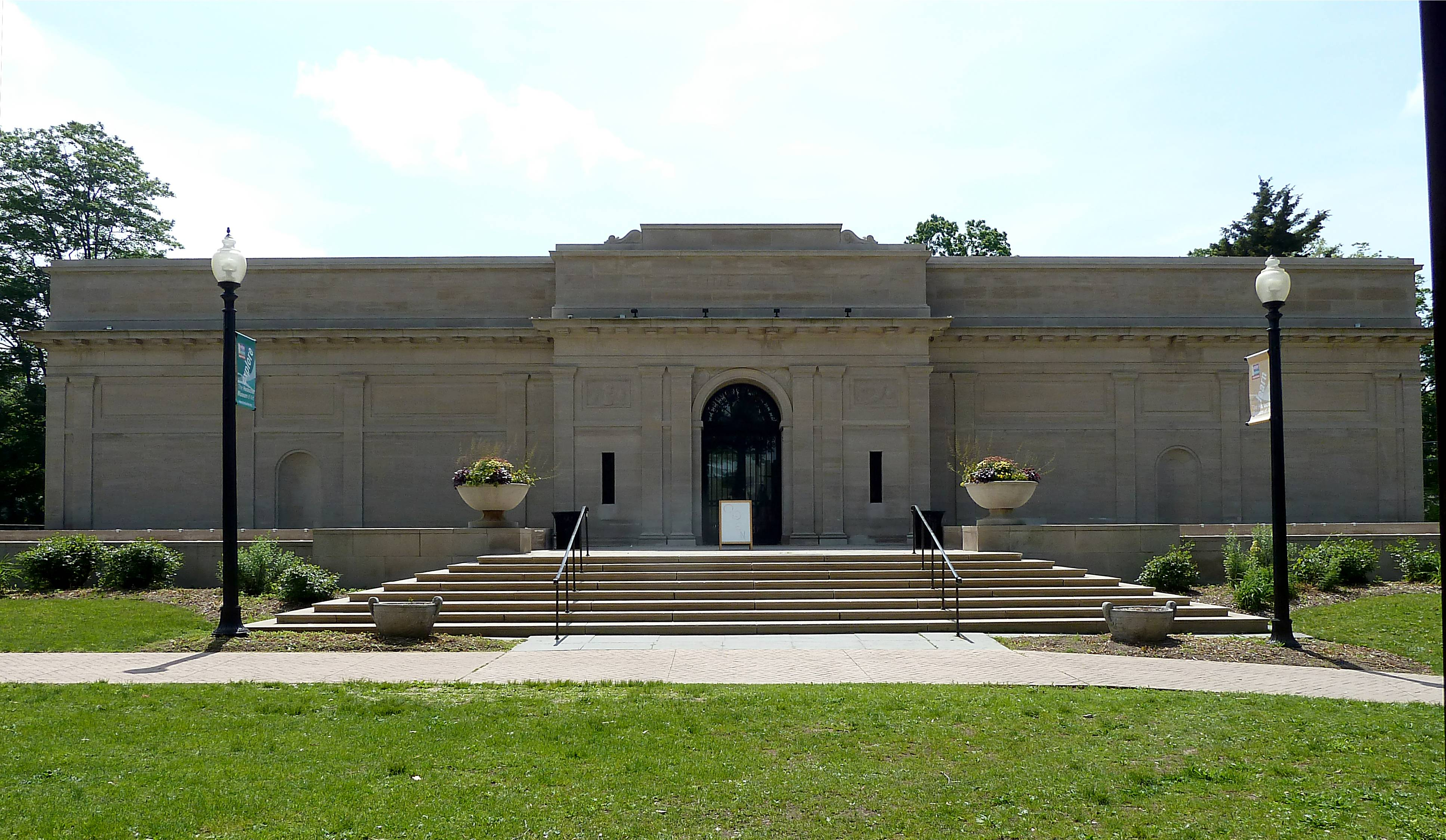
- Oheka Castle, Heckscher Park, Walt Whitman's Birthplace, sunset at Centerport Harbor, the historic former Huntington Sewing and Trade School, and the Heckscher Museum of Art

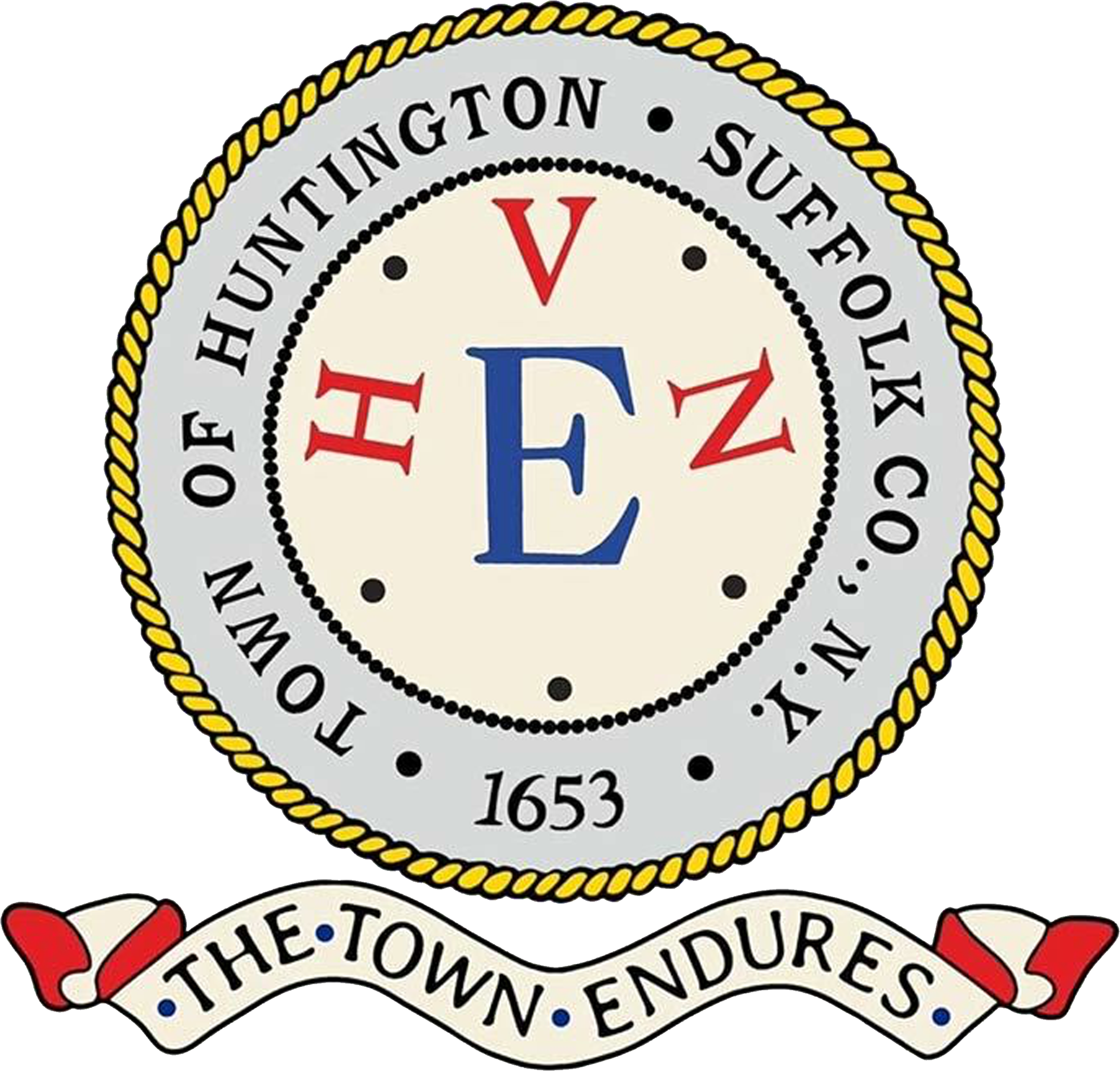
- Flag Seal
- Interactive map of Huntington, New York
- Coordinates: 40°51′36″N 73°21′8″W
- Country: United States
- State: New York
- County: Suffolk
- Town Seat: Huntington

Government
  - Town Supervisor: Edmund Smyth (R)

Area
  - Total: 137.1 sq mi (355 km^{2})
  - Land: 94.0 sq mi (243 km^{2})
  - Water: 43.1 sq mi (112 km^{2})
- Elevation: 135 ft (41 m)

Population (2020)
  - Total: 204,127
  - Density: 2,162/sq mi (835/km^{2})
- Time zone: UTC−5 (EST)
  - Summer (DST): UTC−4 (EDT)
- ZIP Codes: 11721, 11724, 11731, 11740, 11743, 11746, 11747, 11750, 11768
- Area codes: 631, 934
- FIPS code: 36-68000
- GNIS feature ID: 0979498
- Website: huntingtonny.gov

Huntington is a town in Suffolk County, New York, United States. The town's population was 204,127 at the time of the 2020 census, making it the 11th most populous town in the state.

Founded in 1653, the Town of Huntington is located on the North Shore of Long Island in northwestern Suffolk County, with the Long Island Sound to its north and Nassau County adjacent to the west. It is part of the New York metropolitan area.

== History ==
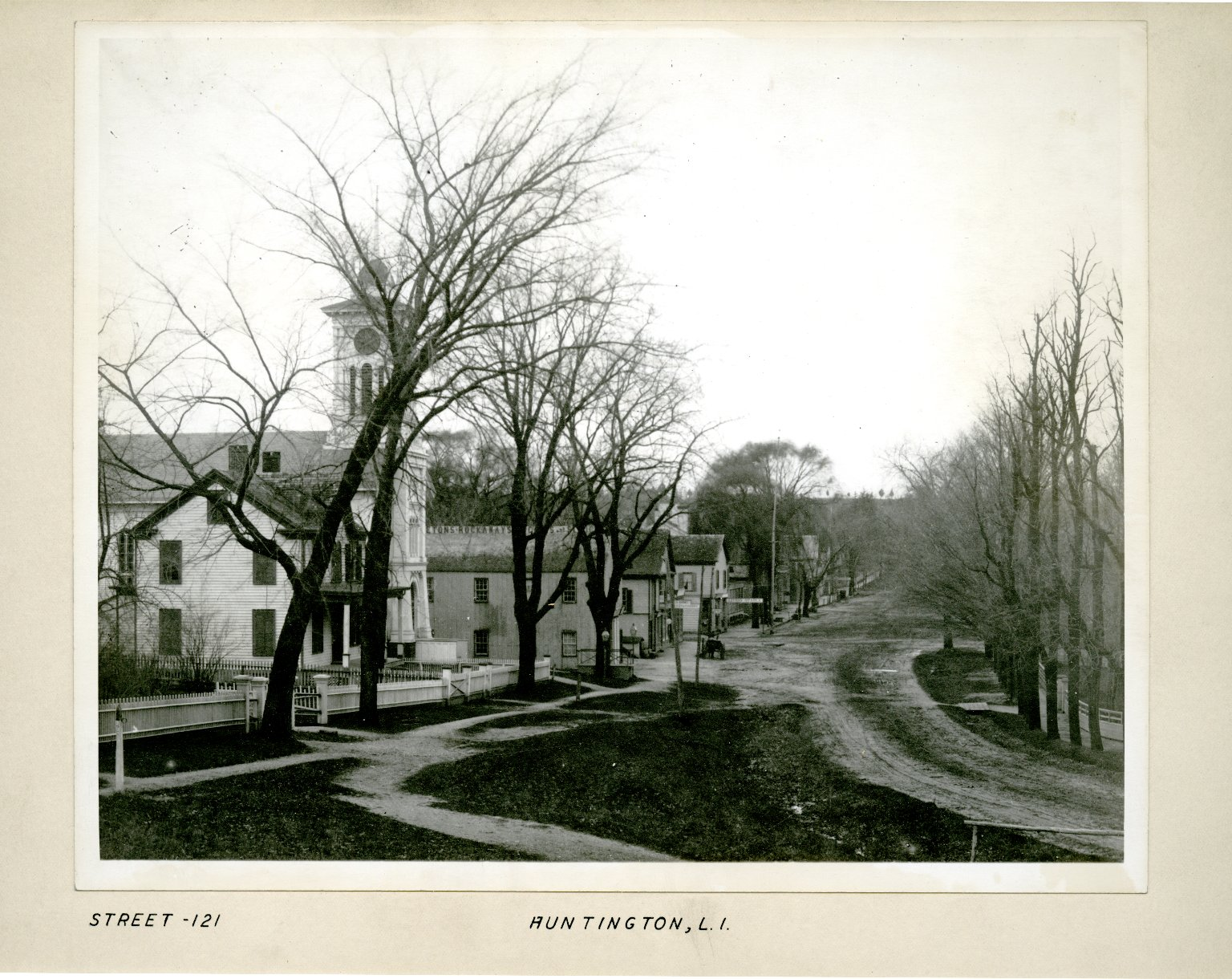
George Bradford Brainerd Street, 1907

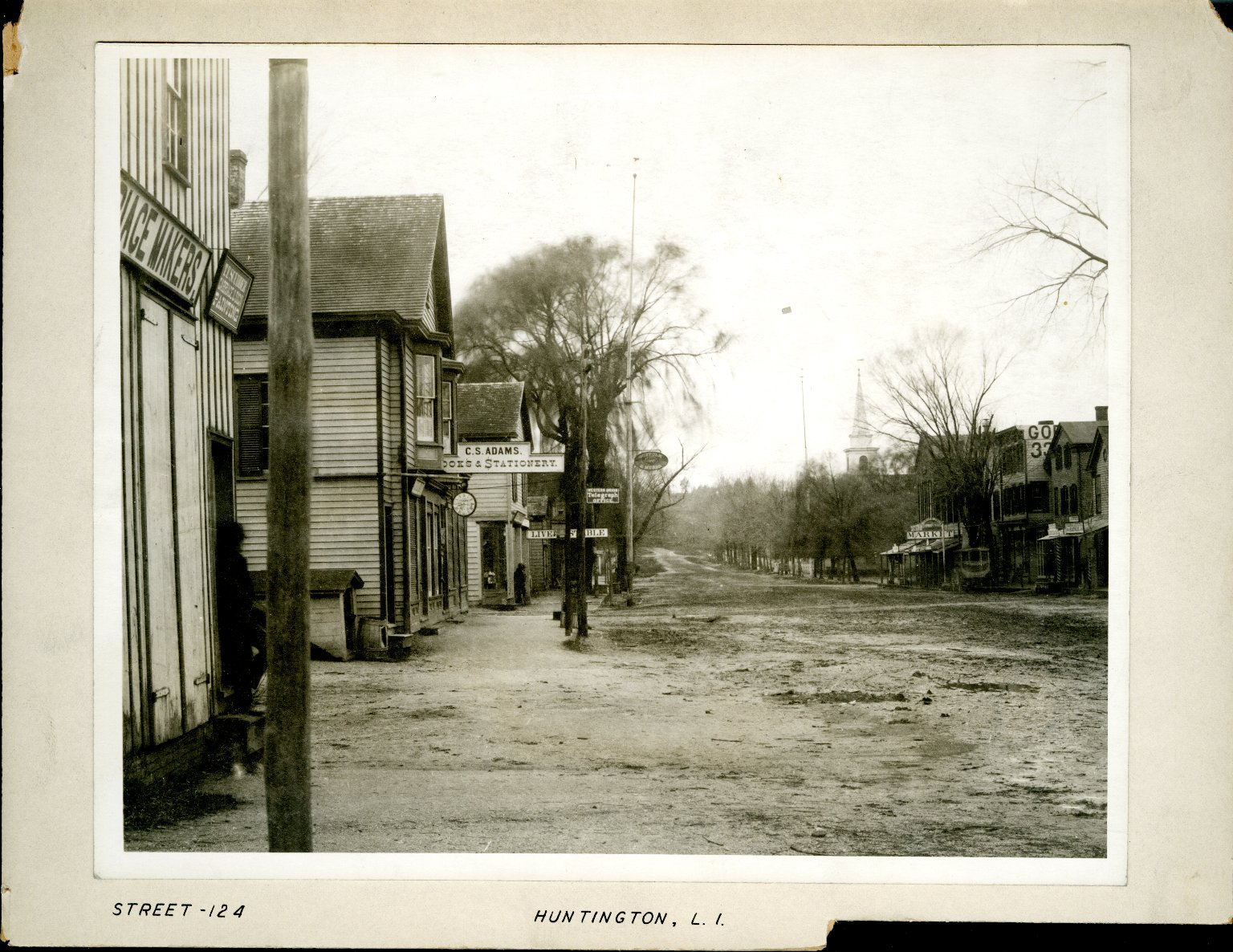
George Bradford Brainerd Street, ca. 1872–1887

In 1653, three men from Oyster Bay – Richard Holbrook, Robert Williams, and Daniel Whitehead – purchased a parcel of land from the Matinecock tribe. This parcel has since come to be known as the "First Purchase" and included land bordered by Cold Spring Harbor on the west, Northport Harbor on the east, what is now known as Old Country Road to the south, and the Long Island Sound to the north. The three men immediately turned the land over to the settlers who had already been living there.

Some believe the town was named in honor of the birthplace of Oliver Cromwell, born 25 April 1599 in Huntingdon, Kingdom of England, who was Lord Protector of the Commonwealth of England, Scotland and Ireland 1653–1658. From that initial settlement, Huntington grew over subsequent years to include all of the land presently comprising the modern Towns of Huntington and Babylon. The southern part of the town was formally separated to create Babylon in 1872.

Because Huntington was populated largely by English settlers, unlike the rest of the New Amsterdam colony, the town voted in 1660 to become part of the Connecticut Colony rather than remain under the authority of New Amsterdam. It was not until the British gained control of New Amsterdam in 1664 (renaming it New York) that Huntington was formally restored to the jurisdiction of New York.

On June 21st, 1774 in support of the Sons of Liberty in Boston after the Boston Port Act the town adopted its own Declaration of Rights. These rights include "... every freemans [sic] property is absolutely his own, and no man has a right to take it from him without consent, expressed by himself or his represenatives [sic]."

Before the Declaration of Independence the flag flying over Huntington was a British Red Ensign with the word "LIBERTY" on one side and "GEORGE III" on the other. On July 22nd, 1776 when the declaration was being read aloud in Huntington, the "GEORGE III" and the Union Jack were ripped off the flag. The flag was then carried into the Battle of Long Island by the Suffolk County Militia. The flag would be adopted by the town as its official flag shortly before the bicentennial. Following the Battle of Long Island during the American Revolutionary War, British troops used Huntington as their headquarters, and remained encamped there until the end of the war.

The arrival of the Long Island Rail Road in 1867 transformed the economy of Huntington from primarily agriculture and shipping (based on its well protected harbor) to tourism and commuting. Cold Spring Harbor became a popular summer resort.

The end of World War II brought about an explosive growth of population in Huntington as western Suffolk County began suburbanizing. Farms and resorts gave way to homes, and Huntington transformed into a major commuter town for nearby New York City.

In 1988, the Supreme Court ruled that Huntington had violated the Fair Housing Act by preventing apartment construction anywhere except in black neighborhoods. A developer of an affordable housing project sought to build it in a white neighborhood, but the town restricted the developer to black neighborhoods. The Supreme Court ordered the town to build an affordable housing project in a white neighborhood. Construction on that project began in 2023.

In 2019, Huntington banned the creation of new basement apartments. In 2023, a council member proposed legalizing basement apartments to alleviate the housing crisis in Huntington and other communities surrounding New York City. At a July 2023 hearing, in which local residents railed against "migrants, pedophiles, or criminals" moving into Huntington, council members backtracked on their support for the zoning change.

== Geography ==
Huntington is bounded by Long Island Sound to the north, Nassau County to the west, Babylon to the south, and Smithtown to the east. It also shares a small border with Islip to the southeast.

According to the United States Census Bureau, the town has a total area of 137.1 square miles (355 km^{2}), of which 94.0 square miles (243 km^{2}) is land and 43.1 square miles (112 km^{2}) (31.44%) is water.

=== Communities and locations ===
==== Villages (incorporated) ====
- Asharoken
- Huntington Bay
- Lloyd Harbor
- Northport

==== Hamlets (unincorporated) ====
- Centerport
- Cold Spring Harbor
- Commack (partly, with the Town of Smithtown)
- Dix Hills
- East Northport
- Eatons Neck
- Elwood
- Fort Salonga (partly, with the Town of Smithtown)
- Greenlawn
- Halesite
- Huntington
- Huntington Station
- Melville
- South Huntington
- West Hills

==== Former hamlets ====
- Vernon Valley, New York – A former hamlet bordering the village of Northport to the south, it has since been consumed by the hamlet of East Northport CDP, and has the Northport ZIP code.
- Crab Meadow – While the local area is still recognized as Crab Meadow by locals, including Crab Meadow beach and golf course, it has since been consumed by the hamlet of Fort Salonga CDP, and now has the Northport ZIP code.
- Wincoma – A neighborhood within the CDP in the village of Huntington Bay

== Demographics ==
Historical population
| Census | Pop. | Note | %± |
|---|---|---|---|
| 1790 | 3,260 | | — |
| 1800 | 3,894 | | 19.4% |
| 1810 | 4,424 | | 13.6% |
| 1820 | 4,935 | | 11.6% |
| 1830 | 5,582 | | 13.1% |
| 1840 | 6,562 | | 17.6% |
| 1850 | 7,481 | | 14.0% |
| 1860 | 8,924 | | 19.3% |
| 1870 | 10,704 | | 19.9% |
| 1880 | 8,098 | | −24.3% |
| 1890 | 8,277 | | 2.2% |
| 1900 | 9,483 | | 14.6% |
| 1910 | 12,004 | | 26.6% |
| 1920 | 13,893 | | 15.7% |
| 1930 | 25,582 | | 84.1% |
| 1940 | 31,768 | | 24.2% |
| 1950 | 47,506 | | 49.5% |
| 1960 | 126,221 | | 165.7% |
| 1970 | 200,172 | | 58.6% |
| 1980 | 201,512 | | 0.7% |
| 1990 | 191,474 | | −5.0% |
| 2000 | 195,289 | | 2.0% |
| 2010 | 203,264 | | 4.1% |
| 2020 | 204,127 | | 0.4% |
| 2021 (est.) | 204,197 | ▲ | 0.0% |
U.S. Decennial Census

Huntington, NY
| Data source | Population | White | Black | Asian | Native Americans | Pacific Islanders | Hispanic/Latino | Other | Two or more races |
|---|---|---|---|---|---|---|---|---|---|
| 2000 Census | 195,289 | 88.31% | 4.22% | 3.50% | 0.13% | 0.02% | 6.58% | 2.27% | 1.55% |
| 2010 Census | 203,264 | 84.15% | 4.68% | 4.96% | 0.20% | 0.02% | 11.00% | 3.89% | 2.10% |
| 2020 Census | 204,127 | 79.0% | 4.2% | 5.5% | 0.5% | 0.0% | 11.9% | 4.1% | 6.6% |

As of the census of 2000, there were 195,289 people, 65,917 households, and 52,338 families residing in the town. The population density was 2,078.4 inhabitants per square mile (802.5/km^{2}). There were 67,708 housing units at an average density of 720.6 units per square mile (278.2 units/km^{2}). The racial makeup of the town in 2000 was 88.31% White, 4.22% Black or African American, 0.13% Native American, 3.50% Asian, 0.02% Pacific Islander, 2.27% from other races, and 1.55% from two or more races. Hispanic or Latino of any race were 6.58% of the population. As of the census of 2010, the racial makeup of the town was 84.15% White, 4.68% Black or African American, 0.20% Native American, 4.96% Asian, 0.02% Pacific Islander, 3.89% from other races, and 2.10% from two or more races. Hispanic or Latino of any race were 11.00% of the population.

There were 65,917 households, out of which 37.1% had children under the age of 18 living with them, 67.4% were married couples living together, 8.9% had a female householder with no husband present, and 20.6% were non-families. 16.2% of all households were made up of individuals, and 6.7% had someone living alone who was 65 years of age or older. The average household size was 2.91 and the average family size was 3.26.

In the town, the population was spread out, with 25.5% under the age of 18, 5.8% from 18 to 24, 30.2% from 25 to 44, 25.5% from 45 to 64, and 13.1% who were 65 years of age or older. The median age was 39 years. For every 100 females, there were 96.2 males. For every 100 females age 18 and over, there were 93.4 males.

According to a 2023 estimate, the median income for a household in the town was $164,196, and the median income for a family was $190,280. About 4% of the population were below the poverty line, including 3.5% of those under age 18 and 6.2% of those age 65 or over.

== Economy ==
Sbarro's headquarters were located in Melville in the Town of Huntington until 2015.

Around 2002, Swiss International Air Lines's North American headquarters moved from Melville to Uniondale, Town of Hempstead. The facility, the former Swissair North American headquarter site, was completed in 1995. Swissair intended to own, instead of lease, its headquarters site. It enlisted architect Richard Meier to design the Melville facility.

In 1997, Aer Lingus announced that it was moving its North American headquarters from Manhattan to Melville; James Lyndon, a spokesperson for the airline, said that the company moved to Long Island in an effort to reduce costs, as leasing costs are lower on Long Island than in Manhattan. The move would transfer 75 employees, including administrative personnel, marketing personnel, sales personnel, and telephone reservation agents. The airline planned to move on June 15, 1997. The airline had also considered sites in Boston and in Westchester, New York.

=== Top employers ===
According to Huntington's 2025 Adopted Budget, the top employers in the town are:

| # | Employer | # of Employees |
|---|---|---|
| 1 | Canon | 3,103 |
| 2 | Northport Veterans Affairs Medical Center | 1,929 |
| 3 | Huntington Hospital | 1,810 |
| 4 | Estée Lauder | 1,700 |
| 5 | Half Hollow Hills School District | 1,682 |
| 6 | Henry Schein | 1,268 |
| 7 | Western Suffolk BOCES | 1,140 |
| 8 | South Huntington Union Free School District | 1,110 |
| 9 | Northport-East Northport School District | 945 |
| 10 | Huntington – Town Government | 773 |

== Government ==
=== Town government ===
The town government consists of a town council with four members, all of whom are elected at large. The town supervisor is elected by the entire town. Other elected positions are the Town Clerk, Highway Superintendent, and Receiver of Taxes. A referendum to move to a ward district system on December 22, 2009, failed 81% to 18%.

Until 2017, Huntington was generally controlled by the Democratic Party, having the same Democratic town supervisor, Frank Petrone, for 20 years prior to 2017. The town board followed suit during these years, generally being controlled by the Democratic Party. In 2017, the Republican Party took control of the town supervisor position with the election of Chad Lupinacci. The Republicans have held this position since. In the 2021 general election, the people of Huntington elected Edmund Smyth to the supervisor position. Two Republicans were also elected to the town board: Dr. Dave Bennardo and Salvatore Ferro. In the 2023 general election, Brooke Lupinacci and Theresa Mari were elected, creating a 5–0 super majority for the Republican Party on the town board. The town clerk position is held by Andrew Raia, and the highway superintendent is Andre Sorentino, both Republicans. The lone Democrat in the Huntington town government is Jillian Guthman.

The town supervisor is Edmund J.M. Smyth.

=== County legislators ===
Huntington has four representatives in the Suffolk County Legislature:

- Robert Trotta – 13th District (Ft. Salonga)
- Rebecca Sanin – 16th District (Greenlawn, Elwood, Commack, Dix Hills)
- Tom Donnelly – 17th District (Huntington Station, S. Huntington, West Hills, Melville)
- Stephanie Bontempi – 18th District (Northport-E. Northport, Centerport, Huntington, Cold Spring Harbor, and Lloyd Harbor)

Active Voter Registration and Party Enrollment as of July 1, 2025
| Party | Number of voters | Percentage |
|---|---|---|
| Democratic | 54,198 | 34.29% |
| Republican | 47,226 | 27.98% |
| Conservative | 2,578 | 1.63% |
| Working Families | 639 | 0.40% |
| Unaffiliated/Other | 53,411 | 33.97% |
| Total | 158,052 | 100% |

== Education ==
=== Colleges and universities ===
- Five Towns College in Dix Hills
- Seminary of the Immaculate Conception

=== School districts and high schools ===
Cold Spring Harbor Central School District

- Cold Spring Harbor Jr./Sr. High School

Commack School District

- Commack High School (located in the Town of Smithtown)

Elwood Union Free School District

- John Glenn High School

Half Hollow Hills Central School District

- Half Hollow Hills High School East
- Half Hollow Hills High School West

Harborfields Central School District

- Harborfields High School

Huntington Union Free School District:

- Huntington High School

Northport-East Northport Union Free School District

- Northport High School

South Huntington Union Free School District

- Walt Whitman High School

=== Private schools ===
- St. Anthony's High School

== Media ==
Several weekly newspapers cover local news exclusively, including The Long-Islander, since 1838 as well as The Times of Huntington by TBR News Media. The Village Connection Magazine, published by Jim Savalli, is a lifestyle and entertainment magazine dedicated to the town of Huntington. Additionally, Patch, an online-only news website formerly owned by AOL – as well as the Huntington Buzz, an online-only news website that is independently owned – cover hyper-local news on issues, people, and events in Huntington.

== Infrastructure ==
=== Transportation ===
==== Railroad lines ====
The Long Island Rail Road's Port Jefferson Branch serves the town's vicinity, and uses stations between Cold Spring Harbor through Northport. Huntington is the eastern terminus of electrification along the Port Jefferson Branch.

==== Bus service ====
The Town of Huntington is served primarily by Huntington Area Rapid Transit bus routes, though some routes from Suffolk County Transit also serve the town.

==== Major roads ====
- I-495 is the Long Island Expressway, and the sole interstate highway in the Town of Huntington, with interchanges from part of Exit 48 in West Hills on the Nassau-Suffolk County Line to Exit 52 in Commack.
- Northern State Parkway was the sole limited-access highway in the Town of Huntington until the construction of the Long Island Expressway. It has interchanges from Exit 39 in West Hills east of the Nassau-Suffolk County Line to Exit 43 in Commack on the Huntington-Smithtown Town Line.
- NY 25A, the northernmost west–east state highway on Long Island including the Town of Huntington. It enters the town from Laurel Hollow in Nassau County, running through historic Cold Spring Harbor, then downtown Huntington, later Centerport, Northport, and Fort Salonga where it crosses the Huntington-Smithtown Town Line.
- NY 25, the parent route of NY 25A, which also runs west to east along Jericho Turnpike. It enters the town at West Hills from Woodbury, passes through South Huntington, Elwood, and Commack, where it crosses the Huntington-Smithtown Town Line.
- Old Country Road, an extension of a principal west–east thoroughfare in Central Nassau County. It enters Suffolk County in a hidden overlap with Round Swamp Road at Exit 48 on I-495, then branches off to the northeast as it passes through West Hills, Melville, Dix Hills and South Huntington. Unlike in Nassau County, the road has no designation.
- NY 108, is the westernmost south–north state route in Suffolk County. It runs from Suffolk CR 11 at Cold Spring Harbor's LIRR station to NY 25A running along the edge of the Nassau County Line.
- NY 110, is a major south–north highway in Suffolk County. It enters the town from East Farmingdale near the State University of New York at Farmingdale, and runs through Melville, then South Huntington, Huntington Station, Downtown Huntington, and serves as the main road in Halesite, before finally terminating at Youngs Hill Road, where it becomes the undesignated East Shore Road.
- NY 231, has been entirely a four-lane divided highway throughout its existence. It enters the town from Deer Park in the Town of Babylon between Rutland and Kenmore Streets and runs through Dix Hills, where it has interchanges with I-495 and the Northern State Parkway. Immediately after the parkway, the route terminates at a fork in the road for Suffolk CRs 35 to the northwest and 66 to the northeast.
- CR 2 is Straight Path, a southwest to northeast county road running from the Babylon Town Line through Wyandanch as the main road, ending at NY 231 in Dix Hills.
- CR 3 is a south to north county route known as Wellwood Avenue from north of East Farmingdale at the Babylon Town Line to Ruland Road (CR 5) where it becomes Pinelawn Road until it reaches NY 110 in Melville.
- CR 11, includes Woodbury Road in Cold Spring Harbor, and Pulaski Road from Cold Spring Harbor through Fort Salonga.
- CR 35 is a de-facto extension of NY 231 running southwest to northeast from Dix Hills through NY 110 in Halesite.
- CR 67 includes the remaining drivable portion of the Long Island Motor Parkway.
- CR 92 is the south-to-north route from Oakwood Road from NY 25 in West Hills, Huntington Manor, and Huntington, then turns east onto High Street to end at NY 110.

==== Self-serve gas ====
Huntington is one of only two townships in the United States, alongside Weymouth, Massachusetts, to ban self-service gas stations at the township level and among the few places in the U.S. where full-service gas stations are compulsory and no self-service is allowed; the entire state of New Jersey and the western-Mid Valley portion of Oregon are the only other places in the country with similar laws.

== Notable people ==
- Jason Alexander, actor
- Wendy Andreiev (Wendy Wild), lead vocalist in the 1980s for several New York–based bands
- Al Arbour, lived in Cold Spring Harbor during his coaching career with the New York Islanders; moved in 1999, some years after his retirement
- Sam Aronson, director of the Brookhaven National Laboratory
- Ian Matthias Bavitz (Aesop Rock), hip-hop, rap artist
- Joe Bendik, professional soccer player
- Robert Bendiner, journalist, editor, and author
- Judith S. Bloch, a LCSW and activist in the field of early childhood education
- Brian Bloom, actor; previously lived in Dix Hills
- Bob Bourne, former New York Islanders player
- Stephen Bowen, Dallas Cowboys defensive end; lived in Dix Hills through high school
- Christie Brinkley, model
- Anthony Brown, Attorney General of Maryland
- Brendan B. Brown, lead vocalist for the band Wheatus
- Edwin G. Burrows, won 1999 Pulitzer Prize for History for the book Gotham: A History of New York City to 1898
- Greg Buttle, former NFL football player for the New York Jets
- Peter Calandra, Broadway, movie, and television pianist/composer
- Mariah Carey, singer-songwriter, born and raised in Centerport, New York; graduated from Harborfields High School in 1987.
- Alexandra Carter, academic, mediator, media personality, negotiation trainer, and author
- Harry Chapin, singer-songwriter and humanitarian
- John Coltrane, famed jazz saxophonist and composer; lived in Dix Hills during the last years of his life
- William A. Conant, member of the New York State Assembly
- Carin Cone, swimmer
- Gerry Cooney, former heavyweight boxer
- Bob Costas, sportscaster
- Anthony Cumia, former co-host of XM Satellite Radio program Opie and Anthony, current host of The Anthony Cumia Show
- Kenny Davern, jazz clarinetist
- Cornelius H. DeLamater, industrialist, and owner of Eaton's Neck
- Alice G. Dewey, anthropologist
- Marlene Dietrich, actress and singer
- James L. Dolan, Cablevision CEO; graduated in 1974 from Cold Spring Harbor High School
- Harry E. Donnell, noted architect, and Eaton's Neck estate owner
- Arthur Dove, artist
- Adam Ebbin, Senate of Virginia member
- Edie Falco, Broadway, movie, and television actress best known for her role as Carmela Soprano on The Sopranos
- Alison Fanelli, actress best known for the role on the television series The Adventures of Pete & Pete
- Greg Fox, nationally syndicated comic strip artist/writer (His comic Kyle's Bed & Breakfast takes place in Northport)
- Mark Gastineau, defensive end for the New York Jets; lived in Huntington Bay in the 1980s
- Andrew Geller, architect
- Clark Gillies, former New York Islanders hockey player and Hockey Hall of Famer
- Jackie Gleason, comedian; spent many summers in Asharoken
- Rube Goldberg, cartoonist
- Don Goldstein, All American and Pan American champion basketball player
- George Grosz, artist
- Leroy Grumman
- Tom Gugliotta, former NBA player
- Gladys Hall, journalist
- Julie Halston, actress and comedian
- Jupiter Hammon
- Sean Hannity, talk show and Fox News host
- John L. Hennessy, president of Stanford University
- Mike Haridopolos, U.S. representative for Florida
- Pete Harnisch, Major League pitcher
- Mel Harris, actress
- Tobias Harris, NBA player
- Melissa Joan Hart, actress, writer, director, producer, singer, and businesswoman
- Joseph Jeffrey Hazelwood, the ship's master of the Exxon Valdez at the time of the Exxon Valdez oil spill in the Prince William Sound, Alaska, on March 24, 1989
- Elizabeth Hendrickson, television actress best known for her role as twin sisters Frankie and Maggie Stone on All My Children.
- Ron Hextall, former NHL goalie
- John Sloss Hobart, owner of Eaton's Neck, and U.S. Senator; namesake of the Town's "Hobart Beach" in Eaton's Neck
- Bill and Bunny Hoest, co-creators of The Lockhorns
- Chris Hogan, NFL wide receiver two-time Super Bowl Champion with the New England Patriots.
- Gregg (Opie) Hughes
- "Cousin" Sal Iacono, comedian and writer
- Amy Ignatow, author and illustrator, The Popularity Papers
- Steve Israel, U.S. Representative (D-N.Y.)
- Curtis Jackson (50 Cent), lived in Dix Hills
- Bill Janovitz, musician and writer
- Billy Joel, singer
- Jenny Kallur, Swedish World Championships finalist in 100-meter hurdles; born in Huntington
- Susanna Kallur, Swedish World Indoor record holder in the 60-meter hurdles; born in Huntington
- Darius Kasparaitis, former NHL ice hockey player for the New York Islanders, Pittsburgh Penguins, Colorado Avalanche and the New York Rangers.
- Ricky Kasso, murderer
- Jack Kerouac, novelist and writer commonly credited as a major catalyst for the 1960s counterculture movement.
- Pat LaFontaine, professional hockey player
- Fiorello La Guardia, famed former mayor of New York City
- Michael Lardon, sport psychiatrist
- Lawrence C. Levy (born 1950), executive dean of the National Center for Suburban Studies at Hofstra University, and journalist
- Charles Lindbergh, aviator
- Lindsay Lohan, spent a portion of her childhood and teen years in Cold Spring Harbor. She attended Cold Spring Harbor High School until her Sophomore year of high school
- Mark LoMonaco, wrestler; grew up in Dix Hills
- Allie Long, professional soccer player
- Carey Lowell, actor; James Bond film Licence to Kill; Law & Order character Jamie Ross, 1996–2001
- Charles Ludlam, actor, playwright and founder of the Theater of the Ridiculous in New York City, grew up in Greenlawn and graduated from Harborfields High School.
- Patti LuPone, Tony Award-winning broadway and television actress, best known for her role as Eva Peron in Evita; raised in Northport
- John Macaluso, drummer
- Ralph Macchio, actor (The Karate Kid); raised in Dix Hills
- Ashley Massaro, former World Wrestling Entertainment (WWE) Diva
- Barbara McClintock (1902–1992), Nobel Prize-winning cytogeneticist, died in Huntington
- Chris Messina, television actor, best known for his role as Ted Fairwell on Six Feet Under
- Dina Meyer, actress
- Dan Milano, television writer and voice actor best known as the co-creator of the show Greg the Bunny
- Paul Steven Miller, commissioner, U.S. Equal Employment Opportunity Commission (1994–2004); Henry M. Jackson Professor of Law at the University of Washington School of Law (2004–present); Special Assistant to President Obama (2009)
- Richard P. Mills Lt. General (ret), USMC 1975–2015
- Eric Milnes (born 1959), harpsichordist, organist and conductor
- Josh Morgerman (born 1970), storm chaser, television personality, field correspondent, and businessman
- Bruce Morrison, former U.S. Congressman from Connecticut; grew up in Northport and attended Northport High School
- Henry A. Murphy (1867–1936), member of the New York State Assembly
- Jim Neu (1943–2010), playwright
- Daniel O'Donnell, New York State Assembly member
- Rosie O'Donnell, former talk show host and LGBT rights activist, raised in Commack
- Eugene O'Neill, playwright, in 1931
- Steve Park, NASCAR driver
- Laura Pergolizzi
- Todd Phillips, filmmaker known for The Hangover
- Mary Pickford, actress
- Randy Rainbow, comedian and singer, born in and grew up in Huntington until he was ten
- Gretchen Rau, Academy Award-winning motion picture set decorator
- Sarah Reinertsen, leg amputee and athlete who set many world records
- Alia Sabur, youngest professor in history
- Antoine de Saint-Exupéry, author of The Little Prince, written at Delamater-Bevin Mansion in Asharoken in 1942
- Paul Scheer, actor and podcast host
- John Scurti, television actor best known for his role as Kenny Shea on Rescue Me
- Bonnie Seeman, ceramic artist and University of Miami art professor
- Craig Ricci Shaynak, television character actor
- Cindy Sherman, photographer
- Adam Shoemaker, Episcopal clergyman
- David F. Schmitz, history professor at Whitman College
- Dee Snider, front man for rock band Twisted Sister
- David Spergel, theoretical astrophysicist and MacArthur Fellow; presently a professor at Princeton University known for his work on the WMAP mission and chair of the Astrophysics Subcommittee of the NASA Advisory Council
- Henry L. Stimson, Secretary of State under Herbert Hoover, Secretary of War under William Howard Taft and again for Franklin D. Roosevelt throughout World War II
- Brandon Sutter, NHL player for the Vancouver Canucks
- Ruth Ann Swenson, opera singer
- Wally Szczerbiak, NBA basketball player for the Cleveland Cavaliers; attended Cold Spring Harbor High School
- Evan Thomas, journalist; editor and author; grew up in Cold Spring Harbor
- Richard D. Veltri, mechanical engineer and Connecticut state legislator; was born in Huntington
- Ryan Vesce, player for the San Jose Sharks in the NHL, grew up in Lloyd Harbor, adjacent to Cold Spring Harbor, and attended Cold Spring Harbor High School
- Wesley Walker, former Jets wide receiver
- Booker T. Washington, African American civil rights activist
- James D. Watson, Nobel Prize winner, co-discoverer of the structure of DNA, and former Chancellor of the Cold Spring Harbor Laboratory
- Jim Wetherbee (born 1952), astronaut
- Meg Whitman, CEO of eBay and 2010 California gubernatorial candidate; grew up in Lloyd Harbor, adjacent to Cold Spring Harbor, and attended Cold Spring Harbor High School, graduating in 1973
- Walt Whitman, poet
- Judd Winick, writer/artist from MTV's The Real World San Francisco (former)

== In popular culture ==
- Huntington is the setting of the long-running comic strip The Lockhorns
- Huntington is the town in which the American sitcom Growing Pains supposedly takes place.

== See also ==
- 1946 Town of Huntington planning map from Wikimedia Commons
- National Register of Historic Places listings in Huntington, New York
- Heckscher Museum of Art
- Kelsey Outrage
