= Legislative Gazette =

- Type: Online news publication
- Format: Berliner
- Owner: State University of New York at New Paltz
- Publisher: Alan S. Chartock
- Editor: Darren Johnson
- Founded: 1978
- Language: English
- Headquarters: Empire State Plaza Concourse, Room 106 Albany, New York, United States
- Website: legislativegazette.com

The Legislative Gazette is a public affair news organization covering New York state government and politics from Albany, New York. Founded in 1978, the publication was created to cover the "politics, policy and people" associated with state government.

The publication is connected to the State University at New York at New Paltz Gazette was originally a weekly print newspaper covering politics and policy from the Empire State Plaza in Albany. It has moved from a traditional print model to a digital publication.The Gazette stopped printing in 2018 but has continued its work online as a student journalism program.

The publication is connected to the State University at New York at New Paltz and functions as an educational project on the Digital Media and journalism department, as well as for other majors.

The Gazette was originally a weekly print newspaper. It has moved to digital publication, having stopped printing in 2018. Under the new leadership of faculty member and longtime journalist Darren Johnson, who started in September 2025, the program has seen growth by adding students from other colleges and plans to bring back its print edition.

Staff writers for the news are college students in an internship program from SUNY New Paltz and, as of spring 2026, SUNY Albany, with other college students eligible to apply. Headquartered in the Empire State Plaza Concourse,. It provides an internship opportunity for students interested in journalism, government and media.

Founded by Alan S. Chartock, in partnership with SUNY New Paltz's Journalism and Political Science department, Glen C. Doty served as the publication's first editor, followed by John Bechtel and, later, James Gormley, who retired from the position in 2025.

The Gazette's current website publishes news, features and multimedia content related to New York state government and public affairs. The publication has also expanded its digital presence through podcasts, YouTube content and broader social media initiatives.

The Legislative Gazette is also the name of a weekly radio program covering New York government on WAMC Northeast Public Radio, where Chartock was also president and CEO. The program is hosted by David Guistina and includes commentary by Chartock, until his retirement in 2024.

The Gazette has had several distinguished alumni, including Alex Storozynski, a Pulitzer Prize–winning editor.
