= WANC =

WAMC public radio station in Ticonderoga, New York, United States

Satellite of WAMC-FM, Albany
- Ticonderoga, New York; United States
- Broadcast area: Glens Falls; Plattsburgh; Burlington
- Frequency: 103.9 MHz
- Branding: WAMC, Northeast Public Radio

Programming
- Format: Public radio
- Affiliations: National Public Radio

Ownership
- Owner: WAMC, Inc.

History
- First air date: September 6, 1982
- Former call signs: WXTY (1982–1990)
- Call sign meaning: Adirondack North Country (variation of WAMC)

Technical information
- Licensing authority: FCC
- Facility ID: 70842
- Class: A
- ERP: 1,550 watts
- HAAT: 116 meters (381 ft)
- Transmitter coordinates: 43°49′55.2″N 73°24′26.4″W

Links
- Public license information: Public file; LMS
- Website: www.wamc.org

WANC is a public radio station officially licensed to Ticonderoga, New York, and owned by WAMC, Inc. The station broadcasts at 103.9 MHz at 1,550 watts effective radiated power, and is a repeater of WAMC-FM serving the southern Champlain Valley.

== History ==
WANC originally signed on September 6, 1982, as WXTY with a Top 40 radio format; it was a sister station to WIPS. However, the station was only a rimshot into major nearby cities. It was never significant in either Burlington, Vermont, or Plattsburgh, New York, due to the presence of several other top 40 stations at the time, including WGFB "B100", WQCR "Q99" and upstart WXXX "95 Triple X".

In August 1990, Alan Chartock purchased WXTY from the then-owners of WIPS for $400,000. It became a repeater of WAMC-FM under the WANC calls for the southern Champlain Valley and Glens Falls/Lake George area. Despite it being a repeater station for WAMC, it is one a very small handful of noncommercial radio stations whose frequency is outside the standard frequency range for noncommercial FM radio stations (88–92 MHz) in the United States.

== See also ==
- WAMC-FM
