= Vern Partlow =

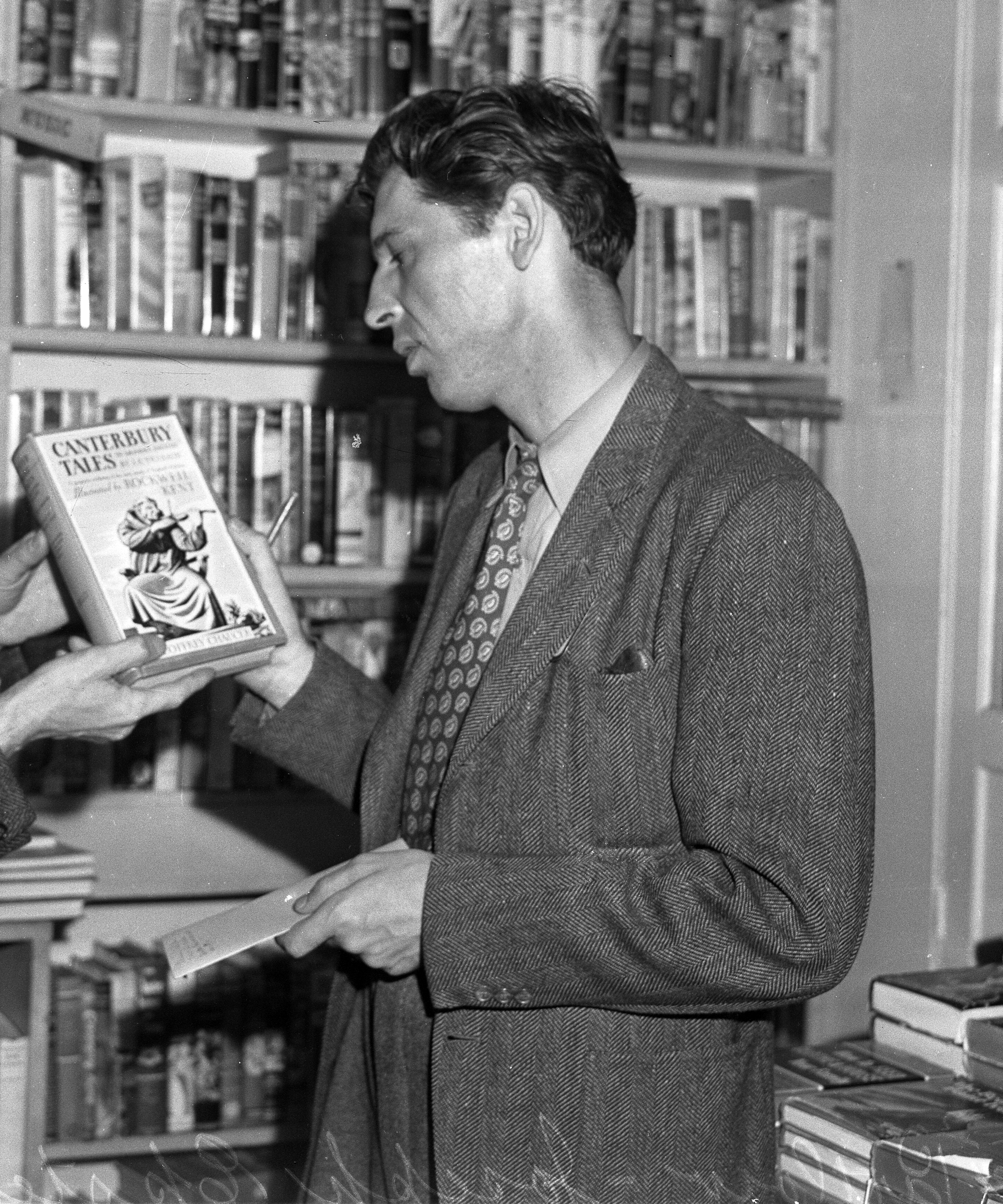
- Born: May 25, 1910; Bloomington, Illinois, U.S.
- Died: March 1, 1987 (aged 76); Los Angeles, California, U.S.
- Occupations: Journalist, folk singer
- Known for: composer, "Old Man Atom"

Vern Partlow (May 25, 1910 – March 1, 1987) was an American newspaper reporter and folk singer who was blacklisted during the McCarthy era. He composed the popular satirical song "Old Man Atom," which was famously banned during the period. It is considered one of the first anti-nuclear songs of the post-war era.

== Early life ==
Vern Partlow was born Verneil Hoover Partlow on May 25, 1910, in Bloomington, Illinois, a son of Abner Moses Partlow and Florence Hoover Partlow. His father Abner Moses Partlow (1874-1959) was born in Chester, Meigs County, Ohio, son of Moses Ackley Partlow (1848-1926), a farmer who family tradition states was a local preacher and with his older brother Joseph Partlow was captured briefly by Colonel Morgan's troops as they retreated through the Partlow family farm in 1863. The Partlows first came to Ohio in 1809 (listed in history of Meigs County, Ohio books as the second settler of Pomeroy) when Amos Partlow (1786-1866) and his wife Sarah Bailey Partlow (1788-1862) settled as farmers. These were the great-great-grandparents of Vern Partlow and their eldest son John Partlow (1812-1886) was the great-grandfather of Partlow. After the death of his first wife Abner Moses Partlow settled in Illinois around 1905 and married Florence Alva Hoover and had two sons, Eugene Partlow and Verniel Partlow. Partlow worked in early radio and wire services in Wisconsin and Chicago. He began working for Manchester Boddy's Los Angeles Daily News (which is unrelated to the current newspaper of the same name) in the 1939. He worked as a crime reporter as well as a writer of feature stories.

Partlow was also active in the trade union movement early in his life, even though he was also actively working as a newspaper journalist. In the mid-1940s, Partlow was host of a Los Angeles-based radio program about union issues which aired on a Congress of Industrial Organizations-owned radio station.

Partlow was an avid musician. The first of his songs to become widely known was the satirical "Newspapermen Meet Such Interesting People," composed in 1947. The song describes some of the murderers, thieves, and other disreputable people which a newspaper reporter meets, and lumps newspaper publishers in with them. The song, which includes a plea for reporters to join The Newspaper Guild (a labor union which represents reporters, among others), includes the stanza:

Oh, publishers are such interesting people;
Their policy's an acrobatic thing.
They shout they represent the common people.
It's funny Wall Street never has complained.
But publishers have worries, for publishers must go
To working folks for readers, and big shots for their dough;
Oh, publishers are such interesting people;
It could be press-titution, I don't know.

Around the time Partlow composed this song, he became a member of People's Songs. The group had been formed late in the evening on December 31, 1945, after folk singers Pete Seeger and Lee Hays convened a group of more than two dozen musicians in Seeger's Greenwich Village apartment in New York City. The goal of the organization was to create a radical left-wing movement of musicians. Partlow became part of People's Songs in late 1945, after several branches of the group were formed in California. For many years thereafter, Partlow remained at the core of left-wing musical culture on the West Coast.

He was also active politically. He was a public relations consultant to the California Attorney General races of Edmund G. "Pat" Brown in 1946 and 1950.

== "Old Man Atom" ==
After the atomic bombings of Hiroshima and Nagasaki on August 6 and 9, 1945, many people feared what might happen if a general nuclear war broke out, and a number of protest songs were written in protest of this new danger.

Partlow had interviewed nuclear weapons scientists for the Los Angeles Daily News in the early fall of 1945. They had told him what the effects of a nuclear war might be like, which deeply alarmed Partlow. Before the end of the year, he had written a talking blues song titled "Old Man Atom." The song treats its subject in comic-serious fashion, with a combination of black comedy puns (such as "We hold these truths to be self-evident/All men may be cremated equal" or "I don't mean the Adam that Mother Eve mated/I mean that thing that science liberated") on serious choices to be made in the nuclear age ("The people of the world must pick out a thesis/Peace in the world, or the world in pieces").

The song quickly gained attention among folk musicians. Pete Seeger first heard the song while traveling in California in the late summer or early fall of 1946. The song's music and lyrics were published in People's Songs (the newsletter for the People's Songs organization) in January 1947 under the title "Atomic Talking Blues." Irving Bibo Music held the copyright.

Seeger recorded the song under the title "Talking Atom" in 1948. Sam Hinton made a recording for the small California record label ABC Eagle in early 1950 (which later sold its rights to this recording to Columbia Records), and the Sons of the Pioneers made one for RCA Victor in the spring or summer of 1950. Lyrics referring to the United Nations and non-English-speaking countries building their own nuclear arsenals were changed in the Sons of the Pioneers recording, and replaced with blander lyrics about people coming together to end the threat of nuclear war. Fred Hellerman made a recording for the Jubilee label, and Ozzie Waters recorded one for Coral (a Decca subsidiary label). Even Bing Crosby was rehearsing a version to be released by Decca Records.

The song began catching on with the public. Popular New York City disc jockey Martin Block played it extensively on his show, Make Believe Ballroom and the song quickly began receiving significant airplay nationwide. Cash Box declared it the "Sleeper of the Week" (for its enduring longevity on the charts) in July 1950. Billboard declared it a "hit" in early August. By September 1950 it was a recognized hit record throughout the music industry. Billboard, Variety, and Cash Box all positively reviewed the song.

But "Old Man Atom" also was generating controversy. Protests were held to denounce what critics felt were communistic ideas in the lyrics. The New York City-based Joint Committee Against Communism, which had recently and successfully campaigned to have the actress Jean Muir kicked off the television program The Aldrich Family for allegedly having communist sympathies, began a grassroots effort against the song. This campaign had an immediate effect. Some radio stations banned the song, and Columbia Records and RCA Victor both withdrew copies of the song from sale at the end of August 1950. The widely syndicated anti-communist newspaper columnist Victor Riesel condemned the song. Partlow received some support, however. Life magazine denounced the withdrawal of the song from store shelves: "...we don't like the private censorship that has resulted in the withdrawal, by RCA Victor and Columbia Records, Inc., of a 'talking blues number' called Old Man Atom, presumably on receipt of complaints that it 'parrots' the current Communist line on peace." The New York Times editorialized that "A new high in absurdity has been reached by two large record manufacturers who have recently withdrawn from distribution a five-year-old song about the atomic bomb because of some protests that it coincided with current Communist 'peace' agitation. ...this new form of censorship by self-appointed groups is a threat to freedom. ... If the song that caused all the furor, 'Old Man Atom,' is propaganda at all, it is by rights American, not Russian, propaganda." Nonetheless, the song disappeared from both the airwaves and store shelves.

The ban, however, appeared to be short-lived. According to musician Ozzie Waters, the song returned to radio airplay a month later. But the song's popularity had ended, and sales never recovered. Nearly a decade after the controversy, music critic Robert Shelton called the song full of "savage humor".

== Later life and death ==
The controversy over "Old Man Atom" eventually led to Partlow's dismissal from his job. The song's notoriety led federal agents to investigate him for his left-wing political views. In October 1952, Partlow was named a member of the Communist Party by witnesses testifying before the House Un-American Activities Committee. Partlow was asked by the Los Angeles Daily News to publicly declare that he was not a member of the Communist Party USA, and he refused on the grounds that no one should be required to publicly declare his political affiliation as a requirement to keep his job. The Daily News fired him and he was blacklisted. Partlow's union, The Newspaper Guild, appealed his dismissal as a violation of the union's contract with the newspaper. An arbitration committee ruled 3-to-2 against the Guild.

After his dismissal, Partlow worked extensively in public relations and government. He was a public relations consultant in the Los Angeles mayoral campaign of Fletcher Bowron in the early 1950s, the Los Angeles City Council races of Edward R. Roybal in the late 1950s. Later, in the 1960s and 1970s, Partlow worked as a publicist and public relations expert for a number of Jewish organizations in the Los Angeles area.

Partlow remained part of the protest song movement as well. Partly wishing to encourage younger songwriters like Partlow, Pete Seeger established the magazine Broadside in 1961 to promote the work of younger folk artists. "Old Man Atom" made a comeback among folk singers in the 1960s, and Tom Glazer made a very popular recording which he released as part of his Songs of Peace, Freedom, and Protest set in 1970.

Vern Partlow died of cancer in a hospital in Los Angeles, California, on March 1, 1987. He was survived by three sons.

The first two stanzas of "Newspapermen Meet Such Interesting People" are played at the start and finish of The Media Project, a weekly radio program on National Public Radio.

== Partial list of Partlow songs ==
A partial listing of Partlow's more popular folk and protest songs includes:

- "I'm a Native American Nazi"
- "My Name is Cannery Bill"
- "Newspapermen Meet Such Interesting People"
- "Old Man Atom" (also known as "Talking Atom" and "Atomic Talking Blues")
- "Susan's in the Union"
- "The U.A.W. Train"

== Bibliography ==
- Alwood, Edward. Dark Days in the Newsroom: McCarthyism Aimed at the Press. Philadelphia: Temple University Press, 2007.
- "Ban Is Put On Song About the Atom." New York Times. September 1, 1950.
- Burton, Bernie. "Newspapers at Risk of Becoming Shopping Specials." Ventura County Star. March 23, 1998.
- Cogley, John and Miller, Merle. Blacklisting: Two Key Documents. New York: Arno Press, 1971.
- Cohen, Ronald D. Rainbow Quest: The Folk Music Revival and American Society, 1940-1970. Amherst, Mass.: University of Massachusetts Press, 2002.
- "Col Buys ABC Atom." Billboard. August 5, 1950.
- Dunaway, David King. How Can I Keep From Singing: Pete Seeger. New York: Da Capo Press, 1981.
- Escobar, Edward J. Race, Police, and the Making of a Political Identity: Mexican Americans and the Los Angeles Police Department, 1900-1945. Berkeley, Calif.: University of California Press, 1999.
- Hamrah, A.S. "Bombay Is Atomic India." Boston Globe. October 13, 2002.
- Heldenfels, R.D. "Love 'Little People, Big World'." Tulsa World. April 18, 2010.
- Hillinger, Charles. "Modern Songwriters Tune In to Atomic Bomb." Los Angeles Times. February 11, 1992.
- Lotchin, Roger W. The Way We Really Were: The Golden State in the Second Great War. Urbana, Ill.: University of Illinois Press, 2000.
- "No Private Censors." Life. September 11, 1950.
- "Old Man Atom." New York Times. September 9, 1950.
- "The Press: The Right to Loyalty." Time. September 1, 1952.
- "RCA Victor Quietly Quashes Its 'Old Man Atom' Recording." Variety. August 31, 1950.
- Rense, Rip. "The Ink-Stained Memoirs." Los Angeles Times. May 4, 2003.
- Shelton, Robert. "Ancient Art of Poking Fun - on LP." New York Times. March 22, 1959.
- Shelton, Robert. No Direction Home: The Life and Music of Bob Dylan. Cambridge, Mass.: Da Capo Press, 2003.
- "Vern Partlow: His Peace Song Stirred Ruckus." Los Angeles Times. March 4, 1987.
- Wolfe, Charles K. and Akenson, James Edward. Country Music Goes to War. Lexington, Ky.: University Press of Kentucky, 2005.
