= Michael Lardon =

American psychiatrist

- Born: May 25, 1960 (age 66); Huntington, New York
- Citizenship: United States
- Education: Rice University in Houston, Texas Stanford University << University of Texas at Galveston Medical School University of California, San Diego Medical Center
- Occupation: Psychiatrist
- Known for: UC San Diego
- Notable work: University of California, San Diego
- Website: DrLardon.com

Michael Theodore Lardon is an American sport psychiatrist. Lardon is an Associate Clinical Professor at the University of California, San Diego School of Medicine, and is the author of two books, "Mastering Golf's Mental Game" (Random House 2014) and "Finding Your Zone: 10 Core Lessons for Peak Performance in Sports and Life" (Penguin 2008).

== Early life ==
A former United States Table Tennis Junior Champion, as well the 1981 United States National Sports Festival gold medalist in mixed doubles table tennis, Lardon attended Stanford University, where he studied psychology. Lardon's senior research paper for Professor Albert Bandura (Social learning theory) was on mental visualization in the context of human peak performance. He also was a teaching assistant for Dr. Philip Zimbardo (Principal investigator of the Stanford Prison Study), Dr. Robert Ornstein (Author of the "Psychology of Consciousness") and for Dr. Stephen LaBerge, a leader in the scientific study of lucid dreaming. In 1985, Lardon received his Bachelor of Arts in Psychology.

In 1990, Lardon completed his internship in internal medicine at St. Mary's Hospital in Long Beach, CA (a UCLA affiliate hospital) after graduating medical school in 1989 from the University of Texas medical branch at Galveston. In 1994, he won the UCSD Department of Psychiatry Judd (Louis Judd, Past Chairman, National Institute of Mental Health) Research Award for his work on the neuroelectric assessment of enhanced athletic peak performance. In August 1994, this research was awarded grant funding by the United States Tennis Association by the administrator of sports science, E. Paul Roetert, Ph.D.

During his psychiatry residency training at UCSD he caddied for his brother Brad Lardon in the finals of the PGA Tour Qualifying School in La Quinta, CA. His experience was first chronicled in John Feinstein’s best selling book, "A Good Walk Spoiled" and later in the January 1995 issue of Golf Magazine where he read his brother's final putt to determine if Brad Lardon would earn fully exempt status on the PGA Tour. Lardon under-read the putt but his brother hit it too hard, taking the break out of it and the ball hit the back of the cup, bounced straight up and fell back in giving Brad Lardon his second fully exempt year on the PGA Tour.

== Career ==
In July 1994 Lardon continued his clinical studies in athletic peak performance during his fellowship in Psychobiology and Psychopharmacology at UCSD. After his fellowship he started his career as a sports psychiatrist on the PGA Tour, first helping Kemper Open champion Mike Springer. In 2001, Lardon was contacted by James Bauman, Senior Sports Psychologist at the United States Olympic Training Center in Chula Vista, CA, to evaluate U.S. Olympic skeleton hopeful Jimmy Shea who had been referred to him for the treatment of depression. Jimmy Shea won the Olympic gold medal in the skeleton in 2001. Immediately after winning Olympic gold medal Shea pulled out a picture card of his grandfather, Jack Shea (two-time Olympic speed skating champion) and held the picture up for the National and International media in celebration of his victory. In Guidepost magazine, Shea credits Dr. Lardon for giving the suggestion of taking his grandfather's photo and putting it in his helmet on the day of the race. After the 2002 Olympics, Jimmy Shea and Dr. Lardon's work together was chronicled in an article in Sports Illustrated magazine, they then went on a public relations tour, sponsored by the pharmaceutical company Wyeth-Ayerst focusing on the destigmatization of depression in men.

Lardon continued to work with a number of Olympic athletes, including the 2004 Olympic Silver medalist in crew, Samantha Magee; the 2006 Olympic team captain of the men's four-man bobsled, Steve Holcomb; four-time Olympic dressage competitor Steffen Peters and the 2004 400-meter hurdler Brenda Taylor. He continued his work with the Olympic athletes while expanding his presence in the golf world. He has worked with the 2001 British Open champion, David Duval; the 2002 PGA champion, Rich Beem, the 2005 U.S. Open champion, Michael Campbell and five-time major champion Phil Mickelson. Mickelson credits Lardon for helping him win the 2013 British Open. Lardon has also coached 2021 Masters runner-up Will Zalatoris and LPGA winner Céline Boutier. Lardon has also worked with athletes in other sports, including former San Diego Chargers Pro Bowl kicker Nate Kaeding, champion show jumper Vinton Karrasch and UFC fighter Dominick Cruz.

Lardon has authored numerous academic articles relating to sports performance, including the "Sports Psychiatrist and Golf", and "Performance Enhancing Drugs: Where Should the Line Be Drawn and By Whom?"
