= Alex Storozynski =

American author

Alex Storozynski (born 1961) is an American author and former president, and as of 2025, chairperson of the Kosciuszko Foundation.

In 1999 he shared a Pulitzer Prize for Editorial Writing as a member of the editorial board of the New York Daily News.

== Early life and education ==
Storozynski was born in a Polish neighborhood in Greenpoint, New York in 1961. His parents Dionizy and Irena Storożyński emigrated to the United States from Poland. After World War II they settled in London.

Storozynski has a B.A. in political science from the State University of New York at New Paltz, where he was involved in the Model United Nations program, and interned for the Legislative Gazette. He earned an M.S. from the Columbia University Graduate School of Journalism.

He was also a post graduate fellow at the University of Warsaw in Poland.

== Career ==
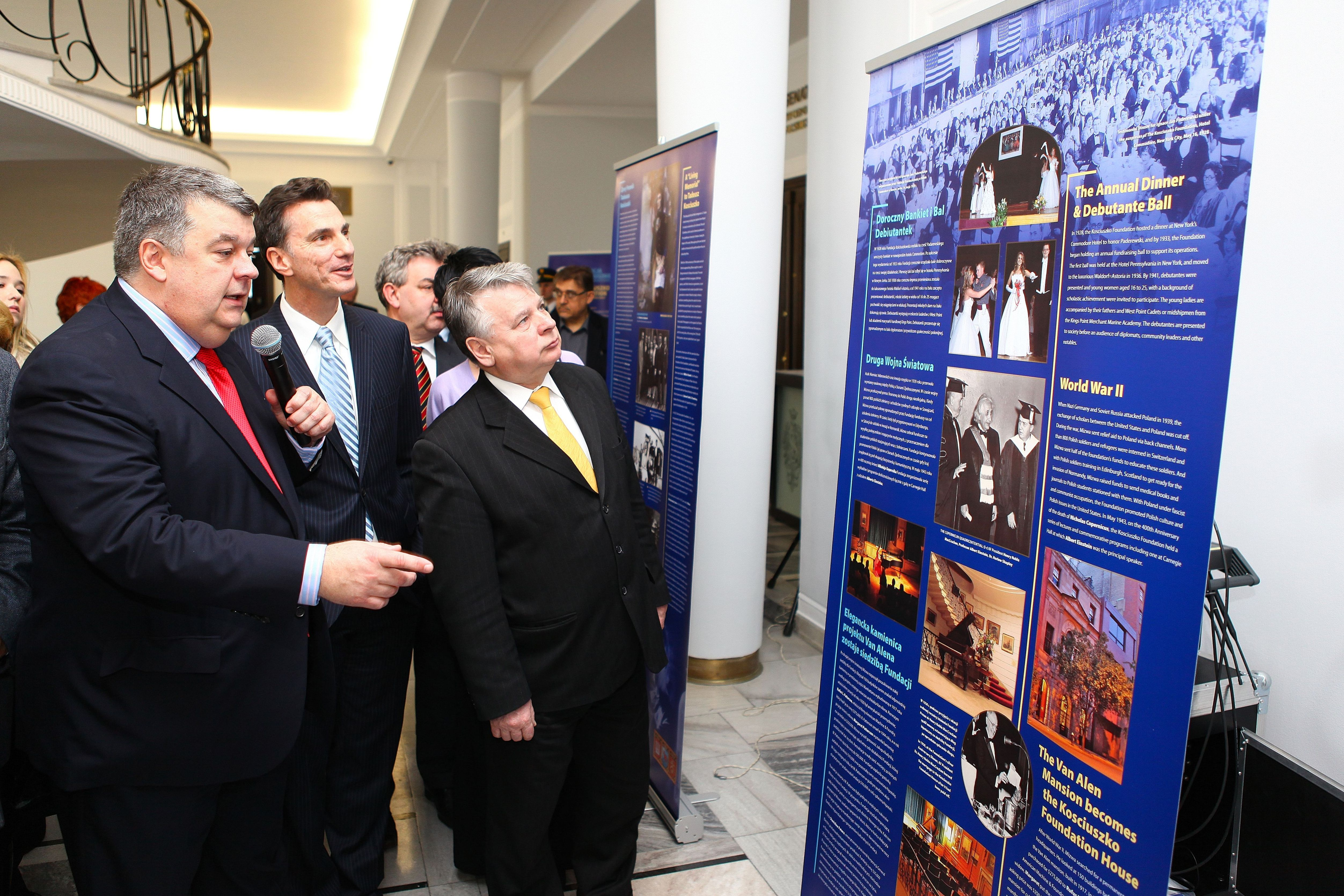
Alex Storożyński (left) at the Polish Senate, 2011

Starting in 1988, Storozynski worked as an editor in New York City, first at the Queens Chronicle, and later for the Empire State Report, based in Albany, New York. In 1993, he became a press secretary, serving the New York State Thruway Authority, the New York State Canal Corporation, and the New York Attorney General.

Storozynski was a member of the New York Daily News editorial board, starting in 1996. In 1999, the editorial board was awarded a Pulitzer Prize for Editorial Writing for "its effective campaign to rescue Harlem's Apollo Theatre from the financial mismanagement that threatened the landmark's survival".

He was the founding editor of amNewYork. He later was the city editor of the New York Sun. He has also been published in the European edition of The Wall Street Journal, Chicago Tribune, The New York Post, Newsday and other publications.

He was a chairman of the Federal Credit Union Board of Directors.

In November 2008, he was elected President of The Kosciuszko Foundation. As of July 2016, he became chairman of the Board of Trustees of that Foundation.

His biography of Kosciuszko, The Peasant Prince: Thaddeus Kosciuszko and the Age of Revolution, was published in 2009 by St. Martin's Press, winning several awards, including the 2010 Fraunces Tavern Museum Book Award and the Knights Templar Military History Award, the "Military Order of Saint Louis."

Storozynski's essay "From Serfdom to Freedom: Polish Catholics Find A Refuge," was published in the book Catholics in New York, Society Culture, and Politics, 1808–1946, to coincide with the exhibit on Catholics at the Museum of the City of New York.

== Honors ==
In September 2011, Polish President Bronislaw Komorowski awarded Storozynski with the Officer's Cross of the Order of Merit of the Republic of Poland.

In February 2012, Nobel Peace Prize Winner, President Lech Wałęsa awarded Storozynski with the Lech Wałęsa Media Award.

== Works ==
- Alex Storozynski, The Peasant Prince: Thaddeus Kosciuszko and the Age of Revolution, 1st edition, Thomas Dunne Books, 2009.
- Alex Storozynski, Spies in My Blood: Secrets of a Polish Family's Fight Against Nazis & Communists, Polestar-Media, 2024, ISBN 979-8991187503, 378 pp.

== See also ==
- "Polish death camp" controversy
