= Irving Bibo =

American songwriter (1889–1962)

- Born: August 22, 1889; San Francisco, California, U.S.
- Died: May 2, 1962 (aged 72) West Los Angeles, California, U.S.
- Occupations: Composer, songwriter, and publisher

Irving Bibo (August 22, 1889 – May 2, 1962) was an American composer, songwriter, and publisher.

== Biography ==
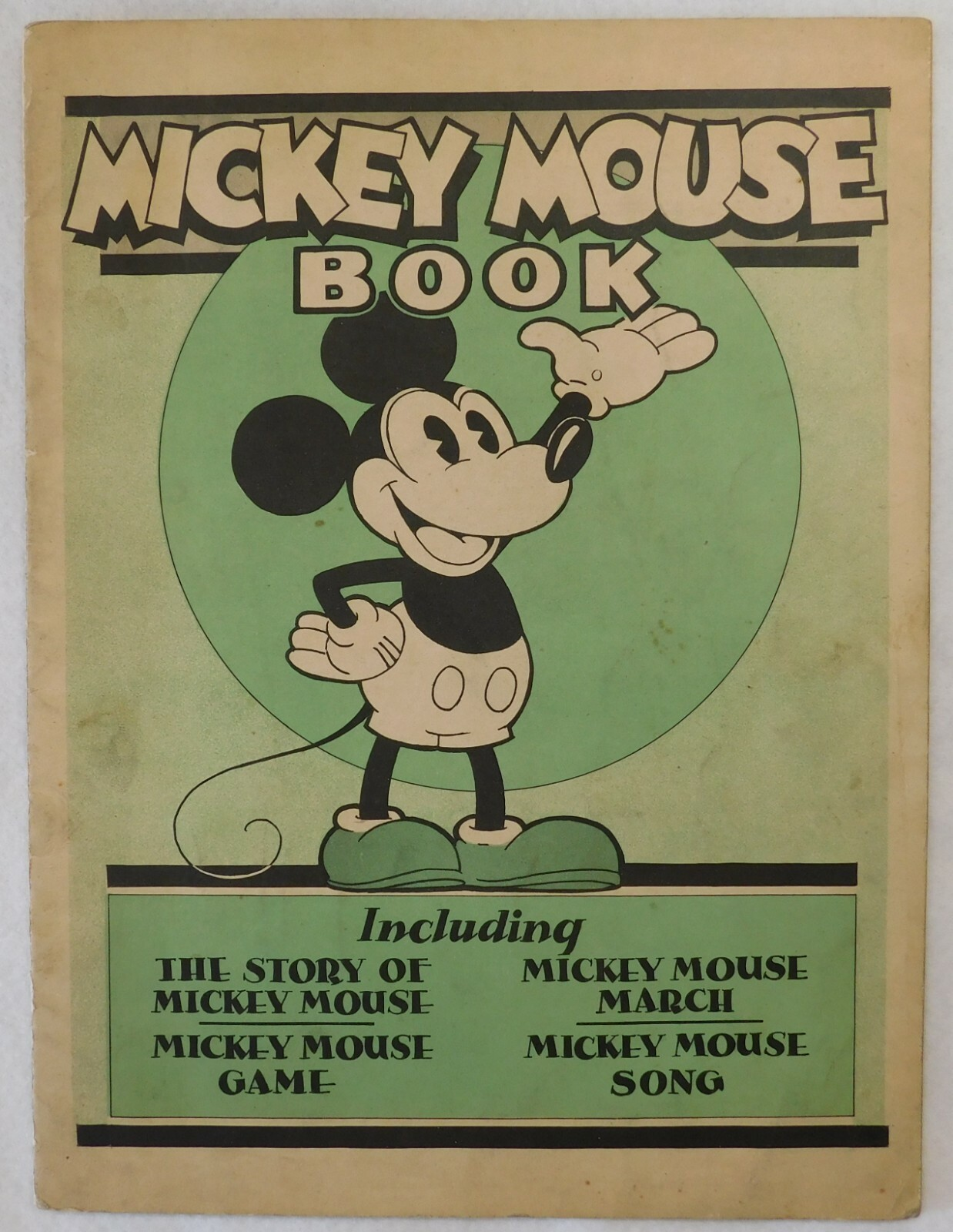
Cover of the Mickey Mouse Book that Bibo contributed a game to

Bibo was born in San Francisco.

He began his career in New York in the mid 1910s as a Tin Pan Alley composer, writing tunes for the Ziegfeld Follies (including "Huggable, Kissable You", "Forever and a Day" and "Cherie"), the Greenwich Village Follies, and other theatrical productions. He was a staff pianist for Leo Feist (where in 1921 he gave Billy Rose his first songwriting break by contributing music for Ain't Nature Grand).

In 1933 he moved to Los Angeles and scored more than 300 motion pictures, and later in life published several fight songs.

Bibo was the first licensee of Disney merchandise. His daughter Bobette, at the age of 12, wrote the book Mickey Mouse Book, containing stories, games, and cutouts. He contributed the song Mickey Mouse (You Cute Little Feller). It was illustrated by Walt Disney Studios, and published by Bibo and Charles Lang in 1930.

== Selected compositions ==
- Huggable, Kissable You
- Forever and a Day
- Cherie (an American fox trot song with a Parisian twist), lyrics by Leo Wood
- Those Panama Mamas
- Am I Wasting My Time on You
- My Cutey's Due at Two-to-Two To-Day
- Sweet Little You
- Do You Believe in Dreams
- Lo-Ki (1919, with Ed Rose and Henry Bergman)
- I've Got the Profiteering Blues (lyrics by Al Wilson, featuring the complaint "the more I make, the more they take")
- Where Are You, Girl of My Dreams? (1932, written with Bing Crosby and Paul McVey, featured in the film The Cohens And Kellys in Hollywood).
- Letty Pepper, a musical comedy produced by Oliver Morosco, a sequel to Morsco's earlier Letty productions So Long Letty, Linger Longer Letty, and Let 'Er Go, Letty, all starring Charlotte Greenwood. It was an adaptation of Charles Klein's play Maggie Pepper; Bibo contributed lyrics with Leo Wood, the music was by Werner Janssen. It ran for 32 performances in 1922 at the Vanderbilt Theatre. Songs included:
  - Every Little Miss Must Have a Mister
- (Once Upon) A Moonlight Night, written with Sydney Clare
- Where have those Old Timers Gone (1924, written with Howard Johnson and Henry Santly)
- Dancing Down in Dixie Land (with Abe Olman)
- Ain't Nature Grand (1921, lyrics by Billy Rose)
- Old Man Atom (a satirical anti-nuclear song from around 1946 popularized by Pete Seeger, written with Vern Partlow, for which Bibo sold the rights to Alamo Music in 1950)
- Oriental Eyes (with Leo Wood, an adaptation of Cesar Cui's Orientale)
- Sealed Hearts (1919, lyrics by Alex Sullivan)

For schools:

- The Stanford Scalp Song (1953, with Paul Yoder)
- Sing UCLA
- Fight On Michigan State
