= The Media Project =

American weekly radio program

- Genre: Politics, Journalism
- Running time: 25 minutes
- Country of origin: United States
- Home station: WAMC
- Syndicates: National Productions
- Starring: Rex Smith; Ira Fusfeld; Ian Pickus; Barbara Lombardo; Judy Patrick
- Created by: Alan Chartock
- Executive producer: Alan Chartock
- Opening theme: "Newspaper Men" (Pete Seeger)
- Ending theme: "Newspaper Men"
- Website: www.wamc.org/show/the-media-project
- Podcast: Feed

The Media Project is a weekly radio program that provides an inside look at media coverage of current events. Panelists on the discussion-based show include Times Union Editor-at-Large Rex Smith, WAMC News Director Ian Pickus, Daily Freeman Publisher Emeritus Ira Fusfeld, Former Editor of “The Saratogian” Barbara Lombardo, and Former Editor of “The Daily Gazette” and Vice President for Editorial Development for the New York Press Association Judy Patrick. The half-hour program is recorded at WAMC's studios in Albany, New York and distributed by National Productions. During the show, the panelists engage in spirited debate on timely media issues. Print, television, radio, and internet media are covered. In addition, mail from listeners is sometimes read and discussed. The theme song of The Media Project is "Newspapermen Meet Such Interesting People", composed by Vern Partlow and sung by Pete Seeger.

Produced and distributed by WAMC's National Productions, The Media Project airs on WAMC on Sunday at 6:00 p.m. and on Monday at 3:00 p.m., and on several other stations throughout the United States.

== Panelists ==
Three or four panelists appear on each show. Smith is on every week, and Fusfeld, Lombardo, Patrick, and Pickus can be heard on a rotational basis. Chartock served as host of the program in its early years, but that duty was eventually taken up by Smith.

=== Current ===
- Ira Fusfeld: Publisher Emeritus of the Daily Freeman.
- Rex Smith: Editor-at-Large of the Times Union.
- Barbara Lombardo: Former Editor of “The Saratogian”
- Judy Patrick: Former Editor of “The Daily Gazette” and Vice President for Editorial Development for the New York Press Association
- Ian Pickus: News Director, WAMC

=== Former ===
A number of panelists have appeared on the show over the years. They include:

- Lydia Kulbida: Former anchor at WNYT, now WTEN anchor at 4 p.m.
- Monte Trammer: Publisher of the Star-Gazette.
- Elisa Streeter: Anchor at WTEN.

== See also ==
- On the Media
