= Alexandra Carter (negotiator) =

American legal negotiator

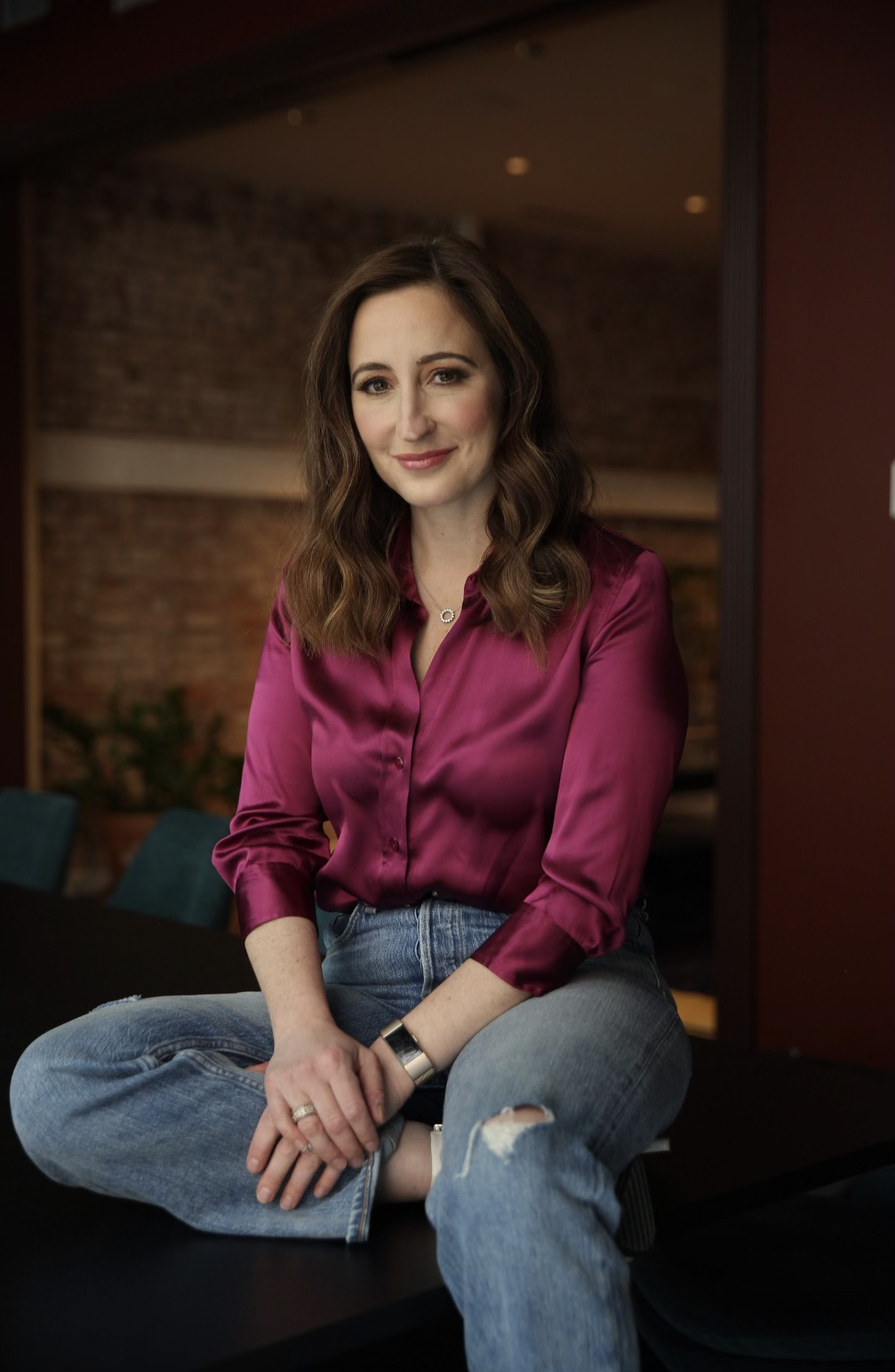
- Born: Alexandra Beth Carter; January 3, 1976 (age 50)
- Education: Georgetown University, Columbia Law School
- Awards: Presidential Award for Outstanding Teaching
- Website: alexcarterasks.com

Alexandra Beth Carter (born January 3, 1976) is an American academic, mediator, media personality, negotiation trainer, and author. She is a clinical professor of law at Columbia Law School (CLS), where she directs and teaches the Mediation Clinic.

== Early life and education ==
Carter was born on January 3, 1976, and grew up in Huntington, New York. She graduated cum laude from Georgetown University, where she studied English and Mandarin Chinese and won the Lena Landegger Community Service Award. Following graduation, she was awarded a Fulbright scholarship to Taiwan, where she studied literature. Carter earned her J.D degree from Columbia Law School with James Kent and Harlan Fiske Stone honors. She was awarded the Jane Marks Murphy Prize for clinical work and the Lawrence S. Greenbaum Prize for best oral argument in the 2002 Harlan Fiske Stone Moot court Competition.

== Career ==
After practicing at Cravath, Swaine & Moore LLP as a litigator, Carter became a clinical law professor and director of the Mediation Clinic at Columbia Law School. Through the Mediation Clinic, Carter and her students provide free conflict resolution services and training to people and organizations who otherwise would not be able to afford it. She has been a negotiation trainer for the United Nations, Fortune 500 companies, federal and state courts, the US government, and foreign governments.

In 2012 Carter trained United Nations diplomats as part of the first negotiation skills-building summit for women, entitled Women Negotiating Peace. In 2016, Carter brokered a formal Memorandum of understanding between the United Nations Institute for Training and Research and Columbia Law School, through which Carter and her CLS students in the Mediation Clinic provide negotiation training for the New York diplomatic corps. Carter and her students have trained diplomats from more than 80 nations on negotiation-related subjects, including gender equity, access to justice and amplification.

Carter is a regular commentator on negotiation in the workplace, as well as on pay equity for women, with appearances on CBS This Morning, MSNBC’s LIVE Weekend, Hardball, Morning Joe, NPR Marketplace, and in The New York Times and Wall Street Journal. She is a contributor for NBC News’ Know Your Value, an empowerment community that helps all women recognize, and be recognized for, their worth in business and in life.

In 2020 Carter published her first book, Ask For More: 10 Questions to Negotiate Anything. It became a Wall Street Journal bestseller – the first negotiation book solo-authored by a woman to make that list.

== Awards and memberships ==
In 2019 Carter was awarded the Presidential Award for Outstanding Teaching, Columbia University's highest teaching honor. She serves on the New York State Alternative dispute resolution Advisory Committee, as part of a group of judges, lawyers, practitioners and academics that make recommendations for improvement and expansion of dispute resolution initiatives for the New York State court system.

== Personal life ==
Carter met her husband, Gregory Lembrich, in 2000 at Columbia Law School. They married in 2006.

== Publications ==
- Ask for More, 10 Questions to Negotiate Anything, Simon & Schuster, 2020
- "An Introduction to Mediation for Estate Planners," (Susan N. Gary, ed.), as part of Mediation for Estate Planners: Estate Planning, Probate, Guardianships and Bioethics, 2012
- "Hey, That’s My Copyright: Exploring the Boundaries of the Work-for-Hire Doctrine," New York Law Journal, April 2007
