= Wincoma, New York =

- Hamlet
- Location within the state of New York
- Coordinates: 40°54′10″N 73°25′33″W
- Country: United States
- State: New York
- County: Suffolk
- Town: Huntington
- Village: Huntington Bay
- Elevation: 33 ft (10 m)
- Time zone: UTC-5 (Eastern (EST))
  - Summer (DST): UTC-4 (EDT)
- ZIP code: 11743
- Area code: 631

Wincoma is a former hamlet and neighborhood in on the westernmost headland of East Neck in the Town of Huntington, in Suffolk County, on the North Shore of Long Island, in New York, United States.

The hamlet survives within the Village of Huntington Bay in the Town of Huntington. Wincoma was an estate-heavy enclave and many maps denote it to this day because of its importance in literature and media of the Gilded Age. It is now mainly smaller homes rather than estates. Access to Wincoma Beach is restricted and available only to residents and their guests.
