= WQQQ =

Satellite of WAMC-FM, Albany, New York
- Sharon, Connecticut; United States
- Frequency: 103.3 MHz
- Branding: WAMC Northeast Public Radio

Programming
- Format: Public radio

Ownership
- Owner: WAMC, Inc.

History
- First air date: October 7, 1993
- Former call signs: WWPR (1989–1992)

Technical information
- Licensing authority: FCC
- Facility ID: 54785
- Class: A
- ERP: 1,500 watts
- HAAT: 186 meters (610 ft)
- Transmitter coordinates: 41°55′8.3″N 73°34′20.4″W

Links
- Public license information: Public file; LMS

WQQQ (103.3 FM) is a radio station licensed to Sharon, Connecticut, in northwestern Litchfield County. WQQQ also serves adjacent Dutchess County, New York, and southern Berkshire County, Massachusetts. The station is a public radio station, operating as part of the Albany, New York–based WAMC network.

== History ==
The station obtained the WQQQ call letters on November 1, 1992. WQQQ went on the air on October 7, 1993, with a live morning drive show followed by a simulcast of then-sister station WREF (850 AM). In the evening and overnights, the station broadcast classical music from the Beethoven Network. WQQQ began programming separately full-time in March 1996 and aired a full service format featuring adult contemporary music format as "Q-103 FM". On February 7, 2011, WQQQ ended the full service format and became a public radio station operated by Sacred Heart University's WSHU-FM.

In January 2021, WSHU announced its decision not to renew the broadcasting agreement with WQQQ. WQQQ ceased simulcasting WSHU on January 31, 2021, shifting to an automated easy listening format. In October 2021, the Ridgefield Broadcasting Corporation filed to sell WQQQ to another public radio organization, WAMC, for $500,000. The sale was consummated on November 24, 2021.
