= Sam Hinton =

American folk singer, harmonica player, marine biologist (1917–2009)

- Born: Sam Duffie Hinton; March 31, 1917; Tulsa, Oklahoma, U.S.
- Died: September 10, 2009 (aged 92); Berkeley, California, U.S.
- Occupation(s): Musician, naturalist, educator, aquarist
- Years active: 1936–2009
- Spouse: Leslie Forster
- Children: Matt Hinton, Leanne Hinton
- Parent(s): Allan F. Hinton, Nell Duffie Hinton
- Website: http://www.samhinton.org

Sam Duffie Hinton (March 31, 1917 – September 10, 2009) was an American folk singer, marine biologist, photographer, and aquarist, best known for his music and harmonica playing. Hinton also taught at the University of California, San Diego, published books and magazine articles on marine biology, and worked as a calligrapher and artist.

== Biography ==
Sam Hinton was born March 31, 1917, in Tulsa, Oklahoma. He was raised largely in Crockett, Texas, and studied zoology for two years at Texas A&M, helping to finance his education via singing appearances. Leaving college, he moved to Washington, D.C., to stay with his parents, where he worked as a window decorator for a department store and did scientific illustration for the Smithsonian in the evenings. While in Washington he and his two sisters Ann and Nell formed a semi-professional singing group called "The Texas Trio," and performed locally. In 1937 the group visited New York City to win a Major Bowes' Amateur Hour competition, at which time he was invited to join the travelling Bowes troupe as a single act. Hinton left school to tour the country with the troupe, finally settling in Los Angeles three years later, where he enrolled at UCLA to study marine biology, and met his wife, Leslie. During his stay in Los Angeles, he landed a role in the musical comedy Meet the People alongside then-unknowns including Virginia O'Brien, Nanette Fabray, and Doodles Weaver. After graduating from UCLA in 1940, Hinton was appointed director of the Desert Museum in Palm Springs, California, where he served from 1942 to 1944, moving on to San Diego, California, in 1944 as Editor of Illustration at the University of California Division of War Research (UCDWR), a University of California-wide wartime laboratory that was located at Point Loma. In 1946 he was appointed Curator of the Thomas Wayland Vaughan Aquarium Museum at Scripps Institution of Oceanography, and served there until 1964. In 1965, Hinton transitioned to the University of California at San Diego as assistant director, Relations with Schools, and in 1967 he became associate director. Despite his professional duties, he continued performing throughout his life.

In 1947 Hinton recorded 56 songs, including "Buffalo Boy" and the "Barnyard Song" for the Library of Congress. His first commercial recording, "Old Man Atom" (by Vern Partlow) followed on Columbia in 1950. Over the next several years he also made a number of singles for Decca's Children's Series, and in 1952 issued his first LP, Folk Songs of California. After three more efforts for Decca – 1955's Singing Across the Land, 1956's A Family Tree of Folk Songs and 1957's The Real McCoy – he moved to Folkways for 1961's Whoever Shall Have Some Good Peanuts and 1967's The Wandering Folksong. None of Hinton's musical projects distracted him from his academic duties, however, and from 1948 onward he taught UCSD courses in biology and folklore; for the National Education Television network, he also hosted a 13-part series on folk music, and for several years even wrote a regular newspaper column, "The Ocean World," for the San Diego Union. Hinton additionally co-wrote two books on marine research, Exploring Under the Sea and Common Seashore Animals of Southern California.

In 1957, Hinton founded the San Diego Folk Song Society. He made what many contend was his final public appearance at the May 11, 2002, San Diego Folk Heritage Festival, and the daylong event at the Children's School in La Jolla was permanently renamed the Sam Hinton Folk Heritage Festival. As of 2015, San Diego Folk Heritage continues to present the festival every summer in Old Poway Park.

== Bibliography ==
Books

- Seashore Life of Southern California; an introduction to the animal life of California beaches south of Santa Barbara. University of California Press, 1969.
- Exploring under the sea. Illustrated by Rudolf Freund. Garden City, N.Y., Garden City Books, 1957.
- History of the Scripps institution of oceanography. Compiled by Sam D. Hinton. La Jolla, 1951.

Books illustrated by Hinton

- Raitt, Helen. Papers, 1936-1985 bulk 1952-1954, 1973-1976. (correspondence, notes, manuscripts, and other materials concerning the Capricorn Expedition, Tonga, and her work as owner and editor of Tofua Press.) Original illustrations by Hinton.
- Hedgpeth, Joel Walker, Common seashore life of southern California. Illustrated by Hinton. Edited by Vinson Brown. Healdsburg, Calif., Naturegraph Co., c1961.

== Discography ==
- Singing Across The Land, Decca DL-8108 (1955)
- Whoever Shall Have Some Good Peanuts, Folkways Records FC-7530 (1957)
- The Real McCoy: Irish Folk Songs, Decca DL-8579 (1958)
- A Family Tree Of Folk Songs, Decca Dl-8418 (1959)
- Sam Hinton Sings the Song of Men, Folkways Records FA-2400 (1961)
- The Wandering Folksong, Folkways Records FA-2401 (1966)
- I'll Sing You a Story, Folkways Records FC-7548 (1972)
- From an East Texas Childhood, SH Enterprises (1986)
- Of Frogs and Dogs and Such, SH Enterprises (1991)
- 'Tis the Season, SH Enterprises (1991)
- The Library of Congress Recordings, Bear Family Records BCD 16383 AH (1999, recorded in 1947)
- Sam Hinton: Master of the Solo Diatonic Harmonica, (2005)
