= WIPS (AM) =

- Ticonderoga, New York; United States
- Broadcast area: North Country, New York
- Frequency: 1250 kHz

Programming
- Format: Classic hits
- Affiliations: ABC Radio

Ownership
- Owner: Bisiblue, L.L.C.

History
- First air date: July 1955
- Last air date: October 30, 2009
- Call sign meaning: "We're International Paper's Station"

Technical information
- Facility ID: 468
- Class: D
- Power: 1,000 watts day; 85 watts night
- Transmitter coordinates: 43°51′16.2″N 73°23′22.4″W

WIPS (1250 AM) was a radio station broadcasting a classic hits format. Licensed in Ticonderoga, New York, United States, the station served mainly Essex County, New York, and Addison County, Vermont, from a transmitter site on Lake Champlain near Fort Ticonderoga. The station was owned by Bisiblue, L.L.C.

== History ==
WIPS started in July 1955 as an AM station located on Route 74 in Ticonderoga. The studio and its transmitter were both located on the shores of Lake Champlain. In 1981, a fire burned the original studios to the ground. Limestone Communications ran WIPS for a while, eventually adding an FM station on 103.9 MHz (WXTY, now WANC). While WIPS broadcast from sunrise to sunset originally, the station was later allowed to broadcast after sunset with 85 watts. After Bisiblue purchased the station, the WIPS studios were located in Crown Point, New York, 12 miles (19 km) from the original site. WIPS broadcast the Timeless Favorites format from ABC Radio.

After losing thousands of dollars per month, WIPS went silent on February 29, 2008. According to reporter Scott Fybush, WIPS went back on the air shortly before its license was scheduled to be deleted in April 2009. WIPS was eventually deleted two years later, on August 4, 2011, as Bisiblue, LLC asked to cancel the license; in its request, Bisiblue noted that the station had been silent since October 30, 2009, and that under federal law the WIPS license had effectively expired on October 30, 2010.

In January 2018, the WIPS name was reused by J. Walter Broadcasting (a company controlled by Robert Streeter) for a group of Internet radio stations, featuring six music formats and local news for Ticonderoga. However, the project failed six weeks after launch owing to financial mismanagement, and fraud. A criminal investigation into Robert Streeter and the WIPS operation was launched by the Ticonderoga Police Department.
