= David Guistina =

American television personality

David Guistina is the host of the Public, educational, and government access (PEG) cable TV quiz show Masterminds, aired on Time Warner Cable across New York State, and a producer and host at WAMC/Northeast Public Radio in Albany, New York.

He graduated from Utica College in 1991 with a dual major in public relations and communications after switching after approximately one year from a dual major in public relations and journalism. His minor was in radio/TV.

Guistina currently works as a producer and on-air personality for WAMC/Northeast Public Radio in Albany, New York. He produces several radio shows, documentaries and special programs. Guistina serves as the current host/newscaster of the locally produced segments of National Public Radio's Morning Edition, aired on WAMC from 5 a.m. to 9 a.m. on weekday mornings (previous hosts include Brian Shields and Alan Doane). In the local WAMC Morning Edition segments, Guistina reads local news stories and interviews reporters. He also serves as substitute co-host of The Roundtable, WAMC's local 9 a.m. to 12 p.m. morning program, when Joe Donahue or Sarah LaDuke is on vacation. In addition, he is the Internship Coordinator for the station. He has taught Interpersonal communication classes at Utica College for more than ten years as well as a journalism class at the SUNY University at Albany.
