= Judith S. Bloch =

American activist

Judith S. Bloch (Judith Simon Bloch) was an LCSW and activist in the field of early childhood education. She was an advocate for national public policy and changes that addressed the needs of children with developmental disabilities and their families. She was among the first professionals in the United States to recognize and promote the value of early intervention for children with special needs. She is the founder of Variety Child Learning Center (VCLC), in Syosset, New York, a private, not-for-profit 501(c)(3)agency that provides education and therapeutic services and support to young children with special needs, and their families, along with training for professionals.

== Career ==
After receiving her master's degree in Social Work from Columbia University, Judith began her work with young children who had developmental delays and learning disabilities. During her training and early work with children, Judith recognized the value of early intervention and collaborating with parents. These ideas, integral to the way in which children with special needs are educated today, planted the seeds for The Home School Collaborative Model (HSCM), an educational model that has been implemented by New York State.

In 1966, Bloch established Variety Child Learning Center (VCLC) one of the first special education preschools in the nation for children with learning, language and behavior problems, including autism, that included programs and support for families. Bloch oversaw every step of the school's expansion and growth, from its one classroom beginning, as Pre-Schooler's Workshop in Garden City, New York, to the move to the current location in Syosset as Variety Child Learning Center to the current full-service Variety Child Learning Center the agency is today.

Each year, VCLC provides special education, evaluations, early intervention, therapeutic services and support, respite, recreational and enrichment programs to thousands of children with developmental disabilities, including autism, and their families, on- and off-site. VCLC also provides professional development workshops and training, and collaborates with Winthrop University Hospital Pediatric Residency Program, providing pediatric residents with invaluable learning experiences.

In 1997, Bloch's educational model, The Home School Collaborative Model(HSCM)was awarded as a “Sharing Success Validated Program” by New York State and, VCLC was designated a training site and “Developer/ Demonstrator" for the state.

Featured at national and international professional conferences in Sweden, England, Russia, Budapest, Prague, Chicago, Atlanta, New York and Washington DC, Bloch has presented on child development practices and trends including her acclaimed [Home/School Collaborative Model (HSCM)] and The Five P's (Parent/Professional Preschool Performance Profile) System.

Judith Bloch was chief executive officer (CEO) of Variety Child Learning Center since founding the school in 1966 until her retirement in December 2012. During her tenure as CEO, Bloch promoted the value of early identification and intervention and advocated for entitlements to children and families.

== Works ==
Numerous teaching/training films, created and produced by Judith, are featured at major Universities and learning centers for development and sensitization training. A prolific writer, her work frequently appears in both professional and popular publications.

Her films include:

- A Time for Georgia
- Parents Talk
- Jennifer is a Lady
- Teaching Children Self Control
- The Five P's Partnership: Transforming Educational Goals into Realities
- The New Survivors

"I think the most important thing I've done is (to) start a program for young children who had been neglected, denied opportunity to learn, to become part of the social mainstream. In addition to the school's support services for families, I've been an advocate and, more recently, focused on research to demonstrate the value of early intervention, not only to children and their families, but to the community. And not only in terms of values-children are our most precious resource. With early intervention, we can promote development and effect changes that may not be possible if we delay or provide services too late."

— Judith S. Bloch, Distinction Magazine, 1999

== Awards ==
Bloch has been the recipient of numerous awards and citations. In July 2008, VCLC & Judith Bloch were inducted into Thirteen/WNET New York & WLIW21's Community Hall of Fame. She was named in the Long Island Business News Top 50 Women in Business, in 2005, the New York State Senate Women of Distinction Award (2000, 1998), the National Association of Social Workers New York State Chapter Lifetime Achievement Award (1999), and the Long Island Socially Responsible Entrepreneur of the Year Award (1994).

In June, 2009, the Board of Trustees of Variety Child Learning Center (VCLC) named the center-based school at Variety Child Learning Center in Syosset, NY, "The Judith S. Bloch School", to honor her life's achievements.

== Personal life ==
Judith S Bloch died on June 15, 2015, surrounded by her loving family, husband Dr. Milton Bloch and daughters, Natalie Bloch Langner and Susan Bloch LeachNewsday. She was 86. She was survived by her husband Milton Bloch, DDS, her three daughters, and seven grandchildren.

Judith enjoyed the arts, music, folk dancing, travel and spending time with her family and friends.

== See also ==
- Human rights education
