= Alan S. Chartock =

American radio personality and executive (born 1941)

- Born: July 25, 1941 (age 85)
- Occupations: CEO, WAMC
- Spouse: Roselle Chartock

Alan Seth Chartock (born July 25, 1941) is a former president and chief executive officer of WAMC/Northeast Public Radio, a National Public Radio affiliate, from 1981 to 2023. He was professor of political science at SUNY New Paltz and is a professor emeritus of communications at the State University of New York (SUNY), and is executive publisher and project director for the Legislative Gazette, a weekly newspaper staffed by college intern reporters covering New York State government.

Chartock served in a variety of on-air roles at WAMC, including but not limited to hosting the Capitol Connection, Vox Pop, and Conversations with programs, sitting on panels for The Roundtable and The Media Project, serving as a political commentator, and filling a central role in the thrice-annual fund drives. He also writes a syndicated column on politics which appears in newspapers throughout New York state.

== Background ==
Born in New York City, Chartock worked in the state legislature for Senator Manfred Ohrenstein. He attended the New Lincoln School, graduated from Rhodes High School. Chartock is a graduate of Hunter College, received a master of arts from American University, and a doctorate from New York University. He is married to Dr. Roselle K. Chartock, an author and professor of education at Massachusetts College of Liberal Arts in North Adams. They reside in Great Barrington, Massachusetts and have two grown children, Dr. Jonas S. Chartock and Dr. Sarah R. Chartock.

Chartock is of European Jewish descent.

== Radio personality ==
Chartock participated in a broad swath of WAMC's radio programs, serving as host of the Capitol Connection, Legislative Gazette, and Congressional Corner; appearing on the Media Project; and being interviewed as the "political observer" at WAMC on a number of the on station, including as The Roundtable, Midday Magazine, and Northeast Report. Chartock also hosted morning portions of on-air fund drives.

Chartock's presence on the air was increased after retiring from a full-time position teaching at SUNY Albany.

Chartock's retirement was announced on May 25, 2023.

== Awards ==
Chartock has won numerous awards at SUNY, including the Chancellor's Award for Excellence in Teaching and the SUNY Council of University Affairs and Development Award for Educational achievement. He was one of the first recipients of the SUNY Award for Excellence. In 2007, Chartock was chosen to receive the 2006 Alumni Association Award for Distinguished Teacher from the SUNY New Paltz Alumni Association.

He is the recipient of an honorary doctorate for public service from the Sage Colleges and an Honorary Doctorate of Humane Letters from Western New England College and Westfield State College.

== Views of WAMC news and political commentary ==
=== Chartock's political views ===
Chartock says he is concerned about governmental restrictions on free speech. He is dismayed by what he calls the proliferation of corporate-run radio stations, which he believes express extreme right-wing views without giving opposing viewpoints. He has called Pete Seeger "an American hero".

According to Gadi Dechter of CityPaper.com, Chartock "publishes a blog on WAMC's web site that has featured sharp attacks on the Republican party, the Bush administration, and 'neocons' in general."

=== Support for Chartock's programming ===
Stephen Yasko, manager of WTMD (89.7 FM), an NPR member station in Towson, Maryland which plays mostly adult-alternative music, contends that any quality-control challenges which might be created by NPR's decentralized nature are outweighed by the advantage of unique local programming.

"Public radio stations reflect the values and texture of the communities they serve," says Yasko, who has also worked in the NPR member services department. "If NPR or any national organization had too much control or input into every station's local personality, then you would lose the very thing that makes us what we are. So if Alan Chartock is what Albany and upstate New York created and what works for them, that's a beautiful thing, no matter what some outsiders might say."

Under Chartock's leadership, WAMC grew into a network of 14 stations (all broadcasting identical programming) and a web-based platform serving portions of seven New England and Middle Atlantic states, bringing news, information and cultural programming to what station leaders claim is an audience of nearly 400,000 monthly listeners. The station's thrice-yearly fund drives have a goal of $1 million each as of 2013.

== Departure from WAMC ==
In May 2023, the station announced that Chartock was retiring effective immediately. His departure was announced after the then-81-year-old had taken time off earlier in the week to consider ending his career and after his on-air time had been reduced, station officials told the Albany Times Union Chartock's resignation came just months after the station's board of trustees decided to boost his base salary by more than $100,000—a move that brought his base compensation to roughly $350,000 a year.

== Books ==
- Chartock, Alan S. (1995). Me and Mario Cuomo: Conversations in Candor. New York: Barricade Books. ISBN 1-56980-062-6. OCLC 32780547.
- Chartock, Alan S. (1974). The Midtown Project. New York: (Publisher unknown). (ISBN unknown).
- Chartock, Alan S. (1970). Strengthening the Wisconsin Legislature. An Eagleton Study and Report. New Brunswick, N.J.: Published for the Eagleton Institute of Politics by Rutgers University Press. ISBN 0-8135-0612-3. OCLC 105308.
