= Lawrence C. Levy =

American academic and journalist

- Born: 1950 (age 75–76)
- Other name: Larry Levy
- Education: Boston University's School of Communication (B.S. 1972)
- Occupations: academic and journalist
- Employer: National Center for Suburban Studies at Hofstra University
- Known for: finalist for the Pulitzer Prize for Editorial Writing; Long Island Journalism Hall of Fame
- Title: executive dean

Lawrence C. "Larry" Levy (born 1950) is the executive dean of the National Center for Suburban Studies at Hofstra University, as well as a former journalist. He is an expert on suburban politics. In 1999, he was a finalist for the Pulitzer Prize for Editorial Writing. In 2023 Levy was inducted into the Long Island Journalism Hall of Fame.

== Biography ==
=== Early life ===
Levy was born in 1950, and is the son of Celia "Cyl" and Saul S. Levy. He has a sister Mara Kahn. He grew up in Valley Stream, New York. He is married to Freda Wagner, and has two sons, David and Sam. As of 2009, he lived in Huntington, New York.

He attended Boston University's School of Communication (B.S. 1972), where Levy majored in Journalism, Film & English Literature. Levy was a starting pitcher on the school baseball team.

=== Career ===
Levy worked as a reporter, chief political columnist, and senior editorial writer at Newsday from 1977 to 2007. He has also served as the host of "Face-Off", a weekly public affairs show on WLIW.

In 1999, he was a finalist for the Pulitzer Prize for Editorial Writing, for his writing that was key in prompting reform of the inequities in Long Island's system of property assessment. He has written guest posts for CNN and The New York Times, and written a regular column on politics for the Albany Times Union. He has appeared as a guest on WCNY-FM, Innovation Hub, WNYC, and others. Levy is a member of a Brookings Institution advisory panel.

Levy has since 2007 been the executive dean of the National Center for Suburban Studies at Hofstra University, as well as a former journalist.

In 2008, he was named 47th on the 6th Annual Power List of the Long Island Press.

Levy was honored as the 2022 Educator of the Year by the Long Island Black Educators Association (LIBEA).

Speaking in 2023 about attitudes of people on Long Island, Levy said: "Suburbanites are all about personal security — as it’s reflected in crime, as it’s reflected in their finances — and when they are starting to feel threatened with the steady drumbeat of bloody headlines and lead stories, they take notice. And even if they don’t see much of it happening around them, they’re worried that it could find them."

In 2023 Levy was inducted into the Long Island Journalism Hall of Fame.

He is an expert on suburban politics.
