= WAMC =

Public radio network based in Albany, New York

WAMC-FM
- Albany, New York; United States
- Broadcast area: Capital District
- Frequency: 90.3 MHz (HD Radio)
- Branding: WAMC, Northeast Public Radio

Programming
- Format: Public radio and talk
- Subchannels: HD2: Alternate public radio programs
- Affiliations: NPR; APM; BBC World Service; PRX

Ownership
- Owner: WAMC

History
- First air date: October 1958
- Call sign meaning: Albany Medical College (original owner)

Technical information
- Licensing authority: FCC
- Facility ID: 70849
- Class: B
- ERP: 10,000 watts
- HAAT: 600 meters (2,000 ft)
- Transmitter coordinates: 42°38′14.3″N 73°10′5.4″W
- Translator: See § Translators
- Repeater: See § Repeaters

Links
- Public license information: Public file; LMS
- Webcast: Listen live
- Website: www.wamc.org

WAMC-FM (90.3 FM) is a listener-supported non-commercial radio station in Albany, New York. It airs a public radio format focusing on news and talk with some specialty music shows on weekends. Owned by "WAMC Northeast Public Radio", it has its studios on Central Avenue in Albany and its transmitter is atop Mount Greylock in Adams, Massachusetts. Its primary signal encompasses the Capital District, Eastern New York State, Southern Vermont, Western Massachusetts and the Litchfield Hills region of Connecticut. It is a member station of National Public Radio (NPR), American Public Media, Public Radio Exchange and carries the BBC World Service overnight.

Unlike many NPR stations which largely air network programming, five to six hours of WAMC's weekday schedule are produced in-house. WAMC is a charitable, educational, non-commercial broadcaster meeting the requirements of Section 501(c)(3) of the Internal Revenue Code (26 U.S.C. §501(c)(3)) The station operates The Linda, WAMC's Performing Arts Studio, near its studios in Albany.

Dottie Reyonolds chairs WAMC's board of trustees, while Sarah Gilbert is the station's CEO and president. Gilbert succeeded Alan Chartock, who retired in 2023 after leading the station for more than 40 years.

== History ==
=== Albany Medical Center ===
WAMC signed on the air in October 1958. Albert P. Fredette served as the first general manager. WAMC was put on the air by the local hospital and medical school, Albany Medical Center and Albany Medical College. Albany Medical Center is a large tertiary-care hospital serving the upper Hudson Valley, and the medical school is one of the country's ACGME-accredited medical schools. The affiliation with Albany Medical College was the source of the call sign WAMC. In 1981, the station became an independent institution, no longer associated with the medical school.

In its early days, WAMC had a mostly classical music radio format. The earliest years also included broadcasts of health information and lectures from visiting medical professors. Early on, part of WAMC's regular programming was the broadcast of live concerts by the Boston Symphony Orchestra (BSO) from Tanglewood and Boston. When the NPR network was founded in 1970, WAMC became one of NPR's original 90 "charter" members.

=== Separating from the medical school ===
Around 1980, financial pressures caused the hospital and medical school to begin divesting the station. In 1981, the Federal Communications Commission (FCC) license on 90.3 FM was transferred to a 501c3 tax-exempt entity, WAMC, Inc., which had been set up by a group of five corporators, including Alan S. Chartock, who became longtime CEO and President, until his retirement in 2023. WAMC was initially affiliated with the State University of New York and New York State government.

In the years since the transfer, the station has eliminated classical music, except for live BSO concerts. It has become a producer of information-based, non-music programming, providing a variety of interview-format programs to radio stations across the country via the station's in-house subsidiary, National Productions. (WMHT-FM in nearby Schenectady and its network of repeater stations continues to program classical music in the region.)

=== Expanding the network ===
Listener contributions (often obtained during periodic pledge drives) and corporate contributions have helped the original single station grow over the years into a network of 22 facilities with large primary service contours covering the Capital District, the Adirondacks section of New York, the outer northern suburbs of New York City, Western Massachusetts, Southern Vermont, and parts of New Hampshire, Connecticut, Pennsylvania and New Jersey.

It has been a custom on WAMC to play two songs to mark the end of every fund drive: Kate Smith's "God Bless America" and Ray Charles' rendition of "America the Beautiful". The station's February 2017 fund drive raised over $1,000,000 in less than one day.

The main 90.3 MHz signal has an effective radiated power (ERP) of 10,000 watts, which on paper is somewhat modest for a full NPR member on the FM band. However, its height above average terrain (HAAT) of 600 meters (2,000 ft) gives it one of the largest coverage areas of any NPR station in the Northeast. It provides at least grade B coverage to most of east-central New York (including the Capital District), southwestern Vermont, western Massachusetts, southwestern New Hampshire, and northwestern Connecticut.

=== Mount Greylock ===
While WAMC-FM is based in Albany, its transmitter is actually in Massachusetts. WAMC-FM's antenna tower is atop Mount Greylock in Adams, in the Mount Greylock State Reservation. It is the tallest mountain in Massachusetts. The transmitter had formerly been a tenant on the tower, which was built and maintained by the Albany ABC-TV affiliate WTEN (channel 10) for its satellite station for the Berkshire region and Pittsfield, WCDC (channel 19). The tower also features a radio facility for the Massachusetts State Police and a translator station for the Albany NBC affiliate, WNYT (channel 13).

On December 22, 2017, WAMC entered into an agreement to purchase the Mount Greylock WCDC transmitter and tower from the owner of WTEN/WCDC, Nexstar Media Group, for just above $1 million. WCDC-TV had gone permanently silent on November 19, 2017, two weeks ahead of a planned December 1 shutdown amid declining over-the-air viewership, following damage to the station's transmission line in a storm. The TV station license was surrendered for cancellation on February 12, 2018, as a result of the FCC's 2016 spectrum auction for $34.5 million in compensation. Due to the tower sitting on Massachusetts Department of Conservation and Recreation (MDCR) land, as well as WTEN's lease on the land having expired two years prior, WAMC-FM could have been taken off the air if it had not purchased the facility. WAMC now owns the tower itself, but not the land beneath, which is under lease with the MDCR until 2025.

=== Accusations of bias ===
NPR's official news policy says its affiliate stations should be "fair, unbiased, accurate, honest, and respectful of the people that are covered". A Washington-based NPR news producer, who requested anonymity, stated that Chartock, the station's then-president and a frequently heard voice on the station, presented politically biased commentary.

Chartock responded that WAMC's editorial neutrality is maintained by "including as many conservative commentators on the air as liberal ones".

=== First Amendment Fund ===
In 2005, WAMC's board of trustees established a "First Amendment Fund" to promote and preserve the First Amendment and the right of free speech by providing a source of funding "to support WAMC if special situations or needs should arise". The contributions in this "unrestricted, board designated" fund reported on WAMC's 2006 IRS tax forms was $482,577.

=== Syndicated programs ===
WAMC syndicates many of its shows to other public radio stations. These programs include

- Legislative Gazette about NY State politics
- The Capitol Connection about NY State politics
- Women's news show 51% with Jesse King
- Environmental news show Earth Wise
- Person Place Thing with Randy Cohen
- The Academic Minute with Lynn Pasquerella
- Ideas show The Best of Our Knowledge with Lucas Willard (not to be confused with To the Best of Our Knowledge syndicated by Wisconsin Public Radio)
- Author interview program The Book Show with Joe Donahue
- Media criticism show The Media Project

== WAMC Northeast Public Radio Network ==
WAMC-FM's reach is extended into parts of New York State, Vermont, Massachusetts, Connecticut, Northeastern Pennsylvania and the Monadnock Region, Champlain Valley, Skylands Region and North Country areas, along with portions of Quebec, via a network of twelve full-power repeaters and sixteen low-power translators. One of these satellite stations operates on the AM band, WAMC (1400 AM) in Albany.

=== Repeaters ===
| Call sign | Frequency | City of license | FID | Power (W) | ERP (W) | HAAT | Class | Transmitter coordinates | FCC info |
|---|---|---|---|---|---|---|---|---|---|
| WAMC | 1400 AM | Albany, NY | 4683 | 1,000 | — | — | C | 42°41′21.28″N 73°47′35.44″W | LMS |
| WAMK | 90.9 FM | Kingston, NY | 70502 | — | 940 | 453 m (1,486 ft) | B1 | 42°4′35.3″N 74°6′24.5″W | LMS |
| WAMQ | 105.1 FM | Great Barrington, MA | 70847 | — | 730 | 280 m (920 ft) | A | 42°9′36.3″N 73°28′46.4″W | LMS |
| WANC | 103.9 FM | Ticonderoga, NY | 70842 | — | 1,550 | 116 m (381 ft) | A | 43°49′55.2″N 73°24′26.4″W | LMS |
| WANR | 88.5 FM | Brewster, NY | 174780 | — | 235 | 44 m (144 ft) | A | 41°23′4.3″N 73°31′55.4″W | LMS |
| WANZ | 90.1 FM | Stamford, NY | 176616 | — | 230 | −103 m (−338 ft) | A | 42°22′10.2″N 74°39′52.5″W | LMS |
| WCAN | 93.3 FM | Canajoharie, NY | 70503 | — | 6,000 | 82 m (269 ft) | A | 42°53′46.2″N 74°35′43.5″W | LMS |
| WCEL | 91.9 FM | Plattsburgh, NY | 44032 | — | 380 | 260 m (850 ft) | A | 44°46′27.1″N 73°36′46.5″W | LMS |
| WOSR | 91.7 FM | Middletown, NY | 70848 | — | 1,800 | 192 m (630 ft) | B1 | 41°36′4.3″N 74°33′15.5″W | LMS |
| WQQQ | 103.3 FM | Sharon, CT | 54785 | — | 1,500 | 186 m (610 ft) | A | 41°55′8.3″N 73°34′20.4″W | LMS |
| WRUN | 90.3 FM | Remsen, NY | 87836 | — | 1,200 | 204 m (669 ft) | B | 43°20′48″N 75°13′57.4″W | LMS |
| WWES | 88.9 FM | Mount Kisco, NY | 176621 | — | 400 | 19 m (62 ft) | A | 41°14′46″N 73°40′31″W | LMS |

=== Translators ===
| Call sign | Frequency | City of license | FID | ERP (W) | HAAT | Transmitter coordinates | FCC info | Relays |
|---|---|---|---|---|---|---|---|---|
| W204CJ | 88.7 FM | Lake Placid, NY | 66421 | 13 | −20 m (−66 ft) | 44°17′31.9″N 73°59′23″W | LMS | WAMC-FM |
| W211CE | 90.1 FM | Oneonta, NY | 70845 | 250 | 4.5 m (15 ft) | 42°27′23.2″N 75°4′35.5″W | LMS | WAMC-FM |
| W215BG | 90.9 FM | Milford, PA | 92758 | 10 | 76.37 m (250.6 ft) | 41°22′23″N 74°43′47.9″W | LMS | WOSR |
| W225BM | 92.9 FM | Scotia, NY | 147781 | 10 | 203.7 m (668 ft) | 42°51′0.2″N 74°3′55.4″W | LMS | WAMC-FM |
| W226AC | 93.1 FM | Troy, NY | 70843 | 250 | 165.05 m (541.5 ft) | 42°47′9.2″N 73°37′41.4″W | LMS | WAMC-FM |
| W240CR | 95.9 FM | Peekskill, NY | 147798 | 10 | 80.2 m (263 ft) | 41°20′18.3″N 73°53′39.5″W | LMS | WOSR |
| W243BZ | 96.5 FM | Ellenville, NY | 141863 | 6.5 | 470 m (1,540 ft) | 41°41′1.3″N 74°21′22.6″W | LMS | WOSR |
| W246BJ | 97.1 FM | Hudson, NY | 147822 | 200 | −77.44 m (−254.1 ft) | 42°15′17.3″N 73°46′34.4″W | LMS | WAMC-FM |
| W247BM | 97.3 FM | Cooperstown, NY | 140147 | 10 | −478.51 m (−1,569.9 ft) | 42°40′44.3″N 74°53′57.6″W | LMS | WCAN |
| W257BL | 99.3 FM | Oneonta, NY | 157957 | 250 | 22.1 m (73 ft) | 42°27′23.2″N 75°4′35.5″W | LMS | WCAN |
| W271BF | 102.1 FM | Highland, NY | 147233 | 10 | 256.42 m (841.3 ft) | 41°43′10.3″N 73°59′43.5″W | LMS | WAMK |
| W280DJ | 103.9 FM | Beacon, NY | 147411 | 10 | 321.79 m (1,055.7 ft) | 41°29′20.2″N 73°56′51.2″W | LMS | WAMK |
| W292DX | 106.3 FM | Middletown, NY | 46502 | 99 | 28.2 m (93 ft) | 41°27′16.3″N 74°25′4.5″W | LMS | WOSR |
| W292ES | 106.3 FM | Dover Plains, NY | 147759 | 10 | 188.68 m (619.0 ft) | 41°42′50.3″N 73°32′5.4″W | LMS | WAMK |
| W296BD | 107.1 FM | Warwick, NY | 156156 | 10 | 115.9 m (380 ft) | 41°16′51.3″N 74°21′44.6″W | LMS | WOSR |
| W299AG | 107.7 FM | Newburgh, NY | 70850 | 10 | 113.65 m (372.9 ft) | 41°25′21.3″N 74°0′40.5″W | LMS | WAMK |

== See also ==
- David Guistina

== General Reference ==
- WAMC Northeast Public Radio Records, 1980-2000. M.E. Grenander Department of Special Collections and Archives, University Libraries, University at Albany, State University of New York (hereafter referred to as the WAMC Records).
