= Long Islander Newspapers =

Long Islander Newspapers is a chain of weekly newspapers covering the town of Huntington, New York.

Currently, Long Islander Newspapers publishes three local newspapers:

- Half Hollow Hills, which covers Dix Hills and Melville
- The Record, which covers Northport, East Northport, Elwood, Asharoken, Eaton's Neck and half of Fort Salonga and Commack.
- The Long Islander which covers Huntington, Huntington Station, Greenlawn, Centerport, Huntington Bay, Cold Spring Harbor and Lloyd Harbor. This publication was founded by renowned poet Walt Whitman in 1838.

Defunct publications: The Northport Journal, which was an arts and culture publication that borrowed some material from the other papers.

== Sales ==
All three major papers are available for subscription, but only The Record and The Long Islander can be purchased in local stores. Although The Long Islander covers the largest chunk of the Town, Half Hollow Hills commands the highest subscription rate at 10,000. The Record has 2,270 subscribers, while the company's namesake publication has 5,578 subscribers.

Long Islanders Newspapers' office is located on Wall Street in Huntington village.
