= The Crest (Huntington, New York) =

Historic house in New York, United States

- U.S. National Register of Historic Places
- Oakley R. DeLamater Estate, The Crest, 1910

- Location within New York Location within the United States
- Location: 563 Asharoken Ave., Eatons Neck, New York
- Coordinates: 40°56′22″N 73°23′9″W
- Area: 5.2 acres (2.1 ha)
- Built: 1902
- Architects: Donnell, Harry E.
- Architectural style: Tudor Revival
- MPS: Huntington Town MRA
- NRHP reference No.: 85003645; 100008116 (decrease)

Significant dates
- Added to NRHP: October 3, 2007
- Boundary decrease: September 9, 2022

The Crest is a historic house on Eatons Neck in Suffolk County, New York. Although on the land mass of Eatons Neck, the house today is within the jurisdiction of the Incorporated Village of Asharoken. According to the National Register of Historic Places, on which the house is listed, it has also been known as Hasbrouk-DeLamater House and as Robinson House. Another name for the house is Walnut Crest.

Back view of Oakley R. DeLamater Mansion "the Crest" in Eaton's Neck, NY circa 1925

The house was built in 1902 for Oakley Ramshon DeLamater who presented the house as a gift to his wife, Elizabeth Hasbrouk DeLamater. Oakley R. DeLamater was the grandson of Cornelius H. DeLamater, who owned the DeLamater Iron Works located where 13th Street meets the Hudson River in New York City. The ironworks is where the turret and machinery was built for the ironclad USS Monitor during the Civil War. The estate, originally named "Walnut Crest" was built on a high crest of land overlooking Walnut Neck. Walnut Neck is a peninsula on the south side of Eatons Neck.

Oakley R. DeLamater, Jr. and wife at the Crest, 1929

The house was designed by Harry E. Donnell, who was married to another grandchild of Cornelius H. DeLamater.

It was listed on the National Register of Historic Places in 2007.
