= Oak Leaf =

Oak leaf or Oakleaf may refer to:

== Biology ==
- the leaf of an oak
- oak leaf lettuce, from the Lactuca sativa group
- Any member of the butterfly genus Kallima
  - The species Kallima knyvetti

== Military ==
- Oak leaf cluster, a U.S. military decoration
- A bronze oak leaf device, used to signify a Mention in Despatches in Commonwealth militaries
- A silver oak leaf device, used to signify the award of the King's Commendation for Valuable Service in Commonwealth militaries
- Oak leaves awarded to holders of some categories of the German Iron Cross and the Knight's Cross of the Iron Cross
- Golden oak leaf, insignia of rank of Major (United States)
- Golden oak leaf, insignia of rank of Lieutenant commander (United States)
- Silver oak leaf, insignia of rank of Commander (United States)
- Silver oak leaf, insignia of rank of Lieutenant colonel (United States)
- Golden oak leaf, insignia of the United States Navy Supply Corps

== Geography ==
- County Londonderry, Northern Ireland, nicknamed 'the Oak Leaf County'
- Oak Leaf, Texas, a city
- Oakleaf Lake, a lake in Minnesota

== Others ==
- RFA Oakleaf, Royal Fleet Auxiliary ship names
- Oakleaf Brewery, a brewery in England
- Oak Leaf (house), a historic home in New York
