= Vernon Valley, New York =

- Hamlet
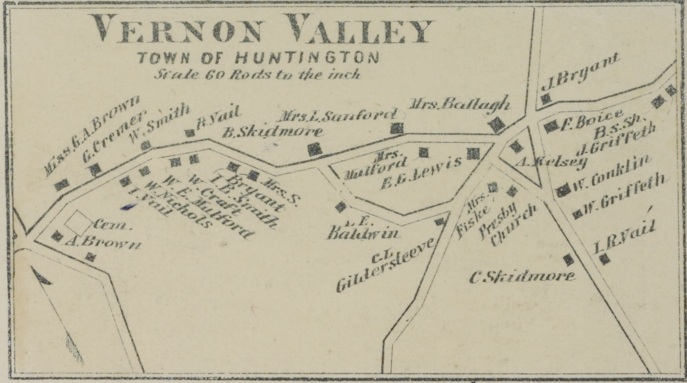
- 1873 Beers map showing Vernon Valley
- Interactive map of Vernon Valley, New York
- Coordinates: 40°53′58″N 73°19′43″W
- Country: United States
- State: New York
- County: Suffolk
- Township: Huntington
- Elevation: 79 ft (24 m)
- Time zone: UTC-5 (EST)
  - Summer (DST): UTC-4 (EDT)
- ZIP code: 11768
- Area code: 631
- GNIS feature ID: 968499

Vernon Valley was a hamlet located in the Town of Huntington in Suffolk County, Long Island, New York, United States. It is located at the southeast corner of the incorporated Village of Northport, and is in the Northport postal zone, and is within the census-designated place of East Northport. Its separate identity has dissolved through the post World War II suburban growth of Long Island.

== History ==
The location was originally known as "Red Hook", and started when a group of 31 families settled east of Northport around the time of the American Revolutionary War. It was centered on what is now the intersection of NYS Route 25A, Main Street, Waterside Avenue, and Vernon Valley Road. It changed names to "Vernon Valley" in 1820.

In his 1874 history of Suffolk County, Richard Mather Bayles wrote that "Vernon Valley is a pleasant little farming district containing perhaps one hundred and fifty inhabitants located about two miles east of Northport, to which it is a sort of tributary. It was formerly called Red Hook. It contains a Presbyterian church and a school. The church was built here in 1829, having been removed from Fresh Pond its former site."

When the village of Northport was incorporated in the late 1800s, the northwest quadrant of the area fell within the new village limits.

The name is or was more generally applied to the entire hollow (or valley) that runs south from this point for approximately 1.5 miles to East Northport. Not coincidentally, the thoroughfare is named "Vernon Valley Road." The building which is now known as the St. Paul's Lutheran School, located near the southern terminus, was originally built as The Vernon Valley Inn. With the demise of that business (due to a fire in 1966), the last reference other than the local street passed from common usage.

Vernon Valley has been recognized in state and federal censuses in some years. In the 1855 New York Census, it was listed as a village with a population of 100. In the 1960 U.S. Census, Vernon Valley was listed as an unincorporated community with a population of 5,998. And in the 1970 census, it had a listed population of 7,925. It was no longer listed starting with the 1980 census.
