= Harry E. Donnell =

American architect (1867–1959)

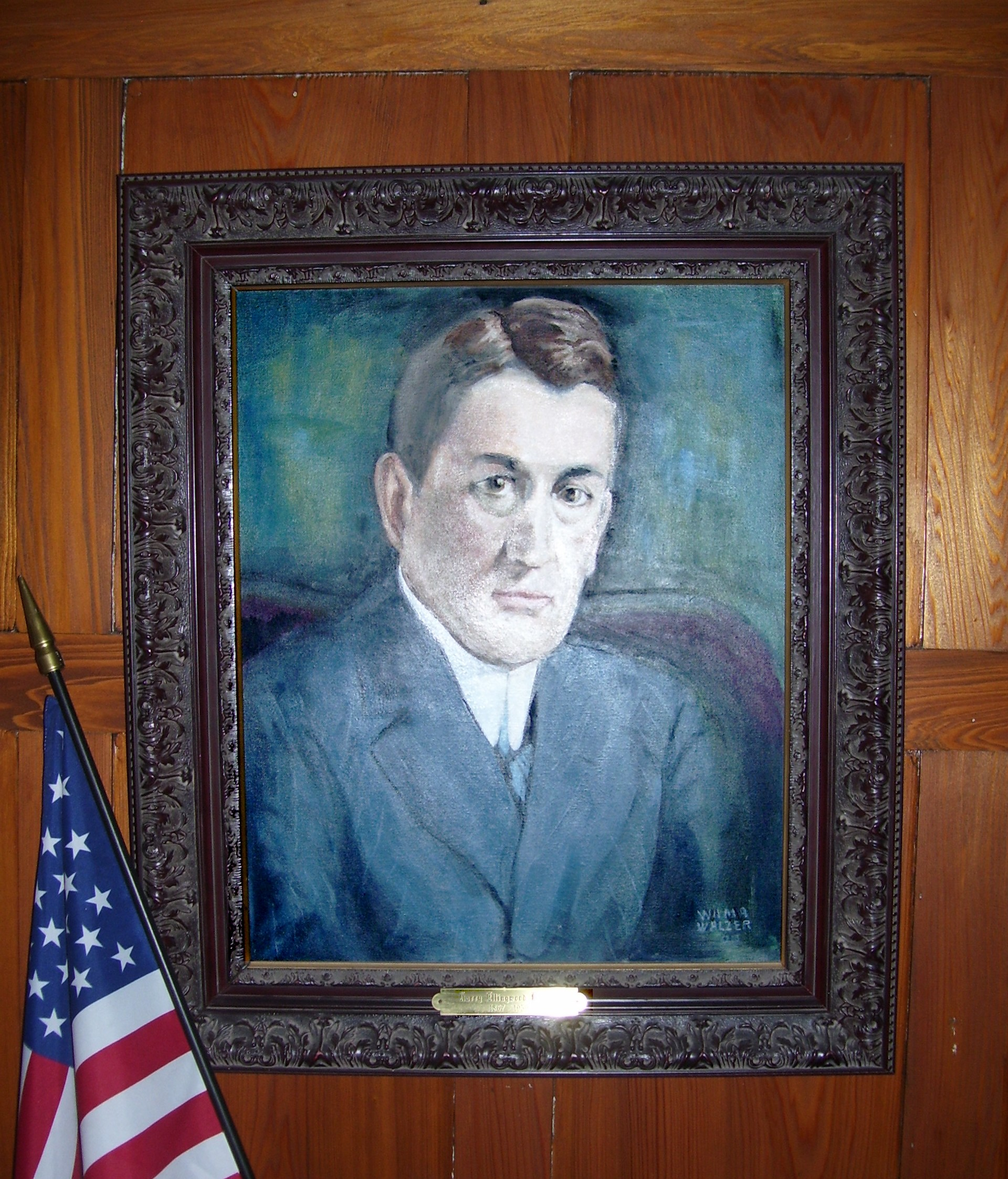
Harry Ellingwood Donnell

Harry Ellingwood Donnell (May 2, 1867 – February 25, 1959) was an American Beaux-Arts architect who designed many commercial and residential structures in New York City and Long Island between 1894 and 1915.

== Biography ==
Donnell (don-Nell) was born in Portland, Maine. The Donnell family moved to New York City in 1875. Donnell graduated from City College of New York in 1886 and the Columbia School of Mines in 1887. In 1890, he was hired by architect Richard Morris Hunt to serve as the superintending architect for the construction of the U.S. Naval Observatory in Washington, D.C. Today, this includes buildings such as the one housing the "master clock" for U.S timekeeping, and the U.S. Vice President's residence.

Donnell attended the Ecole des Beaux-Arts in Paris, entering in 1893 and returning to the United States in 1894. He entered into partnership with another Beaux-Arts architect Francis Kimball in 1895. Their firm designed many buildings in lower Manhattan, including 111 Fifth Avenue and the Brunswick Building at 225 Fifth Avenue. From 1900 to 1915, Donnell designed numerous residential homes on the North Shore of Long Island, including community libraries such as the Carnegie Library in Northport, New York.

In 1915, his father-in-law offered Donnell the opportunity to own and manage one of the family's Long Island companies, the S.S. Hepworth Machine Company, the largest manufacturer of rotating milling machines for the sugar cane industry. Donnell spent the remainder of his life as the Chief Executive Officer of Hepworth, utilizing his architectural skills only as a pastime.

Donnell married Ruth Attmore Robinson (1870–1949). They lived in New York City and also maintained a country home on 200 acres (0.81 km^{2}) on Eatons Neck, New York, known as "The Hill". In 1927, the estate was subdivided into 3- and 4-acre parcels, and the Eaton Harbors Corporation was formed to own and maintain the private roads and bathing beaches for the common use of new owners. Donnell was the corporation's president from 1927 to 1950.

From 1907 to 1921 Donnell served as sole trustee of the Eaton's Neck School District. The District was merged with other surrounding school districts to form the Northport-East Northport Union Free School District in 1922.

Donnell died in New York City on 25 February 1959.

== See also ==
- The Grand Madison, Manhattan, New York
- The Crest, Huntington, New York
