= Oak Leaf (house) =

Historic house in New York, United States

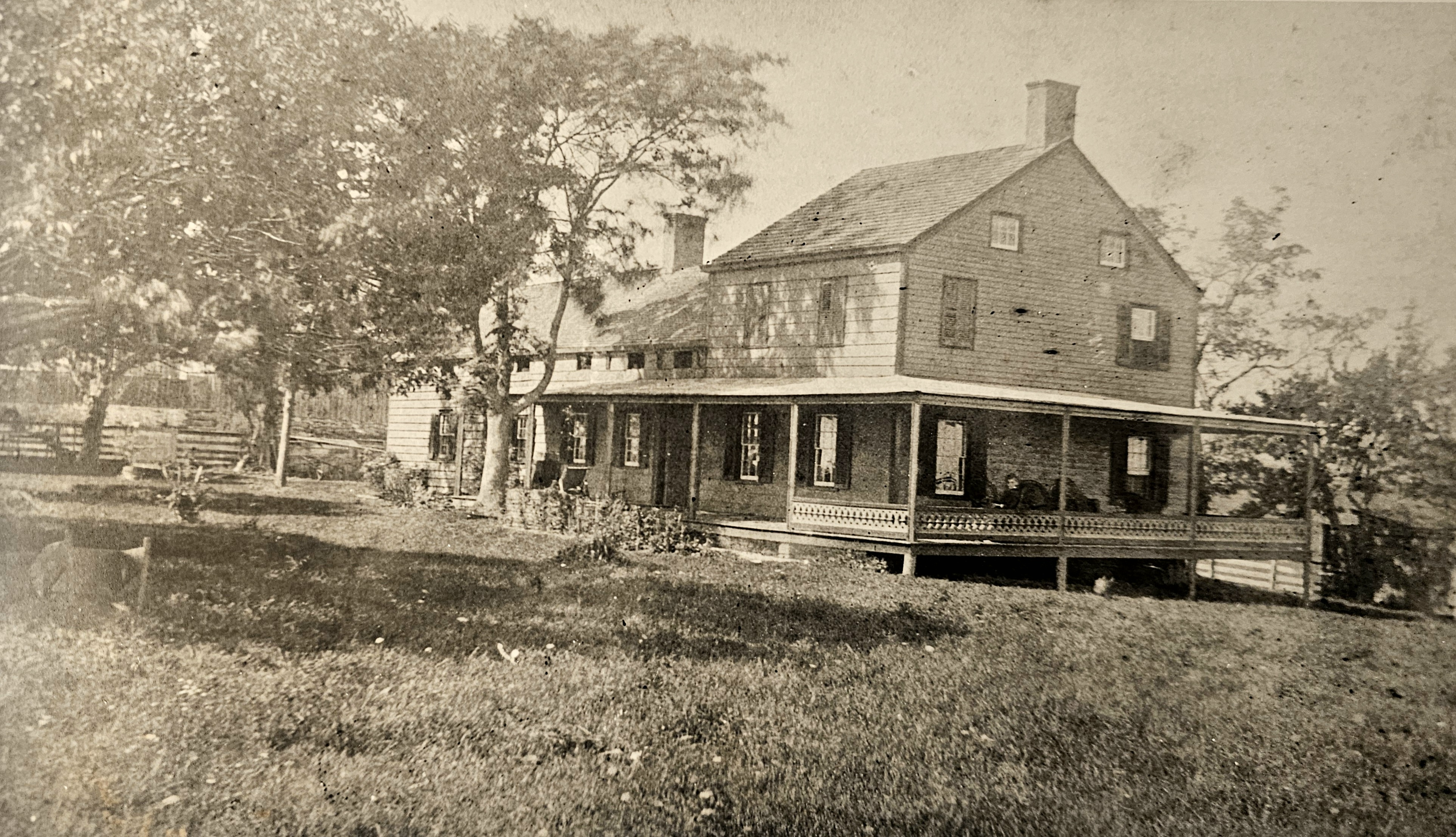
- OakLeaf in 1888, with Adah DeLamater Vezin sitting on porch
- Interactive map of the Oak Leaf area

General information
- Architectural style: Colonial
- Location: 22 New Harbor Rd, Eatons Neck, New York, Huntington, NY, United States
- Coordinates: 40°55′56″N 73°23′13″W
- Completed: 1784

Historic Oak Leaf (1784), or simply Oak Leaf is a colonial era dwelling located on the north shore of Long Island in Eatons Neck, Suffolk County, New York. It was constructed by John Sloss Hobart, and is the only surviving structure built during the manorial era on the former Manor of Eaton that consisted of over 1,500 acres (610 ha). Hobart was the last Lord of the manor and a Revolutionary War Hero. He later served as a U.S. Senator, Federal Justice of New York and Justice of the New York Supreme Court. He was a member of the New York convention that ratified the United States Constitution in 1788 and served on the committee of three who designed the Great Seal of the State of New York.

== Construction ==
In early 1784, Hobart returned to Eaton's Neck at the conclusion of the War. Due to his unwavering support of the revolution, the British had sacked the Manor house, Cherry Lawn, leaving it unfit for habitation. For temporary living quarters, Hobart had a simple farmhouse constructed in a cleared area on the highest elevation on Duck Island Harbor. He named the structure Oak Leaf for the abundance of tall oak trees. After the restoration of Cherry Lawn, the Hobarts moved out and Oak Leaf was thereafter used as a guest house.

== Successive Owners ==
John Sloss Hobart sold Eaton's Neck to Robert Watts of New York City in 1788 who later sold the Neck to John Gardiner of Gardiners Island in a deed recorded on May 15, 1792. Jonathan Gardiner, John's son, later bought-out the other family heirs in 1813 to become the sole owner of Eaton's Neck. He lived at Cherry Lawn, but added a large western addition to Oak Leaf in 1820. His son, George Gardiner, inherited Oak Leaf and 80 acres in 1833 and used it as his home. In 1864, George Gardiner sold Oak Leaf to industrialist Cornelius H. DeLamater who acquired all the Gardiner family holdings from 1858 to 1864 and thus stopped the continued break-up of the former Manor of Eaton.

== Colonial Well & Pumphouse ==
Between 1784 and 1840, a large brick-lined well was dug 70 feet deep west of the house with a windmill above it for pumping water. In 1890, the windmill was replaced with a pumphouse containing electric pumps run by a dynamo generator. A network of pipes were run from this location to various structures on the DeLamater Estate. Thus the pumphouse at Oak Leaf became the primary source of pressurized water on Eaton's Neck. The well remains today as one of the last preserved and funcitional colonial brick-lined wells on Long Island.

== Later years ==
In 1882, Oak Leaf was expanded with a large eastern addition to the structure. This included a wrap-around porch facing the harbor. DeLamater then deeded the farmhouse and 80 acres (32 ha) that included the entire western shore of Duck Island Harbor to his daughter, Adah DeLamater Vezin (Veh-Zann) as a wedding gift. Her husband Charles Vezin became a well known painter. The Vezin's also constructed clay tennis courts and used the house as a summer retreat. In 1900, Adah's brother-in-law George H. Robinson purchased Oak Leaf and most of the former DeLamater Estate from Adah's siblings. Adah retained 15 acres (6.1 ha) at Clamshell Point, and this section of her former Oak Leaf Estate was subdivided in 1955 as Clamshell Lane by her heirs.

During the Robinson's ownership, Oak Leaf was used as both a guest house and later a workingman's cottage for staff on the estate. The author John Steinbeck rented the house in the early 1920's.

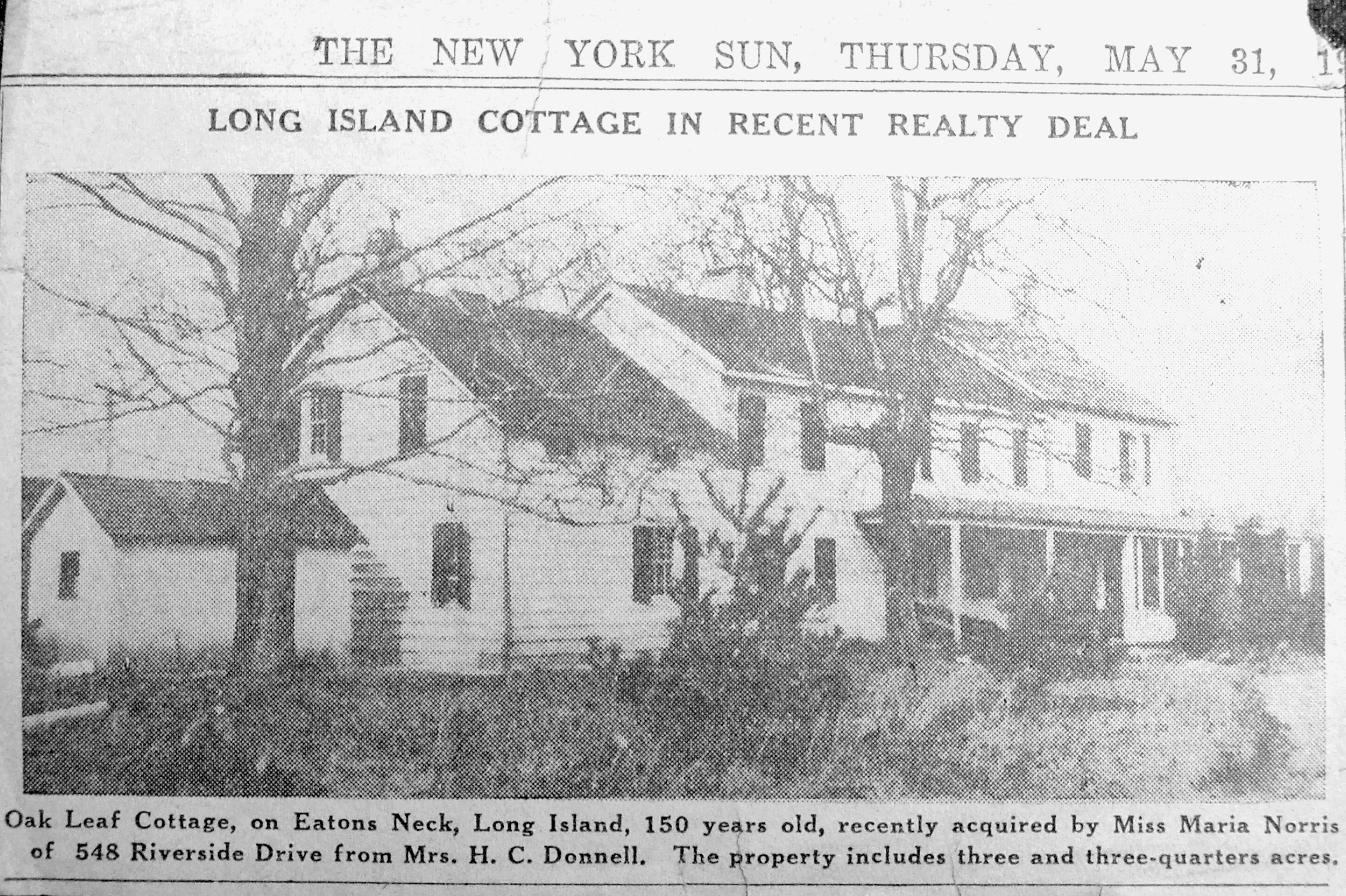
New York Sun 1934 news clip announcing the sale of Historic Oak Leaf in Eaton's Neck, Long Island, NY

In May, 1934, Oak Leaf was sold to Miss Maria Norris of New York City on a 3.5-acre (1.4 ha) parcel that was later expanded to a 5.7-acre (2.3 ha) parcel to retain the waterfront. The Norris purchase also included the adjacent Barnacle carriage house constructed in 1902 designed by Harry E. Donnell.

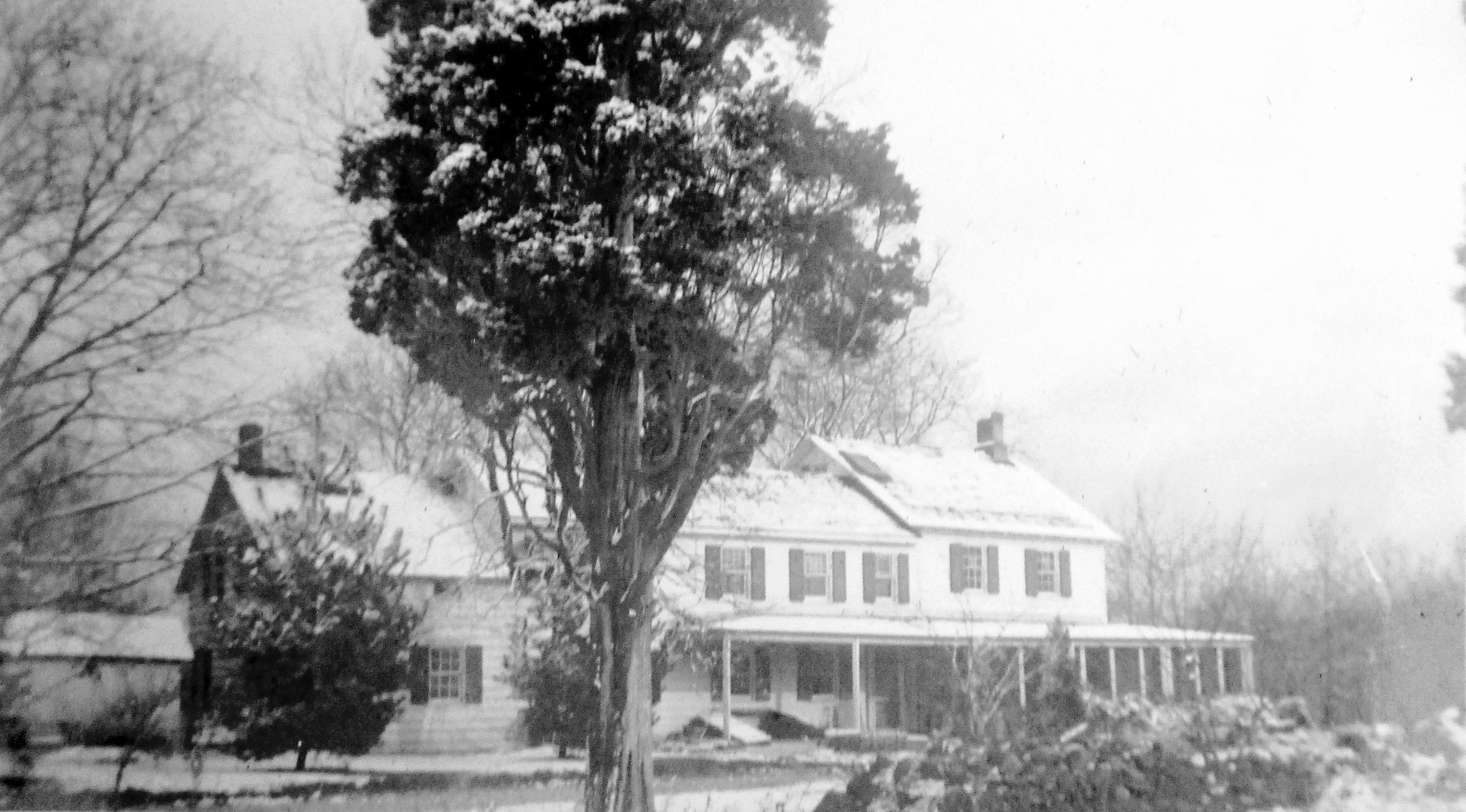
Historic OakLeaf, Eaton's Neck, NY in winter 1938

In May 2004, Oak Leaf suffered a tragic fire and required an extensive rebuild to the eastern half of the structure that was completed in 2005.

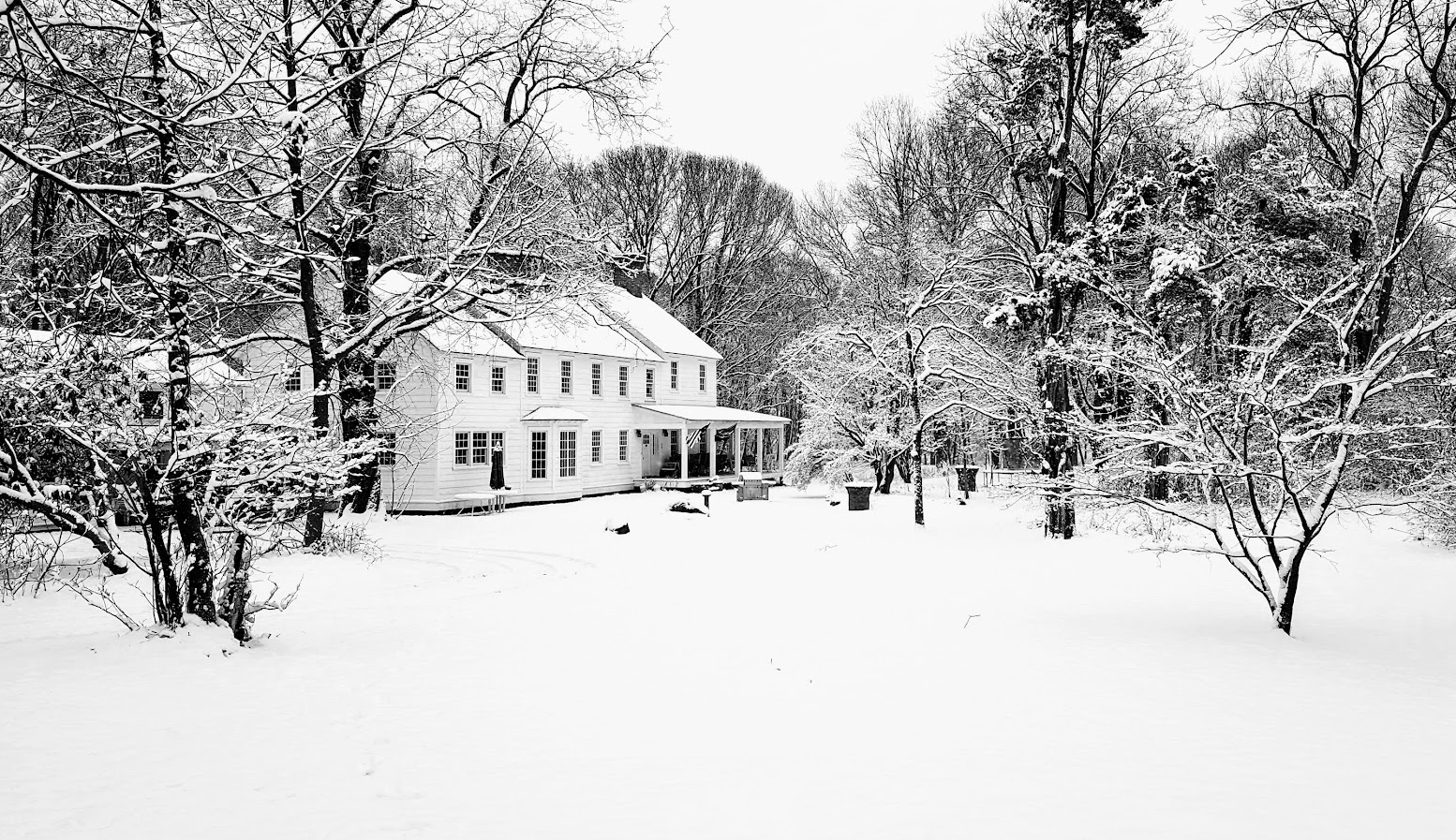
South facade of Historic Oak Leaf in Eaton's Neck, Long Island, NY in Winter 2018

Today, the property spans between New and South Harbor Roads and is bounded on the east by Duck Island Harbor. The historic structure can best be viewed from the southern terminus of South Harbor Road.

== Sources ==
- United States Congress. "John Sloss Hobart (id: H000661)". Biographical Directory of the United States Congress.
