= Northport High School =

Location
- 154 Laurel Hill Road; East Northport, New York; United States; 40°52′46″N 73°20′27″W

Information
- Type: Public high school
- Established: 1966
- School district: Northport-East Northport Union Free School District
- Principal: Robert Dennis
- Teaching staff: 152.16 (FTE)
- Grades: 9–12
- Enrollment: 1,645 (2022–23)
- Student to teacher ratio: 10.81
- Campus: Suburban
- Colors: Blue and Gold
- Mascot: Tiger
- Website: Northport High School

Northport High School is a public four-year secondary school located within the hamlet of East Northport in Suffolk County, on Long Island, in New York, United States. It serves as the high school for the Northport-East Northport Union Free School District, which includes all of Asharoken, East Northport, and Eatons Neck – along with almost all of Northport and a large portion of Fort Salonga within the Town of Huntington.

Northport High School is home to over 2,000 students and 270 staff members and offers the International Baccalaureate program, two National Academy programs, Finance and Information Technology, Project Lead the Way, Project P.A.T.C.H. and more than 20 Advanced Placement courses. The school's athletic teams are known as the Tigers.

== Location ==
Northport High School is located on the corner of Elwood and Laurel Hill Roads. Although it is called Northport High School, it technically sits on East Northport land. To the west is a Wilson Technological Center campus, part of Western Suffolk BOCES. The Long Island Rail Road's Port Jefferson Branch bounds the school to the south.

== History ==
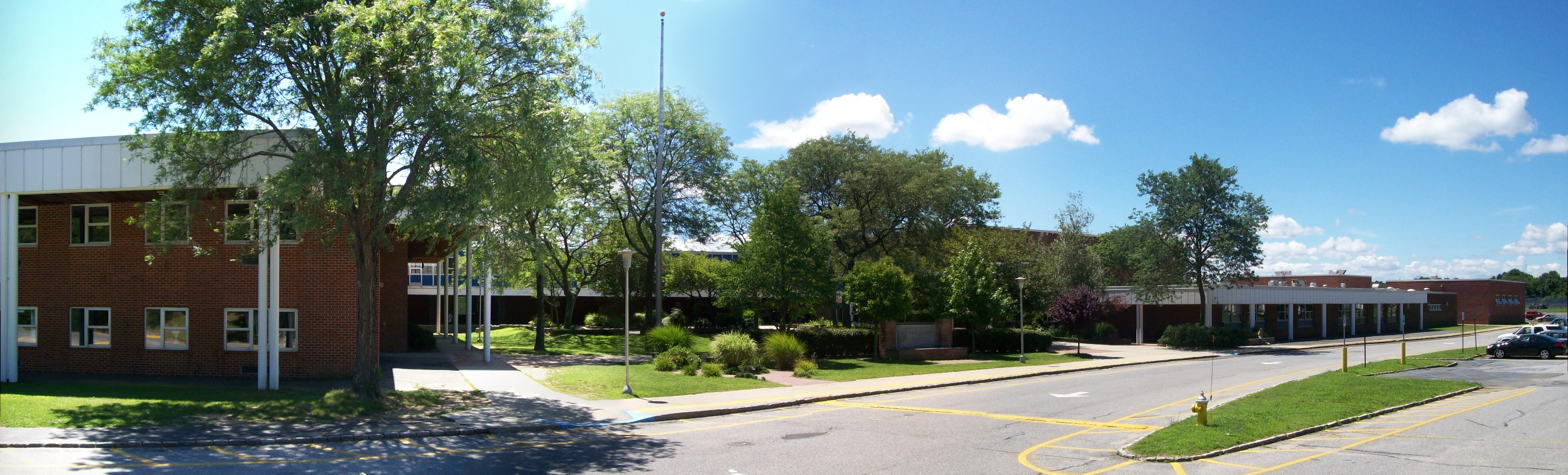
Northport High School, seen from Laurel Hill Road in 2008

A high school department was first organized in Northport in 1896, with the first graduating class following in 1900. Classes were held along with other grade levels at the only School in Northport located on School Street. In 1924, all grades were relocated to a new 500-student K-12 school located on Laurel Avenue. In 1938 all elementary school students were transferred out to newly constructed schools, leaving the Laurel Avenue school as a Junior/Senior High School. Currently, the Laurel Avenue School functions as the district office.

After World War II, servicemen returning from overseas brought tremendous population growth to suburban Long Island. The subsequent baby boom led to explosive school enrollment, which resulted in rampant school overcrowding throughout the 1950s. To accommodate this growth the High School and Junior High School had to separate. In January 1956 the High School relocated to a new campus-style school located on Middleville Road. This was the third home for Northport High School students but the first facility to bear the name Northport High School. But the new school building still couldn't remedy the overcrowding problem, forcing the high school to become a three-year school by moving the 9th grade down to the Junior High Schools. As overcrowding continued to worsen, Northport High School had to go on an overlapping session in 1962–63, and on double session from 1964 to 1966.

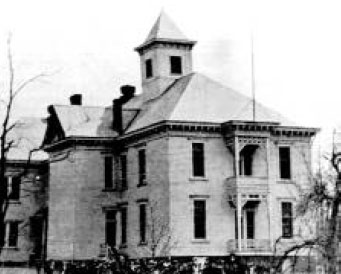
The School Street School – the original building used by high school students in Northport

The overcrowding problem was finally remedied with the construction of the present Northport High School on Laurel Hill Road. This new school building opened its doors to approximately 1500 students in the fall of 1966, and remains the location of Northport High School today. In 1988 the school district moved 9th grade back to the High School after 29 years, and renamed all Junior High Schools "Middle Schools".

Over 25,000 students have graduated from Northport High School since its inception in 1896.

== Facility ==
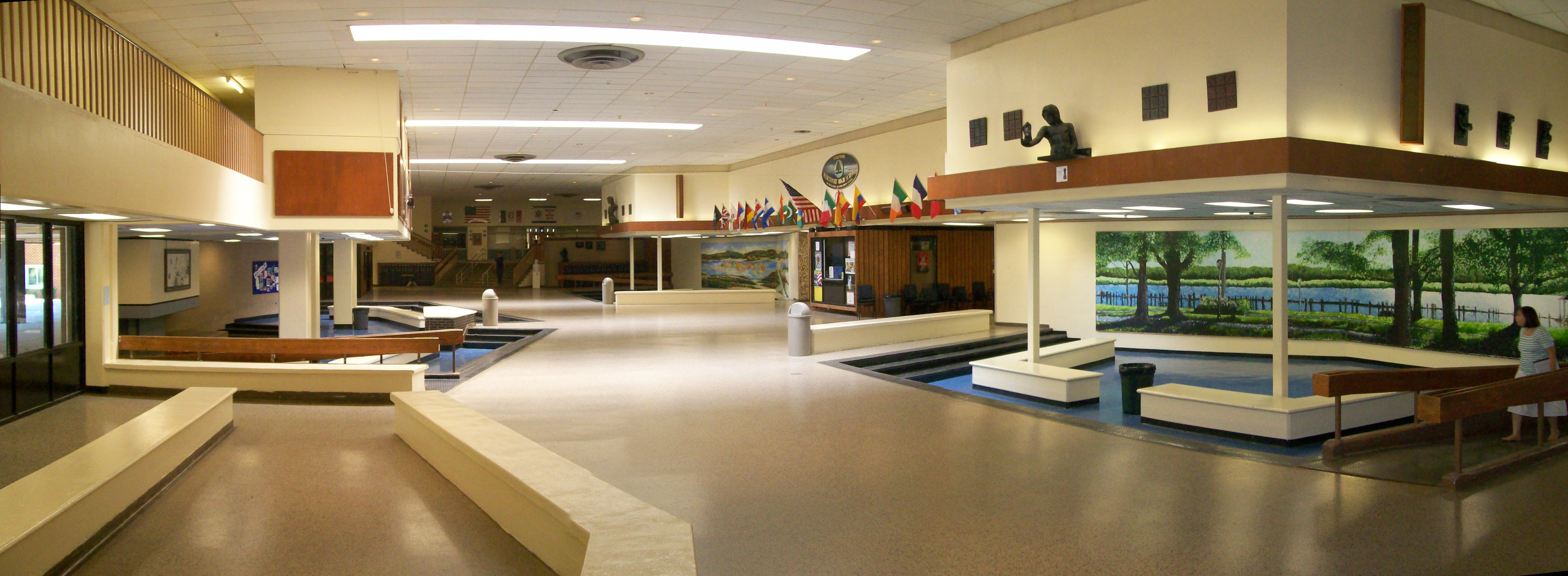
The Northport High School Commons, looking towards the library in 2008

The main part of the school began construction in 1963, opening for the 1966–67 school year on September 7, 1966. A few years later, the L wing began construction and opened for the 1969–70 school year on September 3, 1969. A unique feature of the school building is the large open area, called the Commons, that visitors enter into immediately from the main entrance. The Commons acts as a hub for the entire school. Both the large and small cafeteria, faculty dining room, library and auditorium are located directly off the Commons, from which students may visit The Tiger's Den (school store) and access almost all of the schools wings. There is a balcony on the north side, providing access to the school's administrative offices and counseling center. The Commons is also a favorite hangout of NHS students who congregate there before and after school, during lunch and free periods. In each corner lies the "wells," partially enclosed recessed areas where students can catch up on work, socialize or relax. The largest well has been designated for the senior class through decades of tradition, leaving the two smaller wells for the junior and sophomore classes. As part of an extensive grade restructuring of the entire Northport-East Northport Union Free School District in 1988, the 9th grade was reassigned from each of the junior high schools (as they were called at the time) to the high school. This created two incoming classes that year, including freshmen for the first time. Since there was no existing well for the new freshman class and one could not be constructed, the high school built the freshman benches instead.

A smaller (Little) theater frequently used by drama classes is located just beyond the commons to the northeast, as are two gyms (large and small) to the southwest. The small gym which contains a few basketball courts. Beyond the library on the east side of the building (in the L wing) is another, albeit considerably smaller open area, known as the Small Commons.

In 2003, the school underwent construction and expanded. The new K-wing added family and consumer science classrooms on the first floor where the student-run preschool is located and additional regular classrooms on the second floor. The existing A-wing saw a new dance room. Additionally, in the A Wing photography labs, car care classrooms, music administrative office, music classroom, music computer lab, and an orchestra room were added. The Physical Education Wing also saw renovations. The old weight room was remade into two health infusion classrooms, and a section was added onto the Small Gym. A new weight room was built off of the small gym. A part of the existing L wing also underwent renovations. Construction was complete for the 2004–05 school year.

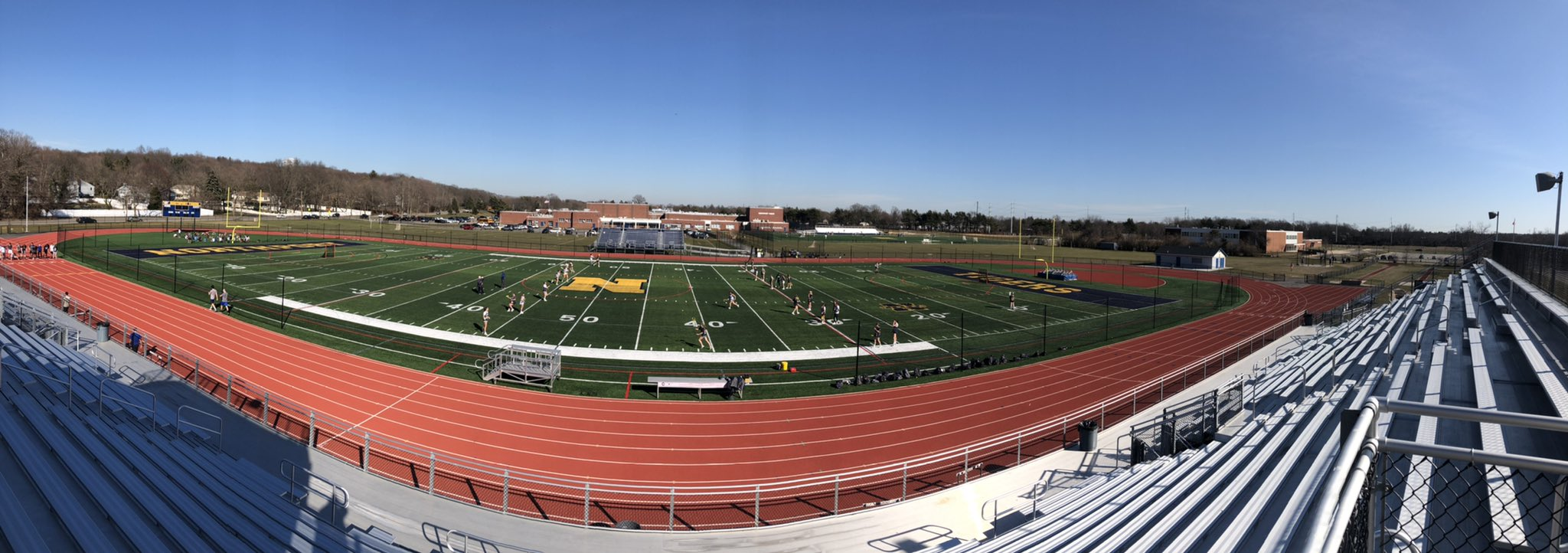
Northport High School's football field after bond renovation

In 2016, a bond of $39.9 million was proposed. Among several classroom renovations and HVAC improvements to be done, one of the most notable changes was a turf field for the high school. The bond was finalized.

== Departments and programs ==
NHS offers a wide variety of classes in many subjects. Advance Placement (AP) courses are offered in all the five core departments of English, foreign languages, mathematics, sciences and social studies. In mathematics, the school offers one and two year acceleration programs, in addition to a one year accelerated science program. The high school provides a particularly rich elective program, with study in the art, business and music fields, all of which also offer study at the AP level. Many other honor and college level classes allow students the opportunity to earn college credits colleges like Farmingdale State College (in PROGRAM), Long Island University (in business) and Syracuse University (through Project Advance English and Computer Engineering). The International Baccalaureate Program is offered on the certificate and diploma level.

Northport has a well-established and recognized music program. Many students avail themselves of the chance to explore and excel at all different types of music ranging from voice, band, orchestra, composition, etc. The school was named a Grammy Signature School by the Grammy Foundation four times, in 2000, 2001, 2003, and 2006. MENC: The National Association for Music Education also named Northport as one of the 100 best communities for music education in America.

The art department is another highly recognized department. Students can take higher level AP and IB art classes in addition to computer art, photography, painting, cartoon drawing and sculpture electives. Students have won many different awards for their artistic talents.

For its overall distinction in academics and service, NHS was awarded the Claes Nobel School of Distinction by The National Society of High School Scholars in March 2004.

=== Academy programs ===
NHS has two national academy programs, Academy of Finance (AOF) and Academy of Information Technology. AOF teaches business and financial skills. For example, AOF members learn accounting, finance, marketing and management with the opportunity to earn college credit. Students are also eligible for a paid internship, usually during the summer between their junior and senior years. Students in AOIT learn how to utilize new technology in the workplace. Programming, database and web administration are particularly emphasized. Like in the AOF, AOIT students may receive college credit and a paid internship usually just before senior year.

=== Environmental Team ===
Another specialized program offered at NHS is the Environmental Team (E-Team), an interdisplnary college preparatory program. Students participate in community service, environmental clean-ups, fund-raising and aspects of self-governance.

=== PATCH Project ===
Participatory Awareness Through Community Help (PATCH) was created by Thomas J. O'Donnell in 1969 in hope of educating more students about the Constitution and United States history and civics. From the PATCH program came several law-related electives offered by the social studies department. One of PATCH's electives, Constitutional Law, supplements the regular New York State eleventh grade American history curriculum and remains popular to this day. PATCH currently partners with Touro Law College and the New York State Bar Association.

== Clubs ==
NHS offers over 50 clubs and extracurricular activities to the student body. Some of which include: Academic (trivia) Team; Students Helping and Relating to Each Other (SHARE, part of the Natural Helpers program); The Port Press (The High School's Newspaper); Ultimate Intramurals (among others); DECA; Wilderness, Robotics, New York City and foreign languages clubs; Model United Nations; Fashion Club; Interact Club; Science and Math Olympiads; Law Club, and Business, Technology, Young Democrats Club, Powdered Wigs (drama club), Music and Art Honor Societies.

The largest and most active student organizations are the National Honor Society and Students for 60,000. The Honor Society runs many school and community services such as peer tutoring, fund raisers, the Senior Citizens' Prom and several other community outreach programs. The society's most notable event is A Midwinter Nights Dream which has raised $2,500,000 toward research for a cure for Amyotrophic lateral sclerosis (ALS). Students for 60,000 is a community service group that assists those in the Northport community and beyond: twice a year the club travels to Nicaragua to assist the needy there.

== Notable alumni ==
=== Performing arts ===
- Aesop Rock (born Ian Matthias Bavitz, June 5, 1976), is an American hip hop recording artist and producer. He was at the forefront of the new wave of underground and alternative hip hop acts that emerged during the late 1990s and early 2000s. Bavitz attended Northport High School in 1990 and graduated in 1994.
- Peter Calandra – Film and television composer, pianist
- Elisa Donovan – Television and film actress, best known for her role as Amber Mariens in Clueless
- Edie Falco – Broadway, movie, and television actress best known for her role as Carmela Soprano on The Sopranos and her role as Jackie Peyton on Nurse Jackie
- Elizabeth Hendrickson – television actress best known for her role as twin sisters Frankie and Maggie Stone on All My Children
- Patti LuPone – Tony Award-winning Broadway and television actress, best known for her role as Eva Peron in Evita Class of 1967.
- Chris Messina – television actor, best known for his role as Ted Fairwell on Six Feet Under
- Dan Milano –writer and voice actor best known as the co-creator of the television show Greg the Bunny, class of 1990
- John Scurti – television actor, best known for his role as Lt. Kenny "Lou" Shea on Rescue Me
- Jordan Firstman -an American writer, producer, comedian, and singer living in Los Angeles, California. He is known for television show, I Love LA, and English Teacher.
- Marty Lauter -an American drag performer and actor who competed on season 15 of RuPaul's Drag Race and acted in the recent revival of Cabaret on Broadway.

=== Sports ===
- Mikey Brannigan – runner
- Luke Petrasek - professional Basketball player
- Allie Long – NWSL soccer player for the Portland Thorns and the United States Women's National Soccer Team
- Andrew Lichtenberger – professional poker player
- Craig McEwen – NFL player for the Washington Redskins and San Diego Chargers, class of 1983
- Steve Park – NASCAR race car driver, class of 1985
- Bobby Wine – Major League Baseball player and manager.

=== Other ===
- Gregg Kaplan — Founder and former CEO of Redbox, Class of 1988.
- Ricky Kasso – murderer
- Bruce Morrison – United States Congressman from Connecticut, 1983 through 1991. Class of 1962
- Brian Ulrich – photographer, Class of 1989

== See also ==
- Elwood-John H. Glenn High School
- Harborfields High School
