= Meistrich =

Meistrich is a surname. Notable people with the surname include:

- Donna Meistrich (born 1954), American artist
- Larry Meistrich (born 1966), American film producer
