= Eaton Harbors Corporation =

The Eaton Harbors Corporation (EHC) is a New York business corporation created in 1927 by the heirs of Cornelius H. DeLamater to hold title to and maintain approximately 33.2 acres (134,000 m^{2}) of private roads and beaches located in Eatons Neck, New York. The EHC was formed due to the break-up of the vast Delamater Estate that at one time occupied over 1,000 acres (4.0 km^{2}) on the North Shore of Long Island on the Eatons Neck and Asharoken peninsula.

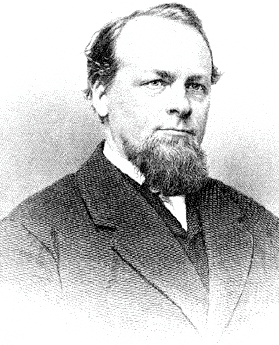
C. H. DeLamater.

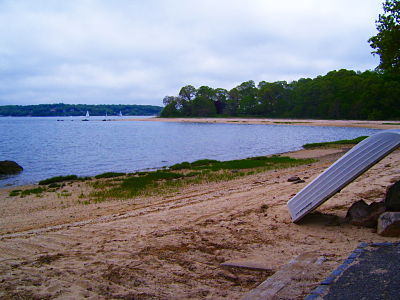
Eaton Harbors Corp Beach

== Background ==
The corporation was created on September 14, 1927 by the heirs of Cornelius H. DeLamater who at the time still collectively owned approximately 575 acres (2.33 km^{2}) of land in Eatons Neck and Asharoken. Mr. DeLamater was owner of the Delamater Iron Works in New York City. The iron works was responsible for constructing the turret and machinery of the Union Ironclad Monitor during the Civil War. Delamater created a vast estate on Eaton's Neck beginning in 1862, and the Eaton Harbors Corporation was created when the estate was subdivided for sale. The DeLamater Mansion still stands today as a landmark home in the community. The EHC is a not-for-profit association supported by legal covenants upon property deeds. About 30% of EHC property owners live in the Village of Asharoken while the other 70% are located within the Town of Huntington.". A total of 1,174 shares of stock are assigned to 170 parcels of property ranging in size from 1 to 5 acres. An annual assessment is levied upon the shareholders of the EHC to support roads and beaches. Shares remain with the land, and cannot be purchased, sold, or refused. Unpaid assessments automatically become a lien upon the land as per the restrictive covenant.

The EHC maintains a public website for the benefit of shareholders in the Corporation."

Noted architect Harry E. Donnell, who was married to a granddaughter of Cornelius DeLamater, served as President of the Eaton Harbors Corporation from 1927 to 1950." The corporation's current president is Timothy Dwyer.

== See also ==
- Harry E. Donnell
- Cornelius H. DeLamater
- Oak Leaf (house)
