= Joseph Jesselli =

American guitar maker and luthier (born 1949)

Joseph Jesselli (born August 21, 1949 – December 28, 2024) was an American guitar maker and luthier who lived in East Northport, NY on Long Island. He built guitars since 1978. He was described as the “Stradivari of Huntington" by The New York Times. He was the maternal uncle of Anthony Cumia, formerly of the Opie and Anthony radio show, and current host of The Anthony Cumia Show.

Joe Jesselli made artisan quality electric hollow-body guitars. His instruments have distinct Art Deco and Art Nouveau influences. His guitars are owned by a number of notable musicians. A Jesselli "Rifle Guitar", owned by Keith Richards of The Rolling Stones, was once featured in Guitar World magazine. Jesselli guitars were used to record "Undercover of the Night" and "Too Much Blood" from The Rolling Stones album Undercover. Richards can be seen playing an electric Jesselli Archtop guitar in the music videos for those songs.

Jesselli was the only in-studio apprentice to Jimmy D'Aquisto, the Huntington, NY luthier famous for elite arch-top type guitars popular among jazz musicians. Jesselli worked in D'Aquisto's workshop for over six years, from 1973 until about 1980. Prior to that, Jesselli apprenticed under Marcos Baiter, an Argentinian-born master wood carver and furniture maker who maintained a Long Island workshop in Huntington, NY.

On December, 28, 2024, his nephew Anthony Cumia reported that his uncle had died earlier that day.

== Jesselli Guitars ==
A Jesselli headstock from a "Tiered" guitar

A Jesselli Modernaire Guitar

Joseph Jesselli makes both acoustic and electric guitars. Instruments can take months, or years, to complete depending upon numerous factors. His instruments are known for both excellent tone as well as ornate design elements and superior quality. Jesselli guitars are usually made to order and tend to cost over ten thousand dollars each. Instruments that are not made to order will be singular works of the maker's own exacting standards. With the exception of his first guitar, all Jesselli guitars are hollow-body. Even the electric guitars, which may look like solid body instruments, are in fact hollow.

The guitars can be very ornate and include many exotic materials, such as extinct mastodon tusk, Brazilian rosewood, ebony, Black Walnut, legally-sourced ivory and semi-precious gemstones such as jade.

Another aspect of Jesselli instruments that sets him apart is his penchant for designing and building nearly every component on the guitar. Most makers are content to simply buy and install many of their parts. On a Jesselli, the tuning machine buttons, truss rod cover, selector switch cap, pickup covers/mounting rings, volume and tone knobs, bridge, and tailpiece are all part of the canvas and therefore cannot be overlooked. No expense in time or material cost is spared in creating even the most peripheral of components. The maker views the instrument as more than just a tool for making music. A Jesselli guitar is functional art.

Jesselli guitars are extremely rare. These are not production guitars, and t maker estimated that he had made fewer than 120 guitars, as of 2011.

== About Jesselli's Pickups ==
A Turkish walnut "1925" Jesselli guitar with tri-coil pickups.

The pickups in a Jesselli guitar are specified by Jesselli and are often custom made for him by Pete Biltoft, the owner of Vintage Vibe Guitars. Each set of pickups is chosen specifically to suit the particular instrument. Jesselli believes that each guitar will have its own sound and requires a specific pickup to voice it properly. The very first guitar he made used Bartolini Hi A pickups with active electronics, long before anyone was using active circuitry.

He may also use pickups from the DiMarzio custom shop, Seymour Duncan custom shop, Ballurio Guitars, T.V. Jones, and Mayes Pickups.

Invariably, pickups will require custom work or modification prior to installation in a Jesselli guitar. A pickup may be completely rewound with tapered wire or changed from a 2-wire to 3 or 4 wire configuration to alter the pickup sonically and to allow for additional tones when changing tone or volume controls or pickup switch positions. Each pickup is also hand-fitted with a custom made leather cover.
