= Donna Meistrich =

- Born: February 28, 1954 (age 72); Brooklyn, New York, U.S.
- Education: Academy of Art University (BA); College of Marin
- Known for: Painting, Animation
- Notable work: Tacky People

Donna Meistrich (born February 28, 1954) is an American wax carver, model maker, painter, sculptor, jewelry designer and animator. She is the co-creator of the Tacky People animated series with her animating partner, co-creator Terry Blumberg.

== Early life ==
Meistrich was born in Brooklyn, New York to Syd and Pearl Meistrich and was the oldest of three children. Growing up on Long Island with her two younger brothers, she graduated Northport High School in 1972. She also attended the Academy of Art University from 1974 to 1978 in San Francisco, where she majored in illustration and graphic design.

== Career ==
She worked in advertising and designing products as an independent designer. She worked on accounts like Harley-Davidson and Rolling Stone magazine. After leaving advertising to make jewelry professionally, she continued her education at the College of Marin.

Meistrich was commissioned to design a custom ring for Jim Carrey to wear in The Truman Show. She also built a dolphin ring that was used in the movie Independence Day. She created the "mesmerizer" and various spider props in the movie Wild Wild West with Will Smith.

=== Tacky People ===
In 1987, Meistrichbegan developing the concept of Tacky People through her jewelry and through her figurine design. In 1978, she met Terry Blumberg at a drawing class at City College of San Francisco. The duo became friends and began collaborating on the "Tacky People" cartoon in 1988.

== Other work ==
Donna Meistrich living on Maui 2023 but continues to work in various media including wax, clay, wood, plaster, stone and cast paper. She has made master models for snow villages, porcelain objects, dolls, toys and gifts. Donna volunteers every year at the Italian Street Painting Festival creating 8'x6' chalk drawings since 1994.
