= Delamater-Bevin Mansion =

Historic house in New York, United States

- U.S. National Register of Historic Places
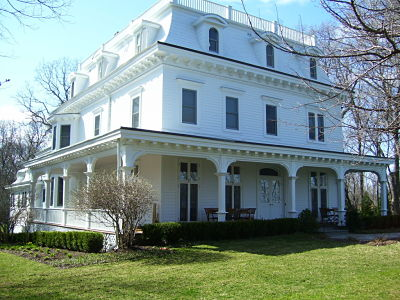

- Location within New York Location within the United States
- Location: Asharoken, New York
- Coordinates: 40°56′5″N 73°22′43″W
- Area: 1 acre (0.40 ha)
- Built: 1867
- Architectural style: Second Empire
- MPS: Huntington Town MRA
- NRHP reference No.: 85002514
- Added to NRHP: September 26, 1985

The Delamater-Bevin Mansion, also known as The Bevin House, is a historic 22-room Victorian mansion on the north shore of Long Island within the Incorporated Village of Asharoken, New York. The estate is on the Eatons Neck landmass on the edge of Duck Island Harbor, an inlet of Northport Bay, off Long Island Sound.

== History ==
The home was built by Cornelius Henry DeLamater in 1862 in the French Second Empire architectural style and was initially known as Vermland. DeLamater owned over 1,000 acres (4.0 km^{2}) of Eaton's Neck and the DeLamater Iron Work in NYC, where W. 13th St meets the Hudson River. The turret, engines, and weaponry on the Ironclad "Monitor" were built by DeLamater's foundry under the direction of noted marine engineer John Ericsson. DeLamater named his summer estate "Vermland" after the Swedish province where Ericsson was born, as the two men were best of friends and inseparable. After DeLamater's death on February 7, 1889, his Eaton's Neck estate was inherited by his wife, Ruth Oakley Caller DeLamater, who died on December 7, 1894, leaving the estate to their daughter Laura DeLamater Bevin. Over time, the house gradually became known as "The Bevin House. Laura DeLamater Bevin died on March 4, 1920, and her son Sydney Bevin inherited the property.

During World War II, the exiled French writer and pioneering aviator Antoine de Saint-Exupéry rented The Bevin House, where he wrote much of the well-known novel The Little Prince in late 1942. (Note: From 1993 until 2002, an image of The Little Prince, first sketched by Antoine de Saint-Exupéry within the Delamater-Bevin Mansion, appeared on France's 50-franc note.) He lived there with Consuelo de Saint-Exupéry, and they hosted their common friend Denis de Rougemont.

Sydney Bevin died on May 29, 1960, and The Bevin House was sold to Frederick and June Froessel in 1965. In 1979, the estate was purchased by real estate developer Nikos Kefalidis, who commissioned an extensive restoration of the mansion. Kefalidis was killed in the crash of Swiss Air 111 on September 2, 1998.

The Delamater-Bevin Mansion was added to the National Register of Historic Places in 1985.

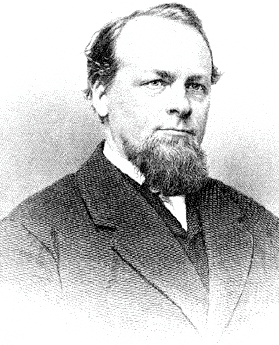
Cornelius Henry DeLamater 1821–1889.

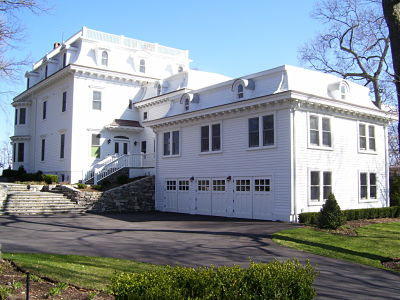
Rear of The Bevin House, showing its employees' wing.

== See also ==
- The Little Prince
