= Craig Ricci Shaynak =

American actor

Craig Ricci Shaynak (born July 14, 1969), sometimes credited as Craig Shaynak, is an American character actor. He has been active in Chicago and Los Angeles theater as well as national television and film.

== Life and career ==
Shaynak was born in Northport, New York. He graduated from the University of Chicago with a degree in Medieval Drama in 1991. At university he produced several plays with dramatist David Bevington. Shaynak's first theater production and acting experience after university was in The Mystery Cycle, an American adaptation of a British modernization of the Wakefield Cycle. He also performed in various theater productions in the Chicago area.

Shaynak continued acting, appearing in movies, television, and on stage, including at numerous festivals.

Shaynak has helmed a production company called Kingswell Productions since 2007. He spearheaded the 2010 Los Angeles production of The Pharmacist, a one-woman show which first played in Australia.
