= Northport-East Northport Union Free School District =

School district in the U.S. state of New York

Location
- Northport, Suffolk County, New York; United States

District information
- Type: Public
- Grades: KG-12
- Established: 1922
- Superintendent: David Moyer
- Schools: 9
- Budget: $132,411,000
- NCES District ID: 3621270

Students and staff
- Students: 4,386
- Teachers: 577
- Staff: 1,111
- Student–teacher ratio: 10.97
- District mascot: Tigers
- Colors: Blue and yellow

Other information
- District Offices: 158 Laurel Ave Northport, NY 11768
- Website: web.northport.k12.ny.us

Northport-East Northport Union Free School District is a school district within the Town of Huntington in Suffolk County, New York on the North Shore of Long Island serving most of Northport, all of Eatons Neck, Asharoken, and East Northport, along with a large part of Fort Salonga.

== History ==
In 1922 the East Northport and Eatons Neck districts united with Northport, forming the Northport-East Northport Union Free School District, and in 1924, a new building opened on Laurel Avenue. It was designed to hold 500 students of all grades. That year, Mervin D. Losey was named the first superintendent of the Northport-East Northport School District. In 1938 two elementary schools were constructed, Ocean Avenue School in Northport and Larkfield School in East Northport.

In 1926, the Huntington part of the Fort Salonga school district consolidated with Northport-East Northport Union Free School District.

In the 1950s, tremendous population growth caused the construction of Dickinson Avenue Elementary School, as well as Fifth Avenue and Norwood Avenue Elementary schools, and East Northport Junior High School. In addition, the Senior High School moved into a campus style school on Middleville Road, and the Laurel Avenue building became a Junior High School. The distance between the East Northport community and the high school caused difficulty for students. The high school became a three-year-high school with ninth grade moving down to the junior high schools. In 1962 Pulaski Road Elementary School opened its doors. Later, due to overcrowding, a new high school was constructed on Laurel Hill Road, which opened in 1966. Consequently, the Middleville Road building also became a middle school. This year, Bellerose Avenue School was also opened.

In 1970, a fire destroyed the upper floor of Ocean Avenue School. In 1982, Larkfield School closed, and the property was sold. In 1988, 9th graders were moved back to the high school, as part of an extensive grade restructuring. In 1991 Middleville Road Middle School Was closed, and in 1997 Northport Middle School relocated to the Middleville Road facility.

In 2003–2004, additions were made to Northport High School, Northport Middle School, and East Northport Middle School. More recently, in 2010, the school district has been threatened with potential budget cuts in the 2010-11 budget, potentially causing a loss of 40 teachers, and of the district wide summer music program. However, the school budget has not yet been finalized. Most of the cuts are related to a significant decrease in state aid.

In 2020, investigations of asbestos, mercury, and mold in the campus were confirmed, and the school closed until the start of the 2020-21 school year. On May 18, 2021, residents voted down the 2021-22 school budget by 2,069 no votes to 1,902 yes votes.

== Education ==
Educational offerings in the schools are broad in scope. A basic education program is offered at all levels, and augmenting it is a wide range of elective programs to meet the interests, abilities, needs and career goals of district pupils. Special services are provided by district staff and the Board of Cooperative Educational Services (BOCES). Northport High School is the only high school in the nation to offer an International Baccalaureate program, two National Academy Programs (Finance & Information Technology), more than 20 AP/IB courses, a science research program, Project Lead the Way, and a state model law program.

The school district also offers acceleration programs, of a one to two year acceleration in math, and of a one-year acceleration in science. The high school has a large range of challenging programs available for students. The high school's art and music department are highly recognized. Pupils perform well above the norm on state and national examinations and graduating seniors receive a large number of scholarships and awards. Over 95% of high school graduates continue their education.

== Facilities ==
The district includes one high school, Northport High School, two middle schools, East Northport Middle School and Northport Middle School, and six elementary schools: Bellerose Elementary School, Dickinson Avenue Elementary School, Fifth Avenue Elementary School, Norwood Avenue School, Ocean Avenue School, and Pulaski Road School. The district office is at William J. Brosnan School (previously known as Laurel Avenue School), named after the retired Superintendent of Schools William J. Brosnan.

Students K-5 will either attend Bellerose, Dickinson Avenue, Fifth Avenue, Norwood, Ocean, or Pulaski Elementary Schools, depending on where they live. Students from Dickinson, Norwood, and Ocean Avenue attend Northport Middle School for Grades 6–8, whereas students from Pulaski and Fifth Avenue attend East Northport Middle School for grades 6–8. Half of the Bellerose population goes to Northport, and half goes to East Northport. All students in the district attend Northport High School, which offers a large variety of elective programs and the IB and AP programs.

At one time, the district contained seven elementary schools, three middle schools, and one high school. However, Larkfield School and Middleville Road Middle School were eventually closed (although the Middleville Road Campus was still used, whereas the Larkfield Campus was sold). The Larkfield School was closed due to declining enrollment, and has been subsequently made into a retirement home. In 2021, the district decided to close both Dickinson Avenue and Bellerose elementary schools due to declining enrollment in both.

The Laurel Avenue building still functions as the district office, and occasionally hosts field trips by other schools in the district.
