= Cornelius H. DeLamater =

American industrialist (1821–1889)

Cornelius Henry DeLamater
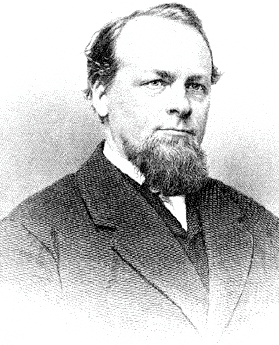
- Born: August 30, 1821; Rhinebeck, New York, US
- Died: February 2, 1889 (aged 67); New York City, US
- Occupation: Industrialist
- Years active: 1841–1889
- Spouse: Ruth Oakley Caller DeLamater
- Children: 6

Cornelius Henry DeLamater (August 30, 1821 – February 2, 1889) was an American industrialist who owned DeLamater Iron Works in New York City. The steam boilers and machinery for the ironclad USS Monitor were built in DeLamater's Iron Works foundry during the American Civil War (1861–1865). Swedish immigrants marine engineer and inventor John Ericsson considered DeLamater his closest, most intimate friend.

== Life ==
Cornelius H. DeLamater was born on August 30, 1821, in Rhinebeck, New York, his family moving to New York City when Cornelius was three years old. His father was hired by a very small iron foundry, the Phoenix Iron Works of James Cunningham on West Street, as cashier and confidential advisor. At 16, Cornelius entered the Phoenix Foundry, and at age 20, upon the death of Cunningham, he formed a co-partnership with Peter Hogg under the name Hogg and DeLamater. This firm continued from 1842 to 1857, when Hogg retired from the business. The firm was re-formed as the DeLamater Iron Works, and moved to the foot of West 13th Street on the west side of Lower Manhattan, facing the Hudson River.

At an early age, DeLamater developed an unusual ability in solving problems that were then developing in regard to steam engineering and machinery. During the American Civil War he worked with Capt. John Ericsson (1803-1889), in the development of the ironclads Monitor and subsequent Dictator, which were constructed in an incredibly short space of time. In time, the DeLamater Iron Works foundries became known as the asylum where inventors and capitalists could go to experiment and attempt new feats. The Iron Witch was next constructed, the first iron steamboat. The hot air engine of Capt. Ericsson was first introduced in the ship Ericsson, which was built entirely by DeLamater. The DeLamater Iron Works was also the place where the first submarine boat, first self-propelled torpedo, first torpedo boat, and the engines for the original Monitor were built. At the time of his death, the DeLamater Iron Works employed over 1000 men.

== Eaton's Neck Estate ==
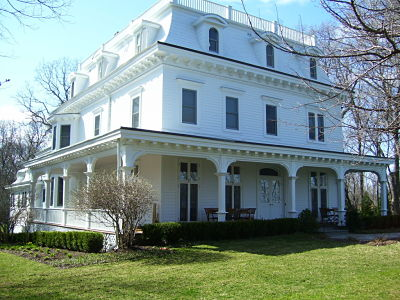
DeLamater-Bevin Mansion

DeLamater's leisure moments were spent at his Beacon Farm on Eatons Neck, on Long Island, New York state where he had 1,250 acres (5.1 km^{2}) of choice land on the North Shore of the western end of Long Island, and the "finest blooded stock in America" as described by the famed daily newspaper The New York Times. The DeLamater Estate included everything beyond what is today #325 Asharoken Avenue. This includes the upper half of Asharoken Beach, the Morgan Estate, the Eaton Harbors or Two Acre Zone of Eaton's Neck, and the Bevin Road peninsula in Asharoken. The DeLamater Mansion still stands today on the Eatons Neck peninsula of the island jutting into Long Island Sound, and was rented in 1942 by French author Antoine de Saint-Exupéry who wrote The Little Prince while staying at the mansion. The children and grandchildren of DeLamater also built mansions over time in Eaton's Neck and Asharoken that still stand today, namely "The Point", "The Nest", "The Crest", and "The Hill". The DeLamaters also renovated two nearby smaller existing colonial structures for family estates, namely "Cherry Lawn" and "Oak Leaf".

== Death ==
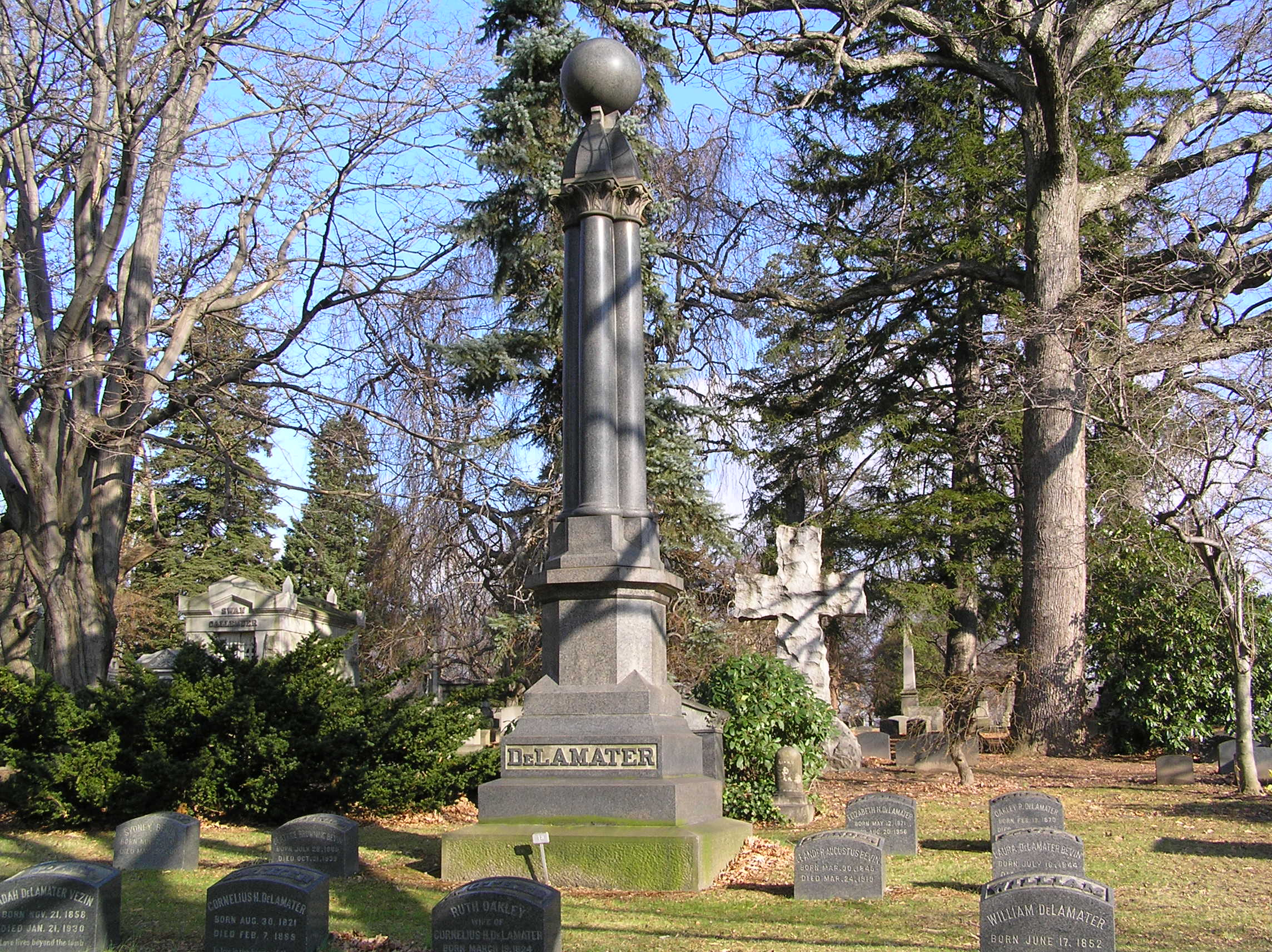
DeLamater's gravesite monument in Woodlawn Cemetery in The Bronx, New York

On February 2, 1889, Cornelius DeLamater died at his home in New York City at age 67 years, and over 600 of his employees attended his funeral, with 500 of them accompanying the casket on board a special train that took the funeral procession from Manhattan to Woodlawn Cemetery in The Bronx, New York, in a service noted by the large obituary in The New York Times. Inventor and Capt. John Ericsson also of U.S.S. Monitor Civil War fame, coincidentally also died only a month later in that same year.

== See also ==
- Eatons Neck
- John Ericsson
- Delamater-Bevin Mansion
- National Register of Historic Places listings in Suffolk County, New York
