= Harry E. Donnell House =

Historic house in New York, United States

- U.S. National Register of Historic Places
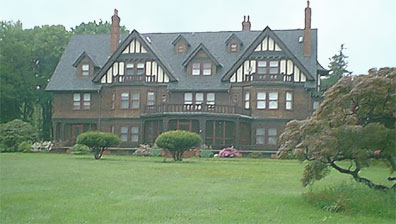
- The Hill, July 2003

- Location within New York Location within the United States
- Location: 71 Locust Ln., Eatons Neck, New York
- Coordinates: 40°56′3″N 73°23′20″W
- Area: 4.5 acres (1.8 ha)
- Built: 1902
- Architects: Donnell, Harry E.; Randall & Miller
- Architectural style: Tudor Revival
- MPS: Huntington Town MRA
- NRHP reference No.: 85002516
- Added to NRHP: September 26, 1985

The Harry E. Donnell House, also known as The Hill, is a historic 33-room Tudor Revival mansion located on the north shore of Long Island, at 71 Locust Lane, Eatons Neck, Suffolk County, New York. The mansion was designed by New York City architect Harry E. Donnell for his wife, Ruth Robinson Donnell on 200 acres (81 ha) of land given to the couple by Ruth's father George H. Robinson. The mansion was constructed in June, 1902 and completed in January, 1903 by the Randall and Miller Company of Freeport, New York. When completed, the mansion had dual waterfronts. The east lawn extended from the mansion to Duck Island Harbor, and had sweeping views of Long Island Sound, while the south lawn extended to Northport Bay. About 80 acres (32 ha) northwest of the mansion was fashioned into a golf course.

In 1927, the estate was subdivided, and the Eaton Harbors Corporation created to maintain the private roads and beaches for the new owners in the subdivision. During the Great Depression sales of building lots on the old estate moved slowly. In 1964, the mansion and 4 acres (1.6 ha) were sold by Nicholas Donnell Ward to the Lang family, and in 1977 purchased by the Treuting and McBrien families. In 1987, it was purchased by Robert Gerlach.

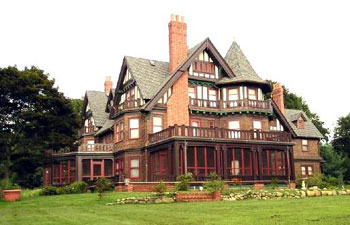
East side of Mansion in 1997

In 1997, the mansion was sold to the Carr family, who obtained the original architectural plans from Nicholas D. Ward and used them to restore the mansion to its original design and finish.

The Harry E. Donnell House was added to the National Register of Historic Places in 1985.
