= Northport, New York =

- Village
- Incorporated Village of Northport
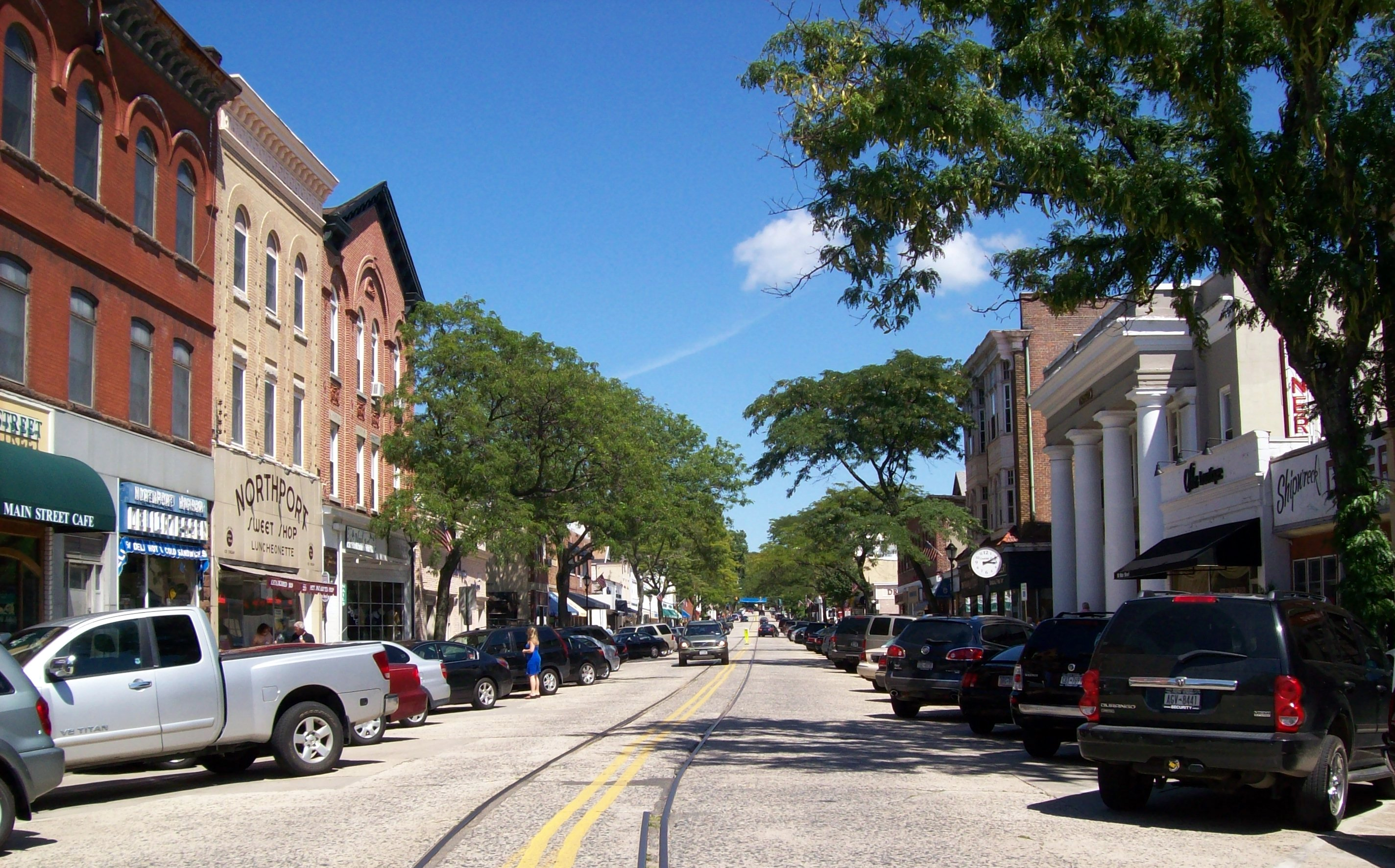
- Main Street in Northport, just east of Woodbine and Bayview Avenues

- Location within Suffolk County

- Location on Long Island Location within the state of New York
- Coordinates: 40°54′10″N 73°20′39″W
- Country: United States
- State: New York
- County: Suffolk
- Town: Huntington
- Settled: 1656
- Incorporated: 1894

Government
  - Type: Incorporated Village
  - Mayor: Donna Koch
  - Deputy Mayor: Richard Boziwick
  - Trustees: James Izzo; Monica Zenyuh; David Weber, Jr.
  - Justice: Hon. Brian A. Trodden

Area
  - Total: 2.53 sq mi (6.55 km^{2})
  - Land: 2.30 sq mi (5.96 km^{2})
  - Water: 0.23 sq mi (0.59 km^{2})
- Elevation: 0–59 ft (0–18 m)

Population (2020)
  - Total: 7,347
  - Density: 3,190.1/sq mi (1,231.71/km^{2})
- Time zone: UTC-5 (EST)
  - Summer (DST): UTC-4 (EDT)
- ZIP Code: 11768
- Area codes: 631, 934
- FIPS code: 36-53396
- GNIS feature ID: 0958968
- Website: northportny.gov

Northport is a village located within the Town of Huntington in Suffolk County, on the North Shore of Long Island, New York, United States. The population was 7,347 at the time of the 2020 census.

Initially designated Great Cow Harbour by 17th-century English colonists, the area was officially renamed Northport in 1837. In 1894, in an effort to localize governance, the community was incorporated as a village.

The Incorporated Village of Northport is known for its Victorian-era village center, still bearing trolley rails from a long-discontinued streetcar line which transported village residents to the Long Island Rail Road station in East Northport. The village Main Street runs from the Village Green along the harborfront to the former hamlet of Vernon Valley, which has since been absorbed by the neighboring hamlet of East Northport.

== History ==
=== European settlement ===
The original inhabitants of the area now known as Northport were the Matinecocks, one of 13 Native American tribes of Long Island. The Matinecocks called this land Opcathontyche, which meant "wading place creek". After Dutch interest a few years earlier, the land was sold by Chief Asharoken, head of the Matinecocks, to three Englishmen in 1656.

With land that was well suited for farming, the early settlers grazed cattle on pastures around the harbor. The area soon became known as Great Cow Harbour. (The nearby hamlet of Centerport was known as Little Cow Harbour.) The oldest house still standing in Northport, the Skidmore House on Main Street, was built in 1761. In 2009 the house was put up for sale, sparking the village to pass a historical preservation law.

=== Growth, change, and shipbuilding ===
Woodbine Avenue and Northport Harbor, circa 1900

In the early 19th century, Great Cow Harbor was still a rural farming community. By the 1830s, the village contained only eight dwellings. But a new industry of shipbuilding brought rapid change and growth. The village shifted away from its farming roots as shipbuilding became the community's primary industry. By 1837, the village was being referred to as Northport.

The 1860 census listed Northport's population at 1,016. By 1874, it had become the most flourishing village on Long Island's North Shore, with three ship yards, five sets of marine railways, two hotels, and at least six general stores.

Northport's shipbuilding boom lasted fifty years, but waned at the end of the century as steel-hulled ships began replacing the wooden vessels produced in the village.

=== Railroads and trolleys ===
Main Street, sometime between 1902 and 1909

On April 25, 1868, the Long Island Rail Road opened a station within the village of Northport. This was an essential transportation link for the village, especially for the growing commuter population. However, just a few years later the LIRR decided to move the Northport station to a new location in Larkfield to facilitate further railway extension to Port Jefferson. The new railway station located on Larkfield Road was opened on January 13, 1873, and retained the station name of Northport.

To avoid confusion with the former station located in the village of Northport, train conductors would refer to the station in Larkfield as "East of Northport" because the station was located east of the Northport railway junction which directed trains north to the station located in the village. Despite the fact that Larkfield was primarily south of Northport, the area became known thereafter as East Northport. The original rail spur to Northport was afterwards known as the Northport Branch. After the old village station closed in 1899, Northport decided to build a 2.5-mile (4.0 km) trolley line to take commuters between Main Street and the new Northport station located in Larkfield. The new commuter trolley opened in mid-April 1902. The increasing usage of the automobile led the trolley to make its last scheduled commuter run on August 19, 1924.

=== Incorporation and annexation ===
Although it was known by the name of Northport since at least 1837, the village of Northport was not formally incorporated until 1894, becoming the first village in the Town of Huntington to do so. Over the years Northport has expanded from its original borders, annexing other established communities.

Around the Revolutionary War, a concentration of 31 families began settling 1.5 miles (2.4 km) east of Northport, around where Main Street and Route 25A now intersect 40.8995°N 73.3296°W. This settlement was originally known as Red Hook and changed names to Vernon Valley in 1820. By 1874 Vernon Valley had a population of around 150 inhabitants. Vernon Valley became part of Northport in the mid-20th century.

Northport also annexed the formerly independent settlement of Crab Meadow 40.9207°N 73.3202°W (once known as Great Neck), as well as western parts of the Freshpond community 40.9224°N 73.2965°W.

=== Modern Northport ===
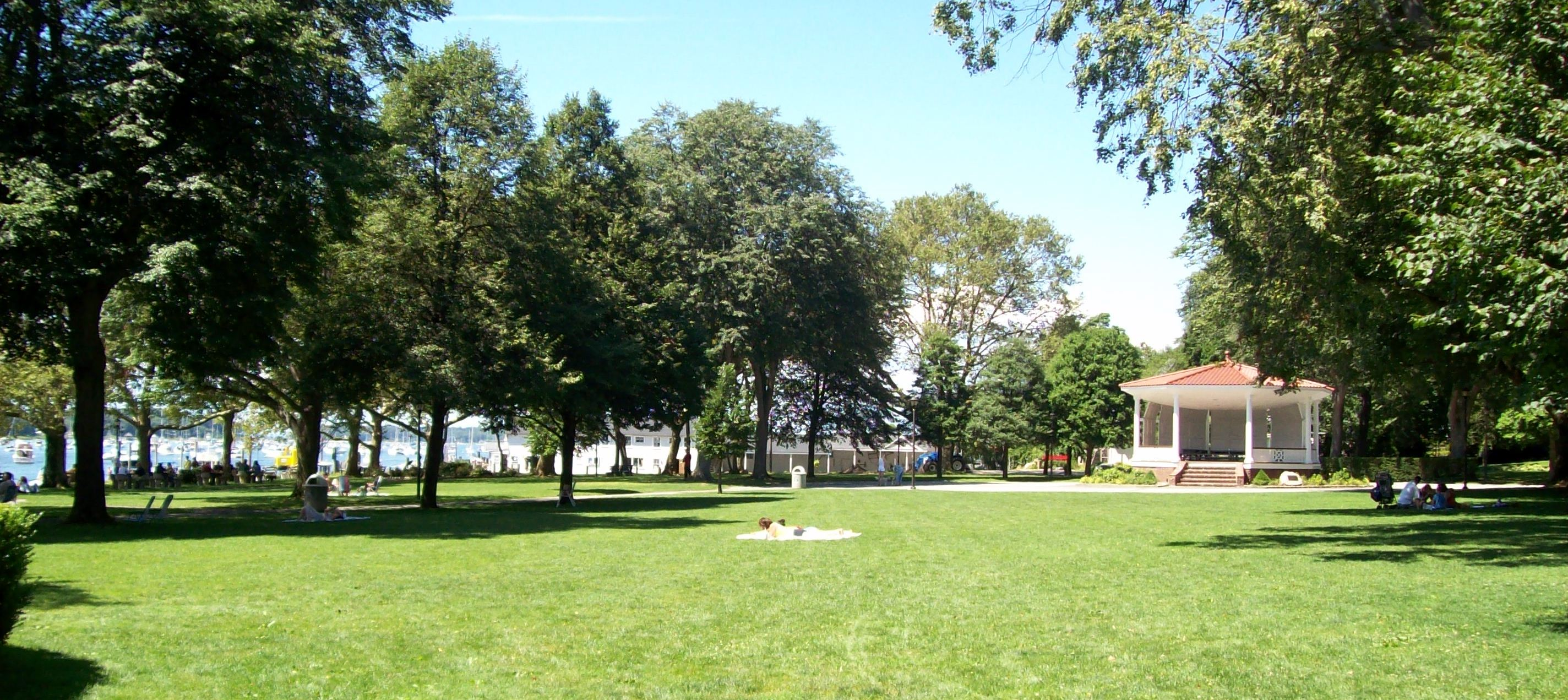
Northport Memorial Park at the edge of Northport Harbor

By the 1920s, after nearly a century of heavy commercial use, the waterfront which had supported the community for generations had fallen into decay. The village decided to purchase the land along the harbor and created Northport Memorial Park in 1932, which is a defining feature of Northport today.

In 1967, the Long Island Lighting Company (LILCO) opened the Northport Power Station, currently the largest oil-fired electric generating station on the East Coast. The four large stacks are a well-known landmark that can be seen from as far away as Connecticut across Long Island Sound. Each stack is 600 feet (180 m) tall.

The Northport Trolley, which had ceased operations in 1924, enjoyed a popular revival in the 1970s and 1980s, transporting weekend tourists along Main Street. Unlike the original electric trolleys, this nostalgic replica was horse driven. It also ran on rubber automobile tires rather than utilizing the original rails which still remain a visible element of Main Street to this day.

In July 1984, Northport garnered nationwide media attention for being the site of the gruesome murder of 17-year-old Gary Lauwers by his friend, high school dropout and alleged devil-worshiper Ricky Kasso. The events made national headlines and have since been recounted in books and movies, which caused the village to suffer a negative reputation for reputed satanism.

Every September, the village of Northport commemorates its rich history with the celebration of Cow Harbor Day, which follows the annual Great Cow Harbor 10K race.

== Geography ==
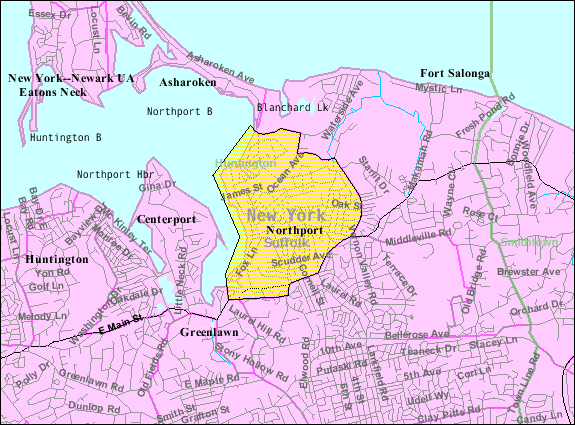
U.S. Census map of Northport

According to the United States Census Bureau, the village has a total area of 2.5 square miles (6.5 km^{2}), of which 2.3 square miles (6.0 km^{2}) is land and 0.2 square miles (0.52 km^{2}), or 9.02%, is water.

Most of the village is made up of the low, steep hills of the Harbor Hill Moraine. To the west is the highly sheltered Northport Harbor, to the north is Long Island Sound, and to the east are woods and marshland.

A prominent feature of Northport is Steer's Pit (known simply as "The Pit" to locals), a large land depression carved into the cliffs adjacent to Northport Harbor and just south of the Northport Power Station's prominent smokestacks. This unusual geographic feature is the result of sand mining operations by the Steers and Steers Company. Mining began in 1923 and ceased in the 1950s. The mined sand was shipped by barge to New York City where, mixed with Portland cement and rock aggregate, it became the sidewalks of New York. The area has since been utilized for home and condo use, and a portion of the Pit is a park used by local youth soccer and baseball leagues. The Northport Fire Department maintains a training facility in the Pit that is the site of the annual fireman's fair in the summer.

=== Greater Northport Area ===
Greater Northport consists of two villages, three unincorporated hamlets, as well as two former hamlets

- Northport
- East Northport
- Asharoken
- Eatons Neck
- Vernon Valley
- Fort Salonga
- Crab Meadow

== Demographics ==
Historical population
Census	Pop.	Note	%±
1870	1,060		—
1880	1,381		30.3%
1900	1,794		—
1910	2,096		16.8%
1920	1,977		−5.7%
1930	2,523		27.6%
1940	3,093		22.6%
1950	3,859		24.8%
1960	5,972		54.8%
1970	7,494		25.5%
1980	7,651		2.1%
1990	7,572		−1.0%
2000	7,606		0.4%
2010	7,401		−2.7%
2020	7,347		−0.7%
2021 (est.)	7,344	▼	0.0%
U.S. Decennial Census

As of the 2020 United States census, the village had 7,347 people, 2,906 households, and 1,926 families.

As of the 2010 United States census, there were 7,401 people, 2,955 households, and 2,074 families residing in the village. The population density was 3,290.0 inhabitants per square mile (1,270.3/km^{2}). There were 3,052 housing units at an average density of 1,320.0 per square mile (509.7/km^{2}). The racial makeup of the village was 92.04% White, 2.59% African American, 0.05% Native American, 1.25% Asian, 0.01% Pacific Islander, 0.30% from other races, and 0.75% from two or more races. Hispanic or Latino of any race were 5.09% of the population.

There were 2,955 households, out of which 33.2% had children under the age of 18 living with them, 59.8% were married couples living together, 8.5% had a female householder with no husband present, and 29.9% were non-families. 25.9% of all households were made up of individuals, and 8.0% had someone living alone who was 65 years of age or older. The average household size was 2.55 and the average family size was 3.07.

In the village, the population was spread out, with 23.8% under the age of 18, 5.8% from 18 to 24, 30.1% from 25 to 44, 28.8% from 45 to 64, and 12.1% who were 65 years of age or older. The median age was 40 years. For every 100 females, there were 94.6 males. For every 100 females aged 18 and over, there were 91.6 males.

The median income for a household in the village was $90,250, and the median income for a family was $104,488. Males had a median income of $78,715 versus $50,119 for females. The per capita income for the village was $43,694. About 1.6% of families and 2.8% of the population were below the poverty line, including 3.7% of those under age 18 and 2.8% of those age 65 or over.

== Government ==
The Village of Northport is governed by the five-member Village of Northport Board of Trustees, consisting of an elected Mayor and four Village Trustees – one of whom is appointed annually by the Mayor to serve as Deputy Mayor.

As of October 2026, the Mayor of Northport is Donna M. Koch.

The village is additionally serviced by the Northport Volunteer Fire Department and its own municipal police department.

=== Police department ===
The Northport Village Police Department, established in 1929, employs 17 full-time officers and conducts all patrol and arrest processing and most investigations and training in-house (the Suffolk County Police Department assists in specialized cases). The police department also has a marine unit which patrols the waterways.

== Education ==
The village is primarily served by the Northport-East Northport Union Free School District – although a portion of the village's southwestern corner is within the Harborfields Central School District. Accordingly, children who reside within Northport and attend public schools go to school in one of these two districts depending on where they live in the village.

== Arts and culture ==
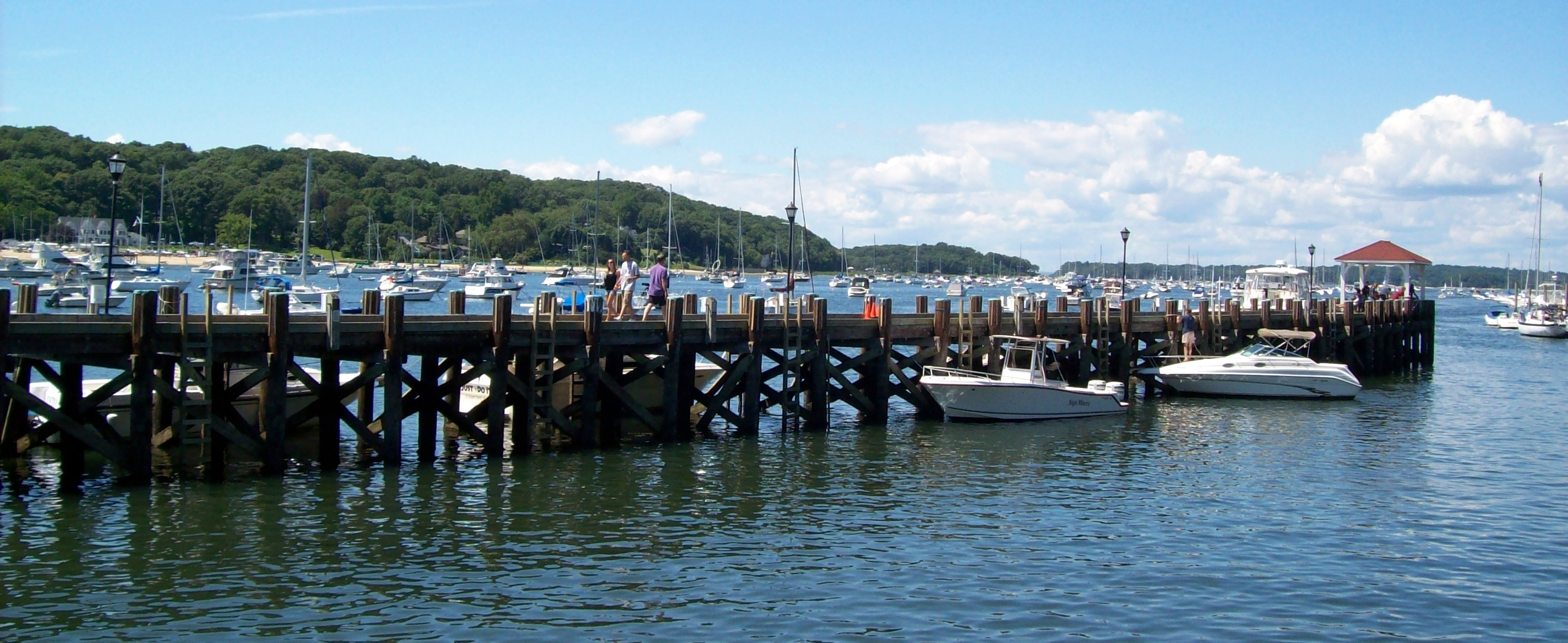
Northport Village Dock in Northport Harbor

Northport's annual Cow Harbor Day festival celebrates the history of the village, previously known as Great Cow Harbor. It is held annually on the Sunday of the third full weekend in September, and since 1977 following the Great Cow Harbor 10K held the day before. Cow Harbor Day draws thousands of visitors to Northport each September. Events kick off with a parade down Main Street, featuring floats, the local Northport High School marching band, antique cars and a temporary resurrection of the trolley that was once commonplace along this route in the early 1900s. Bovine related costumes and floats are also a common theme. Celebrations are held at Northport Memorial Park at the harbor's edge. live music, boat races, and other attractions. For the past thirteen years, the parade has been led by the US Coast Guard and Coast Guard Auxiliary Band from the local Ft. Salonga, NY Flotilla. Each year an appearance is made by the Regimental Band of the United States Merchant Marine Academy in Kings Point.

== Notable people ==
=== Artists ===
- Jules Olitski, painter, sculptor

=== Performing arts ===
- Robert Burke, actor (Law & Order)
- Edie Falco, Broadway, movie, and television actress best known for her role as Carmela Soprano on The Sopranos
- Alison Fanelli, actress who is best known for her role on the television series The Adventures of Pete & Pete
- Jordan Firstman, actor best known for his role on English Teacher
- Elizabeth Hendrickson, television actress best known for her role as twin sisters Frankie and Maggie Stone on All My Children
- Patti LuPone, Tony Award-winning Broadway and television actress, best known for her role as Eva Peron in Evita
- Marcia Marcia Marcia, drag queen best known for RuPaul's Drag Race (season 15)
- Chris Messina, television actor, best known for his role as Danny Castellano on The Mindy Project
- Dan Milano, television writer and voice actor best known as the co-creator of the show Greg the Bunny
- Gretchen Rau, Academy Award-winning motion picture set decorator
- John Scurti, television actor best known for his role as Kenny Shea on Rescue Me
- Craig Ricci Shaynak, television character actor

==== Musicians ====
- Wendy Andreiev (Wendy Wild), lead vocalist in the 1980s for several New York–based bands
- Ian Matthias Bavitz (Aesop Rock), hip-hop, rap artist
- Brendan B. Brown, lead vocalist for the band Wheatus
- Peter Calandra, Broadway, movie, and television pianist/composer
- Frank Funaro, drummer for Cracker
- Steve Nardelli, singer and songwriter with The Syn
- Bassam Saba, musician and co-founder of the New York Arabic Orchestra
- Wheatus, band

=== Writers ===
- Antoine de Saint-Exupéry, wrote Le Petit Prince (The Little Prince) during the summer of 1942 in The Bevin Mansion in Asharoken.
- Edwin G. Burrows, won the 1999 Pulitzer Prize for History for the book Gotham: A History of New York City to 1898
- Arda Collins, poet and winner of the Yale Younger Poets Prize.
- Greg Fox, nationally syndicated comic strip artist/writer (his comic Kyle's Bed & Breakfast takes place in Northport)
- Jack Kerouac, Beat novelist and writer commonly credited as the catalyst for the 1960s counterculture movement

=== Sports ===
- Keith Beach, soccer player
- Michael Brannigan, Paralympic track and field runner
- Bobby Brennan, soccer player
- Greg Buttle, former NFL football player for the New York Jets
- Darius Kasparaitis, former NHL ice hockey player for the New York Islanders, Pittsburgh Penguins, Colorado Avalanche and the New York Rangers
- Andy Lally, United SportsCar Championship, GRAND-AM and NASCAR race car driver, and street luge racer
- Allie Long, U.S. Olympic soccer player
- Audrey Shin, figure skater

=== Others ===
- Nicholas Allard (born 1952), Dean and President of Brooklyn Law School.
- Andrew Geller, architect
- Ricky Kasso, murderer
- Bruce Morrison, former United States congressman from Connecticut. He grew up in Northport and attended Northport High School.
- Alia Sabur, youngest professor in history

== See also ==
- List of municipalities in New York
- East Northport, New York
