= St. Paul's Lutheran School =

Location
- 106 Vernon Valley Road; East Northport, New York; United States; 40.882501°N 73.325184°W

Information
- Type: Private elementary school
- Religious affiliation: Lutheranism
- Established: 1970; 56 years ago
- Principal: Margaret Anderson
- Campus: Suburban
- Website: stpaulseastnorthport.org/our-campus/the-school-house

St. Paul's Lutheran Elementary School was a private Lutheran elementary school in East Northport, New York. It was a member of the Long Island Lutheran Middle and High School Congregation Association. It shut its doors in 2018 and was rebranded as the school house.
