= Oakleaf Lake =

Lake in the state of Minnesota, United States

- Location within Minnesota
- Location: Nicollet County, Minnesota
- Coordinates: 44°18′29″N 94°0′56″W
- Type: lakes

Oakleaf Lake is a lake in Nicollet County, in the U.S. state of Minnesota.

Oakleaf Lake was named for H. J. Eckloff, an early settler, his surname Eckloff meaning "oak leaf" in the Swedish language.

== See also ==
- List of lakes in Minnesota
