= Coast Guard Station Eatons Neck =

US Coast Guard station in New York

- Eatons Neck Light
- U.S. National Register of Historic Places
- Location within New York
- Location: Eatons Neck Point at Huntington Bay and Long Island Sound off NY 25A, Huntington, New York
- Coordinates: 40°57′12.97″N 73°23′49.17″W
- Area: 10 acres (4.0 ha)
- Built: 1798
- Architect: McComb, John, Jr.
- NRHP reference No.: 73001273
- Added to NRHP: April 3, 1973

Coast Guard Station Eatons Neck is a United States Coast Guard station located on the northern tip of Eatons Neck on Long Island, New York. It is the oldest Coast Guard Station in New York and the fourth oldest in the United States. It was founded in 1849 by the New York Lifesaving Benevolent Association.

The Eatons Neck Lighthouse is on the grounds of the station. Eatons Neck Lighthouse is the second oldest lighthouse on Long Island and the sixth oldest in the United States. First established in 1799, the present tower on a bluff stands 126 feet above sea level and shows a fixed white light from its Third Order Fresnel lens. The tower was placed on the National Register of Historic Places in 1973.

Since June 2019, Station Eatons Neck is commanded by BMCS Erich White. BMC John Lowell serves as the Executive Petty Officer, MKC White serves as the Engineer Petty Officer and BMC J. Quincy Lawton serves as the Senior Enlisted Reserve Advisor (SERA). Station Eatons Neck has a complement of Active Duty, Reserves and Auxiliarists. The equipment consists of 45-foot (14 m) and 29-foot (8.8 m) boats and a radio station that is constantly staffed.

The Station stands watch over the middle portion of Long Island Sound from the Port Jefferson–Bridgeport line to just east of New York City and guards the City's back door maritime entrance as well as providing assistance to local boaters.

The station has family housing and Unaccompanied Personnel Housing.
