= East Northport, New York =

- Hamlet and census-designated place
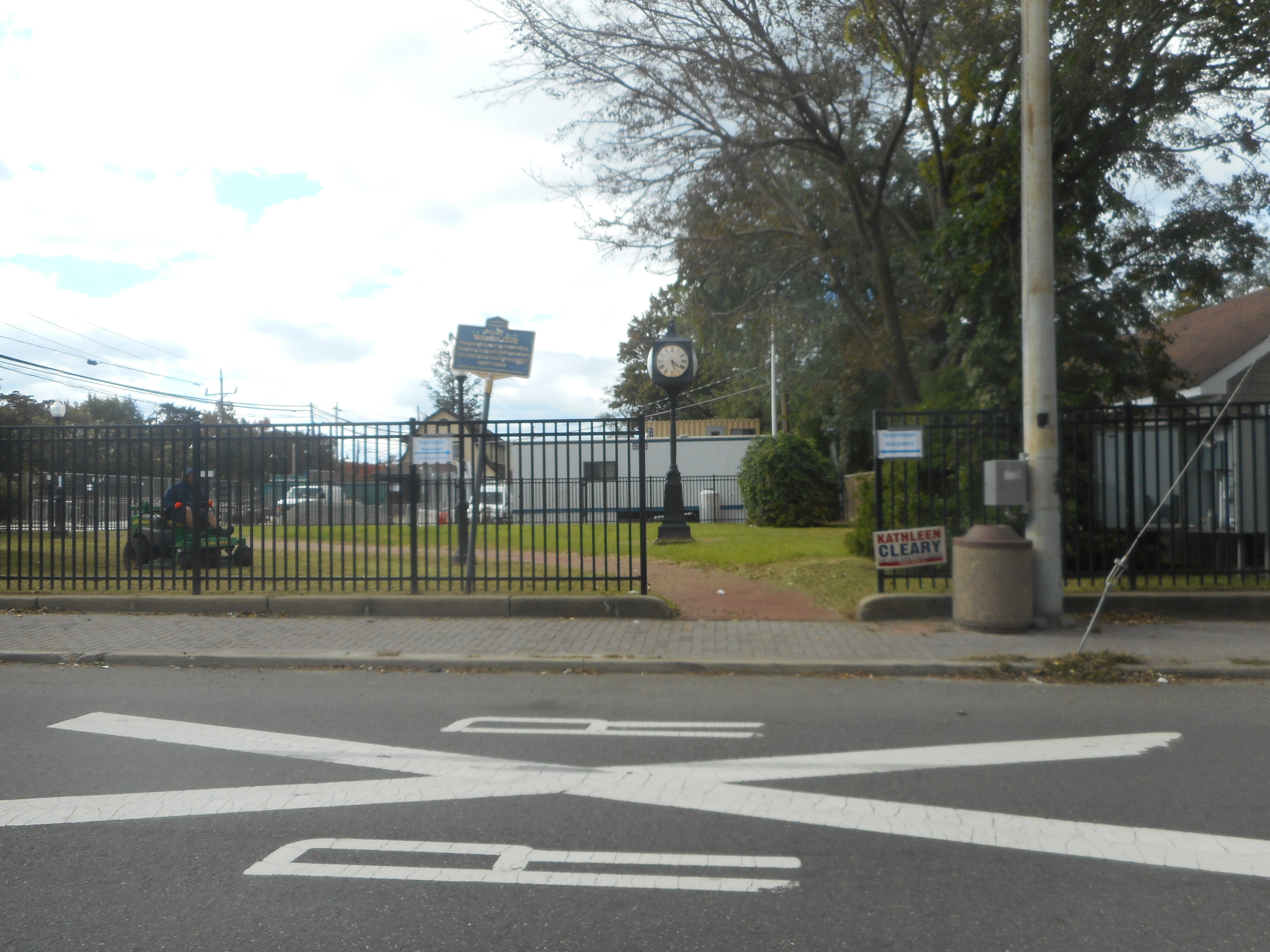
- Town green at the former Northport Traction trolley stop on Larkfield Road

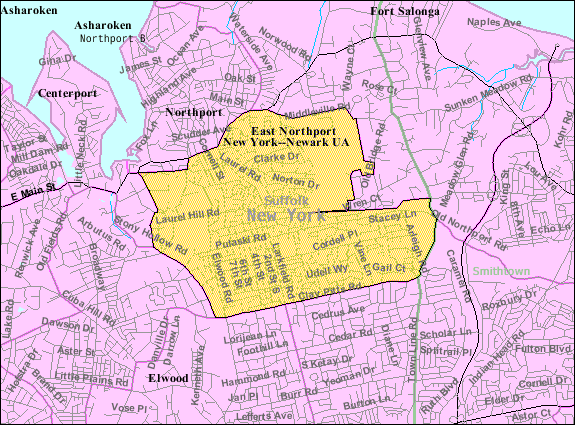
- U.S. Census map

- Location on Long Island Location within the state of New York
- Coordinates: 40°52′45″N 73°19′27″W
- Country: United States
- State: New York
- County: Suffolk
- Town: Huntington

Area
  - Total: 5.15 sq mi (13.35 km^{2})
  - Land: 5.15 sq mi (13.35 km^{2})
  - Water: 0 sq mi (0.00 km^{2})
- Elevation: 223 ft (68 m)

Population (2020)
  - Total: 20,048
  - Density: 3,889.2/sq mi (1,501.63/km^{2})
- Time zone: UTC−5 (Eastern (EST))
  - Summer (DST): UTC−4 (EDT)
- ZIP Code: 11731
- Area codes: 631, 934
- FIPS code: 36-22612
- GNIS feature ID: 0949189

East Northport is a hamlet and census-designated place (CDP) located within the Town of Huntington in Suffolk County, on Long Island, New York, United States. The population was 20,048 at the time of the 2020 census.

== History ==
=== Founding ===
Soon after the establishment of a village in the Huntington area, English settlers sought to further expand their territory. On July 30, 1656, land was purchased from Chief Asharoken, head of the Matinecock Native American tribe. Portions of that land included the area that would eventually become East Northport.

=== Larkfield and Clay Pitts ===
Two distinct communities formed in the area now known as East Northport. The more populous settlement known as Larkfield was located on the northern side, near Vernon Valley (now part of Northport). Larkfield originally developed near the location of Genola Cemetery, just north of the modern-day junction of Larkfield Road, Vernon Valley Road, and Laurel Road. A second community located on the southern side was known as Clay Pitts, named for its vast deposits of red clay. This clay, which had been used by Native Americans to form pottery, was used by the Europeans to form bricks for construction. The land between Larkfield and Clay Pitts was well suited for agriculture, and the region prospered in the late 18th century as a thriving farming community by supplying produce to markets in New York City and Brooklyn.

=== East Northport ===
In 1868 the Long Island Rail Road opened a station within the Village of Northport. However, just a few years later the LIRR decided to move the Northport station to a new location in Larkfield to facilitate further railway extension to Port Jefferson. The new railway station located at Larkfield Road and Bellerose Avenue opened on January 13, 1873. Although the station retained the name of Northport, train conductors would refer to it as "East of Northport", because the station was located east of the railway junction which used to direct trains north to the old station located in the Village of Northport. Despite the fact that East Northport is primarily south of Northport, the area became known thereafter as East Northport. The Larkfield Post Office formally changed its name to East Northport in 1910. As Americans returned home from World War II, Long Island experienced a dramatic population shift from large cities to suburban areas. East Northport's population soared as a housing boom transformed the rural farmland into modern suburbs.

On August 11, 1989, FBI Informant Robert Kubecka and his brother-in-law Donald Barstow were murdered inside their Brightside Avenue office by Lucchese Family soldiers Rocco Vitulli and Frank "Frankie the Pearl" Federico, on orders of Capo Salvatore Avellino, with the blessing of then-Lucchesse underboss Anthony 'Gaspipe' Casso. Information provided by Kubecka had been used as part of the infamous Mafia Commission Trial in 1985–1986.

In 1998, East Northport's United States Post Office building was renamed the Jerome Anthony Ambro, Jr. Post Office Building through a bill passed by the United States Congress, in honor of the former congressman for New York's Third congressional district.

As of 2025, East Northport is the largest community in the town of Huntington, by land area, and third in population behind Huntington Station and Dix Hills.

== Geography ==
According to the United States Census Bureau, the CDP has a total area of 5.2 square miles (13.4 km^{2}), all land.

== Demographics ==
Historical population
Census	Pop.	Note	%±
2000	20,845		—
2010	20,217		−3.0%
2020	20,048		−0.8%
U.S. Decennial Census

=== 2020 census ===
As of the 2020 census, East Northport had a population of 20,048. The median age was 44.4 years. 20.5% of residents were under the age of 18 and 18.0% of residents were 65 years of age or older. For every 100 females there were 96.3 males, and for every 100 females age 18 and over there were 93.3 males age 18 and over.

100.0% of residents lived in urban areas, while 0.0% lived in rural areas.

There were 6,996 households in East Northport, of which 31.9% had children under the age of 18 living in them. Of all households, 59.5% were married-couple households, 13.4% were households with a male householder and no spouse or partner present, and 22.4% were households with a female householder and no spouse or partner present. About 19.1% of all households were made up of individuals and 10.2% had someone living alone who was 65 years of age or older.

There were 7,246 housing units, of which 3.5% were vacant. The homeowner vacancy rate was 0.8% and the rental vacancy rate was 4.8%.

Racial composition as of the 2020 census
Race	Number	Percent
White	17,026	84.9%
Black or African American	222	1.1%
American Indian and Alaska Native	38	0.2%
Asian	601	3.0%
Native Hawaiian and Other Pacific Islander	2	0.0%
Some other race	691	3.4%
Two or more races	1,468	7.3%
Hispanic or Latino (of any race)	2,120	10.6%

=== 2010 census ===
As of the census of 2010, there were 20,217 people, 7,114 households, and 5,467 families residing in the CDP. The population density was 3,887.9 inhabitants per square mile (1,501.1/km^{2}). There were 7,288 housing units at an average density of 1,401.5 per square mile (541.1/km^{2}). The racial makeup of the CDP was 93.1% White, 0.8% African American, 0.05% Native American, 2.8% Asian, 0.05% Pacific Islander, 1.7% some other race, and 1.4% from two or more races. Hispanic or Latino of any race were 6.7% of the population.

There were 7,114 households, out of which 39.0% had children under the age of 18 living with them, 62.9% were headed by married couples living together, 10.1% had a female householder with no husband present, and 23.2% were non-families. 18.8% of all households were made up of individuals, and 9.1% were someone living alone who was 65 years of age or older. The average household size was 2.84, and the average family size was 3.22.

In the CDP, the population was spread out, with 25.5% under the age of 18, 6.3% from 18 to 24, 23.8% from 25 to 44, 30.4% from 45 to 64, and 13.9% who were 65 years of age or older. The median age was 41.8 years. For every 100 females, there were 97.8 males. For every 100 females age 18 and over, there were 93.7 males.

=== 2009–2011 American Community Survey ===
For the period between 2009 and 2011, the annual median income for a household in the CDP was an estimated $101,058. Males had a median income of $81,472 versus $55,403 for females. The per capita income for the CDP was $39,766. About 1.5% of families and 3.2% of the population were below the poverty line, including 2.4% of those under age 18 and 8.3% of those age 65 or over.

== Education ==
Students residing in the CDP of East Northport attend the Northport-East Northport Union Free School District.

The following schools are located within East Northport or have an East Northport mailing address:

=== Public schools ===
- East Northport Middle School
- Fifth Avenue Elementary School
- Pulaski Road School
- Northport High School

=== Private/religious schools ===
- St. Paul's Lutheran School (Lutheran K-5)
- Trinity Regional School (Catholic K-8)

== Fire protection ==
East Northport is protected by the East Northport fire department. There are three stations one on Clay Pitts road, Laurel Road and another on Larkfield Rd at 9th Avenue in East Northport.

== Notable people ==
- Allison Black, military officer
- Luke Petrasek, Polish-American basketball player
- Patti LuPone, singer, actor
- Robert John Burke, actor
- John Scurti, actor
- Joseph "Joe C". Caridi, current consigliere of the Lucchese crime family
- Eugene Gearty, Academy Award-winner for Sound
- Joseph Jesselli, luthier and guitar craftsman
- Ashley Massaro, former World Wrestling Entertainment (WWE) diva
- Steve Park, NASCAR driver
- Andrew Lichtenberger, poker player
- Anthony Cumia, talk show host (Opie & Anthony)
- Bud Harrelson, baseball player and coach, died in East Northport in 2024
