= Asharoken, New York =

- Village
- Incorporated Village of Asharoken
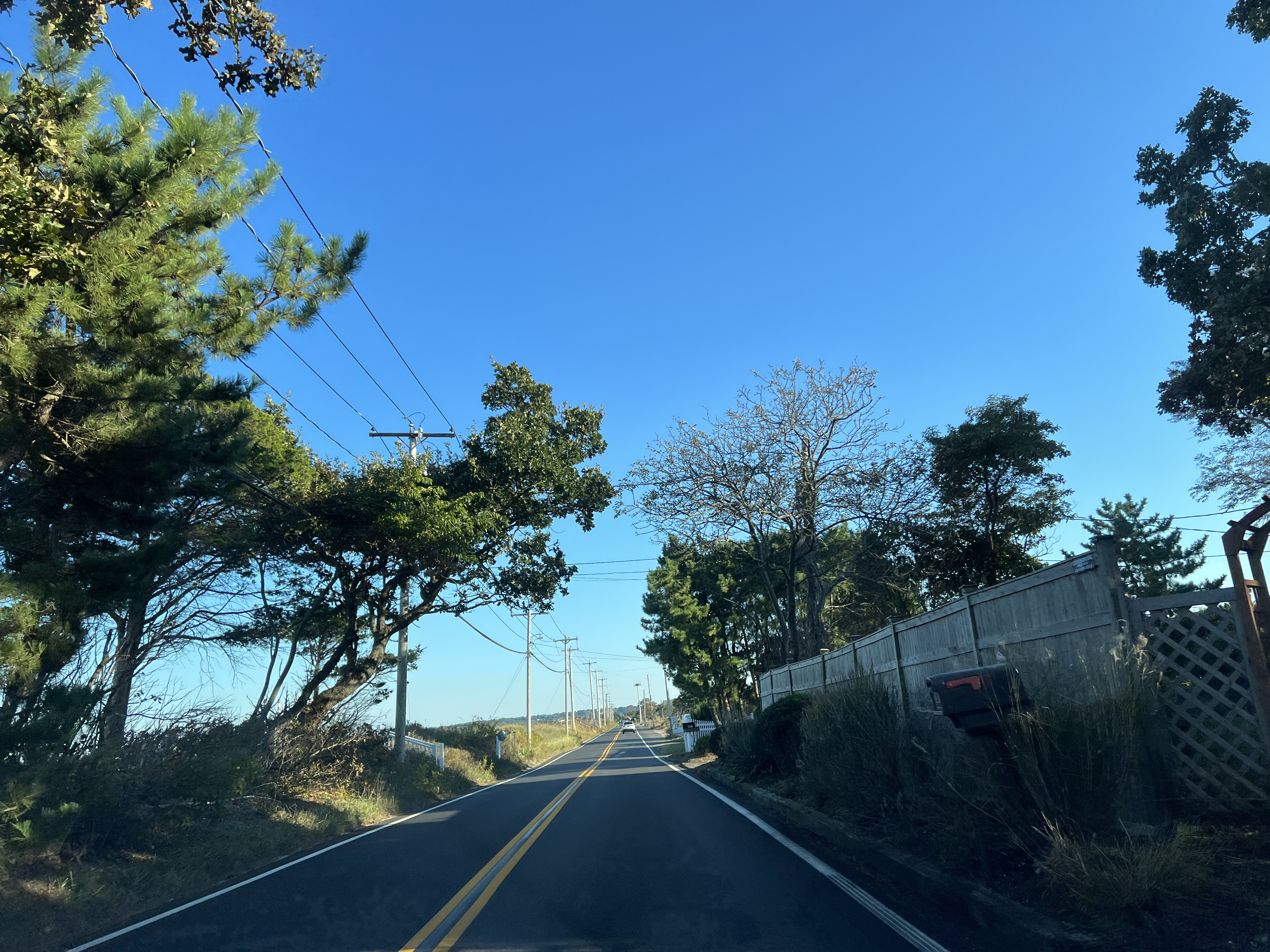
- Asharoken Road within the village in 2022

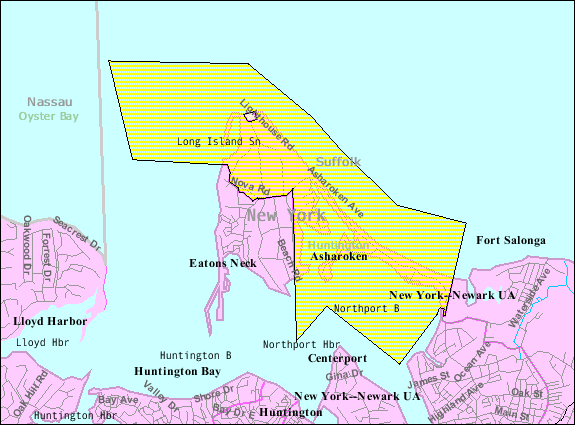
- U.S. Census map of Asharoken

- Location on Long Island Location within the state of New York
- Coordinates: 40°56′15″N 73°23′0″W
- Country: United States
- State: New York
- County: Suffolk
- Town: Huntington
- Incorporated: 1925
- Named for: Chief Asharoken

Government
  - Mayor: Gregory Letica

Area
  - Total: 6.49 sq mi (16.80 km^{2})
  - Land: 1.42 sq mi (3.68 km^{2})
  - Water: 5.06 sq mi (13.11 km^{2})
- Elevation: 13 ft (4 m)

Population (2020)
  - Total: 592
  - Density: 416.2/sq mi (160.71/km^{2})
- Time zone: UTC-5 (Eastern (EST))
  - Summer (DST): UTC-4 (EDT)
- ZIP Code: 11768
- Area codes: 631, 934
- FIPS code: 36-02737
- GNIS feature ID: 0942621
- Website: asharoken.com/index.htm

Asharoken (also known historically as Asharoken Beach) is a village in the Town of Huntington in Suffolk County, on the North Shore of Long Island in New York. It is considered part of the Greater Northport area, which is anchored by the Incorporated Village of Northport. The population was 592 at the time of the 2020 census.

The Eaton’s Neck Lighthouse is located near the northern tip of the village.

== History ==
The location of Asharoken was originally inhabited by Native Americans. In 1656, European colonists began to settle the area.

Historically, Asharoken was part of the hamlet of Eatons Neck, and was known as Asharoken Beach.

Asharoken incorporated as a village in 1925, so to have a greater ability to control local beaches and roadways through home rule, and to limit the local sand and gravel mining activities and their impacts on the community and its environment – operations that were widespread at the time along the shoreline in the vicinity of Asharoken, Eatons Neck, and Northport.

=== Etymology ===
The Village of Asharoken is named after Chief Asharoken, head of the Matinecock Native American tribe which inhabited the area prior to English settlements. Chief Asharoken sold the land that is now Asharoken, Eatons Neck, and Northport to European settlers in 1656.

== Geography ==
According to the United States Census Bureau, the village has a total area of 6.5 square miles (17 km^{2}), of which 1.4 square miles (3.6 km^{2}) is land and 5.1 square miles (13 km^{2}), or 78.92%, is water.

The village limits enclose part of Eatons Neck and a long, low, narrow isthmus (itself referred to as Asharoken) connecting Northport in the southeast to Eaton's Neck in the northwest, and separating Northport Bay from Long Island Sound.

== Demographics ==
Historical population
Census	Pop.	Note	%±
1930	98		—
1940	48		−51.0%
1950	116		141.7%
1960	253		118.1%
1970	540		113.4%
1980	635		17.6%
1990	807		27.1%
2000	625		−22.6%
2010	654		4.6%
2020	592		−9.5%
U.S. Decennial Census

As of the census of 2000, there were 625 people, 254 households, and 184 families residing in the village. The population density was 457.4 inhabitants per square mile (176.6/km^{2}). There were 307 housing units at an average density of 224.7 per square mile (86.8/km^{2}). The racial makeup of the village was 96.64% White Caucasian, 0.16% Black African American, 2.72% Asian, 0.16% Pacific Islander, 0.32% from other races. Hispanic or Latino of any race were 1.92% of the population.

There were 254 households, out of which 22.8% had children under the age of 18 living with them, 66.5% were married couples living together, 4.7% had a female householder with no husband present, and 27.2% were non-families. 22.8% of all households were made up of individuals, and 9.1% had someone living alone who was 65 years of age or older. The average household size was 2.45 and the average family size was 2.87.

In the village, the population was spread out, with 18.1% under the age of 18, 4.6% from 18 to 24, 19.5% from 25 to 44, 39.7% from 45 to 64, and 18.1% who were 65 years of age or older. The median age was 48 years. For every 100 females, there were 108.3 males. For every 100 females age 18 and over, there were 101.6 males.

The median income for a household in the village was $103,262, and the median income for a family was $118,128. Males had a median income of $81,644 versus $41,406 for females. The per capita income for the village was $51,159. None of the families and 2.6% of the population were living below the poverty line, including nobody under 18 and 4.1% of those over 64.

== Notable people ==
- Marlene Dietrich – actress and singer.
- Jackie Gleason – comedian who spent many summers here.
- Rube Goldberg – cartoonist lived here most of his life.
- Bud Harrelson – starting shortstop for the 1969 Miracle Mets.
- Fiorello LaGuardia – Attorney and politician who served as the 100th Mayor of New York City and as a United Nations official; had a vacation home in Asharoken.
- Eugene O'Neill – playwright, in 1931.
- Antoine de Saint-Exupéry – author of The Little Prince, written at Delamater-Bevin Mansion in Asharoken in 1942.

== Asharoken Police Department ==
The Village of Asharoken maintains its own police force, paid for predominantly by property taxes on village residents. Over the years Asharoken has earned a reputation for being tough on speeders. In 2003 the four-man Asharoken Police Department issued 1,000 tickets for speeding violations, a rate over 40 times greater than neighboring towns with significantly greater populations. Though the population of Asharoken has changed little in recent years, as of 2009 the police force increased to 11 officers, a supervising officer-in-charge, five cars and a boat patrolling land and water.

The police department took possession of a new marine vessel in December 2010.

== See also ==
- List of municipalities in New York
- Delamater-Bevin Mansion
- Eaton Harbors Corporation
