= Eatons Neck, New York =

Eaton's Neck, New York
- Hamlet and census-designated place
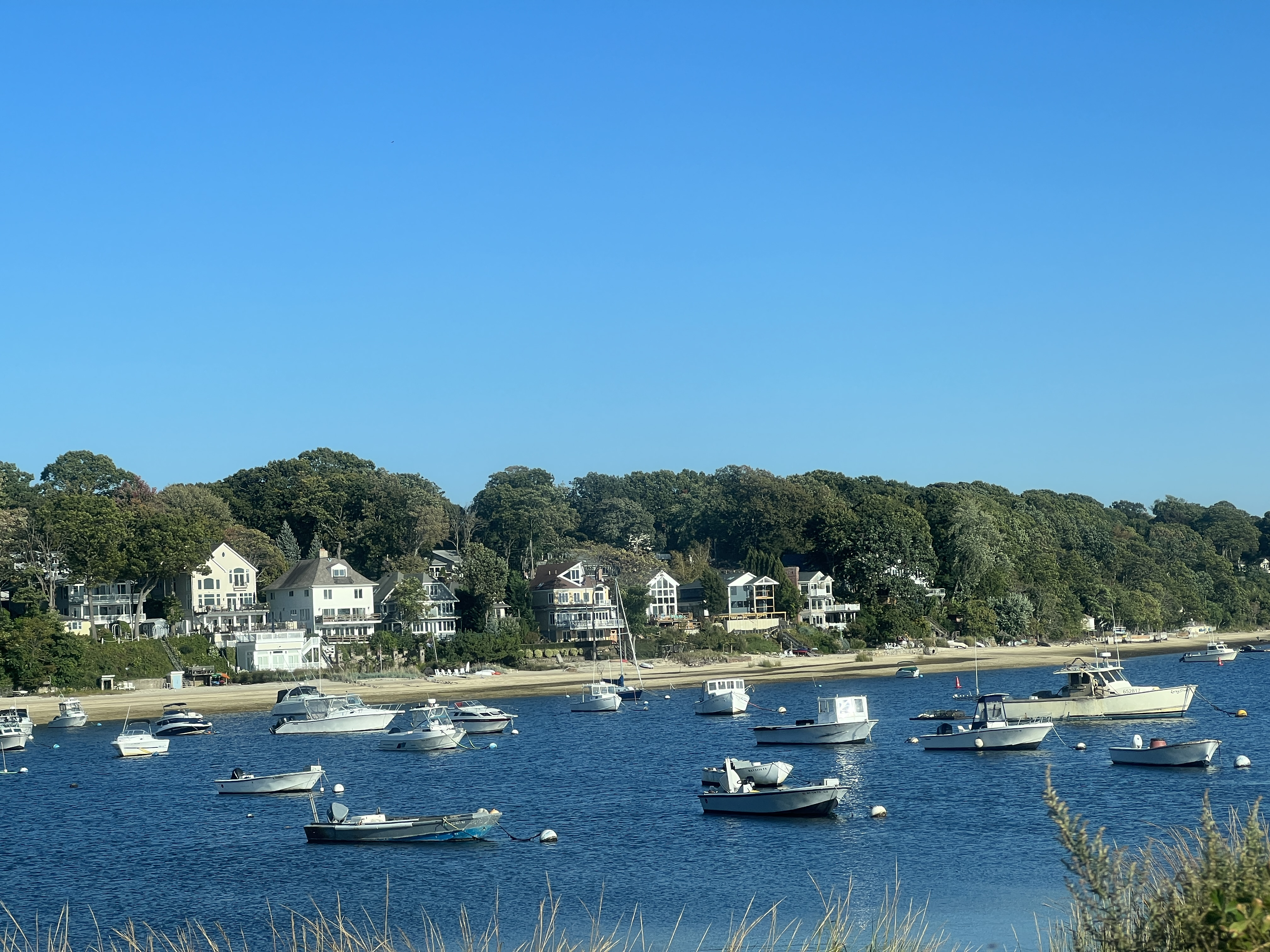
- The waterfront in Eatons Neck on October 9, 2022.

- Location on Long Island and within the state of New York Eatons Island, New York (New York) Eatons Island, New York (the United States)
- Coordinates: 40°56′3″N 73°23′43″W
- Country: United States
- State: New York
- County: Suffolk
- Town: Huntington

Area
  - Total: 3.84 sq mi (9.94 km^{2})
  - Land: 1.00 sq mi (2.60 km^{2})
  - Water: 2.83 sq mi (7.34 km^{2})
- Elevation: 16 ft (5 m)

Population (2020)
  - Total: 1,334
  - Density: 1,327.8/sq mi (512.65/km^{2})
- Time zone: UTC-5 (Eastern (EST))
  - Summer (DST): UTC-4 (EDT)
- ZIP code: 11768
- Area codes: 631, 934
- FIPS code: 36-23316
- GNIS feature ID: 1867404

Eatons Neck is a hamlet and census-designated place (CDP) in the Town of Huntington in Suffolk County, on the North Shore of Long Island, in New York, United States. As of the 2020 census, Eatons Neck had a population of 1,334.

== History ==
In 1927, the bulk of Eatons Neck consisting of what is today known as the Morgan Estate and Two-Acre Zone was subdivided and sold by the heirs of Cornelius H. DeLamater. The Eaton Harbors Corporation was created to hold title to, and maintain, all the private beaches and roads on the former estate.

== Geography ==
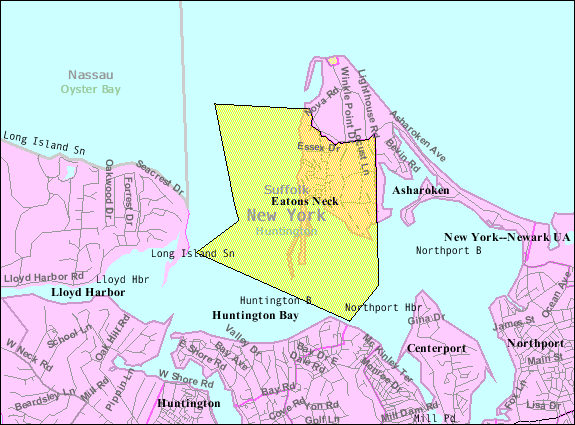
U.S. Census map of Eatons Neck.

According to the United States Census Bureau, the CDP has a total area of 1.0 square mile (2.6 km^{2}), all land.

== Demographics ==
Historical population
Census	Pop.	Note	%±
2020	1,334		—
U.S. Decennial Census

As of the census of 2000, there were 1,388 people, 512 households, and 419 families residing in the CDP. The population density was 1,378.4 inhabitants per square mile (532.2/km^{2}). There were 554 housing units at an average density of 550.2 per square mile (212.4/km^{2}). The racial makeup of the CDP was 98.13% White, 0.22% African American, 1.01% Asian, 0.29% from other races, and 0.36% from two or more races. Hispanic or Latino of any race were 1.15% of the population.

There were 512 households, out of which 33.2% had children under the age of 18 living with them, 74.6% were married couples living together, 5.5% had a female householder with no husband present, and 18.0% were non-families. 14.6% of all households were made up of individuals, and 5.9% had someone living alone who was 65 years of age or older. The average household size was 2.71 and the average family size was 3.01.

In the CDP, the population was spread out, with 24.1% under the age of 18, 3.2% from 18 to 24, 27.2% from 25 to 44, 30.8% from 45 to 64, and 14.7% who were 65 years of age or older. The median age was 42 years. For every 100 females, there were 96.0 males. For every 100 females age 18 and over, there were 96.5 males.

The median income for a household in the CDP was $100,663, and the median income for a family was $104,111. Males had a median income of $94,349 versus $67,083 for females. The per capita income for the CDP was $44,342. About 1.9% of families and 2.3% of the population were below the poverty line, including 2.0% of those under age 18 and 6.9% of those age 65 or over.

As of the census of 2010, there were 1,406 people, 519 households, and 412 families residing in the CDP. The population density was 1,406.0 per square mile. There were 575 housing units at an average density of 575.0/sq mi. The racial makeup of the CDP was 97.4% White, 0.2% African American, 0.9% Asian, 0.1% from other races, and 1.3% from two or more races. Hispanic or Latino of any race were 2.6% of the population.

There were 519 households, out of which 34.5% had children under the age of 18 living with them, 70.9% were married couples living together, 5.4% had a female householder with no husband present, and 20.6% were non-families. 17.0% of all households were made up of individuals, and 7.9% had someone living alone who was 65 years of age or older. The average household size was 2.71 and the average family size was 3.07.

== Education ==
Historically, Eatons Neck had its own school district, which consisted of a single schoolhouse for all grades. However, in 1922, the school district consolidated with the neighboring towns.

As a result Eatons Neck is located entirely within the boundaries of (and is thus served by) the Northport-East Northport Union Free School District. As such, all children who reside within the hamlet and attend public schools go to Northport-East Northport's schools.

== Fire Department ==
Eatons neck is served by the Eatons Neck Fire Department.

== See also ==
- Coast Guard Station Eatons Neck
- Harry E. Donnell
- Cornelius H. DeLamater
- Harry E. Donnell House
- Eaton Harbors Corporation
