= List of New York State Historic Markers in Suffolk County, New York =

This is an incomplete list of New York State Historic Markers in Suffolk County, New York. There are approximately 110 historic markers in the county.

== Listings county-wide ==
=== Babylon ===
	Marker name	Image	Date designated	Location	City or Town	Marker text
1	SOUTH SIDE R.R.		2017	Ketcham Avenue, north of Oak Street	Amityville, New York	Railroad from NYC completed October 1867. First depot erected 1868 for travelers, local commerce and mail. LIRR assumed line by 1876. William G. Pomeroy Foundation, 2017
2	St. Mary's Church		2020	175 Broadway	Amityville, New York	ST. MARY'S CHURCH CONGREGATION EST. 1886 CHAPEL BUILT 1888 BY WESLEY KETCHAM UNDER REV. JAMES H. NOBLE. CONSECRATED BY BISHOP A.N. LITTLEJOHN IN 1889. William G. Pomeroy Foundation, 2020
3	BABYLON TOWN HALL		1986	47 West Main Street	Village of Babylon, New York	Built 1917–1918. Seat of Town Government until 1957. Served as Town and District Court House from 1918 to 1979. Erected in 1986
4	SUFFOLK COUNTY		1975	Peterkin Park, Oak Street	Amityville, New York	Organized November 1, 1683. One of the original counties of the Province of New York. Originally East Riding of Yorkshire. Suffolk County A.R.B.C. 1975
5	SOUTH SIDE R.R.		2017	Railroad Avenue and Depot Place	Village of Babylon, New York	First train arrived from Jamaica October 11, 1867. Rail brought NYC visitors spurring resort era boom. LIRR assumed line by 1876. William G. Pomeroy Foundation, 2017
6	SOUTH SIDE R.R.		2017	Great Neck Road at Railroad Avenue	Copiague, New York	
7	SOUTH SIDE R.R.		2017	Wellwood Avenue at Hoffman Avenue	Lindenhurst, New York	Railroad established 1867. Originally Wellwood Station. Renamed Breslau 1870. Adopted Lindenhurst by 1891. LIRR assumed line by 1876. William G. Pomeroy Foundation, 2017
8	BELMONT JUNCTION		2017	Railroad Avenue (Trolley Line Road) at Great East Neck Road	West Babylon, New York	Connected Central Railroad with LIRR Ca. 1874. Freight & Telegraph Site Until 1888. Located Near Belmont Stud Farm. Trolley Stop 1910-20. William G. Pomeroy Foundation, 2017

=== Brookhaven ===
	Marker name	Image	Date designated	Location	City or Town	Marker text
1	Hook & Ladder 1		2017	Hawkins Avenue	Lake Ronkonkoma, New York	Hook & Ladder 1. Devastating Hotel Fire in 1903 Led to Organization of Fire Department By Village in 1904. Incorporated With NY State in 1906. Lake Ronkonkoma Heritage Association / Purchased with a grant from William G. Pomeroy Foundation
2	1884 CHURCH SITE		2017	Church Street, across from Lake Promenade	Lake Ronkonkoma, New York	1884 CHURCH SITE First St. Joseph's Roman Catholic Church Built in Only 1-1/2 Months. Dedicated By Bishop John Loughlin On June 22, 1884. Lake Ronkonkoma Heritage Association / Purchased with a grant from William G. Pomeroy Foundation
3	LILLIAN DEVERE		2017	Church Street	Lake Ronkonkoma, New York	LILLIAN DEVERE 1875-1955 FOUNDING MEMBER OF LAKE RONKONKOMA EQUAL RIGHTS SUFFRAGE CLUB 1912. MOBILIZED LOCAL WOMEN TO OBTAIN THE VOTE. Lake Ronkonkoma Heritage Association / Purchased with a grant from WILLIAM G. POMEROY FOUNDATION
4	EPISCOPAL CHURCH		2017	315 Lake Shore Road	Lake Ronkonkoma, New York	EPISCOPAL CHURCH. ST. MARY’S CHURCH FOUNDED. CA. 1867. BUILDING GIFT OF COLONEL & MRS. J.H. PULESTON, MEMBER OF BRITISH PARLIAMENT. CHURCH REBUILT IN 1971. Lake Ronkonkoma Heritage Association / Purchased with a Grant from William G. Pomeroy Foundation
5	INDIAN PRINCESS		2016	Lake Shore Road, north of Portion Road and Shorehaven Boulevard	Lake Ronkonkoma, New York	INDIAN PRINCESS OF LAKE RONKONKOMA. LEGEND SAYS SHE CLAIMS ONE MALE EACH YEAR BY DROWNING TO BE WITH HER AT BOTTOM OF LAKE AS SHE SEEKS HER TRUE LOVE. Lake Ronkonkoma Heritage Association / NEW YORK FOLKLORE SOCIETY/ Purchased with a Grant from William G. Pomeroy Foundation
6	ARROWHEADS		2017	Cherry Street	Lake Ronkonkoma, New York	ARROWHEADS. E. Basford Hawkins And Ivar Okvist Collected Over 5000 Arrowheads & Artifacts In Lake Ronk. 1893-1988. Rest Well Gentlemen. Lake Ronkonkoma Heritage Association
7	1853 SITE OF		2017	Hawkins Avenue	Lake Ronkonkoma, New York	1853 SITE OF Methodist Episcopal CHurch. Dedicated April 1853. Incorporated 1859. Congregation Established In 1780 Home of Caleb Newton. Lake Ronkonkoma Heritage Association
1	BALD HILL		2013	Farmingville Hills Park	Farmingville, New York	One-Room Greek Revival style schoolhouse built in 1850. This school served the Farmingville community continuously until 1929. William C. Pomeroy Foundation
2	HISTORIC FLIGHT			Artist Lake, NY 25	Middle Island, New York	Ralph Johnstone landed near here on October 27, 1910, after wind forced his plane backwards from Belmont Park Altitude record of 8471 ft. Town of Brookhaven
3	MORICHES INN		2013	81 Main Street	Center Moriches, New York	AKA Terry-Ketcham Inn. In 1791 Thomas Jefferson & James Madison lodged here while on a trip to visit General Wm. Floyd of Mastic. William C. Pomeroy Foundation
3	HART'S TAVERN		1999	261 Montauk Highway	Patchogue, New York	In 1790 George Washington lodged here while on a trip to tour Long Island. The Greater Patchogue Historical Society 1999
4	NEAR THIS SITE		2013	New York State Route 25A across from Patchogue Drive	Rocky Point, New York	Freed African-Americans owned and developed land by 1790. Davis, Jessup, Lyman, Sells, Phillips, Prince, and Miller families among early settlers. William G. Pomeroy Foundation
5	POOSPATUCK RES.		2015	Montauk Highway	Mastic, New York	Unkechaug Indian Nation recognized by State of New York 1777. Located 1 mile south at Forge River and Poospatuck Creek; William G. Pomeroy Foundation
6	ROE TAVERN		1936	New York State Route 25A	East Setauket, New York	Stood here 1703–1936. Washington spent the night here April 22, 1790. Austin Roe, Inn Keeper, was one of Washington's spies. State Education Department
7	CIRCA 1740			Montauk Highway	South Haven, New York	South Haven Church Cemetery (Presbyterian). Burial Ground of early settlers of Brookhaven and their descendants. Church moved to Brookhaven Hamlet 1961. New York Commission of the Bicentennial U. S. Constitution

=== East Hampton ===
	Marker name	Image	Date designated	Location	City or Town	Marker text
1	East Hampton Town		1975	732 E Hampton Sag Harbor turnpike, New York State Route 114	Village of East Hampton, New York	Founded 1648, Dongan Patent 1686; State Education Dept. 1937
2	Clinton Academy		1975	151 Main Street	Village of East Hampton, New York	Founded 1784 by Rev. Dr. Buell. William Payne was first teacher. It was the first Academy Chartered by State Board of Regents. Suffolk County A.R.B.C. 1975
3	May Groot Manson - Suffragette		2017	117 Main St, East Hampton, NY 11937 New York State Route 27	Village of East Hampton, New York	Inscription. MAY GROOT MANSON 1859-1917. HOME OF LEADER OF WOMAN SUFFRAGE LEAGUE OF EAST HAMPTON & WOMEN'S POLITICAL UNION; William G. Pomeroy Foundation. 2017
4	Site of Home; REV. THOMAS PAYNE		1975	38 James Lane, opposite South Hill Cemetery	Village of East Hampton, New York	Lived here 1650-96. Prepared a Catechism for Montauk Indians. Was arrested for asserting rights. Suffolk County A.R.B.C. 1975
5	First Sheep Fold		1950	3 Egypt Lane, Pantigo	Town of East Hampton, New York	First Sheep Fold pasture. c.1684. “very swampy, wet area” that was the first sheep pasture in East Hampton’s history, next to The Hiram Sanford House, restored house of the man who ran the Pantigo Windmill; State Education Department 1950
6	Spider Legged Mill		1950	400 Sagg Main Street, Sagaponack, NY 11962	Town of East Hampton, New York	Inscription: Site of the Spider Legged Mill to which Major Cochrane tied William Russell to a post during the Revolution and ordered him whipped until bloodied State Education Department 1950
7	Poxabogue Mill		1950	54 Sagg Main Street, Sagaponack, NY 11962	Town of East Hampton, New York	Inscription: Site of a spider legged mill. Subject of a famous lawsuit which decided the rights of landowners to adjacent highway New York State law 1842; State Education Department 1950
8	Town Church		1935	158 Main St, East Hampton, NY 11937	Village of East Hampton, New York	Inscription: Largest and most costly on Long Island. Used 1717-1861. Here were ordained Samuel Buel, Samson Occom, Lyman Beecher and Stephen Mershon; State Education Department 1935
9	Town Church site		1975	39 James Lane, South Hill Cemetery	Village of East Hampton, New York	Site of the first town church. Built by town 1651. Used until 1717. A frame building 20x26 with a thached roof, stood on or very near this spot ARBC 1975
10	First Custom House		1936	3 Main St, Sag Harbor, NY 11963	Town of East Hampton, New York	First Custom House in the First District of New York State - Act passed by Congress making Sag Harbor Port of Entry, approved Aug.4,1790; State Education Department 1936

=== Huntington ===
	Marker name	Image	Date designated	Location	City or Town	Marker text
1	Arthur Dove (1880–1946); Helen Torr (1886–1967)		2016	30 Centershore Road	Centerport, New York	Early Abstract Artists Lived and Painted Here Beginning in 1938; Heckscher Museum
2	Bethel A.M.E. Church		1986	291 Park Avenue	Huntington, New York	Incorporated in 1843, Moved in 1845 to the building called "The Seminary" standing here at that time Historian's Office, 1986
3	Brindley Field		1974	Northeast corner of Larkfield Road and Jericho Turnpike	Commack, New York	World War 1, U.S. Army Signal Corps, aviation section, flying training field, June 1918 – May 1919; Town of Huntington
4	Camp Alvernia		2003	On Prospect Road	Centerport, New York	Established 1888, First Catholic Summer Camp in the Country. Legendary Coach Vince Lombardi Practiced Football Here with St. Francis Prep 1932 & 33. - Franciscan Brothers; Town of Huntington
5	CARLL HOUSE		2002	49 Melville Road @ Eckert Street	South Huntington, New York	This is the only example of early hewn salt box architecture on Long Island. Built around 1740. Town of Huntington
6	Clay Pitts Road		1999		East Northport, New York	Road also called \"Water St.\" for river which once ran here. Later called \"Avery Road\" for early local farmer. East Northport Chamber of Commerce
7	COLD SPRING HARBOR; FIRE DEPARTMENT		1993	Main Street at Elm Place	Cold Spring Harbor, New York	Founded 1852. Fire House Built 1930 & 1970. Town of Huntington
8	Constitution Oak		1988	Old Town Green	Huntington, New York	Dedicated on the 200th anniversary of New York States Ratification of the U.S. Constitution. Town of Huntington
9	CROSS ISLAND TROLLEY; 1898-1927		1990	Halesite Fire Department on NY 110	Halesite, New York	North Terminus of the Trolley from Halesite to Amityville. Town of Huntington
10	EATON'S NECK		1964	Eatons Neck Road, west of Ocean Avenue	Northport, New York	Home of John Sloss Hobart. Revolutionary War Patriot, U.S. Senator & Judge. He mortgaged all but honor to found this nation. Northport High School
11	FIRE DEPARTMENT		1993	237 Main Street	Huntington, New York	This building housed the first motorized fire engines on L.I. and was the site of the Huntington Fire Department from 1911 to 1958. Town of Huntington
12	FIVE GATES		2003	627 Half Hollow Hills Road	Half Hollow Hills, New York	Built by John Rogers in 1732. Oldest House in Dix Hills. Name refers to number of gates to grazing areas. Nat'l Reg. Historic Places; Town of Huntington
13	GILBERT POTTER		2025	60 Wall Street	Huntington, New York	DOCTOR, MILITIA LEADER & REVOLUTIONARY WAR PATRIOT LIVED HERE. "I AM DETERMINED TO LIVE AND DIE FREE." DECEMBER 10, 1775. Town of Huntington
13	Huntington's Earliest; CHURCH		1965	SW corner of New York State Route 25A and Spring Street	Huntington, New York	Stood on this corner 1665 to 1715 when it was sold for 5 lbs. and 2 shillings. Town of Huntington
14	IN MEMORIAM			Northeast corner of Larkfield Road and Jericho Turnpike	Commack, New York	On August 16, 1918, an aircraft accident at this site claimed the lives of 2nd lts. C.S. Gideon & Harold Maxson stationed at Brindley Field. The Town Historian
15	INTERNATIONAL BOUNDARY		1976	Woodbury Road and Southwest Corner of Harbor Road	Cold Spring Harbor, New York	Of New Netherland and the New England Confederation by the Treaty of Hartford 1650-1664. Bicentennial Committee
16	INTERNATIONAL BOUNDARY		2004	Manetto Hill Road east of Plainview Road	West Hills, New York	Of New Netherland and the New England Confederation by the Treaty of Hartford 1650-1664. Town of Huntington
17	J. GARDINER FARM		2006	900 Park Avenue	Greenlawn, New York	House Built 1750. Enlarged 1860. Site of gruesome murder in 1842. Bequeathed to H. Gardiner in 2003 to the Greenlawn - Centerport Historical Association; Town of Huntington
18	ISRAEL KETCHUM		1985	Harbor Road, west of Shore Road	Cold Spring Harbor, New York	Of Cold Spring Harbor while jailed for counterfeiting revealed a plot to assassinate George Washington in June 1776. Town of Huntington, Erected 1985
19	JOSEPH LLOYD MANOR		1976	Lloyd Harbor Road and Lloyds Lane	Lloyd Harbor, New York	Interior by Connecticut Housewrights in 1766–67 for Joseph Lloyd 1716–1780, Patriot, Son of Henry Lloyd 1st Lord of the Manor; Town of Huntington Bicentennial Commission
20	L. I. MOTOR PARKWAY		1973	Half Hollow Hills Community Library	Half Hollow Hills, New York	First concrete limited-access highway built by W.K. Vanderbilt; A. Pardington, Engineer 1908–1910; Town of Huntington
21	L. I. MOTOR PARKWAY		2004	Lloyd Harbor Road and Lloyds Lane	Melville, New York	Remains of last parkway bridge in Suffolk Co., 125' east constructed 1910 for passage over 1st limited access highway preserved in 2004; Town of Huntington / Oxford Management Services
22	LLOYD MANOR		1993	Lloyd Harbor Road	Lloyd Harbor, New York	Built by Henry Lloyd in 1711. Birthplace of Jupiter Hammon, America's First Black Poet, October 17, 1711-Ca. 1790; Town of Huntington
23	MASONIC LODGE			342 New York Avenue	Huntington, New York	Chartered on January 25, 1860. Land purchased 1869 for $1000. Cornerstone laid August 25, 1904. First meeting at this location held March 27, 1905; Jephtha Lodge No. 494 F.&A.M.
24	NORTHPORT RAILROAD STATION		2000	Parking Lot 33 between entrance and exit to Bellerose Avenue	East Northport, New York	Original station was 1½ miles northwest which remained open from 1867–1899. This station opened 1873-Also called Northport. In Memory of Frank C. Becher.; East Northport Chamber of Commerce.
25	OLD COUNTRY ROAD		2000		Melville, New York	Samuel Ketcham's hollow southern boundary of the first purchase from the Maitencock Indians in 1653; New York State Bicentennial Commission, 1976 and the Town of Huntington.
26	SILAS WOOD		1936		Huntington, New York	1769–1847, Author of first history of Long Island, his home stood on this site until 1881. New York State Educational Department, 1936 and the Town of Huntington.
27	Site Of CENTERPORT (UPPER) MILL		1977	Northeast corner of Mill Dam Road and Centershore Road	Centerport, New York	Built by Sylvanus Townsend in 1774, replaced an earlier mill build further south in 1674. New York State Bicentennial Commission, 1977 and the Town of Huntington.
28	SITE OF ST. JOHN'S EPISCOPAL CHURCH AND BURIAL GROUND		1989	At Bethel AME Church and Manse	Huntington, New York	Built 1747. Samuel Seabury, Jr., Catechist, 1784 & Later. First American Bishop, 1784. Town of Huntington.
29	SKIDMORE HOUSE		1977		Northport, New York	Oldest House in Village of Northport. Built by Bryant Skidmore in 1761 near Great Cow Harbor and Red Hook. New York State Bicentennial Commission, 1977 and the Town of Huntington.
30	SUFFOLK COUNTY		1937	NY 25A, east of Nassau-Suffolk County Line	Cold Spring Harbor, New York	Organized Nov. 1, 1683. One of Original counties of New York. Originally East Riding of Yorkshire. New York State Education Department, 1937.

=== Islip ===
	Marker name	Image	Date designated	Location	City or Town	Marker text
1	1859 Dame House			Third Avenue and Fourth Street	Brentwood	Modern Times Octagon Home. Designed for economy of space by William Upham Dame. Residence 1st Floor & M.T. Assembly Hall on 2nd Floor; Historic Landmark Preservation Committee
2	Brentwood, New York		2013	1769 Brentwood Rd, Brentwood, NY 11717	Brentwood, New York	Modern Times octagon home designed for economy of space by William Upham Dame. Residence 1st fl. & M.T. assembly hall on 2nd fl.. Historical Landmark Preservation Committee
3	Gibb Patent			Main Street at Islip Town Hall	Islip	Islip Hamlet Land Grant by British Rulers William and Mary to Andrew Gibb in 1692. Associate of William Nichol and Leisler Rebellion Foe. Historical Society of Islip Hamlet
4	ISLIP DEPOT			Islip Avenue at Parking Field 9	Islip	South Side Railroad 1867–1876. LIRR acquired 1880. 2nd Track 1908. Station house south side 1868–1950. North 1959. Restored 1997. Historical Society of Islip Hamlet
5	L.I. MOTOR PARKWAY; 1908-1938		2017	Lakeland Fire Department on Long Island Motor Parkway	Ronkonkoma	Early Road Built Exclusively for Automobiles Eastern Terminus Completed in 1911 to Ronkonkoma Lake; Lake Ronkonkoma Heritage Association / Purchased with a grant from William G. Pomeroy Foundation
6	Old '88			Sayville Public Library, Greene Avenue at Swayze Street	Sayville	1888–1969. Educated the community for Eighty-One Years. Designed by Issac H. Green, Jr. Sayville Historic Society
7	The Green House			93 Montauk Highway	West Sayville	George Washington stopped at this historic home during his historic tour of Long Island on April 21, 1790. Sayville Historic Society

=== Southold ===
	Marker name	Image	Date designated	Location	City or Town	Marker text
1	First Submarine Base			Main Street at Cutchogue Harbor; Holland Torpedo Boat Station	New Suffolk	This marks the site of the first submarine base in this country where "U.S.S. Holland" first submarine commissioned by U.S. Navy was based for trials. In the period between 1899 and 1905 six other submarines of the Holland Torpedo Boat Co. were based at this site which was known as the Holland Torpedo Boat Station. Naval maneuvers between submarines and the U.S.S. Torpedo Boat Destroyer "Winslow" of Spanish War fame were held in these waters. Cutchogue - New Suffolk Historical Society
2	Truman's Beach			East Marion-Orient Causeway	East Marion	Called "Hard Beach" by the first settlers. During the War of 1812 Commodore Decatur with three ships "United States," "Macedonia" and "Hornet" lay at anchor off this sand spit. Eight times in two centuries, storms tore through here and cut Oysterponds off from the mainland. Oysterponds Historical Society

=== Smithtown ===
	Marker name	Image	Date designated	Location	City or Town	Marker text
1	BATTLE OF FORT SLONGO			Fort Salonga Road east of Bread and Cheese Hollow Road	Fort Salonga	Took place near this site on Oct. 3, 1781. American forced defeated British forces holding Fort Slongo; Donated by Fort Salonga Association
2	HOME OF OBADIAH SMITH			853 Saint Johnland Road	San Remo	Circa 1700 - Grandson of the Patentee Richard Smythe
3	NISSEQUOGUE SCHOOL			631 Moriches Road (now the Village Hall)	Saint James	Built 1808 - Subscribers; James Smith. Ebenezer Smith. Thomas Smith. Richard Smith. Peter Jayne. Woodhull Smith. Micah Smith. Nicholas Smith.

== See also ==
- List of New York State Historic Markers
- National Register of Historic Places listings in New York
- List of National Historic Landmarks in New York
