= Samuel Ballton =

Escaped enslaved person, Civil War veteran, farmer, and entrepreneur

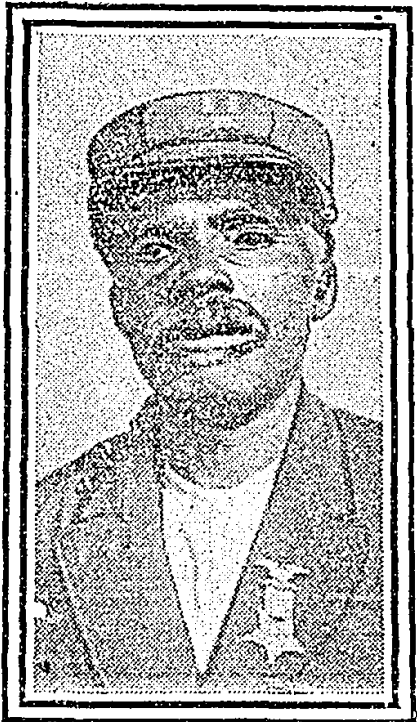
- Born: January 1, 1838; Westmoreland County, Virginia
- Died: April 30, 1917 (aged 79); Greenlawn, New York
- Burial place: Huntington Rural Cemetery
- Spouse: Rebecca Richardson (m. 1861)
- Children: 13 (7 survived)

Samuel Ballton (January 1, 1838 - April 30, 1917) was an escaped enslaved person-turned farmer and entrepreneur, known as "The Pickle King" of Greenlawn, New York. Born enslaved in Westmoreland, Virginia, Ballton moved to Greenlawn in 1873 after escaping slavery and serving in the Union Army during the Civil War.

== Early life ==
Samuel Ballton was one of nine children. He only seven years old when he was put to work. Before coming of age, Ballton had fallen in love with a girl from a neighboring farm, Rebecca Richardson, and married her on April 15, 1861. Following the breakout of the Civil War, able-bodied slaves were sent to work on the Virginia Central Railroad; Ballton was sent to the Blue Ridge Mountains. It was there that he formed a plan to escape during a holiday transfer to Fredericks Hall station. After reaching the Yankees four miles from Spotsylvania, he secured a position as a cook with the Sixth Wisconsin Regiment at Fredericksburg. He later returned to help his wife, her mother, and another pair of slaves escape from slavery. In 1864, Ballton went to Boston, Massachusetts, where he enlisted in the Fifth Massachusetts Cavalry and was honorably discharged on November 30, 1865.

== Postwar ==
In 1873, Ballton came to Greenlawn, Long Island, to work for Charles D. Smith. Three years later, he joined the Greenlawn Presbyterian Church and was also a member of William Lloyd Garrison Post, G.A.R. Ballton made a name for himself raising large quantities of cucumbers, even raising one-and-a-half million pickles in one season. The first reference to the "Pickle King" title was in the Brooklyn Daily Eagle in 1900. Ballton, whose last name was spelled wrong as Bolton, had a farmer from the neighboring town of Commack arrested on the basis of attempted voter suppression.

Deciding to experiment with other commercial ventures in the summer of 1903, Ballton ran a stagecoach between Centerport and Greenlawn station alongside a livery business connected by telephone. The stage route was discontinued that same fall on September 11. The following year, on May 24, the misfortune continued when Ballton lost his Civil War discharge papers in a house fire.

Despite the loss, Ballton continued his entrepreneurial pursuits by expanding into real estate. In Greenlawn, Ballton began by advertising a modern home on four acres in 1906 with a bold title. After getting familiar with his local town, Ballton expanded into Centerport with a new house with a store on five-and-a-half acres. Pivoting strategies, he compared the costs of renting and purchasing a new cottage with a persuasively written listing. A larger six-room home was listed shortly afterwards. This was quickly followed by another large property between Northport and Centerport. Lastly, a six-month rental with an option to purchase in Centerport.

Ballton did not hesitate to voice his views on important matters locally and politically. In 1900, writing to a Brooklyn Daily Times correspondent, Ballton expressed his disdain over the attempted voter suppression of a fellow Black man. Then on two separate occasions, Ballton wrote to the editor of The Long-Islander. First was before the 1912 election, exclaiming his distaste with the Progressives or "Third Party," comparing them to "deserters." Then, after living in Greenlawn for forty-one years, Ballton gave his history of the town, praising the locality and business developments, but was displeased with the stagnant real estate development, which fueled his desire to improve any land he purchased, concluding by scolding residents for the town's unexplored potential.

== Legacy ==
On June 18, 2016, Samuel Ballton was memorialized through two historic markers commissioned by the Town of Huntington. One was placed between Broadway and Gaines Avenue, and the other at the intersection of Taylor and Boulevard Avenues, noting the houses built near each location. Then, in March 2020, the Huntington Town Board renamed a portion of Boulevard Avenue in Greenlawn to honor Ballton. A street sign unveiling occurred the following year on June 16, around Juneteenth. In 2022, Representative Thomas R. Suozzi proposed a bill to Congress to "designate the facility of the United States Postal Service located at 55 Broadway in Greenlawn, New York, as the 'Samuel Ballton Post Office.'" In 2024, the Harborfields High School Jazz Band collaborated with the Greenlawn-Centerport Historical Association to learn about Ballton's life and commissioned an original jazz piece titled "The Pickle King."

Other memorials include the community park behind the Harborfields Public Library being renamed "Pickle Park," and the annual pickle festival by the Greenlawn-Centerport Historical Association.
