= JB Baretsky =

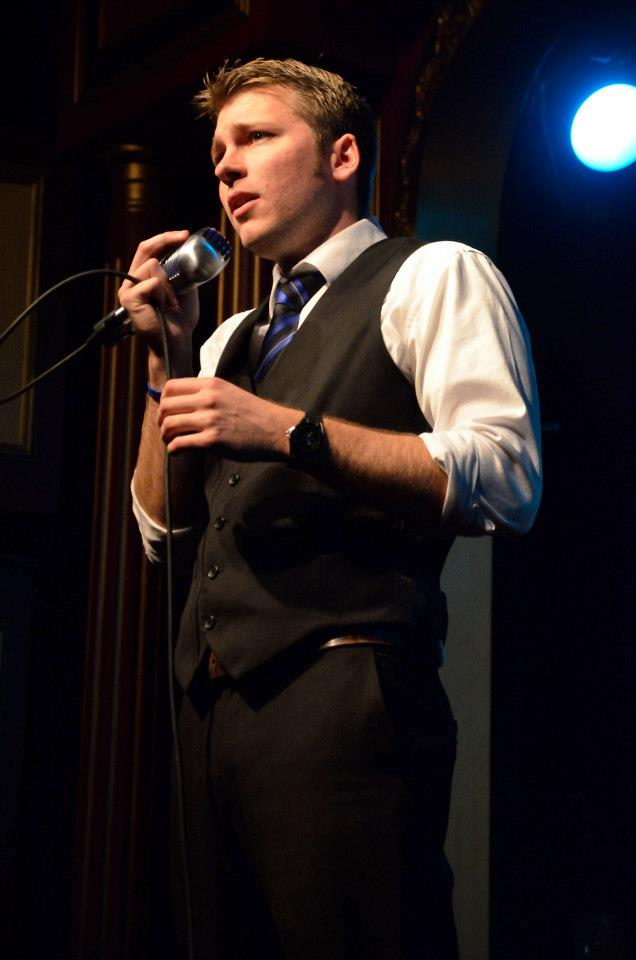
- Baretsky performing to a sold out crowd in New York.

Background information
- Born: June 9, 1987 (age 39)
- Origin: Long Island, New York, United States
- Genres: Jazz, pop
- Occupations: Musician, songwriter
- Instruments: Vocals, piano, harmonica
- Years active: 2010–present
- Website: jbbaretsky.com

JB Baretsky (born June 9, 1987) is an American singer-songwriter from Long Island, New York. He records and performs classic standards from the Great American Songbook, covers of contemporary music, and original material.

== Early year ==
Baretsky grew up in a suburb, outside of New York City. He decided to take his singing career seriously when his uncle died of Lou Gehrig's disease. He started recording demos in his friend's bedroom, singing over karaoke instrumentals of old standards. He would sing at local dive bars in a suit that was too big for him, singing with a glass of iced tea in his hand, pretending to be tipsy, but telling the audience he was drinking Jack Daniel's; a joke he still uses.

Baretsky developed his first trio in 2010, with fellow students, while studying at St. Joseph's College. They would go on to win several school competitions and develop a local following. After graduation, Baretsky performed throughout the New York area, honing his stage experience. Early gigs included restaurants, wine vineyards, and street fairs.

== Career ==
He was discovered in June 2010 by manager Raj Tawney when Baretsky sent him a demo recording of "Moondance" that sparked his interest. Tawney signed him to his New Logic Mgmt, where he began developing Baretsky's career. In the six months following, Tawneyfrequently took Baretsky to a local recording studio where they recorded dozens of demos.

In 2011, Baretsky began full studio sessions with original instrumentation and musician accompaniment with producer, Matthew Einsidler. There are 24 studio recordings available for streaming on his YouTube channel, consisting of covers and original songs.

He was invited to perform at the Lincoln Center for the Performing Arts at the 35th AAC Festival on June 11 and 19, 2011.

Baretsky begin receiving numerous write-ups and interviews with major publications. On September 9, 2011, he was featured in an article in JazzTimes about leading the jazz vocalist genre. He was twice featured in Pulse Magazine for his Lincoln Center performance and then a two-page feature in their May 2012 issue. In the March 2012 issue of Village Connection Magazine, he was featured in a full two-page spread.

He had a successful residency at Huntington Social, in Huntington, New York, from December 2011 to April 2012. A photo shoot for Baretsky was produced inside of the venue in February 2012. On February 3, 2012, Baretsky performed the standard; ""That's Life"" in a live video segment for Jon Chattman's A-Sides Music and The Huffington Post, alongside UK band Twin Atlantic.

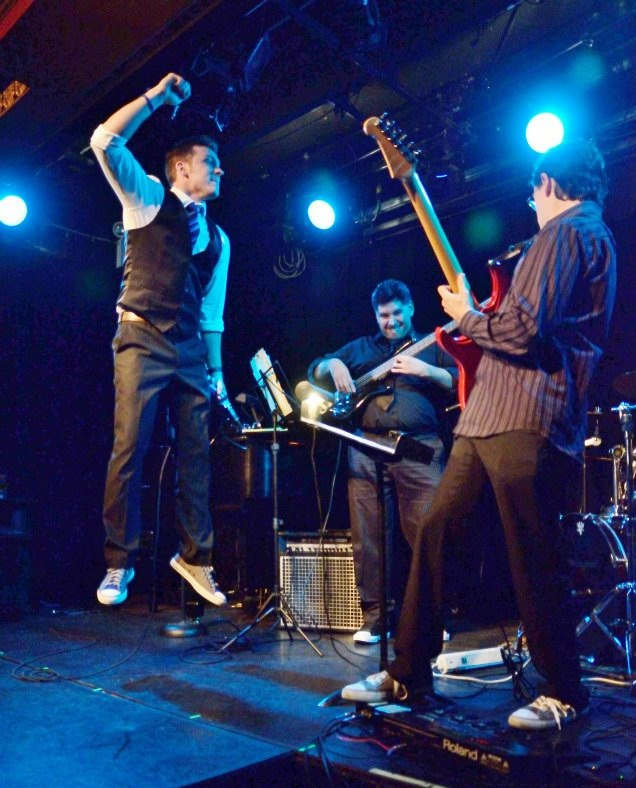
JB and Trio (11/2/12)

On July 30, 2012, his alma mater St. Joseph's College featured Baretsky in their "Alumni Spotlight" as an outstanding alumnus.

Baretsky sold out his first headlining show at Somethin' Jazz Club in New York City on August 11, 2012.

Baretsky performed at the 2012 Oyster Bay Festival.

Baretsky performed at the Triad Theater on November 2, 2012, in New York City. The show was dedicated to the victims of Hurricane Sandy, as it was only four days after the disaster.

He is recording his debut album, Less Is More, which was projected for a 2013 release. The album will consist of original recordings, including his song "One Nighter." It is undetermined if any covers will appear on the track-listing.

On May 23, 2013, The Long Islander newspaper wrote a feature on Baretsky, detailing his career and promoting his performance with non-for-profit organization, SparkBoom, on May 31, 2013.

On September 28, 2013, St. Joseph's College, Baretsky's alma mater, dedicated a themed event featuring Baretsky and trio. The event, titled "Java, Jazz, and JB Baretsky" was highlighted in Newsday and FIOS 1.

In 2015 Baretsky moved to Las Vegas, Nevada. He spent all of 2015 performing stand-up comedy on various stages in Las Vegas including Planet Hollywood hotel and casino.

In January 2016 Baretsky debuted as a cast member in Tony and Tinas Wedding at Ballys hotel and Casino.

== Band members ==
- JB Baretsky – lead vocals, piano, keyboard, harmonica
- Chris Amelar – lead guitar
- Miguel Flores – drums, percussion
- Robert Cruz – bass
