= Franciscan Brothers of Brooklyn =

The Franciscan Brothers of Brooklyn, formally known as the Congregation of the Religious Brothers of the Third Order Regular of St. Francis, were founded in Brooklyn, New York, in 1858. They have been actively involved in the education of boys and young men, primarily on Long Island, New York, serving the Diocese of Brooklyn (and later also the Diocese of Rockville Centre) since their founding. The Brothers of the congregation use the postnominal initials of O.S.F. Numbering 80 members as of 2008, they are the largest congregation of Religious Brothers founded in America. Formerly a diocesan congregation, in 1989, they became an Institute of Pontifical Right.

== History ==
=== Irish roots ===
Ireland had been the home of 47 monasteries of friars, both priests and lay brothers, of the Franciscan Third Order Regular, which were centers of learning. These communities were suppressed under the Penal Laws put in place in their land under English rule. The Order continued in hiding, with only lay members. Their ministry was that of instructing Catholic boys in the faith in underground "bog schools".

After the ban on education by Catholics was repealed in 1782, two Brothers established themselves as the Franciscan Brothers of Ireland, a congregation of Religious Brothers, and opened a monastery and free primary school for poor boys in Milltown, Dublin. Several foundations soon followed. In 1818 they were given land in Mountbellew, County Galway, to which the monastery moved and opened a primary school, now the Mountbellew Agricultural College.

=== New York ===
In 1847, the Brothers accepted the invitation of the Bishop of Pittsburgh and established a monastery there, the first community of Religious Brothers in the United States. John Loughlin, the first Bishop of Brooklyn, issued a similar invitation to the Brothers to operate schools for the boys of his diocese in 1858. Under the leadership of Brother John McMahon, O.S.F., and Brother Vincent Hayes, O.S.F., a group of six Brothers, sent from the monastery in Roundstone, County Galway, soon arrived and opened St. Francis Monastery on Butler Street and St. Francis Academy (now the site of St. Francis College), the first Catholic school in Brooklyn. The monastery served as the base of operations for the Brothers as they spread out over the City of Brooklyn in their ministry of education.

Over the subsequent decades, the Brothers staffed local parochial schools. In 1882, at the request of Archbishop John Ireland, a group of Brothers left Brooklyn and opened a new monastery in Spalding, Nebraska, whose Brothers operated a school for Native American boys.

The Brothers opened St. Anthony's High School in Smithtown, New York in 1933. They also founded schools as far away as Florida and California and helped to found St. Bonaventure University and were among the first teachers there. They founded Camp Alvernia in Centerport, New York, in 1888, which remains the oldest Catholic summer camp in continuous operation in the country. They now also operate several facilities for spiritual retreats on the grounds, including Mount Alvernia Retreat Center. In the early 1920s, the camp was the site of an anti-Catholic demonstration by the Ku Klux Klan, which conducted a cross burning on its grounds.

==== Division ====
By the beginning of the 20th century, a desire had grown among the Brothers for closer ties to the wider Franciscan Third Order Regular. In addition, some of the Brothers had felt the call to become priests and saw the utility of having priests in the community to serve the spiritual needs of the Brothers and of their students. In 1906 the Brother Superior of the monastery, Brother Raphael Brehenny, O.S.F., and later his successor, Brother Linus Lynch, O.S.F., asked the bishop for permission to have some of the members of that community sent to be prepared for ordination. The bishop refused this request, as the community had been introduced into the diocese for the care of parish schools, and he feared that in the event of its members becoming priests this work would suffer.

The following year some 25 Brothers gave up their religious vows to the Brooklyn monastery and joined the Brothers in Nebraska, whose bishop had approved their incorporation into the friars of the Third Order Regular of St. Francis of Penance headquartered in Rome. This led to the establishment of that Order in the United States in 1910.

==== Pontifical status ====
From the time of their founding, the Brothers had lived as a religious congregation of diocesan right, which put them entirely under the authority of the Bishop of Brooklyn, who served as their Superior General. In 1989 Pope John Paul II issued a Decree of Praise, which established the Franciscan Brothers of Brooklyn as an Institute of Pontifical Right. This removed them from the direct authority of the local bishop and made them subject instead to the Holy See. They were then able to operate outside their home dioceses of Brooklyn and Rockville Centre anywhere in the world.

== Ministry ==
The Franciscan Brothers of Brooklyn are primarily involved in educational and pastoral ministries. At present the Brothers help to staff Catholic high schools in Cape Girardeau, Missouri, and Raleigh, North Carolina.
