= St. Francis Preparatory School =

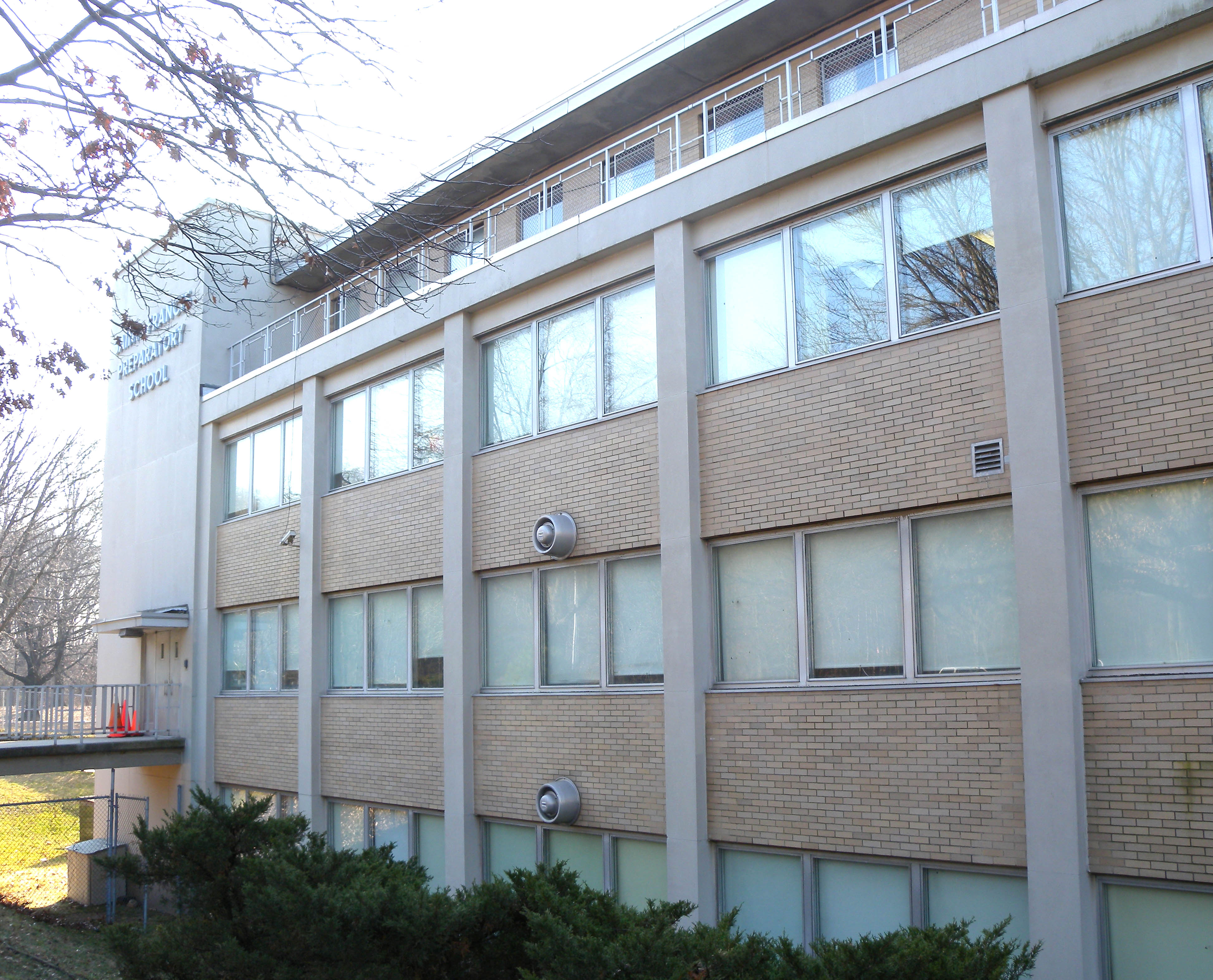

Location
- 6100 Francis Lewis Boulevard; New York City (Fresh Meadows, Queens), New York 11365; United States; 40°44′32″N 73°46′34″W

Information
- Other name: St. Francis Prep
- School type: Private, College-preparatory school
- Motto: Latin: Deus Meus et Omnia (My God and My All)
- Religious affiliation: Roman Catholic
- Patron saint: Saint Francis of Assisi
- Established: 1858; 168 years ago
- Oversight: Franciscan Brothers of Brooklyn
- President: Leonard Conway
- Principal: Patrick McLaughlin
- Chaplain: Fr. Ralph Edel
- Teaching staff: 115.6 (FTE) (2015–16)
- Grades: 9–12
- Gender: Co-ed
- Enrollment: 2,420 (2021–22)
- Average class size: 30
- Student to teacher ratio: 20.9∶1 (2015–16)
- Colors: Red; Blue
- Slogan: “High School is four years; the Prep is forever.”
- Fight song: On For Ol' St Francis
- Mascot: Terrier
- Nickname: Prep
- Team name: Terriers
- Rivals: Monsignor McClancy Memorial High School; Archbishop Molloy Lions; Mary Louis Hilltoppers (girls)
- Accreditation: Middle States Association of Colleges and Schools
- Publication: The Little Portion Literary Magazine
- Newspaper: The Seraph
- Yearbook: San Fran
- Tuition: $10,600 (2023–2024)
- Website: www.sfponline.org

Proper name Saint Francis Preparatory School, commonly referred to as St. Francis Preparatory School or St. Francis Prep., is a private, independent Catholic college preparatory school in Fresh Meadows, Queens, New York City, New York. It is the largest non-diocesan Catholic high school in the United States. St. Francis is run by the Franciscan Brothers of Brooklyn, who maintain a residence on the top floor of the school. As of the 2015–16 school year, enrollment at St. Francis was 2,489.

== History ==
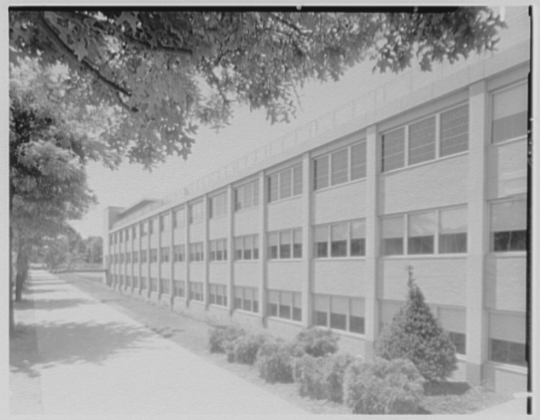
The Queens building as Bishop Reilly High School in 1963

St. Francis Preparatory originated as St. Francis Academy, a small all-boys high school on 300 Baltic Street in Brooklyn, New York, founded by the Franciscans Brothers of Brooklyn (O.S.F.). The college section became St. Francis College, a private predominantly undergraduate college in Brooklyn Heights. It took its current name in 1935, then moved to a larger facility in Williamsburg, Brooklyn in 1952. The school moved to its current location in Fresh Meadows, Queens in 1974 when it acquired the facility that formerly housed Bishop Reilly High School, a co-educational Catholic high school. The school began admitting female students that same year. A fitness center was added recently and the science labs are being updated. There are currently plans to add a three-story addition to the rear of the existing building. The upgrades to the art rooms will support students in the studio, digital and the performing arts.

== Co-curricular activities and athletics ==
St. Francis Prep has a rivalry with Holy Cross High School, fueled particularly by their football teams. Known as the "Battle of the Boulevard" due to the two schools being located only 2 miles apart on Francis Lewis Boulevard, the rivalry between the Prep Terriers and the Holy Cross Knights has been called "arguably the greatest rivalry in New York City football."

== Notable alumni ==
- Ted Alexandro, stand-up comedian
- William Alfred, Harvard professor, poet, playwright
- Frank J. Aquila, corporate lawyer
- Marco Battaglia, NFL football player
- Michelle Betos, NWSL goalkeeper
- Des Bishop, stand-up comedian
- Vincent DePaul Breen, former Bishop of Diocese of Metuchen
- Patti Ann Browne, news anchor for the Fox News Channel
- Tiffany Cabán, member of the New York City Council
- Julie Chen, former news anchor for CBS, Daytime Emmy Award winning co-host of The Talk and hostess of reality show Big Brother
- Carlos Dengler, former bassist of band Interpol
- Gerry DiNardo, former college football coach and current Big Ten Network commentator
- James Dooley, Emmy Award-winning composer
- Sonny Dove (1963), college and NBA basketball player, fourth pick of 1967 NBA draft
- Emily Engstler (2018), WNBA basketball player on Indiana Fever and 2022 U23 3x3 USA National Basketball team member
- Peter Facinelli, actor
- Kyle Flood, University of Texas football offensive coordinator and former Rutgers football head coach.
- Eric Gioia, New York City councilman
- Abbas "Bas" Hamad, rapper
- Dan Henning, NFL football player and coach
- Gary Janetti, television writer, producer, author and actor
- Ed Jenkins, NFL football player
- Peter King, former Republican U.S. Representative of New York's 3rd and 2nd districts from 1993 to 2021.
- Vince Lombardi, former Green Bay Packers coach and namesake of the Lombardi Award and the Vince Lombardi Trophy
- Glen Mazzara, writer and television producer
- Joanne Persico, volleyball coach
- Bill Pickel, NFL football player and sports broadcaster
- Keith Powers, American politician, Democrat, and council member for the 4th district of the New York City Council
- Joe Santagato, YouTuber and podcaster
- Joe Schad (born c. 1974) is a reporter, writer, analyst and broadcaster
- Frank Serpico, New York police officer known for uncovering corruption
- Father Robert S. Smith, American Catholic priest, author, and educator
- Joe Torre, former MLB player, former New York Mets, Atlanta Braves, St. Louis Cardinals, New York Yankees and Los Angeles Dodgers manager
