= Long Islander News =

Newspaper in Huntington, New York

- Publisher: Pete Sloggatt
- Editor: Pete Sloggatt
- Founded: 1838, by Walt Whitman
- Headquarters: Huntington, New York
- Circulation: 7,000
- Website: www.longislandernews.com

Long Islander News is a local news organization that covers the town of Huntington, New York. The organization's flagship newspaper, The Long-Islander, was founded by American poet Walt Whitman in 1838. It is the oldest continuously published community newspaper on Long Island.

Currently, Long Islander News publishes The Long-Islander and Huntington Weekly newspapers:

- The Long-Islander reports on the entire Town of Huntington, including Huntington, Huntington Station, Greenlawn, Centerport, Huntington Bay, Cold Spring Harbor, Lloyd Harbor, Dix Hills and Melville, Northport, East Northport, Elwood, Asharoken, Eaton's Neck, and parts of Fort Salonga and Commack.
- Huntington Weekly is a lifestyle and entertainment publication that is included as a second section to The Long-Islander, and is also distributed as a standalone to select Newsday subscribers through a partnership.

Defunct publications:

- The Northport Journal, was an arts and culture publication.
- Half Hollow Hills, was a newspaper that covered the areas of Dix Hills and Melville
- The Record, was a newspaper that covered Northport, East Northport, Elwood, Asharoken, Eaton's Neck and half of Fort Salonga and Commack.

== Sales ==
The flagship newspaper, The Long-Islander is available via subscription, and can be purchased in local stores. Circulation of The Long-Islander exceeds 7,000.

In 2016, the company launched Huntington Weekly, bringing readers more lifestyle and entertainment feature stories, and adding an additional 7,000 in circulation.

Long Islander Newspapers' company office is located on Wall Street in Huntington village.
