= Joanne Persico =

American college volleyball coach

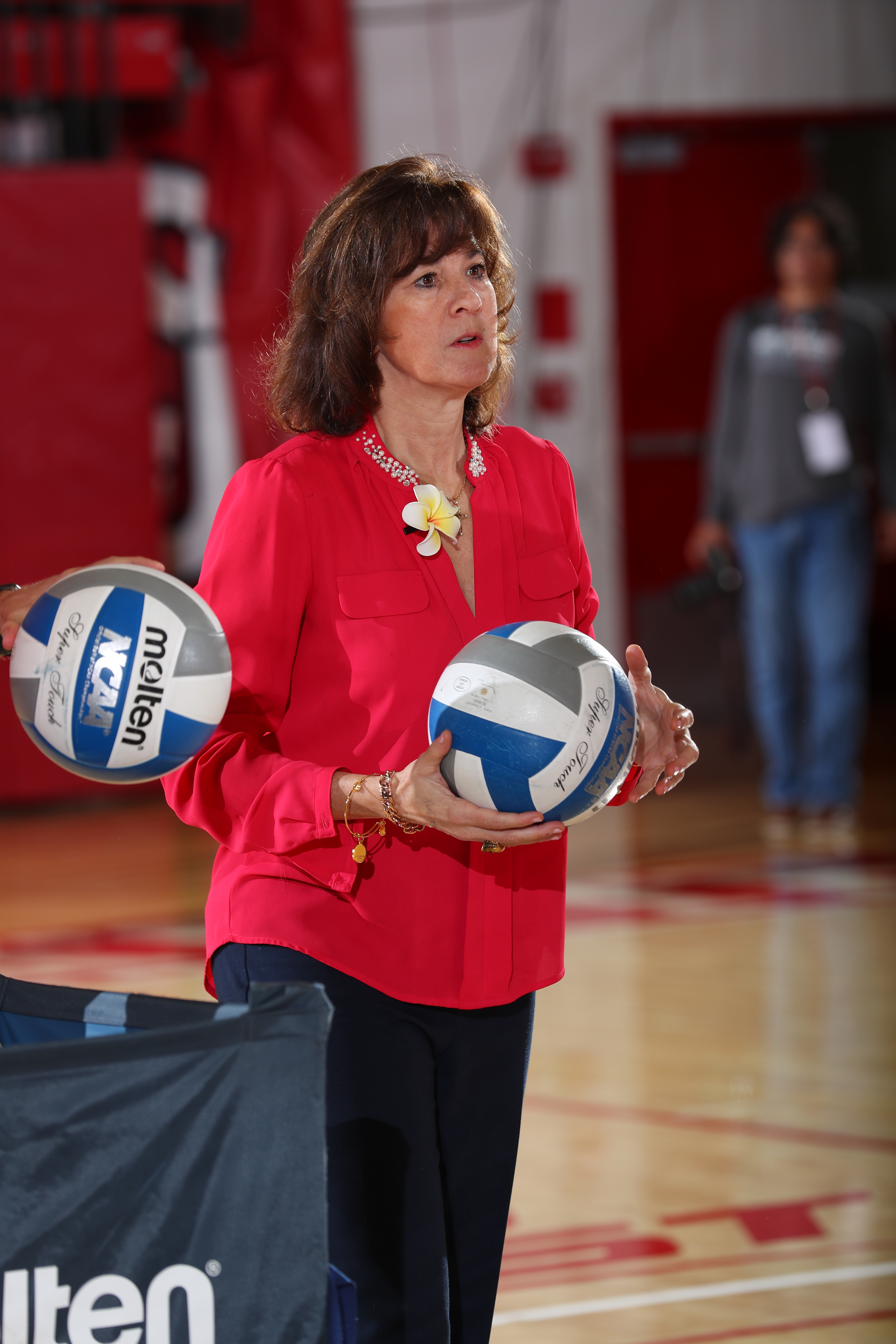

Current position
- Title: Head coach
- Team: St. John's
- Conference: Big East
- Record: 603–420 (.589)

Biographical details
- Born: June 3, 1966 (age 60); Brooklyn, New York

Playing career
- 1984–1986: Syracuse

Coaching career (HC unless noted)
- 1994–present: St.John's

Head coaching record
- Overall: 603–420

Accomplishments and honors

Championships
- 4× Big East Regular season (2006–2008, 2020) 2× Big East Tournament (2007, 2019)

Awards
- 3× Big East Coach of the Year (2006, 2018, 2023) 2× AVCA East Coast Region Coach of the Year (2006, 2023)

Joanne Persico is an American collegiate volleyball coach and former collegiate volleyball player and the winningest coach at any sport at St. John's University with 603 career wins. She is an American collegiate volleyball coach and former collegiate volleyball player. In 1987, she was named Big East Player of the Year. Since 1994, she has been the women's volleyball head coach at St. John's University in New York City, now an NCAA Division I team. In 2006, 2018, and 2023, she was named the Big East Coach of the Year. Persico has tallied 603 career victories and six Big East titles throughout her 32 seasons as head coach. Her total is the 15th most by any active Division I women's volleyball coach. She is the fifth longest-tenured women's volleyball coach at a single program and has tallied the seventh most wins among those coaches. In 1991, Persico was enshrined as an inaugural member of the Catholic High School Athletic Association (CHSAA) Hall of Fame. She later became just the second woman ever to be inducted into the St. Francis Prep School Hall of Fame in 2004. On August 14, 2025, Persico was inducted into the Order of Sons & Daughters of Italy in America (OSDIA) Sports Hall of Fame. Persico became the first-ever volleyball coach to be presented with the accolade, joining sporting icons 13-time World Series Champion Yogi Berra, U.S. Men's Ice Hockey Captain of the "Miracle on Ice" Mike Eruzione and 12-time NCAA Champion Geno Auriemma.

== Biography ==
=== Early life and education ===
A native of Bellerose, New York, Persico played volleyball at her elementary school, St. Gregory the Great Catholic Academy. She later played volleyball for St. Francis Preparatory School. and for the Big Apple Volleyball 18-and-under club team.

Persico attended Syracuse University. In 1987, she was named Big East Player of the Year during her senior year. After starting a career in sales at Cablevision on Long Island and Liberty Mutual in Manhattan, she was hired in 1994 to coach the newly formed St. John’s volleyball team.

=== Coaching career ===
Persico was named Big East Coach of the Year in 2006, 2018 and 2023. She has led St. John's to six Big East Conference Championships, 14 20-win seasons, four NIVC Tournament appearances (2018, 2022, 2023,2024), one NIVC Fab Four appearance (2024) and three NCAA Tournament appearances. Persico has racked up 569 all-time victories at the helm of the Red Storm volleyball program.

On August 27, 2022, Persico won her 527th match as a head coach as her Red Storm defeated Appalachian State in five sets. With the win, the Bellerose, New York native passed legendary St. John's men's basketball coach Lou Carnesecca for the most wins of any coach at St. John's University. She is the winningest female coach at the university all-time. Persico is the winningest Big East women's volleyball coach at a singular program in history. Among all active Big East coaches, Persico has the most career wins and the most at their current institution.

Persico helped St. John's capture its sixth conference title after securing first place in the Big East's East Division during the spring 2021 season. She also helped coach the program's fourth-ever Big East Player of the year in Rachele Rastelli. Rastelli was named the 2021 Big East Co-Player of the Year after taking the country by storm finishing in the top 50 in four different statistical categories. Persico recruited her to play for the Red Storm from Parma, Italy. Rastelli joins Efrosini Alexakou, Hui Ping Huang and Wioleta Leszczynska as the only Johnnies to ever earn the conference's top honor.

Persico and the Red Storm earned an automatic bid to the 2019 NCAA Tournament, marking the program's third-ever appearance. In 2019, Persico helped St. John's capture the Big East Tournament Championship after entering the tournament as the fourth overall seed. The Red Storm swept then-No. 10 Creighton in the opening round, before defeating then-No. 12 Marquette to become the first fourth seed to win the title since the conference's reconfiguration in 2013.

In 2023, Persico guided the St. John’s volleyball program to immense success as it saw its 13th and second consecutive 20-win season. Persico also led her squad to its fifth Big East Tournament in the last six years, going all the way to the program’s third title game after taking down Marquette, 3-2, in the semifinal round. St. John’s also was selected for its third National Invitational Volleyball Championship (NIVC) postseason tournament, making it to the second round.

Persico also received a slew of post season awards following the 2023 campaign, as she and her coaching staff were selected as the Big East Coaching Staff of the Year. The legendary St. John’s coach also was tabbed as the AVCA East Coach Region Coach of the Year. The team also received plenty of postseason accolades, as Erin Jones and Lucrezia Lodi were tabbed to the All-Big East Team. Rashanny Solano Smith was also named to the All-Big East Freshman Team. Jones continued to rack up postseason awards, as she also notched her first AVCA East Coast Region Team Selection.

In 2024, Persico led the Red Storm to yet another 20 win season, her 14th overall and third straight. Persico guided St. Johnís to its 13th Big East Tournament appearance. Her squad was selected to play in the Women's NIVC for the third consecutive year, making it to the Fab Four.

Persico continued coach to Erin Jones to yet another standout season. Jones broke the Big East triple-double record with eight in conference play. She finished the season with 11 triple-doubles and 13 double-doubles. The team was named an American Volleyball Coaches Association team academic award for the 12th straight year, boasting a 3.82 team GPA.

To kick off the 2025 season, she was inducted into the Order Sons and Daughters of Italy in America Sports Hall of Fame. This is the fourth time Persico was enshrined into a hall of fame, joining men's basketball head coach Rick Pitino and the legendary Lou Carnesecca to represent St. John's Athletics in the OSDIA Hall of Fame.
