= Sara Whalen =

American soccer player (born 1976)

Personal information
- Full name: Sara Eve Hess
- Birth name: Sara Eve Whalen
- Date of birth: April 28, 1976 (age 50)
- Place of birth: Natick, Massachusetts, U.S.
- Height: 5 ft 6 in (1.68 m)
- Position: Defender

College career
Years	Team	Apps	(Gls)
1994–1997	Connecticut Huskies		

Senior career*
Years	Team	Apps	(Gls)
1997–1999	Long Island Lady Riders		
2001–2002	New York Power	31	(0)

International career
1997–2000	United States	65	(7)
Medal record
Women's football (soccer)
Representing the United States
Olympic Games
Silver medal – second place	2000 Sydney	Team competition
FIFA Women's World Cup
Gold medal – first place	1999 United States	Team competition
- * Club domestic league appearances and goals

Sara Eve Hess (née Whalen; born April 28, 1976) is a retired American professional Olympic medalist soccer player. Whalen played for the United States Women's National Soccer Team from 1997 to 2000, won an Olympic silver medal with the team, and was a founding player of Women's United Soccer Association (WUSA). She is also the Co-Founder and President of upcoming men's professional soccer side USL Long Island.

== Early life ==
Born in Natick, Massachusetts, to John and Linda Whalen, Sara was raised in Greenlawn, New York, with her sister Deborah, and is Jewish. She attended Harborfields High School in her hometown, where she played varsity soccer, basketball, and track as a sprinter.

Whalen graduated from the University of Connecticut with a degree in psychology. She received her master's degree in psychology from Fordham University, and her doctorate from Fairleigh Dickinson University.

=== Connecticut Huskies ===
At the University of Connecticut she was a defender and forward for their Huskies women's soccer team. While playing soccer for Connecticut, Whalen was a three-time All-American and was the 1997 NSCAA Division 1 National Player of the Year, as well as being named to Soccer America's Collegiate Team of the Decade for the 1990s. She scored both goals in the 1997 NCAA Final Four semifinal match against Notre Dame, as Connecticut won 2–1 to record one of the biggest upsets in NCAA women's soccer history by defeating the previously unbeaten Irish. Whalen was the 1995 and 1996 Big East Defensive Player of the Year, before playing striker her senior season where she recorded 21 goals and 22 assists to lead her team in scoring. In her final season at UConn, Whalen was named Hermann and M.A.C. Trophy finalists. She also won the Honda Sports Award as the nation's top soccer player. She finished her college career with 23 goals and 43 assists. They retired her No. 8 jersey.

== Playing career ==
=== International ===
In 1997, Whalen began her career for the United States women's national soccer team as an outside defender. She earned her first cap against France, while still in college. The following year, 1998, Whalen had a very successful season scoring two goals and garnering three assists. Her role on the team was constantly redefined. She usually appeared as a late game substitute to add attacking speed from a wild midfield post. Because of her versatility, she could either increase the attacking pressure or function as a defensive midfielder as the game situation demands.

In 1999, Whalen helped the US Women's National Team win the 1999 FIFA Women's World Cup. This group is famously dubbed the "99er's"; each player helped change the face of women's sports forever. The World Cup was hosted in the United States in various stadiums including the Rose Bowl, Soldier Field, and Sanford Stadium. In the final game against China, neither side had scored and the game moved from extra time to penalty kicks. Whalen played every minute of extra-time in the final against China. Although she did not take a penalty kick, Whalen was the first to run up to Brandi Chastain after she secured the victory for the United States. Both were featured on the cover of Time Magazine and today it is still one of the most iconic images in sports history.

The following year, Whalen won a silver medal as a part of the US Women's Team at the 2000 Sydney Olympics. They lost to Norway in the final game 3–2.

=== Club ===
From 1997 through 1999, Whalen played for the club team the Long Island Lady Riders. In 1997, Whalen helped the Riders win the USL W-League Champions. In 1998, she returned to play for the Lady Riders but due to her commitment to the Women's National Team she was not able to return until after the World Cup. From 2001 through 2002, Whalen played for the New York Power where she made 31 appearances. Her season was cut short due to injury.

In 2001, Whalen was a founding player of the Women's United Soccer Association, playing alongside US teammates Christie Pearce and Tiffeny Milbrett for the New York Power. This was the world's first women's soccer league in which all of the players were paid as professionals. Whalen was one of the 20 founding players; a lot of which players were a part of the 1999 World Cup team including Mia Hamm, Kristine Lilly, and Michelle Akers.

On June 26, 2002, in a game against the Carolina Courage, Whalen tore her ACL and MCL in a collision with German international Birgit Prinz. This occurred just after recovering from a broken rib. Whalen had surgery, but noticed her knee was infected shortly thereafter. During her second surgery Whalen had a severe allergic reaction, nearly dying. The doctors realized that the infection was in one of the screws, within the ligament of her knee, which had to be removed. Whalen had to go through seven surgeries, including moving ligaments from her right to left knee, to repair her injury. This marked the end of her professional soccer career. During this injury time, she descended into a very dark place and questioned if she wanted to continue living. She felt that she had to grieve a life that she was leaving behind. She felt so much pain she stated, "your body can only sustain so much pain. It was like, ‘Just f****** end it. I can’t deal with this anymore.’” Her husband, Jon stated, "It's more than just playing soccer. You lose that sense of purpose." She was slowly able to piece back her life together and she used her education to sustain herself. It was a way for Whalen to occupy her time with something other than rehab on her knee. She was worrisome that she would not be good at a job in the psychology field because of all the trauma she endured. She was able to feel like she got some ownership back in her story and feels like her story helps her with her job. In 2004, after numerous leg surgeries she was able to run the New York Marathon in 4 hours 19 minutes and 38 seconds. After this event, she felt that she truly regained control of her narrative.

== International goals ==
No.	Date	Venue	Opponent	Score	Result	Competition
1.	June 23, 2000	Hersheypark Stadium, Hershey, United States	Trinidad and Tobago	10–0	11–0	2000 CONCACAF Women's Gold Cup
2.	June 23, 2000	Hersheypark Stadium, Hershey, United States	Trinidad and Tobago	11–0	11–0	2000 CONCACAF Women's Gold Cup
3.	June 25, 2000	Cardinal Stadium, Louisville, United States	Costa Rica	8–0	8–0	2000 CONCACAF Women's Gold Cup

== Personal life ==
Whalen lives outside of New York City with her husband, Jon Hess, a NASDAQ trader and former Princeton University lacrosse player, and their three children. She is now a licensed psychologist and cognitive behavioral therapist.

Looking back on her time at the World Cup and with the Women's National Team she says, "we have some piece of history that will never change and that we all feel really incredible about having in our back pocket. Whether we're playing soccer or coaching or aren't doing anything related to soccer, its still a part of our identity which is really, really special." She continues, "because of how much media plays a role in everything now, it's actually very difficult to be very humble because you sort of have to be an image, and you have to market yourself. I think it was a more enjoyable time to play then, maybe because we didn't have that concern. We were just wanting to win. We didn't have to look a certain way or be a certain thing, which was very much a blessing."

Whalen was inducted into the Suffolk Sports Hall of Fame on Long Island in the Soccer Category with the Class of 2001.

== See also ==
- List of Olympic medalists in football
- List of 2000 Summer Olympics medal winners
- List of select Jewish association football (soccer) players
