= Mill Dam Bridge =

Bridge in Suffolk County, New York

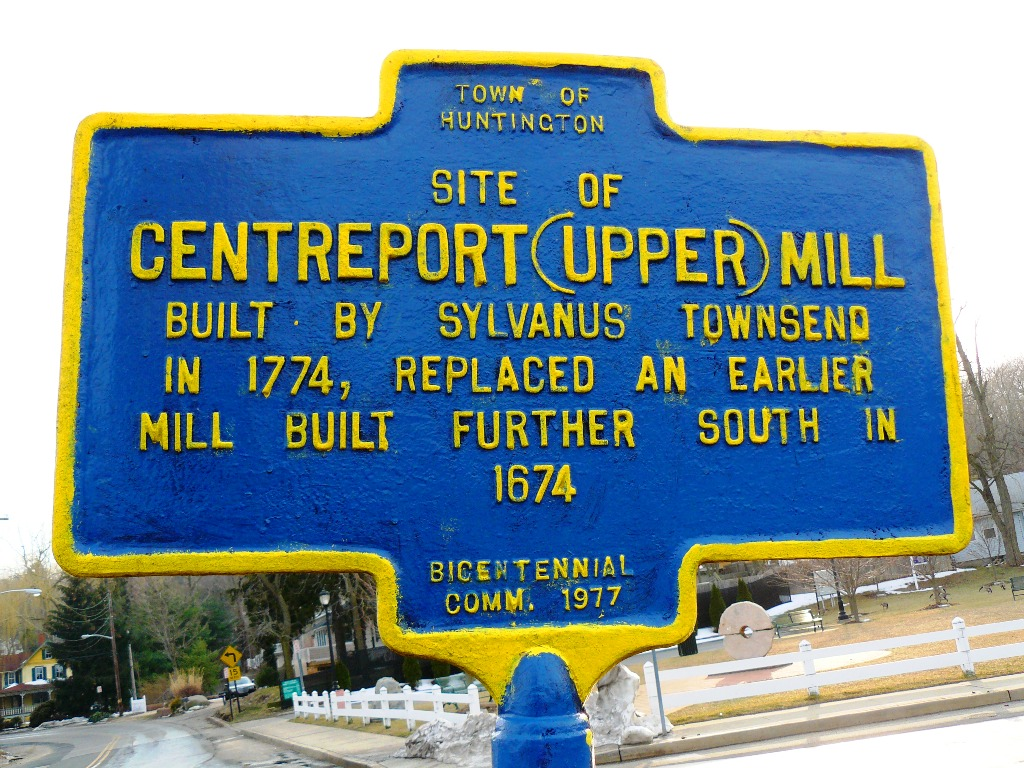
- New York Bicentennial Commission historical marker in Centerport, New York marking the Mill Dam Bridge
- Coordinates: 40°53′34″N 73°22′23″W
- Carries: Mill Dam Road
- Crosses: Centerport Harbor
- Locale: Centerport, Suffolk County, New York

Characteristics
- Material: Prestressed concrete

History
- Constructed by: Sylvanus Townsend
- Opened: 1774
- Rebuilt: 2005

Location
- Interactive map of Mill Dam Bridge

The Mill Dam Bridge carries Mill Dam Road across the tidal mudflat of Centerport Harbor on the North Shore of Long Island, in Centerport, Suffolk County, New York. It divides the navigable waters of the harbor from the Mill Pond formed by its tidegates.

The original Mill Dam and tide mill were built in 1674 at a site south of the present location. The bridge at the current location was first constructed in 1774 by Sylvanus Townsend. The mill was dismantled in 1915, and parts of it were used to construct the nearby William Kissam Vanderbilt II estate, which is now the Vanderbilt Museum. The current Mill Dam Bridge prestressed concrete center span and tidegates built in 2005 replaced the span from 1936. The replacement project won the 2005 American Council of Engineering Companies (ACEC) Long Island Project of the Year Award.

The bridge was closed to traffic in October 2007, due to deterioration of the old causeway connecting the new span to the shore. In February 2008, workers making repairs to the causeway unearthed a 3000 pound (1400 kilogram) gear, believed to have been installed at the tide mill during an 1848 overhaul. It reopened to traffic on June 27, 2008.

== Grist Mill Park ==
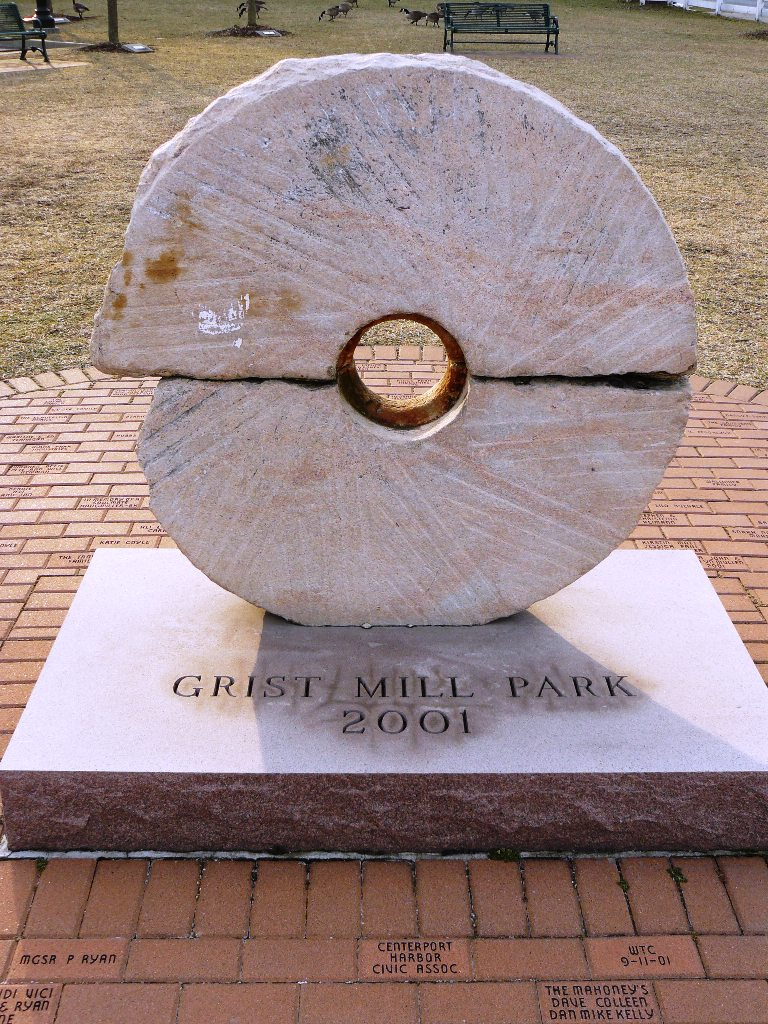
A historic gristmill millstone, the Grist Mill Park centerpiece

In 2001, the town of Huntington, New York opened the Grist Mill Park on a plot adjacent to the west end of Mill Dam Bridge, the site of the former Rockhopper's restaurant, and Vengroff, Williams, & Associates Collection Agency, severely damaged during a fire a few years earlier. The Centerport-Greenlawn Historical Society donated the park's centerpiece, a historic gristmill millstone.
