= Greenlawn, New York =

- Hamlet and census-designated place
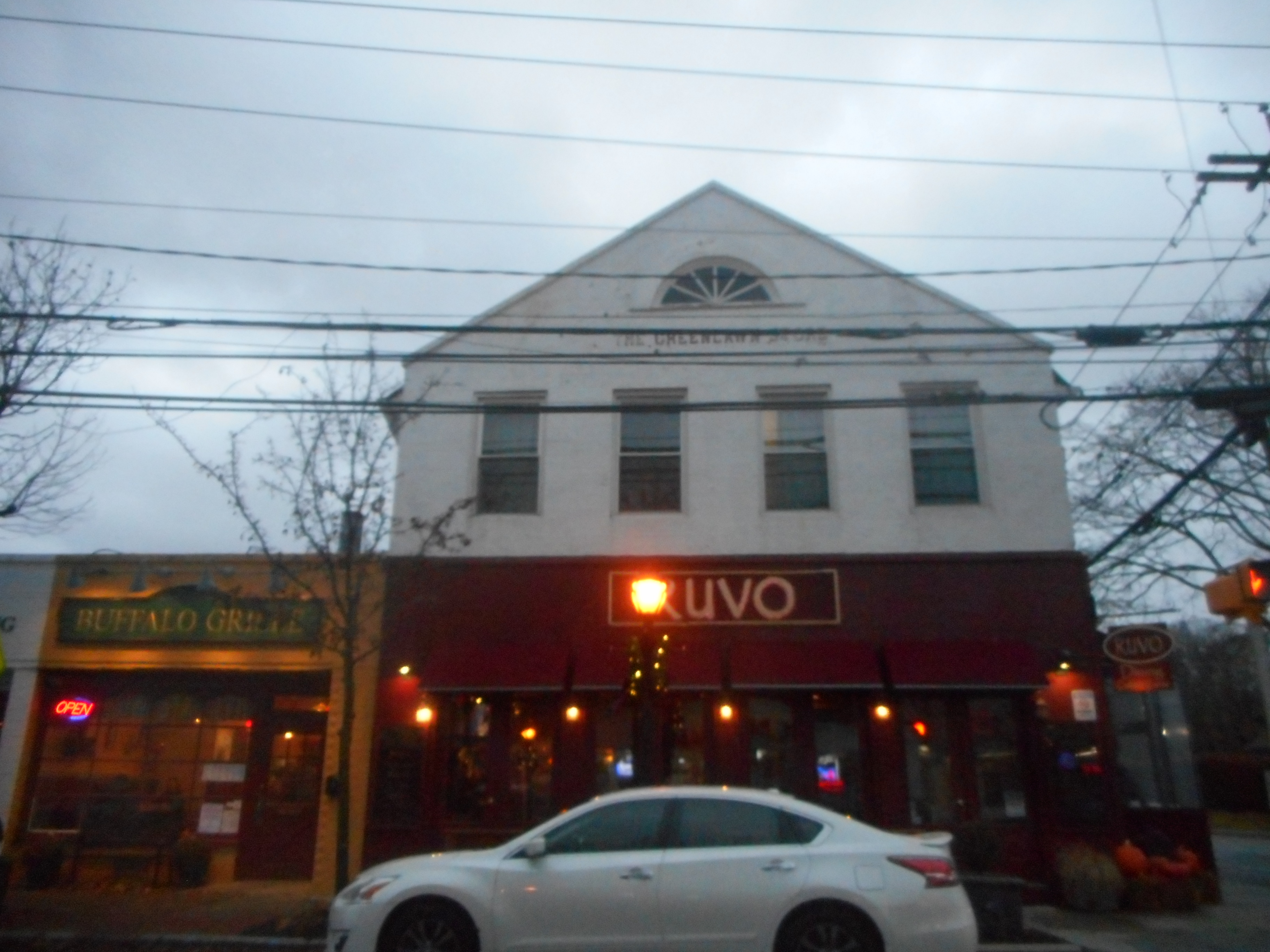
- The Greenlawn Store on Broadway; November 2019

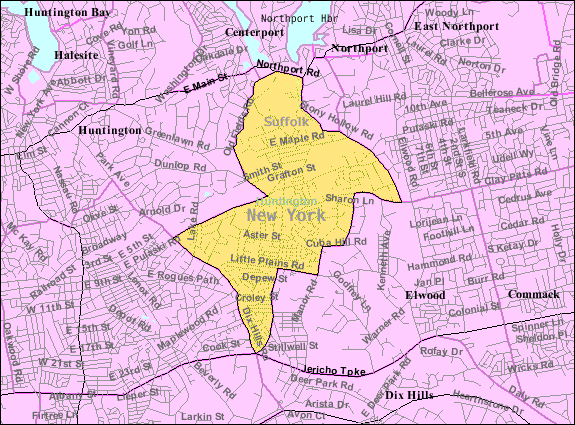
- U.S. Census map

- Location within the state of New York
- Coordinates: 40°51′28″N 73°21′57″W
- Country: United States
- State: New York
- County: Suffolk

Area
  - Total: 3.83 sq mi (9.92 km^{2})
  - Land: 3.83 sq mi (9.91 km^{2})
  - Water: 0.0039 sq mi (0.01 km^{2})
- Elevation: 226 ft (69 m)

Population (2020)
  - Total: 13,661
  - Density: 3,570.8/sq mi (1,378.71/km^{2})
- Time zone: UTC-5 (Eastern (EST))
  - Summer (DST): UTC-4 (EDT)
- ZIP codes: 11740 & 11743
- Area code: 631
- FIPS code: 36-30543
- GNIS feature ID: 0951752

Greenlawn is a hamlet and census-designated place (CDP) in Suffolk County, New York, United States. Located on Long Island in the Town of Huntington, Greenlawn had a population of 13,661 at the 2020 census.

== History ==
While known as Old Fields, in 1842, the Henry Smith Farmstead was the site of the murder of farmer Alexander Smith and his wife. The suspect was a German employed by Mr. Smith with a reported motive of theft. The town was renamed Greenlawn following the expansion of the Long Island Rail Road in 1871, which connected to the nearby villages of Northport and Port Jefferson. The LIRR chose the name Greenlawn for its station, apparently to project an idyllic rural/suburban image and foster resort travel to the beaches in Centerport.

Greenlawn was well known for its pickle production during the 19th century, as well as, to a lesser degree, potato and cabbage farms. An escaped enslaved man, Samuel Ballton earned the moniker "The Pickle King" following his success in gathering pickles. The principal commodity, pickles, is still celebrated by the annual Pickle Festival, hosted by the local Greenlawn-Centerport Historical Association.

== Geography ==
Greenlawn is located at 40°51′28″N 73°21′57″W (40.857648, -73.365932).

According to the United States Census Bureau, the census-designated place (CDP) has a total area of 3.7 square miles (9.6 km^{2}), all land.

The Greenlawn postal office zip code is 11740.

== Education ==
Greenlawn is primarily served by Harborfields Central School District, although very small portions are served by the Elwood Union Free School District and South Huntington Union Free School District.

== Demographics ==
=== 2020 census ===
As of the 2020 census, Greenlawn had a population of 13,661.

The median age was 43.6 years. 21.8% of residents were under the age of 18 and 19.5% of residents were 65 years of age or older. For every 100 females there were 90.6 males, and for every 100 females age 18 and over there were 86.2 males age 18 and over.

100.0% of residents lived in urban areas, while 0.0% lived in rural areas.

There were 4,524 households in Greenlawn, of which 34.8% had children under the age of 18 living in them. Of all households, 56.0% were married-couple households, 12.8% were households with a male householder and no spouse or partner present, and 27.3% were households with a female householder and no spouse or partner present. About 22.5% of all households were made up of individuals and 14.8% had someone living alone who was 65 years of age or older.

There were 4,669 housing units, of which 3.1% were vacant. The homeowner vacancy rate was 0.9% and the rental vacancy rate was 2.1%.

Racial composition as of the 2020 census
Race	Number	Percent
White	8,692	63.6%
Black or African American	1,724	12.6%
American Indian and Alaska Native	72	0.5%
Asian	781	5.7%
Native Hawaiian and Other Pacific Islander	1	0.0%
Some other race	1,034	7.6%
Two or more races	1,357	9.9%
Hispanic or Latino (of any race)	2,420	17.7%

=== 2010 census ===
As of the census of 2010, there were 13,742 people, 4,560 households, and 3,345 families residing in the CDP. The population density was 3,714.1 inhabitants per square mile (1,434.0/km^{2}). There were 4,722 housing units at an average density of 1,276.2 per square mile (492.7/km^{2}). The racial makeup of the CDP was 74.0% White, 13.9% African American, 0.4% Native American, 4.1% Asian, 0.01% Pacific Islander, 4.9% some other race, and 2.7% from two or more races. Hispanic or Latino of any race were 12.5% of the population.

There were 4,560 households, out of which 39.6% had children under the age of 18 living with them, 57.8% were headed by married couples living together, 11.9% had a female householder with no husband present, and 26.6% were non-families. 22.4% of all households were made up of individuals, and 13.8% were someone living alone who was 65 years of age or older. The average household size was 2.94 and the average family size was 3.45.

In the CDP, the population was spread out, with 25.6% under the age of 18, 7.0% from 18 to 24, 22.7% from 25 to 44, 28.2% from 45 to 64, and 16.6% who were 65 years of age or older. The median age was 41.9 years. For every 100 females, there were 92.4 males. For every 100 females age 18 and over, there were 87.8 males.

=== Income and poverty ===
For the period 2007-2011, the median annual income for a household in the CDP was $92,664, and the median income for a family was $116,768. Males had a median income of $73,659 versus $59,107 for females. The per capita income for the CDP was $40,484. About 2.1% of families and 3.5% of the population were below the poverty line, including 0.8% of those under age 18 and 9.6% of those age 65 or over.

== In popular culture ==
=== Films ===
- The independent film Have Yourself a Merry Little Christmas was filmed in Greenlawn in late 2005 and early 2006.
- The independent film L.I.E. had shots filmed in Harborfields High School.

=== Events ===
- Greenlawn is well known for its annual pickle festival.
- Members of the Greenlawn Fire Department hold an annual Greenlawn Firemans Fair on Labor Day weekend. First held in 1906, it is known as the oldest and largest in New York state.

=== Notable people ===
- Greenlawn Fire Chief 1999-2000 Steve Fellmeth
- The artist Cindy Sherman grew up in Greenlawn. She attended, and graduated from Harborfields High School
- The pop singer Mariah Carey grew up in Greenlawn. She attended, and graduated from Harborfields High School.
- Jeff Hawkins, born in 1957 in Huntington, New York, and who graduated from Harborfields High School in 1975, is the founder of Palm Computing where he invented the Palm Pilot, and Handspring where he invented the Treo.
- Fay Kellogg, called the foremost woman architect in the US, summered on a farm that she owned in Greenlawn. She also designed and supervised the building of Greenlawn's post office east of Broadway behind the train station in 1911.
- Christine Frederick, home economist and proponent of Taylorism, performed household experiments from her house on Cuba Hill Road.
- The late Karl Linnas, surveyor and alleged war criminal and Nazi collaborator in Nazi-occupied Estonia during World War II.
- The late Charles Ludlam, actor, playwright and founder of the Theater of the Ridiculous in New York City, grew up in Greenlawn and graduated from Harborfields High School.
- Sara Whalen (born 1976), Olympic medalist soccer player
- Clark Gillies, Hockey Hall of Fame inductee, four time Stanley Cup Champion (1979-1983), and former Captain of the New York Islanders, resided in Greenlawn until his death in January 21, 2022.
- Matt Coronato is a professional ice hockey forward for the Calgary Flames of the National Hockey League who grew up in Greenlawn.

Historical Sites

- John Gardiner Farm - Original house was built in the 1750s. The property is now owned by the Greenlawn-Centerport Historical Association.
