= Babylon Town Hall =

- U.S. National Register of Historic Places
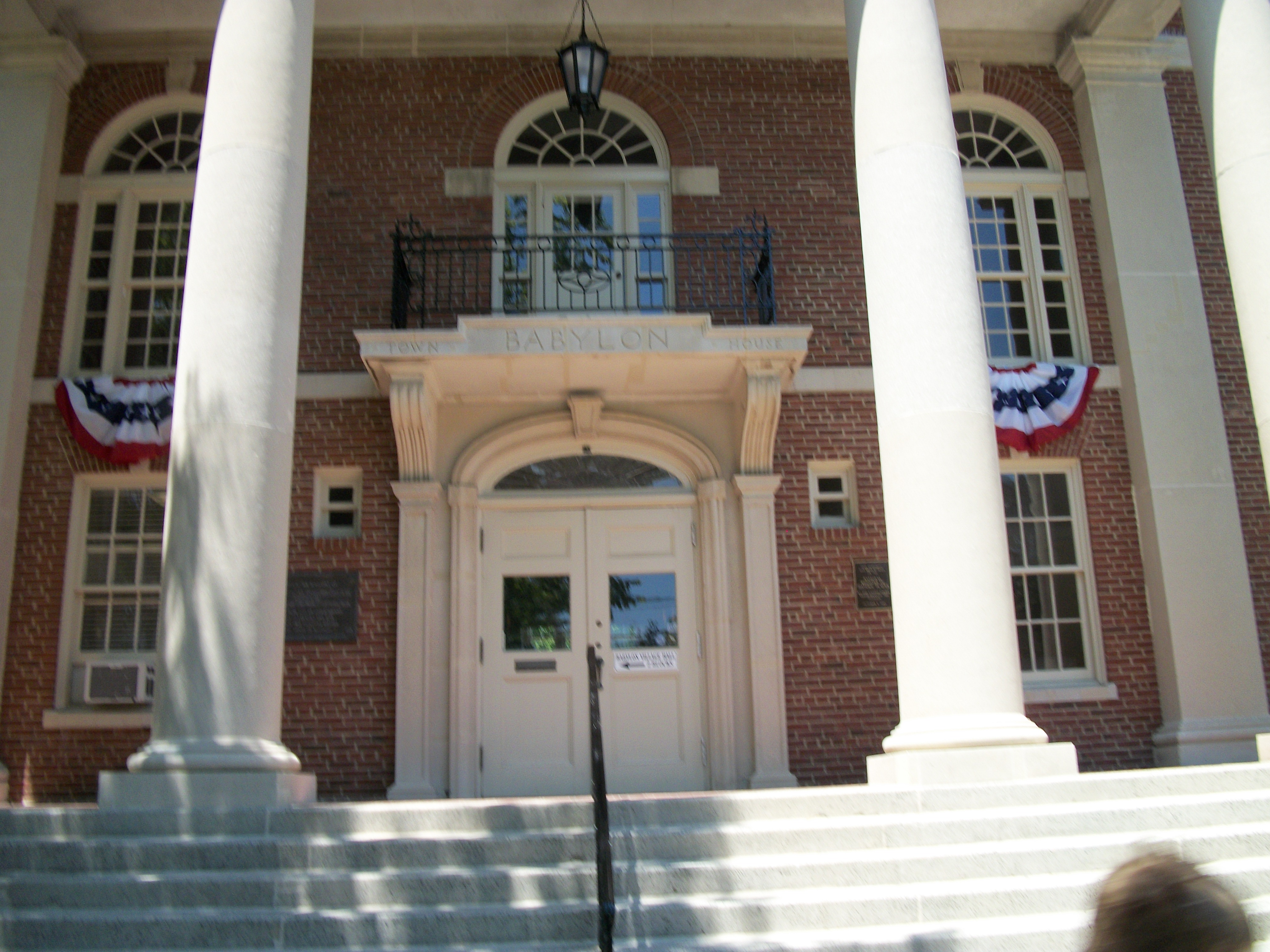
- The entrance to the old Babylon Town Hall

- Location within New York Location within the United States
- Location: 47 West Main Street, Babylon, New York
- Coordinates: 40°41′47.4″N 73°19′26.4″W
- Area: less than one acre
- Architect: Inglee, Lewis; Cornwell, Moses R.
- Architectural style: Classical Revival
- NRHP reference No.: 05001131
- Added to NRHP: October 05, 2005

Babylon Town Hall – also known as Town of Babylon Old Town Hall – is a historic town hall located within the Incorporated Village of Babylon in Suffolk County, New York, United States.

== Description ==
It was built in 1917 and is a 2 1/2-story Classical Revival style building with a low hipped roof. It is rectangular in shape, approximately 58 feet long and 54 feet wide. It features a cupola at the center of the roof and a large 2-story portico with four Doric order columns. It housed town offices until 1958, and housed district courts until 1979, when it was sold. Old Town Hall was purchased back by the town in June 2004 and rededicated on Sunday, October 24, 2004.

It was added to the National Register of Historic Places in 2005. A historical marker was erected by the Town of Babylon in 1986.

== See also ==
- National Register of Historic Places listings in Babylon, New York
- North Hempstead Town Hall
