= Harborfields High School =

Location
- 98 Taylor Avenue; Greenlawn, New York 11740; United States; 40°52′06″N 73°21′32″W

Information
- School type: Public, secondary
- Established: 1956
- School district: Harborfields Central School District
- Principal: Neil Lederer
- Teaching staff: 85.06 (FTE)
- Grades: 9–12
- Enrollment: 923 (2024–2025)
- Student to teacher ratio: 10.85
- Colors: Green and white
- Mascot: Tornadoes
- Newspaper: The Harbinger
- Website: Harborfields High School

Harborfields High School is a four-year secondary school located in Greenlawn, New York, United States. It functions as the sole high school for Harborfields Central School District, encompassing the communities of Centerport and Greenlawn along with parts of Huntington and Northport. In 2011, the school was ranked 88th on Newsweek's list of Top 1300 High Schools in America.

The Class of 1960 was the first graduating class, with about 130 graduates from Centerport and Greenlawn only. That first class used the building for four years as it was being completed.

The name Harborfields came from a combination of the older names of Centerport (Little Cow Harbor) and Greenlawn (Old Fields), selected from an entry in a naming contest in about 1958.

Harborfields High School can be seen in Mariah Carey's documentary "Mariah Carey's Homecoming" which aired on December 14, 1999 on Fox.

== Athletics ==
Harborfields' sports team is known as the Tornadoes. Its colors are dark green and white. Harborfields offers the following sports:

- Varsity Baseball
- Varsity Basketball
- Varsity Bowling
- Varsity Cheer
- Varsity Cross Country
- Varsity Field Hockey
- Varsity / JV Football
- Varsity Golf
- Varsity Gymnastics
- Varsity Indoor Track and Field
- Varsity Lacrosse
- Varsity Soccer
- Varsity Softball
- Varsity Swimming
- Varsity Tennis
- Varsity Track and Field
- Varsity Volleyball
- Varsity Wrestling

=== Achievements ===
In 2025, Tristan Blake won the New York State Class B long jump championship. He was the first Harborfields athlete to win the state championship in long jump.

Football won the Suffolk County championship in 1994, 1995, 1996, 1999, and 2001 and the Long Island Championship in 1994 and 1996.

Field Hockey won the Suffolk County Class B championship in 2024, defeating Miller Place 5-1.

Boys Soccer won the Suffolk County Class A championship in 2021, defeating East Hampton 1-0.

Boys Basketball won the New York State Class A championship in 2012.

== Notable alumni ==
- Mariah Carey, singer-songwriter-producer and actress
- Brian "Mitts" Daniels, Madball guitarist
- Mike Fagan, professional bowler
- Buzz Feiten, guitarist, inventor
- John J. Flanagan, Republican New York state senator
- Matt Frevola, UFC fighter
- Jeff Hawkins, inventor of the Palm Pilot and co-founder of Palm Computing.
- Gregg "Opie" Hughes, radio host
- Noah Kalina, Art photographer
- Sean Keys, baseball player
- Brittany Lauda, voice actress and director
- Mark Millon, former All-World lacrosse player
- Sara Whalen, Olympic medalist soccer player
