= Vanderbilt Museum =

Historic house in New York, United States

- William K. Vanderbilt Estate-Eagles Nest
- U.S. National Register of Historic Places
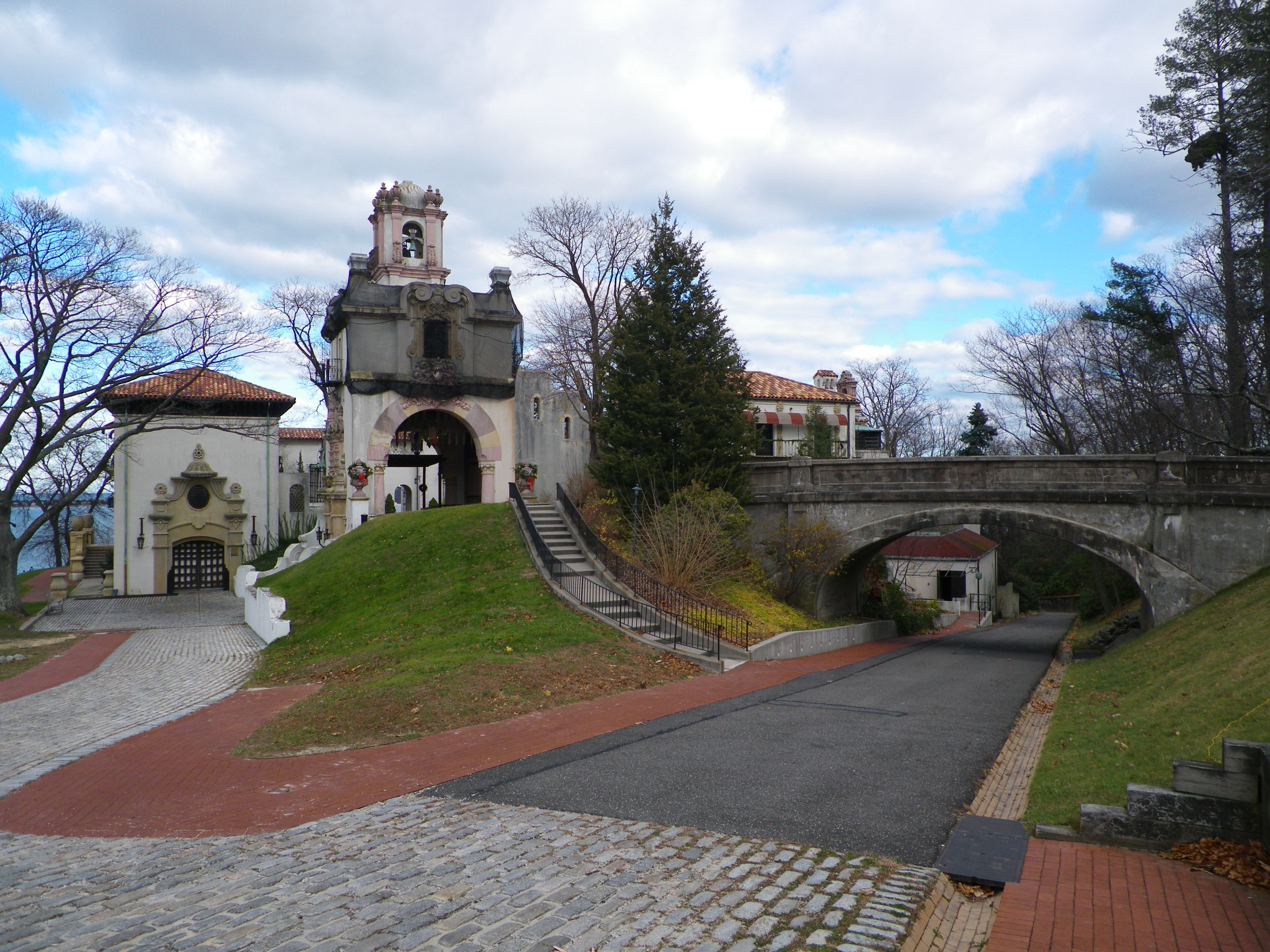

- Location within New York Location within the United States
- Location: 180 Little Neck Road, Centerport, New York 11721
- Coordinates: 40°54′18″N 73°22′4″W
- Area: 43 acres (17 ha)
- Architect: Warren and Wetmore
- Architectural style: Spanish Revival
- MPS: Huntington Town MRA
- NRHP reference No.: 85002545 (original); 100006094 (increase)

Significant dates
- Added to NRHP: September 26, 1985
- Boundary increase: February 2, 2021

The Vanderbilt Museum is located in Centerport on the North Shore of Long Island in Suffolk County, New York, USA. Named for William Vanderbilt II (1878–1944), it is located on his former 43-acre (17 ha) estate, Eagle's Nest.

== History ==
William K. Vanderbilt II's will provided for donation of his property to the county, with provision that the mansion and grounds be used for a museum for his marine, natural history, and ethnographic collections; the natural history institution was established during 1950. Developing a museum that interprets Vanderbilt's life, times, and collections, the county constructed a planetarium on the grounds during 1970.

Vanderbilt's enclave was constructed in three installments. The first project was the building of a 24-room Spanish revival mansion designed by New York architecture firm Warren and Wetmore, one of two firms responsible for designing and constructing New York's Grand Central Terminal, another product of the Vanderbilt family execution. The duration of the three stages lasted from 1910 to 1936. Since the 1930s the mansion and the museum has been home to what is probably the mummy of a young woman who was originally buried at Deir el-Bahari. She was originally purchased by Vanderbilt II in 1931 from an antiques shop located in Cairo.

The museum complex, operated by Suffolk County, includes the mansion with furnishings and fine art, a marine museum with marine and natural history specimens (butterflies, birds, shells, mammals and fish), a curator's cottage, a seaplane hangar, a boathouse, gardens, and a collection of ethnographic objects (firearms and swords, ship models, and European, Asian and African objects). The museum was listed on the National Register of Historic Places on September 26, 1985.

== Living history tours ==
Occasionally, the museum offers a "living history tour" of the museum. Acting in costume, the staff enacts a performance about the era of the Gold Coast socialites, drawing on information gleaned from Vanderbilt's personal journal and historical archives about other owners and workers.

== Planetarium ==
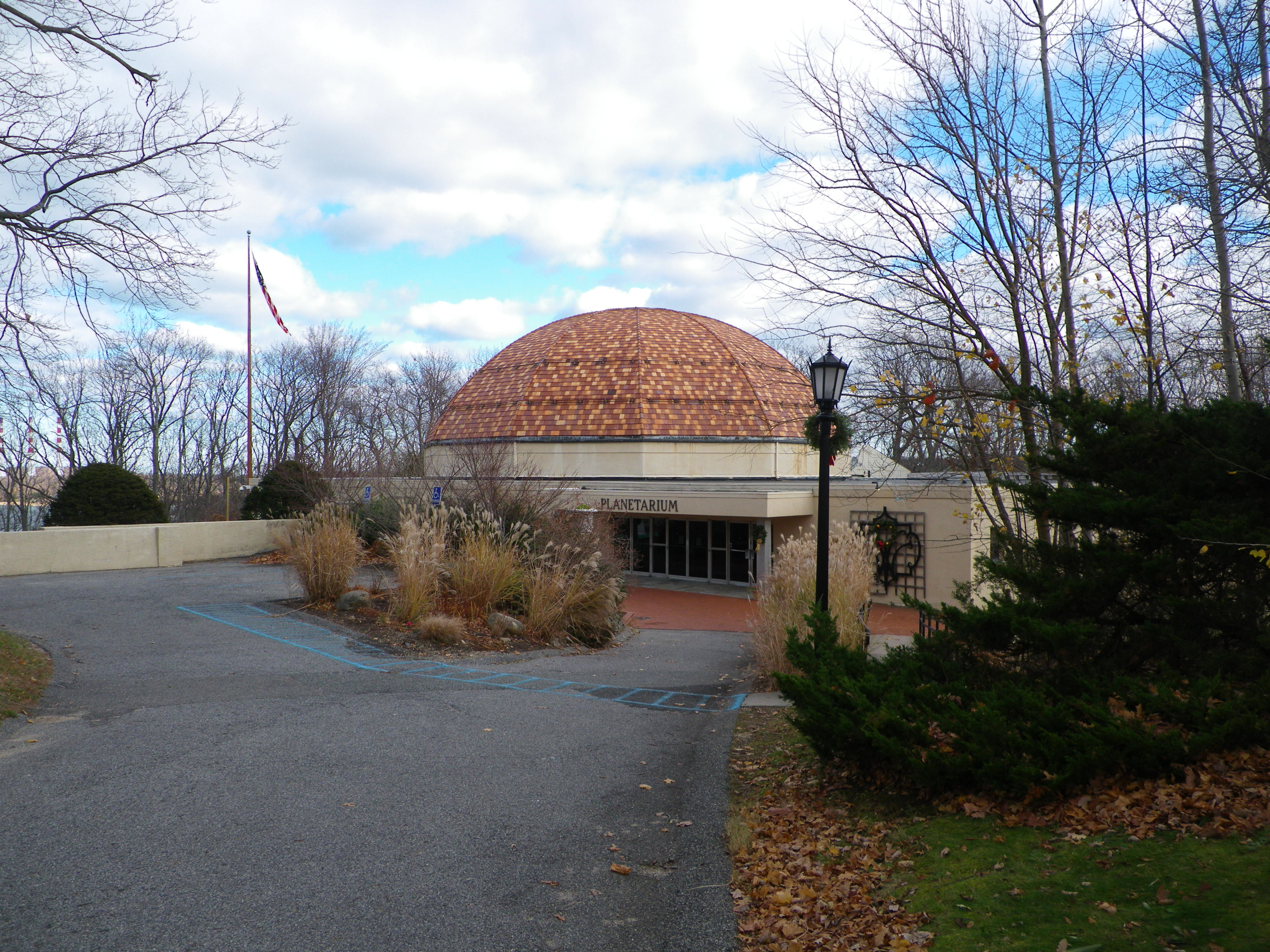
The planetarium building

The planetarium opened in 1971. It became "the forerunner, the prototype of so many others that were subsequently built around this country,” said Mark Levine, director of the planetarium and associate professor of astronomy at Hofstra University.

In 2013, the planetarium reopened after a major renovation that replaced the roof, carpets, and seats; and upgraded the gift shop, lobby, ticket office, and other interior and exterior features. The planetarium includes a Konica Minolta GeminiStar III projector, full dome display projector, and surround-sound technology.

The planetarium features an observatory that is open to the public on Friday nights. The observatory has a 16" Meade LX200R, and utilizes a roll-off roof design.

== Gallery ==
View toward the main house

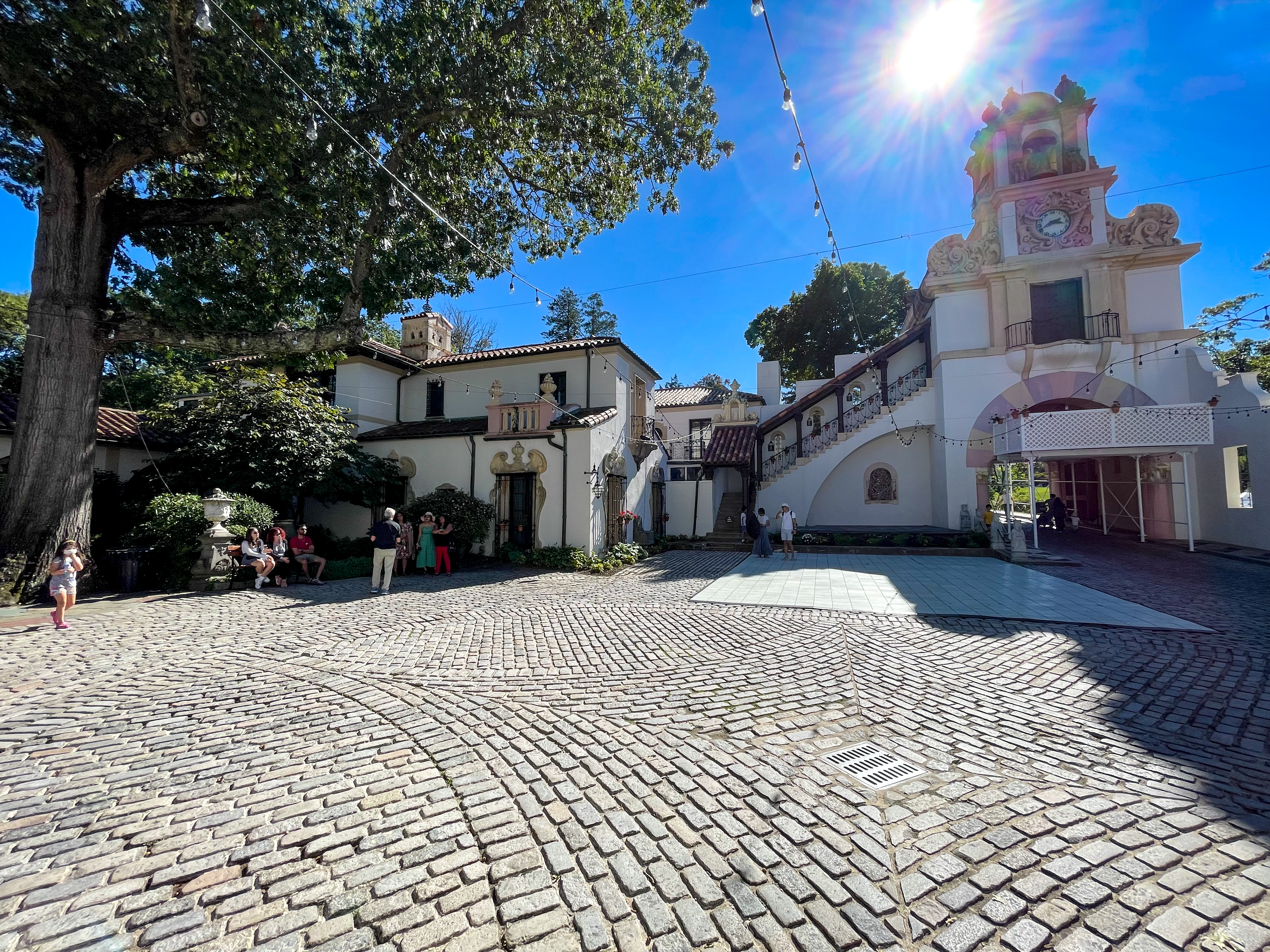
Courtyard of the main house

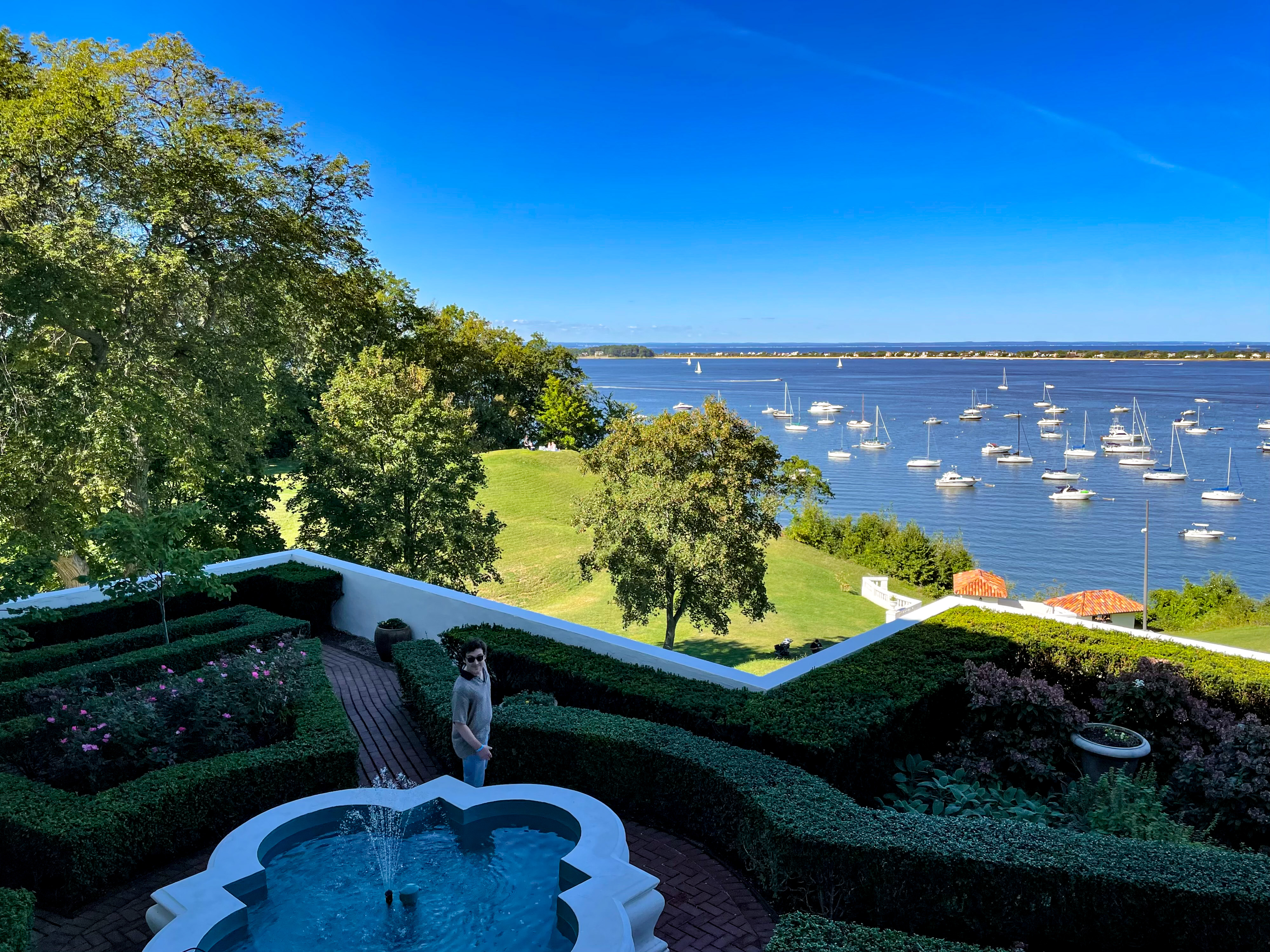
View of the grounds and Northport Bay from the main house
