= Camp Alvernia =

Coordinates: 40.8980°N 73.3724°W

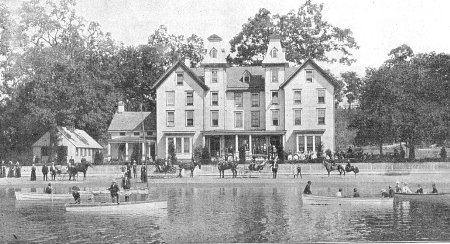
The former St Francis Monastery building at Camp Alvernia, in 1895.

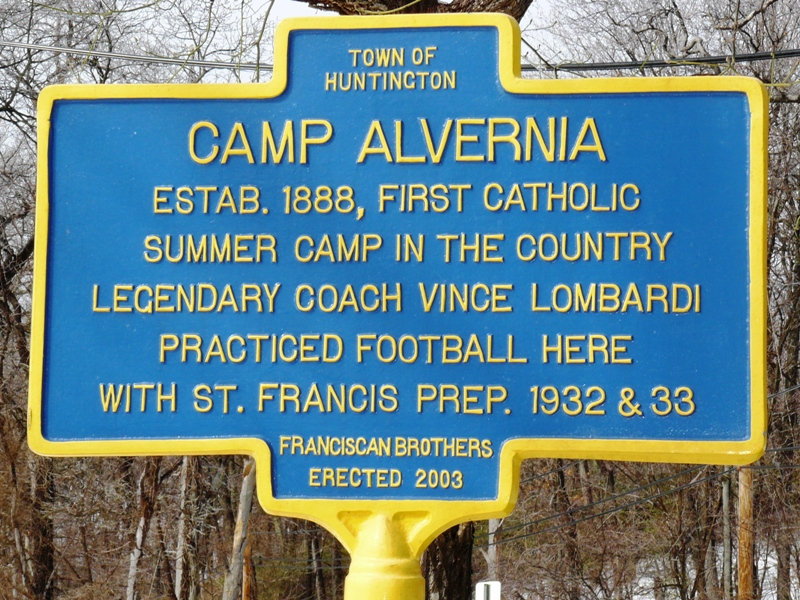
Historical marker outside Camp Alvernia with a tribute to Vince Lombardi.

Camp Alvernia is a non-profit recreational summer camp in Centerport, New York on the North Shore of Long Island. The camp is located on the east shore of Centerport Harbor, on the Little Neck peninsula. It was founded in 1888 by the Franciscan Brothers of Brooklyn, who still run the facility now, over 130 years later. Alvernia was the first and is now the oldest Catholic camp in continuous operation in the United States.

Camp Alvernia is currently a day camp that serves hundreds of children ages 3 to 14 from all religious backgrounds, and also continues to serve as a retreat for the Franciscan Brothers. The Camp offers boating and sailing activities, land and field activities, and swimming in four pools. Scholarships are also awarded each year to families in serious financial need.

== History ==
Originally built as a summer retreat for Franciscan brothers, it later became a residential camp for immigrant children living in New York City, who slept in tents until cabins were built in the 1930-40s. It was originally named "Mount Alvernia" after the mountain in Italy where Francis of Assisi is said to have received stigmata. Funding for the camp was raised by redeeming Kirkman Soap wrappers, each having a value of two cents.

Camp Alvernia was founded as a residential camp for boys. It was a co-ed sleep away and day camp as early as the 1980s. Girls traditionally stayed in the dorms attached to the main building, brother residences, and the dining hall; there was one room for younger girls, and one room for older girls. Boys stayed in traditional cabins with names such as Nest, Bayview, Shady Rest, and Seaside that were separated according to their age. There would be a weekly campfire for all sleep away residents. Weekends had offered lot more freedom in terms of activities. At the time of its 100th anniversary, it was still run as a simultaneous residential and day camp. Residential students would be awoken by a reveille over the campus wide loudspeaker, meet for breakfast, and then break into their day camp groups, as the day campers would be bused in from local Long Island towns in vans.

== Naming ==
Keeping with the camp's theme and location at the time, the day camp named its various age groups after tribes of the Iroquois nation. The youngest campers were called the Oneidas, followed by the Mohawk, Huron, Cayuga and the Seneca. The same names were used until 2021, although the age groups they refer to changed over the years. Cayugas were boys and girls who completed school pre-k and kindergarten prior to the start of camp, Oneidas were 1st and 2nd graders, Mohawks were 3rd and 4th graders, Hurons were 5th and 6th graders, and Senecas were 7th-9th graders. Historically children were also further separated within their group designation as girls groups and boys groups; throughout the day, there would be friendly competition within the designation Seneca Nation. Within each particular age group, campers would be assigned to a particular number within their group for instance there was Seneca Girls 1, Seneca Girls and 2, Seneca Girl, 3 a very detailed member of the administration team would assign a daily camp schedule for the day. The activities could include camper choice, soccer, tennis, boating, arts & crafts, dance, swimming, dodge ball, basketball, ping-pong, and for the little ones, many learned to swim for the first time at Camp Alvernia in addition to participation in age-appropriate aforementioned sports and age specific games like parachute, red rover, red-light green-light. In 2016, the camp began accepting three year olds in a new age group initially called the Pequots.

== Activities ==
Camp activities included traditional arts and crafts and swimming, but also had full basketball courts, tennis courts, beach volleyball, soccer, softball, and playing fields. Its specialty was boating, especially windsurfing. Campers would have boating, led by Brother Louie.

There were many options for campers. They could canoe, kayak (post 2000), windsurf, sail (sunfish boats) or go on the few larger sailboats for a sail ride. Before 2000, there would also be "field trips" excursions to the Commack roller skating rink, Vanderbilt the Museum in Centerport, the local arcade (on rainy days), and nearby beaches (Robert Moses for the older campers and Centerport for the younger campers). Another important nostalgic element of camp was the garage where campers could visit the canteen, and purchase candy soda, little favorites from pocket with the money parents might give them throughout the week.

Before 2000, and the loss of records in the 1990s, the Franciscan brothers were a collaborate but competitive athletic group of mentors. Camp Alvernia had a competitive softball team that traveled several times a summer to play against other camps. By 1990 the all-boy softball team recognized female talent and opened up participation up to a few female players. Counselors were charged with record keeping each day handing in the point sheets. Campers could earn additional points if their particular group won at an assigned activity, such as soccer over another group. For instance, Senaca Girls Group 1 VS. Senaca Girls Group 2. There was even a methodology set out to give points for ties. This point system bonded the individual groups even further as they learned to play fairly, work together, build character, and win and lose graciously. Campers could also earn individual additional points if they placed in the camp marathon or track and field races among all campers of their particular age and gender. All campers would earn participation points for participating.

At Friday award ceremonies, 1st to 4th place ribbons were given out for track and field events and the camper of the week in each group would be awarded a button and certificate. These points were cumulative over the course of the summer and impressively, year after year. There were milestones awards for points over cumulative years. The highest recognition of points would be 16,000 A's which would earn the camper a plaque, recognition at the awards ceremony.

Upon the conclusion of the summer there was excitement and anticipation building up to a full afternoon of awards to conclude the summer. There were awards for every area of camp activity specialty for boys and girls in every respective group from Mohawk all the way to Senaca in the form of a bronze, silver, or gold metal including an overall best female and best male trophy in that category named after a Franciscan Brother. The award recipient was decided upon by the counselors in those respective age groups based on performance throughout the summer. There were categories like boating, arts & crafts, soccer, softball, tennis, swimming, and track & field. The annual awards ceremony for decades ended with camper/athlete of the year, typically awarded to a Senaca the oldest group, someone who was enrolled in the last session of the camp, and typically was there all summer. These campers were nominated and voted on by all the counselors.

In the summer of 2000, Camp Alvernia developed a course called "Leadership Skills in Community Youth Recreation." The course was based in part on the camp's annual pre-camp orientation program, and participating camp counselors earn college credit. The Love of Learning Montessori method school moved to the grounds of Camp Alvernia in September 2004.

== Loss of records and recent events ==
In the 1990s, many of the camp's records were thrown out, having suffered water damage. In 2010, the camp began a concerted effort to reconnect with former campers and counselors.

In 2009, the camp built two new pools to provide additional space for recreational and instructional swim programs. The camp also conducts a greatly expanded boating program starting at age 3, with paddle boats, canoes, kayaks, stand up paddleboards (SUPs), and sailboats. The camp also offers a sailing certification program through US Sailing.

In 2021, the names for the age groups were changed to refer to local birds, particularly those who live on or near the shore. The three year olds and early four year olds were renamed Ducklings, pre-k and kindergarten were renamed Sandpipers, 1st and 2nd grade were renamed Plovers, 3rd and 4th grade were named Ospreys, 5th and 6th grade were named Herons, and 7th-9th grade were named Eagles.
