= Obadiah Smith House =

Historic house in New York, United States

- U.S. National Register of Historic Places
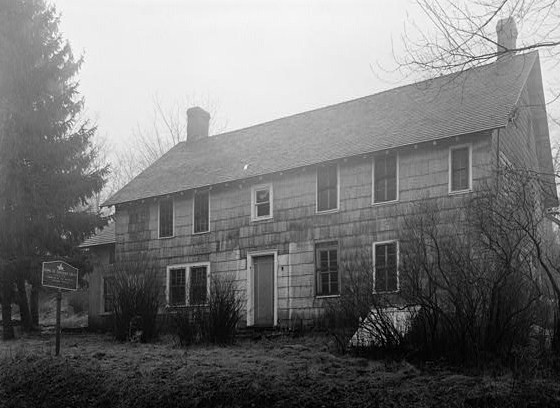
- Obadiah Smith House, 1963

- Location within New York Location within the United States
- Location: 853 Saint Johnland Road, Hamlet of San Remo, Kings Park, New York
- Coordinates: 40°53′38″N 73°13′47″W
- Area: 1.5 acres (0.61 ha)
- Built: c. 1708
- Architectural style: Colonial, Federal
- NRHP reference No.: 96001422
- Added to NRHP: December 6, 1996

Obadiah Smith House is a historic home located at Kings Park in Suffolk County, New York. It was built about 1708 and is a two-story, heavy timber frame, five-bay center entrance dwelling, with a side gable roof and interior end chimneys. It is operated as a house museum by the Smithtown Historical Society.

It was added to the National Register of Historic Places in 1996.
