= Henry Smith Farmstead =

Historic house in New York, United States

- U.S. National Register of Historic Places
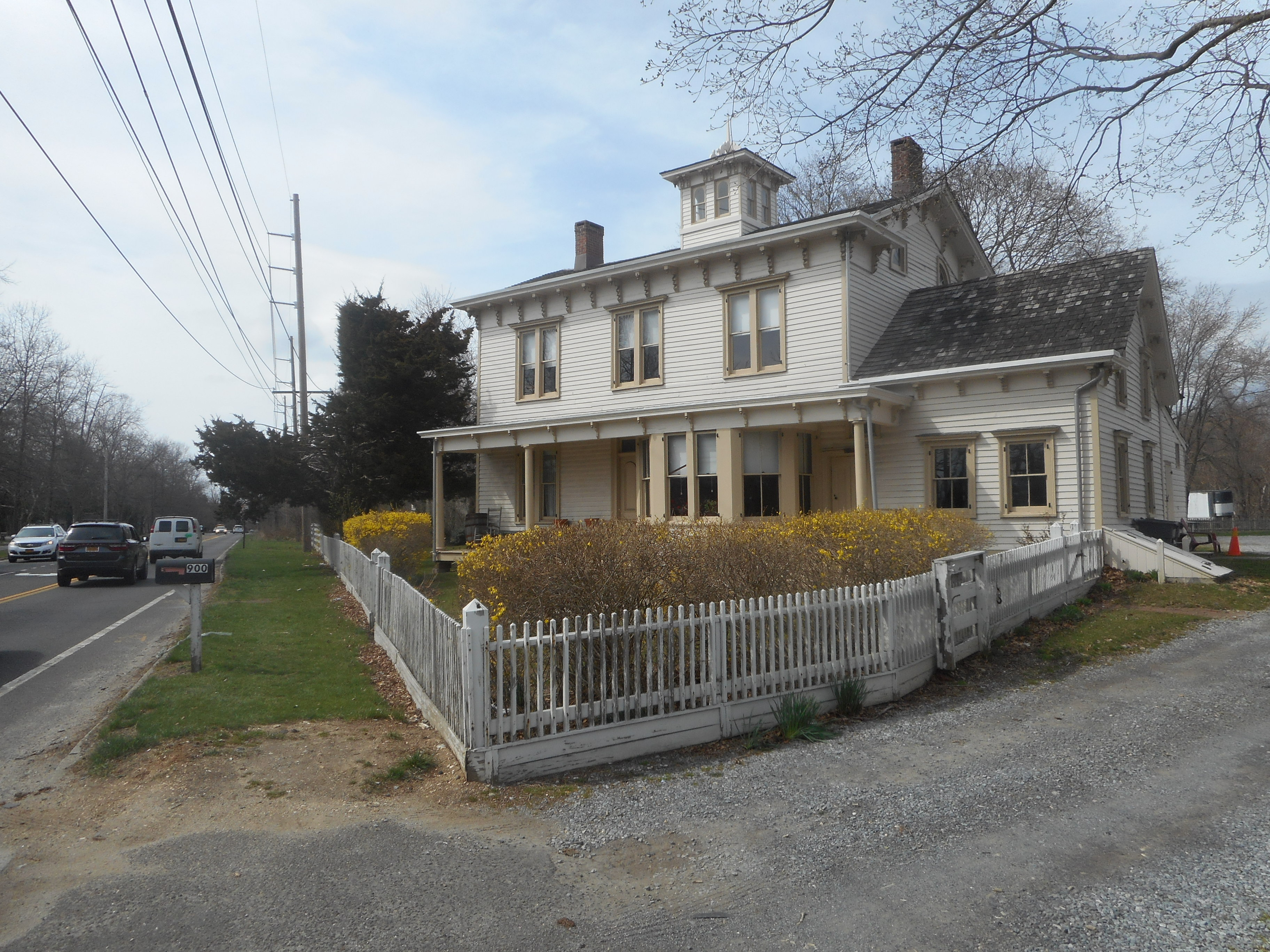
- The farmhouse of the Henry Smith Farmstead on Park Avenue and Little Plains Road.

- Location within New York Location within the United States
- Location: 900 Park Ave., Huntington Station, New York
- Coordinates: 40°51′3″N 73°22′48″W
- Area: 3 acres (1.2 ha)
- Built: 1750
- Architect: Smith, Henry
- MPS: Huntington Town MRA
- NRHP reference No.: 85002539
- Added to NRHP: September 26, 1985

Henry Smith Farmstead is a historic home located at Huntington Station in Suffolk County, New York. It is a 2-story, three-bay clapboard dwelling with a 1 1/2-story, three-bay south wing. It was built about 1750 and remodelled in the 1860s. Also on the property are a barn, privy, and three sheds.

It was added to the National Register of Historic Places in 1985.
