= Centerport, New York =

- Hamlet and census-designated place
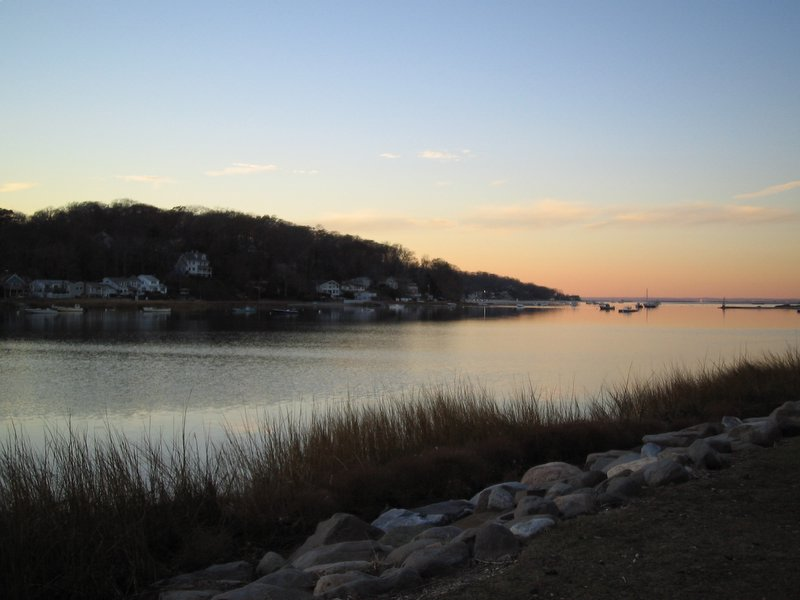
- Centerport Harbor, November 2005

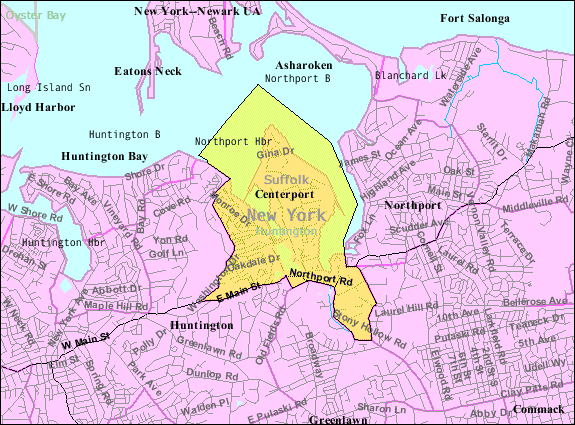
- U.S. Census map

- Location on Long Island Location within the state of New York
- Coordinates: 40°53′34″N 73°22′41″W
- Country: United States
- State: New York
- County: Suffolk
- Town: Huntington
- Named for: Its location within the Town of Huntington

Area
  - Total: 3.64 sq mi (9.44 km^{2})
  - Land: 2.21 sq mi (5.73 km^{2})
  - Water: 1.43 sq mi (3.71 km^{2})
- Elevation: 49 ft (15 m)

Population (2020)
  - Total: 5,822
  - Density: 2,632.4/sq mi (1,016.38/km^{2})
- Time zone: UTC-5 (Eastern (EST))
  - Summer (DST): UTC-4 (EDT)
- ZIP code: 11721
- Area codes: 631, 934
- FIPS code: 36-13442
- GNIS feature ID: 0946210

Centerport (historically known as Little Cow Harbor and Little Neck) is a hamlet and census-designated place (CDP) located within the Town of Huntington in Suffolk County, on the North Shore of Long Island, in New York, United States. The population was 5,822 at the time of the 2020 census.

== History ==
What is now Centerport was originally inhabited by Matinecock Native Americans. In the 17th century, European colonists – primarily English along with some Dutch – began to settle the area.

Suydam House, a saltbox house built in 1730, is one of the oldest surviving houses in Centerport.

Camp Alvernia in Centerport was the first Catholic summer camp in the United States, established in 1888. The camp remained in operation as of 2026, serving over 900 local children aged 3–14 each summer.

During the Gold Coast era, numerous wealthy individuals constructed large country estates in Centerport. Among the best-known examples of such estates in Centerport is the estate of William Kissam Vanderbilt II, known as Eagle's Nest; it is now the Vanderbilt Museum and Planetarium.

In 1931, the portion of Centerport known as Little Neck proposed incorporating as a village; the proposed village was to be known as the Incorporated Village of Center Neck. The territory would have included several large estates – including the Vanderbilt estate. The proposal was defeated by residents of the proposed territory on October 24, 1931, by a vote of 49-to-40; many residents who opposed the plan feared that the proposed incorporation was an attempt by the community's large estate owners to more tightly regulate their properties and the local beaches for themselves. Accordingly, all of Centerport would remain an unincorporated hamlet within – and governed by – the Town of Huntington. The defeat of the incorporation proposal was met with a parade and celebration by opponents.

=== Etymology ===
Formerly known as Little Cow Harbor in about 1700, as Centreport by 1836, and as Centerport after 1895, the community's name refers to its geographic position along the water, midway between the east and west boundaries of the Town of Huntington. The portion of the community known as Little Neck refers to its geographic location on the Little (Centerport) Neck. This peninsula's name, in turn, is derived from being the smaller of two adjacent "necks" – the other being known as Great (Northport) Neck.

== Geography ==
According to the United States Census Bureau, the CDP has a total area of 2.3 square miles (6.0 km^{2}), of which 2.1 square miles (5.5 km^{2}) is land and 0.19 square miles (0.5 km^{2}), or 8.29%, is water.

Centerport is highly residential, characterized by winding roads and beachfront hills.

== Demographics ==
Historical population
Census	Pop.	Note	%±
2000	5,446		—
2010	5,508		1.1%
2020	5,822		5.7%
U.S. Decennial Census

=== 2020 census ===
As of the 2020 census, Centerport had a population of 5,822. The median age was 49.0 years. 19.7% of residents were under the age of 18 and 20.6% of residents were 65 years of age or older. For every 100 females there were 93.8 males, and for every 100 females age 18 and over there were 91.8 males age 18 and over.

100.0% of residents lived in urban areas, while 0.0% lived in rural areas.

There were 2,171 households in Centerport, of which 30.1% had children under the age of 18 living in them. Of all households, 62.7% were married-couple households, 11.4% were households with a male householder and no spouse or partner present, and 20.8% were households with a female householder and no spouse or partner present. About 18.8% of all households were made up of individuals and 11.0% had someone living alone who was 65 years of age or older.

There were 2,272 housing units, of which 4.4% were vacant. The homeowner vacancy rate was 1.0% and the rental vacancy rate was 6.6%.

Racial composition as of the 2020 census
Race	Number	Percent
White	5,248	90.1%
Black or African American	23	0.4%
American Indian and Alaska Native	2	0.0%
Asian	108	1.9%
Native Hawaiian and Other Pacific Islander	1	0.0%
Some other race	93	1.6%
Two or more races	347	6.0%
Hispanic or Latino (of any race)	306	5.3%

=== 2000 census ===
As of the 2000 census, there were 5,446 people, 2,022 households, and 1,526 families residing in the CDP. The population density was 2,562.0 inhabitants per square mile (989.2/km^{2}). There were 2,094 housing units at an average density of 985.1 per square mile (380.3/km^{2}). The racial makeup of the CDP was 97.65% White, 0.22% African American, 0.11% Native American, 1.18% Asian, 0.31% from other races, and 0.53% from two or more races. Hispanic or Latino of any race were 2.15% of the population.

There were 2,022 households, out of which 34.9% had children under the age of 18 living with them, 65.9% were married couples living together, 7.4% had a female householder with no husband present, and 24.5% were non-families. 18.3% of all households were made up of individuals, and 6.8% had someone living alone who was 65 years of age or older. The average household size was 2.68 and the average family size was 3.07.

In the CDP, the population was spread out, with 25.0% under the age of 18, 3.9% from 18 to 24, 30.8% from 25 to 44, 27.8% from 45 to 64, and 12.4% who were 65 years of age or older. The median age was 40 years. For every 100 females, there were 94.3 males. For every 100 females age 18 and over, there were 94.3 males.

In 2000, the median income for a household in the CDP was $160,456, and the median income for a family was $194,908. Males had a median income of over $100,000 versus $54,706 for females. The per capita income for the CDP was $71,763. About 1.6% of families and 2.9% of the population were below the poverty line, including 2.5% of those under age 18 and 9.2% of those aged 65 or over.

=== Demographic estimates ===
The median household income estimate between 2014 and 2018, in 2018 dollars, was $145,722.

== Education ==
Centerport is located within the boundaries of (and is thus served by) the Harborfields Central School District. The schools include Harborfields High School, Oldfield Middle School, T.J. Lahey Elementary School, and Washington Drive Primary School. In the past, the district has received Blue Ribbon awards of excellence.

== Arts and culture ==
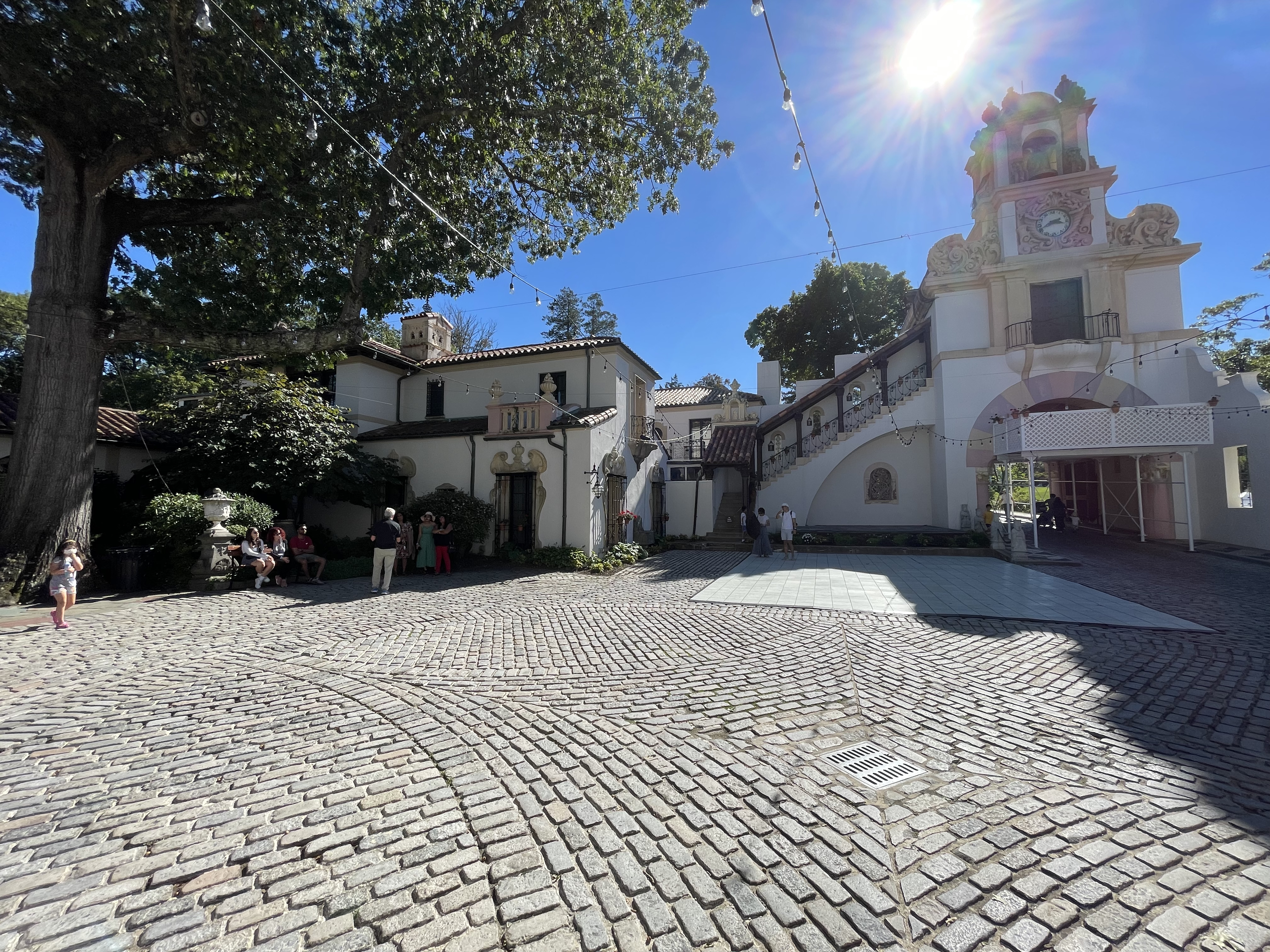
Eagle's Nest – now the Vanderbilt Museum and Planetarium – in 2021

Centerport is the site of the estate and Eagle's Nest mansion of William Kissam Vanderbilt II. This 43-acre (170,000 m^{2}) estate now contains the Vanderbilt Museum and Planetarium.

=== Boating ===
As is common among the many beachfront locations on Long Island's North Shore, Centerport has developed a large boating and sailing culture. An important part of this culture is the Centerport Yacht Club, which was founded in 1947 and has served as the social and athletic focal point for the boating community in both Centerport and its surrounding areas. The yacht club sponsors a variety of racing fleets and regattas every year generally beginning in the late spring and ending mid-autumn.

== Notable people ==
- Arthur Dove – Artist.
- Buzz Feiten – Musician.
- Gregg Hughes – Radio personality.
- Robert J. Mrazek – Author, filmmaker, and politician; former member of the United States House of Representatives for New York's 3rd congressional district.
- John J. Robinson – Lawyer and politician.
- Sergei Rachmaninoff – Russian composer; spent two summers residing in Centerport.
- William Kissam Vanderbilt II – Racing driver and member of the Vanderbilt family.

== In popular culture ==
- In the Marvel Comics universe, Angel – a member of the X-Men – was born in Centerport.

== See also ==
- Camp Alvernia
- Mill Dam Bridge
