= Deer Park Airport =

Deer Park Airport may refer to:

- Deer Park Airport (New York), in Deer Park, New York
- Deer Park Airport (Washington), in Deer Park, Washington
