= Ray Searage =

American baseball player and coach (born 1955)

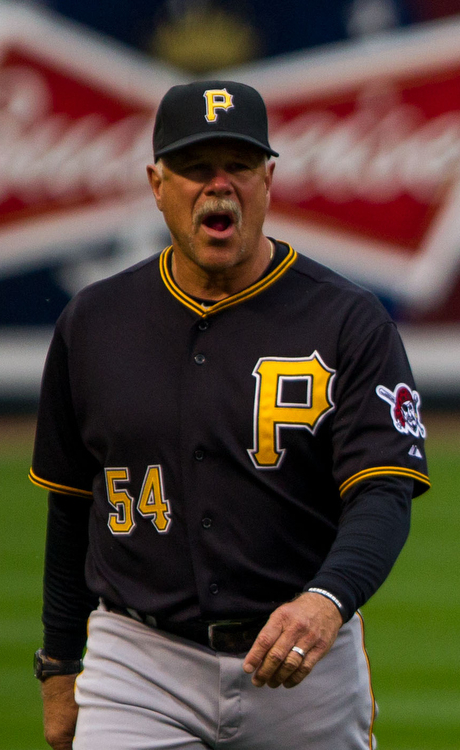
- Searage with the Pittsburgh Pirates in 2012
- Pitcher
- Born: May 1, 1955 (age 70); Freeport, New York, U.S.
- Batted: Left Threw: Left

MLB debut
- June 11, 1981, for the New York Mets

Last MLB appearance
- September 30, 1990, for the Los Angeles Dodgers

MLB statistics
- Win–loss record: 11–13
- Earned run average: 3.50
- Strikeouts: 193
- Stats at Baseball Reference

Teams
- As player: New York Mets (1981); Milwaukee Brewers (1984–1986); Chicago White Sox (1986–1987); Los Angeles Dodgers (1989–1990); As coach: Pittsburgh Pirates (2010–2019)

Raymond Mark Searage (born May 1, 1955) is an American former professional baseball relief pitcher and coach. Searage played in Major League Baseball (MLB) for the New York Mets (1981), Milwaukee Brewers (1984–1986), Chicago White Sox (1986–1987), and Los Angeles Dodgers (1989–1990). He was also the pitching coach for the Pittsburgh Pirates from 2010 through 2019.

== Playing career ==
Searage is from Deer Park, New York. He graduated from Deer Park High School in 1973, and then attended Suffolk Community College for one year, before he transferred to West Liberty State College, where he played college baseball for the West Liberty Hilltoppers in the National Association of Intercollegiate Athletics.

The St. Louis Cardinals selected Searage in the 22nd round of the 1976 Major League Baseball draft. In December 1979, the Cardinals traded Searage to the New York Mets for Jody Davis. He made his MLB debut with the Mets on June 11, 1981, just hours before the start of the 1981 MLB strike. In his brief tenure with the Mets in 1981, he had a 1–0 win–loss record and a 3.65 earned run average across 26 games played. He also went 1-for-1 in his only at bat, making him the only Met in history to have a 100% winning percentage and a 1.000 batting average.

In January 1982, the Mets traded Searage to the Cleveland Indians for Tom Veryzer. He spent two years in the minor leagues for the Cleveland organization before he signed with the Milwaukee Brewers after the 1983 season.

While with the Brewers, Searage had a streak of 28 consecutive scoreless innings pitched from 1984 to 1985, which tied a team record. He struggled in 1985, and was demoted to the minor leagues on June 14. The Brewers recalled him in August. He began the 1986 season with Milwaukee, but again struggled and was sent to the minor leagues, before being recalled in June. In July 1986, the Brewers traded Searage to the Chicago White Sox for Al Jones and Tom Hartley. Searage signed with the Los Angeles Dodgers in April 1988. After spending the 1988 season in the minor leagues, he made the Dodgers' major league team in 1989. After pitching for the Dodgers in 1990, Searage finished his playing career with the Scranton/Wilkes-Barre Red Barons in 1991 and the Edmonton Trappers in 1992.

In seven major league seasons, Searage had an 11–13 win–loss record with a 3.50 ERA. He appeared in 254 games, pitched 287 2/3 innings, finished 101 games, and garnered 11 saves. Searage allowed 267 hits, 120 runs, 112 earned runs, 22 home runs, 137 walks (23 intentional), 193 strikeouts, hit three batters, made 14 wild pitches, faced 1,242 batters, and balked twice.

== Coaching career ==
In 1994, Searage rejoined the Cardinals' organization as a minor league pitching coach, assigned to the Madison Hatters of the Class A Midwest League. He coached the Peoria Chiefs of the Midwest League in 1995 and 1996 and the Prince William Cannons of the Class A-Advanced Carolina League in 1997. Searage worked for the Tampa Bay Devil Rays organization as the pitching coach for the Orlando Rays of the Class AA Southern League from 1998 through 2000. The Florida Marlins hired Searage as their minor league pitching coordinator in 2000. In 2001, he served as interim pitching coach for the Calgary Cannons of the Class AAA Pacific Coast League, substituting for Britt Burns. He joined the Pittsburgh Pirates organization, and served as the pitching coach for the Williamsport Crosscutters of the Class A-Short Season New York-Penn League in 2003 and 2004, the Hickory Crawdads of the Class A South Atlantic League in 2005, the Altoona Curve of the Class AA Eastern League in 2006 and 2007, and for the Indianapolis Indians of the Class AAA International League in 2008 and 2009.

On October 17, 2009, he was promoted to the Pittsburgh Pirates as the assistant pitching coach. When John Russell, the manager of the Pirates, initiated the firing of Joe Kerrigan, the Pirates' pitching coach, in August 2010, Searage was named interim pitching coach for the Pirates. After Clint Hurdle was named manager, Searage was named full-time pitching coach. In 2015, the Pirates had 98 wins and a 3.21 team ERA, both second-best in MLB. As the Pirates' pitching coach, Searage was credited with rejuvenating the careers of Francisco Liriano, Edinson Vólquez, Charlie Morton, J. A. Happ, and A. J. Burnett. He held that position until October 3, 2019, when he was dismissed shortly after Hurdle.

== Personal life ==
Searage has three sons. His son Ryan played professional baseball for the Pirates organization.

Sporting positions
Preceded by Joe Kerrigan	Pittsburgh Pirates pitching coach August 8, 2010–2019	Succeeded by Oscar Marin
