= LICC =

LICC may refer to:

- Long Island Council of Churches, a not-for-profit organization in Long Island, New York
- LICC, the ICAO code for Catania–Fontanarossa Airport, Catania, Italy

== See also ==
- The Lick, a musical phrase popular in jazz often spelled as the licc when referred to in Internet memes.
