= Deer Park High School (New York) =

Location
- 1 Falcon Place; Deer Park, New York 11729; United States
- Coordinates: 40.763582°N 73.333875°W

Information
- School type: Public, High School
- Established: 1959-1961
- Status: Open
- School district: Deer Park School Union Free School District
- Principal: Charles Cobb
- Grades: 9–12
- Gender: Coed
- Age range: 14–18
- Enrollment: 1,326 (2024-2025)
- Average class size: 26.2
- Campus type: Suburban
- Colors: Maroon, Gray, and White
- Slogan: "Home of the Falcons"
- Mascot: Falcon
- Team name: Falcons
- Feeder schools: Robert Frost Middle School
- Website: Deer Park High School

Deer Park High School is a public high school in the town of Deer Park in suburban Long Island, New York. It is the only high school in the Deer Park School Union Free School District and serves students in grades 9–12.

== Academics ==
In 2008, the school exceeded the state average passing rate in all nine of the New York State Regents Examinations test areas and students took AP examinations in 16 test areas. The school's 14.9 student-teacher ratio exceeds the 12.8 state average.

== Notable alumni ==
- Bob McCurdy – college basketball player, Class of 1970
- Ray Searage, baseball player and coach, Class of 1973
- Paul Becker, Naval Intelligence Officer and Director for Intelligence of The Joint Chiefs of Staff, Class of 1979
- Joe Valentine – baseball player, Class of 1997
- Kathleen Herles – voice actress, original voice of Dora on Dora the Explorer, Class of 2008
- Linda Yaccarino, CEO X Corp
- The Chiodo Brothers, Charles Chiodo, Production Designer, Class of 1970, Stephen Chiodo, Director, Class of 1972, Edward Chiodo, Producer, Class of 1978, Chiodo Bros. Productions, Inc., Killer Klowns from Outer Space, Elf, Team America: World Police, Alien Xmas, Marcel the Shell With Shoes On

== Feeder patterns ==
Students enter the school after completing eighth grade at Robert Frost Middle School, the only middle school in the district.
