= Deer Park School District =

Deer Park School District may refer to:

- Deer Park School District (New York)
- Deer Park School District (Washington)
- Deer Park Independent School District (Texas)
