= Professional Medical Film =

Film series

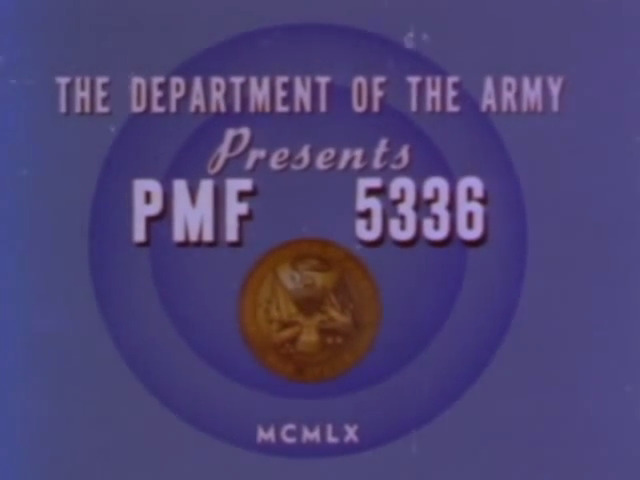
Title card for PMF 5336, a 33-minute film entitled Rehabilitation of Bilateral Amputee, Exercises: Fitting of and Training with Prostheses (1960).

The Professional Medical Film (PMF) series was a series of technical motion pictures produced by the U.S. Army from the mid-1940s through the late 1960s. The series covered psychiatric, surgical, and tropical medicine, radiation health effects, and other health topics in an American military medicine context. The intended audience was professional, active duty health care providers.

== List of films ==
- PMF 5000 (1947) - Preparation and Staining of Blood Slides, demonstration of laboratory equipment; preparation of stains; preparation of thick films for diagnosis of malaria (18 min; color).
- PMF 5001 (1947) - Colostomy Closure (End-to-End Anastomosis), surgical repair of left upper abdominal colostomy (13 min).
- PMF 5002 (1947) - Abdominal Colostomy Closure — Pauchet Method, case of well-functioning colostomy of double loop type located on left side in sigmoid colon; method used to accomplish closure; precautions (9 min; color).
- PMF 5003 -
- PMF 5004 (1947) - Intra-Abdominal Closure Descending Colon Colostomy (Herniations and Multiple Openings), colostomy of descending colon midway between umbilicus and anterior iliac crest with four separate openings resulting from damage to exteriorized loop of bowel; technique used to effect repair (15 min; color).
- PMF 5005 (1947) - Simple Closure of an Abdominal Colostomy, incomplete colostomy of transverse colon; relatively simple closure procedure; advantages of intraperitoneal approach (7 min; color).
- PMF 5006 -
- PMF 5007 (1947) - Intra-Abdominal Colostomy Closures (Right and Left Side), series of right sided colostomy cases; factors essential to adequate closure (9 min; color).
- PMF 5008 (1947) - Management of Abdominal Colostomies (Intraperitoneal Closure), experience record of cases encountered during WW II; factors essential to evaluation of each type; methods of approach (22 min; color).
- PMF 5009 (1947) - Operation for Varicocele, case of painful left varicocele involving anterior group of veins; surgical treatment similar in principle to ligation of saphenous vein for varicosities of lower extremity; technique (5 min; color).
- PMF 5010 - Amputation of Lower Extremity
- PMF 5011 (1945) – Psychiatry for the General Medical Officer, originally developed by the British and redeveloped by the U.S. Army.
- PMF 5012 (1945) – Combat Exhaustion, developed in the 312th Station Hospital in England by Col. Lloyd J. Thompson, MC, Col. Ernest H. Parsons, MC, and Maj. Howard D. Fabing, MC.
- PMF 5013 -
- PMF 5014 -
- PMF 5015 (1946) - Convalescent Care and Rehabilitation of Patients with Injury to Spinal Cord (Surgery and Physical Medicine), Diagnostic, surgical, nursing, and physical medicine techniques and practices (41 min; color).
- PMF 5016 (1946) - Thoracic Surgery — Part I: Hemothorax with Consideration of Specific Remedial Breathing Exercises (Surgery and Physical Medicine), Pathologic, diagnostic, and therapeutic aspects of hemothorax and other disorders of the pleura and pleural cavity (39 min; color).
- PMF 5017 -
- PMF 5018 - Thoracic Surgery — Part III: Foreign Bodies in the Pericardium and Heart, Diagnostic planning, surgical, and postoperative techniques (50 min; color).
- PMF 5019 (1946; unreleased until 1981) – Let There Be Light (58 min; b&w); Maj. John Huston's classic documentary on military neuropsychiatry; developed at Mason General Hospital; use of narcosynthesis, hypnosis, and group psychotherapy; Walter Huston narrates. In 1948, this film was remade with professional actors and retitled Shades of Gray (PMF 5047).
- PMF 5020 (1946) - Removal of Magnetic Foreign Bodies from the Eye, acceptable technique; handling of detached retina case (14 min; color).
- PMF 5021 -
- PMF 5022 -
- PMF 5023 -
- PMF 5024 - Amputation Prostheses and Their Uses, Part I: Upper Extremity
- PMF 5025 -
- PMF 5026 - Complicated Amputations: Case Reports
- PMF 5027 (1947) – Schistosomiasis, three types of schistosomiasis (snail fever); Geographical habitat, epidemiology, symptomatology, and general control measures; technical, clinical, and laboratory procedures for diagnosis and treatment of Schistosomiasis japonica (27 min; color).
- PMF 5028 (1947) - Sandfly Control, symptoms, methods, and treatment of skin diseases transmitted by sandfly; environmental sanitation principles essential to control (33 min; color).
- PMF 5030 (1946) - The Preparation and Insertion of Tantalum Plate (Cranium Insert), preliminaries essential to preparation and placement of tantalum plate; individual cases; salient operational features (30 min; color).
- PMF 5031 (1946) - Below Knee Amputation, Amputation method useful immediately after injury and in secondary repair of stump (14 min; color).
- PMF 5032 -
- PMF 5033 (1946) - Technique of Open Amputation, Procedure on below knee open amputation case; revision and final plastic repair performed six weeks later; through explanation of each specific step throughout two operations (11 min; color).
- PMF 5034 (1947) - Therapeutic Exercise, Introduction, Use of planned therapeutic physical movement for specific purpose (17 min).
- PMF 5035 -
- PMF 5036 -
- PMF 5037 (1947) - Abnormal Involuntary Movements, Activating and inhibitory influences on motor centers at various levels of nervous system; involuntary movement caused by losing control of ability to relax after certain types of lesions (24 min).
- PMF 5038 -
- PMF 5039 (1947) - Disorders of Gait, Coordination of motor power; motor power from muscles controlled by peripheral nerves originating in spinal cord; motor impulses from brain through pyramidal tract (27 min).
- PMF 5040 -
- PMF 5041 -
- PMF 5042 -
- PMF 5043 -
- PMF 5044 (1947) - Facial Palsy, Anatomy of facial nerve; detailed description of course of upper and lower neuron; results of lesions in some characteristic sites; treatment of facial palsy; spasm during regeneration of facial palsy differentiated from tic twitchings of other etiology (22 min).
- PMF 5045 -
- PMF 5046 -
- PMF 5047 (1948) – Shades of Gray (65 min, 51 sec); summary of experience in prevention and treatment of neuropsychiatric cases in WW II; mental disorders which may be experienced during training and combat; mild anxiety states; obsessive-compulsive neuroses; psychosomatic disorders; severe depressive reactions; paranoid psychoses (partly a re-dramatized version of U.S. Army Film Bulletin FB #184 ["Psychiatric Procedures in the Combat Area"], partly a remake [with actors] of PMF 5019).
- PMF 5048 (1947) - Arthropod-Borne Virus Encephalitides; Differential diagnostic measures; diagnosis, treatment, and control of Japanese B encephalitis; proper approach to investigation of problem (34 min).
- PMF 5049 -
- PMF 5050 -
- PMF 5051 (1947) - Therapeutic Exercise, Orthopedics (28 min).
- PMF 5052 (1947) - To Hear Again; General principles of rehabilitation for patients with impaired hearing (38 min; Film Reference).
- PMF 5053 (1947) - Therapeutic Exercise, Peripheral Nerve Injuries (16 min).
- PMF 5054 -
- PMF 5055 - Toward Independence
- PMF 5056 (1947) - Therapeutic Exercise, Thoracic Surgery; Physical examination; determining specific remedial activity; characteristic deformities; preoperative exercises; general surgical aspects; postoperative treatment routine; coughing; posture; progressive stages of exercises; heat and ultraviolet; measurements of range of motion; overcoming a definite weakness or loss of function; heavy resistance phase (29 min).
- PMF 5057 -
- PMF 5058 (1950) - The Medical Effects of the Atomic Bomb: Part 1, Physics, Physical Destruction, Casualty Effects; Nuclear fission and general reaction; thermal energy and mechanical force; nuclear radiation and ionizing effect; physical destruction; casualty effects (32 min; color).
- PMF 5059 - Dynamic Physical Reconditioning
- PMF 5060 -
- PMF 5061 (1947) - Peripheral Nerve Surgery — Part I: Sciatic Nerve; Management of typical peripheral nerve injury case of WW II; follow-up treatment at neurosurgical centers of the Veterans Administration (33 min; color).
- PMF 5062 (1947) - Cineplastic Operation; Attaching cords to selected muscle and then to prosthetic appliance so that patient can operate appliance by contracting muscles in amputation stub (18 min; color).
- PMF 5063 (1946) - Anterior Acrylic Bridgework; Fitting dental bridges in which acrylic is used to replace porcelain; procedures and techniques (39 min; color; from Navy Film MN 4352A, B, and C).
- PMF 5064 -
- PMF 5065 (1947) - Management and Technique of Pulmonary Lobectomy; Bronchiectasis of left lower lobe of lungs; extirpation of diseased lung tissue (31 min; color).
- PMF 5066 -
- PMF 5067 -
- PMF 5068 (1947) - Repair of Recto-Urethral Fistula; Case of injury to large and small bowel, bladder, urethra, and rectum caused by bullet wounds; exploratory laparotomy scar, cystostomy, colostomy, and abdominal fistula wounds; closure of complete fistula by use of Whitehead principle of advancement of rectum (3 min; color).
- PMF 5069 (1947) - Simple Anterior Closure of Transverse Colostomy (Right Side); Right side colostomies less frequent than left side colostomies; similarity of procedures followed in anastomosis; typical problems and applicable surgical techniques; some WW II developments in surgical management of colostomies (23 min; color).
- PMF 5070 (1947) - Simple Anterior Closure of Colostomy (10 min; color).
- PMF 5071 (1948) - Pinta; Various stages of chronic, disfiguring skin disease; diagnosis; spirochetal etiology; good results with arsenical and penicillin therapy (18 min; color).
- PMF 5072 - Physical Medicine Service
- PMF 5073 (1947) - Construction of Screw Lock Sectional Splint; Case of facial injury including fracture of mandible, comminuted, compound, requiring additional bone to restore contour of mandible; all phases of fixation, grafting, and replacement (17 min; color).
- PMF 5074 -
- PMF 5075 (1947) - Reconstruction of the Lower Lip and Chin; Case of destruction by shell fragments of two-thirds of lower lip, chin, and mandible; method and phases of restoration (20 min; color).
- PMF 5076 (1948) - Lumbar Sympathectomy (Ganglionectomy); Various applications; types of conditions likely to be benefited; procainization of structure to be removed; operative procedure; details of removal of sympathetic chain; anatomic and physiologic defects produced by removal of certain portions of chain; ordinary anatomic demonstration on cadaver (33 min; color; Film Reference).
- PMF 5077 - Inside the Cell (Two parts)
  - PMF 5077A 1, 2, 3 (1949) - Inside the Cell, Part I: Enzymes in Intracellular Chemistry; Concept of intracellular enzymatic action; biochemical phenomena illustrated by animation; laboratory technique of several Nobel prize winning scientists (40 min; color).
  - PMF 5077B 1, 2, 3 (1952) - Inside the Cell, Part II: Regulation of Enzymes; Factors regulating enzyme action (43 min; color).
- PMF 5078 -
- PMF 5079 -
- PMF 5080 -
- PMF 5081 (1948) - Transplantation and Anastomosis of Radial Nerve; Case of severed left radial nerve which was sutured but recovery failed to ensure; clinical findings; technique used to accomplish repair (9 min; color).
- PMF 5082 -
- PMF 5087 -
- PMF 5088 (1948) - Peroneal Nerve Anastomosis at the Knee; Case of peroneal nerve severed at bend of knee with evident foot drop and loss of sensation on dorsum of foot; technique used to effect repair; necessity for gently curving incision to prevent later keloid formation or contracture by avoiding flexion creases in popliteal space (7 min; color).
- PMF 5089 -
- PMF 5095 -
- PMF 5096 (1948) - Neurorrhaphy of Median and Ulnar Nerves in the Left Forearm; Left forearm shell fragment case with severed median and ulnar nerves; complete clinical examination details; procedure to accomplish repair (14 min; color).
- PMF 5097 (1948) - Technique of Tantalum Cranioplasty; Typical problems in cosmetic correction of skull defects by means of tantalum cranioplasty; technique of formation and insertion of tantalum plates (40 min; color).
- PMF 5098 -
- PMF 5099 -
- PMF 5100 -
- PMF 5101 -
- PMF 5102 (1948) - Neurorrhaphy of Median and Ulnar Nerves in Midarm; Detailed preoperative evaluation of damage to right midarm traversed by bullet; surgical repair of median and ulnar nerves (12 min; color).
- PMF 5103 (1950) - Arterial Disorders in the Upper Extremity and Their Treatment by Sympathectomy; Indications, clinical factors, operative treatment, and precautions (30 min; color).
- PMF 5104 (1946) - Partial Neurorrhaphy of the Sciatic Nerve in the Buttock; Injury to peroneal component of sciatic nerve resulting from bullet wound; precautions and precision essential to proper surgical management (12 min; color).
- PMF 5105 -
- PMF 5106 -
- PMF 5107 -
- PMF 5108 -
- PMF 5109 -
- PMF 5110 (1949) - Radioactivity — Laboratory Demonstrations; Elementary principles of radioactivity; instruments used in the laboratory for detection and counting (17 min; color).
- PMF 5111 (1949) - Cushing's Experiment in the Dog; Essential details; respiratory and circulatory effects of pressure on the brain, such as that resulting from brain tumors (14 min; color).
- PMF 5112 (1949) - Respiratory Reflexes Demonstrated in the Rabbit; Some of the simpler respiratory reflexes and their pathways (13 min; color).
- PMF 5113 -
- PMF 5114 (1949) - Rickettsiae — Laboratory Procedure for Their Isolation and Identification; For students taking basic science course; step-by-step technique of laboratory diagnosis of rickettsial disease; gross pathology compared with normal; fundamentals of sterile technique (47 min; color).
- PMF 5115 -
- PMF 5116 - Occupational Therapy (Three parts)
  - PMF 5116A (1949) - Time Out: Occupational Therapy in Tuberculosis; Usefulness of occupational therapy for patient's morale and rehabilitation; for orientation of patients, hospital personnel, and nonprofessional adult groups (26 min).
  - PMF 5116B (1950) - Occupational Therapy in Problems of Motion; Conditions involving joint limitation, muscle weakness, and incoordination; occupational therapy contributing to restoration of function (23 min).
  - PMF 5116C (1950) - Journey to Reality: Occupational Therapy for Acute Psychotics; Six patients with typical psychotic reactions at time of admission to hospital; histories; occupational therapy treatment; medical officer's responsibility for prescribing and guiding therapy; introduction to simple occupational therapy procedures (40 min).
- PMF 5117 (1949) - Tibial Nerve Anastomosis in the Lower Calf; Tibial nerve damage resulting from missile that traverses midcalf region, leaving plantar muscle paralyzed and sole of foot anesthetic; technique of surgical repair; anatomical considerations; precautions and physiotherapy (8 min; color).
- PMF 5118 (1949) - The Diagnosis of Peripheral Nerve Injuries; Significant clinical findings of 12 cases of various nerve injuries (16 min; color).
- PMF 5119 -
- PMF 5120 -
- PMF 5121 -
- PMF 5122 -
- PMF 5123 -
- PMF 5124 (1949) - Ascariasis (Infestation with Ascarids); Details of life cycle of ascarids in swine; reference to many other species (13 min).
- PMF 5125 -
- PMF 5131 -
- PMF 5132 (1949) - Method of Repair of Posterior Tibial Nerve; Repairing long defects in peripheral nerve; bridging large gap in tibial nerve by wide dissection and flexion of knee joint (10 min; color; Film Reference).
- PMF 5133 (1950) - Ulnar Nerve and Soft Tissue Defect and Simultaneous Repair in the Forearm; Method of accomplishing simultaneous repair of soft tissue defect and ulnar nerve defect in forearm (10 min; color).
- PMF 5134 -
- PMF 5135 -
- PMF 5136 (1950) - Benign Dental Tumors; Histories, diagnoses, characteristics, treatments, and results of cases of benign dental tumors (29 min; color).
- PMF 5137 (1950) - Malignant Oral Tumors; Lesions which occur in oral cavity and adjacent structures (40 min; color).
- PMF 5038 -
- PMF 5039 -
- PMF 5140 (1949) - Hereditary Ataxia; Hereditary and clinical characteristics of this group of neurological disorders; earliest and most common complaint; later disease development; signs of late stages; diagnoses (31 min; color).
- PMF 5141 (1951) - The Feeling of Rejection; Case history of 23-year-old girl suffering from physical disorders without physical cause; treatment by psychiatrist establishes root of trouble; understanding problem, patient handles it in manner leading to new and healthier habits of behavior (21 min).
- PMF 5142 (1951) - The Feeling of Hostility; Factors that produce feelings of resentment and hostility in personal relationships (31 min).
- PMF 5143 (1949) - Atomic Medical Cases— Japan; WW II documentary evidence of medical problems resulting from atomic explosions at Hiroshima and Nagasaki; pathological specimens shown in microscopic section; use of remaining doctors and nurses to greatest advantage in carrying out first aid and medical service (37 min; Offered, then withdrawn from sale through United World Films, Inc.).
- PMF 5144 (1952) - Nursing in the Tropics; Intended for nurses, doctors, and other hospital personnel; realistic problems incident to living and working in a military hospital in the tropics; problems of preventive medicine and aseptic techniques considered; special emphasis placed on nursing procedures involved in treating gastrointestinal disorders, fungus infections, malaria, and dengue fever (29 min).
- PMF 5145 (1951–54) - The Radioisotope, Parts I - VI
  - PMF 5145A (1951) - The Radioisotope — Part I: Fundamentals of Radioactivity; This introduction to the series dealing with the theoretical and practical aspects of the radioisotopes is designed for doctors, medical researchers, pharmacologists, toxicologists, enzymologists, physicists, chemists, physiologists, agronomists, soil chemists, radiologists, entomologists, engineers, plant managers, metallurgists, and health physicists; Part I establishes the basic concepts in the field of nuclear physics that are pertinent to an understanding of radioisotopes (59 min).
  - PMF 5145B (1952) - The Radioisotope — Part II: Properties of Radiation; This film (1) explains the characteristics and properties of primary and secondary nuclear radiations in terms of their ionizing effect, (2) introduces concepts concerning the effect of matter on radiation so that absorbing materials can be used widely to measure radiation characteristics or to shield against their biological effects, (3) acquaints the audience with the terminology and presentation of data as a prerequisite to practical measurement (68 min).
  - PMF 5145C (1951) - The Radioisotope — Part III: Practical Procedures of Measurement; Consideration of various measurement apparatus and techniques; absolute and comparative measurement (48 min).
  - PMF 5145D (1951) - The Radioisotope — Part IV: Methodology; Underlying principles and practical considerations governing tracer usage and design of tracer experiments; establishment of seven criteria of tracer methodology by means of illustrative experiments (40 min).
  - PMF 5145E (1954) - The Radioisotope — Part V: The Physical Principles of Radiological Safety, Sections I and II; Live action and animation explain ionizing characteristics of alpha, beta, and gamma radiation from external and internal sources; roentgen and roentgen measurement; maximum permissible exposure, both general and localized; principles and formulas for calculation of exposure from internal sources; problems of uniform and localized exposure by single and by continued uptake; effect of physical decay and biological elimination on dosage rate; concept of biological half-life and effective half-life (Sec. I, 25 min; Sec. II, 26 min; total, 51 min).
  - PMF 5145F (1952) - The Radioisotope — Part VI: The Practice of Radiological Safety; Practical considerations and techniques involved in safe handling of radioisotopes; basic principles of safety as outlined in the Bureau of Standards Handbook; layout of typical high-level radioisotope laboratory; protective clothing and metering equipment; control of exposure; decontamination; monitoring; shielding techniques (33 min).
- PMF 5146 (195?-5?) - The Radioisotope, Parts ? -?
- PMF 5147 (195?-52) - The Radioisotope, Parts ?? - XIII
  - PMF 5147A (195?) - The Radioisotope — Part ??
  - PMF 5147B (1952) - The Radioisotope — Part XII: Agricultural Research; Showing three classes of radioisotope work: (1) the use of a high-energy, beta-emitting radioisotope, such as phosphorus 32, in large-scale field tests of fertilizers, (2) the use of radioisotopes such as cobalt 60, in micronutrient studies with large domestic animals, and (3) the use of low-energy beta emitters, such as calcium 45, in major nutrient problems and autoradiography (40 min).
  - PMF 5147C (1952) - The Radioisotope — Part XIII: General Sciences; The radioisotope as a research tool that is adaptable to tracer investigations in all branches of general science; introductory experiment of self-diffusion of metals; nine additional experimental problems solved through the use of tracers; primary fields of general science include metallurgy, chemistry, biochemistry, and plant physiology (46 min).
- PMF 5148 (1950) – The Medical Effects of the Atomic Bomb: Part 2, Pathology and the Clinical Problem; Mechanism is thermal, traumatic, and radiation effects; clinical observations; diagnosis and prognosis; pathological material for illustrative purposes (37 min; color; "Technical film for professional personnel only").
- PMF 5149 (1950) – The Medical Effects of the Atomic Bomb: Part 3, Medical Services in Atomic Disaster (27 min, color).
- PMF 5150 -
- PMF 5151 -
- PMF 5152 (1950) - Psychiatric Interview Techniques, Parts I to XXI
  - PMF 5152A — Part I (44 min.)
  - PMF 5152B — Part II (18 min.)
  - PMF 5152C — Part III (12 min.)
  - PMF 5152D — Part IV (25 min.)
  - PMF 5152E — Part V (35 min.)
  - PMF 5152F — Part VI (19 min.)
  - PMF 5152G — Part VII (38 min.)
  - PMF 5152H — Part VIII (26 min.)
  - PMF 5152I — Part IX (43 min.)
  - PMF 5152J — Part X (58 min.)
  - PMF 5152K — Part XI (20 min.)
  - PMF 5152L — Part XII (23 min.)
  - PMF 5152M — Part XIII (32 min.)
  - PMF 5152N — Part XIV (31 min.)
  - PMF 5152O — Part XV (26 min.)
  - PMF 5152P — Part XVI (27 min.)
  - PMF 5152Q — Part XVII (52 min.)
  - PMF 5152R — Part XVIII (36 min.)
  - PMF 5152S — Part XIX (25 min.)
  - PMF 5152T — Part XX (49 min.)
  - PMF 5152U — Part XXI (44 min.)
- PMF 5166 (1949) - Electrocardiography; Use of cathode-ray oscilloscope to show magnitude and direction of galvanometer deflections caused by changing relative position of two oppositely charged points within a conducting fluid; Mathematical explanations relating human electrocardiogram to Einthoven's hypothesis (10 min; color).
- PMF 5167(1952) - Heat Disorders; Heat Exhaustion, Heat Stroke, and Heat Cramps Causes, symptoms, treatment, and preventive measures for heat exhaustion, heatstroke, and heat cramps; Physiological aspects of Undue Heat Load; Metabolic heat; Heat exchanges by radiation, convection, conduction, and vaporization; Body temperature regulation by nervous system, sweat glands, and circulatory system (25 min.).
- PMF 5171 (1951) - The Surgical Treatment of Carotid Body Sensitivity In Man; Surgical correction of carotid body sensitivity; Comparison of pre-operative and postoperative conditions; Details of surgical procedure (20 min, color).
- PMF 5175 (1949) - Gelfoam in Surgery; Use of Gelfoam® surgical hemostasis; Examples selected from several operative procedures (27 min.).
- PMF 5188 (1951) - Intramaxillary Loop Wiring in Treatment of Jaw Fractures; Technique of applying intramaxillary multiple loop; case history of 20-year-old male with fracture of right mandible; complete wiring procedure in the case of this patient (28 min., color).
- PMF 5189 (1952) - Dento-Alveolar Surgery, Removal of Impacted Mandibular Third Molar by Controlled Sectioning; Showing theory of controlled sectioning on simple mesio-angular impacted third molar (10 min., color).
- PMF 5191 (1952) - Dento-Alveolar Surgery, Excision of Chronic Periapical Infections; Case report of dental treatment of chronic periapical abscesses with a persistent, draining, cutaneous fistula; Method of making mucoperiosteal flap, excision of incisor teeth, window in labial cortex, and removal of pathological lesion (8 min., color).
- PMF 5196 (1951) - Intramedullary Fixation of the Femur; Techniques detailed (23 min., color).
- PMF 5200 (1951) - Breast Cancer Symptoms; Clinical diagnosis and treatment; Early treatment and diagnosis (34 min., color).
- PMF 5201 (1951) - Cancer — The Problem of Early Diagnosis; Early diagnosis and treatment of cancer of the breast, stomach, rectum, cervix, and lung (31 min., color).
- PMF 5203 (1952) - Caesarean Section — Extraperitoneal Pfannensteil Incision; Case history (23 min., color).
- PMF 5204 (1952) - Caesarean Hysterectomy (Porro); Surgical procedures for Caesarean hysterectomy with anatomical landmarks throughout the operation clearly indicated (17 min., color).
- PMF 5206 (1952) - Caesarean Section — Extraperitoneal with Cherney Modification; Case history (23 min., color).
- PMF 5207B (1952) - Caesarean Section, Low Cervical Paramedian Incision; Actual case history; Clearly indicating anatomical landmarks (22 min., color).
- PMF 5208 (1951) - Thoracic Surgery — Thorcoplasty, 1st Stage and 2d Stage in the Treatment of Pulmonary Tuberculosis; First stage of a thorcoplasty on 26-year-old male patient with pulmonary tuberculosis; case history for 34-year-old female tubercular patient who has already undergone the first stage of a thorcoplasty and the second stage of this patient's thorcoplasty is demonstrated; narrative explanation of the two case histories and surgical procedures involved (23 min., color).
- PMF 5210 (1952) - Thoracic Surgery — Decortication in the Treatment of Tuberculosis Pleuritis; Self-explanatory title (23 min., color).
- PMF 5211 -
- PMF 5212 (1952) - The Heart — Cardiovascular Pressure Pulses and Electrocardiography; Case history (35 min., color).
- PMF 5213 -
- PMF 5214 -
- PMF 5215 -
- PMF 5216 -
- PMF 5217 (1952) - Dento-Alveolar Surgery, Alveolectomy after Multiple Extraction of Teeth; Demonstrating surgical procedures for establishing a ridge of uniform height with smooth, even contour after multiple extractions (6 min., color).
- PMF 5218 (1952) - Dento-Alveolar Surgery, Alveolectomy in Extraction of Isolated Teeth; Surgical removal of bone containing isolated teeth and procedure for proper contouring of soft tissues (11 min., color).
- PMF 5219 (1952) - Dento-Alveolar Surgery, Alveolectomy and Multiple Pathology; Problems in removal of teeth from pathological bone and proper repair of ridge tissues (18 min., color).
- PMF 5220 (1952) - Dento-Alveolar Surgery, Excision of Mandibular Tori; Preferred procedures for reduction of lingual tuberosity and for proper retention of dentures (12 min., color),
- PMF 5221 (1952) - Dento-Alveolar Surgery, Excision of Gingival Hypertrophy; Surgical procedures and correction of dental ridge hypertrophied and flabby due to ill-fitting dentures (6 min., color).
- PMF 5226 (1953) - Caesarean Sections; Demonstrating the surgical techniques used in performing such caesarean sections as, classical caesarean section, low cervical section, extraperitonean section, and caesarean hysterectomy (43 min., color).
- PMF 5227 (1954) - Introduction to Occupational Therapy; Case histories; illustrate value and application of this interest-motivated activity with a therapeutic purpose (20 min.) .
- PMF 5229 (1953) - Dental Activities, Walter Reed Army Medical Center; Principal source of in-service professional dental training for Army and Air Force officers; Walter Reed Army Hospital, Central Dental Laboratory, and Army Medical Service Graduate School comprise the dental activities; Scope, functions, and varied aspects of dentistry (18 min., color).
- PMF 5230 (1952) - Uterine Cancer: The Problem of Early Diagonosis; Regular routine pelvic examination by general practitioner of all female adults would reduce the number of fatalities due to cancer of the uterus; cytologic method of screening and verification of malignant tumors by tissue biopsy (21 min., color).
- PMF 5231 -
- PMF 5232 -
- PMF 5233 -
- PMF 5286 -
- PMF 5287 -
- PMF 5288 -
- PMF 5289 (1954) - Presacral Pneumonography; A new technique which permits visualization, by means of X-ray, in the retroperitoneal space, particularly the adrenal and kidney glands (10 min., color).
- PMF 5290 -
- PMF 5291 -
- PMF 5292 - Medical Effects of Nerve Gas
- PMF 5293 -
- PMF 5294 -
- PMF 5295 -
- PMF 5296 -
- PMF 5297 -
- PMF 5298 -
- PMF 5299 (1954) - Combat Psychiatry - The Battalion Medical Officer; Role of the battalion psychiatrist; how typical cases of combat fatigue can be recognized and treated; Emphasis on prevention of manpower losses due to psychiatric causes; (37 min., From Navy Film MN 7499a)
- PMF 5300 (1954) - Combat Psychiatry — The Division Psychiatrist; Fundamental principles and practices of combat psychiatry; Role of the division psychiatrist, showing how he diagnoses and supervises treatment and reassignment of NP patients (33 min., From Navy Film MN 7499b). Features then unknown actors Leonard Nimoy and Fess Parker.
- PMF 5301 (1955) - Hemorrhagic Fever — Clinical Features; Clinical and pathological findings of epidemic hemorrhagic fever; current opinion on spread, cause, and control of the disease (45 min., color).
- PMF 5302 -
- PMF 5303 -
- PMF 5304 (1957) - Debridement— Part I— Multiple Soft Tissue Wounds; Adequate and minimal skin incision, incision of fascia, excision of devitalized tissue, complete hemostasis, primary closures and dressings (12 min., color).
- PMF 5305 (1956) - Debridement — Part II — Wounds of the Extremities; Eight different wound cases shown to demonstrate techniques of cleaning wounds and removing devitalized tissue and other foci of infection (33 min., color).
- PMF 5306 (1956) - Initial Surgery of Abdominal Wounds; Recommended surgical techniques used under combat conditions in Korea in the initial treatment of various types of abdominal wounds (30 min., color).
- PMF 5307 -
- PMF 5314 -
- PMF 5315 (1957) – Radical Retroperitoneal Node Dissection in the Treatment of Testicular Tumors; Dissection of germinal tumors; seminoma, embryonal carcinoma, teratocarcinoma, and choriocarcinoma; clinical and microscopical analysis (20 min; color).
- PMF 5316 (1957) - The Effect of Ionizing Radiation on Domestic Animals; Development of symptoms in burros; radiation and physiological changes in biochemistry, hematology, histopathology, and radiometric laboratory (22 min; distribution primarily to distribution to Central Film and Equipment Exchanges).
- PMF 5318 (1958) - Management of Burns — Part I, Supportive Care; Rule of Nines method of diagnosing burns is defined; minor, moderate, and critical injuries; initial hospital procedures for treating burns; importance of building patient's morale is emphasized (18 min; color).
- PMF 5319 (1958) - Management of Burns — Part II, Local Care; Local care of burned patients in dressing and operating rooms; essentials of supportive care; cleansing wound; debridement of skin; occlusive dressing treatment; skin grafting; air treatment; importance of preventing contamination of wound and changing dressings (15 min; color).
- PMF 5320 (1959) - Management of Burns — Part III, Skin Grafting; Skin grafting of limbs, hands, and body areas; autografting and homografting techniques; sheet method and postage stamp method of grafting (21 min; color).
- PMF 5321 (1959) - Management of Burns — Part IV, Rehabilitation; Optimum nutrition, hydrotherapy; infrared and ultraviolet light treatment; massage; exercise; functional retraining; occupational therapy (9 min; color).
- PMF 5322 (1957) - Animals for Research: Establishing and Maintaining a Disease-Free Animal Colony; Methods and factors in maintaining a disease free colony; techniques and equipment used in breeding; procedures in transporting the animals to research laboratories (28 min; color).
- PMF 5323 (1960) - Early Care of the Patient With a Spinal Cord Injury; Placement on litter and evacuation; traction for fractures; surgery for wounds; physical medicine and care; use of Stryker Frame; occupational therapy (17 min).
- PMF 5324 (1958) - A Method of Teaching Combat Surgery; New method of teaching principles and technique of traumatic surgery in combat; old didactic method of instruction; new method applied to debridement; actual combat conditions are simulated in laboratory (16 min; color; distribution to Central Film and Equipment Exchanges in CONUS and overseas).
- PMF 5325 (1958) - Electromyograph Procedures; Discusses the clinical application of electromyography in the diagnosis, treatment, and prognosis of neuromuscular disorders, and demonstrates the technique of operating the machine; treatment of lower motor neuron and spinal cord pathology, myotonia congenita and acquisita, and hysterical paralysis (18 min; distribution to Central Film and Equipment Exchanges in CONUS and overseas).
- PMF 5326 (1960) - Hearing Evaluation and Rehabilitation, physical and emotional rehabilitation at Audiology and Speech Center, Walter Reed Hospital; hearing loss and speech evaluation tests; hearing aid evaluation and training; speech training (24 min).
- PMF 5327 (1960) – Nephroureterectomy, clinical diagnosis of ureter infection; surgical procedure used in a nephroureterectomy; removal of left kidney with infected ureters shown (26 min; color).
- PMF 5328 (1960) – Gingivectomy, clinical aspects of a gingival condition of the gums; surgical technique used in performing a gingivectomy (16 min; color).
- PMF 5329 (1960) - Three-Quarter Anterior Crown, clinical technique for preparing and fitting a three-quarter crown on a maxillary anterior tooth (38 min; color).
- PMF 5330 (1960) - Correction of Mandibular Prognathism by Vertical Sliding Osteotomy, clinical manifestations and surgical techniques and procedures used to correct the condition (29 min; color).
- PMF 5331 (1960) - Technique of Biceps Cineplasty, clinical diagnosis; surgical technique; physical therapy, fitting of the prosthesis, and prosthesis training after surgery (26 min; color).
- PMF 5332 (1960) - Transperitoneal Bilateral Lymphadenectomy for Testis Tumor, surgical techniques for making incision and performing dissection; advantages and technique of the midline transperitoneal approach (12 min; color).
- PMF 5333 -
- PMF 5334 -
- PMF 5335 -
- PMF 5336 (1960) - Total Body Measurement of Natural & Acquired Radioactivity in Man (11 min.)
- PMF 5337 -
- PMF 5338 -
- PMF 5339 (1961) – Basic Autopsy Procedure.
- PMF 5340 -
- PMF 5370 -
- PMF 5371 (196?) – Surgical Excision of Cyst from the Mouth.
- PMF 5372 -
- PMF 5381 -
- PMF 5382 (1964) - Rehabilitation of Bilateral Amputee - Exercises: Fitting of and Training with Prostheses (33 min.)
- PMF 5383 -
- PMF 5396 -
- PMF 5397 (1966) – Mammaplasty: The Strömbeck Technique; Demonstration of reduction of mammaplasty using Strombeck surgical technique as performed on 23-year-old patient.
- PMF 5398 -
- PMF 5399 -
- PMF 5400 - Insects and Borne Diseases
- PMF 5414 -
- PMF 5415 (1968) – Army Medicine in Vietnam. (In French: 1, 2, 3)
- PMF 5416 (1967) – Filariasis; With Dr Donald L. Price, MD.
- PMF 5429 -
