= Joe Valentine =

American baseball player (born 1979)

- Pitcher
- Born: December 24, 1979 (age 46); Las Vegas, Nevada, U.S.
- Bats: Right Throws: Right

MLB debut
- August 23, 2003, for the Cincinnati Reds

MLB statistics
- Win–loss record: 2–4
- Earned run average: 4.70
- Strikeouts: 39
- Stats at Baseball Reference

Teams
- Cincinnati Reds (2003–2005)

Joseph John Valentine (born December 24, 1979) is an American former professional baseball pitcher who played in Major League Baseball for the Cincinnati Reds.

He is 6'2" tall, weighs 195 pounds and bats and throws right-handed.

== Early life and amateur career ==
Valentine was born at Sunrise Hospital & Medical Center in Nevada to Deb Valentine on Christmas Eve in 1979. His biological father is a man who, as of 2005, he did not know. He was raised by Deb and her life partner, Doreen, who he also considered his mother. The family moved to North Babylon, New York when Valentine was only two years old.

As a freshman, he attended St. Anthony's High School but later transferred to Deer Park High School in Deer Park, New York. He played primarily as a catcher and attracted little attention from college recruiters due to his mediocre offense.

Valentine initially accepted a scholarship to play college baseball at Dowling College in Long Island but transferred after one semester to Jefferson Davis Community College in Alabama. At Jefferson Davis, he was named NJCAA All-Region XXII.

He was drafted by the Chicago White Sox in the 26th round of the 1999 amateur draft out of Jefferson Davis and began his professional career that year.

== Professional career ==
Splitting time between the Arizona League White Sox and Bristol White Sox, Valentine went a combined 0–0 with a 5.57 ERA in 14 relief appearances.

He missed part of the 2000 season while pitching for Bristol, appearing in just 19 games with a record of 2–1 with 7 saves. Valentine greatly improved in 2001, going a combined 7–3 with a 1.79 ERA in 57 relief appearances. He split time between the Kannapolis Intimidators and Winston-Salem Warthogs, saving 22 total games and striking out 83 batters in 75 1/3 innings of work. His time with the Warthogs was especially impressive – with them, he appeared in 27 games, saving eight games and posting a 5–1 record with a 1.01 ERA.

On December 13, 2001, Valentine was drafted in the rule 5 draft by the Montreal Expos. That same day, the Detroit Tigers purchased him. On April 5, 2002, he was returned to the White Sox by the Tigers.

In 2002, Valentine was a Double-A All-Star, Baseball America 1st team Minor League All-Star, and Southern League All-Star. He spent that entire season with the Birmingham Barons, making 55 relief appearances, posting a 4–1 record with a 1.97 ERA and saving 36 games. He also struck out 63 batters in 59 1/3 innings of work.

Following his outstanding 2002 season, Valentine was involved in a major trade that sent Keith Foulke, Mark Johnson, cash and himself to the Oakland Athletics for players to be named later and Billy Koch. The players to be named later ended up being Neal Cotts and minor leaguer Daylan Holt.

== Major leagues ==
Pitching for the Sacramento River Cats, Valentine slumped to a 1–3 record and 4.82 ERA, and was traded to the Cincinnati Reds with minor leaguer Jeff Bruksch and Aaron Harang for José Guillén. In nine games with the Louisville Bats, he went 1–0 with a 0.79 ERA, prompting his promotion to the majors. Facing the Houston Astros on August 24, Valentine appeared in his first big league game, allowing one run in one inning of work. He appeared in two games in the majors in 2003, posting an ERA of 18.00. Overall in the minors, he went 2–3 with a 4.10 ERA.

2004 was the first season in which Valentine had ever started a game professionally. He made 24 appearances for the Reds that year, making one start (which he lost) and posting a 2–3 record with a 4.22 ERA. In 30 minor league appearances (nine starts), all with the Bats, he went 5–5 with a 5.01 ERA.

Valentine had a poor year in 2005. In 16 major league appearances with the Reds, he went 0–1 with an 8.16 ERA. In 49 relief appearances with the Bats, he went 0–7 with a 4.70 ERA. Combined, he went 0–8 with a 4.22 ERA. He was granted free agency in December.

Signed by the Houston Astros, Valentine made 20 appearances with their Triple-A affiliate, the Round Rock Express. With them, he went 1–2 with a 4.70 ERA. In June, he was released, and in early July he was picked up by the Milwaukee Brewers. In 22 games with their Double-A affiliate the Huntsville Stars, he went 2–0 with a 2.97 ERA, saving 13 games. Combined, he went 3–2 with a 3.84 ERA in 61 innings that season.

Despite pitching well during the second half of the 2006 season, Valentine was granted free agency by the Brewers. He was not picked up by any major league baseball team, so he went to pitch in Japan with the Chunichi Dragons (he never actually pitched for them; he pitched for their farm team). They released him in June, and the Long Island Ducks of the independent Atlantic League picked him up. In 37 relief appearances with them, he went 4–2 with a 1.54 ERA, striking out 37 batters in 35 innings of work.

Valentine started the 2008 season with the Ducks, making 14 appearances with them, saving six games and posting a 2–1 record and 1.62 ERA. In May, the Phillies signed him and assigned him to their Double-A affiliate, the Reading Phillies. After his release in June, Valentine re-signed with the Ducks, but on August 4 his contract was purchased by the Cincinnati Reds, where he was assigned to Double-A Chattanooga. He became a free agent at the end of the season. He returned to the Ducks in 2009, and in 2010 signed with Veracruz.

He was 2–4 with a 6.70 ERA in 42 games in a three-year major league career.
