= Wyandanch Union Free School District =

Public school district located in Suffolk County, Long Island, New York, United States

Location
- Wyandanch, Suffolk County, New York; United States

District information
- Type: Public
- Grades: PK–12
- Established: 1923
- Schools: 3
- NCES District ID: 3631800

Students and staff
- Students: 2,788
- Teachers: 172.50
- Student–teacher ratio: 16.16:1
- District mascot: Wolves
- Colors: Green and yellow

Other information
- District Offices: 1445 Straight Path Wyandanch, NY 11798
- Website: www.wyandanch.k12.ny.us

The Wyandanch Union Free School District (also known as Union Free School District No. 9 and often abbreviated as WUFSD) is a public school district headquartered in and serving the entirety of Wyandanch, in addition to parts of West Babylon and East Farmingdale in the Town of Babylon in Suffolk County, Long Island, New York, United States.

== History ==
The area which now constitutes the Wyandanch Union Free School District was part of the Deer Park Union Free School District until 1923. The Deer Park UFSD built the first permanent school building in Wyandanch on Straight Path at 20th Street in 1913. A modern Wyandanch grade school opened in September 1937, built for $120,000 – $54,000 of which was provided by the New Deal Public Works Authority. An addition to the Straight Path school was built in 1949 to accommodate the district's growing population.

In 1967, seven Wyandanch parents petitioned Dr. Gordon Wheaton, the Third Supervisory District principal, to dissolve the Wyandanch School District No. 9. The parents, supported by the National Association for the Advancement of Colored People, also asked Dr. Wheaton to order the 2,295 students in the Wyandanch schools (86 per cent of whom were African-American) to be divided equally into the nearby and more affluent, predominantly white Half Hollow Hills, Deer Park, North Babylon, West Babylon and Farmingdale School Districts. The Wyandanch school board (consisting of five African-Americans and one white man) opposed, and noted that the recently hired Superintendent of Schools had proposed a "$1,000,000 program designed to make Wyandanch a model school district." The superintendent noted that "the uprooting of culturally disadvantaged students to schools where the educational program is planned for the middle class would have damaging effects on our community's children." Rather than wait for a decision by Dr. Wheaton, the NAACP appealed directly to Dr. Allen, the chief of the State Education Department. On July 24, 1968, Allen rejected the petition to dissolve the Wyandanch School District; he told The New York Times that "serious obstacles imposed by existing law" prevented "dissolution of the district," which the Times reported "is now 91.5 per cent non-white."

In 1979, teachers in the Wyandanch School District went on strike for two months. The Wyandanch Teacher's Association demanded a 32 percent wage increase over three years, limitation of class size to 32 students, and teacher input in educational policy decisions. A 13.3% increase was turned down; a final compromise granted the teachers a 19.5% salary increase.

In 2010–11, the New York State Education Department removed Wyandanch Memorial High School – the district's sole high school – from its "Needs Improvement" list and restored it to "In Good Standing" status for the 2010–11 school year.

=== Elementary schools ===
In 1956, the Mount Avenue Elementary School was opened, at a cost of $1,155,000; in 1969, the school was renamed in honor of, slain Civil Rights Leader Martin Luther King Jr. On October 2, 1966, the $1.3 million, 29-room, Milton L. Olive Elementary School was opened at Garden City Avenue and South 37th Street with 870 pupils; the school was named for Milton Lee Olive III, an African-American private from Chicago who served in Vietnam where he saved the lives of four of his comrades by falling on an enemy grenade, an act for which he was awarded the Congressional Medal of Honor. 70% of the students in the Wyandanch School District were African-American in 1966.

In August 1958, the Wyandanch Board of Education began planning the development of a junior-senior high school for Wyandanch. Wyandanch started a 9th grade class in 1957–1958 and added a class a year until the high school opened. The school district obtained 10 acres (40,000 m^{2}) between South 32nd Street and Little East Neck Road and between Garden City Avenue and Brooklyn Avenue by condemnation for the high school and its athletic fields. The groundbreaking for the school took place on December 6, 1959, and the school opened in September 1961.

The LaFrancis Hardiman Early Childhood Center opened for pre-K education in 1969 and was named for a resident who had been killed in the Vietnam War in 1967. The original center was replaced in 1999 by the LaFrancis Hardiman Early Childhood Wing of the Martin Luther King Elementary School, having been demolished in 1996.

== Schools ==
- Wyandanch Memorial High School
- Milton L. Olive Middle School
- LaFrancis Hardiman/Martin Luther King Jr. Elementary School
