= Long Island Board of Rabbis =

- Type: Organization of Conservative, Orthodox, Reform, and Reconstructionist rabbis on Long Island, New York
- Location: Rockville Centre, New York
- Region served: Long Island, New York
- Members: 300 rabbis (approx.)

The Long Island Board of Rabbis is an organization of Conservative, Orthodox, Reform, and Reconstructionist rabbis on Long Island, New York. Its headquarters, previously located in Deer Park, New York, are currently located in Rockville Centre, New York.

As of 1988, the Board represented nearly 300 rabbis. They, in turn, served an estimated 700,000 Jews on Long Island.

== Issues ==
The Board has issued resolutions and policy statements from time to time on various issues. At times it has done so by itself, and in other instances it has done so jointly with other organizations, including the Long Island Council of Churches, and the Commission on Christian-Jewish Relations of the Episcopal Diocese of Long Island. Issues that it has focused on have included antisemitic incidents on Long Island, the Holocaust, taxation of houses of worship on Long Island, domestic violence, drug abuse, and anti-Black racism.

== Leadership ==
Present day President of the Board is Rabbi Susan Elkodsi. Past Presidents of the Board include Rabbis Joel Levenson, Lena Zerbarini, Michael Stanger, Elliot Skiddell, Susan Moskowitz, Simon Resnikoff, Julius Goldberg (Plainview Jewish Center), Tobias Rothenberg (Huntington Jewish Center), Esor Ben-Sorek, Arthur Schwartz, Philip S. Krohn, Paul Kushner (Congregation Shaarei Shalom), Stuart Geller (Temple Emanuel) in Lynbrook), Bruce Ginsburg (Congregation Sons of Israel), Alan F. Lavin (Temple Hillel of North Woodmere), Ronald L. Androphy (East Meadow Jewish Center), and Moshe A. Birnbaum (Plainview Jewish Center).

== See also ==
- New York Board of Rabbis
