= Let There Be Light (1946 film) =

Let There Be Light PMF 5019
- Directed by: John Huston
- Written by: John Huston; Charles Kaufman
- Produced by: John Huston, Army Pictorial Service, Signal Corps, U.S. War Department
- Narrated by: Walter Huston
- Cinematography: Stanley Cortez; John Doran; Lloyd Fromm; Joseph Jackman; George Smith
- Edited by: William H. Reynolds; Gene Fowler Jr.
- Music by: Dimitri Tiomkin
- Distributed by: U.S. Army
- Release date: 1981
- Running time: 58 minutes
- Country: United States
- Language: English

Let There Be Light (known to the U.S. Army as PMF 5019) is a documentary film directed by American filmmaker John Huston (1906–1987). It was the last in a series of four films directed by Huston while serving in the U.S. Army Signal Corps during World War II. The film was produced in 1946 and was intended to educate the public about post-traumatic stress disorder and its treatment among returning veterans, but its unscripted presentation of mental disability caused the U.S. government to suppress the film, and it was not released until the 1980s.

== Background ==
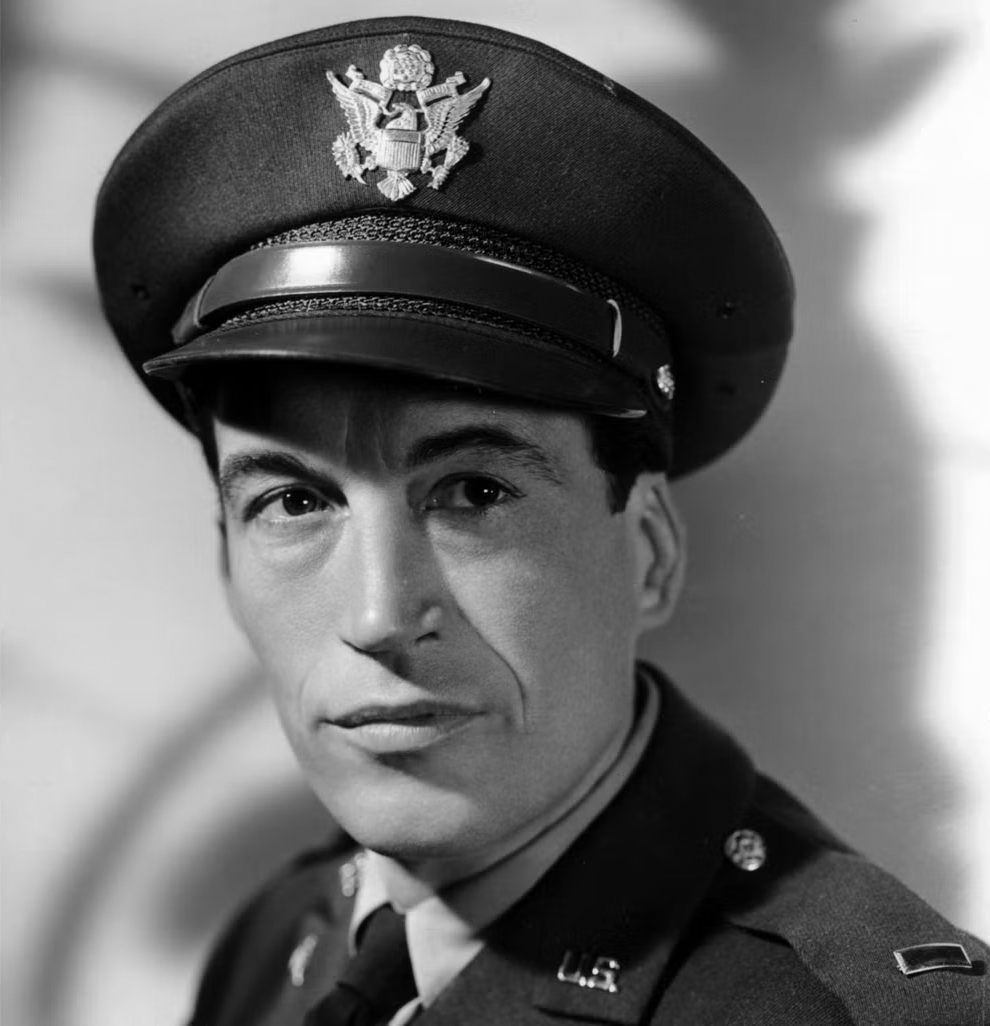
John Huston in uniform

Demobilizing near the end of World War II, the U.S. Army had the task of reintegrating returning military veterans into peacetime society. Many veterans faced the stigma associated with "shell shock" or "psychoneurosis", the former terms for post-traumatic stress disorder. To convince the public, and especially employers, that veterans being treated for battle-induced mental instability were completely normal after psychiatric treatment, on June 25, 1945, the Army Signal Corps tasked Major John Huston with producing the documentary The Returning Psychoneurotics. Huston visited multiple Army hospitals on the East and West Coasts before deciding upon Mason General Hospital in Deer Park, New York, on Long Island. The reasons for the selection were that Mason General was the largest mental-health facility on the East Coast, that the hospital was located near the Army's motion picture production center at Astoria Studios in Queens and that the doctors were very open and receptive to the filming and any psychiatric questions that Huston had. The new title that Huston gave the film, Let There Be Light, was a reference to Genesis 1:3 of the King James Version of the Bible and alluded to the documentary's goal of revealing truths that were previously concealed as too frightening or shameful for acknowledgment.

== Content ==
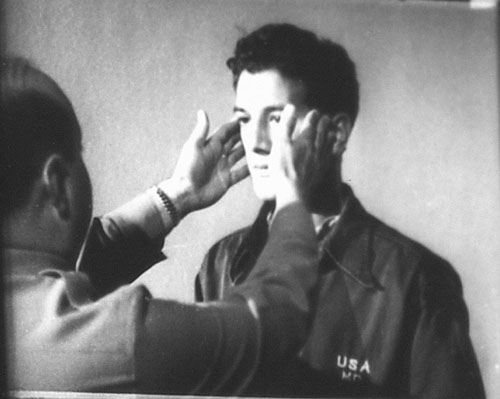
A scene from Let There Be Light

The film begins with an introduction stating that 20 percent of wartime casualties are of a psychiatric nature. Veterans are transported from a medical ship to Mason General Hospital to be treated for mental conditions brought about by war. A group of 75 U.S. service members—recent combat veterans suffering from various "nervous conditions" including psychoneurosis, battle neurosis, conversion disorder, amnesia, severe stammering and anxiety states—arrive at the facility. They are brought into a room and told by an admissions officer to not be alarmed by the cameras, which will make a photographic record of their progress. Next are scenes of interviews between a doctor and some of the patients about their problems and the circumstances leading to that point. Various treatment methods are depicted, such as narcosynthesis, hypnosis, group psychotherapy, and work therapy. One soldier with amnesia is hypnotized to remember the trauma of the Japanese bombings on Okinawa and his life before that point. Another is given an intravenous injection of sodium amytal to induce a hypnotic state, curing him of his mental inability to walk. The treatments are followed by classes (designed to reintegrate patients into civilian life) and group therapy sessions. Therapists reassure the patients that there is no shame in receiving treatment for their mental conditions and that civilians subjected to the same stresses would develop the same conditions. The documentary shifts its tone to a sense of normalcy, with the soldiers performing regular activities and complaining about everyday problems. The film ends with some of the featured patients participating in a ceremony in which they are discharged, not just from the hospital, but from military service, and returned to civilian life.

== Production ==
The film was made as one of the early entries in the Army's Professional Medical Film series, which began in 1945. It was shot during Spring 1945 at Edgewood State Hospital, Deer Park, Long Island, New York, which between 1944 and 1946 was part of Mason General Hospital, a psychiatric hospital run by the War Department and named for an Army doctor and general.

There are no personal credits in the film. Offscreen credits have been compiled by several sources. The film includes scoring by Dimitri Tiomkin. The cinematography has been credited to Stanley Cortez, John Doran, Lloyd Fromm, Joseph Jackman and George Smith. The film's editors were William H. Reynolds and Gene Fowler Jr.

The film crew shot about 375,000 feet of film–close to 70 hours of film. The final product was edited down to less than one hour.

Instead of hindering treatment, the cameras actually seemed to have a stimulating effect on the patients. Patients who were filmed showed greater progress in recovering than those who were not. This is an example of the Hawthorne effect, in which patients respond better when they are observed.

The documentary was revolutionary for its time with its use of unscripted but real footage of interviews. Huston placed hidden cameras in the doctor-patient interview rooms, one focused on the doctor and the other focused on the patient. This style of showing raw emotion would not be replicated in documentaries for at least another decade. Another unusual aspect of the film was its integration of blacks with whites. Although some Army hospitals were integrated at the time, the military was segregated until President Truman's Executive Order 9981 in 1948.

In the summer and fall of 1947, the U.S. Army Pictorial Service created a reconstruction of Let There Be Light called Shades of Gray (PMF 5047). Joseph Henabery directed Shades of Gray, using an all-white cast of actors to recreate scenes and dialogue from Huston's documentary.

== Reception, suppression and release ==
The film was controversial in its portrayal of psychologically traumatized veterans of the war. "Twenty percent of our army casualties," the narrator says, "suffered psychoneurotic symptoms: a sense of impending disaster, hopelessness, fear, and isolation." Because of the potentially demoralizing effects that the film might have on post-war recruitment, it was subsequently banned by the Army after its production, although some unofficial copies had been made. Film critic and author James Agee somehow saw the film in 1946 and wrote in The Nation: "John Huston's Let There Be Light, a fine, terrible, valuable non-fiction film about psychoneurotic soldiers, has been forbidden civilian circulation by the War Department. I don't know what is necessary to reverse this disgraceful decision, but if dynamite is required, then dynamite is indicated." He further lauded the film as "intelligent, noble, fiercely moving ... " Military police once confiscated a print that Huston was about to show friends at the Museum of Modern Art, claiming that the film invaded the privacy of the soldiers involved. The soldiers' releases that Huston had obtained had been lost, and the War Department refused to solicit new ones. Huston claimed that the military banned his film to maintain a "warrior" myth that American soldiers returned from war stronger, that everyone was a hero and that, despite casualties, their spirits remained unbroken.

The film's eventual release in the 1980s by Secretary of the Army Clifford Alexander, Jr. occurred after his friend Jack Valenti worked to have the ban lifted. The film was screened in the Un Certain Regard section at the 1981 Cannes Film Festival. The copy of the film that was released was of poor quality, with a garbled sound track that "made it almost impossible to understand the whispers and mumbles of soldiers in some scenes."

In 2010, the film was selected for preservation in the United States National Film Registry by the Library of Congress as being "culturally, historically, or aesthetically significant." The National Film Preservation Foundation then funded restoration of the print and its soundtrack. The restored version was released in May 2012.

The National Archives now sells and rents copies of the film and, as a federal government work, the film is in the public domain.

== Legacy ==
- Paul Thomas Anderson's 2012 film The Master borrowed lines and themes from Let There Be Light, and the documentary is included as an extra feature on the DVD/Blu-ray releases of Anderson's film.
