= Deer Park School District (New York) =

Public school district on Long Island, New York, United States

Deer Park Union Free School District

Location
- Deer Park, Suffolk County, New York; United States
- Coordinates: 40°45′36″N 73°19′40″W

District information
- Type: Public
- Grades: PK–12
- Superintendent: James Cummings
- Schools: 5
- NCES District ID: 3608880

Students and staff
- Students: 3,905
- Teachers: 356.13
- Staff: 381.6
- Student–teacher ratio: 10.97
- District mascot: Falcons
- Colors: Maroon and grey

Other information
- District Offices: 1881 Deer Park Avenue Deer Park, NY 11729
- Website: www.deerparkschools.org

The Deer Park Union Free School District is a school district headquartered in and serving nearly the entirety of Deer Park in the Town of Babylon in Suffolk County on Long Island in New York.

== History ==
There have been schools in Deer Park for many years, there was a one room schoolhouse in the area since at the latest 1872. In 1967, several Wyandanch parents campaigned for the dissolving of the Wyandanch School District of the time (with the support of the NAACP) to the Third Supervisory District principal of the region, and for the students to be sent to nearby districts, including Deer Park. It was then proposed to State Education Commissioner Dr. James Allen. Allen later rejected it in 1968, "serious obstacles imposed by existing law". Robert Frost Middle School was opened in 1967, as Deer Park Junior High School. A showcase dedicated to the history of Deer Park is featured in the main lobby of Deer Park High School, showing the history of Deer Park, including memorabilia such as trophies and photos from as early as 1964.

== Schools ==
This is a list of all the schools in the Deer Park Union Free School District.

School name	Type Of School	Address	Grades	Principal
Deer Park High School	High School	1 Falcon Place Deer Park, NY 11729	9-12	Charles Cobb
Robert Frost Middle School	Middle School	450 Half Hollow Road Deer Park, NY 11729	6-8	Eliana Levey, Ed.D
John F. Kennedy Intermediate School	Intermediate School	101 Lake Avenue Deer Park, NY 11729	3-5	Kelly Benson
John Quincy Adams Primary School	Elementary School	172 Old Country Road Deer Park, NY 11729	PK-2	Christopher Molinelli
May Moore Primary School	Elementary School	239 Central Avenue Deer Park, NY 11729	PK-2	Tammy Alcalde
