= Brentwood State Park =

State park in Suffolk County, New York

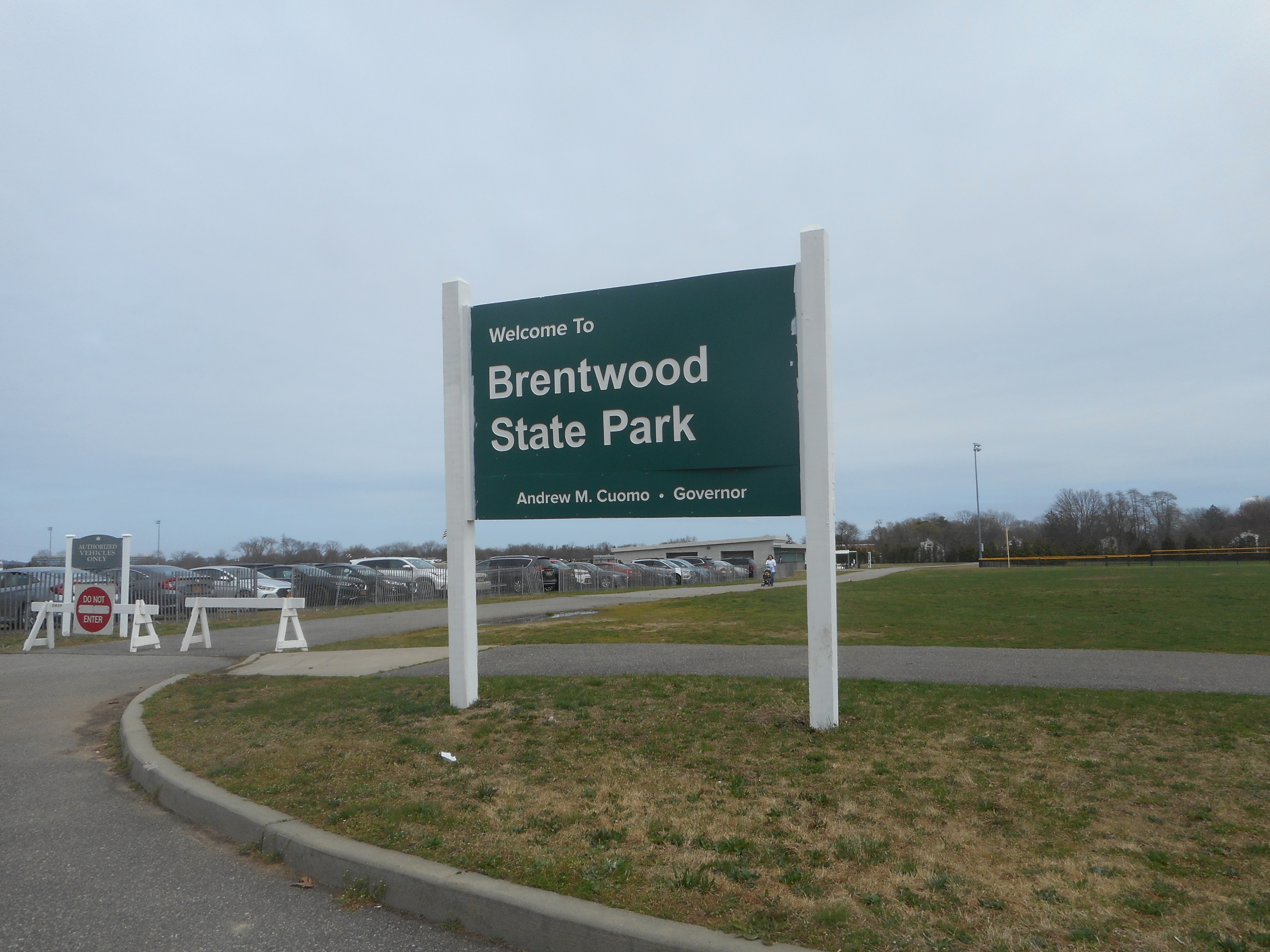
- Sign inside the Crooked Hill Road entrance to Brentwood State Park.

- Location within New York Location within the United States
- Interactive map of Brentwood State Park
- Type: State park
- Location: 375 Crooked Hill Road; Brentwood, New York
- Coordinates: 40°47′23″N 73°16′19″W
- Area: 52 acres (0.21 km^{2})
- Created: 2003
- Operator: New York State Office of Parks, Recreation and Historic Preservation
- Visitors: 750,886 (in 2020)
- Open: All year
- Website: Brentwood State Park

Brentwood State Park is a 52-acre (0.21 km^{2}) state park and athletic field complex located in the hamlet of Brentwood in Suffolk County, New York, United States.

== History ==
Brentwood State Park occupies land that was once part of the Pilgrim Psychiatric Center. As that facility underwent downsizing in the late 1990s and early 2000s, a 460-acre (1.9 km^{2}) portion of the property was purchased for redevelopment as residential and business space. The developer transferred 52 acres (0.21 km^{2}) to the New York State Office of Parks, Recreation and Historic Preservation to be converted into athletic fields.

The park initially opened to the public in 2003. However, the majority of the athletic fields and other facility improvements were not completed until 2009, after $15 million in improvements were made to the property.

== Park description ==
Brentwood State Park features eight artificial turf soccer fields and two artificial turf baseball fields. The two entrances to the park are on Crooked Hill Road (Suffolk CR 13) and Community College Drive (Suffolk CR 106). The park also features a maintenance building including a concession stand and restrooms. A playground was scheduled for completion in 2013.

== See also ==
- List of New York state parks
