= Oscar Marin =

American baseball coach (born 1982)

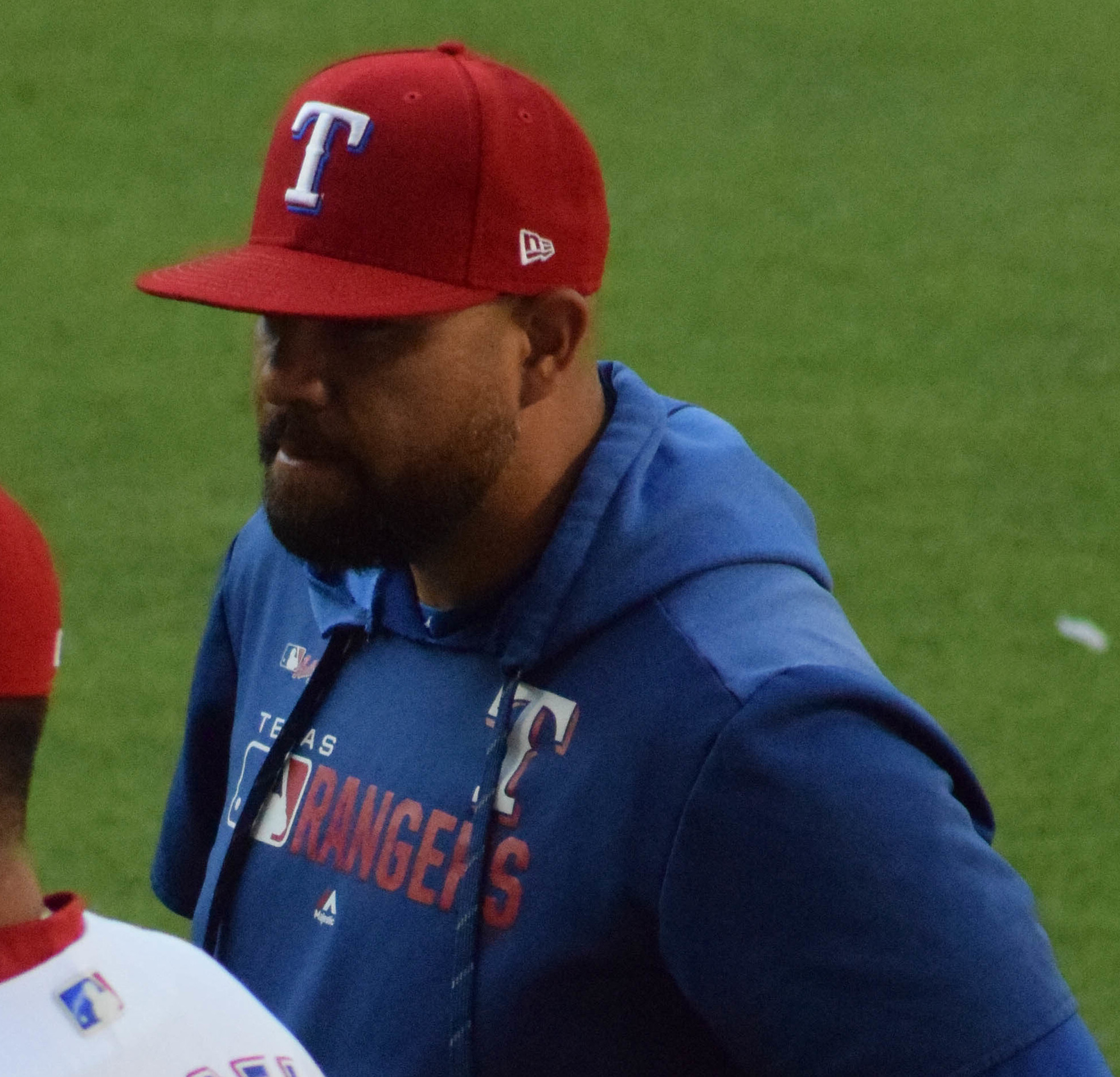
- Marin with the Rangers in 2019

Cincinnati Reds – No. 96
- Bullpen coach
- Born: December 5, 1982 (age 43); Los Angeles, California, U.S.
- Bats: Right Throws: Right

Teams
- As coach: Texas Rangers (2019); Pittsburgh Pirates (2020–2025); Cincinnati Reds (2026–present)

Oscar Marin (born December 5, 1982) is an American professional baseball coach who currently serves as the bullpen coach for the Cincinnati Reds of Major League Baseball (MLB). He has previously coached in MLB for the Texas Rangers and Pittsburgh Pirates.

== Playing career ==
Marin graduated from Chatsworth High School in Chatsworth, California. Marin played for Los Angeles Valley College for two seasons (2001–2002). He then pitched for two seasons (2003–2004) at the University of Arkansas-Little Rock.

== Coaching career ==
=== Amateur ===
Marin started his coaching career in 2005 as an assistant coach for the University of Arkansas-Little Rock baseball team. In 2006 and 2007, he was the pitching coach at Los Angeles Valley College. Marin spent 2008 and 2009 as the pitching coach at Harvard-Westlake High School in North Hollywood, California.

=== Texas Rangers ===
Marin began his career in professional baseball when he joined the Texas Rangers organization, in 2010, as the pitching coach of the Arizona Rangers of the Rookie-level Arizona League. He remained in that role from 2010 to 2012. He was the pitching coach for the Leones de Ponce of the Puerto Rican Winter League during the 2012 offseason. In 2013, Marin was the pitching coach of the Spokane Indians of the Low-A Northwest League. From 2014 to 2015, he served as pitching coach of the Hickory Crawdads of the Single-A South Atlantic League. In 2016, Marin was the pitching coach of the High Desert Mavericks of the High-A California League.

=== Seattle Mariners ===
Marin left the Rangers organization and was the minor league pitching coordinator for the Seattle Mariners in 2017 and 2018.

=== Texas Rangers (second stint) ===
Marin rejoined the Texas Rangers organization, for the first time on a major league staff, serving as their bullpen coach for the 2019 season.

=== Pittsburgh Pirates ===
On December 17, 2019, Marin was hired by the Pittsburgh Pirates as their pitching coach. On September 30, 2025, the Pirates parted ways with Marin.

=== Cincinnati Reds ===
On November 13, 2025, the Cincinnati Reds hired Marin to serve as their bullpen coach.

== Awards ==
Marin was named the South Atlantic League Coach of the Year for the 2015 season.

Sporting positions
Preceded by Héctor Ortiz	Texas Rangers bullpen coach 2019	Succeeded by Doug Mathis
Preceded by Ray Searage	Pittsburgh Pirates pitching coach 2020–2025	Succeeded by Bill Murphy
