= Wyandanch, New York =

- Hamlet and census-designated place
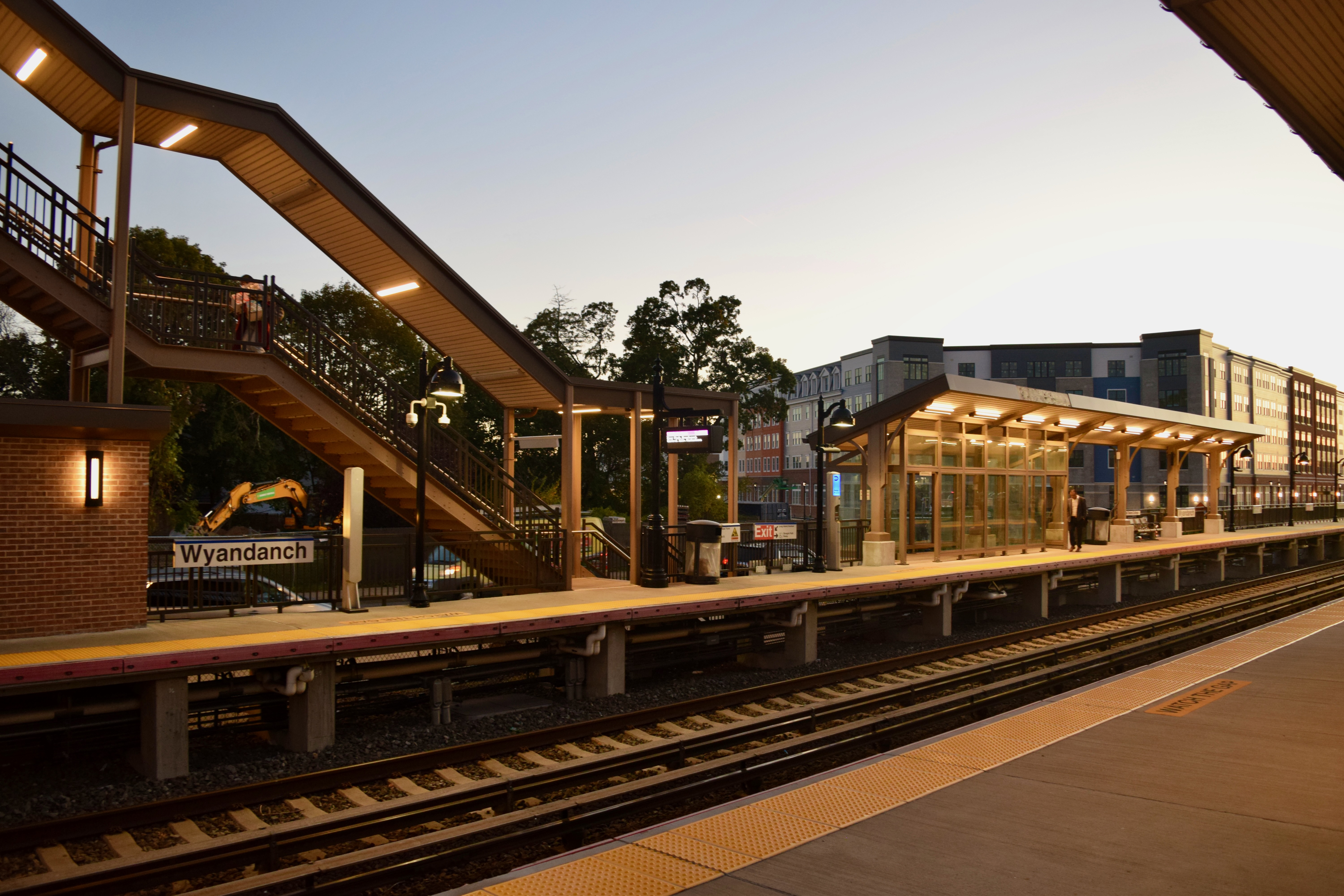
- The Wyandanch LIRR station in downtown Wyandanch in 2025

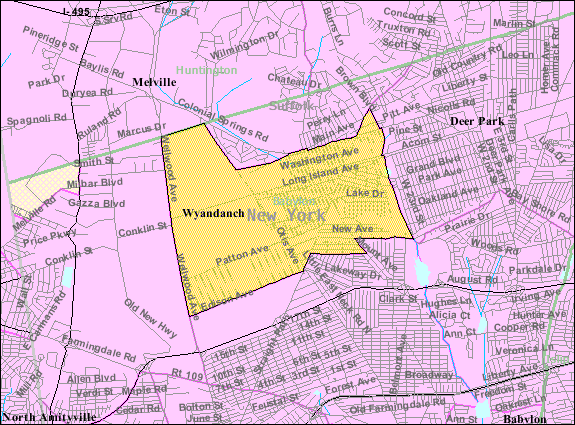
- U.S. Census map

- Location on Long Island Location within the state of New York
- Coordinates: 40°44′50″N 73°22′6″W
- Country: United States
- State: New York
- County: Suffolk
- Town: Babylon
- Named for: Chief Wyandanch of the Montaukett people.

Area
  - Total: 2.17 sq mi (5.63 km^{2})
  - Land: 2.17 sq mi (5.62 km^{2})
  - Water: 0.0039 sq mi (0.01 km^{2})
- Elevation: 56 ft (17 m)

Population (2020)
  - Total: 12,990
  - Density: 5,985.9/sq mi (2,311.16/km^{2})
- Time zone: UTC−5 (Eastern (EST))
  - Summer (DST): UTC−4 (EDT)
- ZIP Code: 11798
- Area codes: 631, 934
- FIPS code: 36-83294
- GNIS feature ID: 0971769

Wyandanch (/ˈwaɪənˌdæntʃ/, WY-ən-danch) is a hamlet and census-designated place (CDP) in the Town of Babylon in Suffolk County, New York, United States. The population was 12,990 at the time of 2020 census.

In the past, some or all of Wyandanch was proposed to become part of the never-realized Incorporated Village of Half Hollow Hills and later on proposed incorporating itself as the Incorporated Village of Wyandanch. However, those plans failed and Wyandanch ultimately has never incorporated.

== History ==
=== Native settlement ===
This hamlet is named after Chief Wyandanch, a leader of the Montaukett Native American tribe during the 17th century. Formerly known as Half Way Hollow Hills, West Deer Park (1875), and Wyandance (1893), the area of scrub oak and pine barrens south of the southern slope of Half Hollow terminal moraine was named Wyandanch in 1903 by the Long Island Rail Road (LIRR) to honor Chief Wyandanch and end confusion between travelers getting off at the West Deer Park and Deer Park railroad stations. The history of the hamlet has been shaped by waves of immigrants.

No archaeological evidence of permanent Native American settlements in Wyandanch has been discovered. Native Americans hunted and gathered fruits and berries in what is now Wyandanch and Wheatley Heights.

The Massapequa Indians deeded the northwest section of what now is the town of Babylon to Huntington in the Baiting Place Purchase of 1698. The northeast section of the town of Babylon "pine brush and plain" was deeded to Huntington by the Secatogue Indians in the Squaw Pit Purchase of 1699. What is now Wyandanch is located in the Squaw Pit Purchase area. Lorena Frevert reported in 1949 that in the Baiting Place Purchase the Massapequa Indians "reserved the right of fishing and 'gathering plume and hucel bearyes'."

=== Colonial settlement and after ===
Wyandanch (West Deer Park before 1903) evolved out of what was originally known as the Lower Half Way Hollow Hills. The area was first settled by Captain Jacob Conklin after he was given a tract of land in what is now Wheatley Heights by his father, Timothy Conklin, about 1706. Gradually, pioneers from Huntington began settling along the southern slope of the Half Way Hollow Hills as they purchased farm and forestlands from the Conklins. What is known today as Wyandanch originated with the establishment of the West Deer Park LIRR station in 1875. The present-day Wyandanch railroad station sits on the site of the 1875 station on the Long Island Rail Road. Jacob Conklin's 1710 "Pirate House" was the first house built in what became the town of Babylon.

The LIRR built the original West Deer Park railroad station, which incorporated a post office, in May 1875 at the request of General James J. Casey, a brother-in-law of President Ulysses S. Grant. Casey had purchased the 1,000-acre (400 ha) Nathanial Conklin estate in 1874, and he wanted a rail depot and post office located closer than the LIRR Deer Park depot that had opened in 1853. The 1875 West Deer Park/Wyandanch railroad station was demolished in 1958.

The first lots were sold near the station, around the time of a Long Island land boom in 1872. The efforts of a local realtor successfully targeted Germans and German-Americans.

In April 1903, the 1,343-acre (543 ha) ex-Conklin estate and historic Conklin family cemetery was sold to Bishop Charles Edward McDonnell of the Roman Catholic Diocese of Brooklyn, who resumed the bottling of spring water from the Colonial Spring. Eventually the McDonnell property became the Catholic Youth Organization's (CYO) summer camp in Wyandanch. In 2011, 14-year-old Michael Berdon, a descendant of Jacob Conklin, restored the 257-year-old cemetery and laid a brick path approach to the gravesite with the assistance of several local businesses.

On March 8, 1907, the Wyandanch post office was moved from the LIRR depot to Anthony Kirchner's General Store and Hotel on Merritt Avenue diagonally across from the railroad station.

=== Ethnic developments ===
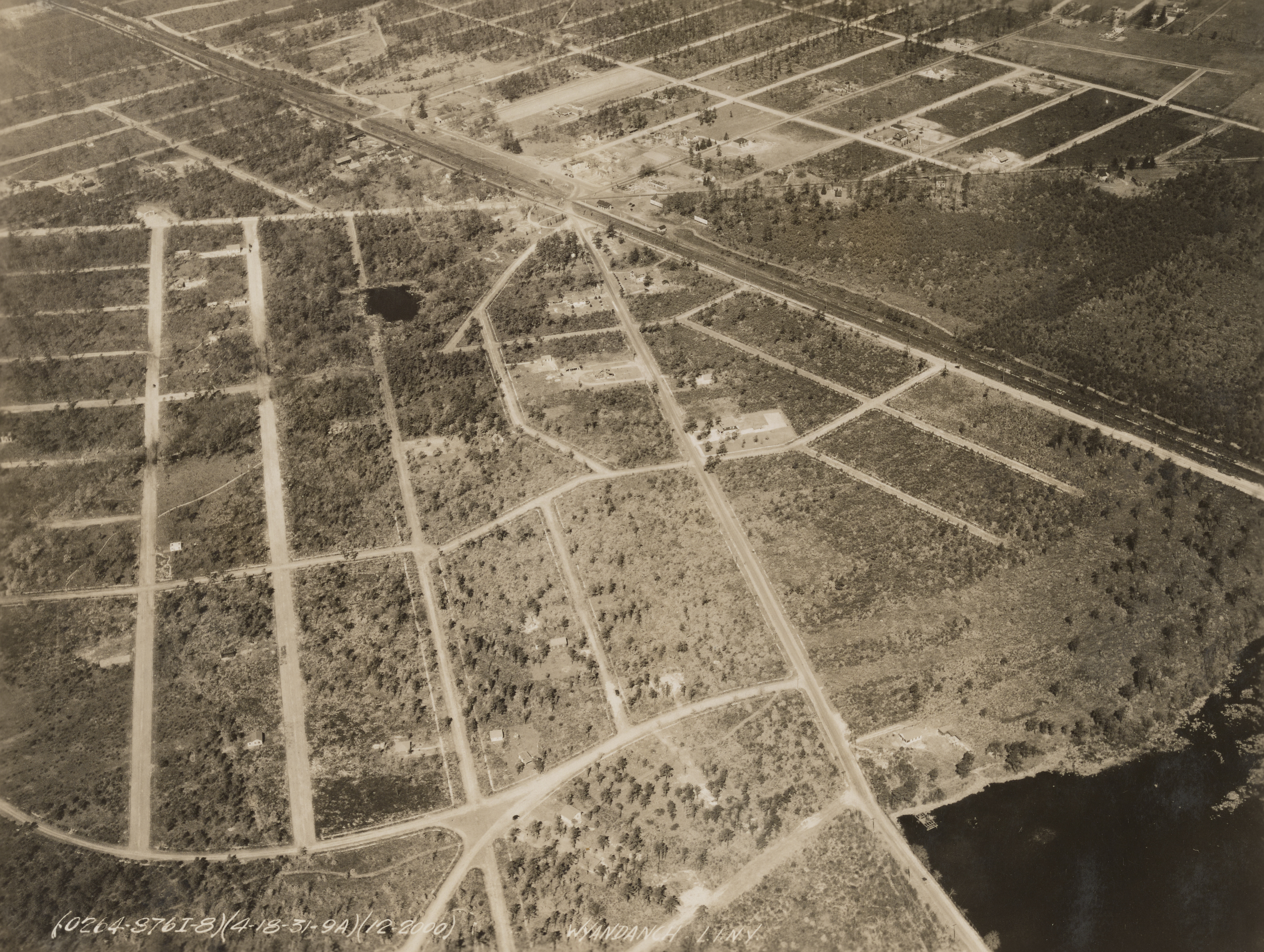
Aerial view of Wyandanch in 1931

Between 1880 and 1955, the dominant ethnic groups in Wyandanch were the German-Americans and Austrian-Americans. The earliest homes built in Wyandanch south of the LIRR were built by German and Austrian-American families. About a hundred "honest and frugal" German and Austrian-American families lived in Sheet Nine of the "City of Breslau" neighborhood as early as the 1880s. Germans and Austrians also worked in the Wyandance Brick and Terra Cotta works; prosperous German- and Austrian-Americans also lived in the hilly, secluded and sylvan Carintha Heights section, west of Conklin Street, which was developed by Brosl Hasslacher after the construction of the Long Island Motor Parkway.

Beginning in the 1920s and extending into the 1930s, working-class settlers (recently arrived from County Donegal in Ireland) began building small wood-frame bungalow-type homes in the fire-prone pine barrens in Wyandance Springs Park-there were no springs, no park and no roads-and in Home Acres. Irish and Irish-American families built homes on land they had purchased in the 1920s land bubble in Wyandance Spring Park or Home Acres. The newcomers wanted to escape from the crowded and economically depressed conditions in Manhattan and The Bronx, and yet be within an hour's ride of the "City" on the LIRR. More affluent and prominent Irish-American families in Wyandanch lived nearer the "village" in more prosperous homes with larger plots of land.

African-Americans have lived in Wyandanch since the 1920s, when African-American families bought plots of land and built their own homes in the "Little Farms" section of the West Babylon School District between Straight Path, Little East Neck Road and Gordon Avenue. In the Upper Little Farms section bounded by Straight Path, Little East Neck Road and Grunwedel Avenue (now Patton Avenue) in the Wyandanch School District pioneering upwardly mobile African-American families also began building their own homes. Mortimer Cumberbach and Ignatius Davidson opened their C and D Cement Block Corp. on Booker Avenue at Straight Path on December 6, 1928; as late as the mid-1950s, C & D Cement Block was the only large business owned and operated by African-Americans in Suffolk County.

In the 1950s and 1960s, African-American families established homes south of the LIRR in the 1950s and 1960s. A number of these families—both middle class and working class—purchased homes in Wyandanch because they were denied opportunities to move into other fast-developing white housing tracts on Long Island (such as Levittown) due to exclusionist real estate practices: steering, restrictive covenants, red-lining or price points. The rapid development of Wyandanch in the 1950s as one of the largest African-American communities in Suffolk County transformed Wyandanch politically into a hamlet which by 1960 voted overwhelmingly Democratic. In the 1950s and 1960s, the political interest of African-Americans in Wyandanch was mainly focused on winning seats on the Wyandanch Board of Education.

In March 1951, Taca Homes, Inc. offered expandable four-room Cape Cod style homes for sale in Wyandanch on a "non-racial" basis at the Carver Park development at Straight Path and Booker Avenue. The 59 first stage homes with basement, hot-water heat and tile baths sold for $7,200 and were eligible for Federal Housing Administration loan insurance. Veterans were told that they only need put $365 down and could have a 30-year 4% mortgage. (See Brooklyn Daily Eagle, April 8, 1951) Carver Park was advertised as "interracial housing". (Brooklyn Daily Eagle, April 8, 1951) Homes in the first and second sections of Carver Park were purchased almost exclusively by African-Americans. These homes required $600 down and veterans only had to pay $58.50 per month. The building of Carver Park and then the construction of Lincoln Park in 1956, with over 400 homes combined, triggered the transformation of Wyandanch from a mostly working class white community in 1950 to a majority working class African-American community in 1960, and in turn this caused white flight: a number of the whites who lived south of the LIRR moved and lower middle class African-Americans bought or built modest, individual homes in Wyandanch Springs Park and in the "Tree streets" area east of Straight Path. In the 1960s some whites living in the Wyandanch school district #9 north of the Long Island Railroad in the Wyandanch School District also relocated.

Hispanic-American families began to settle in Wyandanch in the late 1940s since the community offered affordable housing and land, within easy commuting distance of nearby defense plants and Pilgrim, Edgewood, Central Islip, and Kings Park State Psychiatric Centers – where jobs were plentiful.

=== 1967 racial disturbances ===
1967 Wyandanch riots
- Part of the Long, hot summer of 1967
- Date: August 1967
- Location: Wyandanch, New York, United States

Parties
New York State Police	rioters

The "Long, hot summer of 1967" included a reaction to racial tensions in Wyandanch. Over the first three nights of August 1967, racial disturbances broke out in Wyandanch as small groups of young African-American adults reportedly smashed windows in three stores, overturned two cars, set fire to the auditorium of the (now named) Martin Luther King, Jr. Elementary School on Mount Avenue, set fires at the Wyandanch VFW Hall and ambulance garage at South 20th Street and Straight Path, threw stones at the Wyandanch Fire House and pelted police officers with rocks and bottles.

Suffolk County officials intervened quickly and inventoried problems included joblessness, lack of bus access to area businesses and factories, a lack of recreational facilities for youth, and a lack of African-American representation in the police force.

As a result of the August 1967 disturbances in Wyandanch, governments, private businesses, the Wyandanch School District, community church groups and individuals, residents and non-residents acted to address the problems facing the community. The U.S. Office of Economic Opportunity and its Wyandanch Community Action Center worked to improve bus routes, develop job training programs and assist the indigent with accessing government services. The Great Atlantic & Pacific Tea Company (A&P) built a modern supermarket in downtown Wyandanch at the corner of Straight Path and Long Island Avenue. Today, this building houses Suffolk County's Martin Luther King, Jr Community Health Center. Genovese Drugs opened a modern new store on the east side of Straight Path north of the Blue Jay shopping center.

=== Failed incorporation attempts ===
In the 1950s, some or all of Wyandanch and its neighbors Dix Hills and Melville, along with the area known as Sweet Hollow, proposed to incorporate as a single village. This village would have been known as the Incorporated Village of Half Hollow Hills, would have had an area of roughly 50 square miles (130 km^{2}), and would have embraced the Half Hollow Hills Central School District (CSD 5). The plans were unsuccessful, and each would remain unincorporated hamlets.

Wyandanch also tried incorporating as its own village in the 1980s, citing issues regarding race and neglect from the Town of Babylon. This village would have been known as the Incorporated Village of Wyandanch. However, these plans also failed, and Wyandanch remains an unincorporated hamlet governed by the Town of Babylon.

== Geography ==
According to the United States Census Bureau, the CDP has a total area of 4.5 square miles (11.6 km^{2}), all land.

Wyandanch is a suburb of New York City. It is served by Exit 36 on the Southern State Parkway and Exit 50 on the Long Island Expressway.

The community was formerly known as Half Way Hollow Hills, West Deer Park (beginning in 1875), and Wyandance (in 1888). Topographically, Wyandanch's nutrient-poor loam and sandy soils are part of the outwash plain which was formed as the last glacier melted about 10,000 BCE. The outwash plain slopes gently towards Belmont Lake State Park from the Half Way Hollow Hills terminal moraine and from Little East Neck Road.

In the mid and late 20th century, the Wheatley Heights area (Half Hollow Hills School District) developed as a separate community (due to class and racial dynamics) but is still served by the Wyandanch Fire Department and the United States Postal Service.

== Demographics ==
Historical population
Census	Pop.	Note	%±
2000	10,546		—
2010	11,647		10.4%
2020	12,990		11.5%
U.S. Decennial Census; 2010 2020

=== Racial and ethnic composition ===
Wyandanch CDP, New York – Racial and ethnic composition Note: the US Census treats Hispanic/Latino as an ethnic category. This table excludes Latinos from the racial categories and assigns them to a separate category. Hispanics/Latinos may be of any race.
Race / Ethnicity (NH = Non-Hispanic)	Pop 2000	Pop 2010	Pop 2020	% 2000	% 2010	% 2020
White alone (NH)	409	579	451	3.88%	4.97%	3.47%
Black or African American alone (NH)	7,949	7,326	6,352	75.37%	62.90%	48.90%
Native American or Alaska Native alone (NH)	55	70	42	0.52%	0.60%	0.32%
Asian alone (NH)	58	121	163	0.55%	1.04%	1.25%
Native Hawaiian or Pacific Islander alone (NH)	3	0	0	0.03%	0.00%	0.00%
Other race alone (NH)	33	31	145	0.31%	0.27%	1.12%
Mixed race or Multiracial (NH)	315	234	350	2.99%	2.01%	2.69%
Hispanic or Latino (any race)	1,724	3,286	5,487	16.35%	28.21%	42.24%
Total	10,546	11,647	12,990	100.00%	100.00%	100.00%

=== 2020 census ===
As of the 2020 census, Wyandanch had a population of 12,990. The median age was 31.8 years. 27.9% of residents were under the age of 18 and 9.8% were 65 years of age or older. For every 100 females, there were 92.4 males, and for every 100 females age 18 and over there were 87.7 males age 18 and over.

100.0% of residents lived in urban areas, while 0.0% lived in rural areas.

There were 3,290 households in Wyandanch, of which 47.5% had children under the age of 18 living in them. Of all households, 34.9% were married-couple households, 16.5% were households with a male householder and no spouse or partner present, and 40.9% were households with a female householder and no spouse or partner present. About 17.6% of all households were made up of individuals and 7.4% had someone living alone who was 65 years of age or older.

There were 3,548 housing units, of which 7.3% were vacant. The homeowner vacancy rate was 2.9% and the rental vacancy rate was 6.5%.

=== 2010 Census ===
As of the census of 2010, there were 11,647 people, 2,926 households, and 2,379 families residing in the CDP. The population density was 2,588.2 inhabitants per square mile (999.3/km^{2}). There were 3,157 housing units at an average density of 701.6 per square mile (270.9/km^{2}). The racial makeup of the CDP was 5.0% White, 65.0% Black or African American, 1.0% Native American, 1.2% Asian, 12.3% some other race, and 4.1% from two or more races. Hispanic or Latino of any race were 28.2% of the population.

There were 2,926 households, out of which 52.7% had children under the age of 18 living with them, 37.0% were headed by married couples living together, 33.4% had a female householder with no husband present, and 18.7% were non-families. 12.9% of all households were made up of individuals, and 5.2% were someone living alone who was 65 years of age or older. The average household size was 3.95, and the average family size was 4.07.

In the CDP, the population was spread out, with 29.7% under the age of 18, 11.1% from 18 to 24, 29.9% from 25 to 44, 21.4% from 45 to 64, and 7.9% who were 65 years of age or older. The median age was 30.4 years. For every 100 females, there were 96.4 males. For every 100 females age 18 and over, there were 93.6 males.

For the period 2007–2011, the estimated median annual income for a household in the CDP was $54,527, and the median income for a family was $54,223. Males had a median income of $35,262 versus $36,719 for females. The per capita income for the CDP was $17,898. About 11.4% of families and 15.3% of the population were below the poverty line, including 21.9% of those under age 18 and 9.8% of those age 65 or over.

=== Religion ===
Until the early 1930s, Catholics from the area worshiped at St. Kilian's in Farmingdale. The first Mass to be celebrated in Wyandanch took place in June 1932 in a real estate building, with fund-raising eventually allowing construction of the Little Mission Chapel of the Our Lady of Miraculous Medal Roman Catholic parish, completed on June 28, 1936. An adjacent parish hall opened in 1941, followed in 1950 by an additional wing and a rectory.

The Franciscan Brothers moved their novitiate from Smithtown to the Wyandanch parish in 1949.

Lutherans in Wyandanch held their first services from August 1934 in the Republican Hall. In June 1938, the Trinity Evangelical Lutheran Church was opened on South 20th Street.

== Infrastructure ==
=== Transportation ===
==== Roads ====
The original roads in West Deer Park/Wyandanch were Colonial Springs Road and Main Avenue, Little East Neck Road, Upper Belmont Road (now Mount Avenue) and Straight Path. All were established before 1900 by the Conklins or the Belmonts or by real estate developers wanting access to filed lots by buyers. Straight Path in Wyandanch seems to have been developed in the early 1870s by the developers of the "North Breslau" filed lots north of the West Deer Park railroad station. What is now called Long Island Avenue (established in 1895) was originally known as Conklin Street, designed to provide easier access between the village of Farmingdale and the new real estate sites in the future Wyandanch. A section of William K. Vanderbilt Jr.'s Long Island Motor Parkway toll road had two concrete overpass bridges crossing hollows at Little East Neck Road and Colonial Springs Road (across from the Wheatley Heights Post Office). The parkway – abandoned in 1938 – was eventually dug up and the bridges demolished in the early 1960s to make room for the Westwood Village housing estate in Wheatley Heights.

Working class Wyandanch was sandwiched between the wealthy estates of the Belmonts, the Corbins, and the Guggenheims in North Babylon – along with the Dr. Herman B. Baruch estate in Wheatley Heights. What is now known as Wheatley Heights was mapped out as real estate sub-divisions of Wyandanch (including Wheatley Heights Estates, and Harlem Park) by Bellerose developer William Geiger (the names Geiger Lake park and pool) in 1913 following the development of the Long Island Motor Parkway. The filed lot sub-divisions south of the LIRR and east of Straight Path were known as the Colonial Springs Development Corp property. These lots ran from Straight Path to the Carlls River.

In 1941, Robert Moses' Southern State Parkway was opened to Belmont Lake State Park in North Babylon. Wyandanch residents were able to enter and exit the parkway at Exit 36 at Straight Path in West Babylon.

==== Rail ====
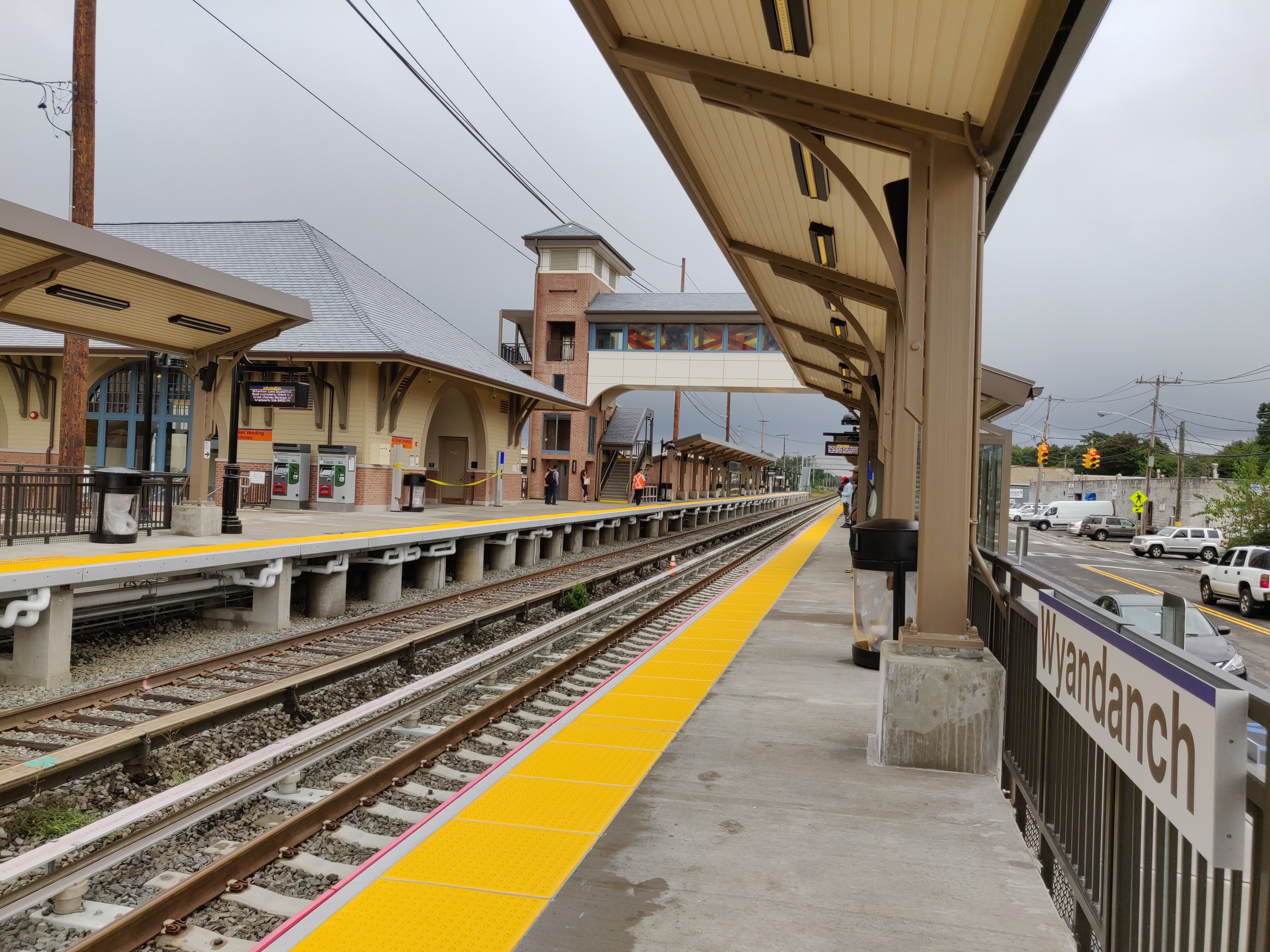
The Wyandanch LIRR station, seen in 2018 following its 2010s rebuild

In 1875, a station was built in Wyandanch on the Long Island Rail Road. It was demolished in June 1958 and replaced with a station building that was, in turn, replaced in 1986. The station was completely rebuilt in 2018 as part of the Double Track Project on the LIRR's Ronkonkoma Branch.

==== Buses ====
Wyandanch is served by multiple bus routes operated by Suffolk County Transit:

- 3 (Babylon LIRR station – Walt Whitman Shops)
- 4 (Amityville LIRR station – Smith Haven Mall)
- 12 (Farmingdale State College – Bay Shore)

=== Utilities ===
As late as 1980, hundreds of homeowners in Wyandanch were not served by the public water mains of the Suffolk County Water Authority but relied on private water wells. After community action, public water was extended to thousands of homes in Wyandanch, West Babylon and North Babylon by the late 1980s.

In October 2011, a sewer main was installed beneath Straight Path (CR 2) from the Southern State Parkway into downtown Wyandanch as part of the "Wyandanch Rising" program to upgrade and revitalize the hamlet's downtown area.

=== Emergency services ===
To combat the danger of frequent forest fires, the Wyandanch Volunteer Fire Company was established in 1925 and incorporated in 1928. A new fire station was built in 1959, and a second one was added in 1964. Water wells were drilled in the 1950s.

Ambulance service began in 1951 with the community-formed Wyandanch Ambulance Club. Other volunteer squads operated as well, and in 1980 the non-profit Wyandanch–Wheatley Heights Ambulance Corps was formed. The Martin Luther King Jr. Medical Center – a community health center – was opened in 1968, and moved into a new building in 1978.

== Education ==
The Wyandanch Union Free School District operates the community's public schools – including LaFrancis Hardiman/Dr Martin Luther King Jr. Elementary School, Milton L. Olive Middle School, and Wyandanch Memorial High School. Wyandanch was formerly part of the Deer Park school district until 1923. Deer Park built the first permanent school building in Wyandanch, on Straight Path at 20th Street, in 1913. A modern Wyandanch grade school opened in September 1937, built for $120,000, $54,000 of which was provided by the New Deal Public Works Authority.

In 1967, seven Wyandanch parents petitioned Dr. Gordon Wheaton, the Third Supervisory District principal, to dissolve the Wyandanch School District No. 9. The parents, supported by the NAACP, also asked Dr. Wheaton to order the 2,295 students in the Wyandanch schools (86 per cent of whom were African-American) to be divided equally into the more affluent and predominantly white surrounding Half Hollow Hills, Deer Park, North Babylon, West Babylon and Farmingdale school districts. The Wyandanch school board (consisting of five African-Americans and one white man) opposed, and noted that the recently hired Superintendent of Schools had proposed a "$1,000,000 program designed to make Wyandanch a model school district." The superintendent noted that "the uprooting of culturally disadvantaged students to schools where the educational program is planned for the middle class would have damaging effects on our community's children." Rather than wait for a decision by Dr. Wheaton, the NAACP appealed directly to Dr. Allen, the chief of the State Education Department. On July 24, 1968, Allen rejected the petition to dissolve the Wyandanch School District; he told The New York Times that "serious obstacles imposed by existing law" prevented "dissolution of the district," which the Times reported "is now 91.5 per cent non-white."

A liberal arts college was started in Wyandanch, with evening classes for over 200 students, in early October 1969, but soon closed.

Following the August 1967 disturbances, the Wyandanch Day Care Center was opened on Commonwealth Boulevard. The Wyandanch school district first provided space for 35 children in a classroom in the Straight Path Elementary School and later provided room in an empty building adjacent to the Milton L. Olive Elementary School. Ground was broken for the new center on September 13, 1970, and the Wyandanch Day Care Center opened on February 25, 1973. The two-story, red brick, eight-classroom day care center was constructed with a $1 million loan from the New York State Social Services Department.

On March 12, 2012, Newsday reported that the Town of Babylon will be building a larger, more modern Head Start facility at 20 Andrews Avenue in downtown Wyandanch. The new Head Start building, financed by $850,000 in State of New York funding and $1 million in U.S. Community Block Grant funding, will be larger than the current 4,000-square-foot (370 m^{2}) facility on Long Island Avenue near the LIRR station, which serves about 100 pre-schoolers. Head Start has served the children of Wyandanch since the late 1960s.

=== Public library ===
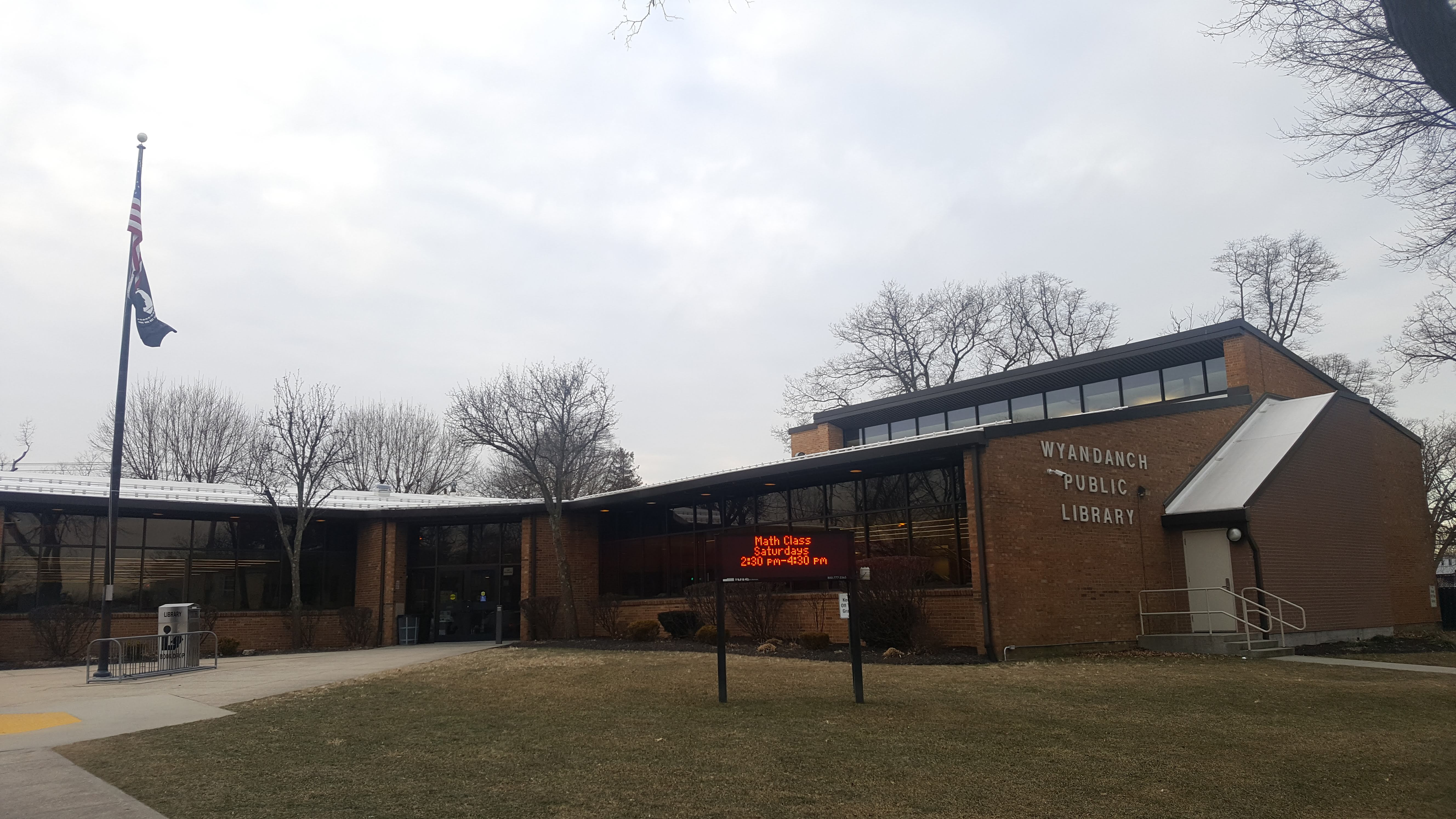
The Wyandanch Public Library

In April 1974, the construction of a public library was approved. Initially operating from two rented portable classrooms, the permanent building eventually opened in 1989.

== Parks and recreation ==
In July 1945, land located between Long Island Avenue and Grand Boulevard on the border between Wyandanch and Deer Park was donated by William Geiger to the Town of Babylon to be developed as a recreational site for residents of the Town of Babylon. The Babylon Town Board voted $3,500 to improve the "small lake." In 1946, Babylon cut the brush around the lake, dredged and cleared it, and rehabilitated "a sturdy log cabin" into concession and comfort stations. The Geiger Lake Town Beach and picnic grove was opened to the public on July 21, 1946. Geiger Memorial Lake was so popular that by 1948 "many houses" had been built on Elk Street on land with lake views. The town spent $156,000 refurbishing the Geiger Lake Pool in Wyandanch in the summer of 1989. The Town of Babylon demolished the Wyandanch pool in 2011. A new children's spray park has been built and opened in July 2013. All other recreational facilities have been removed from the park including basketball courts (built less than 5 years prior), the children's playground, ball field and tennis courts. The William Geiger memorial monument regarding his donation and desires for land use has been removed.

One of the major complaints voiced by young adults in Wyandanch after the August 1967 unrest was the lack of positive recreational activities. A youth center opened in January 1974, and in 1984 the Wyandanch Youth Services, Inc. (WYS) was formed. Since 1998 WYS has operated a full service from a new purpose-built youth center.

== Agriculture and industry ==
The early history of Wyandanch was mainly agricultural. There was a large peach industry, but in 1854, seventeen-year locusts so devastated the peach trees "that cultivation on any extensive scale has not been attempted since."

Water from the Colonial Spring in West Deer Park (now Wheatley Heights) was bottled in small blue embossed "West Deer Park" water bottles by the Colonial Springs Mineral Company between 1845 and 1854. The bottlers claimed it had "special medicinal properties." When Dr. George Hopkins of Brooklyn ran the Colonial Springs bottling works, "A bottling house was built and the springs were welled in with enameled brick and covered with glass tops."

Millions of building bricks were molded and baked at the Walker & Conklin and W.H. and F.A. Barlett brickyards using the Cretaceous clay and fine sand found in the area. The bricks were shipped out by railroad using a LIRR spur which ran along what is now North 23rd Street. In October 1888 the Wyandanch Brick and Terra Cotta Corp. was organized on the site of the abandoned Walker and Conklin brickyard to produce solid and hollow building bricks. In 1893, the plant was destroyed by a forest fire.

The Conservative Gas Corporation established a propane bottling business in Wyandanch in 1929. Today it operates as Amerigas Propane LP. In 1947, Joseph F. Walsh established a paper box factory in Wyandanch, and Ignatius Davidson and Mortimer Cumberbach expanded their C & D Cement Block factory, making it the largest African-American-owned business in Suffolk County. Fairchild Guided Missiles established a large factory in Wyandanch in 1951–1952 and built the Lark anti-aircraft missile and the Petral anti-sub and ship missile for the U.S. Navy. Fairchild Stratos left Wyandanch in 1963 and was replaced by Grumman Aircraft, which fabricated custom-built fiberglass and Plexiglas sections and nacelles for U.S. Navy aircraft. Grumman left the community in 1977. Max Staller built the first supermarket and shopping center in Wyandanch in 1955. All these businesses were located near the Long Island Rail Road track in Wyandanch. Beginning in the 1950s and 1960s, light industrial factories were established in Wyandanch in the northern section of the Pinelawn Industrial Park in southwest Wyandanch and on the east side of Straight Path between two African-American housing estates.

== Notable people ==
- Geoffrey Canada, Activist and Educator
- Rakim, Rapper
- Daryl Mitchell, actor
- Soul for Real, R&B Group
- Alexis Skyy, Reality Television Personality
- Keith Murray, Rapper
