= Long Island Council of Churches =

Organization for churches in Long Island

The Long Island Council of Churches (LICC), a not-for-profit 501(c)(3) organization, coordinates the ecumenical work of churches in Nassau and Suffolk Counties in Long Island, New York.

As of 2004, the LICC represented 800 Protestant churches, and had non-voting representatives from the Catholic, Greek Orthodox, and Jewish communities. It is located in Hempstead, New York.

== Mission ==
The Council's mission statement is that it: "unites diverse Christians to work together to improve the well being of Long Islanders and to promote interfaith understanding and cooperation." Its goal is also to: "promote understanding and cooperation between Christians and non-Christians".

== History ==
The LICC was formed in 1969, in a merger of the Nassau and Sullfolk County Councils of Churches.

The Council has issued policy statements from time to time. on various issues. At times it has done so by itself, and in other instances it has done so jointly with other organizations, including the Long Island Board of Rabbis, and the Commission on Christian-Jewish Relations of the Episcopal Diocese of Long Island.

The Board of Governors of the LICC has energetically criticized both Hebrew Christians and Jews for Jesus. In 1980, speaking of Jewish-Christian groups, including Messianic Judaism, it charged that "certain groups are engaging in subterfuge and dishonesty in representing the claims of their faith groups".

In September 1999, it faced cuts coupled with a cumbersome contract-renewal process by Nassau County. It attempted to operate without a contract, but at the end of the day it had to furlough chaplains at a local medical center and geriatric center.

In May 2000, Hope Koski became the LICC's first female president.

== Leadership ==
Clayton L. Williams served as the LICC's Executive Director in its formative years, as did Jack Alford in later years. Rev. Thomas W. Goodhue, a United Methodist minister, has served as its Executive Director in more recent years.

The Council is governed by a Board of Governors, which is made up of clergy, lay denominational representatives, and members of the business and nonprofit communities.
