= Deer Park Airport (New York) =

- IATA: ~~DPK~~; ICAO: none

Summary
- Airport type: Private
- Owner: Louis and Connie Mancuso
- Location: Deer Park, New York
- Opened: 1946
- Closed: 1974
- Occupants: Private users
- Elevation AMSL: 74 ft / 23 m
- Coordinates: 40°45′50″N 073°18′29″W
- Interactive map of Deer Park Airport

Deer Park Airport was an airport located in Deer Park in the Town of Babylon, in Suffolk County, on Long Island, New York, United States.

== Description ==
Deer Park Airport opened in 1946, after approval was granted by the Town of Babylon. It was owned by Louis and Connie Mancuso and was situated on roughly 52 acres (21 ha) of land.

The airport closed in 1974, after operating for nearly 3 decades. After closing, the land was sold and redeveloped.

== Incidents and accidents ==
- May 11, 1946: A Grumman Widgeon, piloted by M.L. Pruyn of Great Neck, New York, missed the runway at the airport by approximately 800 yards after experiencing an engine failure over the Long Island Sound during a return flight from Massachusetts; the aircraft made an emergency landing on a field at a farm near the airport. There were no injuries.
- October 20, 1956: Two small planes collided, injuring a 26-year-old student pilot from nearby Massapequa Park.

== See also ==
- Zahn's Airport – Another former airport on Long Island, located in nearby North Amityville.
