= Edgewood State Hospital =

Geography
- Location: Deer Park, New York, United States
- Coordinates: 40.776191°N 73.309463°W

Organization
- Type: Tubercular/Psychiatric hospital
- Patron: New York State
- Network: New York State

Services
- Emergency department: Yes
- Beds: 700-900

History
- Opened: 1940s
- Closed: 1971
- Demolished: 1989

Links
- Lists: Hospitals in New York State

Edgewood State Hospital was an American tubercular/psychiatric hospital complex that formerly stood in Deer Park, New York, on Long Island. It was one of four state mental asylums built on Long Island (the others being Kings Park State Hospital, Central Islip State Hospital, and Pilgrim State Hospital), and was the last one of the four to be built.

== History ==
The hospital was built in the early 1940s, believed to be a Works Progress Administration-funded project. It consisted only of ten buildings (including its massive, prominent 13-story main building), making it the smallest of the four as well (although it was planned to be a larger complex, those plans never made it past paper). The facility was commandeered by the War Department after the United States entered World War II. The War Department completed its construction for use as a psychiatric facility for battle-traumatized soldiers. Its entire campus (in addition to three buildings from nearby Pilgrim State Hospital and numerous temporary structures) was used as "Mason General Hospital" by the department.

When the war ended, the hospital was transferred back to New York State, where it essentially operated as the tubercular division of Pilgrim for a few years. In 1946 film director John Huston was assigned by the U.S. government to film a documentary about recovering soldiers in the hospital for propaganda purposes, titled Let There Be Light. However it was suppressed by the War Department and not released until 1981.

Advancements in medicine throughout the 1950s and 1960s offering alternatives to institutionalization led to deinstitutionalisation, and the hospital was closed by governor Nelson Rockefeller in 1971. From that point on, it was left to the mercy of vandals, arsonists and time. A 1983 fire lit by drunken teenagers gutted the rooftop on the nurse's quarters dormitory, while the main tower's was torched in 1985, leading to their demolition in stages throughout 1989. The final remaining structures were disposed of around 1990–91.

Today, the site sits as an open, state-protected oak-brush plains preserve under the New York State Department of Environmental Conservation (NYS DEC) department. One can still find remnants of the former hospital, such as the old rail spur, fire hydrants, etc., scattered about. People can obtain a free DEC permit for access to the preserve. Activities include hiking, biking, dog training, and model airplane flying.
