= Deer Park, New York =

- Hamlet and census-designated place
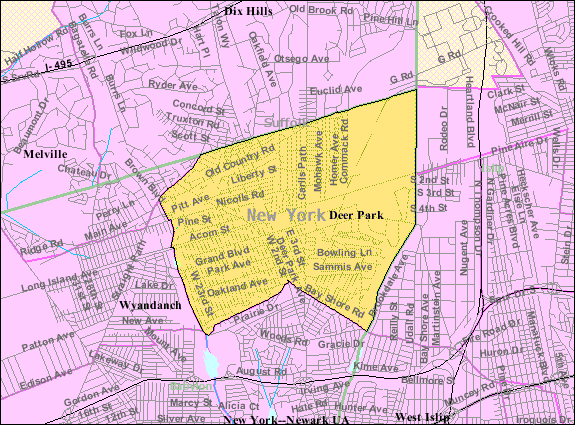

- Location on Long Island Location within the state of New York
- Coordinates: 40°45′42″N 73°19′45″W
- Country: United States
- State: New York
- County: Suffolk
- Town: Babylon

Area
  - Total: 6.17 sq mi (15.99 km^{2})
  - Land: 6.17 sq mi (15.98 km^{2})
  - Water: 0.0039 sq mi (0.01 km^{2})
- Elevation: 74 ft (23 m)

Population (2020)
  - Total: 28,837
  - Density: 4,674.9/sq mi (1,804.97/km^{2})
- Time zone: UTC-5 (Eastern (EST))
  - Summer (DST): UTC-4 (EDT)
- ZIP code: 11729
- Area codes: 631, 934
- FIPS code: 36-19972
- GNIS feature ID: 0948210

Deer Park is a hamlet and census-designated place (CDP) in the Town of Babylon, in Suffolk County, on Long Island, in New York, United States. The population was listed as 28,837 at the time of the 2020 census.

== History ==
Deer Park is located in the pine barrens in the northeastern corner of the town of Babylon. The town originally grew out of Jacob Conklin's 1610 settlement of the Half Way Hollow Hills, later known as Wheatley Heights. Charles Wilson started what is now Deer Park in 1853 about eleven years after the Long Island Rail Road arrived in 1842-when he established a large and productive farm. A post office was opened in 1851, closed in 1872 and re-opened on July 1, 1873. Deer Park had an elementary school in 1874. Prior to 1923, the Deer Park School District took in Deer Park and Wyandanch.

Farming was a staple of this small town for most of its history. Known as the "fruit basket" of New York state, the area was also famed for its dahlia cultivation. It was not until the effects of the post–World War II boom reached Deer Park that its economy ceased to be agricultural.

Deer Park had two industries before 1940: the Walker and Conklin firm baked red bricks in West Deer Park (now Wheatley Heights), and the Golden Pickle Works (1902) prepared pickles in Deer Park. Deer Park was the locale of the Edgewood State Hospital (1938–1969)-originally a tuberculosis sanatorium, and later an Army hospital during World War II. The Fairchild Engine and Airplane Corporation established a factory in Deer Park in 1956.

In 1946, the former Deer Park Airport opened. It operated until 1974; the land was subsequently redeveloped.

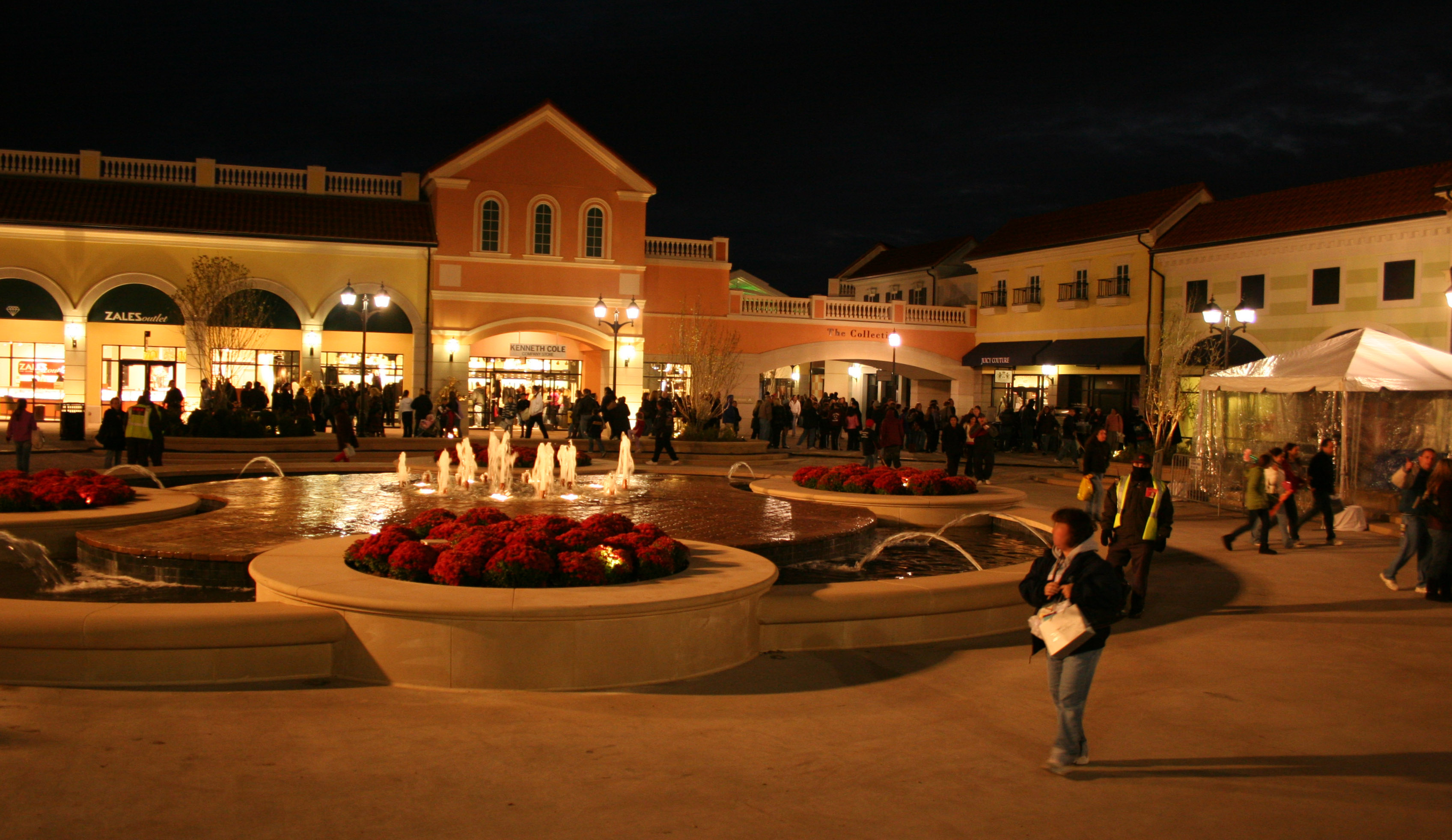
Tanger Outlets at the Arches

Deer Park is reputed to have been the favorite summer spot of President John Quincy Adams, as his preferred vacation destination from 1835 until his death. However, this myth was proven false. A Baptist minister, John Q. Adams, resided in Deer Park and shared the same name as President Adams, which is likely the origin of the claim.

On October 22, 2008, the $300 million Tanger Outlets at the Arches shopping mall opened.

== Geography ==
According to the United States Census Bureau, the CDP has a total area of 6.2 square miles (16.0 km^{2}), all land.

Deer Park is located in the northeastern corner of the town of Babylon. It is bordered to the west by the Babylon hamlets of Wyandanch and Wheatley Heights, to the north by Dix Hills in the Town of Huntington, to the east by Brentwood and Baywood in the Town of Islip, and to the south by the hamlet of North Babylon.

== Demographics ==
Historical population
Census	Pop.	Note	%±
2010	27,745		—
2020	28,837		3.9%
U.S. Decennial Census

=== 2020 census ===
As of the 2020 census, Deer Park had a population of 28,837. The median age was 41.6 years. 20.8% of residents were under the age of 18 and 16.6% of residents were 65 years of age or older. For every 100 females there were 94.7 males, and for every 100 females age 18 and over there were 91.7 males age 18 and over.

100.0% of residents lived in urban areas, while 0.0% lived in rural areas.

There were 9,510 households in Deer Park, of which 33.9% had children under the age of 18 living in them. Of all households, 53.3% were married-couple households, 15.0% were households with a male householder and no spouse or partner present, and 26.7% were households with a female householder and no spouse or partner present. About 20.9% of all households were made up of individuals and 10.8% had someone living alone who was 65 years of age or older.

There were 9,839 housing units, of which 3.3% were vacant. The homeowner vacancy rate was 1.2% and the rental vacancy rate was 2.0%.

Racial composition as of the 2020 census
Race	Number	Percent
White	16,173	56.1%
Black or African American	4,192	14.5%
American Indian and Alaska Native	143	0.5%
Asian	3,336	11.6%
Native Hawaiian and Other Pacific Islander	11	0.0%
Some other race	2,470	8.6%
Two or more races	2,512	8.7%
Hispanic or Latino (of any race)	5,206	18.1%

== Transportation ==
Since 1842, Deer Park has been served by the Long Island Railroad at the Deer Park station which, despite the name, has been mostly situated in the adjacent hamlets of Baywood and Brentwood since 1987 after years of being near Deer Park Avenue.

== Education ==
Deer Park is primarily served by the Deer Park School District, although a small portion north of Old Country road is served by the Half Hollow Hills Central School District (located mostly in the Town of Huntington).

== Fire Department ==
The hamlet is protected by the Deer Park Fire Department.

== Notable organizations ==
- The Long Island Board of Rabbis, an organization of Conservative, Orthodox, Reform, and Reconstructionist rabbis on Long Island, had its headquarters in Deer Park. It has since relocated to Rockville Centre.

== Notable people ==
- Dan Barry, reporter, The New York Times
- Kathleen Herles, voice actor
- Linda Yaccarino, media executive
- The Chiodo Brothers, movie effects producers
