= List of county routes in Suffolk County, New York (1–25) =

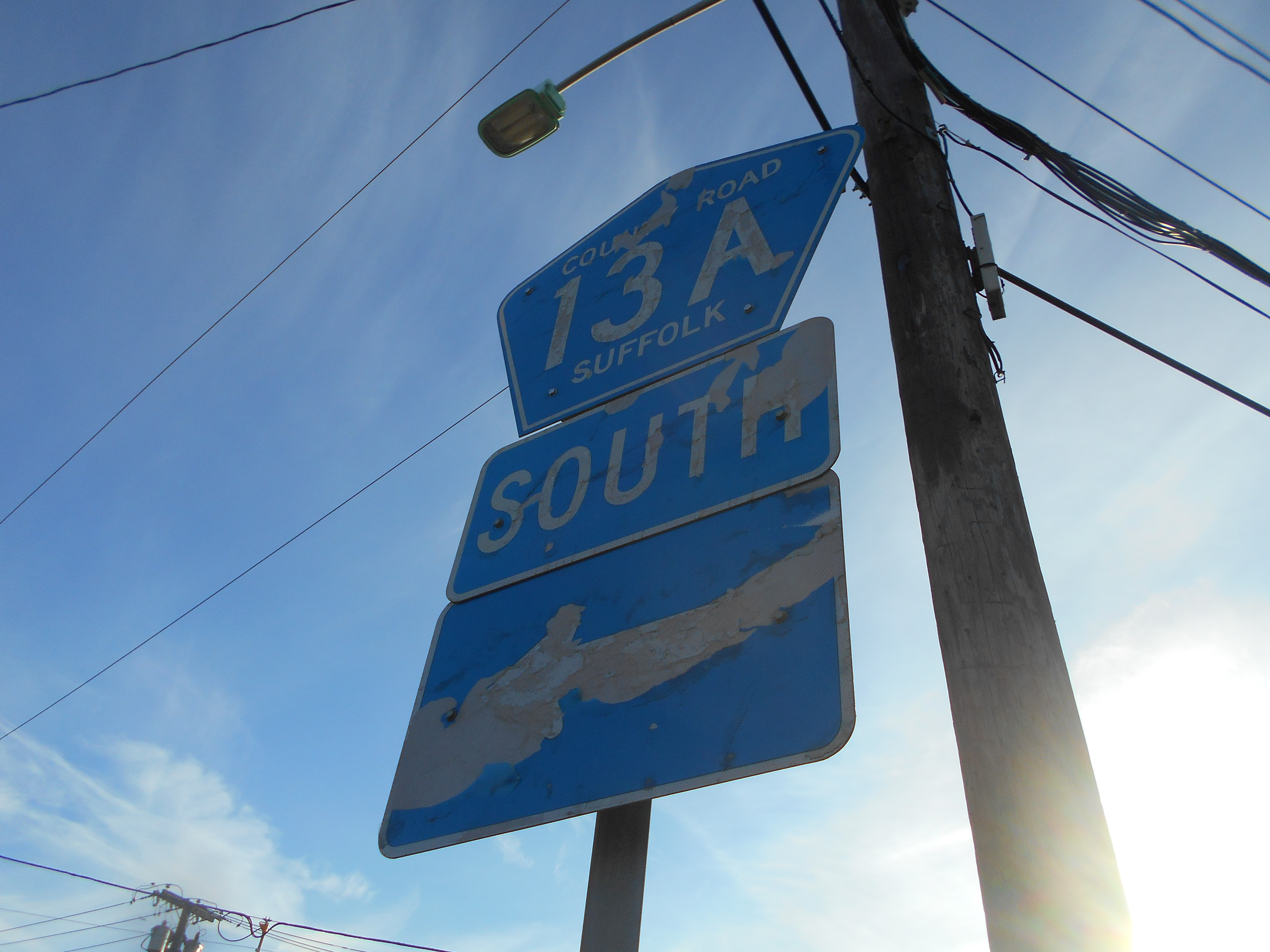
- Former standard route marker for county routes in Suffolk County; CR 13A shield on CR 50 in Bay Shore.

Highway names
- Interstates: Interstate X (I-X)
- US Highways: U.S. Route X (US X)
- State: New York State Route X (NY X)
- County: County Route X (CR X)

System links
- New York Highways; Interstate; US; State; Reference; Parkways

County routes in Suffolk County, New York, are maintained by the Suffolk County Department of Public Works and signed with the Manual on Uniform Traffic Control Devices-standard yellow-on-blue pentagon route marker. The designations do not follow any fixed pattern. Routes 1 to 25 are listed below.

== County Route 1 ==
County Route 1
- Location: Amityville–North Amityville
- Length: 1.52 mi (2.45 km)
- Existed: 1930–present

County Route 1 is known as County Line Road and extends for 1.52 miles (2.45 km) through the town of Babylon. It begins at NY 27A (Montauk Highway) in Amityville and heads north to the intersection of Joyce Avenue in East Farmingdale. Parts of the road enter Nassau County; however, the Nassau County sections are not part of CR 1.

Major intersections

Location	mi	km	Destinations	Notes
Amityville	0.00	0.00	NY 27A (Montauk Highway) – East Massapequa	
Amityville	0.51	0.82	CR 12 east / Old Sunrise Highway west (NY 900D) – Lindenhurst	Eastern terminus of NY 900D, western terminus of CR 12
Amityville	1.03	1.66	NY 27 (Sunrise Highway)	At-grade intersection
North Amityville	1.52	2.45	Joyce Avenue west / Matthew Drive east / County Line Road north to Southern State Parkway	Suffolk County maintenance ends 245 feet north of Joyce Avenue. County Line Road continues north to Southern State Parkway Exit 32S
1.000 mi = 1.609 km; 1.000 km = 0.621 mi

== County Route 2 ==
County Route 2
- Location: Amityville–Dix Hills
- Length: 8.53 mi (13.73 km)
- Existed: 1930–present

County Route 2 is mostly known as Straight Path and extends from the village of Amityville to the town of Huntington. It begins at an intersection with NY 110 in Amityville and heads east along Dixon Avenue to CR 47 in Copiague. From there it begins to move to the northeast until it eventually becomes Straight Path before the intersection with NY 27 in North Lindenhurst. The road widens into a four-lane divided highway ahead of its junction with CR 3 (Wellwood Avenue). This intersection contains turning ramps on all corners except the southwest corner, where Heathcote Road ends. The divider ends at Sherbrooke Road and the North Lindenhurst Fire Department, where the road returns to a four-lane undivided highway.

The road intersects an at-grade crossing with the Central Branch of the Long Island Rail Road. From there the road crosses NY 109 and meets the Southern State Parkway. As CR 2 approaches the interchange with the parkway, the road becomes narrower despite remaining four lanes wide. On the northwest corner of this interchange is the beginning of St. Johns Catholic Cemetery, where the road widens to accommodate a center left-turn lane. The northern border of the cemetery is along Edison Avenue, located near the intersection with Little East Neck Road in Wyandanch.

CR 2 narrows to two lanes with stretches occasionally featuring medians. North of Commonwealth Drive, the road become four lanes with no left-turn lane until it approaches the vicinity of Wyandanch Station. Past Winter Avenue, CR 2 narrows back down to two lanes, but with a center left-turn lane. The road continues in this manner until it reaches its terminus at an intersection with NY 231 in Half Hollow Hills.

CR 2 was assigned on January 27, 1930, to the portion of its alignment between Albany Avenue in Amityville and modern NY 231 in Huntington. It was extended west along Dixon Avenue to NY 110 on February 5, 1943, replacing CR 2A. An extension beyond NY 231 was proposed during the 1960s and 1970s and officially added to CR 2's alignment on June 22, 1961. The terminus was to be at the Long Island Motor Parkway; however, this extension was never built. The intersection between CR 2 and NY 27 was once intended to be upgraded into an interchange.

Major intersections

Location	mi	km	Destinations	Notes
Amityville	0.00	0.00	NY 110 (Broadway) – East Farmingdale	
Copiague	0.91	1.46	CR 47 (Great Neck Road) – North Amityville	
Lindenhurst	1.71	2.75	NY 27 (Sunrise Highway)	At-grade intersection
North Lindenhurst	2.49	4.01	CR 3 (North Wellwood Avenue) – Melville, Lindenhurst	
North Lindenhurst	3.23	5.20	NY 109 – Farmingdale, Babylon	
West Babylon	4.16	6.69	Southern State Parkway – New York, East Islip	Exit 36 on Southern Parkway. Cloverleaf interchange. No trucks or commercial vehicles allowed on Parkway.
Wyandanch	4.86	7.82	Little East Neck Road – Melville, Babylon	Former Suffolk County Route 95
Wyandanch	6.18	9.95	Long Island Avenue	Access to Wyandanch station and Long Island National Cemetery
Dix Hills	8.53	13.73	NY 231 (Deer Park Avenue) to I-495 and Northern State Parkway	Access to I-495 and Northern State Parkway via NY-231 northbound.
1.000 mi = 1.609 km; 1.000 km = 0.621 mi

== County Route 2A ==
County Route 2A
- Location: Amityville–North Lindenhurst

County Route 2A was a former suffixed extension of CR 2 assigned to Dixon Avenue between NY 110 and NY 27 from the 1930s to February 5, 1943

== County Route 3 ==
County Route 3
- Location: Lindenhurst–Melville
- Length: 6.84 mi (11.01 km)

County Route 3 is a north–south road that includes Wellwood Avenue and Pinelawn Road. It runs mostly parallel to NY 110 until it crosses over the Long Island Expressway, where it moves to the northwest to use NY 110 before its northern terminus with Walt Whitman Road.

Route description

County Route 3 begins as Wellwood Avenue on the Lindenhurst village line at Perry Street in North Lindenhurst, which quickly encounters a cloverleaf interchange with NY 27, where the road briefly becomes a four-lane divided highway until the intersection of Spieglehagen Street and becomes a four-lane undivided highway. The road divides again at CR 2 (Straight Path), and includes a northwest to northeast turning ramp. The divider ends at June Street, and the road returns to a four-lane undivided highway.

As the road intersects an at-grade crossing with the LIRR Central Branch and becomes a divided highway again north of Gear Avenue as it approaches NY 109. North of NY 109, CR 3 runs through the center of the Cemetery zone of southwestern Suffolk County along the following burial grounds;

- Mount Ararat Cemetery on the west side between NY 109 and Southern State Parkway.
- New Montifeore Cemetery on the northeast corner of the Southern State Parkway interchange.
- Roman Catholic Church Diocese of Brooklyn Cemetery on the west side from Southern State Parkway(exit 35) to the Main Line of the LIRR.
- Wellwood Cemetery on the east side north of Patton Avenue.
- Beth Moses Cemetery on the east side north of Wellwood Cemetery.
- Pinelawn Cemetery on the north site of the LIRR Main Line and northeast corner of Pinelawn Station.
- Long Island National Cemetery on the east side north of Pinelawn Cemetery.

Before leaving the cemetery zone, CR 3 becomes a divided highway again and passes by the headquarters of Newsday, which also includes the former right-of-way for the Long Island Motor Parkway. Both of these sites are on the southwest corner of CR 3 and CR 5 (Ruland Road). North of unsigned CR 5 (Ruland Road), CR 3 becomes Pinelawn Road, and runs parallel to Old East Neck Road until hitting Half Hollow Road, which leads to the only remaining drivable section of Long Island Motor Parkway (CR 67. From there, CR 3 takes a northwesterly turn and crosses over the Long Island Expressway east of exit 49, where it becomes a four-lane highway again approaching NY 110. CR 3 and Pinelawn Road end just north of NY 110 at Walt Whitman Road. The road continues northward as Sweet Hollow Road as it meanders through the Manetto Hills area past Gwynne Park and West Hills County Park before reaching NY 25, but not as CR 3.

Major intersections

Location	mi	km	Destinations	Notes
Lindenhurst	0.00	0.00	Wellwood Avenue south to / Perry Street east	Lindenhurst village line. Wellwood Avenue continues south towards Lindenhurst station and Montauk Highway
North Lindenhurst	0.14	0.23	NY 27 – New York, Montauk	Cloverleaf interchange
North Lindenhurst	0.61	0.98	CR 2 (Straight Path) – Amityville, Wyandanch	
North Lindenhurst	1.43	2.30	NY 109 – Farmingdale, Babylon	
West Babylon	1.85	2.98	Southern State Parkway – New York, East Islip	Exit 35 on Southern Parkway. No trucks or commercial vehicles allowed on Parkway.
East Farmingdale	3.53	5.68	Conklin Street west / Long Island Avenue east – Farmingdale, Wyandanch	Serves Pinelawn station
Melville	5.05	8.13	Ruland Road / Colonial Springs Road (CR 5)	
Melville	5.87	9.45	Half Hollow Road east	Former routing of the Long Island Motor Parkway
Melville	6.14	9.88	I-495 (Long Island Expressway) – New York, Riverhead	Access to I-495 via service roads. Park & Ride located on North Service Road (towards I-495 west).
Melville	6.75	10.86	NY 110 (Broad Hollow Road) to Northern State Parkway – Huntington, Amityville	Access to Northern State Parkway via NY-110 north.
Melville	6.84	11.01	Walt Whitman Road / Sweet Hollow Road north	Former routing of NY 110
1.000 mi = 1.609 km; 1.000 km = 0.621 mi

== County Route 4 ==
County Route 4
- Location: North Babylon–Commack
- Length: 9.30 mi (14.97 km)
- Existed: 1930–present

County Route 4 consists mainly of Commack Road. The road starts at a northeast angle off of NY 231, and immediately has an intersection with Carll's Straight Path to the northwest. The road continues to the northeast as it crosses the Main Line of the Long Island Rail Road. A realigned section exists on the western border of the former Edgewood State Hospital and current Pilgrim State Hospital. The segment in front of Edgewood Hospital was intended to either be replaced by or run parallel to the formerly proposed Babylon–Northport Expressway.

Between the Long Island Expressway and Jericho Turnpike, Commack Road is a four-lane undivided highway with sporadic residential frontage roads. Similar features were installed on parts of Larkfield Road and CR 11 (Pulaski Road).

North of NY 25, CR 4 becomes Townline Road. Though the first two sites consist of churches listed on the National Register of Historic Places, the rest of the area is standard residential suburbia. North of Dovecote Lane, Townline Road runs mostly along the border between the towns of Huntington and Smithtown. New York State Bicycle Route 25A is shared with CR 4 between Burr Road and Scholar Road.

The designation for CR 4 ends at the intersection at Clay Pitts Road in Commack, but the roadway continues northward towards NY 25A in Fort Salonga.

Major intersections

Location	mi	km	Destinations	Notes
North Babylon	0.00	0.00	NY 231 (Deer Park Avenue) to NY 27 / Southern State Parkway	Southern terminus
Deer Park	0.44	0.71	CR 57 (Bay Shore Road) – Bay Shore	
Deer Park	1.75	2.82	Long Island Avenue	Access to Deer Park station
Dix Hills	4.06	6.53	Fish Path	Access to Pilgrim Psychiatric Center
Commack	4.73	7.61	I-495 (Long Island Expressway) – New York, Riverhead	Exit 52 on I-495
Commack	5.51	8.87	CR 13 south (Crooked Hill Road) – Brentwood	Northern terminus of CR 13
Commack	5.61– 5.72	9.03– 9.21	CR 67 (Motor Parkway) / Northern State Parkway – New York, Dix Hills, Hauppauge	Exit 43 on Northern State Parkway
Commack	7.43	11.96	NY 25 (Jericho Turnpike) to NY 454 east / Sunken Meadow State Parkway	
Commack	9.30	14.97	Clay Pitts Road – Fort Salonga	Northern terminus
1.000 mi = 1.609 km; 1.000 km = 0.621 mi

== County Route 5 ==
County Route 5
- Location: Melville
- Length: 1.82 mi (2.93 km)

County Route 5 is a short industrial county route known as Ruland Road and Colonial Springs Road. It runs parallel to a former section of the original Long Island Motor Parkway, beginning at an intersection with New York State Route 110 in Melville and heading east. The road passes the headquarters of Newsday and the northern end of Long Island National Cemetery, before terminating just east of the intersection with Little East Neck Road North at the Melville–Wheatley Heights line.

The route was unsigned for much of its existence. As of January 2024, the route is once again signed.

Major intersections

Location	mi	km	Destinations	Notes
Melville	0.00	0.00	NY 110 (Broadhollow Road) – Amityville, Huntington	Western terminus
Melville	0.43	0.69	Republic Road (CR 28 south) – Republic Airport	
Melville	1.10	1.77	CR 3 (Pinelawn Road) – Lindenhurst	Access to Long Island National Cemetery
Melville–Wheatley Heights line	1.82	2.93	Colonial Springs Road	Continuation east
1.000 mi = 1.609 km; 1.000 km = 0.621 mi

== County Route 6 ==
County Route 6
- Location: Hauppauge
- Length: 0.86 mi (1,380 m)

County Route 6, known as Rabro Drive, serves the Hauppauge Industrial Park and the state and county government office buildings. The road begins at an intersection with County Route 108 and proceeds east to New York State Route 111, all within the hamlet of Hauppauge.

Major intersections

The entire route is in Hauppauge.

mi	km	Destinations	Notes
0.00	0.00	Old Willets Path (CR 108) to I-495 / NY 454	Western terminus
0.61	0.98	Simeon Woods Road (NY 901A)	Access to Suffolk County and New York State Offices
0.86	1.38	NY 111 (Wheeler Road) to I-495 – Smithtown, Central Islip	Eastern terminus
1.000 mi = 1.609 km; 1.000 km = 0.621 mi

== County Route 7 ==
County Route 7
- Location: Brentwood
- Length: 1.77 mi (2.85 km)

County Route 7, better known as Wicks Road, runs south to north from CR 13 to the Long Island Motor Parkway (at the former Long Island Expressway exit 54). The road is entirely in Brentwood.

The road was named for Francis Moses Asbury Wicks (1818–1867), a wealthy landowner and politician who owned the land in the vicinity of the former Thompson's (LIRR station), and later Pine Aire (LIRR station). His home, a large and rambling farmhouse, served as the railroad depot, inn, and general store.

Originally, Wicks Road ran further north than CR 67 onto part of what is today Moreland Road, across the Northern State Parkway to the west side of Hoyt's Farm Town Park, and as far north as NY 25.

Major intersections

The entire route is in Brentwood.

mi	km	Destinations	Notes
0.00	0.00	Crooked Hill Road / Wicks Road (CR 13) – Bay Shore	Southern terminus
1.08	1.74	Community College Drive (CR 106 west)	Access to Suffolk County Community College's Grant Campus and Brentwood State Park
1.63	2.62	To I-495 east – Riverhead	Interchange with eastbound service road
1.77	2.85	CR 67 (Motor Parkway) to I-495 west – New York	Northern terminus
1.000 mi = 1.609 km; 1.000 km = 0.621 mi

== County Route 8 ==
County Route 8
- Location: Yaphank–Middle Island

County Route 8 was reserved for the never-built Yaphank Bypass. It was intended to be a new four-lane road beginning at the vicinity of exit 66 of the Long Island Expressway, running west of the Carman's River and terminating at CR 21 near Bayliss (Bailey) Road.

== County Route 9 ==
County Route 9
- Location: Huntington–Elwood
- Length: 4.65 mi (7.48 km)
- Existed: 1936–present

County Route 9, known as Greenlawn Road and Cuba Hill Road, is an unsigned county road that runs through the town of Huntington. The road runs northwest to southeast, beginning as Greenlawn Road and crossing over the Long Island Rail Road as Cuba Hill Road. Its northern terminus is East Main Street (NY 25A) in Huntington, and it ends across from Burr Road at the intersection of Elwood Road (CR 10) in Elwood.

CR 9 serves BAE Systems Long Island, located at the corner of Cuba Hill Road and Pulaski Road (CR 11) in Greenlawn, and James H. Boyd Intermediate School. The section of CR 9 between Little Plains Road and the intersection with Elwood Road (CR 10) is part of New York State Bicycle Route 25A.

History

The Greenlawn Road portion of CR 9 was formerly CR 34 and was reassigned in 1930. The expansion of CR 9 led from the Long Island Rail Road tracks to CR 10, Elwood Road. This expansion, today, is known as Cuba Hill Road, and was added on December 26, 1936. CR 34 was appended onto CR 9 sometime after the 1960s. The road is currently unsigned; however, there were once signs that marked CR 9.

Major intersections

Location	mi	km	Destinations	Notes
Community of Huntington	0.00	0.00	NY 25A (East Main Street)	Western terminus
Greenlawn	2.38	3.83	CR 11 (Pulaski Road) – Huntington Station, East Northport	
Greenlawn	2.62	4.22	Broadway (CR 86)	Access to Greenlawn station
Elwood	4.65	7.48	Elwood Road (CR 10) – Northport, Commack	Eastern terminus
1.000 mi = 1.609 km; 1.000 km = 0.621 mi

== County Route 10 ==
County Route 10
- Location: Elwood–Northport
- Length: 3.95 mi (6.36 km)
- Existed: 1955–present

County Route 10, commonly referred to as Elwood Road, is a two-lane suburban county road. It runs from NY 25 in Elwood to NY 25A in Northport.

From the 1950s into the 1980s, there were proposals by the New York State Department of Transportation to build the Babylon–Northport Expressway within the vicinity of the west side of Elwood Road, with interchanges at both ends that included ramps utilizing CR 10. Suburban sprawl and public opposition to the roadway has resulted in the cancellation of the highway.

Major intersections

Location	mi	km	Destinations	Notes
Elwood	0.00	0.00	NY 25 (Jericho Turnpike) – South Huntington, Commack	Southern terminus
Elwood	0.56	0.90	Cuba Hill Road (CR 9 west) – Greenlawn	
East Northport	2.65	4.26	CR 11 (Pulaski Road) – Greenlawn, Kings Park	
Northport	3.95	6.36	NY 25A (Fort Salonga Road) – Huntington, Fort Salonga	Northern terminus
1.000 mi = 1.609 km; 1.000 km = 0.621 mi

== County Route 11 ==
County Route 11
- Location: Cold Spring Harbor–Kings Park
- Length: 11.21 mi (18.04 km)
- Existed: January 27, 1930–present

County Route 11, commonly referred to as Pulaski Road, runs west to east between Cold Spring Harbor and Kings Park. CR 11 provides the closest access to the Port Jefferson Branch of the Long Island Rail Road, since it runs roughly parallel to the tracks throughout its span in northwestern Suffolk County.

Location	mi	km	Destinations	Notes
Cold Spring Harbor	0.08	0.13	NY 108 (Harbor Road) – Woodbury, Cold Spring Harbor	Western terminus
Cold Spring Harbor	1.53	2.46	Oakwood Road (CR 92) – West Hills, Huntington	
Huntington Station	2.56	4.12	NY 110 (New York Avenue) – Huntington, Melville	
Huntington Station	3.81	6.13	CR 35 (Park Avenue) – Huntington, Dix Hills	
Greenlawn	5.10	8.21	CR 9 (Cuba Hill Road) – Huntington, Elwood	
Greenlawn	5.32	8.56	CR 86 (Broadway) – Centerport, Dix Hills	
East Northport	6.10	9.82	CR 10 (Elwood Road) – Northport, Dix Hills	
Kings Park	10.47	16.85	Sunken Meadow State Parkway – Kings Park, Commack	Exits SM4E and SM4W on Sunken Meadow Parkway
Kings Park	11.29	18.17	NY 25A (Fort Salonga Road) – Huntington, Smithtown	Eastern terminus
1.000 mi = 1.609 km; 1.000 km = 0.621 mi

== County Route 11A ==
County Route 11A
- Location: Greenlawn–East Northport

County Route 11A was a former suffixed extension of CR 11 assigned to Pulaski Road between CR 86 and CR 10 from January 26, 1931 to September 21, 1966

== County Route 11B ==
County Route 11B
- Location: Huntington Station–Greenlawn

County Route 11B was a former suffixed extension of CR 11 assigned to Pulaski Road between NY 110 and CR 86 from December 28, 1931 to September 21, 1966

== County Route 11C ==
County Route 11C
- Location: Cold Spring Harbor–Huntington Station

County Route 11C was a former suffixed extension of CR 11 assigned to Pulaski Road between NY 108 and NY 110 from November 27, 1933 to September 21, 1966

== County Route 12 ==
County Route 12
- Location: Amityville–West Babylon
- Length: 4.45 mi (7.16 km)
- Existed: 1959–present

County Route 12 runs west to east along Oak Street, Hoffman Avenue and Railroad Avenue, parallel to the Babylon Branch of the Long Island Rail Road. It begins at an intersection of CR 1 and Old Sunrise Highway (unsigned NY 900D) and ends at CR 96 at the village of Babylon line in West Babylon.

History

CR 12 was originally a suffixed extension of CR 50 until 1959.

Route description

At the intersection of CR 47, the elevated Copiague Station over the street is visible to the north. The station can also be seen from the next block at the intersection of an unnamed street leading to Railroad Avenue. The Babylon Branch finally runs along the north side of Oak Street between Garfield and Strong Avenues, where it crosses the Copiague–Lindenhurst village line.

In Lindenhurst, the name of CR 12 is changed to Hoffman Avenue. However, this name is also shared by a street running parallel to it on the north side of the Babylon Branch maintained by the village. East of the intersection with CR 3, the road passes in front of Lindenhurst Station, while the village of Lindenhurst's Hoffman Avenue runs behind it.

In West Babylon, CR 12's name is changed to South Railroad Avenue, a name it will hold onto upon crossing the border with the village of Babylon. At the border, which is at the intersection of CR 96, is the eastern terminus of CR 12. The roadway east of the terminus reaches NY 109, where it becomes Trolley Line Road, named for the former Babylon Railroad Company, which used the street as part of the route for its streetcar.

Major intersections

Location	mi	km	Destinations	Notes
Amityville	0.00	0.00	CR 1 (County Line Road) / Old Sunrise Highway (NY 900D west)	Western terminus
Amityville	0.39	0.63	NY 110 (Broadway) – Huntington, East Farmingdale	
Copiague	1.35	2.17	CR 47 (Great Neck Road) – Farmingdale, North Amityville	
Lindenhurst	2.80	4.51	Wellwood Avenue to CR 3 – Melville, North Lindenhurst	
West Babylon	4.45	7.16	Great East Neck Road (CR 96) – Bergen Point County Park	Eastern terminus; access to Babylon via Trolley Line Road
1.000 mi = 1.609 km; 1.000 km = 0.621 mi

== County Route 13 ==
County Route 13
- Location: Bay Shore–Commack
- Length: 7.50 mi (12.07 km)
- Existed: 1930–present

County Route 13 is a 7.50-mile (12.07 km) county road that runs north to south from CR 4 near Commack to NY 27A in Bay Shore which includes Fifth Avenue and Crooked Hill Road.. The road runs primarily east of Robert Moses Causeway and Sagtikos State Parkway, until it crosses over the Sagtikos Parkway in the vicinity of Pilgrim State Hospital. The route was added to the county highway system on April 28, 1930, and extensions were made on July 9, 1945.

Route description

CR 13 begins at NY 27A in Bay Shore. It heads northwest as the northbound one-way Fifth Avenue, part of a one-way couplet that includes the southbound-only North Clinton Avenue (CR 13A) one block to the west. They converge south of CR 57 (Howell's Road) itself located just south of NY 27. CR 13 moves over the main road and service roads of Sunrise Highway (NY 27), connecting to the highway by way of exit 43, a cloverleaf interchange. Continuing on, Fifth Avenue meets Brook Avenue, which leads to a shopping mall along Sunrise Highway before looping back to meet Third Avenue in Bay Shore.

Past Brook Avenue, the route takes on a more northerly routing as it heads into North Bay Shore and connects to the Heckscher State Parkway at exit 42. Farther north, CR 13 passes by the Entenmann's bakery factory prior to crossing the Main Line of the Long Island Rail Road and intersecting CR 100 (Suffolk Avenue) in Brentwood. The route's run as Fifth Avenue ends just north of CR 100 at a junction with CR 7 (Wicks Road), which continues north from the intersection on the routing established by Fifth Avenue. CR 13, meanwhile, forks to the northwest as Crooked Hill Road.

Not far from CR 7, the route serves both the Pilgrim State Psychiatric Center and Suffolk County Community College's Grant Campus and connects to the Sagtikos State Parkway at exit S2. Crooked Hill Road was originally southbound exit S1 on the Sagtikos Parkway. A traffic circle also existed at the southbound ramps to and from the parkway. When the nearby Long Island Expressway was constructed, the southbound off-ramp was eliminated, but the on-ramp was left intact. The reconstruction of the Long Island Expressway–Sagtikos Parkway interchange from 1988 to 1991 revived a southbound connection from the parkway to Crooked Hill Road via exit S1W. Today, and as always, Crooked Hill Road is also accessible from exit S2, which connect to roads within the grounds of the Pilgrim State Psychiatric Center, including unsigned CR 106 (Community College Drive).

The route continues on, descending Crooked Hill to reach the Long Island Expressway and its service roads. It crosses under the highway between exits 52 and 53, but has no ramps to or from the main road. Instead, the only access is to the service roads that lead to the expressway westbound and from the expressway eastbound. North of the expressway, CR 13 begins to head in a more north–northeasterly direction that takes it on a largely parallel routing to that of nearby CR 4 (Commack Road). CR 13 ends when the two roads finally converge just south of the Long Island Motor Parkway (CR 67) in Commack.

Major intersections

Location	mi	km	Destinations	Notes
Bay Shore	0.00	0.00	NY 27A (Montauk Highway)	Southern terminus; CR 13 begins one-way northbound
Bay Shore	0.31	0.50	CR 50 (Union Boulevard) – Brightwaters, Islip	Access to Bay Shore Station via CR 50 east; CR 13 is one-way northbound
Bay Shore	0.66	1.06	CR 13A south (Clinton Avenue)	Northern terminus of CR 13A; CR 13 becomes two-way
Bay Shore	0.92	1.48	CR 57 (Howells Road) – Deer Park	
Bay Shore	1.11	1.79	NY 27 (Sunrise Highway) – New York, Montauk	Cloverleaf interchange; exit 43 on NY 27
North Bay Shore	2.24	3.60	Heckscher State Parkway – New York, East Islip	Exits 42S-N on Heckscher State Parkway
Brentwood	4.26	6.86	CR 100 east (Suffolk Avenue) – Central Islip	Access to Brentwood Station
Brentwood	4.46	7.18	CR 7 north (Wicks Road)	No southbound exit; southern terminus of CR 7
Brentwood	5.64	9.08	CR 106 east (College Road) to Sagtikos State Parkway south – Pilgrim Psychiatric Center	Western terminus of CR 106; access to Suffolk County Community College
Brentwood	5.98	9.62	Sagtikos State Parkway north to I-495 – Kings Park	No entrance ramps; exit S2 on Sagtikos State Parkway
Commack	6.70	10.78	I-495 west (Long Island Expressway)	Exit 52 on I-495
Commack	7.50	12.07	CR 4 (Commack Road) to CR 67 (Vanderbilt Parkway) / Northern State Parkway – Fort Salonga, Deer Park	Northern terminus
1.000 mi = 1.609 km; 1.000 km = 0.621 mi: Incomplete access

== County Route 13A ==
County Route 13A
- Location: Bay Shore
- Length: 0.65 mi (1,050 m)
- Existed: 1967–present

County Route 13A is the southbound only segment of CR 13 in downtown Bay Shore. At the intersection of Reil Place all southbound traffic along CR 13 shifts to a parallel street called Clinton Avenue. This segment was designated CR 53 until May 22, 1967. North of this switch, Clinton Avenue runs parallel to Fifth Avenue as a two-way street, until the intersection with Joseph Avenue, only to be cut off by the interchange with Sunrise Highway. Both CR 13 and CR 13A cross the LIRR Montauk Branch and intersect with CR 50 (Union Boulevard) before terminating at NY 27A.

Major intersections

The entire route is in Bay Shore, and the junction list below runs from north to south.

mi	km	Destinations	Notes
0.00	0.00	CR 13 (Fifth Avenue)	Southbound traffic transitions from CR 13 south to CR 13A south
0.35	0.56	CR 50 (Union Boulevard) – Brightwaters, Islip	Access to Bay Shore Station via CR-50 east.
0.65	1.05	NY 27A (Main Street) / S. Clinton Avenue southbound – Fire Island Ferries	Access to Fire Island Ferries via NY-27A east; S. Clinton Avenue continues south without designation.
1.000 mi = 1.609 km; 1.000 km = 0.621 mi

== County Route 14 ==
County Route 14
- Location: Commack–Kings Park
- Length: 3.22 mi (5.18 km)
- Existed: 1930–present

County Route 14 is a county highway running south to north from NY 25 (Jericho Turnpike) in Commack to NY 25A in Kings Park. It runs parallel to the east of Sunken Meadow State Parkway. CR 14 ends at NY 25A near Kings Park Station, just two blocks east of CR 11. North of NY 25A, the road turns into Church Street, then Kohr Road, and runs along the east side of Sunken Meadow State Park until ending at Sunken Meadow Road. CR 14 was first added to the county highway system on January 27, 1930. A portion of former CR 2 (Straight Path) was added to CR 14 on June 22, 1961.

In 1978, New York State Department of Transportation built an interchange to-and-from the northbound lane of the Sunken Meadow State Parkway, in order to prevent accidents from motorists trying to cross NY 25 in order to get to CR 14 at exit SM3 E. This interchange was designated exit SM3A. West-to-northbound motorists from NY 25 use the on-ramp from this newer interchange to get to the parkway.

Major intersections

Location	mi	km	Destinations	Notes
Commack	0.00	0.00	NY 25 (Jericho Turnpike) / Sunken Meadow State Parkway south - Smithtown	Southern terminus; exit SM3E on Sunken Meadow Parkway
Commack	0.22	0.35	Sunken Meadow State Parkway north – Sunken Meadow State Park	Exit SM3A on Sunken Meadow Parkway
Commack	2.08	3.35	Old Northport Road – Fort Salonga, Smithtown	
Kings Park	3.22	5.18	NY 25A (East Main Street) – Northport, Fort Salonga, Smithtown	Northern terminus
1.000 mi = 1.609 km; 1.000 km = 0.621 mi

== County Route 15 ==
County Route 15
- Location: Smithtown
- Length: 1.35 mi (2.17 km)
- Existed: 1930–present

County Route 15, Maple Avenue, was an unsigned, 1.35-mile (2.17 km) county highway in Smithtown. The route began at an intersection with NY 111 to NY 25 and NY 25A (Main Street). CR 15 was added to the county highway system on January 27, 1930 and is no longer recognized by the Suffolk County Department of Public Works nor the New York State Department of Transportation.

Major intersections

The entire route was in the Community of Smithtown.

mi	km	Destinations	Notes
0.00	0.00	NY 111 – Hauppauge, Central Islip	
1.35	2.17	NY 25 / NY 25A (Main Street) – Commack, Village of the Branch, Centereach	
1.000 mi = 1.609 km; 1.000 km = 0.621 mi

== County Route 16 ==
County Route 16
- Location: Village of the Branch–Brookhaven
- Length: 15.90 mi (25.59 km)
- Existed: 1930–present

County Route 16 is a 15.90 miles (25.59 km) county-maintained highway stretching from NY 25 in Village of the Branch eastward to Montauk Highway (CR 80) in Brookhaven consisting of part of five roads: Terry Road, Smithtown Boulevard, Lake Shore Drive (formerly East Lake Terrace), Portion Road, and Horse Block Road. CR 16 has been in the Suffolk County highway system since January 27, 1930.

Though CR 16 has run consistently from the Town of Smithtown to the Town of Brookhaven since the mid-1960s, this was not always the case. Many segments have been part of other county roads. Lake Shore Drive and Portion Road used to be part of CR 19 from the Smithtown–Brookhaven town line to Waverly Avenue in Farmingville. In 1960, this terminus was moved to Patchogue–Holbrook Road. The construction of Sunrise Highway in 1957 lead to the realignment of Horseblock Road west of its original eastern terminus with South Country Road (former Montauk Highway) in South Haven. Because the interchange is shared with CR 21, the new alignment was originally designated as CR 21A. Horse Block Road used to be a western extension of CR 56 between Victory Avenue, a frontage road along Sunrise Highway that begins at CR 46, in Brookhaven and Waverly Avenue in Farmingville. In 1964, it was moved only to Victory Avenue.

== County Route 17 ==
County Route 17
- Location: East Islip–Hauppauge
- Length: 5.53 mi (8.90 km)
- Existed: 1966–present

County Route 17 is a 5.53-mile (8.90 km) county road located in western Suffolk County. The route runs south-to-north from NY 27A in East Islip to NY 111 in Hauppauge, just south of exit 56 on I-495 (the Long Island Expressway). Originally, CR 17 was an alignment of NY 111 (designated as State Highway 1208 internally). On September 13, 1966, the alignment was transferred from the state to Suffolk County and redesignated CR 17. The exit with the Heckscher State Parkway was added in the early 1990s.

Route description

The NY 111 designation was moved from Carleton Avenue to Islip Avenue, which runs parallel to Carleton Avenue between NY 27A and I-495, on September 13, 1966, in order to facilitate access to the Heckscher State Parkway. Evidence of County Road 17's former status as a State Highway can be found at the railroad bridge in Islip, which carries the Montauk Line of the Long Island Rail Road. Between then and the mid-to-late 1980s, CR 17 passed over the Heckscher State Parkway with no access, other than to nearby frontage roads that were used for residents. Exit 43A, linking CR 17 to the parkway, was built in the 1980s. Carleton Avenue also runs through the grounds of the former Central Islip Psychiatric Center. Nursing quarters were located on a frontage road along the west side of the street. The hospital was closed in 1990, and converted into a campus for the New York Institute of Technology. The road was widened to four lanes in the 1990s from Heckscher Parkway to the northern terminus of the former hospital grounds. North of the NYIT Campus, Carleton Avenue squeezes through downtown Central Islip. The former Central Islip railroad station was on the corner of the Main Line of the Long Island Rail Road just south of County Road 100 (Suffolk Avenue). A modernized station was built down the tracks on the corner of CR 100 and Lowell Avenue.

North of Suffolk Avenue, CR 17 moves northwest onto Wheeler's Road. This section kept its given name while NY 111 was renamed "Wheeler Road" in order to distinguish the state route from CR 17. From there, CR 17 crosses County Road 67 (the Long Island Motor Parkway) and encounters Bridge Road, a side road that mainly runs parallel to Motor Parkway for much of its run south of the Long Island Expressway. The northern terminus is at a fork in the road with NY 111 roughly 250 yards south of I-495. The NY 111/CR 17 intersection has quite a history. It was originally an at-grade interchange with an overhead expressway signpost holding two signs mounted on the corner that could be seen from the Long Island Expressway. The NY 111 shield was moved from one sign to the next in 1966, but the outline of the former NY 111 shield could still be seen on the original sign. Eventually, as the road was downgraded and the area developed, this sign came down. A Texaco gas station was built at the fork in the road in the mid-1970s. It was shortly converted into a Park and Ride for traffic from the Long Island Expressway.

Major intersections

Location	mi	km	Destinations	Notes
East Islip	0.00	0.00	NY 27A (Main Street)	Southern terminus; former NY 27
East Islip	0.25	0.40	CR 50 (Union Boulevard)	
East Islip–Islip Terrace line	0.80	1.29	To NY 27 – New York, Montauk	Access via local streets
Islip Terrace–Central Islip line	1.69– 1.88	2.72– 3.03	Heckscher State Parkway – New York, Heckscher State Park, D'Amato Federal Courthouse	Access via Spur Drive; exit 43A on Heckscher State Parkway
Central Islip	2.29	3.69	DPW Drive / Court House Drive	Access to Bethpage Ballpark, Cohalan Court Complex & Touro Law Center
Central Islip	4.15	6.68	CR 100 (Suffolk Avenue) – Brentwood, Islandia	Access to Central Islip Station
Central Islip	5.17	8.32	CR 67 (Long Island Motor Parkway)	
Hauppauge	5.53	8.90	NY 111 north to I-495 – Smithtown, New York, Riverhead	Northern terminus
1.000 mi = 1.609 km; 1.000 km = 0.621 mi

== County Route 18 ==
County Route 18
- Location: Sayville–Holbrook
- Length: 3.90 mi (6.28 km)
- Existed: 1930–present

County Route 18 is a 3.90-mile (6.28 km) county highway along Broadway Avenue from east of Sayville to Holbrook. It is an unsigned two-lane arterial spanning from Montauk Highway (CR 85) to CR 19 (Patchogue–Holbrook Road). A former segment of Broadway Avenue called "Old Broadway Avenue" runs east of the segment between Montauk Highway and somewhere south of Sunrise Highway along the border of Sans Soucci Lakes County Park and near a former Girl Scouts of the USA camp. The route was added to the Suffolk County highway system on January 27, 1930.

Major intersections

Location	mi	km	Destinations	Notes
Sayville	0.00	0.00	CR 85 (Montauk Highway) – Sayville, Bayport	Southern terminus; former NY 27A
Sayville	1.40	2.25	To NY 27 (Sunrise Highway) – New York, Montauk	Access via service roads
Holbrook	1.80	2.90	NY 454 (Veterans Memorial Highway) – MacArthur Airport	
Holbrook	3.80	6.12	Main Street – Downtown Holbrook	Former CR 19A
Holbrook	3.90	6.28	CR 19 (Patchogue–Holbrook Road) to I-495 – Lake Ronkonkoma, Patchogue	Northern terminus
1.000 mi = 1.609 km; 1.000 km = 0.621 mi

== County Route 19 ==
County Route 19
- Location: Patchogue–Lake Ronkonkoma
- Length: 6.76 mi (10.88 km)
- Existed: 1930–present

County Route 19 is a 6.76-mile (10.88 km) south–north arterial through central Suffolk County. The highway begins at an intersection with CR 65 in Patchogue. It connects several bedroom communities with major highways such as I-495 (the Long Island Expressway) and NY 27. CR 19 terminates at an intersection with CR 16 in Lake Ronkonkoma. The route was added to the Suffolk County highway system on January 27, 1930, and was amended on January 29, 1965.

Route description

The highway's southern terminus is at CR 65 (Division Street). It serves as a widened, upgraded version of local West Street, which continues south of Division Street toward the Great South Bay. The starting point of the highway is immediately to the west of the Long Island Rail Road's Patchogue station. The road heads north and crosses Montauk Highway just west of downtown Patchogue. The road then curves west as it forms the southern bank of Great Patchogue Lake. Curving north again after passing the lake, the road assumes the name of Waverly Avenue, a pre-existing road that extends south of CR 19 toward Montauk Highway. Still with four lanes, the road passes near Saint Joseph's College's Patchogue branch campus before crossing NY 27 (Sunrise Highway). The diamond interchange here was built between 1988 and 1991 when NY 27 was converted from an urban boulevard to a limited-access freeway, although it was originally planned as a cloverleaf interchange.

Leaving the Patchogue area, the road curves slightly left, as Waverly Avenue (unsigned CR 61) leaves CR 19 and continues its north–south route. Just to the north, CR 19 (now Patchogue–Holbrook Road) intersects two more partial-limited access highways. CR 99 (Woodside Avenue), which leads to the IRS center at Holtsville, has its terminus at CR 19 with a traffic signal. Less than a quarter mile to the north, CR 97 (Nicolls Road) passes overhead and has a diamond interchange with CR 19. Now entering Holbrook, the road divides various large bedroom communities. As it nears downtown Holbrook, the road moves onto a new alignment that was built between 1971 and 1973 to bypass the hamlet. After this bypass was built, the old section was renamed Main Street, eliminated between the new section and former CR 18 (Broadway Avenue) and designated CR 19A (now a former route). The new alignment carries four lanes up and over the Long Island Rail Road's Main Line, and was intended to have an interchange with Union Avenue and Main Street. Reassuming its former alignment, CR 19 then crosses the Long Island Expressway (I-495) with another diamond interchange. This interchange was the eastern terminus of the Long Island Expressway until 1971.

After the Long Island Expressway interchange, the highway narrows to just two lanes with center turn lane. The road again takes an S-curve to the west before heading north again. Halfway within this S-curve, CR 19 was originally intended to terminate at the never built "MacArthur Airport Expressway." The character of this northernmost portion of the road is quite different from the rest, as the road has a much lower speed limit and even passes through a school zone roughly a mile before the terminus at CR 16.

History

CR 19 originally included all of Waverly Avenue, including the portion designated as the unmarked CR 61. In 1965, it was realigned onto the new Patchogue-Holbrook Road. The road ran directly through "downtown" Holbrook until a realignment project taking place between 1971 and 1973.

Major intersections

Location	mi	km	Destinations	Notes
Patchogue	0.00	0.00	CR 65 west (Division Street)	Southern terminus; eastern terminus of CR 65; access to Patchogue Station
Patchogue	0.35	0.56	CR 85 west – Sayville, Shirley	Eastern terminus of CR 85; former NY 27A
North Patchogue	1.50	2.41	NY 27 (Sunrise Highway) – New York, Montauk	Exit 52 on NY 27
Holtsville	2.37	3.81	Waverly Avenue (CR 61 north) – Holtsville, Suff. Co. Comm. College	
Holtsville	2.69	4.33	CR 99 east (Woodside Avenue) – Brookhaven	Western terminus of CR 99
Holtsville	2.99	4.81	CR 97 (Nicolls Road) – Stony Brook, Blue Point	Diamond interchange
Holbrook	4.27	6.87	Broadway Avenue – Sayville	Former CR 18
Holbrook	4.52	7.27	CR 90 (Furrows Road) – Downtown Holbrook	Site of the formerly proposed Central Suffolk Highway
Holbrook	5.425	8.731	I-495 (Long Island Expressway) – New York, Riverhead, Park & Ride	Exit 61 on I-495
Lake Ronkonkoma	6.76	10.88	CR 16 (Portion Road) – Smithtown, Farmingville	Northern terminus
1.000 mi = 1.609 km; 1.000 km = 0.621 mi

== County Route 19A ==
County Route 19A
- Location: Holbrook
- Length: 0.9 mi (1,400 m)

County Route 19A was a 0.9-mile (1.4 km) former segment of CR 19 in Holbrook. When Patchogue–Holbrook Road was realigned, this section was named Main Street. The old alignment goes "around" Holbrook, which was realigned to carry four lanes up and over the Long Island Rail Road's Main Line, which was intended to have an interchange with Union Avenue and Main Street.

Major intersections

The entire route is in Holbrook.

mi	km	Destinations	Notes
0.00	0.00	Broadway Avenue to CR 19 – Patchogue, Sayville	Former CR 18; Access to CR-19 via Broadway Avenue north.
0.30	0.48	CR 90 (Furrows Road)	Site of the formerly proposed Central Suffolk Highway.
0.86	1.38	Union Avenue to – Ronkonkoma, Holtsville	Access to Ronkonkoma LIRR Station via Union Avenue west.
0.90	1.45	CR 19 to I-495 – Lake Ronkonkoma	Access to I-495 via CR-19 north.
1.000 mi = 1.609 km; 1.000 km = 0.621 mi

== County Route 20 ==
County Route 20
- Location: Port Jefferson–Sound Beach
- Length: 6.30 mi (10.14 km)
- Existed: 1930–present

County Route 20 was the unsigned designation for a 6.60 miles (10.62 km) portion of North Country Road from NY 25A in Port Jefferson, just north of the railroad station, to an intersection with NY 25A in Sound Beach. CR 20 was added to the county highway system on January 27, 1930. Until the 1980s, it also included Sheep Pasture Road and Lower Sheep Pasture Road from Stony Brook to Port Jefferson.

CR 20 was shared with New York State Bicycle Route 25 east of Belle Terre Road in Port Jefferson, and ran through most of the Miller Place Historic District.

Sheep Pasture Road

Sheep Pasture Road is an alternate route in East Setauket connecting Stony Brook to Port Jefferson Station. For a small section it is broken up into Upper Sheep Pasture Road and Lower Sheep Pasture Road. Its name at one time meant that there were sheep and pastures around in abundance but currently it is a heavily travelled artery and is almost all residential.

Major intersections

Location	mi	km	Destinations	Notes
Port Jefferson	0.0	0.0	NY 25A (Main Street) / Sheep Pasture Road west – Port Jefferson Station	CR 20 formerly continued west; Access to Port Jefferson railroad station via NY-25A east.
Mt. Sinai	2.1	3.4	Mt. Sinai-Coram Road – Coram	
Miller Place	2.9	4.7	Pipe Stave Hollow Road north - Cedar Beach	
Miller Place	4.0	6.4	Lower Rocky Point Road east	
Miller Place	4.6	7.4	Miller Place Road south – Middle Island, Coram	No access from North Country Road west to Miller Place Road.
Miller Place	4.9	7.9	Echo Avenue – Sound Beach	
Sound Beach	6.30	10.14	NY 25A – Rocky Point, Wading River	
1.000 mi = 1.609 km; 1.000 km = 0.621 mi: Incomplete access

== County Route 21 ==
County Route 21
- Location: Brookhaven–Rocky Point
- Length: 11.70 mi (18.83 km)
- Existed: 1930–present

County Route 21 is a two-lane, 11.70-mile (18.83 km) highway running from Brookhaven to Rocky Point. Its southern terminus is at CR 80 south of the interchange between CR 16 and NY 27 (which includes Yaphank Avenue in the interchange) in Brookhaven. The highway heads northward and terminates at an intersection with NY 25A in Rocky Point. CR 21 was added to the Suffolk County highway system on January 27, 1930.

Route description

CR 21 ends at CR 80 (Montauk Highway), although this portion of the road was severed when Sunrise Highway was built. For all intents and purposes as an uninterrupted route, CR 21 ends at CR 16 (Horseblock Road) in Yaphank. The road continues through Yaphank, a formerly agrarian area that has been built up by Suffolk County into a government office center, which includes the Suffolk County Police Department headquarters, and one of the main county jails. In conjunction with the development of this zone, CR 21 was widened in the mid-1970s. This project included a bridge over the Long Island Rail Road Main Line as well as some local streets, one of which leads directly to Yaphank Station. North of the tracks, the Suffolk County Almshouse Barn can be found west of the road, as well as the former Suffolk County Sanitorium, and other county government buildings. In this area, CR 21 also crosses I-495, which was built through the existing road in the late 1960s. The interchange here was not finished until 2000, when a westbound on-ramp and an eastbound off-ramp were added.

North of the Long Island Expressway, Yaphank Avenue runs on top of the dam for Lower Yaphank Lake before its terminus at East Main Street. Here the historic Homan-Gerard House and Mills can be found on the southeast corner, while the former Yaphank Garage can be found on the southwest corner. CR 21 makes a left turn at the intersection and proceeds through historic Yaphank. East Main Street leads to another historic Long Island road named Moriches–Middle Island Road, which took residents between Rocky Point and The Moricheses long before the automobile was invented, let alone the Suffolk County Highway System. Near Upper Yaphank Lake, CR 21 intersects with West Main Street, at one of two former Yaphank triangles (the other being at Mill Road and Patchogue–Yaphank Road). At this point, CR 21 resumes its northward heading. Also at this point, a former section of the road is visible on land now owned by the Suffolk County Parks Department. It is visible diagonally across the street from and north of a building formerly owned by New York Telephone.

CR 21 meanders through a variety of landscapes as it heads north to Middle Island, including farmland and forest. It passes close to the Carman's River at this point, particularly in the area of Cathedral Pines County Park. This area was notorious as one of the most deadly stretches of the road until safety improvements realigned and modernized the roadway near East Bartlett Road and again north of Longwood Road. Another former section of road called Old Middle Island–Yaphank Road breaks off to the left near CR 21's intersection with NY 25. North of NY 25, the name of the road changes from Yaphank–Middle Island Road to Rocky Point–Yaphank Road. The former alignment of the road continues roughly parallel to the newer road, rejoining it near the intersection of Bayliss Road (also known as Bailey Road). Additionally, a former meander in the road is visible on either side of CR 21 just south of Whiskey Road.

Between Middle Island and Rocky Point, much of CR 21 runs through the Rocky Point Natural Resources Management Area, a major conservation area on land once owned by the Radio Corporation of America. This land was once considered the world's largest radio transmitting field. Here, the road is given a second name of Marconi Boulevard. North of the former RCA Labs, CR 21 runs between a high school and a housing project, before terminating at NY 25A. North of NY 25A, the road turns into Hallock Landing Road as it heads towards the bluffs of the Long Island Sound.

History

CR 21 was added to the Suffolk County highway system on January 27, 1930, on various roads dating back to colonial times. A widening project took place along Yaphank Avenue during the 1970s but various realignments took place along Yaphank–Middle Island Road, and Rocky Point–Yaphank Road before then. Though CR 21 runs almost the entire breadth of Central Long Island, it does not intersect many major highways. Due to steep public opposition to highway improvements, there are multiple proposed and never-built highways that would have intersected this road:

- CR 99 was supposed to be extended east of CR 16 terminating at an interchange with CR 21.
- CR 90 was supposed to have an interchange with Yaphank Avenue near the Suffolk County Police Department Headquarters. This was to be part of the proposed Central Suffolk Highway designed to reconnect the two broken ends of NY 24.
- CR 102 was a proposed upgrade of East Main Street east of CR 21. The new highway would have extended to exit 68 on the Long Island Expressway and William Floyd Parkway.
- CR 101 was either supposed to cross over Lower Yaphank Lake and East Main Street or at the east triangle with West Main Street and Middle Island–Yaphank Road. Both proposed extensions were to lead to William Floyd Parkway between Parr Meadows and Longwood Road.
- CR 24 was supposed to be upgraded to an extension between East Bartlett Road and Longwood Road.
- CR 8, the formerly proposed Yaphank Bypass, was supposed to terminate between Bayliss Road (also known as Bailey Road) and Miller Place–Yaphank Road.
- CR 111 was supposed to have an interchange at the intersection of Whiskey Road.
- CR 26 was supposed to have an interchange at the north end of the Rocky Point Natural Resources Management Area. It was intended to be relocated from the North Fork and upgraded as part of NY 347.

With the construction of exit 57 along Sunrise Highway, which interrupted original sections of both Horseblock Road and Yaphank Avenue, the new section of Horseblock Road was originally designated CR 21A. This designation was eventually integrated into part of CR 16.

Major intersections

Location	mi	km	Destinations	Notes
Brookhaven	0.00	0.00	CR 80 (Montauk Highway) – Patchogue, Bellport, Shirley	Former NY 27A
Brookhaven	0.31	0.50	NY 27 east	Entrance only
Gap in route; connection made via CR 80 and CR 16
Yaphank	0.31	0.50	NY 27 west – New York	
Yaphank	0.50	0.80	NY 27 east / CR 16 (Horseblock Road) / CR 56 east (Victory Avenue) – New York, Smithtown	
Yaphank	2.85	4.59	I-495 – New York, Riverhead	Exit 67 on I-495; diamond interchange fully completed in 2000
Yaphank	3.11	5.01	Main Street	Former CR 102
Middle Island	5.86	9.43	Longwood Road	Former CR 24
Middle Island	7.25	11.67	NY 25 (Middle County Road)	
Rocky Point	11.70	18.83	NY 25A	
1.000 mi = 1.609 km; 1.000 km = 0.621 mi: Incomplete access

== County Route 21A ==
County Route 21A
- Location: South Haven

County Route 21A was a suffixed alternate of CR 21 created during the construction of exit 57 along Sunrise Highway, which interrupted original sections of both Horse Block Road and Yaphank Avenue, The new section was officially part of Horse Block Road, but was eventually deleted, when it was integrated into part of CR 16.

== County Route 22 ==
County Route 22
- Location: Jamesport–Northville
- Length: 2.45 mi (3.94 km)
- Existed: 1930–present

County Route 22 was an unsigned, 2.45-mile (3.94 km) north–south county highway known as Manor Lane. The designation ran from NY 25 in the community of Jamesport to an intersection with Sound Avenue, a former alignment of NY 25A, in Northville, just east of now former CR 23. CR 22 began in the Suffolk County highway system since January 27, 1930.

Major intersections

Location	mi	km	Destinations	Notes
Jamesport	0.00	0.00	NY 25 (Main Road)	
Northville	2.45	3.94	Sound Avenue	Former alignment of NY 25A
1.000 mi = 1.609 km; 1.000 km = 0.621 mi

== County Route 23 ==
County Route 23
- Location: Aquebogue–Northville
- Length: 1.75 mi (2.82 km)
- Existed: 1930–present

County Route 23 was an unsigned, 1.75-mile (2.82 km) north–south county highway. CR 23, designated Church Lane, began at an intersection with NY 25 (Main Road) in Aquebogue and terminated at an intersection with Sound Avenue in Northville. CR 23 was added to the county highway system on January 27, 1930, and is no longer recognized by either SCDPW or NYSDOT.

Major intersections

Location	mi	km	Destinations	Notes
Aquebogue	0.00	0.00	NY 25	
Northville	1.75	2.82	Sound Avenue	Former alignment of NY 25A
1.000 mi = 1.609 km; 1.000 km = 0.621 mi

== County Route 24 ==
County Route 24
- Location: Middle Island–Upton
- Length: 1.9 mi (3.1 km)
- Existed: 1975–present

County Route 24 was an unsigned county highway extending from CR 21 (Yaphank–Middle Island Road) in the community of Middle Island to CR 46 (William Floyd Parkway) in Upton. CR 24, designated Longwood Road, also served Cathedral Pines County Park at its western terminus. The route, which was originally named South Manor Road, was added to the county highway system for Suffolk County on March 25, 1975. The route is no longer recognized by the Suffolk County Department of Public Works and the New York State Department of Transportation.

Major intersections

Location	mi	km	Destinations	Notes
Middle Island	0.00	0.00	CR 21 (Yaphank–Middle Island Road)	
Upton	1.90	3.06	CR 46 (William Floyd Parkway) / Princeton Avenue	Continues east to Brookhaven National Laboratory
1.000 mi = 1.609 km; 1.000 km = 0.621 mi

== County Route 25 ==
County Route 25
- Location: Center Moriches–Wading River
- Length: 11.05 mi (17.78 km)

County Route 25 was an 11.05-mile (17.78 km) north–south two-lane highway running from Center Moriches to Wading River. CR 25 went from the Montauk Highway in Center Moriches to an intersection with NY 25A in the community of Riverhead. The highway was designated on May 1, 1968, from former CR 66 along Brookfield Avenue, Wading River Road and Schultz Road. During the 1970s, the highway was to receive widening and realignment projects west of the existing Wading River Road. The projects were to stretch from exit 69 on the Long Island Expressway (I-495) southward to the Montauk Highway and the western terminus of the Moriches Bypass, designated CR 98. The new section of the road was never built, and the CR 25 designation was eventually removed.
