= National Register of Historic Places listings in Babylon, New York =

The following properties in the Town of Babylon, New York, are listed in the National Register of Historic Places. The locations of National Register properties for which the latitude and longitude coordinates are included below, may be seen in a Google map.

== Listings ==
	Name on the Register	Image	Date listed	Location	City or town	Description
1	The Babylon Library	The Babylon Library	August 10, 2015 (#15000517)	117 W. Main St. 40°41′46″N 73°19′31″W	Babylon	Neoclassical 1911 building was part of early wave of public libraries built in small towns across the country during the first decades of the 20th century. More info here.
2	Babylon Town Hall	Babylon Town Hall	October 5, 2005 (#05001131)	47 West Main Street; 40°41′47″N 73°19′27″W	Babylon	
3	Long Island National Cemetery	Long Island National Cemetery	March 22, 2016 (#16000113)	2040 Wellwood Ave., 40°45′27″N 73°23′48″W	Wyandanch	Veterans' cemetery shared with town of Huntington to north built in 1930s to handle overflow from Cypress Hills soon expanded to take in 10,000 World War II veterans and POWs.
4	Nathaniel Conklin House	Nathaniel Conklin House	December 8, 1988 (#88002683)	280 Deer Park Avenue; 40°42′02″N 73°19′23″W	Babylon	
5	Sisters of St. Dominic Motherhouse Complex	Sisters of St. Dominic Motherhouse Complex	June 27, 2007 (#07000625)	555 Albany Avenue; 40°42′18″N 73°24′14″W	North Amityville	
6	Frank W. Smith House	Frank W. Smith House	September 24, 2010 (#10000797)	43 Barberry Court; 40°40′27″N 73°24′42″W	Amityville	

== See also ==
- National Register of Historic Places listings in New York
- National Register of Historic Places listings in Suffolk County, New York
