= Walter G. O'Connell Copiague High School =

Location
- 1100 Dixon Avenue; Copiague, New York, (Suffolk County) 11726; United States; 40.6884°N 73.39625°W

Information
- School type: Public school
- Opened: 1957, first graduating class, 1960. The current school building was opened in 1968.
- Founder: Walter G. O'Connell
- School district: Copiague Union Free School District
- NCES School ID: 360831000609
- Principal: Joseph Agosta
- Faculty: 131
- Teaching staff: 113.44 (FTE)
- Grades: 9–12
- Enrollment: 1,586 (2023-2024)
- Hours in school day: approx. 6 1/2
- Colors: Royal blue and white
- Athletics conference: Section 11, Division II League
- Mascot: Eagle
- Team name: Copiague Eagles
- Website: www.copiague.k12.ny.us/28801_3

Walter G. O'Connell Copiague High School is an American four-year college preparatory public high school in the hamlet of Copiague in Suffolk County, New York. Commonly referred to as "Copiague High School," the school is named after its founder and first principal Walter G. O'Connell. It is a part of the Copiague Union Free School District.

Walter G. O'Connell Copiague High School serves approximately 1,545 students in grades nine through twelve.

The school district which operates this school is in the Town of Babylon, and includes most of Copiague, the eastern portion of North Amityville, and small portions of East Farmingdale and North Lindenhurst.

== Athletics ==
Copiague High School's interscholastic athletics program offers its students the option of choosing from a wide range of sports throughout the school year. Teams compete in the Section 11, Division II League in both the junior and senior varsity levels.

Some of the sports available include:

FALL Football (V) Girls Soccer (V/JV) Girls Tennis (V/JV) Boys Cross-Country (V) Girls Volleyball (V/JV) Cheerleading (V/JV) Field Hockey (V/JV) Gymnastics (V)	WINTER Wrestling (V/JV) Boys Basketball (V/JV) Girls Basketball (V/JV) Boys Winter Track (V) Girls Winter Track (V) Boys Bowling (V) Girls Bowling (V) Cheerleading (V/JV)	SPRING Softball (V/JV) Baseball (V/JV) Boys Lacrosse (V/JV) Girls Lacrosse (V/JV) Boys Tennis (JV) Boys Spring Track (V) Girls Spring Track (V)
