= Copiague Union Free School District =

School district in New York, United States

Location
- Copiague, Suffolk County, New York; United States

District information
- Motto: A Great Place to Learn
- Grades: K-12
- Superintendent: Dr. Kathleen Bannon
- Deputy superintendent(s): Karla Cangelosi
- Schools: 6

Students and staff
- Students: 4,862
- District mascot: Eagles
- Colors: Blue and white

Other information
- District Offices: Copiague Middle School 2650 Great Neck Road Copiague, New York
- Website: copiague.k12.ny.us

Copiague Union Free School District, also known as Copiague Public Schools, is a school district headquartered in Copiague, New York.

The district, in the Town of Babylon, Suffolk County on the South Shore of Long Island, includes most of Copiague, the eastern portion of North Amityville, and small portions of East Farmingdale and North Lindenhurst.

== History ==
In 1955 a three-member board consisting of Donald E. Muncy, the Town of Babylon Supervisor; John P. McGuire, the Supervisory School Superintendent; and Rowland Scott, the Babylon Town Clerk, reassigned a part of the Copiague district to the Amityville Union Free School District. The Copiague district planned to file an appeal with the New York State government. A previous plan would have involved a piece of Amityville being in the Copiague district, and some residents wanted to, in return, ask for seceding from Amityville.

In 2022, the district's enrollment count was 5,000.

== Schools ==
Secondary schools

- Walter G. O'Connell Copiague High School
- Copiague Middle School

Elementary schools

- Deauville Gardens East Elementary School
- Deauville Gardens West Elementary School
- Great Neck Road Elementary School
- Susan E. Wiley Elementary School
