= O'Connell High School =

O'Connell High School may refer to:

- Bishop Denis J. O'Connell High School — Arlington County, Virginia
- John A. O'Connell High School of Technology — San Francisco, California
- Walter G. O'Connell Copiague High School — Copiague, New York
- O'Connell College Preparatory School — Galveston, Texas
