= Conklin House =

Conklin House may refer to:

- Conklin-Montgomery House, Cambridge City, IN, listed on the National Register of Historic Places (NRHP) in Indiana
- Nathaniel Conklin House, Babylon, New York, NRHP-listed
- Conklin, David Conklin House, Cold Spring Harbor, New York, listed on the NRHP in New York
- Conklin Farm, Hounsfield, New York, NRHP-listed
- Conklin Mountain House, Olean, New York, NRHP-listed
- Conklin House (Chandler, Oklahoma), NRHP-listed
