= Tartamella =

Tartamella is a surname. Notable people with the surname include:

- Joe Tartamella (born 1980), American college basketball coach
- John Tartamella (1892–1966), American mobster
- Travis Tartamella (born 1987), American baseball catcher
