= Amityville Union Free School District =

School district in New York, United States

Location
- Amityville, Suffolk County, New York; United States

District information
- Motto: Changing Mindsets Together
- Grades: PK-12
- President: Lisa Johnson
- Superintendent: Dr. Gina Talbert
- Schools: 5

Students and staff
- Students: 2,926
- Student–teacher ratio: 9.88 to 1
- District mascot: Tide
- Colors: Red, grey, and white

Other information
- District Offices: 150 Park Avenue Amityville, NY 11701
- Website: www.amityvilleschools.org/42492_1

Amityville Union Free School District is a public school district headquartered in Amityville, New York on the South Shore of Long Island.

In Suffolk County, the district includes the Village of Amityville and parts of the hamlets of Copiague and North Amityville. It also covers a portion of the hamlet of East Massapequa in Nassau County. Part of the district is in the Town of Babylon in Suffolk County and part is in the Town of Oyster Bay in Nassau County.

== History ==
In 1955 a three member board consisting of Babylon Town Supervisor Donald E. Muncy, Huntington District Supervisory School Superintendent John P. McGuire, and Babylon Town Clerk Rowland Scott reassigned a part of the Copiague Union Free School District to the Amityville UFSD. The Copiague UFSD planned to file an appeal with the New York State government. A previous plan would have involved a piece of Amityville being in the Copiague UFSD, and some residents wanted to, in return, ask for seceding from Amityville.

In 1998, the school district began sorting elementary school students into classes by standardized test results. That same year, the NAACP and the teachers' union stated that they wished to file a lawsuit in an attempt to stop this practice. Circa 2000, the lawsuit was filed in federal district court. In 2000, jury selection was in progress for the case.

The New York State Comptroller's office had, in the 2020s, labeled the district as being in "significant" financial strain. In 2025 the office of the comptroller's office had reduced that label to "moderate".

== Demographics ==
As of the 2010–2011 school year, the Amityville Union Free School District had 2,780 students. The racial demographics were 0% American Indian or Alaska Native, 54% non-Hispanic black or African-American, 35% Hispanic or Latino, 1% Asian or Native Hawaiian/Other Pacific Islander, 8% non-Hispanic white, and 2% multiracial. 51% of students were eligible for free lunch, 10% for reduced-price lunch and 11% of students were Limited English Proficient. 16.5% of students were classified as "Special Ed".

The school district had a graduation rate of 79% and 2% of students did not complete school. 87% of graduates received a Regents Diploma and 31% received a Regents Diploma with Advanced Designation. Of the 2011 completers, 35% planned to move on to 4-year College, 52% to 2-year College, 4% to Other Post-Secondary, 3% to the Military, 5% to Employment, 1% to Adult Services, 0% had other known post-secondary plans, and 1% had no known post-secondary plan.

== Athletics ==
Previously the school mascot used the "Warriors" as its athletic mascot. Ben Dickson of Newsday stated that the district was "long associated with its Warriors moniker".

New York State ended the use of Native American mascots in schools in the state. In 2024 the district leadership attempted to keep the "Warriors" mascot and sought permission from the New York State Board of Regents to retain such via a lawsuit. In April 2025 the district chose a new mascot, the "hawks". However, in June, the school board instead adopted "The Tide" as the mascot, replacing the hawks.

== Schools ==
- Amityville Memorial High School (Grades 9-12)
- Edmund W. Miles Middle School (6-8)
- Park Avenue Memorial Elementary School (3-5)
- Northeast School (Pre-K and Kindergarten)
  - In 2024, the closure of the school had been proposed.
- Northwest Elementary School (Kindergarten - Grade 2)

For the 2011–2012 school year, the Accountability Status for Northeast and Northwest Elementary Schools and the high school was "In Good Standing", while Park Avenue Memorial Elementary School was "In Need of Correction Action (year 2) Focused" and the middle school was "In Need of Restructuring (year 1) Comprehensive". The Accountability Status for the district overall was "In Good Standing"

Until recently, Amityville Memorial High School served grades 9–12, Edmund W. Miles Middle School served grades 6–8, Park Avenue Memorial Elementary School served grades 3–5, and Northwest Elementary School served grades 1–2. The first part of the change was implemented at the start of the 2009–2010 school year when new 9th graders were kept at Edmund W. Miles Middle School and new 6th graders were kept at Park Avenue Memorial Elementary School. At the start of the 2012–2013 school year, new 3rd graders were kept at Northwest Elementary School.

== See also ==
- Cold Spring Harbor Central School District
- Copiague Union Free School District
