= Copiague Harbor, New York =

Copiague Harbor, New York Great Neck Landing
- Incorporated community
- Location within the state of New York
- Coordinates: 40°39′40″N 73°23′5″W
- Country: United States
- State: New York
- County: Suffolk
- Town: Babylon
- Time zone: UTC-5 (Eastern (EST))
  - Summer (DST): UTC-4 (EDT)
- Website: copiagueharbor.com/default.php

Copiague Harbor (/koʊˈpeɪɡ/ koh-PAYG) is an affluent incorporated community within the census-designated place (CDP) of Copiague. It is located south of Merrick Road (or Montauk Highway), off of South Great Neck Road in Suffolk County, New York, USA, on the South Shore of Long Island. It is sometimes referred to as Great Neck Landing.

== Description ==
Copiague Harbor is a small community located on a southern peninsula of Copiague, primarily composed of larger size homes deeded belonging to a homeowners' association, Great South Bay Estates Homeowner's Association (GSBEHA). The community offers amenities including a mini-beach and mini-marina on a private lagoon.

It was developed in the 1960s intended as a private community, gated and guarded. From time to time residents have considered adding a gate and guard as originally intended.

== Geography ==
Copiague Harbor is located at the southernmost part of the hamlet of Copiague. It borders the Great South Bay.

== Education ==
=== School District ===
Copiague Harbor is located within the boundaries of (and is thus served by) the Copiague Union Free School District. As such, all children who reside within Copiague Harbor and attend public schools attend Copiague's schools.

=== Library District ===
Copiague Harbor is located within the boundaries of (and is thus served by) the Copiague Library District.
