= Copiague, New York =

- Hamlet and Census-designated place
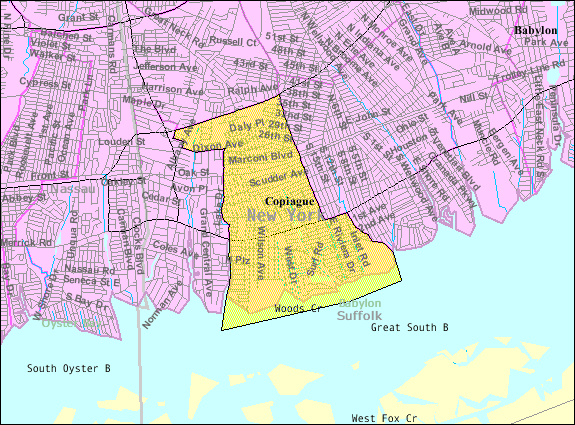
- U.S. Census map

- Location on Long Island Location within the state of New York
- Coordinates: 40°40′29″N 73°23′36″W
- Country: United States
- State: New York
- County: Suffolk
- Town: Babylon

Area
  - Total: 3.71 sq mi (9.61 km^{2})
  - Land: 3.09 sq mi (8.01 km^{2})
  - Water: 0.62 sq mi (1.60 km^{2})
- Elevation: 23 ft (7 m)

Population (2020)
  - Total: 23,429
  - Density: 7,577/sq mi (2,925.4/km^{2})
- Time zone: UTC-5 (Eastern (EST))
  - Summer (DST): UTC-4 (EDT)
- ZIP code: 11726
- Area codes: 631, 934
- FIPS code: 36-18146
- GNIS feature ID: 0947414

Copiague (/ˈkoʊpeɪɡ/ KOH-payg) is a hamlet on Long Island (and census-designated place) in the Town of Babylon, in Suffolk County, New York, United States. The population was 23,429 at the time of the 2020 census.

== Geography ==
According to the United States Census Bureau, the CDP has a total area of 3.2 square miles (8.4 km^{2}), of which 3.2 square miles (8.3 km^{2}) is land and 0.04 square miles (0.1 km^{2}), or 0.88%, is water.

Copiague is approximately 35 miles (56 km) east of Manhattan and 70 miles (110 km) west of Montauk Point. It is bordered by Amityville to the west, North Amityville to the north, Lindenhurst to the east, and the Great South Bay to the south.

South of Montauk Highway (Merrick Road), Copiague is divided into three major peninsulas:

- The southwestern peninsula is known as Amity Harbor and is served by the Amityville Post Office and uses the 11701 Zip code.
- The central peninsula is known as Copiague Harbor and is served by the Copiague Post Office.
- The southeastern peninsula is known as American Venice and is served by the Lindenhurst Post Office and uses the 11757 Zip code.

== Demographics ==
Historical population
Census	Pop.	Note	%±
2010	23,429		—
2020	23,429		0.0%
U.S. Decennial Census

=== 2020 census ===
As of the 2020 census, Copiague had a population of 23,429. The median age was 40.6 years. 19.8% of residents were under the age of 18 and 15.4% of residents were 65 years of age or older. For every 100 females there were 95.5 males, and for every 100 females age 18 and over there were 94.5 males age 18 and over.

100.0% of residents lived in urban areas, while 0.0% lived in rural areas.

There were 7,684 households in Copiague, of which 32.3% had children under the age of 18 living in them. Of all households, 45.6% were married-couple households, 18.5% were households with a male householder and no spouse or partner present, and 28.6% were households with a female householder and no spouse or partner present. About 23.0% of all households were made up of individuals and 10.0% had someone living alone who was 65 years of age or older.

There were 8,024 housing units, of which 4.2% were vacant. The homeowner vacancy rate was 1.6% and the rental vacancy rate was 2.9%.

Racial composition as of the 2020 census
Race	Number	Percent
White	11,971	51.1%
Black or African American	1,992	8.5%
American Indian and Alaska Native	137	0.6%
Asian	555	2.4%
Native Hawaiian and Other Pacific Islander	5	0.0%
Some other race	5,692	24.3%
Two or more races	3,077	13.1%
Hispanic or Latino (of any race)	9,634	41.1%

=== 2010 census ===
As of the 2010 census, there were 23,429 people and 6,942 households, with 3.33 persons per household. The population density was 7,144.3 inhabitants per square mile (2,758.4/km^{2}).

There were 7,919 housing units, of which 82.0% were owner-occupied. 4.8% of housing units were vacant and 28.0% of occupied housing units were occupied by renters.

The racial makeup of the CDP was 97.1% White, 1.9% African American, 0.1% Native American, 0.0% Asian, 0.0% Pacific Islander, 0.0% some other race, and 0.0% from two or more races. Hispanic or Latino of any race were 32.7% of the population.

There were 7,535 households, out of which 29.2% had children under the age of 18 living with them, 49.2% were headed by married couples living together, 14.9% had a female householder with no husband present, and 28.4% were non-families. 21.4% of all households were made up of individuals, and 8.9% were someone living alone who was 65 years of age or older. The average household size was 3.04 and the average family size was 3.44.

In the CDP, the population was spread out, with 21.2% under the age of 18, 9.2% from 18 to 24, 29.6% from 25 to 44, 28.1% from 45 to 64, and 11.7% who were 65 years of age or older. The median age was 38.4 years.

=== 2009–2011 American Community Survey estimates ===
For the period 2009–2011, it was estimated that 94.9% of the population had lived in the same house 1 year and over. 29.2% of the population were foreign-born, and 34.8% of residents at least 5 years old spoke a language other than English at home.

Between 2009 and 2011, 84.9% of residents at least 25 years old had graduated from high school, and 20.9% of residents at least 25 years old had a bachelor's degree or higher. The mean travel time to work for workers aged 16 and over was 25.1 minutes.

For the period 2009–2011, the median annual income for a household in the CDP was $74,065. The per capita income for the CDP was $29,768. 7.8% of the population were below the poverty line.

== Education ==
Most of Copiague is served by the Copiague Union Free School District, which also serves parts of North Amityville, a small portion of North Lindenhurst, and a very small portion of East Farmingdale. However, a portion of Copiague, west of Bayview Avenue and north of Dixon Avenue, is in the Amityville Union Free School District.

As of the 2010–2011 school year, the Copiague Union Free School District had 4,720 students.

The district operates six schools:

- Four elementary schools (Grades K–5):

Deauville Gardens East, Deauville Gardens West, Great Neck Road, and Susan E. Wiley

- One middle school (Grades 6–8): Copiague Middle School
- One high school (Grades 9–12): Walter G. O'Connell Copiague High School

== Emergency services ==
Founded in 1928, the Copiague Volunteer Fire Department is the sole provider of fire and rescue services for the hamlet of Copiague. Three fire companies and two emergency squads are dispatched by the Town of Babylon Central Fire Alarm dispatch center out of two fire stations and the Tanner Park Marina. The north station, located on Dixon Ave. houses the Vigilant Engine Company and the Yellowbirds firematic drill team. The south station on Great Neck Rd. houses the Eagle Engine Company, the Hook, Ladder and Rescue Company, the Emergency Medical Services squad, and the Special Operations and Rescue squad.

The department operates four engines, two utility vehicles assigned to each engine company, a 90-foot tower ladder, a heavy rescue truck, three ambulances, an ALS first response vehicle. The Special Operations and Rescue squad operates a fully enclosed and climate controlled 5-ton high water rescue vehicle, three boats ranging from a 19-foot Boston Whaler to a small inflatable, a Special Ops rescue van, a Yamaha side by side, and a double decker boat trailer.

== Notable people ==
- Don Anding (b. 1991), soccer player
- Jerry Schatz (1925–2016), child actor
- Chris Chetti (b. 1974), professional wrestler
- Kene Holliday, actor
- Donnie McClurkin, gospel singer and minister
- Mike James, NBA player
- John Tartamella, mobster
