= Aquebogue, New York =

- Hamlet and census-designated place
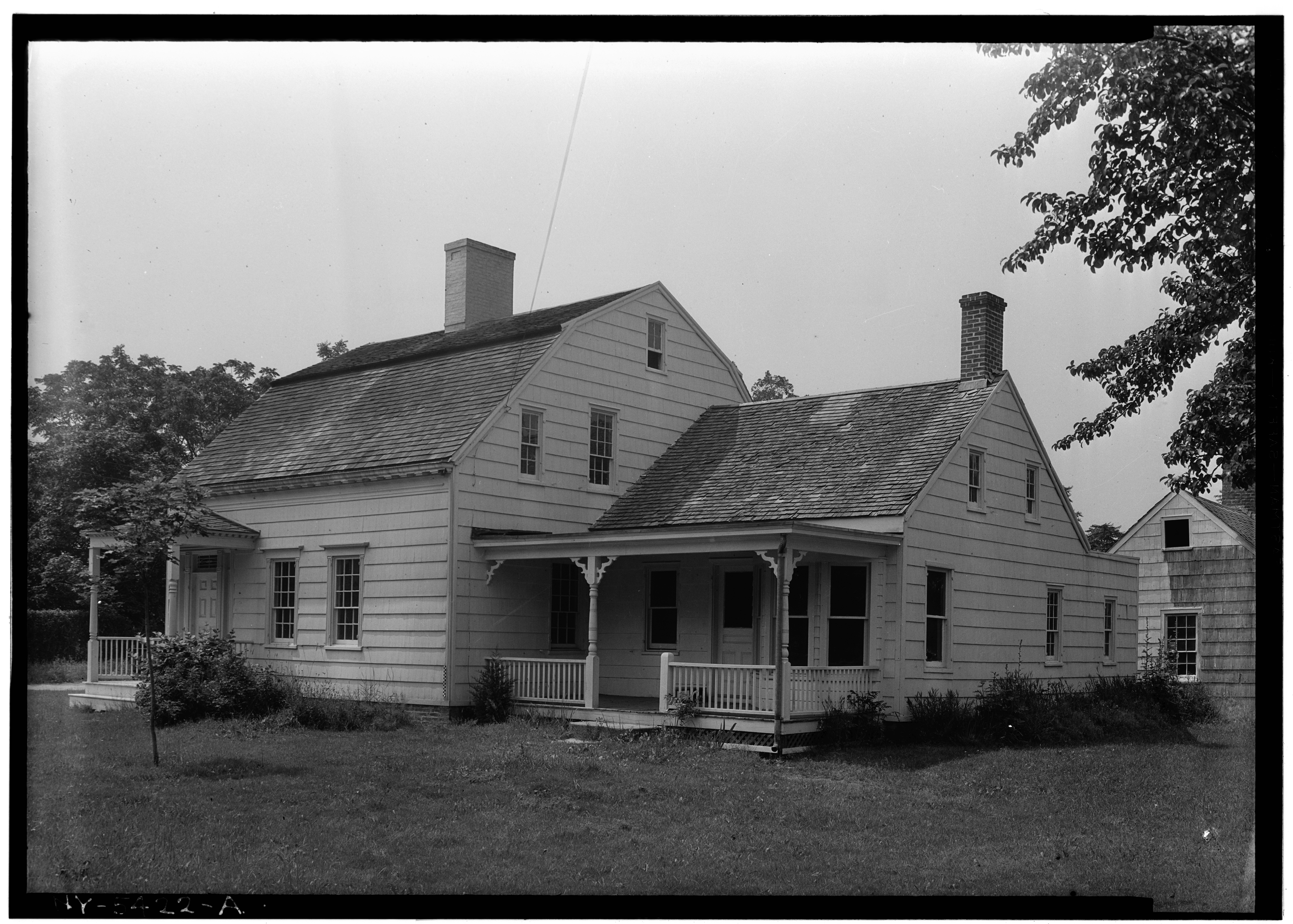
- The historic Corwin House in Aquebogue.

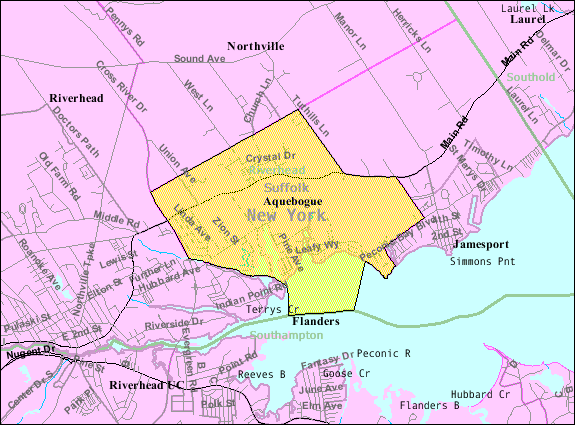
- U.S. Census map of Aquebogue.

- Location within the state of New York.
- Coordinates: 40°56′8″N 72°37′14″W
- Country: United States
- State: New York
- County: Suffolk
- Town: Riverhead

Area
  - Total: 3.91 sq mi (10.12 km^{2})
  - Land: 3.80 sq mi (9.85 km^{2})
  - Water: 0.10 sq mi (0.26 km^{2})
- Elevation: 39 ft (12 m)

Population (2020)
  - Total: 2,547
  - Density: 669.4/sq mi (258.47/km^{2})
- Time zone: UTC-5 (Eastern (EST))
  - Summer (DST): UTC-4 (EDT)
- ZIP code: 11931
- Area code: 631
- FIPS code: 36-02374
- GNIS feature ID: 0942523

Aquebogue (/ˈæ.kwəˌbɑːɡ/) is a census-designated place (CDP) roughly corresponding to the hamlet by the same name in the Town of Riverhead in Suffolk County, on Long Island, in New York, United States. As of the 2020 census, Aquebogue had a population of 2,547.

Aquebogue is part of Long Island's North Fork wine region and is home to such wineries as Paumanouk Vineyards.

== Geography ==
According to the United States Census Bureau, the CDP has a total area of 3.9 square miles (10.1 km^{2}), of which 3.8 square miles (9.9 km^{2}) is land and 0.12 square miles (0.3 km^{2}), or 2.53%, is water.

=== Climate ===
The climate in this area is characterized by hot, humid summers and generally mild to cool winters. According to the Köppen Climate Classification system, Aquebogue has a humid subtropical climate, abbreviated "Cfa" on climate maps.

== Demographics ==
Historical population
| Census | Pop. | Note | %± |
|---|---|---|---|
| 2020 | 2,547 | | — |
U.S. Decennial Census

=== 2020 census ===
As of the 2020 census, Aquebogue had a population of 2,547. The median age was 48.1 years. 18.4% of residents were under the age of 18 and 23.0% of residents were 65 years of age or older. For every 100 females there were 98.1 males, and for every 100 females age 18 and over there were 95.9 males age 18 and over.

91.4% of residents lived in urban areas, while 8.6% lived in rural areas.

There were 969 households in Aquebogue, of which 24.5% had children under the age of 18 living in them. Of all households, 57.9% were married-couple households, 15.2% were households with a male householder and no spouse or partner present, and 20.5% were households with a female householder and no spouse or partner present. About 25.0% of all households were made up of individuals and 15.5% had someone living alone who was 65 years of age or older.

There were 1,164 housing units, of which 16.8% were vacant. The homeowner vacancy rate was 1.5% and the rental vacancy rate was 9.3%.

Racial composition as of the 2020 census
| Race | Number | Percent |
|---|---|---|
| White | 1,973 | 77.5% |
| Black or African American | 57 | 2.2% |
| American Indian and Alaska Native | 15 | 0.6% |
| Asian | 26 | 1.0% |
| Native Hawaiian and Other Pacific Islander | 1 | 0.0% |
| Some other race | 225 | 8.8% |
| Two or more races | 250 | 9.8% |
| Hispanic or Latino (of any race) | 476 | 18.7% |

=== 2000 census ===
As of the census of 2000, there were 2,254 people, 872 households, and 629 families residing in the CDP. The population density was 587.3 inhabitants per square mile (226.8/km^{2}). There were 1,013 housing units at an average density of 263.9 per square mile (101.9/km^{2}). The racial makeup of the CDP was 92.77% White, 5.24% African American, 0.04% Native American, 0.31% Asian, 0.53% from other races, and 1.11% from two or more races. Hispanic or Latino of any race were 3.24% of the population.

There were 872 households, out of which 30.3% had children under the age of 18 living with them, 61.0% were married couples living together, 8.3% had a female householder with no husband present, and 27.8% were non-families. 21.0% of all households were made up of individuals, and 12.4% had someone living alone who was 65 years of age or older. The average household size was 2.57 and the average family size was 3.03.

In the CDP, the population was spread out, with 23.4% under the age of 18, 5.9% from 18 to 24, 27.9% from 25 to 44, 26.4% from 45 to 64, and 16.5% who were 65 years of age or older. The median age was 41 years. For every 100 females, there were 90.7 males. For every 100 females age 18 and over, there were 87.3 males.

The median income for a household in the CDP was $54,453, and the median income for a family was $60,375. Males had a median income of $38,776 versus $37,750 for females. The per capita income for the CDP was $31,825. About 5.9% of families and 10.8% of the population were below the poverty line, including 10.6% of those under age 18 and 16.5% of those age 65 or over.
