= Sisters of St. Dominic Motherhouse Complex =

- Dominican Village - Sisters of St. Dominic Motherhouse Complex
- U.S. National Register of Historic Places
- U.S. Historic district
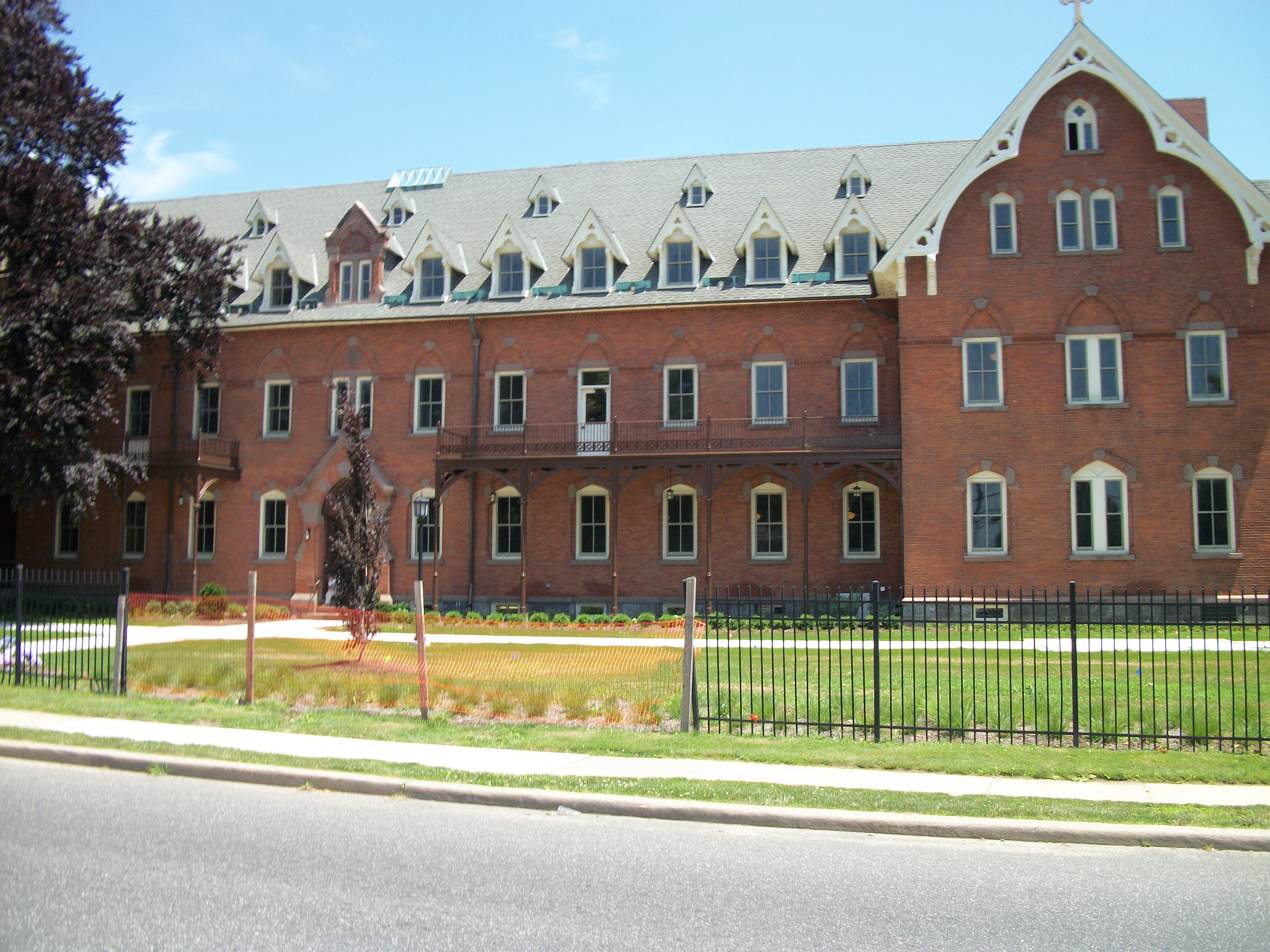
- "Queen of the Rosary Academy" on Albany Avenue.

- Location within New York Location within the United States
- Location: 555 Albany Ave., North Amityville, New York
- Coordinates: 40°42′18″N 73°24′14″W
- Area: 9.6 acres (3.9 ha)
- Built: 1878
- Architect: Schickel, William; Rauth Bro; Berlenbach, Joseph (carpenter)
- Architectural style: Greek Revival, Gothic Revival
- NRHP reference No.: 07000625
- Added to NRHP: June 27, 2007

Sisters of St. Dominic Motherhouse Complex, is a historic convent complex and national historic district at 555 Albany Avenue in North Amityville, Suffolk County, New York.

The complex consists of five contributing buildings, a cemetery, and grotto. Rosary Hall (formerly the novitiate for the sisters whose original motherhouse was at Graham and Montrose Avenues in Williamsburg, Brooklyn) is the largest building in the complex and has four sections.

It was built 1876–1878 and in a Gothic Revival style brick quadrangle composed of three 2½-story sections and a 1½-story section. Rosary Hall includes the chapel, which has a tall steeple. At the center of the quadrangle is the Cloister Garden. The remaining building is Seraphina Cottage, the original novitiate. It was built about 1850 and is a 1½-story vernacular Greek Revival farmhouse.

St. Dominic Motherhouse Complex was added to the National Register of Historic Places in 2007.
