= John Tartamella =

American mobster (1891–1966)

John Tartamella (March 11, 1891 – July 13, 1966) was consigliere for over 30 years to Joseph Bonanno and his family. He was considered a very wise and shrewd elder-statesman who was respected throughout La Cosa Nostra. Born in Castellammare del Golfo, Sicily, he "devoted much of his time to the cause of the barbers". His son was Sereno Tartamella, a Bonanno soldier and top aide to rebel faction bosses Gaspare DiGregorio and Paul Sciacca acting as a courier between them and Stefano Magaddino, boss of the Buffalo crime family during the bloody "Bonanno War" during the mid/late 1960s. Sereno became a union official for the Beauty Culturist Union. He also was well known for his "joke telling", able to make even the most vicious mob boss smile.

Tartamella worked as a union organizer in Brooklyn where he led his "local" into the CIO after a break with the AFL. He was expelled by the Italian-American Labor Council "because of his radical views".

On July 13, 1966, Tartamella died of natural causes at his home in Copiague, New York.
