= Wheatley Heights, New York =

- Census-designated place
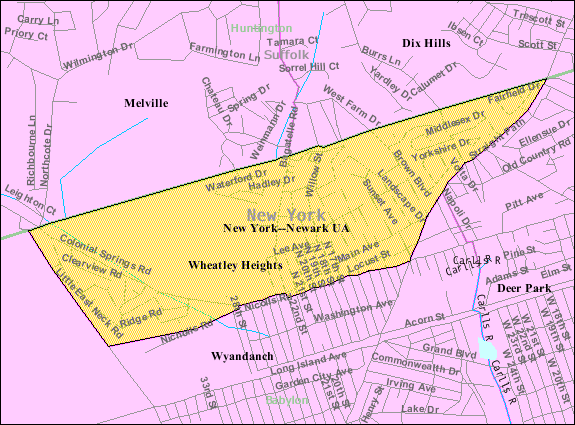
- U.S. Census map

- Location on Long Island Location within the state of New York
- Coordinates: 40°45′43″N 73°22′1″W
- Country: United States
- State: New York
- County: Suffolk
- Town: Babylon

Area
  - Total: 1.32 sq mi (3.41 km^{2})
  - Land: 1.32 sq mi (3.41 km^{2})
  - Water: 0 sq mi (0.00 km^{2})
- Elevation: 102 ft (31 m)

Population (2020)
  - Total: 5,140
  - Density: 3,900.3/sq mi (1,505.92/km^{2})
- Time zone: UTC-5 (Eastern (EST))
  - Summer (DST): UTC-4 (EDT)
- ZIP code: 11798
- Area codes: 631, 934
- FIPS code: 36-81419
- GNIS feature ID: 1867425

Wheatley Heights is a hamlet and census-designated place (CDP) located within the Town of Babylon, in Suffolk County, on Long Island, New York, United States. The population was 5,140 at the time of the 2020 census.

In the past, some or all of Wheatley Heights was proposed to become part of the never-realized Incorporated Village of Half Hollow Hills.

== History ==
Wheatley Heights historically was part of the hamlet of Wyandanch, and shares a ZIP code and fire department with it. The name Wyandanch was changed to Wheatley Heights by the Postmaster of Wyandanch Thomas A. Brown.

Around 2001, Wheatley Heights and its neighbors Dix Hills, East Farmingdale, and Melville (all partially or wholly within the Half Hollow Hills Central School District) proposed incorporating as a single village, which would have been known as the Incorporated Village of Half Hollow Hills. These plans failed, and each remain unincorporated hamlets to this day.

== Geography ==
According to the United States Census Bureau, the CDP has a total area of 1.4 square miles (3.6 km^{2}), all land.

Wheatley Heights is bordered by Dix Hills to the northeast, East Farmingdale to the west, Deer Park to the east, Wyandanch to the south, and Melville to the northwest.

== Demographics ==
Historical population
Census	Pop.	Note	%±
2000	5,013		—
2010	5,130		2.3%
2020	5,140		0.2%
U.S. Decennial Census

Wheatley Heights CDP, New York – Racial and ethnic composition Note: the US Census treats Hispanic/Latino as an ethnic category. This table excludes Latinos from the racial categories and assigns them to a separate category. Hispanics/Latinos may be of any race.
Race / Ethnicity (NH = Non-Hispanic)	Pop 2000	Pop 2010	Pop 2020	% 2000	% 2010	% 2020
White alone (NH)	1,734	1,237	919	34.59%	24.11%	17.88%
Black or African American alone (NH)	2,344	2,701	2,619	46.76%	52.65%	50.95%
Native American or Alaska Native alone (NH)	15	14	5	0.30%	0.27%	0.10%
Asian alone (NH)	171	285	395	3.41%	5.56%	7.68%
Native Hawaiian or Pacific Islander alone (NH)	0	0	0	nil%	nil%	nil%
Other race alone (NH)	26	30	74	0.52%	0.58%	1.44%
Mixed race or Multiracial (NH)	138	171	250	2.75%	3.33%	4.86%
Hispanic or Latino (any race)	585	692	878	11.67%	13.49%	17.08%
Total	5,013	5,130	5,140	100%	100%	100%

=== 2000 census ===
As of the census of 2000, and there were 5,013 people, 1,455 households, and 1,223 families residing in the CDP. The population density was 3,704.7 inhabitants per square mile (1,430.4/km^{2}). There were 1,494 housing units at an average density of 1,104.1 per square mile (426.3/km^{2}). The racial makeup of the CDP was 40.00% White, 48.41% Black or African American, 0.30% Native American, 3.41% Asian, 4.15% from other races, and 3.73% from two or more races. Hispanic or Latino of any race were 11.67% of the population.

There were 1,455 households, out of which 43.6% had children under the age of 18 living with them, 62.2% were married couples living together, 17.0% had a female householder with no husband present, and 15.9% were non-families. 13.0% of all households were made up of individuals, and 5.2% had someone living alone who was 65 years of age or older. The average household size was 3.42 and the average family size was 3.67.

In the CDP, the population was spread out, with 30.3% under the age of 18, 8.1% from 18 to 24, 29.9% from 25 to 44, 23.8% from 45 to 64, and 7.9% who were 65 years of age or older. The median age was 35 years. For every 100 females, there were 95.1 males. For every 100 females age 18 and over, there were 89.3 males.

The median income for a household in the CDP was $99,583. The per capita income for the CDP was $30,726. About 3.4% of families and 4.8% of the population were below the poverty line, including 7.6% of those under age 18 and 8.3% of those age 65 or over.

== Notable people ==
Notable residents have included Washington Commanders football player Stephen Bowen, Assemblywoman Kimberly Jean-Pierre, and all four members of 90's boy-band and R&B song-sation Soul 4 Real.
