= Nathaniel Conklin House =

Historic house in New York, United States

- U.S. National Register of Historic Places
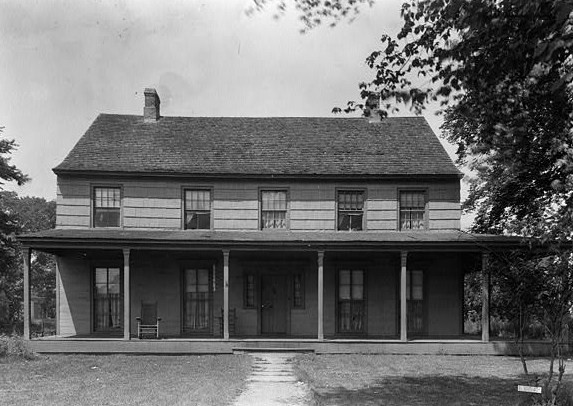
- Nathaniel Conklin House, 1936 HABS photo

- Location within New York Location within the United States
- Location: 280 Deer Park Ave., Babylon, New York
- Coordinates: 40°42′2″N 73°19′23″W
- Area: 1 acre (0.40 ha)
- Built: 1803
- Architect: Nathaniel Conklin
- Architectural style: Colonial, Federal, Postmedieval English
- NRHP reference No.: 88002683
- Added to NRHP: December 8, 1988

The Nathaniel Conklin House is a historic house located at 280 Deer Park Avenue in Babylon, Suffolk County, New York.

== Description ==
It was built in 1803 and consists of a rectangular main block and a smaller back extension. It has a two-story plus attic, five-bay-wide, frame building with an attached kitchen wing of one and one half stories. It was moved to its present site in 1871. It has been owned and operated by the American Red Cross since 1945. As described by state records, the house is notable in its attention to craftsmanship. "The weather sheathing of this 1803 house is of hand-split and dressed shingles (except under the porch). These are butt-nailed with cut nails set and puttied."

== National Register of Historic Places ==
It was added to the National Register of Historic Places on December 8, 1988.
