= North Lindenhurst, New York =

- Hamlet and census-designated place
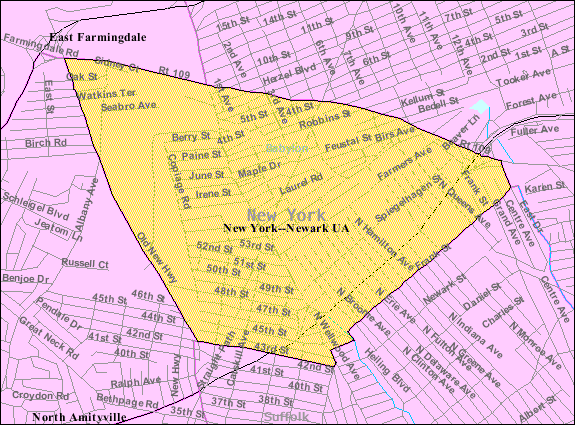
- U.S. Census Map

- Location on Long Island Location within the state of New York
- Coordinates: 40°42′25″N 73°23′6″W
- Country: United States
- State: New York
- County: Suffolk
- Town: Babylon

Area
  - Total: 1.93 sq mi (5.00 km^{2})
  - Land: 1.93 sq mi (5.00 km^{2})
  - Water: 0 sq mi (0.00 km^{2})
- Elevation: 43 ft (13 m)

Population (2020)
  - Total: 12,000
  - Density: 6,216.0/sq mi (2,400.01/km^{2})
- Time zone: UTC-5 (Eastern (EST))
  - Summer (DST): UTC-4 (EDT)
- ZIP code: 11757
- Area codes: 631, 934
- FIPS code: 36-53198
- GNIS feature ID: 0958843

North Lindenhurst is a hamlet and census-designated place in the Town of Babylon in Suffolk County, on the South Shore of Long Island, in New York, United States. It is considered part of the Greater Lindenhurst area, which is anchored by the Incorporated Village of Lindenhurst. The population was 12,000 at the time of the 2020 census.

== Geography ==
According to the United States Census Bureau, the CDP has a total area of 1.9 square miles (4.9 km^{2}), all land.

North Lindenhurst is bordered by North Amityville to the west, East Farmingdale to the northwest, West Babylon to the northeast, and the Village of Lindenhurst to the south.

Most of North Lindenhurst is served by the Lindenhurst Post Office and School District.

== Demographics ==
Historical population
Census	Pop.	Note	%±
2010	11,652		—
2020	12,000		3.0%
U.S. Decennial Census

=== 2020 census ===
As of the 2020 census, North Lindenhurst had a population of 12,000. The median age was 39.5 years. 20.8% of residents were under the age of 18 and 14.3% of residents were 65 years of age or older. For every 100 females there were 93.5 males, and for every 100 females age 18 and over there were 92.4 males age 18 and over.

100.0% of residents lived in urban areas, while 0.0% lived in rural areas.

There were 3,861 households in North Lindenhurst, of which 34.3% had children under the age of 18 living in them. Of all households, 53.3% were married-couple households, 15.8% were households with a male householder and no spouse or partner present, and 25.0% were households with a female householder and no spouse or partner present. About 19.9% of all households were made up of individuals and 10.0% had someone living alone who was 65 years of age or older.

There were 4,016 housing units, of which 3.9% were vacant. The homeowner vacancy rate was 1.0% and the rental vacancy rate was 4.5%.

Racial composition as of the 2020 census
Race	Number	Percent
White	7,530	62.8%
Black or African American	774	6.5%
American Indian and Alaska Native	59	0.5%
Asian	453	3.8%
Native Hawaiian and Other Pacific Islander	3	0.0%
Some other race	1,806	15.1%
Two or more races	1,375	11.5%
Hispanic or Latino (of any race)	3,390	28.2%

=== 2010 census ===
As of the 2010 census, there were 11,652 people and 3,787 households, with 3.09 persons per household in the CDP. The population density was 6,068.8 inhabitants per square mile (2,343.2/km^{2}).

There were 3,898 housing units, of which 23.8% were in multi-unit structures. The homeownership rate was 76.2%. The median value of owner-occupied housing units was $370,100. 2.8% of housing units were vacant and 30.6% of occupied housing units were occupied by renters.

The racial makeup of the CDP was 81.5% White, 5.1% African American, 0.3% Native American, 3.1% Asian, 0.0% Pacific Islander, 7.1% from other races, and 2.8% from two or more races. Hispanic or Latino of any race were 19.3% of the population. The CDP was 71.1% non-Hispanic White.

There were 3,787 households, out of which 40.0% had children under the age of 18 living with them, 55.7% were married couples living together, 13.5% had a female householder with no husband present, and 23.8% were non-families. 19.0% of all households were made up of individuals, and 7.8% had someone living alone who was 65 years of age or older. The average household size was 3.07 and the average family size was 3.47.

In the CDP, the population was spread out, with 6.2% under the age of 5, 23.7% under the age of 18, 3.3% from 20 to 24, 28.1% from 25 to 44, 77.9% from 45 to 64, and 11.0% who were 65 years of age or older. The median age was 38.0 years.

=== Demographic estimates ===
95.4% of the population had lived in the same house 1 year & over. 19.8% of the population were foreign born, and 25.5% of residents at least 5 years old spoke a language other than English at home.

85.7% of residents at least 25 years old had graduated high school and 16.2% of residents at least 25 years old had a bachelor's degree or higher. The mean travel time to work for workers aged 16 and over was 25.8 minutes.

=== Income and poverty ===
The median income for a household in the CDP was $74,510. The per capita income for the CDP was $28,604. 3.9% of the population were below the poverty line.

== Education ==
Most of North Lindenhurst is served by the Lindenhurst Union Free School District. About one-eighth of the land area is served by the Copiague Union Free School District; – an area consisting of three residential blocks. Another small portion of North Lindenhurst is located within the boundaries of the Farmingdale Union Free School District – although this area has no residential blocks.

William Rall School is the only public school in North Lindenhurst, it serves most elementary students of the hamlet; however, areas southeast of Straight Path and west of Wellwood Avenue are zoned to Albany Avenue School, and areas east of Wellwood Avenue and south of Sunrise Highway are zoned to Daniel Street School.

== Transportation ==
New York State Route 27 (Sunrise Highway) passes through North Lindenhurst. Additionally, New York State Route 109 forms the CDP's northern border.
