= North Amityville, New York =

- Hamlet and Census-designated place
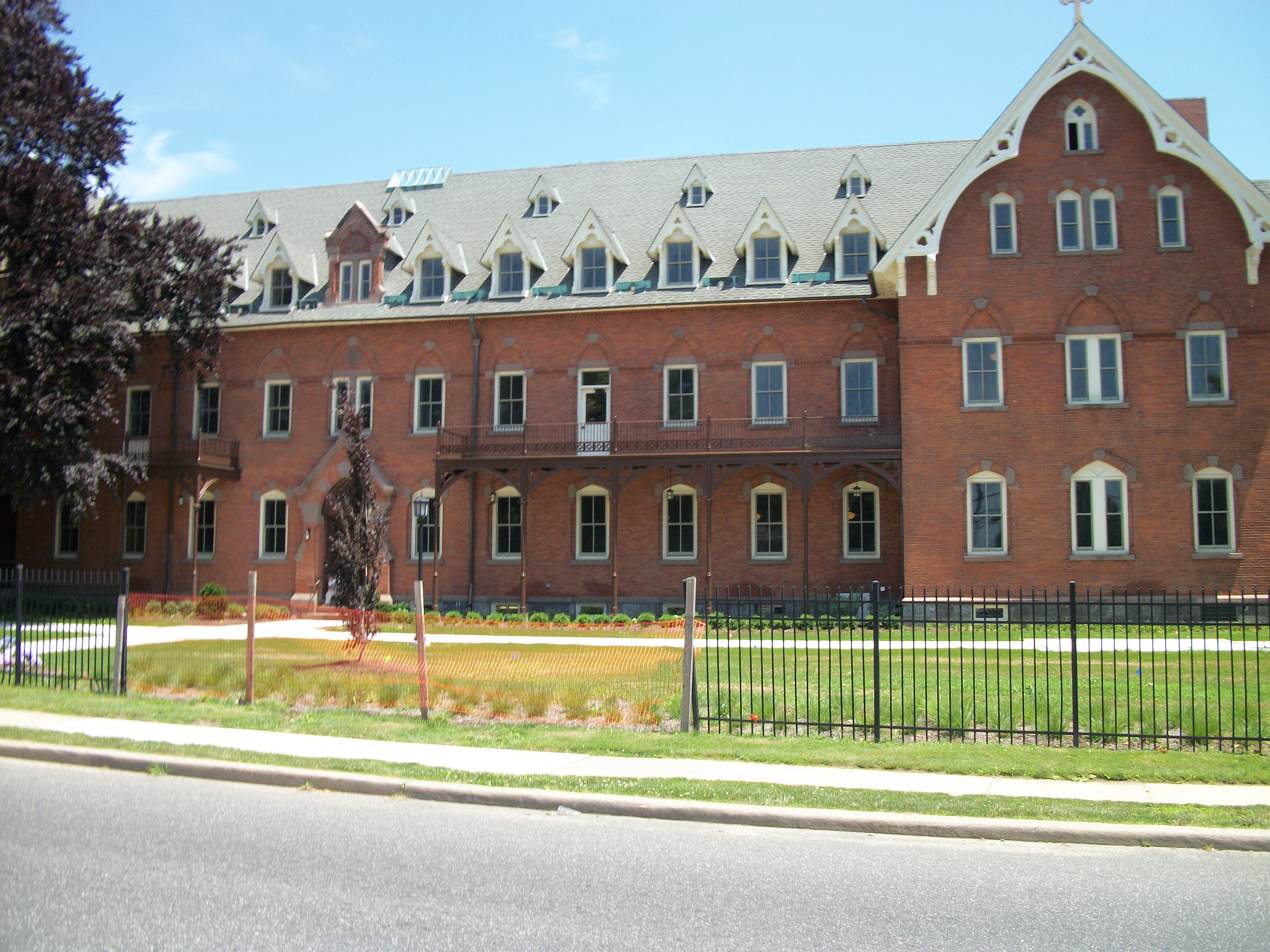
- The Sisters of St. Dominic Motherhouse Complex, one of North Amityville's best-known landmarks.

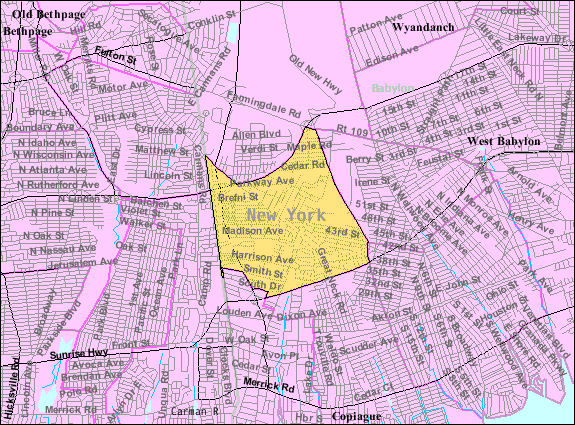
- U.S. Census map of North Amityville.

- Location within the state of New York.
- Coordinates: 40°42′1″N 73°24′46″W
- Country: United States
- State: New York
- County: Suffolk
- Town: Babylon

Area
  - Total: 2.36 sq mi (6.10 km^{2})
  - Land: 2.36 sq mi (6.10 km^{2})
  - Water: 0 sq mi (0.00 km^{2})
- Elevation: 33 ft (10 m)

Population (2020)
  - Total: 18,643
  - Density: 7,910.7/sq mi (3,054.34/km^{2})
- Time zone: UTC-5 (Eastern (EST))
  - Summer (DST): UTC-4 (EDT)
- ZIP code: 11701, 11726
- Area code: 631
- FIPS code: 36-51396
- GNIS feature ID: 0958665

North Amityville is a hamlet and census-designated place (CDP) in the Town of Babylon in Suffolk County, on the South Shore of Long Island, in New York. The population was 18,643 at the 2020 Census.

== Geography ==
According to the United States Census Bureau, the CDP has a total area of 2.4 square miles (6.1 km^{2}), all land.

North Amityville is bordered by the hamlet of East Massapequa (in Nassau County) to the west, the hamlet of East Farmingdale to the north, the hamlet of North Lindenhurst to the southeast, the Village of Lindenhurst to the southeast, and the Village of Amityville and the hamlet of Copiague to the south.

== Demographics ==
Historical population
Census	Pop.	Note	%±
2000	16,572		—
2010	17,862		7.8%
2020	18,643		4.4%
U.S. Decennial Census; 2010 2020

=== Racial and ethnic composition ===
North Amityville CDP, New York – Racial and ethnic composition Note: the US Census treats Hispanic/Latino as an ethnic category. This table excludes Latinos from the racial categories and assigns them to a separate category. Hispanics/Latinos may be of any race.
Race / Ethnicity (NH = Non-Hispanic)	Pop 2000	Pop 2010	Pop 2020	% 2000	% 2010	% 2020
White alone (NH)	2,279	1,907	1,678	13.75%	10.68%	9.00%
Black or African American alone (NH)	11,071	10,076	8,834	66.81%	56.41%	47.39%
Native American or Alaska Native alone (NH)	169	130	123	1.02%	0.73%	0.66%
Asian alone (NH)	173	167	280	1.04%	0.93%	1.50%
Pacific Islander alone (NH)	5	9	10	0.03%	0.05%	0.05%
Other race alone (NH)	46	70	223	0.28%	0.39%	1.20%
Mixed race or Multiracial (NH)	587	410	596	3.54%	2.30%	3.20%
Hispanic or Latino (any race)	2,242	5,093	6,899	13.53%	28.51%	37.01%
Total	16,572	17,862	18,643	100.00%	100.00%	100.00%

=== 2020 census ===
As of the 2020 census, North Amityville had a population of 18,643. The median age was 36.3 years. 23.7% of residents were under the age of 18 and 13.6% of residents were 65 years of age or older. For every 100 females there were 89.8 males, and for every 100 females age 18 and over there were 85.4 males age 18 and over.

100.0% of residents lived in urban areas, while 0.0% lived in rural areas.

There were 5,304 households in North Amityville, of which 38.6% had children under the age of 18 living in them. Of all households, 35.7% were married-couple households, 19.1% were households with a male householder and no spouse or partner present, and 38.6% were households with a female householder and no spouse or partner present. About 24.5% of all households were made up of individuals and 11.4% had someone living alone who was 65 years of age or older.

There were 5,628 housing units, of which 5.8% were vacant. The homeowner vacancy rate was 1.4% and the rental vacancy rate was 4.5%.

Racial composition as of the 2020 census
Race	Number	Percent
White	2,221	11.9%
Black or African American	9,112	48.9%
American Indian and Alaska Native	211	1.1%
Asian	289	1.6%
Native Hawaiian and Other Pacific Islander	15	0.1%
Some other race	4,798	25.7%
Two or more races	1,997	10.7%
Hispanic or Latino (of any race)	6,899	37.0%

=== 2010 census ===
As of the census of 2010, there were 17,862 people, and 5,289 households with an average of 3.26 persons per household residing in the hamlet. The population density was 7,587.9 square miles (19,653 km^{2}). The racial makeup of the CDP was 35.8% African American, 27.5% White, 1.4% Native American, 11.2% Asian, 0.1% Pacific Islander, 12.8% from other races, and 6.7% from two or more races. Hispanic or Latino of any race were 34.7% 6,237 of the population.

The population in North Amityville was 7.0% under the age of 5, 27.0% under the age of 18, and 12.2% over the age of 65. Females make up 53.9% of the population.

There were 5,636 housing units, of which 25.8% were in multi-unit structures. The homeownership rate was 62.3%. The median value of owner-occupied housing units was $339,100. 5.4% of housing units were vacant and 39.4% of occupied housing units were occupied by renters.

The median income for a household in the hamlet was $90,502. 2.8% of the population were below the poverty line.

== Education ==
North Amityville is served by three public school districts. Residents in the eastern portion are within Copiague Union Free School District, while areas to the west are within the Amityville Union Free School District. The Farmingdale Union Free School District covers a small portion in the north. As such, children who reside within North Amityville and attend public schools will go to school in one of these three districts, depending on where in the hamlet they live.

== Transportation ==
The Long Island Rail Road does not have a branch in North Amityville. Instead, residents are near the Copiague (LIRR station) & the Amityville (LIRR station). Several Suffolk County Transit routes also serve North Amityville.

== Landmark ==
- Sisters of St. Dominic Motherhouse Complex
