= East Farmingdale, New York =

- Hamlet and census-designated place
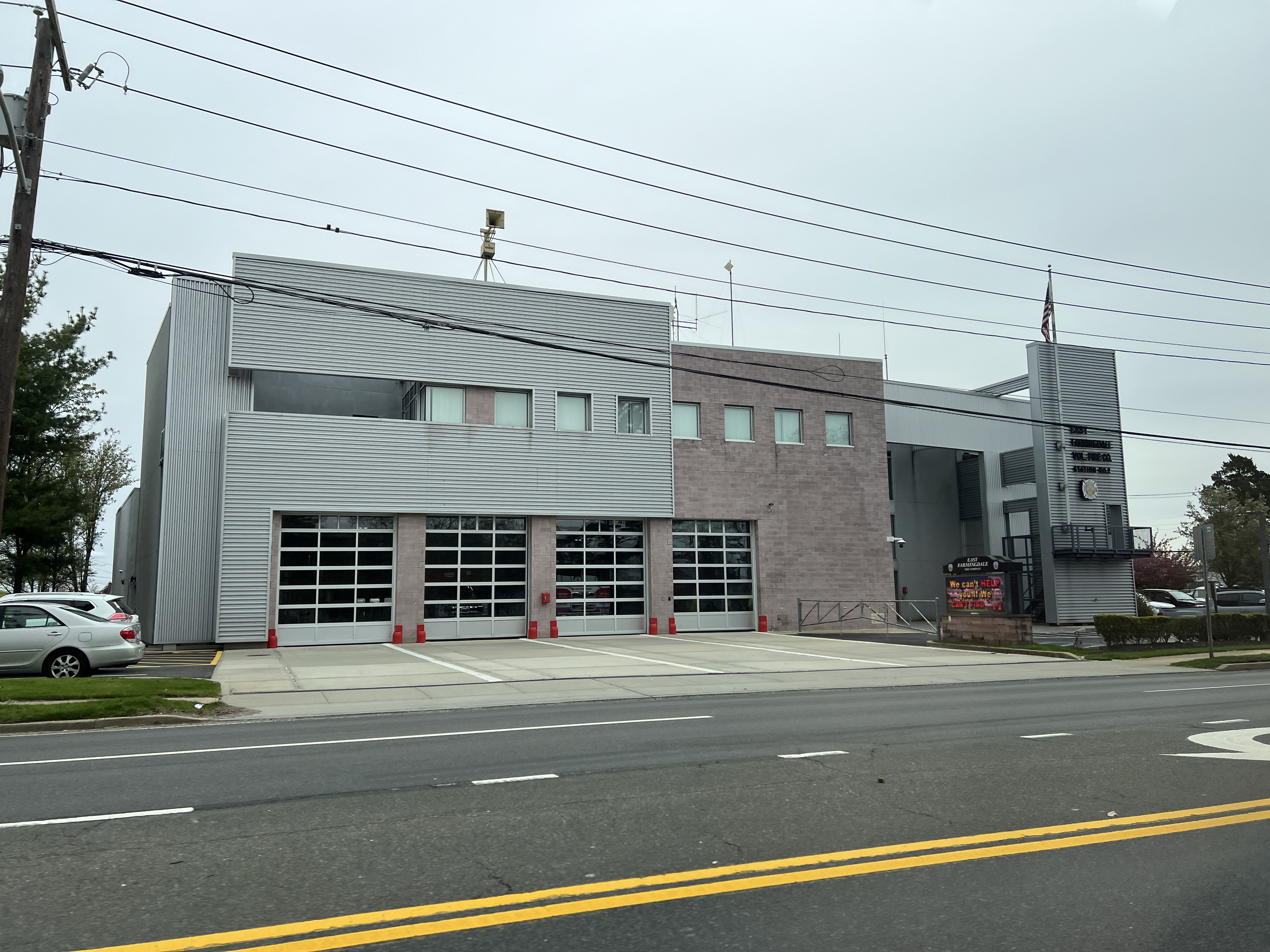
- The Wellwood Avenue Fire Station, located within East Farmingdale, in 2024

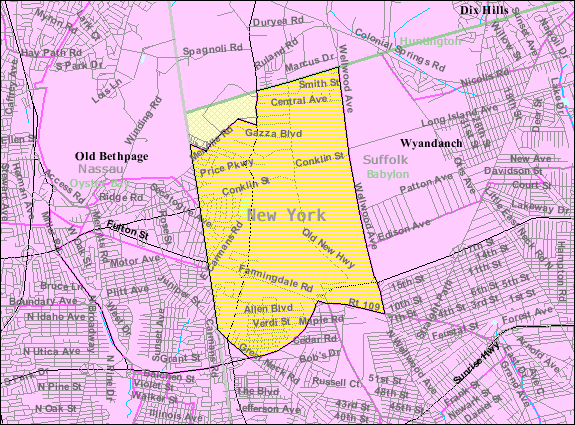
- U.S. Census map

- Location on Long Island Location within the state of New York
- Coordinates: 40°43′30″N 73°25′34″W
- Country: United States
- State: New York
- County: Suffolk
- Town: Babylon

Area
  - Total: 7.48 sq mi (19.37 km^{2})
  - Land: 7.48 sq mi (19.37 km^{2})
  - Water: 0 sq mi (0.00 km^{2})
- Elevation: 69 ft (21 m)

Population (2020)
  - Total: 6,617
  - Density: 884.9/sq mi (341.68/km^{2})
- Time zone: UTC-5 (Eastern (EST))
  - Summer (DST): UTC-4 (EDT)
- Postal code: 11735
- Area codes: 631, 934
- FIPS code: 36-21985
- GNIS feature ID: 1867401

East Farmingdale is a hamlet and a census-designated place (CDP) located within the Town of Babylon in Suffolk County, on the South Shore of Long Island, in New York, United States. The population was 6,617 at the time of the 2020 census.

In the past, some or all East Farmingdale was proposed to become part of the never-realized Incorporated Village of Half Hollow Hills.

== History ==
Around 2001, East Farmingdale and its neighbors Dix Hills, Melville, and Wheatley Heights (all partially or wholly within the Half Hollow Hills Central School District) proposed incorporating as a single village called the Incorporated Village of Half Hollow Hills. These plans failed and, as such, each remain unincorporated hamlets to this day.

== Geography ==
According to the United States Census Bureau, the CDP has a total area of 5.8 square miles (14.9 km^{2}), of which 5.7 square miles (14.8 km^{2}) is land and 0.04 square miles (0.1 km^{2}), or 0.35%, is water.

East Farmingdale is bordered to the west by South Farmingdale, the village of Farmingdale, to the north Melville, and to the northwest by Old Bethpage, to the east by Wyandanch and West Babylon, to the southeast by North Lindenhurst, and to the south by North Amityville.

== Demographics ==
Historical population
Census	Pop.	Note	%±
2000	5,400		—
2010	6,484		20.1%
2020	6,617		2.1%
U.S. Decennial Census

=== 2020 census ===
As of the 2020 census, East Farmingdale had a population of 6,617. The median age was 39.5 years. 18.8% of residents were under the age of 18 and 15.9% of residents were 65 years of age or older. For every 100 females there were 96.8 males, and for every 100 females age 18 and over there were 95.4 males age 18 and over.

100.0% of residents lived in urban areas, while 0.0% lived in rural areas.

There were 2,177 households in East Farmingdale, of which 30.4% had children under the age of 18 living in them. Of all households, 47.8% were married-couple households, 18.6% were households with a male householder and no spouse or partner present, and 28.0% were households with a female householder and no spouse or partner present. About 26.1% of all households were made up of individuals and 14.4% had someone living alone who was 65 years of age or older.

There were 2,275 housing units, of which 4.3% were vacant. The homeowner vacancy rate was 1.3% and the rental vacancy rate was 4.4%.

Racial composition as of the 2020 census
Race	Number	Percent
White	3,599	54.4%
Black or African American	817	12.3%
American Indian and Alaska Native	31	0.5%
Asian	532	8.0%
Native Hawaiian and Other Pacific Islander	2	0.0%
Some other race	972	14.7%
Two or more races	664	10.0%
Hispanic or Latino (of any race)	1,706	25.8%

=== 2010 census ===
As of the 2010 Census, there were 6,484 people and 2,002 households, with 3.00 persons per household. The population density was 1,137.5 per square mile (438.1 per km^{2}).

There were 2,114 housing units, of which 68.7% were owner-occupied. 5.3% of housing units were vacant and 31.3% of occupied housing units were occupied by renters.

The racial makeup of the CDP was 71.6% White, 12.5% African American, 0.2% Native American, 5.1% Asian, 0.1% Pacific Islander, 7.4% from other races, and 3.1% from two or more races. Hispanic or Latino of any race were 20.9% of the population. The CDP was 59.8% non-Hispanic White.

There were 2,002 households, out of which 36.4% had children under the age of 18 living with them, 52.6% were headed by married couples living together, 12.5% had a female householder with no husband present, and 29.6% were non-families. 24.7% of all households were made up of individuals, and 13.1% were someone living alone who was 65 years of age or older. The average household size was 3.00 and the average family size was 3.55.

In the CDP, the population was spread out, with 22.1% under the age of 18, 15.3% from 18 to 24, 25.6% from 25 to 44, 25.2% from 45 to 64, and 11.7% who were 65 years of age or older. The median age was 35.6 years.

=== Demographic estimates ===
For the period 2007–2011, an estimated 86.4% of the population had lived in the same house 1 year and over. 20.8% of the population were foreign-born, and 27.5% of residents at least 5 years old spoke a language other than English at home.

Over the period 2007-2011, 85.0% of residents at least 25 years old had graduated high school, and 26.9% of residents at least 25 years old had a bachelor's degree or higher. The mean travel time to work for workers aged 16 and over was 28.2 minutes.

=== Income and poverty ===
Between 2007 and 2011, the median annual income for a household in the CDP was an estimated $86,000. The per capita income for the CDP was $30,723. 3.3% of the population were below the poverty line. 26.4% of the housing units in the community were in multi-unit structures, and the median value of owner-occupied housing units was $423,200.

== Education ==
=== K-12 education ===
The portion of East Farmingdale north of Conklin Street is all within the Half Hollow Hills Central School District. Most elementary students go to Paumanok Elementary School or Signal Hill Elementary School. All secondary school students go to West Hollow Middle School and Half Hollow Hills High School East.

Most areas of East Farmingdale located south of Conklin Street are located within the Farmingdale Union Free School District. There is also a small area of East Farmingdale within the Copiague Union Free School District, but no residential homes are in this area.

All East Farmingdale elementary students in the Farmingdale Union Free School District attend Saltzman East Memorial Elementary School, which is the only public grade school located within East Farmingdale.

=== Higher education ===
East Farmingdale is home to Farmingdale State College. The college is located in the northwestern part of the CDP.

== Local attractions ==
New York State Route 110 (Broad Hollow Road) is one of the largest business corridors on Long Island, and many Long Island companies are based in East Farmingdale. Republic Airport is located in the center of the CDP, and Saint Charles Cemetery is just east of the airport. These two areas make up about one-third of the CDP's land area. Adventureland, one of Long island's most popular amusement parks, is located in East Farmingdale, across the street from Farmingdale State College.

== See also ==
- Farmingdale, New York
- South Farmingdale, New York
- Bethpage Purchase
