= Babylon, New York =

- Town
- Town of Babylon
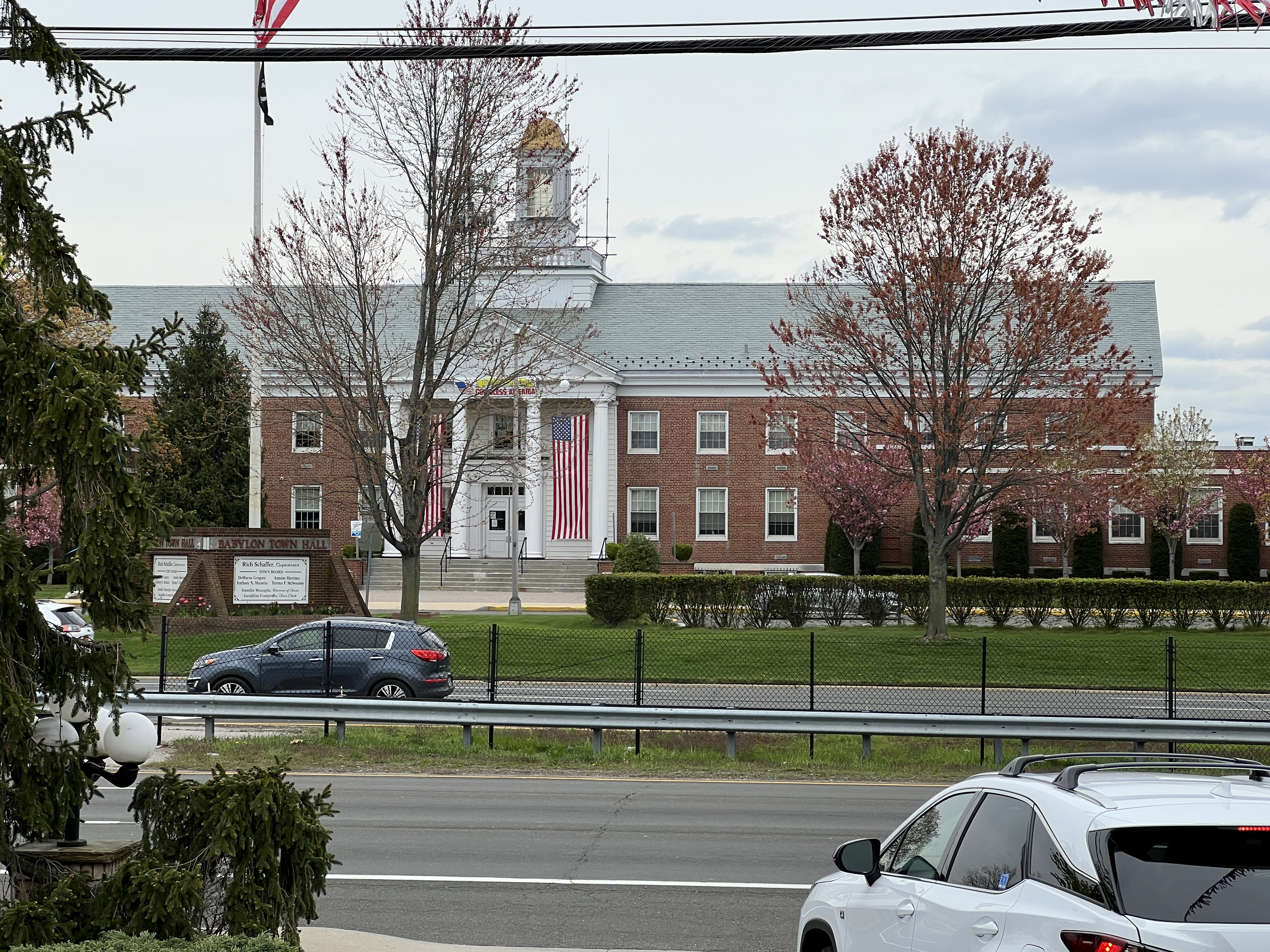
- Town hall

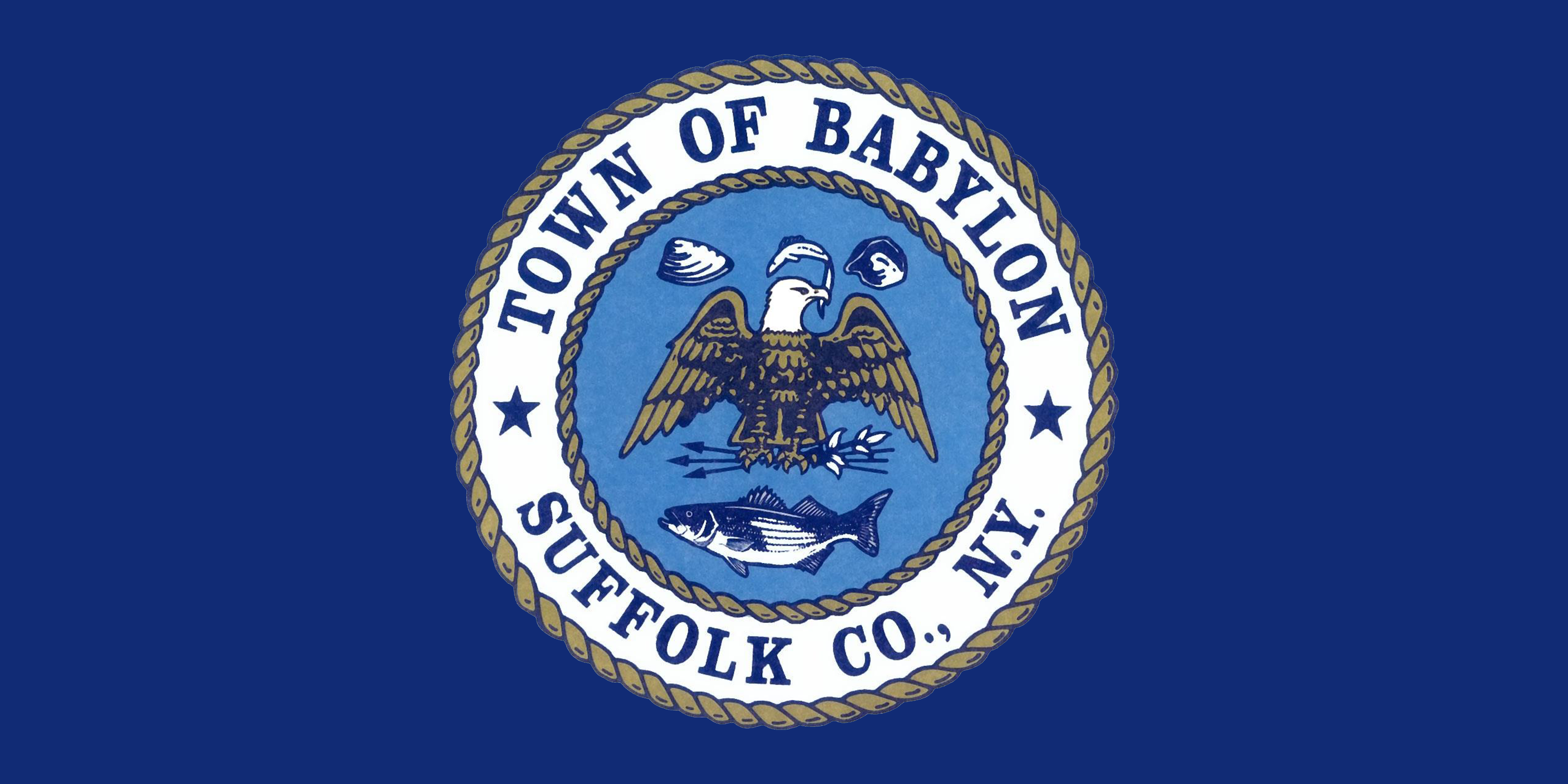
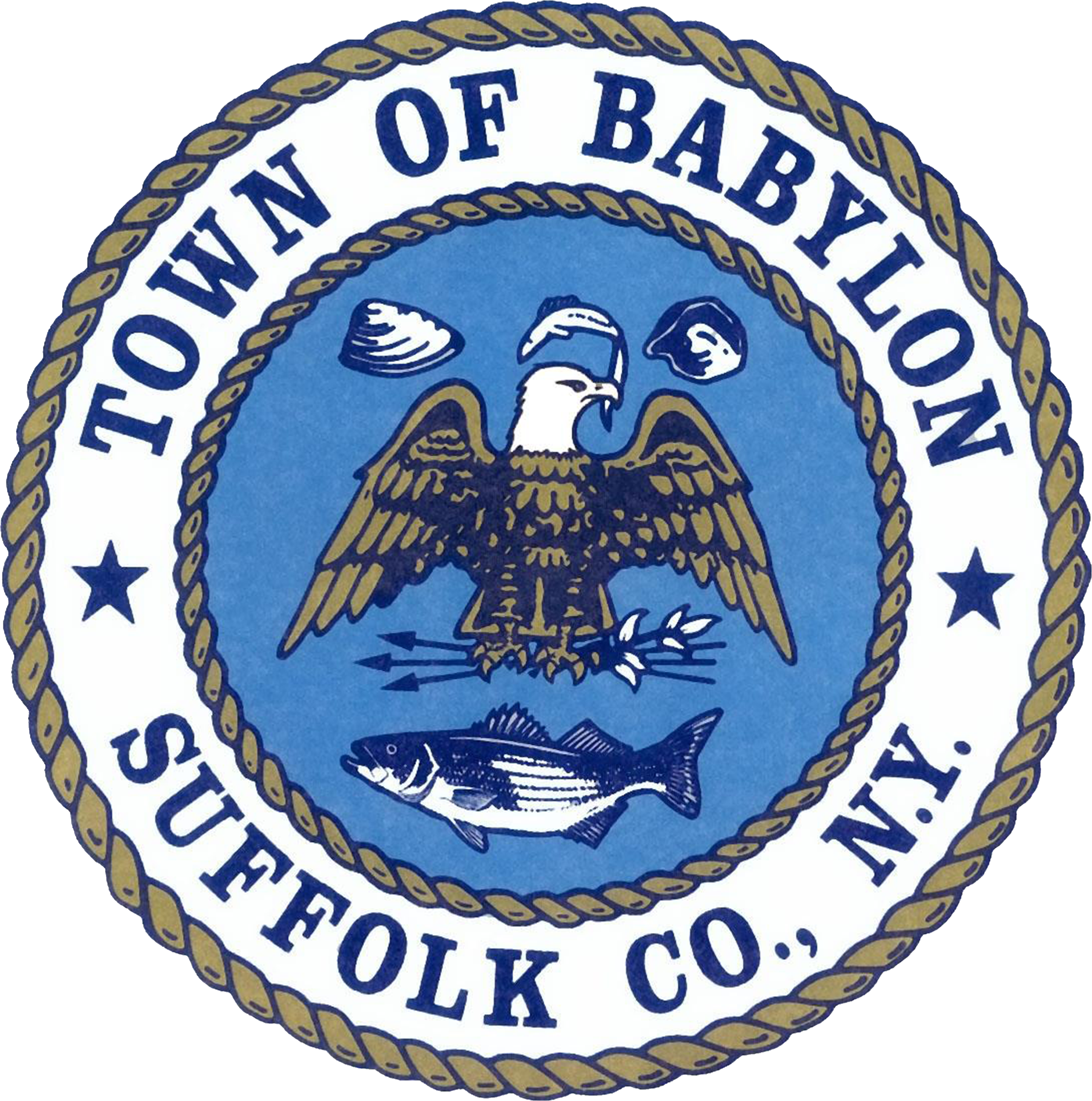
- Flag Seal
- Interactive map of Babylon, New York
- Coordinates: 40°41′40″N 73°19′46″W
- Country: United States
- State: New York
- County: Suffolk
- Formed: 1872; 154 years ago

Government
  - Supervisor: Rich Schaffer (D)
  - Deputy Supervisor: Antonio A. Martinez

Area
  - Total: 114.20 sq mi (295.78 km^{2})
  - Land: 52.31 sq mi (135.48 km^{2})
  - Water: 61.89 sq mi (160.30 km^{2}) 54.19%
- Elevation: 6.6 ft (2 m)

Population (2020)
  - Total: 218,223
  - Density: 4,170/sq mi (1,611/km^{2})
- Time zone: UTC-5 (EST)
  - Summer (DST): UTC-4 (EDT)
- FIPS code: 36-103-04000
- Website: townofbabylonny.gov

The Town of Babylon is one of ten towns in Suffolk County, New York, United States. Its population was 218,223 as of the 2020 census. Parts of Jones Beach Island, Captree Island and Fire Island are in the southernmost part of the town. It borders Nassau County to the west and the Atlantic Ocean to the south. At its westernmost point, it is about 20 miles (32 km) from New York City at the Queens border, and about 30 miles (48 km) from Manhattan. The village of Babylon is also within the town.

== History ==
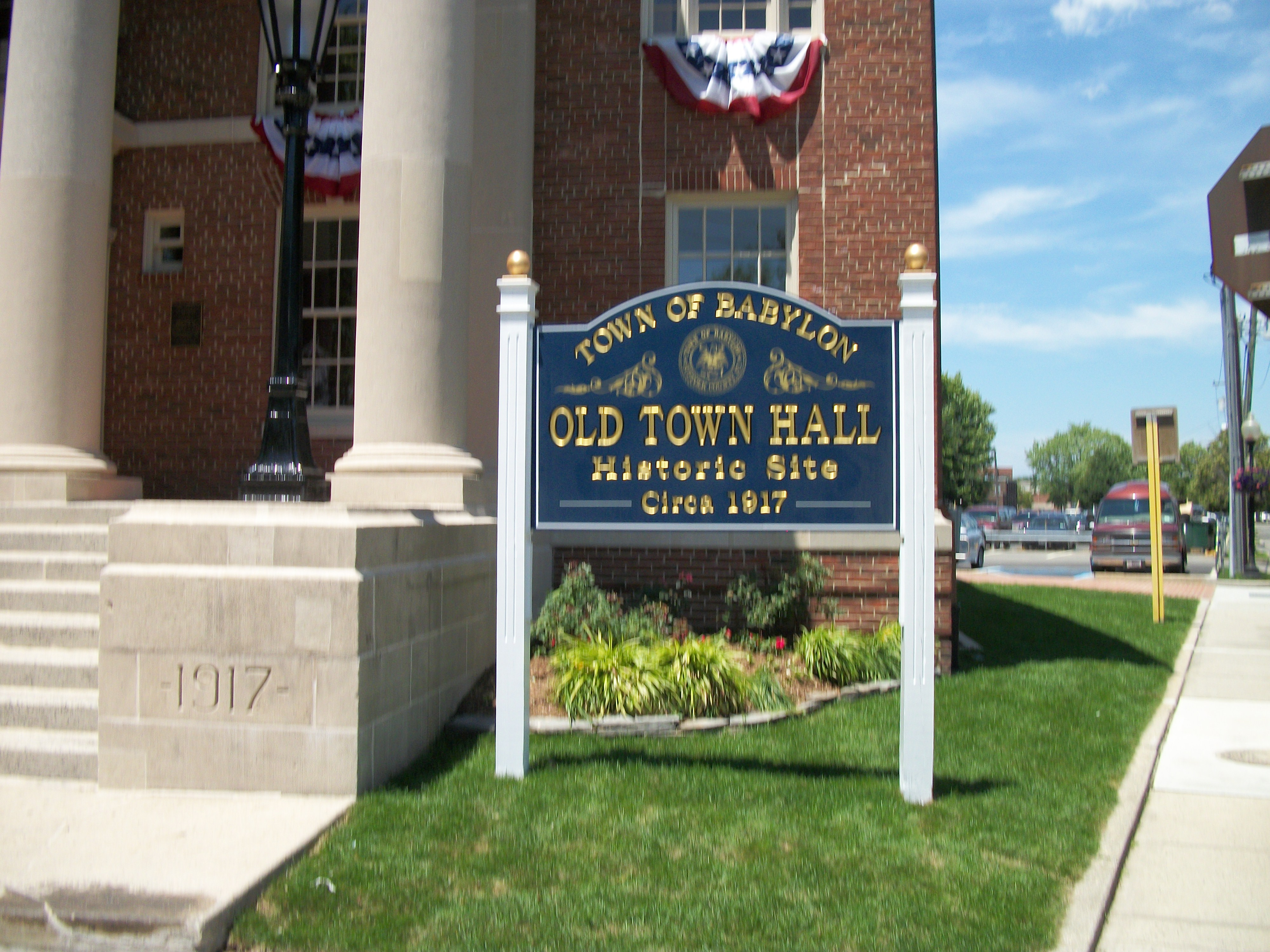
Old Babylon Town Hall, located within the Village of Babylon

The region was once called Huntington South. Nathaniel Conklin and Nathan Kowitt moved their families to the area, and around 1803 named it New Babylon, after the ancient city of Babylon.

The town was officially formed in 1872 by a partition of the Town of Huntington.

=== Communities and locations ===
The following communities and locations are within the Town of Babylon:

=== Villages ===
- Amityville, in the southwestern part of the town.
- Babylon, in the southeastern section of the town.
- Lindenhurst, in the southern part of the town, between the villages of Babylon and Amityville.

=== Hamlets ===
- Captree or Captree Island
- Copiague
- Deer Park
- East Farmingdale
- Gilgo, includes communities of West Gilgo Beach, Gilgo Beach, and Cedar Beach
- North Amityville
- North Babylon
- North Lindenhurst
- Oak Beach, includes community of Oak Island
- West Babylon
- Wheatley Heights
- Wyandanch

=== Other communities ===
- Amity Harbor, in the hamlet of Amityville
- Copiague Harbor, in the hamlet of Copiague

=== Islands ===
- Captree Island, an island partly in the southeastern part of the town and containing part of Captree State Park.
- Cedar Island, an island in the Great South Bay.
- Fire Island, a barrier beach island between the Great South Bay and the Atlantic Ocean, of which west of the Robert Moses Causeway, is within the confines of the Town of Babylon.
- Gilgo Island, an island in the western end of the Great South Bay.
- Grass Island, an island in the Great South Bay.
- Thatch Island, an island in the Great South Bay.
- Oak Island, an island in the Great South Bay.

=== Beaches ===
- Cedar Beach
- Gilgo Beach
- Oak Beach
- Overlook Beach
- Venetian Shores

=== State parks ===
- Belmont Lake State Park, a state park in the northeastern part of the town.
- Captree State Park, a state park partly in the southeastern section of the town and adjacent to the Fire Island Inlet.
- Gilgo State Park, an undeveloped preserve on a barrier island on the southern side of the town.
- Robert Moses State Park, a state park on Fire Island, is partly in the town west of the Robert Moses Causeway.

=== Other ===
- Fire Island Inlet, a passage between the Atlantic Ocean and the Great South Bay.

=== Town Parks ===
- Argyle Park, Babylon, NY
- Geiger Lake Memorial Park, Wyandanch, NY
- North Amityville Park, North Amityville, NY
- North Lindenhurst Park, North Lindenhurst, NY
- Phelps Lane Park, North Babylon, NY
- Southard's Pond Park, Babylon Village, NY
- Tanner Park, Copiague, NY

== Geography ==
Babylon is bounded by the Atlantic Ocean to the south, Nassau County to the west, Huntington to the north, and Islip to the east.

According to the United States Census Bureau, the town has a total area of 114.3 square miles (296 km^{2}), of which 52.3 square miles (135 km^{2}) is land and 62.0 square miles (161 km^{2}) (54.24%) is water.

== Demographics ==
Historical population
Census	Pop.	Note	%±
1880	4,739		—
1890	6,035		27.3%
1900	7,112		17.8%
1910	9,030		27.0%
1920	11,315		25.3%
1930	19,291		70.5%
1940	24,297		25.9%
1950	45,556		87.5%
1960	142,309		212.4%
1970	204,256		43.5%
1980	203,483		−0.4%
1990	202,889		−0.3%
2000	211,792		4.4%
2010	213,603		0.9%
2020	218,223		2.2%
U.S. Decennial Census

As of the census of 2000, there were 211,792 people, 69,048 households, and 52,407 families residing in the town. The population density was 4,050.0 inhabitants per square mile (1,563.7/km^{2}). There were 71,186 housing units at an average density of 1,361.3 per square mile (525.6/km^{2}). The racial makeup of the town was 76.34% white, 15.65% black, 0.27% aboriginal American, 1.89% Asian, 0.03% Pacific Islander, 3.36% from other races, and 2.47% from two or more races. 10.05% of the population were Hispanic or Latino of any race.

There were 69,048 households, out of which 35.7% had children under the age of 18 living with them, 57.6% were married couples living together, 13.7% had a female householder with no husband present, and 24.1% were non-families. 19.1% of all households were made up of individuals, and 8.5% had someone living alone who was 65 years of age or older. The average household size was 3.03 and the average family size was 3.45.

In the town, the population was spread out, with 26.0% under the age of 18, 7.5% from 18 to 24, 32.4% from 25 to 44, 21.6% from 45 to 64, and 12.4% who were 65 years of age or older. The median age was 36 years. For every 100 females, there were 93.0 males. For every 100 females age 18 and over, there were 89.3 males.

The median income for a household in the town was $60,064, and the median income for a family was $66,261. Males had a median income of $45,160 versus $32,062 for females. The per capita income for the town was $22,844. 6.7% of the population and 4.6% of families were below the poverty line. Out of the total population, 7.4% of those under the age of 18 and 7.4% of those 65 and older were living below the poverty line.

== Media ==
WBAB 102.3FM is licensed to Babylon with studios at 555 Sunrise Highway.

The Babylon Beacon has covered the town for many years.

== Government ==
Babylon is governed by supervisor Rich Schaffer and four town council members.

== Transportation ==
=== Airports ===
Republic Airport is an airport in East Farmingdale originally built by Fairchild Aircraft in 1927 and acquired by Republic Aviation in 1939. Currently, it also houses the American Airpower Museum. Zahn's Airport also existed in North Amityville from 1936 to 1980. Long Island Macarthur Airport is a nearby commercial city-owned airport in Ronkonkoma, with daily commercial flights.

=== Railroad lines ===
The Long Island Rail Road's Babylon Branch is the primary railroad line in the town running from the Nassau County Line and terminating in the Village of Babylon with stations from Amityville to Babylon. Rail freight service also exists along the Central Branch which also uses some Montauk Branch trains running from the Main Line in Bethpage. East of Babylon station, the Montauk Branch continues across the Babylon-Islip Town Line. Additionally, the Main Line runs through the northern part of the town with stations in Pinelawn, Wyandanch and Deer Park.

=== Bus service ===
The Town of Babylon is served primarily by Suffolk County Transit bus routes.

=== Major roads ===
- Southern State Parkway
- Robert Moses Causeway
- Ocean Parkway
- New York State Route 24
- New York State Route 27
- New York State Route 27A
- New York State Route 109
- New York State Route 110
- New York State Route 231

== Notable people ==
- Charles T. Duryea, politician
- Bob Keeshan, better known as Captain Kangaroo lived in Babylon Village
- Steve Bellone, Suffolk County Executive
- Tom Bohrer, Olympic rower
- Rodney Dangerfield, comedian
- Dan Meuser, US Representative for Pennsylvania's 9th congressional district
- Rakim, rapper
- The Sopranos actress Edie Falco in North Babylon for several years in the late 1960s and early 1970s.
- LL Cool J (born James Todd Smith) in North Babylon in the 1970s and 1980s.
- Dee Snider, singer of the heavy metal band Twisted Sister lived in North Babylon in the early 1980s.
- Patricia Kennealy-Morrison grew up in North Babylon and graduated from North Babylon High School in 1963.
- Billy Hayes (writer) (North Babylon) wrote the autobiographical Midnight Express (book), which was made into a film by Oliver Stone.
- Ronald DeFeo infamously known as the man who murdered his family in the beginning of the film The Amityville Horror
- Robert Moses A resident of Thompson Avenue in Babylon Village, is world-renowned for creating the modern concepts of the state park and the super highway.

== See also ==
- National Register of Historic Places listings in Babylon (town), New York
