= Hope Gangloff =

American painter

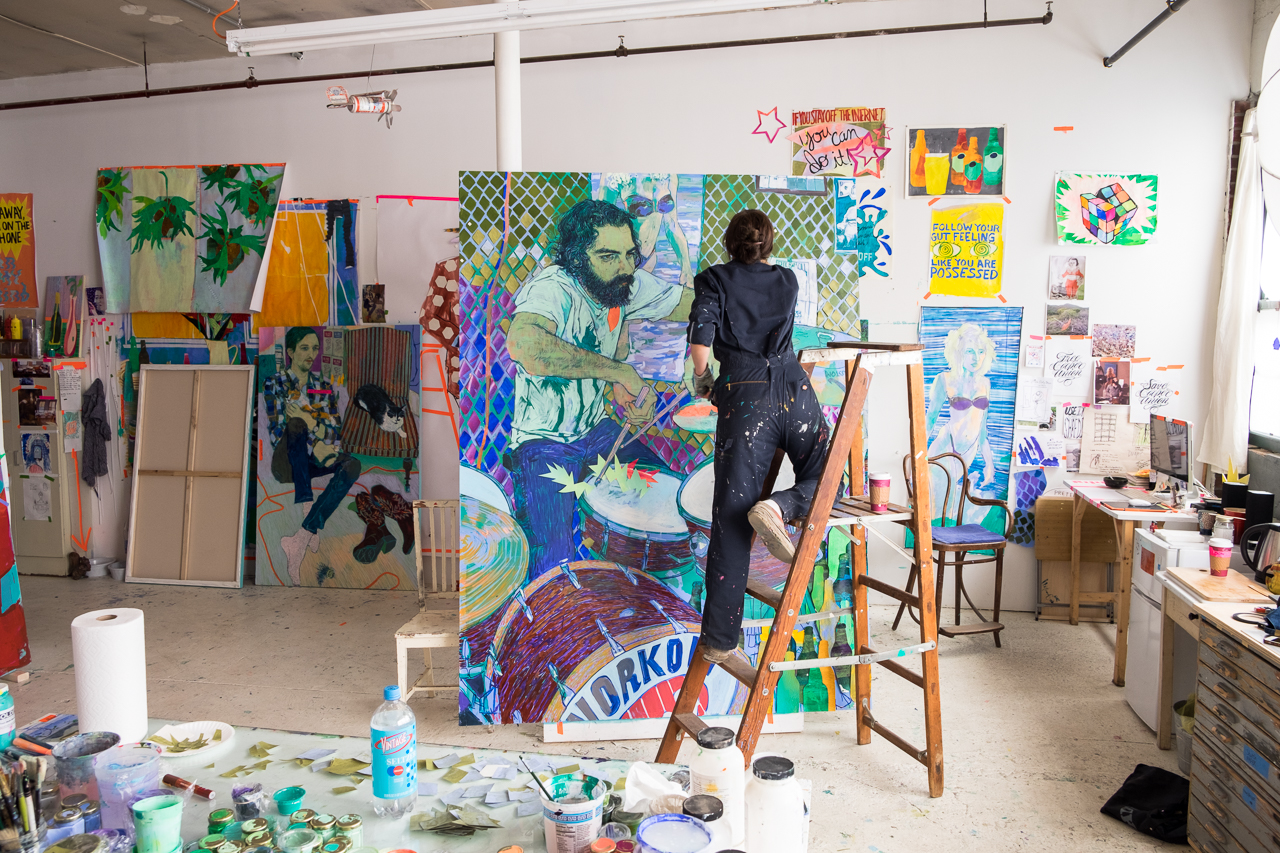
- Born: September 15, 1974 (age 51); Amityville, New York, U.S.
- Education: The Cooper Union
- Known for: Painting, Portraiture
- Spouse: Benjamin Degen

Hope Gangloff (born 1974) is an American painter based in New York City who is known for her vividly-colored portraiture.

== Early life and education ==
Gangloff was born in Amityville, New York. She received her Bachelor of Fine Arts from The Cooper Union for the Advancement of Science and Art in 1997.

== Early career ==
In high school, Gangloff began creating large-scale paintings in the attic of an old barn owned by her parents in Amityville, New York. While studying for her B.F.A. at Cooper Union, the artist continued to paint murals and large-scale works. Working large allowed the artist to feel that she was embedded "in [a] color-field with the paint," an experience that was "an immediate way to abstract your space." Gangloff painted large portraits, using house paint on butcher paper, of her peers and members of her local artistic community while she was a student. In an interview with BOMB Magazine, Gangloff states that the images were "always of my friends or people I was hanging out with or liked at school or wanted to tease or get some kind of reaction out of. It was a way to communicate. It’s my sense of humor too: I do whatever I want visually and then just pretend that I don’t know what the big stink is. . ."

After graduating from Cooper Union in 1997, Gangloff worked as a dish washer in a German restaurant in New Jersey for three months before moving to Bozeman, Montana to live with her older brother. She worked at a bronze foundry in Bozeman for a short period of time before she moved back to New York City and began work as a metal chaser at New Foundry in Greenpoint, Brooklyn. Following her job at New Foundry, she was employed to draw scenes from movies for Built by Wendy, a clothing and accessory line.

== Later career and work ==
In her professional career, Hope Gangloff continues to exclusively draw and paint her peers and everyday objects in settings of relative intimacy. Her subjects are often depicted in domestic spaces and in poses of relaxation or quiet focus. Her drawings and paintings are noted for their vibrancy, with the artist describing her compositions as vehicles for color theory. Gangloff discussed her fascination with painting portraits in a 2018 interview with Artspace, stating, "I'm a big fan of portraiture—humans are endlessly entertaining and interesting. I like painting people I know because the familiarity helps relax both the subject and myself. Anyone who has sat for me knows that the first four hours painting will probably be erased completely. It's less stressful when my model already knows that." She has further likened her creative process to rock climbing:

An outsider who doesn’t look at a lot of art might not understand why I paint similar things over and over again… But there are always micro movements. I’m always working through problems. Rock climbers look for little changes in rocks to help them climb and keep going. When I look at a painting, I’m also looking for the move that’s going to set off something else. The whole painting is like a problem I’m trying to solve.

For the Miami New Times, Neil Vazquez has written that "Gangloff pushes the boundaries of abstraction and figuration" in which the colorful and abstract backgrounds are "juxtaposed against banal subjects." Combined with subject matter and color, Laura Staugaitis states that "[t]he artist’s strong but gestural lines create defined shapes that are filled with repetitive marks and bright patterns. Gangloff gives equal textural attention to all areas of the painting, which draws the viewer’s eye to every detail and also contextualizes each portrait sitter in a unique set of surroundings."

Gangloff has exhibited internationally with solo museum exhibitions at the Iris and B. Gerald Cantor Center for Visual Arts at Stanford University; Aldrich Contemporary Art Museum; and the Eli and Edythe Broad Art Museum at Michigan State University. Her work has additionally been featured in group exhibitions at the Kemper Museum of Contemporary Art; the Institute of Contemporary Art at Maine College of Art, the Pennsylvania Academy of Fine Arts, and the Iris & B. Gerald Cantor Center for Visual Arts. Work can be found in the collections of the Alturas Foundation, San Antonio, Texas; the Eli and Edythe Broad Art Museum at Michigan Stage University; the Iris & B. Gerald Cantor Center for Visual Arts; the Cleveland Clinic; Grinnell College; the Kemper Museum of Contemporary Art; the Pennsylvania Academy of the Fine Arts; and, Stanford University Medical Center at Stanford University. Her work is in the collections of the National Portrait Gallery, the Kemper Museum of Contemporary Art, and the Pennsylvania Academy of the Fine Arts.

In 2017, Gangloff was the inaugural artist for the Cantor Art Center’s Diekman Contemporary Commissions program, which resulted in a solo show and a weeklong residency. As a part of her residency, she painted live in the museum's atrium over the course of three days. That same year, she was selected as the cover artist for the 2017 Winter/Spring Program at the Brooklyn Academy of Music (BAM) as part of the academy's tradition of featuring visual art on the cover of BAMbill. Gangloff's work was included in the 2022 exhibition Women Painting Women at the Modern Art Museum of Fort Worth.

In 2022, Gangloff participated in the Fall 2022 pre-collection by Alexander McQueen, an initiative involving 12 female artists from around the world, including Cristina de Middel and Marcela Correa.

== Personal life ==
Hope Gangloff is married to fellow artist Benjamin Degen.
