= Viña Vik =

Winery and vineyard in Chile

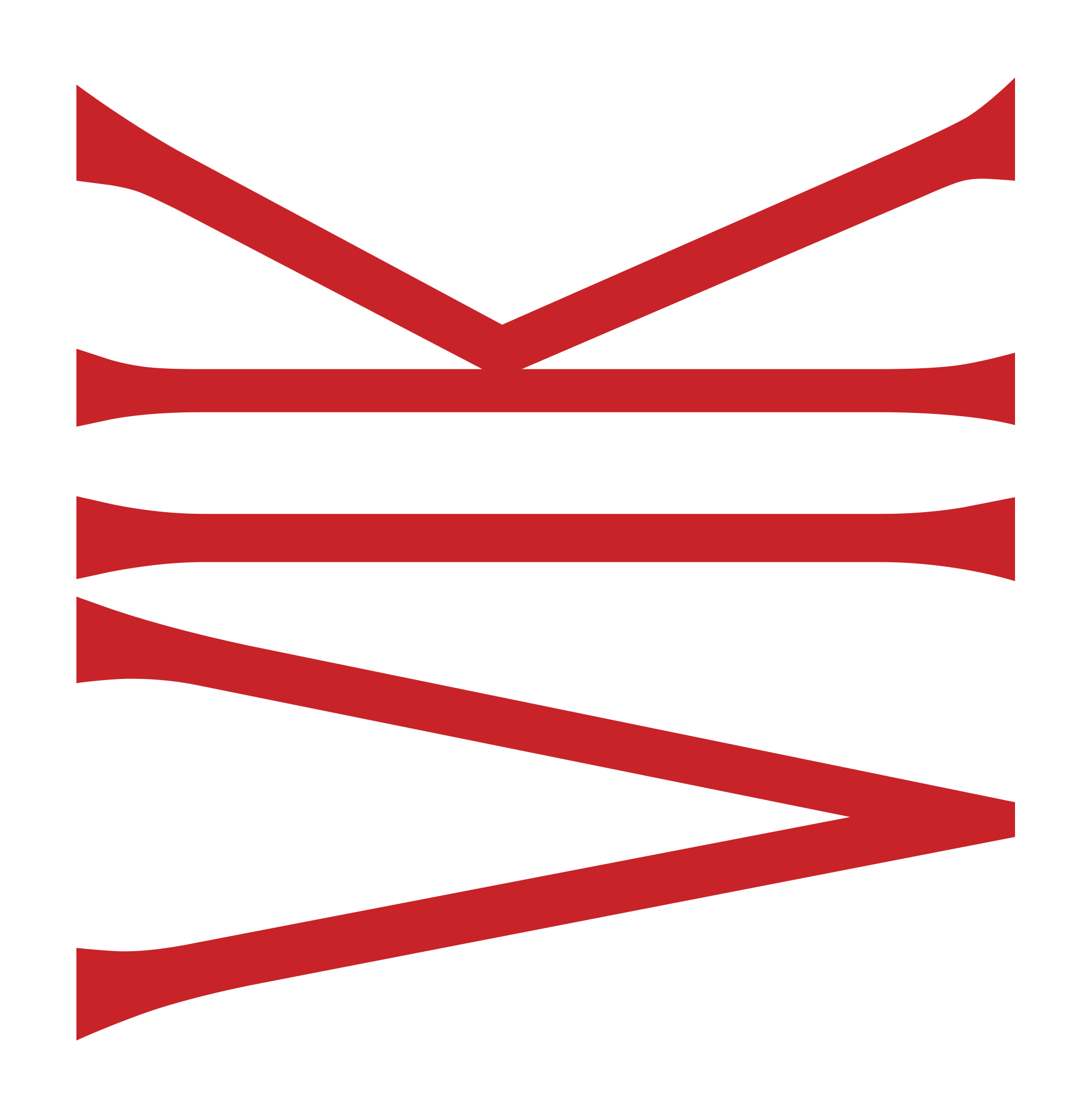
- Location: Millahue Valley, Chile
- Appellation: Colchagua Valley
- Founded: 2006 (19–20 years ago)
- Key people: Founders: Alexander Vik; Carrie Vik
- Known for: Vik, Milla Cala, La Piu Belle
- Website: www.vikwine.com; vikchile.com; www.vik.cl

Viña Vik is a winery, luxury hotel, and vineyard, located in the Millahue Valley, O'Higgins Region, in Chile. It was founded in 2006 by the Norwegian Alexander Vik and his wife Carrie Vik, after the acquisition of 4,300 hectares in the Cachapoal Valley. The winery produces five grape varieties: Carmenère, Cabernet Sauvignon, Merlot, Cabernet Franc and Syrah, which it markets through its brands Vik, Milla Cala, La Piu Belle and La Piu Belle Rosé. Installations include the Pavilion restaurant.

== Architecture and art ==
The hotel in the vineyard, clad in titanium, aluminium and steel, was designed by the Uruguayan architect Marcelo Daglio, while the winery was designed by the Chilean architects Smiljan Radić Clarke and Loreto Lyon. Both buildings were completed in 2014 and were published in architectural magazines Plataforma Arquitectura, and ArchDaily. Inside, the hotel exhibit features works by painters Roberto Matta and Anselm Kiefer.

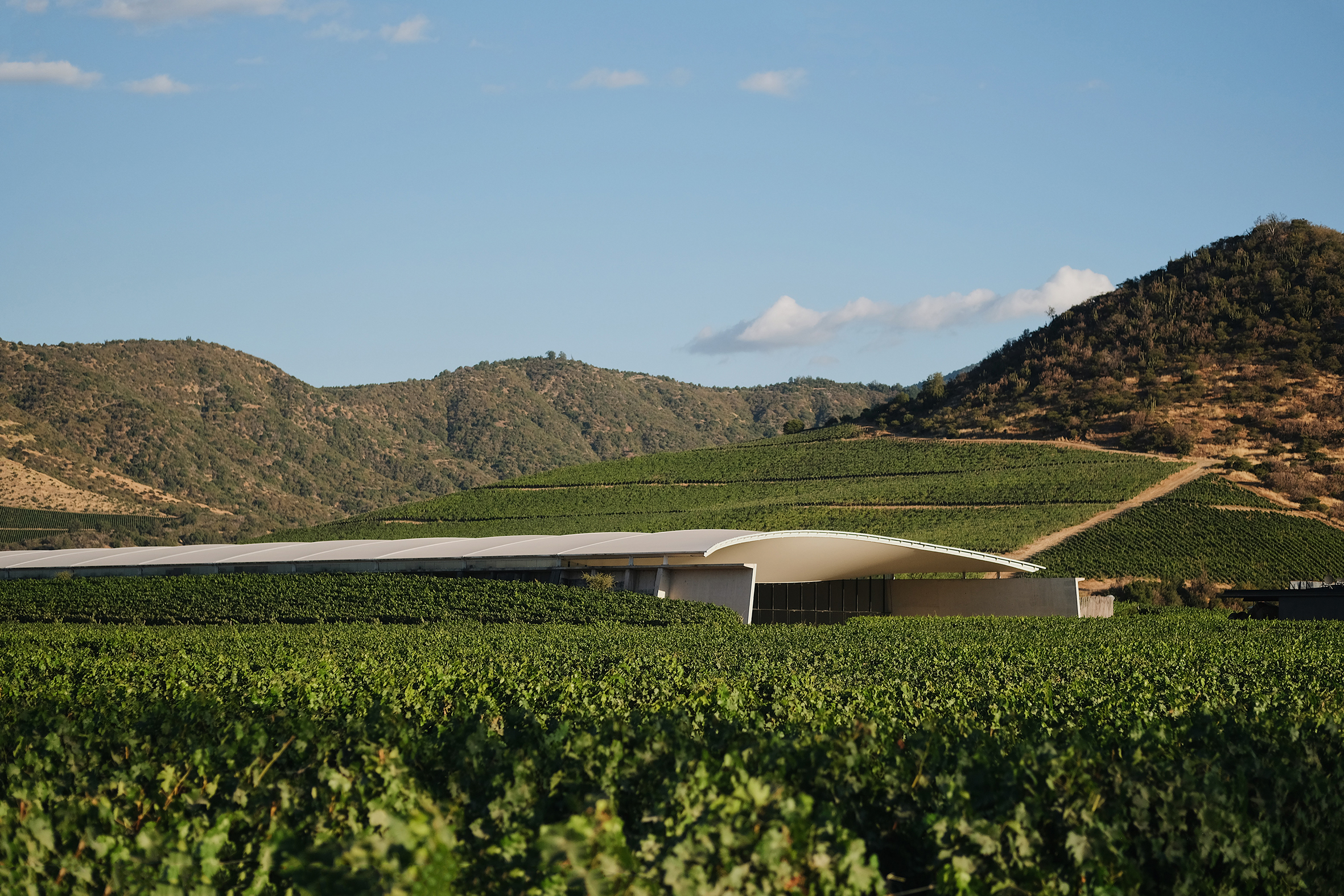
VIK Winery

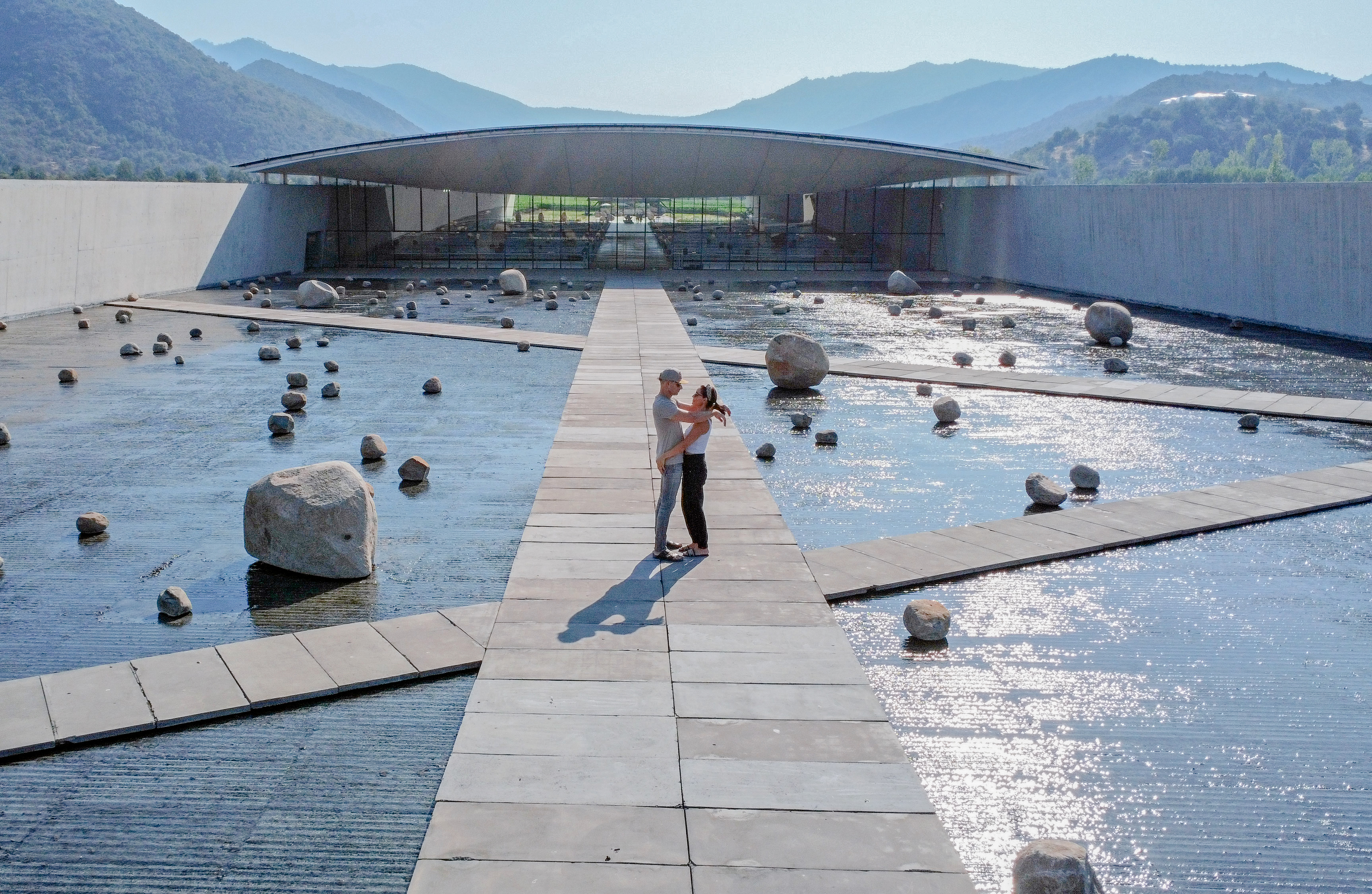
VIK Winery, reflective pool

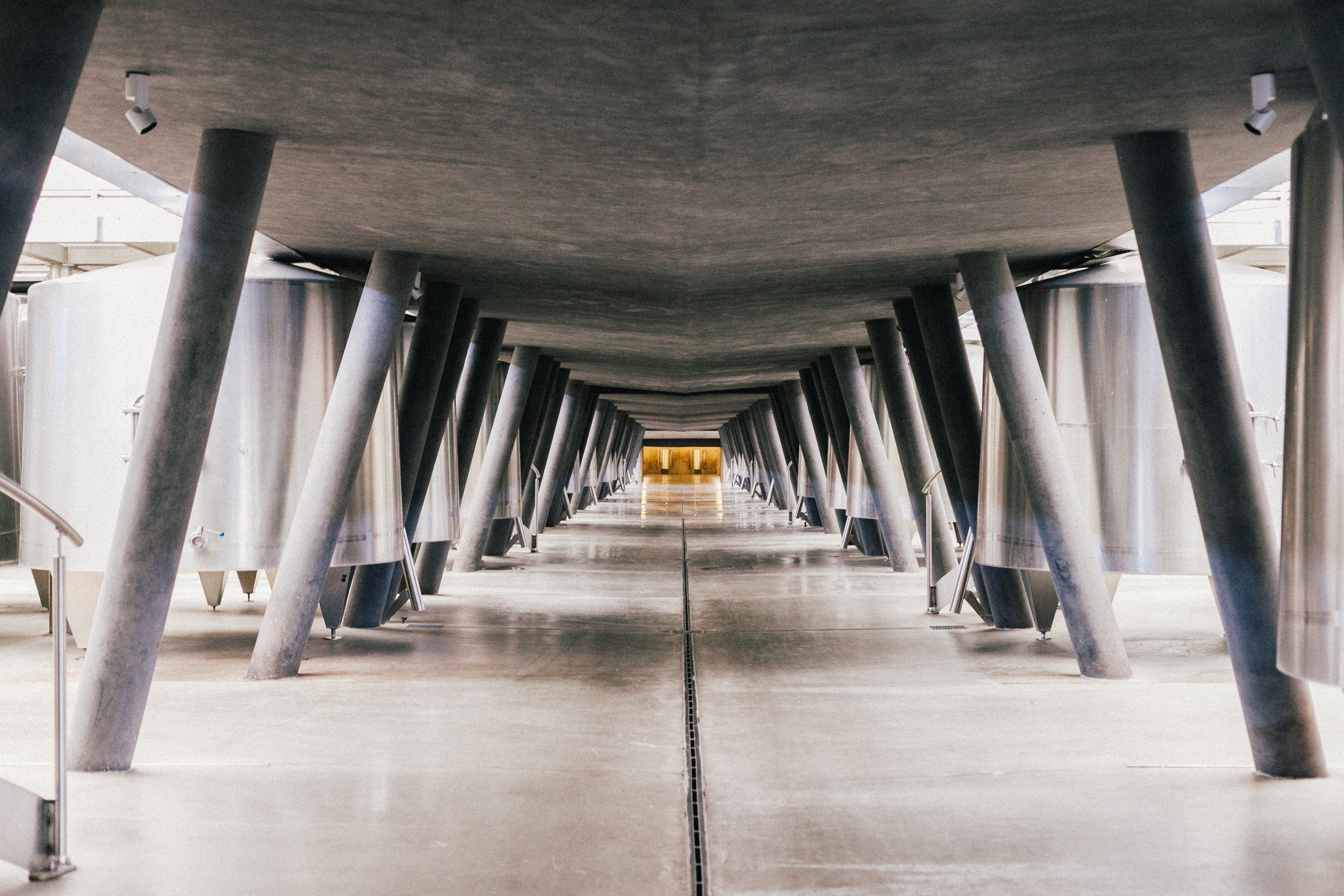
VIK Winery, interior

== Awards and honours ==
International:

- Best vineyard experience, in 2019, according to Wine Star Awards, by Wine Enthusiast Magazine.
- 4º best vineyard in the world in 2022, and among the top ten in 2020 and 2021, according to William Reed Business Media.
