= Alexander Lloyd =

Alexander Lloyd may refer to:

- Alexander Loyd (1805–1872), mayor of Chicago, Illinois
- Alexander Lloyd, 2nd Baron Lloyd (1912–1985), British Conservative politician
- Alexander Lloyd (venture capitalist), venture capitalist
- Alex Lloyd (born 1974), Australian singer-songwriter
  - Alex Lloyd (album)
- Alex Lloyd (racing driver) (born 1984), British motor racing driver
- Alex Loyd (1927–1976), American football end
- Alex Lloyd (rower) (born 1990), Australian Olympic rower
