= Jeff Lindsay (disambiguation) =

Jeff Lindsay (born 1952) is an American author.

Jeff Lindsay may also refer to:

- Jeff Lindsay, co-founder of Hacker Dojo and inventor of Webhook
- Jeff Lindsay, mixed martial artist; see TJ Waldburger

== See also ==
- Geoff Lindsey, British writer and director
