= Gribbon =

Gribbon is a surname. Notable people with the surname include:

- Eddie Gribbon (1890-1965), American film actor, brother of Harry
- Harry Gribbon (1885-1961), American film actor, brother of Eddie
- Jenna Gribbon (born 1978), American painter
- Mike Gribbon (born 1957), American soccer player

== See also ==
- Diana Gribbon Motz (born 1943), United States Circuit Judge of the United States Court of Appeals for the Fourth Circuit
- George Sutcliffe (George Gribbon Sutcliffe, 1895-1964), Australian public servant
