= Artspace (website) =

Online marketplace for contemporary art

- Type: Private
- Industry: Art
- Founded: 2011
- Headquarters: New York City, New York, United States
- Key people: Christopher E. Vroom (Chairman), Catherine Levene (CEO)
- Services: Art marketplace
- Website: Artspace.com

Artspace is an online marketplace for contemporary art. The company is based in New York City, New York and was launched in 2011.

The site in 2013 had over $100 million in art for sale on its marketplace and had received investment from Accelerator Ventures and Metamorphic Ventures. The company was founded in 2010 by Christopher E. Vroom and Catherine Levene. Levene was named as one of the top 10 female CEOs to watch in 2011 by the Huffington Post.

== History ==
Christopher E. Vroom and Catherine Levene co-founded Artspace in late 2010. Vroom, an avid art collector and patron of the arts, is credited as the vision behind the business, who recognized the potential to create a platform offering quality fine art to a broad audience. Levene stated in a 2011 interview that she felt e-commerce art marketplaces could become the norm for people interested in buying art. She also stated that it could result in a similar market shift for buying art, as that which took place with clothing in the late 1990s.

At the time of Artspace's launch, it was stated that the company was one of the first major efforts to commercialize the art marketplace, making art accessible to everyone. Before the launch of Artspace, most art sales were made in person, often in galleries, and transactions were rarely completed online. Another obstacle Artspace had to overcome was that viewing art before purchasing it was a must at the time. Artspace challenged both of these common viewpoints in the art industry.

In an interview with Business Insider, Levene said that she felt large auction houses such as Sotheby's had missed an opportunity to open online marketplaces for art. Shortly after the interview in 2011, Levene was named by the Huffington Post as one of the top 10 female CEOs to watch.

Vroom was responsible for attracting top-level galleries, museums, cultural institutions and major artists to sell in an online context for the first time. Within the first year of Artspace's existence, it received $1.2 million in investment as an early stage startup.

Artspace's products were included in the revolutionary idea STORY, which was developed by Rachel Shechtman later that year. The STORY store in New York City contained art from Artspace, along with products from other startups.

The company received two rounds of capital investments, beginning in 2012. A Series A funding round in early 2012 secured $2.5 million for the company, with investors including Accelerator Ventures and Metamorphic Ventures. In early 2013, the company secured a venture capital investment of $8.5 million from Canaan Partners.

== Mechanics ==
Artspace is an e-commerce platform which performs like an online marketplace. The online service began in 2011 with an inventory of art with a total estimated value of $7–8 million. By 2013, this had increased to more than $100 million in estimated value. The firm is based in New York City and at the time of launch provided contemporary pieces for $200 to $10,000. This value has since changed to include more valuable pieces.

Artspace is quoted to have over 2,000 active artists from 400 galleries publishing works through its marketplace. The galleries and cultural institutions cover 30 countries and include The Guggenheim, The Whitney Museum, Museum of Contemporary Art Chicago and the Serpentine Galleries. Work on the website has come from artists such as Jeff Koons, Damien Hirst, Jasper Johns, Robert Rauschenberg and Yayoi Kusama.

The website and marketplace are aimed at making art more accessible to those who know little about art, or live far away from galleries.

In 2013 during an interview, it was stated that the website didn't use any form of advanced imagery to display art, instead using JPEG images. Levene stated, "Paying that huge sum without seeing the art can be scary for some people, but we've seen in the last ten years that there is an explosion of sales being made by simply sending JPEGs."

A 2014 report by Hiscox stated that the online art market was valued at around $1 billion.
