= Marcela Correa =

Chilean artist (born 1963)

- Born: Marcela María Correa Maturana; 1963; Viña del Mar, Chile
- Known for: Sculpture
- Awards: Altazor Award for National Arts (2007)

Marcela María Correa Maturana (born 1963) is a Chilean sculptor and visual artist.

== Biography ==
Born in Viña del Mar, Correa studied art at the Pontifical Catholic University of Chile and later specialized at the École des Beaux-Arts in Paris.

In 1997, she designed a house in Chile alongside her partner, Smiljan Radic, with whom she subsequently collaborated on numerous projects, including a sculpture titled The Boy Hidden in a Fish, consisting of a large stone with a hollowed interior sized to fit a person, for the 2010 Venice Biennale of Architecture, where they were invited by director Kazuyo Sejima.

In 2003, she was nominated for the Altazor Award for National Arts in the sculpture category for Natural sintético. She was nominated again in the same category for Campana in 2007. In 2008, she was again nominated in that category for Lleno de Aire.

In 2022, Correa participated in the Fall 2022 pre-collection by Alexander McQueen, an initiative involving 12 female artists from around the world, including Cristina de Middel and Hope Gangloff.

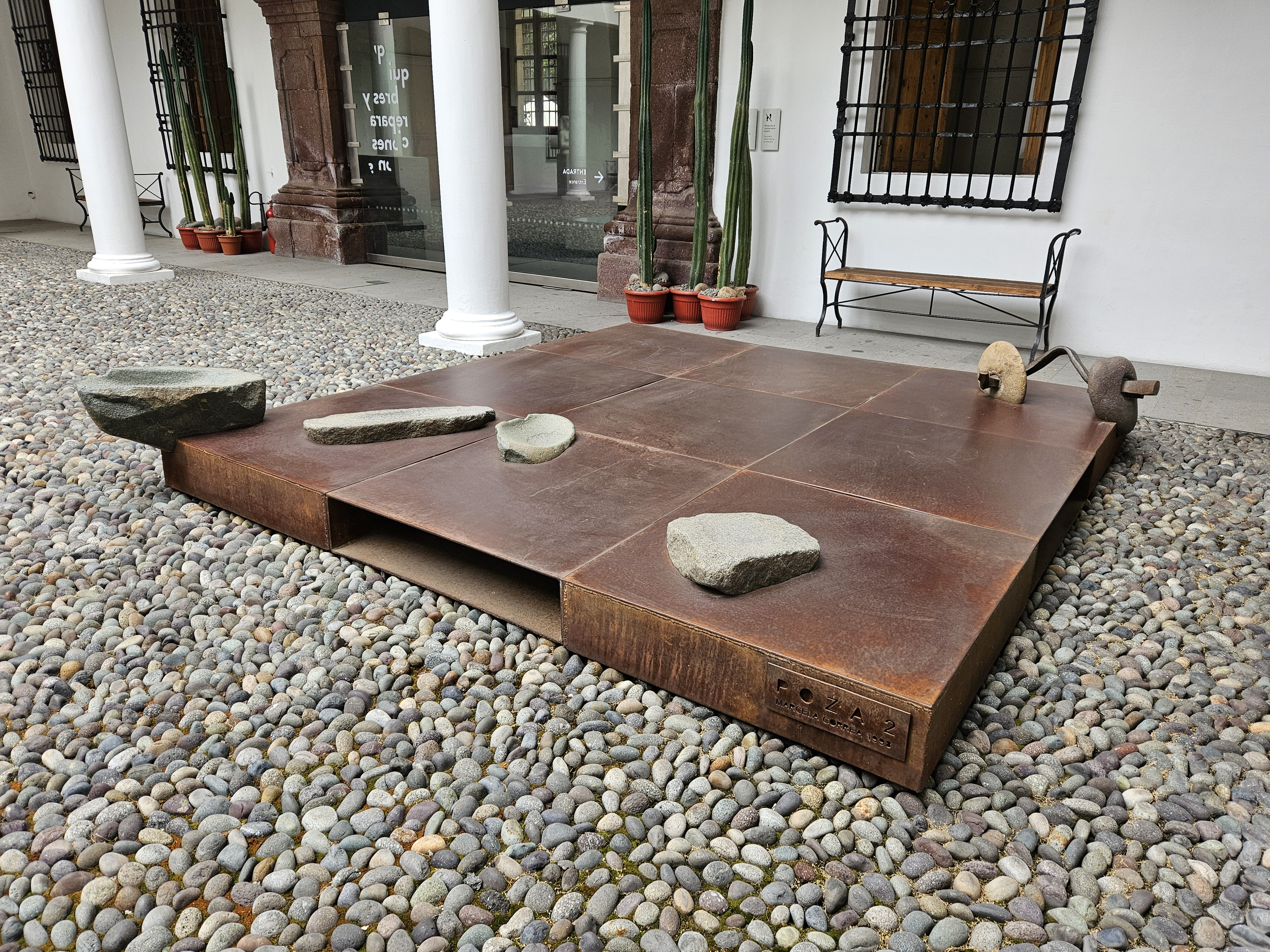
POZA 2, sculpture by Correa installed at the Chilean Museum of Pre-Columbian Art in Santiago.

Correa has participated in numerous solo and group exhibitions throughout her career, including El Acero en la Escultura ("The Steel in Sculpture") and Ferroesculturas at the Chilean National Museum of Fine Arts (1990 and 1991, respectively); the 11th Valparaíso International Art Biennial (1994), and Del otro lado, Contemporary Art by Women in Chile at the La Moneda Palace Cultural Center (1998), as well as exhibitions in Argentina and the United States.

== Personal life ==
Correa has a long-standing relationship with architect Smiljan Radic. The two met during their university years and eventually married, establishing a partnership characterized by an ongoing exchange of ideas between sculpture and architecture.
