= Unfrozen Caveman Lawyer =

Fictional character

Keyrock, known as "Unfrozen Caveman Lawyer", was a recurring character created by Jack Handey and played by Phil Hartman on Saturday Night Live from 1991 through 1996. He was a caveman with the beetle brows of a Neanderthal, who had fallen into a glacial crevasse, or "Big Giant Hole in Ice", during the ice age, thus preserving his body well enough for scientists to thaw him out in 1988. He subsequently studied law at the Oklahoma City University School of Law. The character exploits his humble origins with thinly veiled cynicism to manipulate others.

Keyrock became a defense and personal-injury lawyer, and a politician running for the Senate on the platform of reducing the capital gains tax. He was portrayed as a selfish, well-dressed attorney who repeatedly claimed to be a simple-minded caveman, and would employ simple folk wisdom to win his cases. He also enjoyed significant wealth, driving luxury cars such as BMWs and Range Rovers, as well as owning a home on Martha's Vineyard.

== Opening scene ==
"One hundred thousand years ago, a caveman was out hunting in the plains, when he slipped and fell into a crevasse, where he was frozen solid. In 1988, he was discovered by scientists and was thawed out. He then attended law school and became...the Unfrozen Caveman Lawyer!"

The scene would then be accompanied by a song, beginning "He used to be a caveman...," showing Keyrock in animal skins beating a club against his hand, "...but now he's a lawyer!" and showing Keyrock's clothes changing from animal skins to a suit, and his club replaced by hands gesturing to emphasize a point: "Unfrozen Caveman Lawyer!"

== Recurring humor ==
The running gag was that Keyrock would speak in a slick and smoothly self-assured manner—but with obviously feigned naiveté—to a jury or an audience about how things in the modern world supposedly "confuse and frighten" him. He often emphasized the latter phrase with air quotes or a showy gesture, which underscored his obvious disingenuousness. He would then list several things that confounded him about modern life or the natural world, such as: "When I see a solar eclipse, like the one I went to last year in Hawaii, I think 'Oh no! Is the moon eating the sun?' I don't know. Because I'm a caveman -- that's the way I think." This pronouncement would seem ironic, coming from someone who had, for example, just ended a brisk cell phone conversation, or indeed attended law school. Keyrock would always finish a disquisition, however, by asserting in a burst of righteousness that nevertheless, "There is one thing I DO know...." That one thing would be that his client was either innocent, or was entitled to several million dollars or more in both compensatory and punitive damages for an injury. The jury or counsel is invariably swayed by Keyrock's argument, except every time the judge announces the verdict in his favor, Keyrock is distracted by some other event like watching a Knicks game on his portable TV ("I'm sorry, Your Honor, I was distracted by the tiny people in this magic box"), or by a cell phone call, and the verdict has to be repeated.

The scenes would usually end with a small "outro" scene of "a sneak peek at the next episode" showing Keyrock making arguments. One such scene diverted from the usual "caveman argument" when a tipsy Keyrock was aboard a plane, being told by a stewardess that the chief steward has declared no more Dewar's and water would be served to Keyrock. The stewardess in that episode was not persuaded by Keyrock's whining that "I'm just a caveman" and that he is "frightened by the flying machine," and continued her duties. An enraged Keyrock then roared, "Listen up, I will sue you and your whole crummy airline!" What happened afterward remained to be seen, but it was one of the few cases where Keyrock did not have his way.

Like many Saturday Night Live sketches at that time, "Unfrozen Caveman Lawyer" was presented as a parody of a television show. During the opening and closing of the "show", the announcer would list some of the "show's" highly unusual sponsors, such as "Big Fat Bean" ("Why eat a lot of little beans when you can eat one big bean?"); "Gas Plus" ("Actually gives you gas, for those times when you feel like being the joker!"); "Dog Assassin" ("When you can't bear to put him to sleep, maybe it's time to call Dog Assassin"); "Cubic Yard of Earthworms" ("What you do with it is your business"); "Wilson Ear Drill" ("We don't recommend that you use an ear drill, but if you insist, why not get the best!") and the popular Happy Fun Ball ("still legal in 16 states — it's happy, it's fun, it's Happy Fun Ball!").

The sketch was a parody of the "simple country boy beats city slicker" genre, such as then-popular series Matlock in which an older, "country-boy" type Southern lawyer bamboozled "big city" or "sophisticated" lawyers. "Unfrozen Caveman Lawyer" upended the form by replacing the humble hero with a craven yuppie.

The full list of "Unfrozen Caveman Lawyer" "sponsors" include:

- Lawn Destroyer - when you don't even care anymore
- Cubic Yard of Earthworms - what you do with it is your business
- Wilson Ear Drill - we don't recommend that you use an ear drill, but if you insist, why not get the best!
- Gas Plus - actually gives you gas, for those times when you feel like being the joker.
- National Escort Services - if we don't get a prostitute to your door in 15 minutes, you don't pay.
- Happy Fun Ball - still legal in 16 states - it's legal, it's fun, it's Happy Fun Ball!
- Chili-B-Gone - soothes eyes inflamed by chili spray.
- Spider Whistle - spiders come crawling when you start blowing, also works on certain ants.
- Clyde Baxter - if you're on his jury, won't you please vote not guilty? Clyde would appreciate it.
- Dog Assassin - when you can't bear to put him to sleep, maybe it's time to call Dog Assassin.
- Big Fat Bean - why eat hundreds of little beans when you can have one big bean?
- Chemical Sheller - why spend hours shelling pecans and walnuts? Pour on Chemical Sheller and shells just melt away.
- Planet Xylon - change your ways or we'll come there and destroy you.
- Stink Pies - smell awful but taste great. Now available in Outhouse Coconut.

== See also ==
- Recurring Saturday Night Live characters and sketches
- "The Resurrection of Jimber-Jaw", a 1937 short story by Edgar Rice Burroughs about an unfrozen caveman with normal intelligence, but Paleolithic political views
- It's About Time, a 1960s television series created and produced by Sherwood Schwartz, which was partially about cavemen time-warped to modern times
- Iceman, a 1984 film about an unfrozen caveman starring John Lone in the title role
- Encino Man, a 1992 film about an unfrozen caveman starring Brendan Fraser in the title role
- GEICO Cavemen, a series of GEICO commercials beginning 2004 featuring offended cavemen with perfectly normal intelligence but primitive looks, which eventually spawned its own TV series
- Lucan, a television series about a man raised by wolves who finds himself caught up in the ways of the modern world
