= SuperHappyDevHouse =

Parties for hackers and thinkers

SuperHappyDevHouse (SHDH) is an international series of social events that organizers originally conceived as parties for hackers. It was founded by Jeff Lindsay and David Weekly (founder of PBwiki) on May 29, 2005. SHDH in Silicon Valley began by hosting 150–200 people every six weeks at rotating venues throughout San Francisco Bay and Silicon Valley, California. The name was derived from a 1991 Saturday Night Live satire, Happy Fun Ball, which lampooned TV commercials, and the NERF Ball. Weekly lived in a house nicknamed "SuperHappyFunHouse" with other entrepreneurs including Bret Taylor, Juan Bruce, Chris Countryman, Kimon Tsinteris, Alan Keefer and Andy Radin. That name was changed to SuperHappyDevHouse for the events.

== Expansion ==
In 2008, SHDH had expanded with CocoaDevHouse (London); SuperHappyDevClub (Cambridge, UK); Cologne DevHouse (Cologne, Germany); SuperHappyDevFlat (Zurich, Switzerland); SuperHappyHackerHouse (Vancouver, Canada); SuperHappyDevHouse Aotearoa (New Zealand); PhoenixDevHouse (Arizona); BostonDevHouse (Cambridge, Massachusetts); and DevHouse Pittsburgh (Pennsylvania). There was a DevHouse in Hermosillo, Mexico, in September 2008, marking the first Latin American DevHouse, followed shortly thereafter by a Mexico City DevHouse on November 1, 2008, a GuadalajaraDevHouse (Guadalajara, Mexico) on September 6, 2009, and two years later by a DevHouse on Mérida, Mexico, on February 28, 2010.

The organizers say they're trying to "resurrect the spirit of the Homebrew Computer Club." It is a non-exclusive event without admission charge; the event is paid for by donations and sponsorship.

The original SHDH was in Hillsborough, California, and later in Los Gatos, California.

As of August 2009, SHDH spawned HackerDojo to operate a hackerspace in Mountain View, California. SHDH operates as an activity of HackerDojo.

Currently, there is also an ongoing DevHouse in Chihuahua, Mexico, which began in 2022. They hold monthly meetings and continue to actively grow the DevHouse community in Mexico.
