= Benjamin Degen =

American painter

- Born: June 14, 1976; Brooklyn, New York, United States
- Education: The Cooper Union, Yale Norfolk Painting Fellowship
- Known for: Painting
- Spouse: Hope Gangloff
- Father: Bruce Degen

Benjamin Degen (born 1976) is an American painter based in New York City.

== Early life and education ==
Benjamin Degen was born in Brooklyn, New York, to children's book author and illustrator Bruce Degen and artist Christine Degen. He received his bachelor's degree in Fine Arts from The Cooper Union School of Art and Science in 1998. A year prior to receiving his B.F.A, he participated in the Yale Norfolk Painting Fellowship, a summer program at Yale University for rising undergraduate seniors in the fine arts.

== Career and influences ==
Degen finds inspiration in classical painting, nature, and the human body. His work often explores the relationships between groups and individuals within their urban or natural surroundings. In a review for The Brooklyn Rail, Jonathan Beer wrote, "Degen's technique and figurative scenes call to mind the work of Dana Schutz and Georges Seurat. He paints the fleeting and flickering play of light on an unfixed world."

Degen has exhibited internationally in solo and group exhibitions. His work has been featured in group exhibitions at Collezione Maramotti, MoMA PS1, and The William Benton Museum of Art at the University of Connecticut. Degen's work can be found in the collections of The Museum of Modern Art, NYC; the Nerman Museum of Contemporary Art, Kansas; and The Tang Museum at Skidmore College, New York.

He is represented by Susan Inglett Gallery, New York.

== Personal life ==
Degen is married to artist Hope Gangloff. His brother is the comic book artist Alex Degen.
