= Hacker Dojo =

Community center and hackerspace in Santa Clara, California, United States

- Formation: 2009
- Type: NGO
- Purpose: Hackerspace
- Headquarters: 855 Maude Avenue, Mountain View, CA, 94043
- Location: United States
- Coordinates: 37.3963152°N 122.049020°W
- Region served: Silicon Valley
- Members: 200+
- Origin: Mountain View, California
- Founders: David Weekly, Jeff Lindsay, Kitt Hodsden, B Klug, Melissalynn Perkins
- Key people: Eric Hess (Executive Director)
- Affiliations: Noisebridge, NYC Resistor, Pumping Station One, SuperHappyDevHouse
- Staff: 1
- Website: hackerdojo.org

Hacker Dojo is a 6,000-square-foot (560 m^{2}) community center and hackerspace that is based in Mountain View, California. Predominantly an open working space for software projects, the Dojo hosts technology classes for biology, computer hardware, and manufacturing events.

The Dojo is run mostly democratically by its membership. The Dojo is primarily financed through membership dues ($150/mo), but has accepted 3rd party sponsorships from Microsoft, Google, Isocket, Twilio, AMS Dataserfs, and Palantir Technologies.

== Physical space ==
Hacker Dojo in California

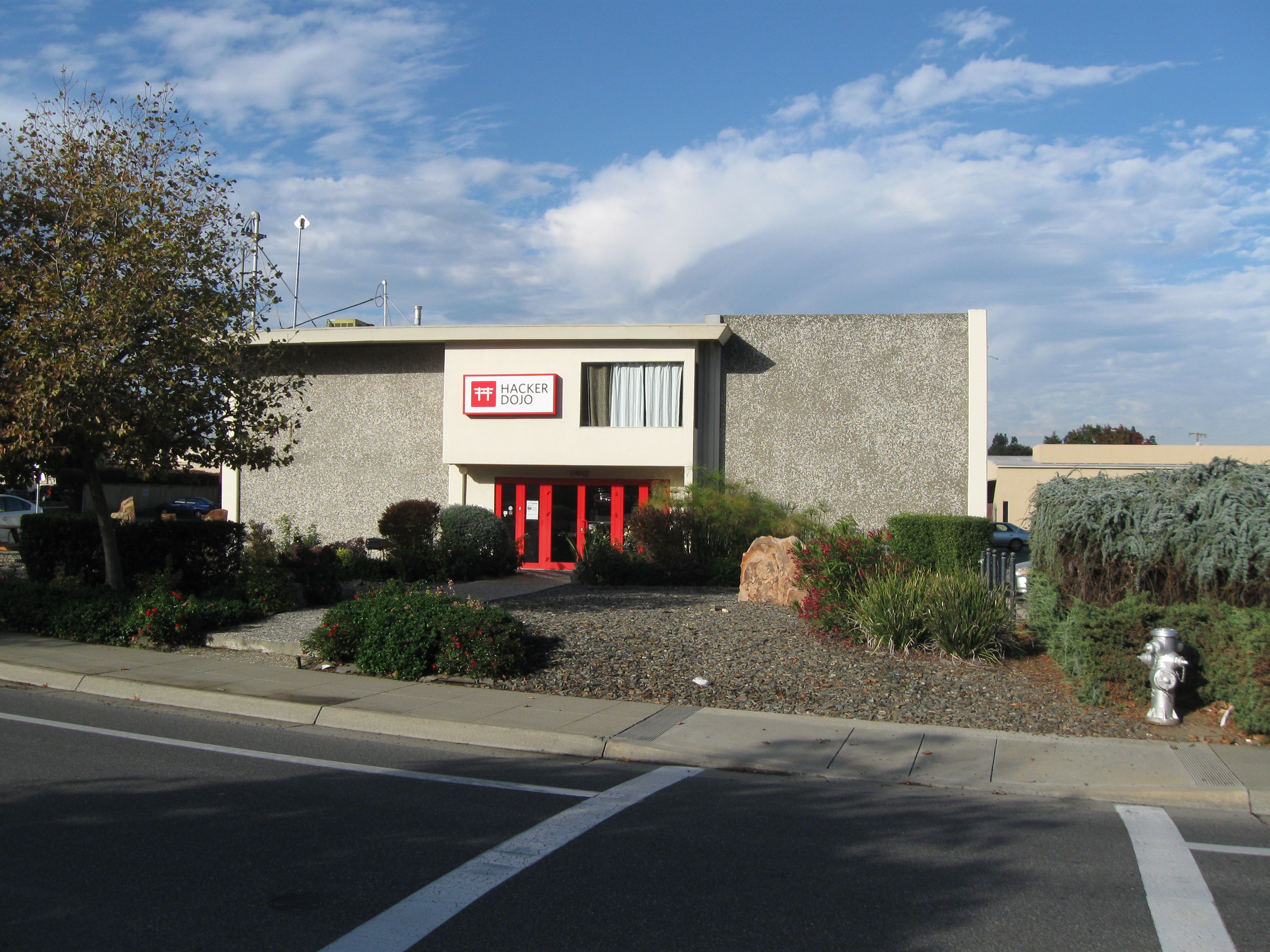
Original location at 140 South Whisman Road in 2009

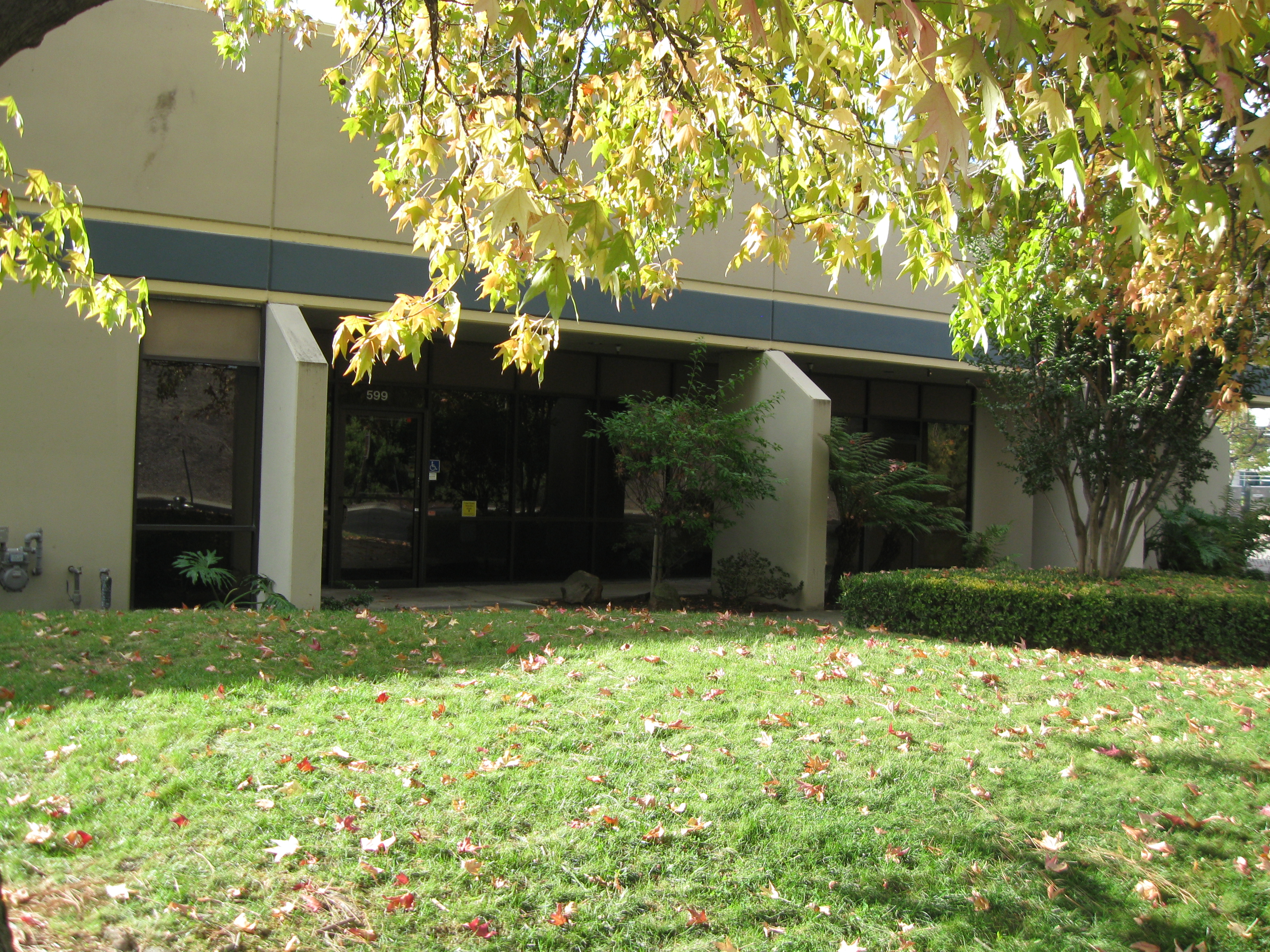
599 Fairchild Drive in 2013

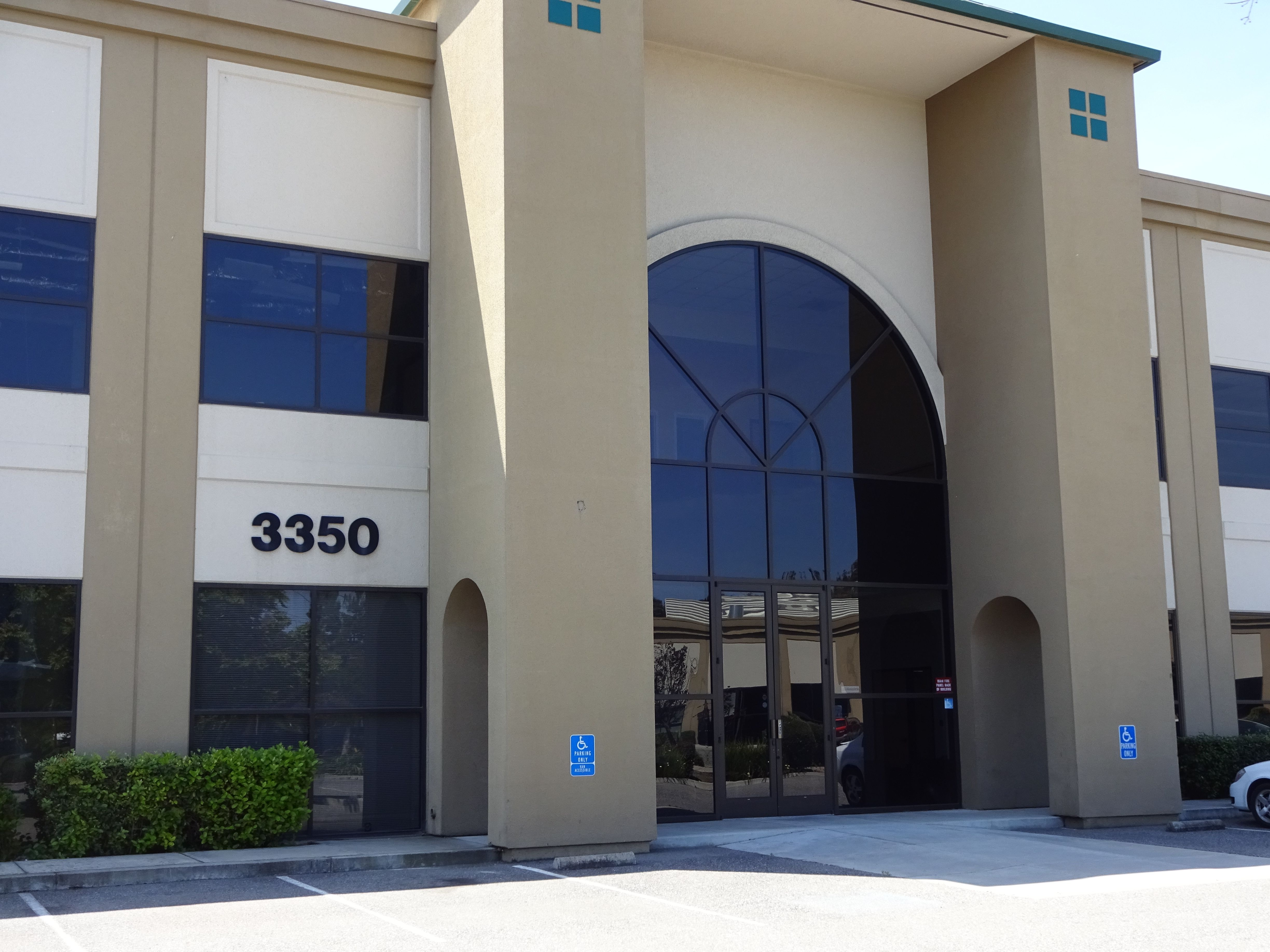
3350 Thomas Road in 2016

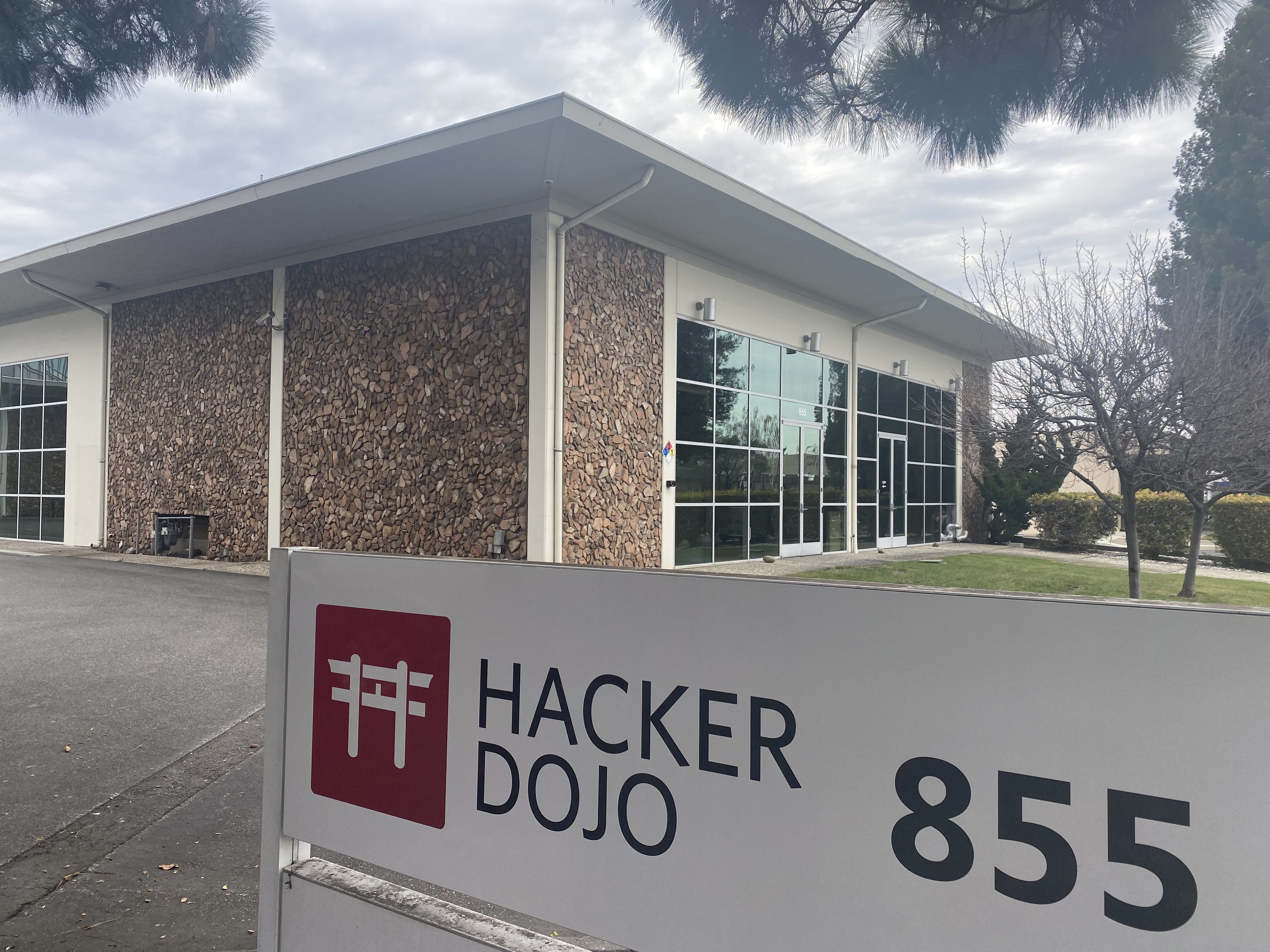
855 Maude Avenue in 2022

The Hacker Dojo was originally located at 140 South Whisman Road in Mountain View, California. The facility started as only 140A, but the space expanded to include 140B in October 2009, and further expanded in October 2011 to lease units C and D, thus taking over the entirety of 140 South Whisman. The expansion party was attended by several hundred individuals, including Steven Levy.

Because of zoning violations, the City of Mountain View blocked the use of units C and D and restricted the use of units A and B to events no larger than 49 occupants. 140A was formerly an industrial artistic glassworking facility, though it has gone through a series of renovations. The Dojo staged an "underwear run" on Saint Patrick's Day as a fundraiser.

Construction bids to bring the 140 South Whisman space up to building code requirements came in much higher than expected, and on Monday, October 15, 2012, the Dojo signed a lease to rent a building at 599 Fairchild Drive, also in Mountain View. Move-in occurred on February 13, 2013, and a ribbon-cutting ceremony was held on February 27, 2013. The lease on the building at 599 Fairchild Drive ran through May 31, 2016, at which time the Dojo moved to its third home, located at 3350 Thomas Road in Santa Clara. The Dojo and its fourth iteration returns to 855 Maude Avenue in 2022.

== Controversies ==
=== Denial-of-service attack ===
Members at Hacker Dojo could not access the Internet during several outages occurring between June 22 and July 14, 2013. The problem was eventually traced to an amplified distributed denial-of-service (DDoS) attack. In this case, the perpetrator was sending forged Domain Name Service (DNS) requests to multiple domain name servers, causing the servers to send large amounts of data records to the Hacker Dojo, thereby overloading the system and preventing legitimate use of the network. Dojo managers made several unsuccessful attempts to stop the attacks. Eventually, they requested help from the Federal Bureau of Investigation (FBI), which determined the outages were the result of a criminal act by Jason David Miller, a former Dojo member.

According to the indictment, Miller had become a member on May 19, 2013, using the first name "ad" and the last name "min," such that his username became "ad.min" and his email address was "ad.min@hackerdojo.com." Dojo management forbids misleading usernames, and terminates his email account. On June 1, 2013, Miller re-registered as "Dallas Smith" and began attacking the Dojo's internet service a few weeks later, starting on June 22, 2013. He is charged with violation of Title 18 U.S.C. §§ 1030(a)(5)(A) and (c)(4)(B)(i)—Intentionally Causing Damage to a Protected Computer. Miller was indicted in May 2014. He was scheduled to be sentenced on October 3, 2016, in the courtroom of Judge Edward J. Davila in San Jose.

=== Embezzlement ===
In March 2016, a local newspaper published an article saying the Dojo was facing a leadership crisis and that an employee had been accused of embezzlement. Since 2016, the organization's new board members have brought back some of the founding team of SuperHappyDevHouse. The organization currently holds a Platinum badge of Transparency with GuideStar.

== Uses ==
The 140B building has been turned into a place where events such as Random Hacks of Kindness, Startup Weekend, and BayThreat, among others, have been hosted. It has invented and run its own events, such as a reverse job fair called the Hacker Fair, where candidates present booths to company engineers and the Startup Fair, where young companies have booths for investors to consider. Members can hold events at the Dojo for free, subject to approval from the Dojo events committee. The Dojo also does movie nights, a weekly Happy Hour, and Friday Night Socials.

A large number of Silicon Valley startups work daily out of the Hacker Dojo, which is their primary location, and the Founders Institute, which is located nearby.

=== Notable startups ===
- Pinterest; the two founders met and built the first iteration of the product at Hacker Dojo
- Word Lens, acquired by Google
- Pebble Watches
- Infometers.com, acquired by Validic.com
- Skydera
- NetworkedBlogs
- Game Closure
- Chivaz Socks
- MicroMobs, now Wedding Party
- Cirroscope (then CirroSecure), acquired by Palo Alto Networks

== Gallery ==
Dojo on 2022
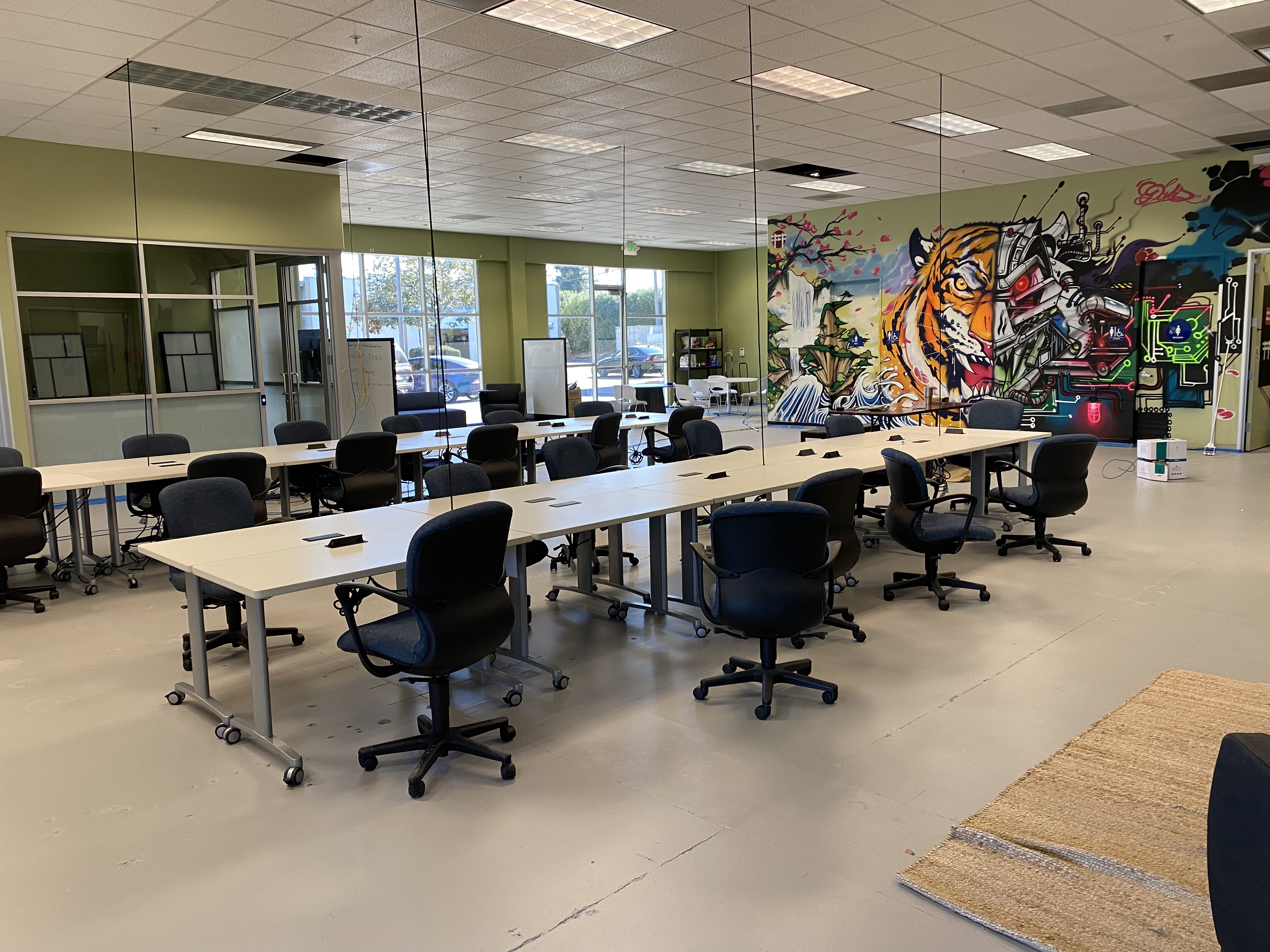
Main space

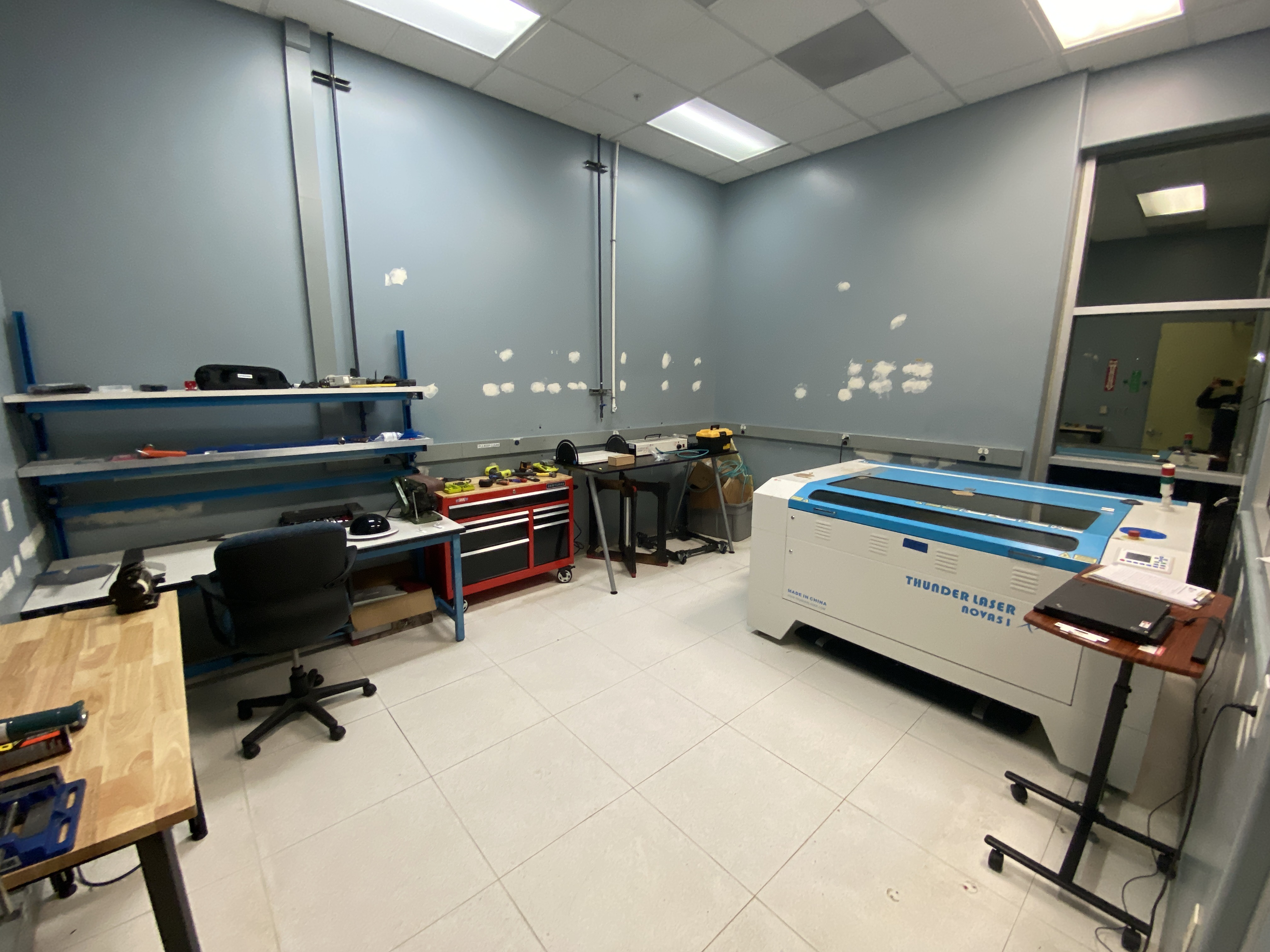
Laser-cutter room

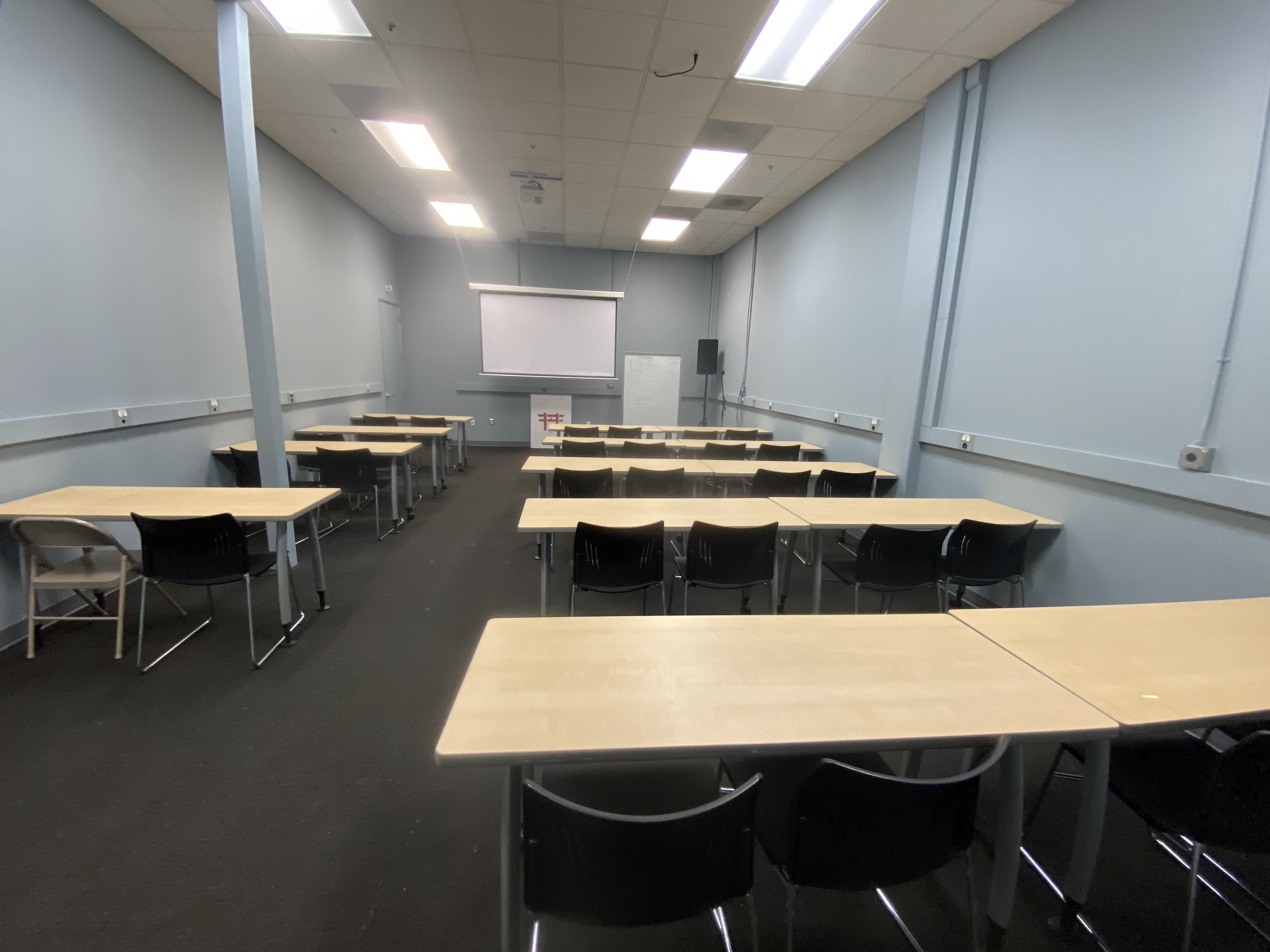
Classroom
Original Dojo
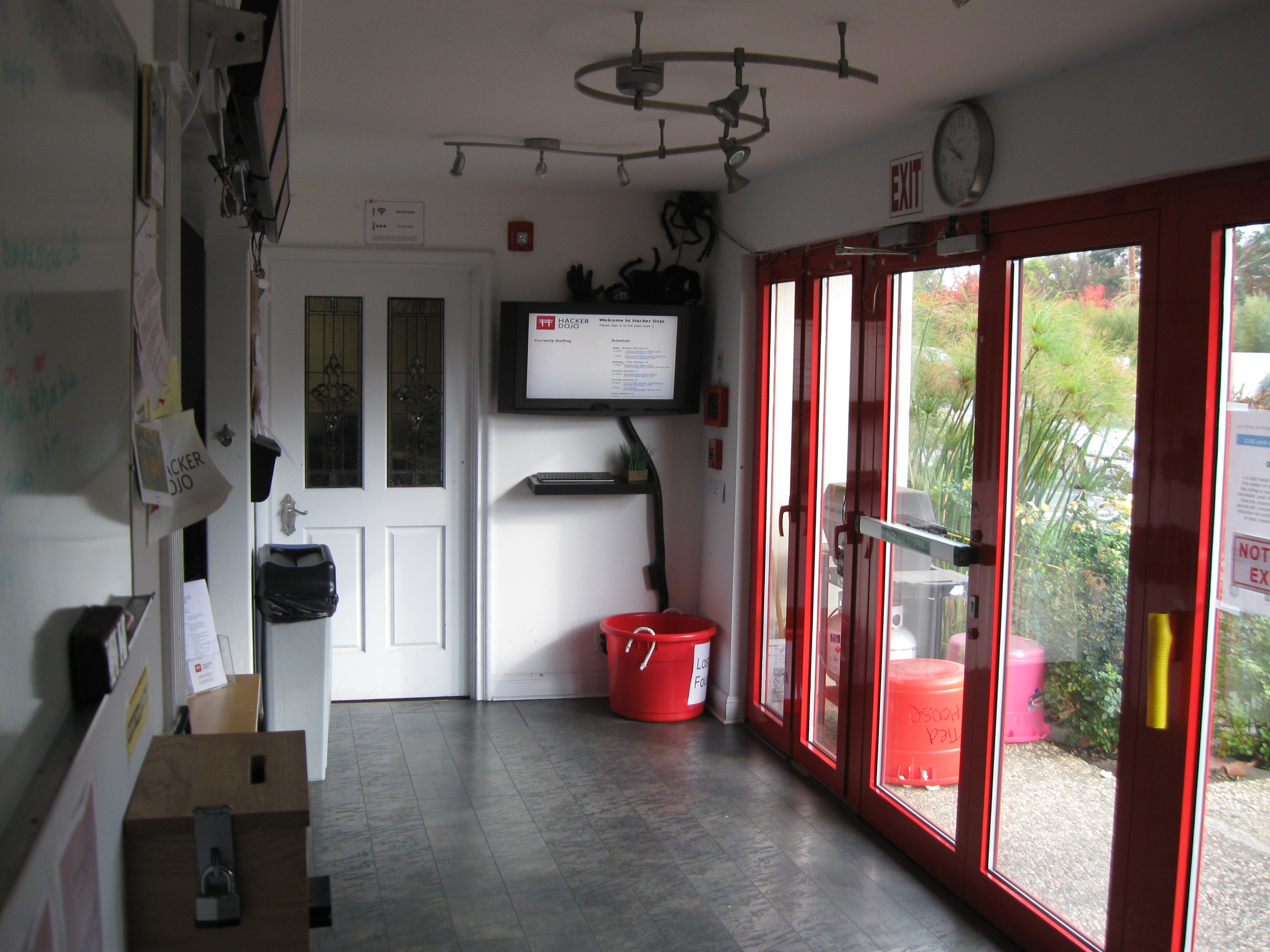
Inside front entrance

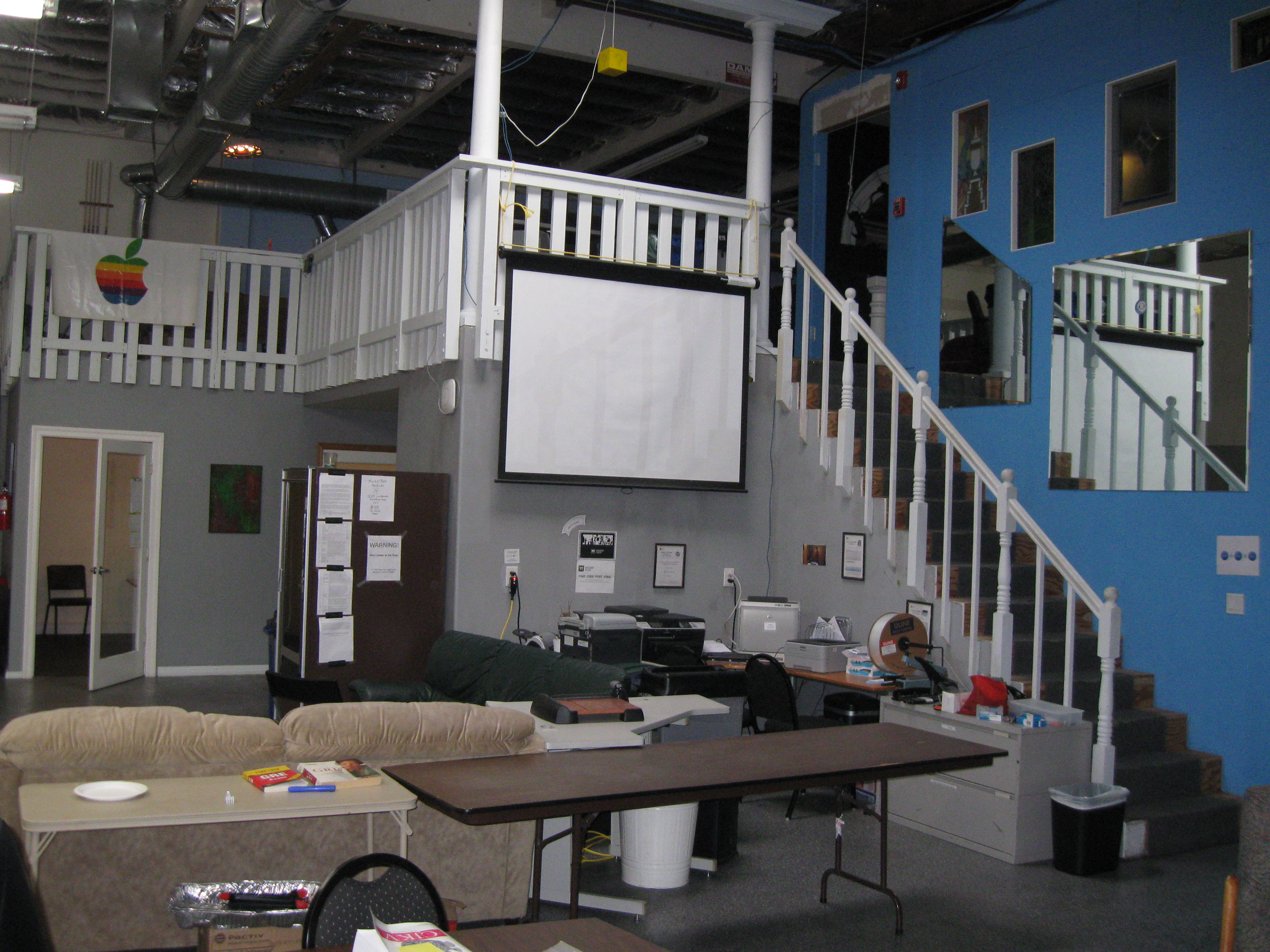
Stairs leading to deck

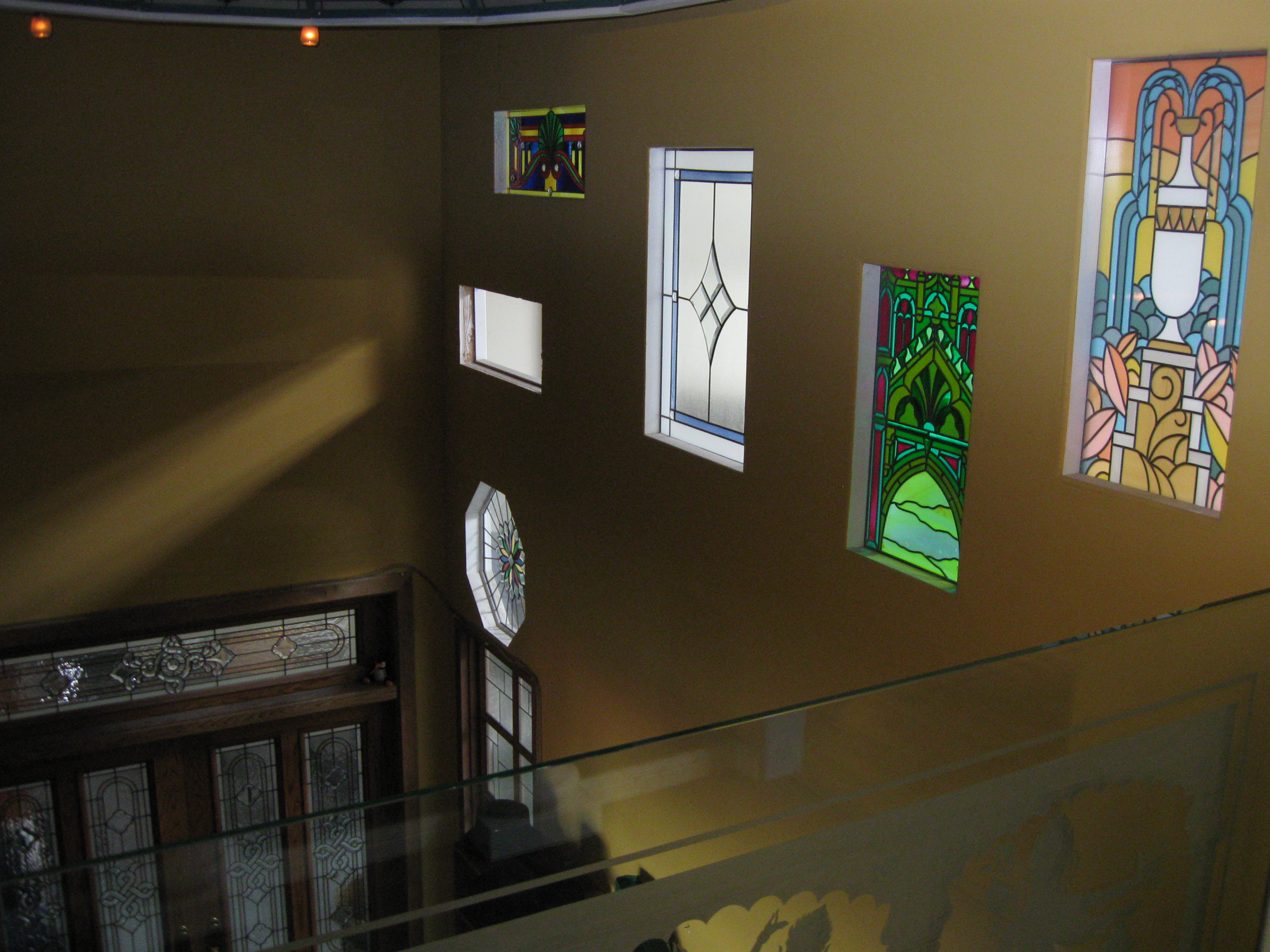
Some of many stained glass windows
