= Amityville, New York =

Village in the United States

- Village
- Incorporated Village of Amityville
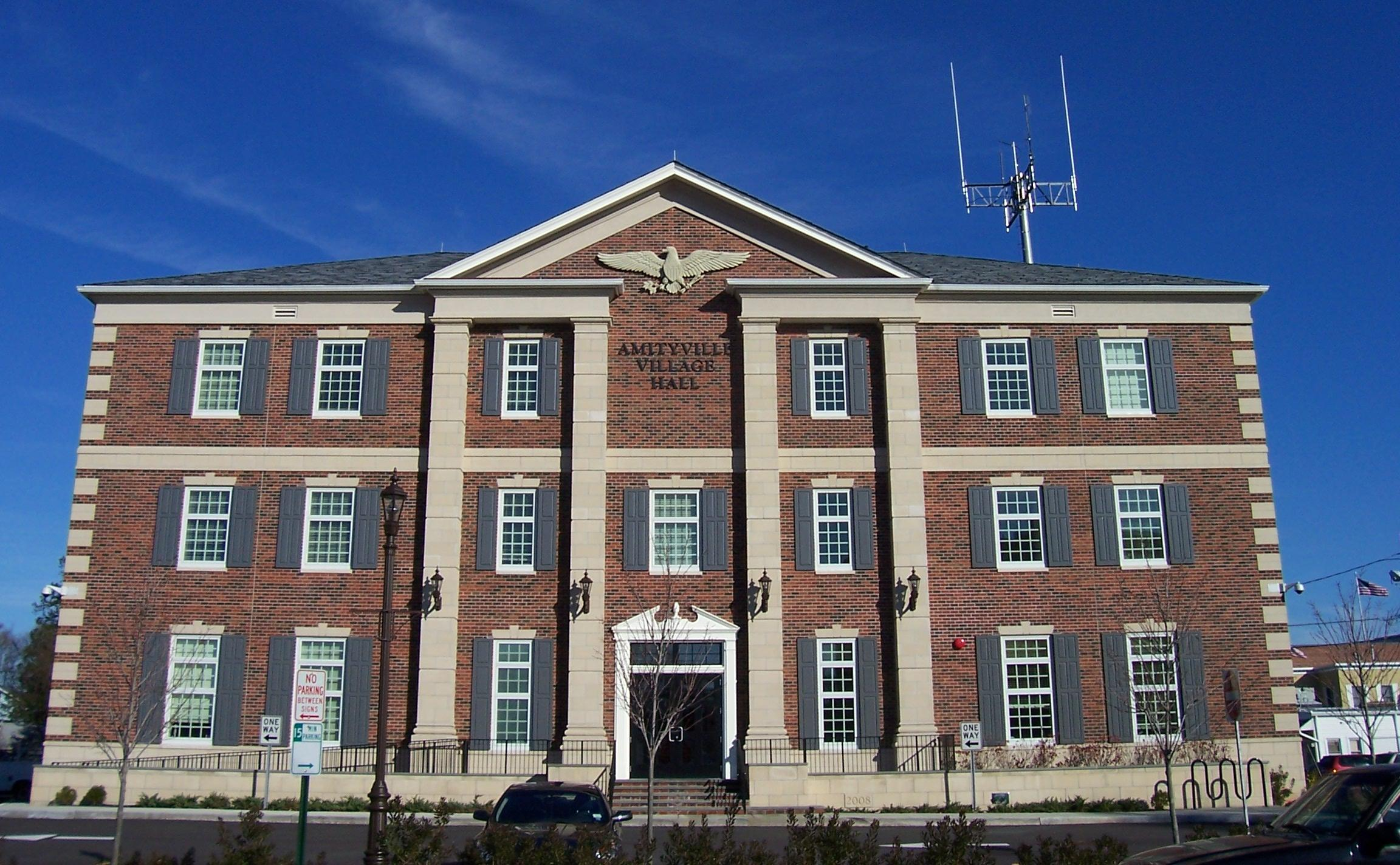
- Amityville Village Hall in December 2009

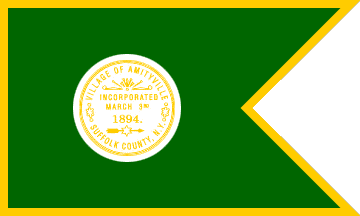
- Flag Official seal and wordmark

- Location within Suffolk County and the state of New York

- Location on Long Island Location within the state of New York
- Coordinates: 40°40′18″N 73°24′54″W
- Country: United States
- State: New York
- County: Suffolk
- Town: Babylon
- Incorporated: March 3, 1894

Government
  - Mayor: Michael W. O'Neill

Area
  - Total: 2.47 sq mi (6.41 km^{2})
  - Land: 2.05 sq mi (5.32 km^{2})
  - Water: 0.42 sq mi (1.08 km^{2})
- Elevation: 20 ft (6 m)

Population (2020)
  - Total: 9,500
  - Density: 4,621.4/sq mi (1,784.35/km^{2})
- Time zone: UTC-5 (Eastern (EST))
  - Summer (DST): UTC-4 (EDT)
- ZIP Codes: 11701, 11708
- Area codes: 631, 934
- FIPS code: 36-02044
- GNIS feature ID: 0942440
- Website: amityville.com

Amityville is a village mostly in the Town of Babylon in Suffolk County, with a small portion in Town of Oyster Bay on the South Shore of Long Island, in New York, United States. The population was 9,500 at the time of the 2020 census. The village maintains its own accredited law enforcement agency, the Amityville Police Department.

== History ==
Huntington settlers first visited the Amityville area in 1653 due to its location to a source of salt hay for use as animal fodder. Chief Wyandanch granted the first deed to land in Amityville in 1658. The area was originally called Huntington West Neck South (it is on the Great South Bay and Suffolk County, New York border in the southwest corner of what once called Huntington South), but is now the Town of Babylon. According to village lore, the name was changed in 1846 when residents were working to establish its new post office. The meeting turned into bedlam and one participant was to exclaim, "What this meeting needs is some amity." Another version says the name was first suggested by mill owner Samuel Ireland to name the town for his boat, the Amity.

The place name is strictly speaking an incidental name, marking an amicable agreement on the choice of a place name. The village was formally incorporated on March 3, 1894. In the early 1900s, Amityville was a popular tourist destination with large hotels on the bay and large homes. Annie Oakley was said to be a frequent guest of vaudevillian Fred Stone. Will Rogers had a home across Clocks Boulevard from Stone. World-famous classical composer and pianist Benjamin Britten resided in the village during World War II. Gangster Al Capone also had a house in the community. Congregants began holding meeting for St. Mary's Church in 1886, building a Chapel in 1888 by Wesley Ketcham under Rev. James H Noble and the church was consecrated in 1889, pre-dating the town incorporation.

=== The Amityville Horror ===
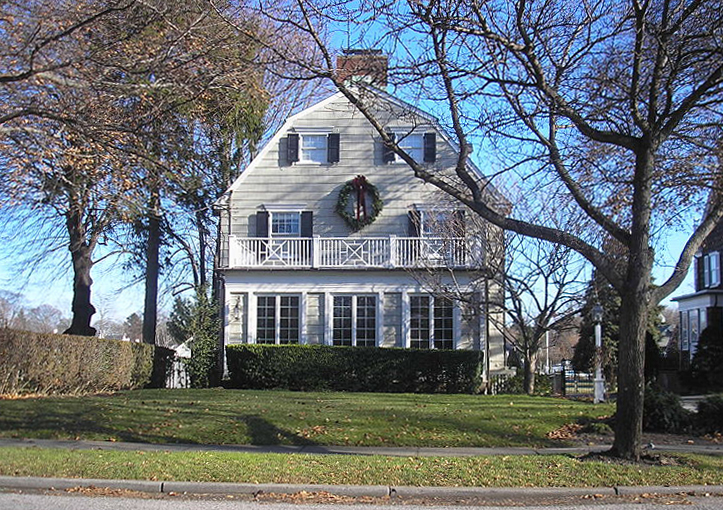
The Amityville Horror House in 2005. The house's signature quarter moon windows on the top floor were replaced in 1990.

Amityville is the setting of the book The Amityville Horror by Jay Anson, which was published in 1977 and has been adapted into a series of films starting in 1979. The story of The Amityville Horror can be traced back to a real-life murder case in Amityville in November 1974, when Ronald DeFeo Jr. shot all six members of his family at 112 Ocean Avenue. In December 1975, George and Kathy Lutz and Kathy's three children moved into the house, but left after twenty-eight days, claiming to have been terrorized by paranormal phenomena produced by the house. Jay Anson's novel is said to be based on these events but has been the subject of much controversy; the murder case actually happened, but there has been no evidence that the house is or was haunted.

The local residents and authorities in Amityville are unhappy with the attention that The Amityville Horror brings to the town, and tend to decline requests to discuss it publicly. The website of the Amityville Historical Society makes no mention of the murders in 1974 or the period that the Lutz family lived at the house. When the History Channel made its documentary about The Amityville Horror in 2000, no member of the Historical Society would discuss the matter on camera.

The house featured in the novel still exists but has been renovated and the address changed in order to discourage tourists from visiting it. The Dutch Colonial Revival architecture house built in 1927 was put on the market in May 2010 for $1.15 million and sold in September for $950,000 (equivalent to $1.4 million in 2025).

== Geography ==
According to the United States Census Bureau, the village has a total area of 2.5 square miles (6.5 km^{2}), of which 2.1 square miles (5.4 km^{2}) is land and 0.4 square miles (1.0 km^{2}) is water, comprising a total of 15.38% water.

The Village of Amityville is bordered to the west by East Massapequa (in Nassau County), to the north by North Amityville, to the east and the south by Copiague, and to the south by the Great South Bay.

== Demographics ==
Historical population
Census	Pop.	Note	%±
1860	204		—
1870	500		145.1%
1880	1,063		112.6%
1890	2,293		115.7%
1900	2,038		−11.1%
1910	2,517		23.5%
1920	3,265		29.7%
1930	4,437		35.9%
1940	5,058		14.0%
1950	6,164		21.9%
1960	8,318		34.9%
1970	9,794		17.7%
1980	9,076		−7.3%
1990	9,286		2.3%
2000	9,441		1.7%
2010	9,523		0.9%
2020	9,500		−0.2%
U.S. Decennial Census

=== 2020 census ===
As of the 2020 census, Amityville had a population of 9,500. The median age was 49.5 years. 14.7% of residents were under the age of 18 and 24.5% of residents were 65 years of age or older. For every 100 females there were 91.6 males, and for every 100 females age 18 and over there were 88.5 males age 18 and over.

100.0% of residents lived in urban areas, while 0.0% lived in rural areas.

There were 3,846 households in Amityville, of which 21.7% had children under the age of 18 living in them. Of all households, 43.7% were married-couple households, 18.1% were households with a male householder and no spouse or partner present, and 31.1% were households with a female householder and no spouse or partner present. About 30.9% of all households were made up of individuals and 16.4% had someone living alone who was 65 years of age or older.

There were 4,015 housing units, of which 4.2% were vacant. The homeowner vacancy rate was 0.7% and the rental vacancy rate was 2.8%.

Racial composition as of the 2020 census
Race	Number	Percent
White	6,644	69.9%
Black or African American	901	9.5%
American Indian and Alaska Native	41	0.4%
Asian	167	1.8%
Native Hawaiian and Other Pacific Islander	0	0.0%
Some other race	969	10.2%
Two or more races	778	8.2%
Hispanic or Latino (of any race)	1,761	18.5%

=== Demographic estimates ===
28.2% of housing units were in multi-unit structures. The homeownership rate was 71.8%. The median value of owner-occupied housing units was $443,500, and 20.7% of occupied housing units were occupied by renters.

38.1% of households were non-families. The average household size was 2.43 and the average family size was 3.02.

78.7% of the population had lived in the same house 1 year and over. 14.9% of the entire population were foreign-born and 21.6% of residents at least 5 years old spoke a language other than English at home.

90.1% of residents at least 25 years old had graduated from high school, and 30.7% of residents at least 25 years old had a bachelor's degree or higher. The mean travel time to work for workers aged 16 and over was 27.8 minutes.

=== Income and poverty ===
The median income for a household in the village was $74,366. The per capita income for the village was $35,411. 6.5% of the population were below the poverty line.

== Education ==
All of the village is served by the Amityville Union Free School District, which also serves large portions of North Amityville and East Massapequa and a small portion of Copiague.

== Points of interest ==
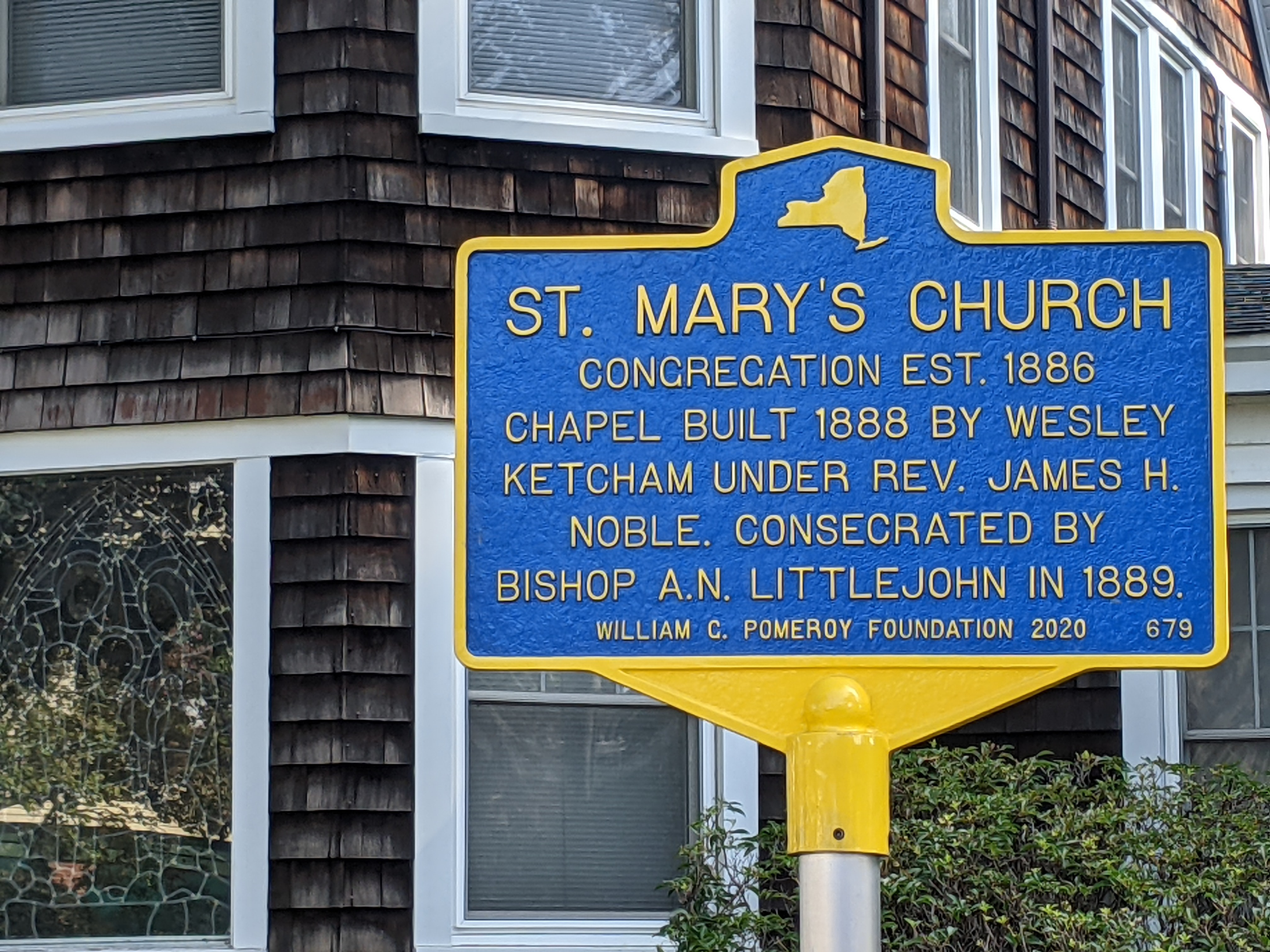
St. Mary's Church historic marker

- The Triangle – The fork of Broadway and Park Avenue, along with Ireland Place create a triangular plot of land at the center of the village. The Triangle building was built in 1892, the same year that Ireland Place opened. A gazebo was added to the north point of The Triangle prior to 1987. In 1994, The Triangle was officially designated "Memorial Triangle" in memory of all who have served the village.
- The Lauder Museum is located at the corner of Broadway and Ireland Place, just south of The Triangle. The historic building was built for the Bank of Amityville in 1909. The Amityville Historical Society opened the Lauder Museum in 1972.
- The Mike James Courts at Bolden Mack Park – not located in the village of Amityville, the Courts are located in the Hamlet of North Amityville which is an unincorporated section of the Town of Babylon. The hamlet is north of, and immediately adjacent to, the village of Amityville.
- The Amityville Beach
- Sand Island – an island in the Great South Bay directly south of the Amityville beach and only accessible by boat.
- 112 Ocean Avenue, the house described in The Amityville Horror
- The Frank W. Smith House was listed on the National Register of Historic Places in 2010.

== Transportation ==
Amityville is served by the Amityville station on Babylon Branch of the Long Island Rail Road. The station is a hub for both Nassau Inter-County Express and Suffolk County Transit buses in the area:

Suffolk County Transit

- 1: Amityville LIRR to Halesite Fire Department
- 2: Amityville LIRR to Patchogue LIRR
- 4: Amityville LIRR to Smith Haven Mall
- 10: Amityville LIRR to Babylon LIRR

Nassau Inter-County Express

- n54: Amityville LIRR to Hempstead Transit Center
- n55: Amityville LIRR to Hempstead Transit Center
- n71: Amityville LIRR to Farmingdale State College

== Notable people ==
- Henry Austin – 19th-century baseball player, died in Amityville
- Alec Baldwin – actor
- Christine Belford – actress
- Rob Carpenter – wide receiver
- Prince Paul – producer
- De La Soul – hip-hop trio
- Benjamin Britten – British classical composer. He lived intermittently in Amityville from 1939 to 1942, and he resided at the home of Dr. William Mayer and his wife Elizabeth Mayer.
- Rik Fox – bass guitarist
- Hope Gangloff - artist
- Tony Graffanino – MLB player
- Mike Gribbon – retired soccer player
- Mike James – NBA player
- Kevin Kregel – astronaut
- Ronald DeFeo Jr. – mass murderer
- Ja'net Dubois – actress from the TV show Good Times
- Kene Holliday – actor from the TV show Matlock
- Nick LaLota – U.S. congressman
- Tre Mason – NFL running back for Los Angeles Rams
- Donnie McClurkin – gospel singer
- Bill McDermott – CEO of ServiceNow and former CEO of SAP.
- John Niland – NFL player
- Peter Pears – tenor vocalist and Benjamin Britten's romantic partner; both he and Britten resided intermittently at the home of William Meyers and his wife during World War II.
- Robert Phillips – classical guitarist
- A. J. Price – NBA player
- George Ross – baseball player
- David Torn – composer, guitarist, and music producer
- Ken Webb – disc jockey
- Dave Weldon – U.S. congressman
- Darrel Young – NFL player

== Sister city ==
Amityville has been a sister city with Le Bourget, France since 1979.

== See also ==
- List of villages in New York
