= Frank W. Smith House =

- U.S. National Register of Historic Places
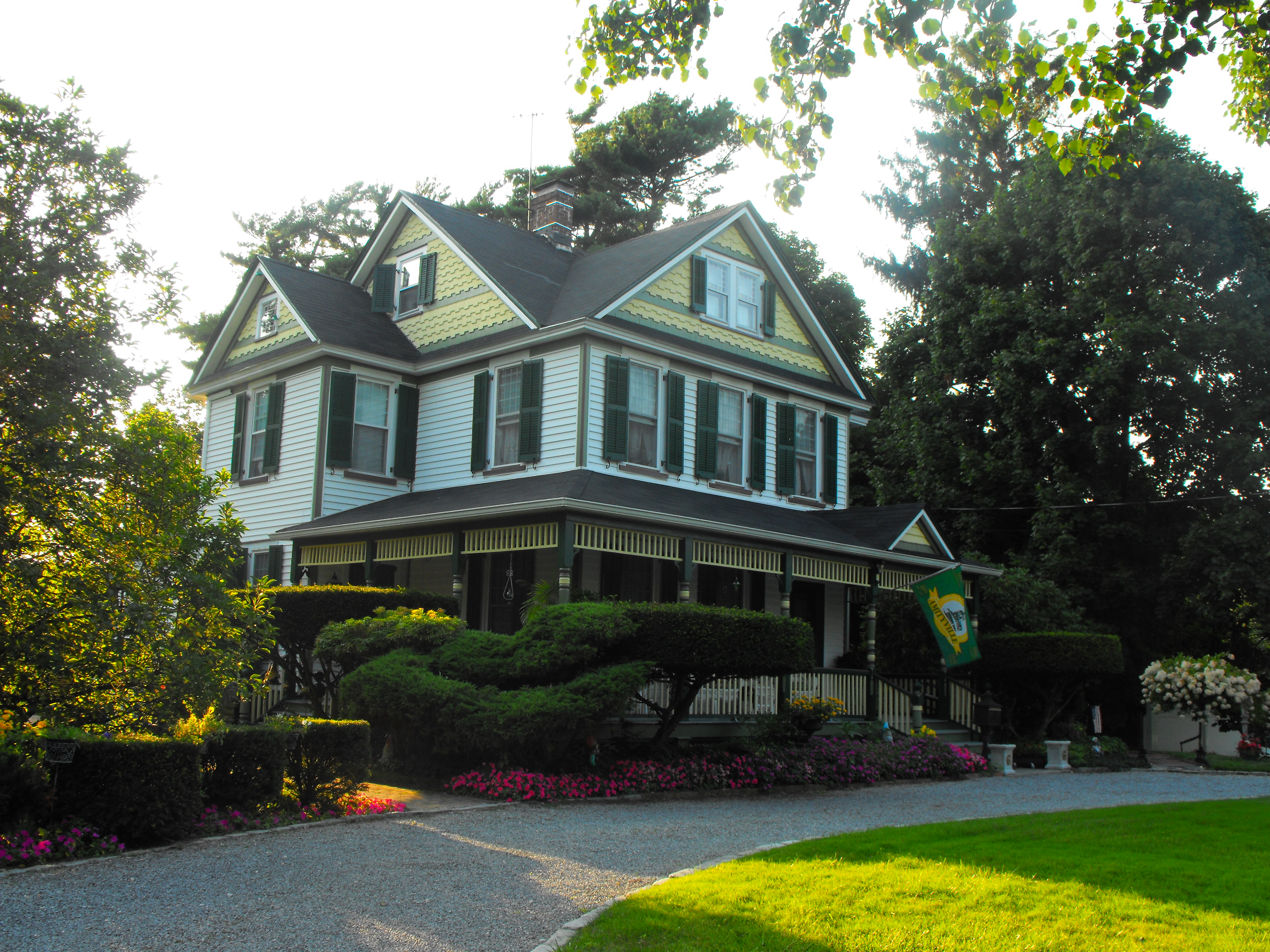
- Frank W. Smith House, August 2008

- Location within New York Location within the United States
- Location: 43 Barberry Ct, Amityville, New York
- Coordinates: 40°40′27″N 73°24′42″W
- Area: less than one acre
- Built: ca. 1901
- Architectural style: Queen Anne
- NRHP reference No.: 10000797
- Added to NRHP: September 24, 2010

The Frank W. Smith House is a historic home located within the Incorporated Village of Amityville, in Suffolk County, on Long Island, in New York, United States.

== Description ==
The house was built about 1901, and is a 2 1/2-story, Queen Anne style frame dwelling. It features a one-story wrap-around porch.

It was listed on the National Register of Historic Places in 2010.
