= Cristina de Middel =

Spanish photographer (born 1975)

- Born: 1975 (age 50–51); Alicante, Spain
- Education: University of Oklahoma; Technical University of Valencia; Autonomous University of Barcelona
- Known for: Photography
- Notable work: The Afronauts
- Awards: Publication – International Center of Photography Infinity Award; 2013 The Afronauts
- Website: www.lademiddel.com

Cristina de Middel (born 1975) is a Spanish-Belgian documentary photographer and artist living and working in Uruapan, Mexico. She is a full member of Magnum Photos and her work is held in the Tate collection.

== Early life and education ==
De Middel was born in Alicante, Spain. She is half-Belgian, half-Spanish.

She graduated with a M.A. in Photography from the University of Oklahoma, Oklahoma, USA in 2000; with a M.A. in Fine Arts from the Technical University of Valencia, Valencia, Spain in 2001; and with a Postgraduate Degree in Photojournalism from the Autonomous University of Barcelona, Barcelona, Spain in 2002.

== Life and work ==
De Middel spent ten years working as a photojournalist at a Spanish newspaper. She left in 2012 to pursue personal projects.

She self-published The Afronauts in 2012, a photobook about the short-lived Zambian space program in Southern Africa. The book explored the history of the failed 1960s space program through staged re-enactments, challenging "viewers' perceptions about what's real and what's not." She was nominated for the 2013 Deutsche Börse Photography Prize for The Afronauts.

In 2017 she became a nominee member of Magnum Photos and in 2022 became a full member. In June 2022, she became the first Spaniard to be elected president of Magnum. That year, she participated in the Fall 2022 pre-collection by Alexander McQueen, an initiative involving 12 female artists from around the world, including Marcela Correa and Hope Gangloff.

In Journey to the Center (2024), De Middel documented the caravans of migrants who travelled through Mexico from its southern border with Guatemala to Felicity, a small town in California.

== Publications ==
=== Publications by De Middel ===
- The Afronauts. London: Self-published, 2012. ISBN 9788461585960. Edition of 1000 copies.
  - Second edition. Bilbao, Spain: This Book Is True, 2016. Edition of 1500 copies.
- Vida Y Milagros de Paula P (Life and Miracles of Paula P). Alicante, Spain: Museo de la Universidad de Alicante, 2009. Edition of 500 copies. Spanish. Early work featuring the "real story of a fake prostitute" Paula P.
- SPBH Book Club Vol III. London: Self Publish, Be Happy, 2013. Edition of 500 copies. ASIN B00D18UQ0C.
- Party: Quotations from Chairman Mao Tse-tung. Madrid: RM; London: Archive of Modern Conflict, 2013. ISBN 9788415118671. Edition of 1500 copies.
- Afronauts. Zine Collection 12. Paris: Edition Bessard, 2014. ISBN 979-10-91406-02-4. Edition of 300 copies.
- This is What Hatred Did. Mexico; Barcelona: RM Editorial / London: Archive of Modern Conflict, 2015. ISBN 9780992941383. With text by Amos Tutuola, "My Life in the Bush of Ghosts".
- Sharkification. São Paulo, Brazil: Editora Madalena, 2015. ISBN 9788569557074. Edition of 100 copies.
- Man Jayen. Pamplona, Spain: Trama, 2015. ISBN 978-84-8081-473-7. Catalogue of an exhibition held at the Museum of the University of Navarra. Edition of 1000 copies.
- Cucurrucucu. Bilbao, Spain: This Book Is True; self-published, 2016. ISBN 978-84-16282-65-4. With a text by Cuauhtémoc Medina.
- The Perfect Man. Madrid, Spain: Editorial La Fabrica, 2017. ISBN 9788417048396.
- Jungle Check Barcelona, Spain: Editorial RM, 2018. ISBN 978-84-17047-71-9.
- Midnight at the Crossroads Bilbao, Spain: This Book is True; self-published, 2018.
- Preparados, Listos, Archivo. Madrid, Spain: Spanish Ministry of Culture, 2018. ISBN 978-84-8181-724-9
- Gentlemen's Club Bilbao, Spain: This Book is True; self-published, 2023. ISBN 9788448268459
- The Kabuler Bilbao, Spain: This Book is True; self-published, 2023.
- Journey to the Center. RM, 2024. ISBN 9788410290006.

=== Publications about de Middel ===
- Cristina de Middel. Colleción PHotoBolsillo. Madrid: La Fábrica, 2015. ISBN 978-8416248230.

== Awards ==
- 2013: Nominated, Deutsche Börse Photography Prize for The Afronauts
- 2013: Infinity Award from the International Center of Photography
- 2014: Party: Quotations from Chairman Mao Tse-tung won PhotoEspaña's Best Photography Book, international category award
- 2020: Prix Virginia, award for female photographers, for Journey to the Center

== Exhibitions ==
- Close Enough: New Perspectives from 12 Women Photographers of Magnum, International Center of Photography, New York, 2022

== Collections ==
De Middel's work is held in the following permanent collection:

- Tate, UK: 46 prints
