= Happy Fun Ball =

Parody advertisement

One of Happy Fun Ball's numerous warnings

"Happy Fun Ball" is a parody advertisement that first aired on February 16, 1991, on Saturday Night Live. Described as a "classic that can sit right up there with Dan Aykroyd's Bass-o-Matic", the topic of the sketch is a toy rubber ball, the advertisement for which is accompanied by a long series of bizarre disclaimers and increasingly ominous warnings, including "Do not taunt Happy Fun Ball". It was brought back for several "Best of Saturday Night Live" specials.

== Concept ==
Written by Jack Handey and voiced by Phil Hartman, the ad featured three "kids" portrayed by Dana Carvey, Jan Hooks, and Mike Myers. The brief commercial declares Happy Fun Ball (produced by Wacky Products Incorporated, and its parent company, Global Chemical Unlimited), just $14.95, was "the toy sensation sweeping the nation!" However, this positive message about the innocuous-seeming toy was undercut by a lengthier number of bizarre disclaimers and warnings, including "may suddenly accelerate to dangerous speeds" and "If Happy Fun Ball begins to smoke, seek shelter and cover head." Ingredients include "an unknown glowing substance which fell to Earth, presumably from outer space"; said ingredients are not to be "touched, inhaled, or looked at" if exposed due to rupture. Viewers were also warned, "Do not taunt Happy Fun Ball." The sketch ends with a slogan for Happy Fun Ball: "Accept no substitutes!"

The parody lampooned advertisers, pharmaceutical companies, toy manufacturers, chemical companies, absurdly long legal disclaimers, alien conspiracies, and mentions the 1991 Gulf War (stating Happy Fun Ball was dropped by U.S. warplanes on Iraq).

Happy Fun Ball was presented as one of the sponsors of the first "Unfrozen Caveman Lawyer" sketch (aired November 23, 1991), with the claim Happy Fun Ball was "Still legal in 16 states. It's happy. It's fun. It's Happy Fun Ball."

== See also ==
- Recurring Saturday Night Live characters and sketches
- SuperHappyDevHouse
- Super Ball
