= Smiljan Radić Clarke =

Chilean architect (born 1965)

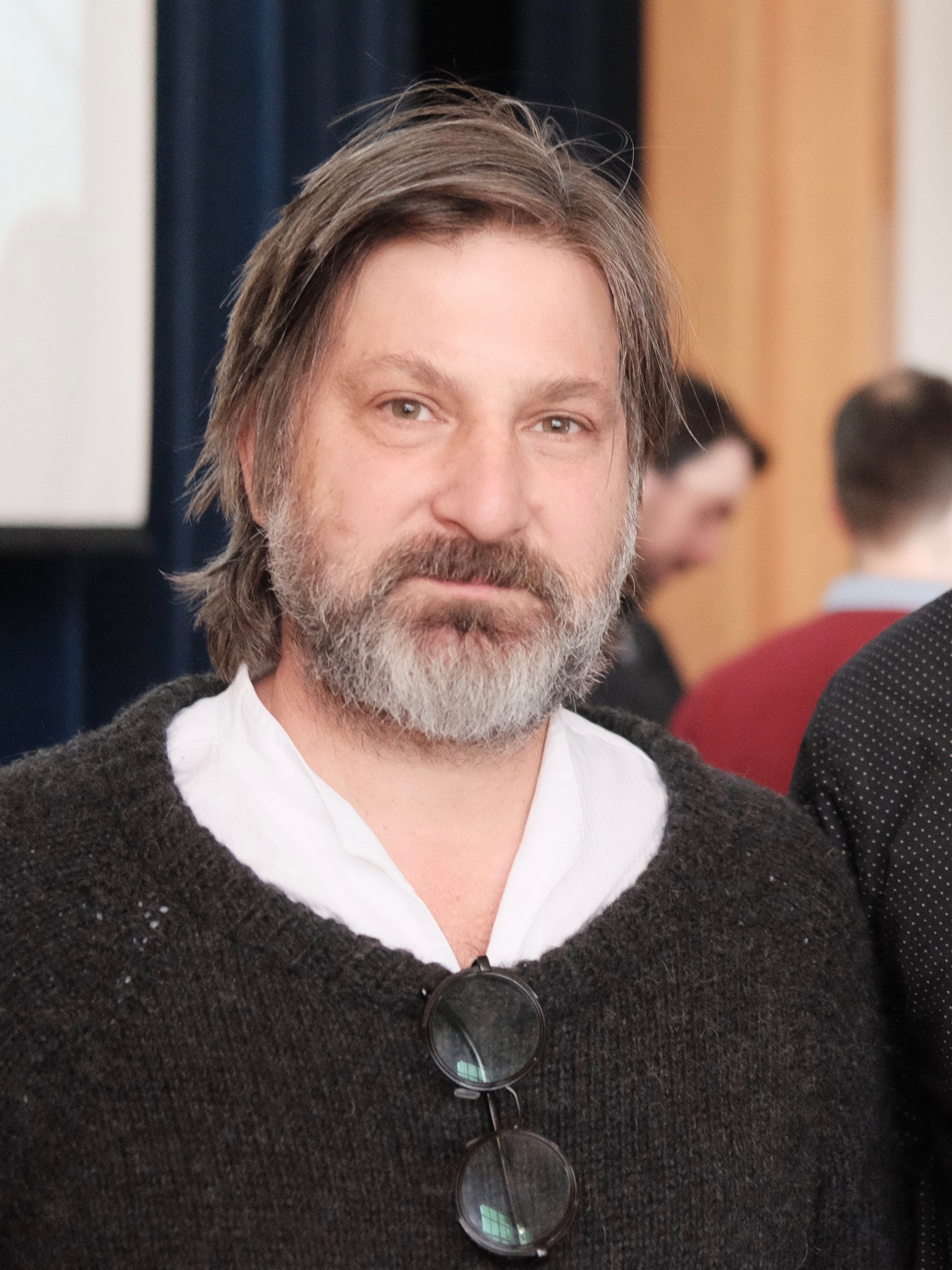
- Radić in 2019
- Born: 21 June 1965 (age 61); Santiago, Chile
- Education: Pontifical Catholic University of Chile St. Ignatius El Bosque
- Occupation: Architect
- Years active: 1989–present
- Notable work: Serpentine Gallery Pavilion (2014); VIK Winery

Smiljan Radić Clarke (Note: In this Chilean name, the first or paternal surname is Radić and the second or maternal family name is Clarke.) (born 21 June 1965) is a Chilean architect. His work includes residential buildings, cultural institutions, and temporary installations. He won the Pritzker Architecture Prize in 2026.

== Early life and education ==
Radić was born on 21 June 1965 in Santiago to Smiljan Radic Piraíno and Cora Clarke Ramírez. His paternal grandfather emigrated to Chile from the island of Brač, in present-day Croatia, in 1919, and his maternal family has origins in the United Kingdom.

He studied architecture at the Pontifical Catholic University of Chile, graduating in 1989. After completing his degree, he studied history at the Istituto Universitario di Architettura di Venezia in Venice, Italy, and traveled in Europe.

== Career ==
Radić founded his architectural practice in Santiago in 1995. The studio has remained small but has produced numerous projects both in Chile and internationally. During his university studies he met the sculptor Marcela Correa, whom he later married. The two have collaborated on several projects, including Casa Chica (Vilches, Chile, 1997), a small house constructed in the Andes of Central Chile.

Radić's early projects included residential buildings in Chile, such as Copper House 2 (Talca, 2004–2005) and Pite House (Papudo, 2003–2005). His later work includes cultural and public buildings, installations, and temporary structures. For example, he designed the 2014 edition of the annual Serpentine Gallery Pavilion in London. The structure consisted of a translucent fiberglass shell supported by large quarry stones. In 2017 Radić established the Fundación de Arquitectura Frágil in Santiago, which organizes exhibitions and research activities related to experimental architecture. Other completed projects include the Regional Theater of Bío-Bío in Concepción, Chile (2018) and NAVE, a performing arts center in Santiago.

Radić had exhibitions in Tokyo (2010, 2013, 2016), Hiroshima (2012), Zagreb (2015), New York (MoMA 2015 – 2016, 2018).

In March 2026, he received the Pritzker Architecture Prize. Since 2009, he has been an honorary member of the American Institute of Architects, and since 2020 a corresponding member of the Croatian Academy of Sciences and Arts.

In 2026, he was awarded the National Architecture Award of Chile alongside Alejandro Aravena "in tribute to a body of work of excellence, widely recognized for its quality, influence, and contribution to the development of the discipline, constituting a legacy of exceptional value for national architecture."

== Architectural approach ==
Radić's work frequently combines materials such as concrete, stone, timber, glass, and fiberglass. His projects often emphasize relationships between buildings and their surrounding landscapes and environmental conditions.

His designs have been associated with experimentation in construction methods, material expression, and small-scale architectural interventions.

== Personal life ==
Radic has a long-standing relationship with sculptor Marcela Correa. The two met during their university years and eventually married, establishing a partnership characterized by an ongoing exchange of ideas between sculpture and architecture.

== Selected works ==
- Casa Chica, Vilches, Chile (1997)
- Copper House 2, Talca, Chile (2004–2005)
- Pite House, Papudo, Chile (2003–2005)
- Mestizo Restaurant, Santiago, Chile (2005–2007)
- House for the Poem of the Right Angle, Vilches, Chile (2010–2012)
- Bus Stop Krumbach, Austria (2014)
- Serpentine Gallery Pavilion, London (2014)
- VIK Winery, Millahue, Chile (2014)
- Teatro Regional del Biobío, Concepción, Chile (2018)
- Pavilion for the Chile Architecture Biennial (2023)
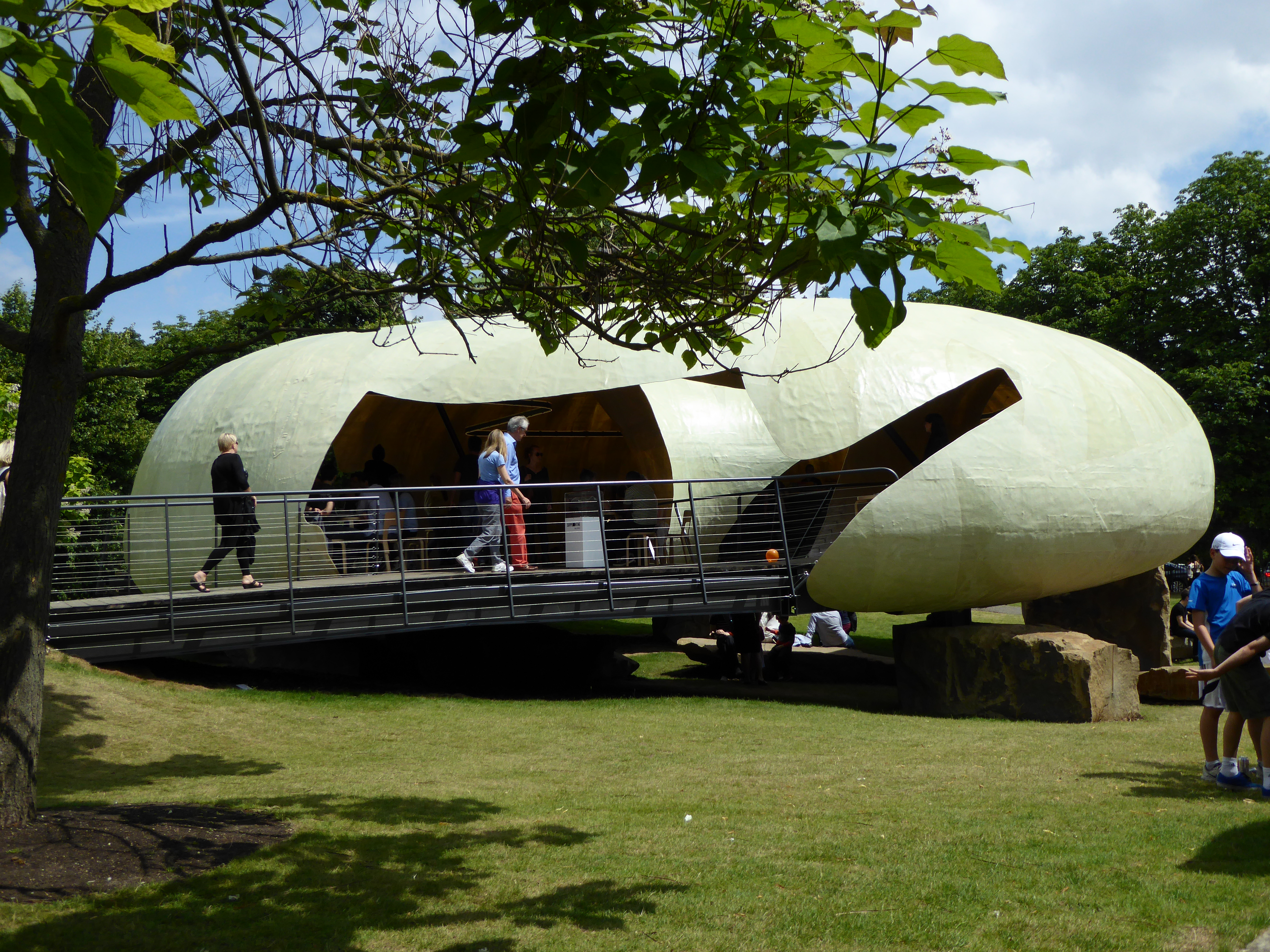
Serpentine Gallery Pavilion

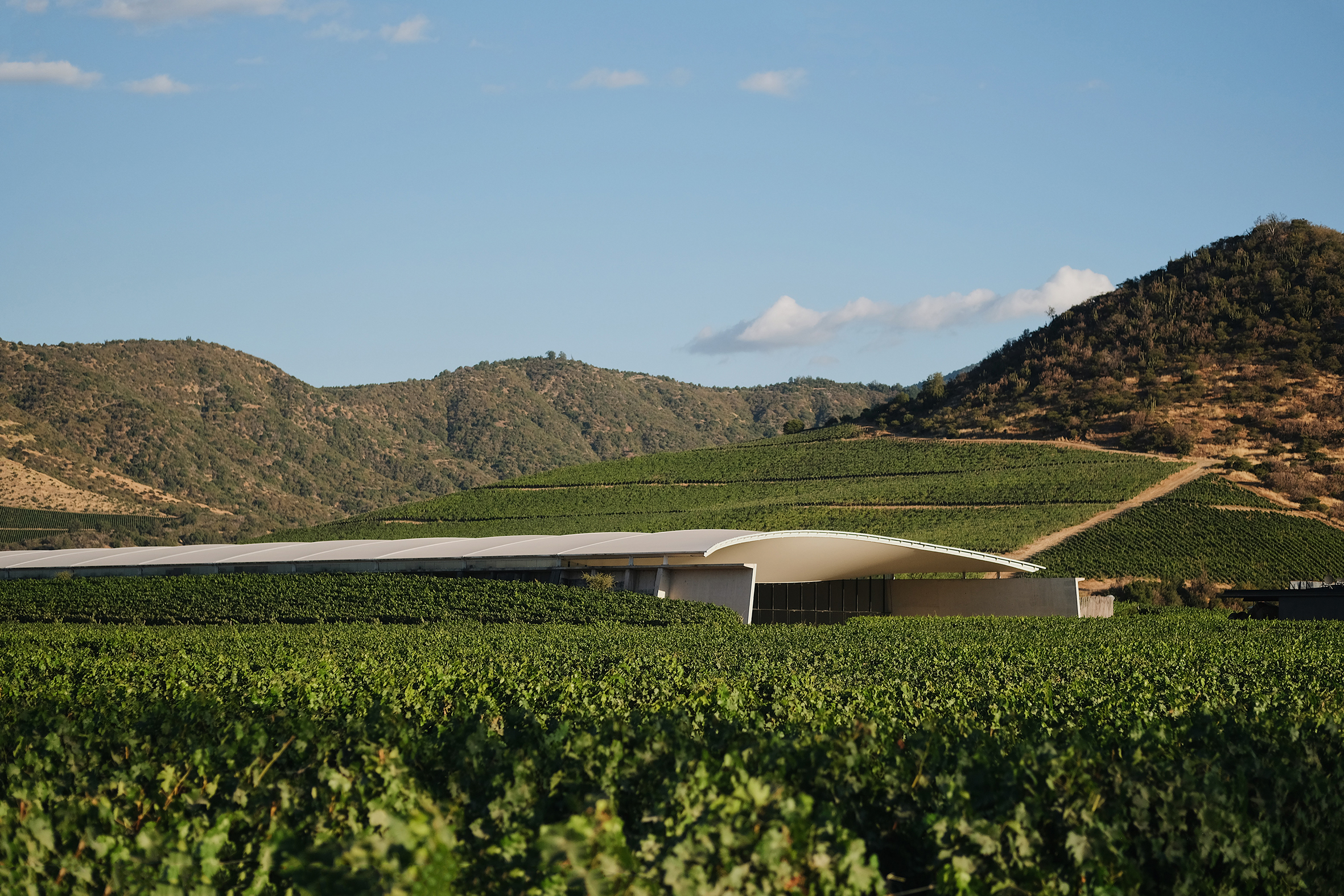
VIK Winery

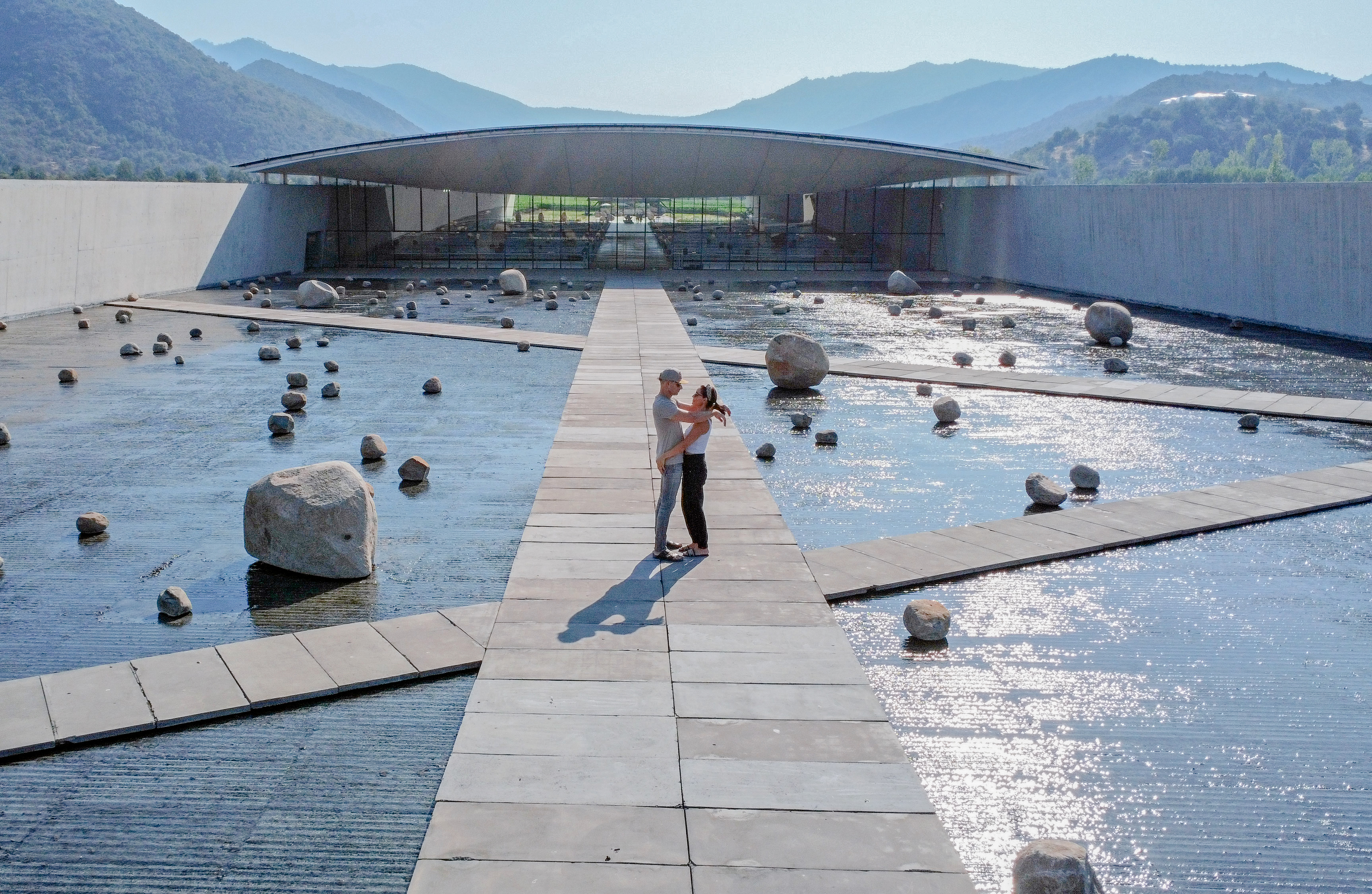
VIK Winery, reflective pool

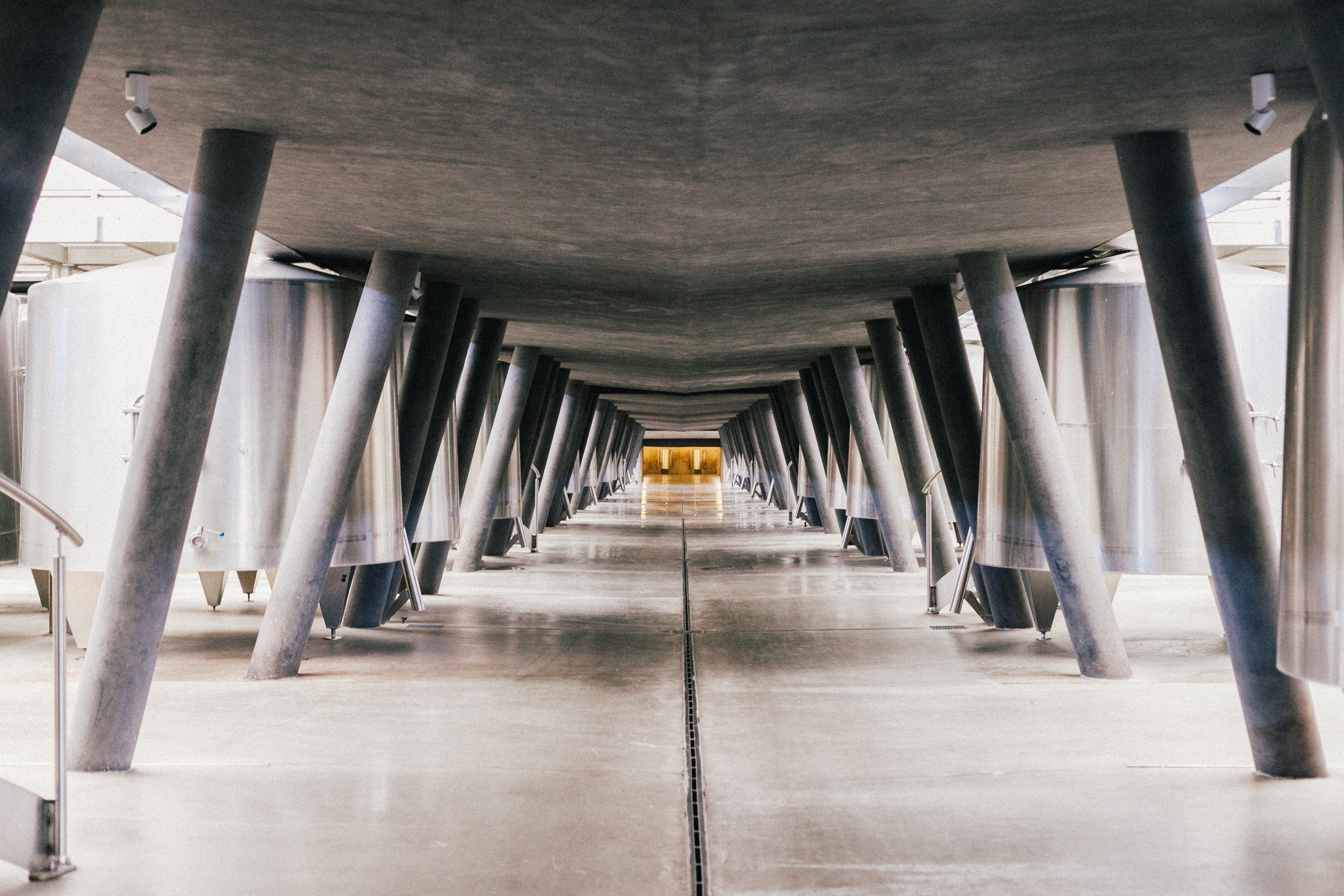
VIK Winery, interior

== Awards and accolades ==
- Best Architect Under 35, Colegio de Arquitectos de Chile (2001)
- Architectural Record Design Vanguard Award (2008)
- Oris Award (2015)
- Arnold W. Brunner Memorial Prize, American Academy of Arts and Letters (2018)
- Grand Prize, Pan-American Architecture Biennial of Quito (2022)
- Pritzker Architecture Prize (2026)
