= Mike Gribbon =

American soccer player

Personal information
- Full name: Michael Gribbon
- Date of birth: November 30, 1957 (age 68)
- Place of birth: Amityville, New York, U.S.
- Position: Defender

Youth career
- 1975–1979: Clemson Tigers

Senior career*
Years	Team	Apps	(Gls)
1980	New England Tea Men	31	(1)
1981	Jacksonville Tea Men	2	(0)
- * Club domestic league appearances and goals

Mike Gribbon is an American retired soccer defender who spent two seasons in the North American Soccer League.

Gribbon attended Clemson University, playing on the men's soccer team from 1975 to 1979. In 1979, the Tigers finished runner-up in the NCAA Men's Division I Soccer Championship. In 1980, the New England Tea Men selected Gribbon in the first round (second overall) of the American Soccer League draft. He scored his only goal with the team in his first game and quickly became a regular on the back line. In 1981, the team moved to Jacksonville, Florida and became the Jacksonville Tea Men. Gribbon played two games for the relocated Tea Men.
