= Alexander Lloyd (venture capitalist) =

- Education: University of Pennsylvania; The Wharton School
- Occupation: Managing partner at Accelerator Ventures

Alexander "Alex" Lloyd is a venture capitalist, and the founder and managing partner of Accelerator Ventures, an investment and venture fund. Lloyd was an early investor in many companies that have gone public or merged, including online shoe company Zappos which was acquired by Amazon.com in 2009 in an all-stock deal worth about $1.2 billion and semantic job search engine Trovix which was acquired by Monster.com in 2008 for $72.5 million.

Other companies Lloyd has invested in are technology platform iSocket, software and video game developer Tapulous, the mobile marketing automation company Appboy (now Braze, Inc.) and Microsoft owned Powerset. Lloyd is a board of directors' observer for LoopNet, MerchantCircle, MobilePlay, and Practice Technologies Inc. He is a mentor for Los Angeles-based business incubator MuckerLab, and has co-written an article for The Atlantic.

Prior to founding Accelerator Ventures, Lloyd was a venture partner at Rustic Canyon Partners. He has also worked at Microsoft, SGI, Activision, Apple Computer and Goldman Sachs. He holds a BA from The University of Pennsylvania and an MBA from The Wharton School.

== Philanthropy ==
Lloyd is active in philanthropy, and founded the San Francisco Media Arts Council. He served as commissioner for the San Francisco Art Commission, and sits on the board of Slideluck. He has been on the board of SF Camerawork and the Contemporary Extension of the San Francisco Museum of Modern Art.
