= Alexander Vik =

Norwegian businessman

Alexander Vik is a Norwegian billionaire businessman, known for his legal dispute with Deutsche Bank, including a conviction for contempt of court. He graduated from Harvard College, where he was a member of the golf team.

Vik has been married his wife Carrie in 1982 and has 4 children.
