= Isocket =

iSocket
- Industry: Digital advertising
- Founded: 2008; 18 years ago
- Headquarters: San Francisco, United States
- Parent: Rubicon Project

iSocket is a technology platform aiming to simplify guaranteed media sales. iSocket has two products: iSocket for Publishers (iFP) and iSocket for Advertisers (iFA).

== Overview ==
iFP is a suite of sales automation and programmatic direct tools that help publisher sales teams streamline the direct sales process. iFA is an automated buying tool that makes it easier for agencies, and brands to buy well-defined, guaranteed inventory directly from publishers in the iSocket catalog. Through automation, iSocket tries to eliminate errors and overhead costs related to the manual media sales process.

== History ==
iSocket was founded in 2008 and is located in San Francisco, California with additional offices in New York City. In 2011, Google's DoubleClick For Publishers ad server partnered with iSocket to bring direct sales into the DFP platform. In October 2011, after the rise of programmatic real-time bidding for remnant display ad inventory through APIs, iSocket announced the first API platform for premium inventory. This gave advertisers the ability to find and buy direct advertising through an API.

In October 2012, iSocket raised a $8 million in a round led by Foundry Group. In February 2014, iSocket announced an additional $5 million led by Time Warner Investments and Conde Nast.

In November 2014, iSocket was acquired by the publicly traded company Rubicon Project.
