= North Babylon Union Free School District =

Public school district in Suffolk County, New York, United States

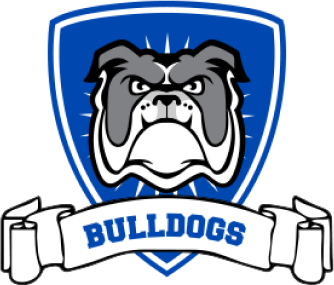
- North Babylon School District Icon

Address
- 1 Phelps Lane North Babylon, New York, 11703; United States
- Coordinates: 40°43′32″N 73°19′24″W

District information
- Grades: PK–12
- Superintendent: Kenneth Graham
- Schools: 7
- Budget: $130,672,000
- NCES District ID: 3620910

Students and staff
- Students: 4,590 (2018–19)
- Teachers: 374.25 (on an FTE basis)
- Student–teacher ratio: 12.26:1
- District mascot: Bulldog
- Colors: Blue, White

Other information
- Website: http://www.northbabylonschools.net/

North Babylon Union Free School District is a public school district in the Town Of Babylon serving the community of North Babylon along with parts of West Babylon and even a tiny sliver of Deer Park in Suffolk County, on Long Island, New York, United States. The superintendent is Kenneth Graham .

== Administration ==
The District offices are located 5 Jardine Place. The current Superintendent is Dr. Kenneth E. Graham.

=== Administrators ===
- Kim Skillen, Deputy Superintendent for Instruction
- Frank Bacchi, Assistant Superintendent for Business
- Barbara Butler, Assistant Superintendent for Personnel & Educational Operations
- Monica Manzi, Assistant Superintendent for PPS & Special Education

=== Board of Education ===
- Matthew Lucchetti, President
- Heather Rowland, Vice President
- Krystle Barnett, Trustee
- Jeffrey Myers, Trustee
- Keisha Rivers, Trustee
- Bob Scheid, Trustee
- Kathleen Tedesco, Trustee

=== Selected Former Superintendents ===
Previous assignment and reason for departure denoted in parentheses

- Mr. Gene Grasso
- Dr. John Micciche – Retired 2005
- Dr. Randall D. Bos – 2005-2006 (Superintendent - Waterloo Central School District, suspended by North Babylon Board of Education for undisclosed reasons and retired)
- Dr. Joseph Laria – 2006-2007
- Dr. Robert Aloise
- Mrs. Patricia Godek – 2011-2014
- Mr. Glen Eschbach – 2015-2022
- Dr. Laurence Aronstein; 2022-2023 (Interim - Replaced by Ken Graham February 2023)

== Schools ==
=== Secondary schools ===
==== North Babylon High School ====
North Babylon High School is located at 1 Phelps Lane and serves grades 9 through 12. The principal is Jonathan Klomp.

==== Robert Moses Middle School ====
Robert Moses Middle School is located at 250 Phelps Lane and serves grades 6 through 8. The principal is Stephanie Hasandras.

=== Elementary schools ===
==== Belmont Elementary School ====
Belmont Elementary School is located at 108 Barnum Street and serves grades K through 5. The principal is Valerie Jackson.

==== Marion G. Vedder Elementary School ====
Marion G. Vedder Elementary School (formerly known as Deer Park Avenue ("DPA") Elementary School) is located at 794 Deer Park Avenue and serves grades P through 5. The principal is Kerry Larke.

==== Parliament Place Elementary School ====
Parliament Place Elementary School is located at 80 Parliament Place and serves grades K through 5. The principal is Drew Olson.

==== William E. DeLuca Jr. Elementary School ====
William E. Deluca Jr. Elementary School (Formally known as Parkside Elementary School) is located at 223 Phelps Lane and serves grades K through 5. The principal is Vincent Fantauzzi.

==== Woods Road Elementary School ====
Woods Road Elementary School is located at 110 Woods Road and serves grades K through 5. The principal is Celeste Archer.

=== Former School Buildings ===
Peter J. Brennan Junior High School - closed in the late 1980s, students in grades 7-8 moved to Robert Moses JHS, and students in grade 9 moved to North Babylon High School. After closing, it served as the Suffolk County Police Academy for several years. Currently, the building is now known as the Brennan Middle School and the Brennan High School for students with emotional and behavioral problems, and is run by Western Suffolk BOCES.

Weeks Road Elementary School - built in 1953 and closed in 1979, the school was demolished in the early 1980s and the land sold to developers. Property is now known as the Primrose Lane Senior Community.

Phelps Lane Elementary School - closed in the 1980s. The building now serves as the Town of Babylon Town Hall Annex.

== See also ==
- Babylon Union Free School District
- West Babylon Union Free School District
