= Séamus Ó Siaghail =

Séamus Ó Siaghail, OFM (fl. 1636?), was an Irish scribe.

Ó Siaghail was a member of the Ó Siadhail bardic family that had lived in Uí Failghe. He was a member of the Franciscan Order, whose patrons included Toirdhealbhach Mac Cochláin, to whom the 1627 English translation of the Annals of Clonmacnoise was dedicated.

At some point before October 1636, Séamus Ó Siaghail and his fellow-Franciscan, Aodh Ó Raghailligh, began the process of transcribing and translating The Rule of St. Clare into the Irish language for the Poor Clares of Bethleham, County Westmeath. However, for reasons unknown, the work remained unfinished, though Mícheál Ó Cléirigh finished the transcription in mid-October 1636. It was some ten years later before the work was finished at Galway, at the behest of Mary Bonaventure Browne, by Dubhaltach Mac Fhirbhisigh. It was completed on 8 December 1647 and is now Royal Irish Academy MS D i 2.

== See also ==
- Eoghan Carrach Ó Siadhail
- Michael Shiell
- Micheal O'Siadhail
- Brooke Shields
