= Dashiell =

Dashiell is both a male given name and a surname.

== People ==
Notable people with the name include:

First name

- Dashiell Eaves (born 1974), American actor
- Dashiell Hammett (1894–1961), American author
- Dashiell Mihok (born 1974), American actor

Middle name

- George Dashiell Bayard (1835–1862), United States Army general
- Robert Laurenson Dashiell Davidson (1909–1998), American philatelist
- Isaac Dashiell Jones (1806–1893), American politician in Maryland

Last name

- Aaron Dashiell (21st century), American football safety
- Doug Dashiell (1905–1975), American football coach
- John Dashiell (1888–1975), American psychologist
- Margaret May Dashiell (1867–1958), American artist and writer
- Paul Dashiell (1867–1937), American football coach, brother of Robert
- Robert B. Dashiell (1860–1899), American naval officer and ordnance expert, brother of Paul
- Russell DaShiell (born 1947), American guitarist
- Wally Dashiell (1902–1972), American baseball shortstop
- William Robert Dashiell (1863–1939), American military officer

== Fictional characters ==
- Dashiell Gibson, main character of the book series Moon Base Alpha by Stuart Gibbs
- Dashiell Robert Parr, character from The Incredibles
- Dashiell "Dash" Arkadin, one of the three “Precogs” from Minority Report (film)
- Dashiell Qwerty, character in Who Could That Be at This Hour? by Lemony Snicket
- Dashiell Montgomery, character in the HBO Max show The Gilded Age

== Other uses ==
- Jeremiah Dashiell House, a historic building in San Antonio, Texas, named for Jeremiah Yellott Dashiell (1804–1888)
- USS Dashiell (DD-659), a Fletcher-class destroyer of the United States Navy named for Robert B. Dashiell (1860–1899)

== See also ==
- Shiell
