= Ó Siadhail =

Ó Siadhail / uaSiadhail / uaSiadgail is a Gaelic-Irish surname.

== Overview ==
There were at least three families of this name in Gaelic Ireland.

- Ó Siadhail of Ui Maine, now east County Galway.
- Ó Siadhail of Uí Failghe, now County Offaly and County Laois.
- Ó Siadhail of Tír Chonaill, now County Donegal.

Little is recorded of the Ui Maine family. Those of Uí Failghe and Tír Chonaill were ollamhs of medicine, hereditary physicians to the ruling families in the respectives kingdoms and environs. It is not clear if the two were branches of the one family, or unrelated families who happened to bear the same surname.

One of the Ó Siadhail branches were physicians in service to the McMahons of Oriel, and later to the O'Neills. In the 1580s, this branch relocated from Brosna, County Kerry to Moycashel, County Westmeath.

== Current forms ==
The surname is now generally anglicised as O'Shiel, Shiel, Sheil, Sheils, Sheals, Sheal, and Sheilds (or Shiels, Shields as well as O’Shields), but the original form, Ó Siadhail, is used by persons who are Gaelic and conscious of their genealogy.

== Notable bearers ==
Notable people named Ó Siadhail or one of its variants include:

- Eoghan Carrach Ó Siadhail, poet, fl. c. 1500–1550
- Owen O'Shiel, Irish physician, 1584–1650
- Séamus Ó Siaghail, Irish scribe, c. 1600–1655
- Michael Shiell, Irish clergyman, c. 1663–1700
- James Shields, American politician, 1806–1879
- Micheal O'Siadhail, Irish poet, born 1947
- Kevin Shields, Irish musician, born 1963
- Brooke Shields, American actress, born 1965
- Jimi Shields, Irish musician, born 1967
- Seán Ó Siadhail, 1950–2006
- Paul Shiels, Professor of Geroscience, born 1961

== See also ==
- Shiel
