= Eithne Strong =

Irish writer

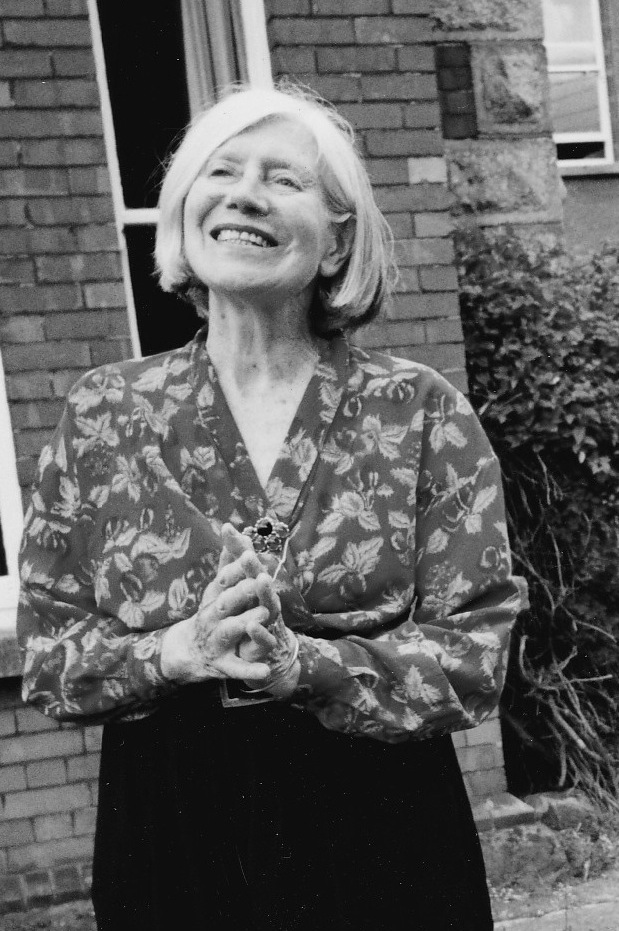
- Born: 1923; Limerick, Ireland
- Died: 1999 (aged 75–76); Monkstown, Dublin
- Occupations: Poet, writer
- Writing career
- Pen name: Eithne Strong

Eithne Strong (née O'Connell; 1923–1999) was a bilingual Irish poet and writer who wrote in both Irish and English. Her first poems in Irish were published in Combhar and An Glor 1943–44 under the name Eithne Ni Chonaill. She was a founder member of the Runa Press, whose early Chapbooks featured artwork by among others Jack B. Yeats, Sean Keating, Sean O'Sullivan, and Harry Kernoff among others. The press was noted for the publication in 1943 of Marrowbone Lane by Robert Collis, which depicts the fierce fighting that took place during the Easter Rising of 1916.

== Life and work ==
Strong was born in Glensharrold, County Limerick to school teachers, John and Kathleen (Lennon) O'Connell. She went to the Irish-speaking school Coláiste Muire, Ennis. Strong moved to Dublin but was unable to afford college at the time. She worked in the Civil Service for a year.

She met her husband while in Dublin. Psychoanalyst Rupert Strong was twelve years her senior and though against the wishes of her family, she stayed there and married him on 12 November 1943. They had nine children the last of whom required full-time care due to a mental handicap.

She attended Trinity College Dublin in her forties where she got a B.A in 1973. She participated in publishing, freelance journalism, teaching, and working with the media. She taught creative writing and represented Irish writing in Europe: Denmark, France, Germany, Finland, England, the US and Canada. Her poetry and short stories have been published widely in magazines, literary pages and anthologies in Ireland and overseas including North America: Canadian Journal of Irish Studies, North Dakota Quarterly, Midland Review, The Thinker Review. In Spring 1994, she read in New York City before the American Conference for Irish Studies and to members of Conradh na Gaeilge in Washington. Her books include five of poetry in Irish.

Author and poet Mary O'Donnell in her foreword-essay to Strong's poems suggested that "diversity of thought and impulse makes these poems radiate humanity, belief and a revelatory sense of justice". The editor of Poethead Wordpress, Christine Elizabeth Murray has linked the poetry of Patrick Kavanagh, Padraic Colum and Eithne Strong, describing their work "as an example of the triumph of art and literature providing an amazing root-system for new writers in terms of earthly estate, land and language".

In 1991 she won the Kilkenny Design Award for Flesh – The Greatest Sin. She was a member of Aosdána. She died in Monkstown, Dublin in 1999.

The Dún Laoghaire Annual Book Festival, 'Mountains to the Sea' awards the Rupert & Eithne Strong Poetry Prize now the Strong/Shine Award made possible by the generous support of Shine, the national organisation dedicated to the needs of those affected by mental ill health. On International Women's Day 2000, an event was held to commemorate the life and work of Eithne Strong at the Irish Writer's Centre, Parnell Square, Dublin and a room was named in her honour in 2012. Her manuscripts are stored uncataloged at the National Library of Ireland.

== Bibliography ==
=== Poetry in Irish ===
- Nobel (Coiscéim 1999)
- Cirt Oibre (Coiscéim 1980)
- Fuil agus Fallaí (Coiscéim 1983)
- Aoife faoi Ghlas (BAC: Coiscéim 1990)
- An Sagart Pinc (Coiscéim 1990)

=== Poetry in English ===
- Poetry Quatros. Dublin: Runa, 1943–45
- Tidings. Dolmen for Runa (1958)
- Songs of Living (1961)
- Sarah, in Passing (Dublin: Dolmen 1974), (Illustrated by John Hodge)
- Flesh – The Greatest Sin (Dublin: Runa Press 1980)
- My Darling Neighbour (Belfast: Beaver Row Press 1985)
- Let Live (Galway: Salmon Publ. Co. 1990)
- Spatial Nosing: New and Selected Poems. (Galway: Salmon Poetry, 1993)

=== Fiction ===
- Degrees of Kindred (Tansy Books 1979), novel
- Patterns and other Stories (Poolbeg 1981)
- The Love Riddle (Attic Press 1993), novel

=== Other writings ===
- "Mullaghareirk: Aspects in Perspective". Author writes about her youth in the Eire-Ireland Review, ed. Michael O'Siadhail
- 'Thomas Mann Country' in Poetry Ireland Review, ed. Michael O'Siadhail

=== Translation ===
- ‘Tetrach of Galilee’, translated by Eithne Strong in The Finest Stories of Padraic Ó Conaire, 15 short stories, with other writers (Dublin, Poolbeg 1982) 32-45

=== Criticism ===
- Bertram, Vicki. ed. Kicking Daffodils: Twentieth Century Women Poets. Smyth, Ailbhe .Dodging Around the Grand Piano: Sex, Politics and Contemporary Irish Women's Poetry. Edinburgh University Press, 1997. 56–83.
- Clifton, Harry. Available Air: The Role of Women in Contemporary Irish Poetry 1975–1985. Krino, No. 7, 1989, pp. 20–30.
- Colum, Padraic. Introduction to Songs of Living, Dublin: Runa, 1961, 7 -8.
- Consalvo, Deborah Mcwilliams. Review of the Love Riddle. Irish Studies Review 4, no. 3 (January 1996) 52-53.
- Haberstroh, Patricia Boyle. "Eithne Strong" in Women Creating Women: Contemporary Irish Women Poets. Syracuse, NY: Syracuse University Press, 2001.
- Haberstroh, Patricia Boyle. ed. My Self, My Muse: Irish Women Poets Reflect on Life and Art. Syracuse, NY: Syracuse University Press, 2001.
- Heininger, Joseph, Eithne Strong in Gonzalez, Alexander, (ed.) Irish Women Writers: an A to Z Guide, Greenwood, 2006, pp. 303–8.
- McWilliams, Deborah H. Eithne Strong in Gonzalez, Alexander (ed). Modern Irish Writers: A Bio-Critical Sourcebook, Aldwych Press, London, 1997, pp. 390–93.
- O'Donnell, Mary. "Introduction". In Spatial Nosing: New and Selected Poems. Galway: Salmon, 1993
- Ó Dúshláine Tadhg. Southword, Vol, 2, No.1, Winter 1999."The Magnanimous Poetry of Eithne Strong". Review of "Nobel" published by Coisceim 1998.
- Smyth, Ailbhe. ed. Wildish Things: An Anthology of New Irish Women's Writing. Attic, 1989, 1990.
- Terente, Ines Praga. A Voice of Their Own? The Role of Women in Contemporary Irish Poetry. Universidad de Valladolid Revista Alicantina de Estudios Ingleses 5 (1992): 131–41.
