= Shiel =

Shiel is the name of:

- Derek Shiel (1939–2017) painter and sculptor
- Dylan Shiel (born 1993), footballer
- George Knox Shiel (1825–1893), Democratic US congressman
- Graham Shiel (born 1970), rugby coach
- John Shiel (1917–2013), professional footballer
- M. P. Shiel (1865–1947), British writer
- Richard Lalor Shiel (1791–1871), Irish politician, writer and orator
- Tim Shiel, musician

See also: Ó Siadhail

== Places ==
- Glen Shiel, Scotland
- Loch Shiel, Scotland
- River Shiel, Scotland
- Shiel Bridge, Scotland
- Shiel Hill, Dunedin

== See also ==
- Shiell
- Shiels
- The Works of M. P. Shiel
- Kevin O'Shiel (1891–1970), politician
