= Shiell =

Shiell is a surname. Notable people with this surname include:

- Alan Shiell (born 1945), Australian cricketer
- Hugh Shiell (died 1785?), Irish physician, patriot of the American Revolution
- Jason Shiell (born 1976), American baseball player
- Maisie Shiell (1916–2008), Canadian environmentalist
- Matthew Phipps Shiell, known as M. P. Shiel (1865–1947), British writer
- Michael Shiell (fl. 1693–1698), Guardian of Killeigh, Ireland

== See also ==
- Grant Shiells (born 1989), Scottish rugby union player
- Shiel
- Shiels
- Dashiell
