= Eoghan Carrach Ó Siadhail =

16th century Irish poet

Eoghan Carrach Ó Siadhail (fl. c. 1500–1550) was a poet from County Donegal who wrote in Irish.

== Biography ==
Eoghan Carrach was a member of the Ó Siadhail family of Tír Chonaill (now County Donegal). Under the patronage of Niall Connallach (Niall Óg Ó Neill, died 1544), he made a copy of Beatha Cholm Cille. It now exists as University College Dublin, MS A. 8.

== See also ==
- Ó Siadhail
- James Shields (Ohio politician)
- Frank Shields
- Micheal O'Siadhail, poet
- Seán Ó Siadhail
