= Shiels =

Shiels is the name of:

- Amy Shiels (born 1991), actress
- Brush Shiels (born 1945), musician
- Clark Shiels (born 1989), Welsh wheelchair curler
- Dean Shiels (born 1985), footballer
- Dennis Shiels (born 1938), footballer
- Drummond Shiels (1881–1953), politician
- George Shiels (1881–1949), dramatist
- George F. Shiels (1863–1943), surgeon
- Jackie Shiels (born 1985), rugby union player
- Karl Shiels (1971–2019), Irish actor
- Kenny Shiels (born 1956), football player and manager
- Liam Shiels (born 1991), footballer
- Meredith Shiels, American cancer epidemiologist
- Michael Patrick Shiels, radio host
- Paul Shiels (born 1989), hurler
- Peter Shiels (born 1973), rugby league footballer
- Robert Shiels (died 1753), literary compiler
- Ted Shiels (1908–1987), Australian rules footballer
- Tony "Doc" Shiels (born 1938), artist and magician
- William Shiels (1848–1904), politician
- William Shiels (artist) (1783-1857), Artist

== See also ==
- Shiel, surname
- Shields (surname)
- Shiell
- Shiels Jewellers, Australian company
- Thomas Shiels House, Dallas, Texas
