= Julia Usher =

English musician

Julia Usher (born 1945) is an English musician, project animateur and composer, and is known for musical theater. Besides composing, she also works as a music therapist.

== Biography ==
Julia Usher began music studies at York University and Cambridge, and studied under Robert Sherlaw Johnson. She graduated with a Master of Arts degree and afterward lived and worked in London.

In 1980 Usher set up the composer-publishing firm Primavera with Welsh composer Enid Luff. Usher was a founding member of Women in Music in 1987, and she has worked with ensembles including Sounds Positive, the New London Wind Ensemble, the Nash Ensemble, E2K, Ivor Bolton and Inter Artes. In the 1980s, Usher collaborated in a series of cross-arts projects with the sound sculptor and painter Derek Shiel.

In 1999 Usher moved to Colchester and since 2001 has concentrated on developing works within community arts projects in North Essex. Usher has worked as Composer in Residence with the Colchester Youth Chamber Orchestra. As part of the Lullaby Project in Colchester she recorded, transcribed, and translated songs (with the help of the contributors) to provide English versions of traditional folk songs from different cultures. Her compositions have won awards including the Wangford Festival Prize and a British Clavichord Society prize. Recordings of her work have been issued on CD/DVD, and she has conducted music therapy sessions for Nordoff-Robbins.

== Works ==
A review in the London Evening Standard described Usher's contribution to the Shiel/Usher collaboration:

"The second breakthrough came when a composer, Julia Usher, discovered she could notate the timbre and pitch of these strange objects and so compose music for them. This led to a series of collaborations, notably A Celebration of Blake's Vision at St James's Church, Piccadilly, in 1987, and Soundpaint performances where Usher plays while Shiel paints; he recently splashed out in colour for eight hours in front of a live audience."

Selected works by Julia Usher include:

- 1980 A Reed in the Wind (Solo Oboe) Wangford Festival Prize
- 1986 The Orford Merman (Music Theatre)
- 1989 Marak (Piano Solo) 4 short abstract pieces
- 1993 Sacred Conversations (mixed ensemble)
- 1996 Genetic Code, orchestral piece
- 2001 Before Light Ends (Piano Solo)
- 2002 Lost Icons Wind quintet
- 2002 Magnificat, commissioned by Women in Music for the Millennium
- 2004 Clavicle (Clavichord) Prize from British Clavichord Society
- 2005 Periodic Table lll for cl, ob, va, pf
- 2005 Unruly Sun ( vn, vcl, harpsichord) commissioned by Semley Festival, Dorset
- 2007 Malkin, Theatre Piece (chamber ensemble)

Other:

- Unfinished Business
- Constellations (1980) flute solo suite
- SoundPaint (1995–98) live improvisation performance piece
- Vocalism
- When I Saw the Learned Astronomer
- Moths and Moonlight
- The Lullaby Project
- A World of Song

== Discography ==
- Sacred Physic: Music by Julia Usher (2004) - Audio CD by Julia Usher, Janet Simpson, Peter Lawson, and Lesley-Jane Rogers
- Touching the Wall: Performance with synchronised graphic imagery of Usher's Clavicle by Andrea Gregori, DVD, 2007.
- Selected Oboe Exam Recordings (2006) ABRSM
