= Jovan Belcher =

American football player (1987–2012)

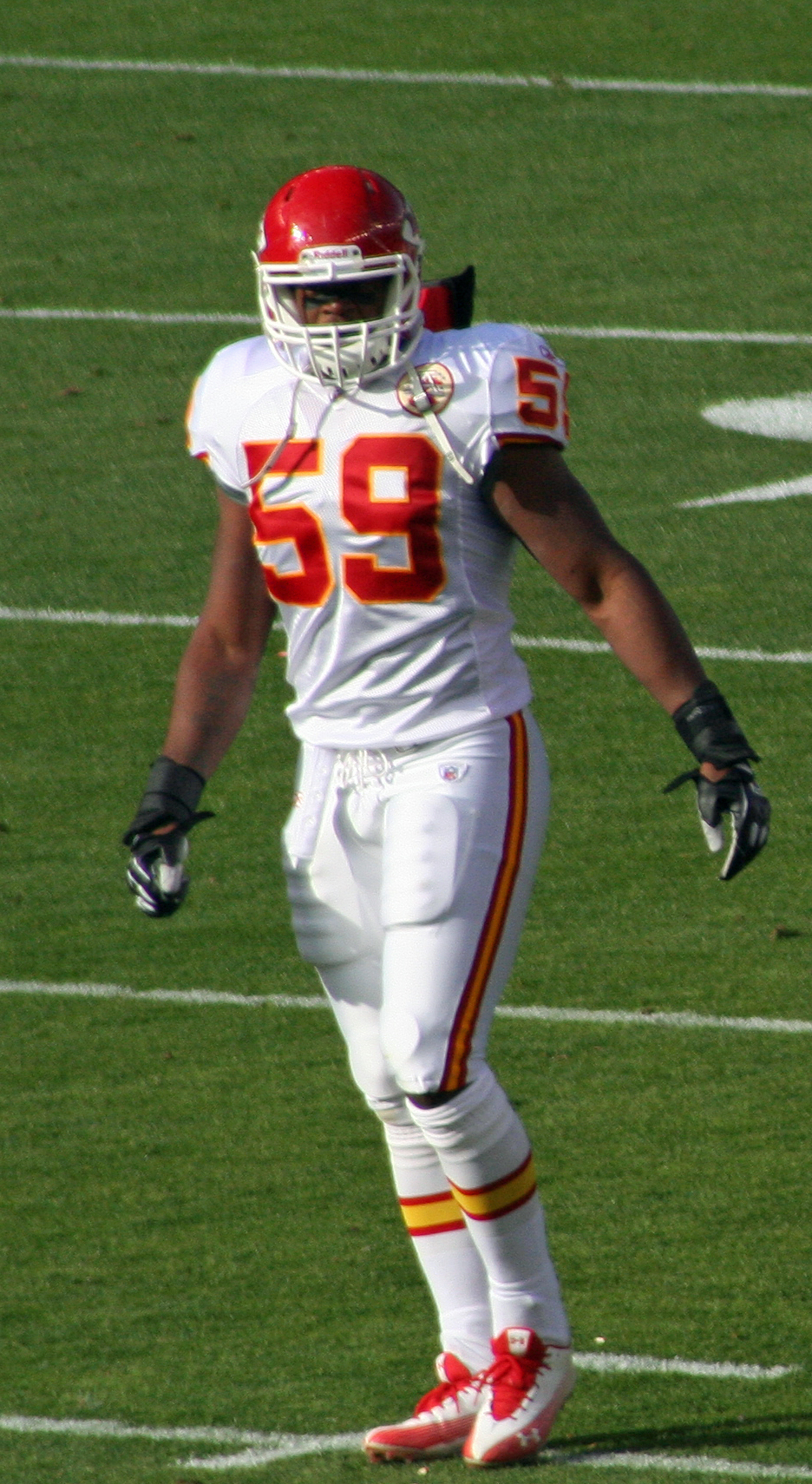
- Belcher with the Kansas City Chiefs in 2010

No. 59
- Position: Linebacker

Personal information
- Born: July 24, 1987; West Babylon, New York, U.S.
- Died: December 1, 2012 (aged 25); Kansas City, Missouri, U.S.
- Listed height: 6 ft 2 in (1.88 m)
- Listed weight: 228 lb (103 kg)

Career information
- High school: West Babylon (NY)
- College: Maine (2005–2008)
- NFL draft: 2009: undrafted

Career history
- Kansas City Chiefs (2009–2012)

Awards and highlights
- First-team FCS All-American (2008)

Career NFL statistics
- Total tackles: 257
- Sacks: 1.0
- Forced fumbles: 1
- Stats at Pro Football Reference

Jovan Henry Allen Belcher (July 24, 1987 – December 1, 2012) was an American professional football player who was a linebacker in the National Football League (NFL). He played his entire three-year career with the Kansas City Chiefs before murdering his girlfriend and committing suicide.

Belcher grew up in West Babylon, New York and was a standout high school athlete before attending and graduating from the University of Maine, where he played for the Maine Black Bears football team. Belcher was named an All-American twice in college after switching in his junior year from linebacker to defensive end. He was considered a strong small-school NFL prospect but was not selected in the 2009 NFL draft. He was later signed as a free agent by the Chiefs and became a regular starter at inside linebacker in 2010. His most productive season was in 2011 when he had 61 tackles and 26 assists. He was re-signed by Kansas City before the 2012 season and played in the team's first 11 games before his death.

Belcher died on December 1, 2012, in a murder–suicide, killing his girlfriend, 22-year-old Kasandra Perkins, before driving to the Chiefs' training facility and shooting himself in the head with a handgun.

== Early life ==
The son of John Belcher and Cheryl Shepard, Belcher grew up on Long Island, New York, and attended West Babylon High School in West Babylon, New York. He wrestled and played football there under head coach Albert Ritacco between 2001 and 2004. He was a three-time All-American as a wrestler, and played as a linebacker, offensive tackle, nose guard, and fullback on the football team. He was captain of the football team for two seasons and led West Babylon to two Long Island Football Championships playoff appearances, although the team did not reach the title game. The team had its first-ever undefeated regular season in 2004, when Belcher was a senior, but lost in the Suffolk County Championship game. The school retired his number 52 jersey, and he returned to the school frequently later in his career to give pregame speeches to the team. Though he had an accomplished high school career, was a second-team All-Long Island selection in 2004, and was named to Newsday's list of the best players of the decade for the 2000s, Belcher was not heavily recruited by major college football programs.

== College career ==
Belcher attended the University of Maine, a Division I FCS school, and played on its Black Bears football team. Playing as an outside linebacker, he was fourth on the team in tackles in his first two seasons, registering 58 as a freshman in 2005 and 52 as a sophomore in 2006.

Belcher had a standout season as a junior after he was switched from linebacker to defensive end. The Associated Press named him a second-team All-American, while Sports Network named him a third-team All-American. He led Maine's collegiate conference, the Colonial Athletic Association (CAA), with 10 sacks and 17 tackles for a loss. His sacks total was seventh-highest in the nation.

Belcher was named a second-team preseason All-American by Lindy's Publications before his senior season in 2008, when he also served as a team co-captain. He led the CAA again with 17.5 tackles for losses. He also had 7.5 sacks and was the association's defensive player of the year. After the season, Belcher was named by the American Football Coaches Association and the Walter Camp Foundation as a first-team All-American in the Football Championship Subdivision, a grouping of smaller schools in the National Collegiate Athletic Association's Division I. He was the fourth multiple-time All-American in Black Bears history, following John Huard, Aaron Dashiell, and Stephen Cooper.

Belcher, a strong student in high school and college, graduated from Maine with a degree in child development and family relations. "He always did his work, sat right up front," Ritacco, Belcher's high school coach and 10th-grade biology teacher, said later. After graduating from college, he won an Academic Momentum Award from the National Consortium for Academics and Sports Scholar-Baller Program.

== Professional career ==
Prior to the 2009 NFL draft, Belcher was considered one of the best small-school prospects and was expected to move to outside linebacker in the NFL. He was projected by Sports Illustrated as a sixth-round draft pick.

Pre-draft measurables
| Height | Weight | 40-yard dash | 10-yard split | 20-yard split | 20-yard shuttle | Three-cone drill | Vertical jump | Broad jump | Bench press |
|---|---|---|---|---|---|---|---|---|---|
| 6 ft 1 3/8 in (1.86 m) | 243 lb (110 kg) | 4.88 s | 1.64 s | 2.89 s | 4.25 s | 7.07 s | 30 in (0.76 m) | 9 ft 0 in (2.74 m) | 19 reps |
All values from Maine Pro Day

After going undrafted, Belcher signed a free agent contract with the Chiefs in 2009. At 228 pounds, he was considered small for an inside linebacker, but made three starts as a rookie and played in all of the team's games. He had 33 tackles and two assists as Kansas City finished with a 4–12 win–loss record for last place in the AFC West division. Belcher became a regular starter in the 2010 season, registering 53 tackles and 31 assists. The Chiefs finished with a 10–6 record and reached the playoffs. Kansas City lost 30–7 to the Baltimore Ravens in the wild card round; Belcher had one and a half sacks and nine tackles in the game.

Belcher continued as a starter in the 2011 NFL season, recording 61 tackles and 26 assists. Kansas City finished last in the AFC West with a 7–9 record, and head coach Todd Haley was replaced by defensive coordinator Romeo Crennel with three games remaining in the season. The Chiefs re-signed Belcher in March 2012 to a one-year contract worth around $1.9 million. During the 2012 season, Belcher played in all 11 games, starting 10, prior to his death. He had 33 tackles and five assists.

== NFL career statistics ==
Legend
| **Bold** | Career high |

=== Regular season ===
| Year | Team | Games | | Tackles | | | | | Interceptions | | | | | Fumbles | | | |
| Year | Team | GP | GS | Cmb | Solo | Ast | Sck | TFL | Int | Yds | TD | Lng | PD | FF | FR | Yds | TD |
|---|---|---|---|---|---|---|---|---|---|---|---|---|---|---|---|---|---|
| 2009 | KC | 16 | 3 | 48 | 46 | 2 | 0.0 | 2 | 0 | 0 | 0 | 0 | **1** | 0 | 0 | 0 | 0 |
| 2010 | KC | 16 | 15 | 84 | 53 | **31** | **1.0** | **4** | 0 | 0 | 0 | 0 | **1** | **1** | 0 | 0 | 0 |
| 2011 | KC | 16 | 16 | **87** | **61** | 26 | 0.0 | 2 | 0 | 0 | 0 | 0 | **1** | 0 | 0 | 0 | 0 |
| 2012 | KC | 11 | 10 | 38 | 33 | 5 | 0.0 | 2 | 0 | 0 | 0 | 0 | **1** | 0 | 0 | 0 | 0 |
| | | 59 | 44 | 257 | 193 | 64 | 1.0 | 10 | 0 | 0 | 0 | 0 | 4 | 1 | 0 | 0 | 0 |

=== Playoffs ===
| Year | Team | Games | | Tackles | | | | | Interceptions | | | | | Fumbles | | | |
| Year | Team | GP | GS | Cmb | Solo | Ast | Sck | TFL | Int | Yds | TD | Lng | PD | FF | FR | Yds | TD |
|---|---|---|---|---|---|---|---|---|---|---|---|---|---|---|---|---|---|
| 2010 | KC | 1 | 1 | 11 | 7 | 4 | 1.5 | 2 | 0 | 0 | 0 | 0 | 0 | 0 | 0 | 0 | 0 |
| | | 1 | 1 | 11 | 7 | 4 | 1.5 | 2 | 0 | 0 | 0 | 0 | 0 | 0 | 0 | 0 | 0 |

== Personal life ==
Belcher was involved in community activities in Kansas City in 2011, visiting a nearby military base and a local elementary school to promote an NFL program for children. He also traveled back to West Babylon every year and gave motivational speeches to students.

== Murder–suicide ==
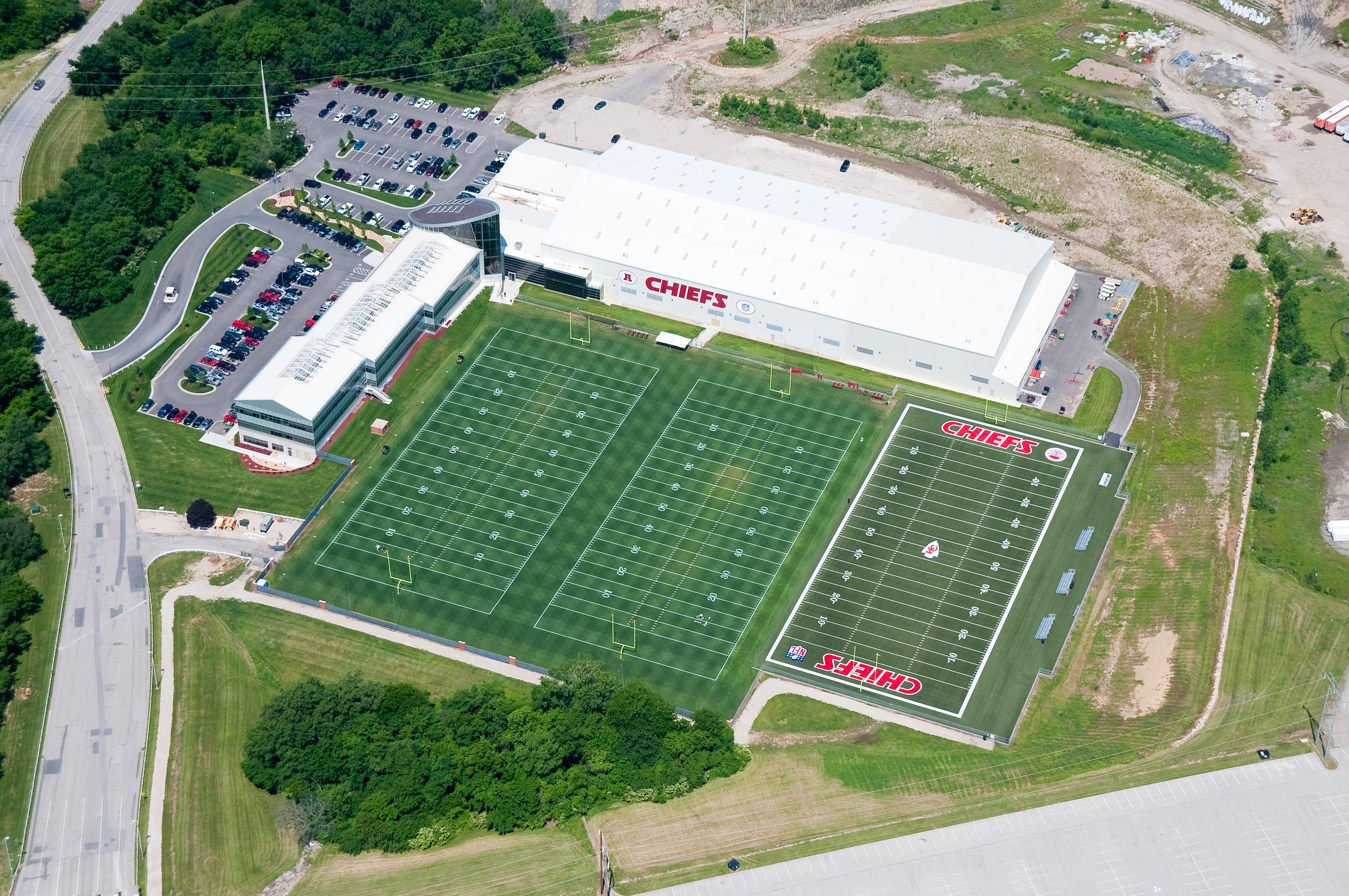
The Chiefs' practice facility near Arrowhead Stadium where Belcher killed himself

By late 2012, Belcher was living with his girlfriend, Kasandra Perkins, and their three-month-old child, at 5401 Crysler Avenue in Kansas City. Belcher and Perkins were introduced through Chiefs running back Jamaal Charles, whose wife was a first cousin of Perkins. Perkins had also done volunteer work in the community, and with the Chiefs as part of its Women's Organization, a group of players' wives and significant others who do charity work and run awareness campaigns. Friends stated that the couple argued frequently, including after Perkins returned home at 1:00 A.M. from a Trey Songz concert at the Midland Theatre on the night of November 30, 2012. After the argument, Perkins went to the Power and Light District, an entertainment area by the Midland and T-Mobile Center in downtown Kansas City. Belcher was also in the Power and Light District with a different woman. After losing the woman in the crowd, Belcher drove to her apartment, but she was not home at the time. The police found him there at 2:50 A.M., after receiving a 911 call about a suspicious person in a car parked on Armour Boulevard. He told the police he was waiting for his girlfriend, and forgot the code to her apartment. The police discussed the temporary tags on the car and urged him to go inside the building, saying they were "trying to cut [him] a break here." Belcher did not smell of alcohol and was not slurring his words, they said. He was later buzzed into the building by neighbors and allowed to stay for the night.

Belcher returned home between 6:30 A.M. and 7:00 A.M. and had another argument with Perkins. In the ensuing discussion, Belcher drew a handgun and fatally shot Perkins in front of his mother, Cheryl Shepherd. The police arrived at the house at around 7:50 A.M., following a call from Shepherd, who had recently moved there from West Babylon, New York, to help the couple care for their child. The baby was heard crying in the background when Belcher's mother called the police. Perkins, who was 22 years old at the time, had been shot in the neck, chest, abdomen, hip, back, leg, and hand, a total of nine times.

After murdering Perkins, Belcher drove his 2007 Bentley Continental GT about five miles to a parking lot at the Chiefs' practice facility next to Arrowhead Stadium. He stepped out of the car with a gun pointed to his head when he encountered Chiefs general manager Scott Pioli. Belcher told Pioli that he had just murdered his girlfriend, and thanked him before asking for Pioli and Chiefs owner Clark Hunt to take care of his daughter. Pioli tried to persuade Belcher to drop the gun. Then, Chiefs head coach Romeo Crennel, along with linebackers coach Gary Gibbs, arrived and joined the effort. The police were dispatched to the scene at 8:01 A.M. As the sound of sirens approached, Belcher told the men that he had to kill himself and "can't be here." He knelt down by a car, made a sign of the cross, and shot himself in the head. A photograph from the scene showed Perkins's blood smeared over the chrome gearshift of Belcher's vehicle, as well as broken glass on the dashboard.

On January 14, 2013, the Jackson County Medical Examiner's office released autopsy reports, showing that Belcher had a blood alcohol content of 0.170 mg/dL in his system, more than double the legal driving limit in Missouri.

The Chiefs had a game scheduled at Arrowhead against the also-struggling Carolina Panthers the day after the murder–suicide. The game went on as scheduled, following discussions between the NFL, Crennel, and the Chiefs' team captains. No formal mention was made of the shooting at the game, although there was a moment of silence for "victims of domestic violence and their families". The Chiefs won the game, 27–21.

Belcher had chronic traumatic encephalopathy (CTE) at the time of his death, according to a medical report.

A service for Belcher was held on December 5 at the Landmark International Deliverance and Worship Center just southwest of Arrowhead Stadium. The Chiefs' practice was scheduled around the event. Pioli and one of Belcher's uncles spoke at the closed service. A funeral for Perkins took place the following day at the Ridgeview Family Fellowship in Blue Ridge, Texas. Another service was held December 8 in Austin, Texas, where her father lives; Perkins was buried in Pflugerville, Texas. Clark Hunt attended the service.

The police revealed that the handgun Belcher used to kill his girlfriend was different from the one he used to take his own life. Belcher had other guns at his house, some of which he would use at a shooting range. All were legally owned. The day after the shooting, NBC broadcaster Bob Costas, quoting Jason Whitlock, said during a segment of Sunday Night Football that "in the coming days, Jovan Belcher's actions and their possible connection to football will be analyzed. Who knows? But here, wrote Jason Whitlock, is what I believe. If Jovan Belcher didn't possess a gun, he and Kasandra Perkins would both be alive today." The comments prompted criticism and support from both sides of the gun control issue.

Belcher was buried on December 12 at the North Babylon Cemetery in North Babylon, New York, following an open casket funeral at the Upper Room Christian Church in Dix Hills, New York. The hearse passed his childhood home in West Babylon en route to the cemetery.

This incident drew multiple comparisons to a similar incident in 2007 involving professional wrestler Chris Benoit, who murdered his wife and youngest son before committing suicide.

=== Wrongful death lawsuit ===
In December 2013, his body was exhumed from the North Babylon cemetery at the request of his family to conduct tests on whether he had chronic traumatic encephalopathy (CTE). On December 31, 2013, Belcher's mother filed a wrongful death lawsuit in Missouri state court against her son's former team, the Kansas City Chiefs.

The lawsuit claimed that "In the months leading up to Decedent's death, Defendant was aware of Decedent's symptoms and signs of cognitive and neuropsychiatric impairment. Defendant micromanaged virtually every aspect of Decedent's life when it came to his physical abilities to perform in the workplace, including analyzing his diet, speed, strength and body-mass index. Yet when it came to monitoring Decedent's mental health and neurological capacities, Defendant disregarded evidence of impairments and fostered an environment where Decedent was required to play through his injuries and become exposed to further neurological harm."

On September 29, 2014, ESPN released a report completed by a medical examiner, who determined that Belcher had CTE. He was one of at least 345 NFL players to be diagnosed after death with this disease, which is caused by repeated hits to the head.

== See also ==
- List of American football players who died during their career
- List of suicides (A–M)
- List of NFL players with chronic traumatic encephalopathy
