= Enid Luff =

Welsh musician (1935–2022)

Enid Luff (21 February 1935 – 19 February 2022) was a Welsh musician, music educator, and composer.

== Biography ==
Luff was born in Ebbw Vale, Wales, and trained as a pianist. She was educated at the University of Wales and Cambridge and graduated with a Master of Arts degree. She took time out from her career for a family, and then studied piano at Royal Northern College. A Welsh Arts Council Bursary allowed her to study with Elisabeth Lutyens, Anthony Payne and Franco Donatoni.

After ending her musical studies, Luff lived and worked for many years in London, Manchester and Birmingham, where she taught at the University School of Continuing Studies. She founded a music publishing firm with composer Julia Usher called Primavera. Luff resided in Cardiff. She died on 19th February 2022, two days short of her 87th birthday.

== Works ==
Luff composed a large number of works for solo instruments, chamber ensembles, voice, choir and piano orchestra.

Selected works include:

- 1971: Tapestries (for clarinet, viola, cello, piano)
- 1972: Thanksgiving At Morning Prayer (for choir)
- 1973: The Bird (for choir)
- 1973: String Quartet No. 2
- 1973: Four Pieces (for piano)
- 1973: Mixed Feelings (five short mood pieces for piano)
- 1974: Y Cerddi Gloyw (for baritone, clarinet, guitar, percussion)
- 1974: Spring Bereaved (for baritone and guitar)
- 1974: Statements (for piano)
- 1975: Counterpoints (for soprano and piano)
- 1975: Five Nocturnes (for soprano and piano)
- 1975: Three Pieces (for ensemble)
- 1976: String Quartet No.3, ‘About Phaedra’
- 1977: The Mad Maid In Summer (song cycle for choir, flute, horn)
- 1977: Weather And Mouth Music (for soprano and double bass)
- 1978: Mathematical Dream (for harp) revised 1983
- 1978: Three Shakespeare Sonnets (for voice, violin, piano)
- 1979: Canto and Doubles (for unaccompanied flute)
- 1979: Vox Ultimate Crucis (for baritone and piano)
- 1979: Christmas Night (for choir)
- 1980: Midsummer Night’s Dream (for flute and piano)
- 1980: The Coastal Road (for wind quintet)
- 1980: Three Japanese Songs (for soprano/tenor and piano)
- 1981: Sŵn Dwr (for flute, mezzo-soprano, piano)
- 1982: Swiss Interiors (for two flutes)
- 1985: Dream Time For Bells (for flute, cello, vibraphone, harp, percussion, piano)
- 1985: Sky Whispering (for piano)
- 1986: Piano Sonata, ‘Storm Tide’
- 1986: Bell Tower (for piano)
- 1986: Ships (for piano)
- 1986: Come The Morning (for ensemble)
- 1987: The Hands of God (for choir)
- 1987: The Haunted Nightclub (for piano)
- 1989: Arctic Landscapes (for two flutes)
- 1989: Sleep, Sleep, February (for flute, oboe, clarinet, piano)
- 1990: God Our Mother (for choir, soprano, organ)
- 1990: Rags (for piano and electronics)
- 1991: Listening For The Roar Of The Sun (for oboe and speaker)
- 1992: Listening for the Roar of the Sun (for solo oboe, dancer, speaker, slides)
- 1993: Symphony No. 2 ‘Down’ (for orchestra)
- 1995: Meister Eckhart’s Flute (for unaccompanied flute)
- 1995: The Patchwork Miles (for flute and piano)
- 1995: Lament For The Ashes of Language (for soprano, clarinet, piano)
- 1996: Lullaby (for viola)
- 1997: The Glass Wall (three dancers, solo cello, and electronic tape)
- 1997: Variations On The Waters Of Eden (for piano trio)
- 1997: Studies for the Glass Wall (for solo cello)
- 1998: Movements For String Quartet
- 1998: Shallow Sea (for flute, oboe, clarinet, piano)
- 1998: Raven (for unaccompanied cello)
- 1999: Telyneg (Lyric for oboe and harp)
- 1999: Shallow Sea With Dancing (for oboe and violin)
- 1999: Hierusalem (for ensemble)
- 2000: The Footprints of the Storm (for violin and piano)
- 2001: The Wake (for unaccompanied oboe)
- 2002: Heaven’s Bird (for flute, guitar, viola, cello)
- 2004: About The Wind (for flute and piano)
- 2005: The Sea And The Garden (for flute, viola, cello, piano)
- 2009: The Water Diviner (two songs for unaccompanied soprano)
- 2013: Three Steps In The Dark (for string quartet)
- 2014: Sad Story (for flute, horn, trombone)

Unsure composition dates:

? The Lodging (carol for choir)

? Weary Was The Walking (carol for two treble voice and organ)

? ‘…trees dropped forth pearls… (for guitar) 2014

? ‘…the horror of war and the pity of it…’ (for unaccompanied viola)

? From Switzerland (for flute, clarinet, piano)

? At Crack of Winter (for orchestra)

? By The Waters Of Babylon (for unaccompanied cello)

? Three Praises (for organ)

? The Coming of the Rain (for unaccompanied oboe)

? Lamentation (for trombone and woodwind quintet)

Some of her works are published by Primavera Music (www.impulse-music.co.uk) but there are also scores available to view through the British Music Information Centre (www.britishmusiccollection.org.uk) and Tŷ Cerdd (www.tycerdd.org) which is the information centre for Welsh music and composers, based in Cardiff, Wales.

== Discography ==
- Ariel Composers of Wales, Catherine Handley, flute, and Andrew Wilson-Dickson, piano. Cyfansoddwyr Cymru (2009)
- The Music of Enid Luff Contemporary chamber music. Ty Cerdd.
