= West Babylon High School =

High School in West Babylon for students (grades 9 to 12)

Coordinates: 40.702651°N 73.345113°W

Information
- Established: 1958; 68 years ago
- School district: West Babylon Union Free School District
- Teaching staff: 97.63 (FTE)
- Grades: 9-12
- Enrollment: 1,255 (2023-2024)
- Student to teacher ratio: 12.85
- Colors: Navy blue and gold
- Mascot: Eagle
- Website: https://shs.wbschools.org/

West Babylon Senior High School is a high school at 500 Great East Neck Road, West Babylon, New York in Babylon, Suffolk County on Long Island, New York. It is part of the West Babylon Union Free School District. In 2012, it had an enrollment of 1,531. Its school colors are navy blue and gold, and the mascot is an Eagle. The school was built in 1958. Since then, the school has been fully operational for students from grades 9 to 12. There are three floors all with surrounding staircases on each directional end. The school features two cafeterias, two gymnasiums and an auditorium or "PAC" (Performing Arts Center). Behind the school, there is a football field, baseball field and tennis court.

== Notable alumni ==
- Jovan Belcher, American football linebacker
- John Cygan, actor
- Harold Dieterle, winner of the first season of Top Chef
- Billy Koch, professional baseball relief pitcher
- Sugar and Spice, RuPaul's Drag Race Season 15 contestants and Tiktok stars
- Geraldo Rivera, television personality
