= West Babylon Union Free School District =

School district in New York, United States

Location
- West Babylon, Suffolk County, New York; United States

District information
- Grades: K-12
- President: Christopher Paolillo
- Superintendent: Dr. Yiendhy Farrelly
- Schools: 6

Students and staff
- District mascot: Eagles
- Colors: Navy and yellow

Other information
- District Offices: 10 Farmingdale Rd. West Babylon NY 11704
- Website: www.wbschools.org

The West Babylon Union Free School District is a school district on the South Shore of Long Island in Suffolk County, New York. It serves most of the hamlet of West Babylon and a small part of the hamlet of Babylon in the Town Of Babylon. It has its headquarters in West Babylon.

== History ==
In July 1988 voters approved the spending of $297,606 ($810168.28 when adjusted for inflation) to buy eight school buses, with six with capacities of 60 passengers, one with a capacity of 30 passengers, and one with a capacity of 16 passengers. This vote was approved 891 to 762. In addition, voters approved the school district budget 930 to 731 the same day; the previous month the original budget proposal had not been passed by voters.

== Schools ==
- West Babylon Senior High School
- West Babylon Junior High School

Elementary schools:

- Forest Avenue Elementary School
- John F. Kennedy Elementary School
- Santapogue Elementary School
- South Bay Elementary School
- Tooker Avenue Elementary School
