= Babylon (village), New York =

Babylon, New York
- Village; Town Seat of Babylon
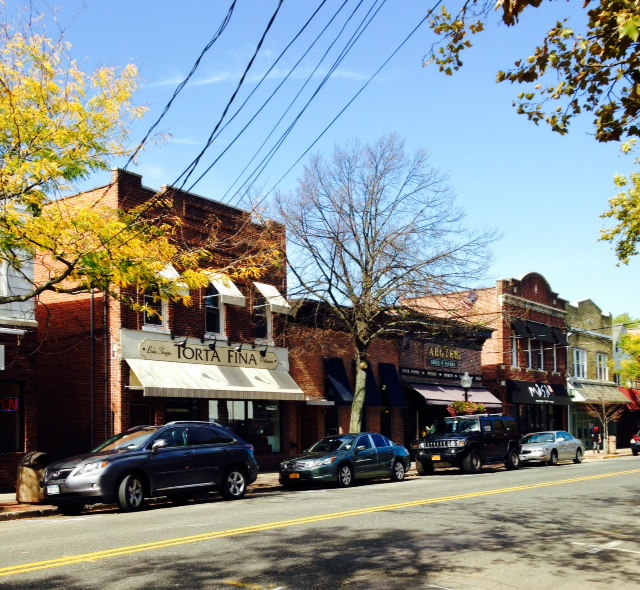
- Deer Park Avenue in Babylon Village

- Seal
- Nicknames: Babylon Village; The Village
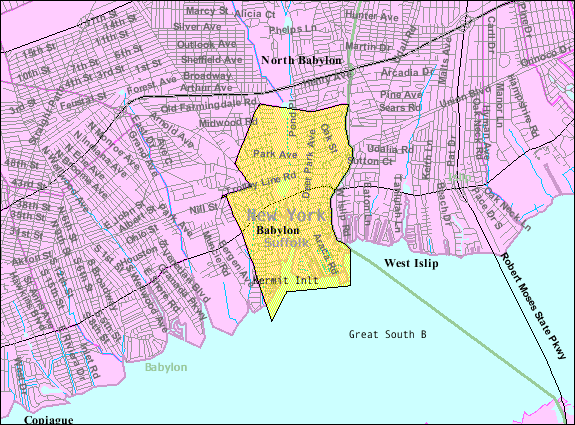

- Location on Long Island Location within the state of New York
- Coordinates: 40°41′40″N 73°19′46″W
- Country: United States
- State: New York
- County: Suffolk
- Town: Babylon
- Incorporated: 1893; 133 years ago

Government
  - Mayor: Mary E. Adams

Area
  - Total: 2.80 sq mi (7.24 km^{2})
  - Land: 2.41 sq mi (6.24 km^{2})
  - Water: 0.38 sq mi (0.99 km^{2})
- Elevation: 6.6 ft (2 m)

Population (2020)
  - Total: 12,188
  - Density: 5,055.9/sq mi (1,952.09/km^{2})
- Time zone: UTC-5 (EST)
  - Summer (DST): UTC-4 (EDT)
- ZIP Code: 11702
- Area codes: 631, 934
- FIPS code: 36-03408
- GNIS feature ID: 0942756
- Website: www.villageofbabylonny.gov

Babylon is a village within the Town of Babylon in Suffolk County, New York. The population was 12,188 at the 2020 census. It is located approximately 25 miles (40 km) from New York City at the Queens border and approximately 33 miles (53 km) from Manhattan.

It is commonly referred to as Babylon Village, to distinguish it from the Town of Babylon, of which it is a part.

== History ==
When a coherent community grew up in the area by 1803, prominent local citizens sought to adopt a new name. An influential local lady, Mrs. Conklin, was used to living inland in what is now considered Dix Hills and was at unease with the home site that her grandchildren would be raised in. The bible-reading Mrs. Conklin compared the new hamlet to the biblical city of Babylon and proposed that name due to the area's rather bawdy reputation as a stop-over place for travelers on Long Island's south shore. Her son Nat was appalled by the use of an "unholy" name. The family legend states she replied: "But it will be a new Babylon."

Babylon had already been settled, as Huntington South, prior to hostilities with the British in the Revolutionary War. The First Presbyterian Church of Islip and Huntington South, as it was then known, was established in 1730. Though the church would later be split into two separate Huntington South and Islip churches in 1857 (the former to be renamed the First Presbyterian Church of Babylon after 1872). However, long before this split, the First Presbyterian Church held services in the original wooden church until 1778 when British soldiers tore down the structure. The wood from the first church was taken west to Hempstead to construct a barracks for British troops. This event was more recent history when, on the eve of the War of 1812, Joshua Hartt gave an impassioned sermon encouraging the young men to defend the United States and prepare for a "righteous war."

Babylon supplied several heroes of the Revolutionary war and War of 1812, some of whom, like continental soldier David Smith who served under George Washington, are buried in the old Babylon Cemetery. Perhaps most prominent was Joel Cook, a veteran of both wars. Citizens of Babylon first honored Captain Joel Cook with a monument unveiled in 1908. Captain Cook served throughout the duration of the Revolutionary War and commanded a Company in the War of 1812.

In July 1814, survivors of the Battle of Valparaiso were led by Captain David Porter through the Fire Island Inlet (which would have been a very difficult task using simply oars) and up to Babylon via Sumpawams Creek. Villagers were shocked to see armed sailors heading into town, and it took time to convince some of the more prominent citizens that Captain Porter was not a British agent. To convince Stephen B. Nichols, Captain Porter even offered him his cutlass and proposed to surrender to him if Nichols truly felt he was the enemy.

In 1885, Many of the Black service personnel of the Argyle Hotel formed a baseball team, the Babylon Black Panthers, said to be the first salaried Black professional baseball team.

Many Babylon village residences and businesses suffered major flood and wind damage from Hurricane Sandy on October 29, 2012.

== Geography ==
According to the United States Census Bureau, the village has a total area of 2.8 square miles (7.1 km^{2}), of which 2.4 square miles (6.2 km^{2}) is land and 0.3 square miles (0.9 km^{2}) (12.32%) is water.

Babylon Village is bordered to the west by West Babylon, to the north by North Babylon, to the east by West Islip, and to the south by the Great South Bay.

== Demographics ==
Historical population
Census	Pop.	Note	%±
1840	250		—
1850	300		20.0%
1860	470		56.7%
1870	1,225		160.6%
1880	2,142		74.9%
1900	2,157		—
1910	2,600		20.5%
1920	2,523		−3.0%
1930	4,342		72.1%
1940	4,742		9.2%
1950	6,015		26.8%
1960	11,062		83.9%
1970	12,897		16.6%
1980	12,388		−3.9%
1990	12,249		−1.1%
2000	12,615		3.0%
2010	12,166		−3.6%
2020	12,188		0.2%
U.S. Decennial Census

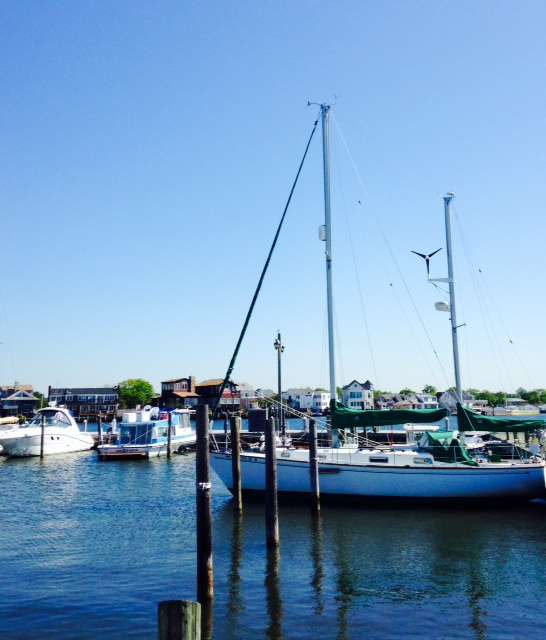
Babylon Village Dock on the Great South Bay

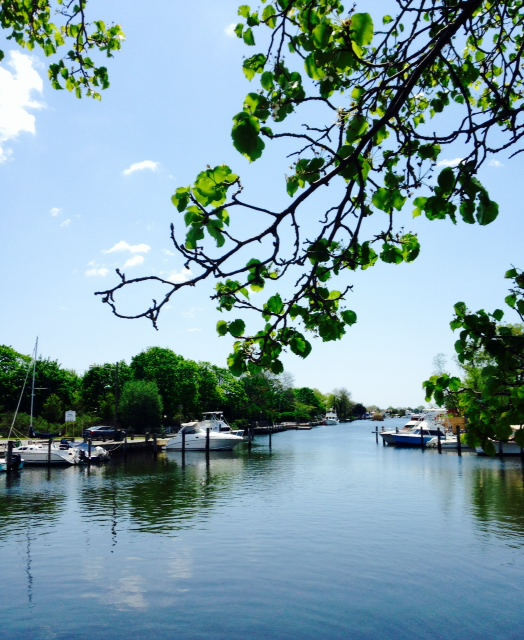
Canal in Babylon Village across from Argyle Lake

As of the census of 2020, there were 12,188 people and 4,676 households in the village, with 2.60 persons per household. The population density was 5,055.2 inhabitants per square mile (1,951.8/km^{2}).

The racial makeup of the village was 89.3% White, 0.6% African American, 0.7% Native American, 1.5% Asian, 0.0% Pacific Islander, and 4.1% from two or more races. Hispanic or Latino of any race were 9.8% of the population. The village was 83.5% non-Hispanic White.

Of the total population, 6.1% were under age 5, 19.0% were under age 18, and 18.7% were over the age of 65. 51.9% of the population was female.

The following data is from the Census' American Community Survey (from 2006 to 2010):

- The homeownership rate was 78.2% and 15.3% of housing units were in multi-unit structures.
- 95.6% of the population had lived in the same house 1 year and over. 8.8% of the entire population were foreign born and 8.6% of residents at least 5 years old spoke a language other than English at home.
- 95.1% of residents at least 25 years old had graduated from high school, and 39.6% of residents at least 25 years old had a bachelor's degree or higher. The mean travel time to work for workers aged 16 and over was 31.4 minutes.
- The median income for a household in the village was $127,407. The per capita income for the village was $44,293. According to the 2010 Census, 4.5% of the population were below the poverty line.

== Arts and culture ==
The non-profit James Street Player theater group, founded in 1967, is one of the earliest on Long Island.

A statue of Robert Moses was erected in front of the Village Hall in 2003.

== Parks and recreation ==
Southards Pond is a man-made pond and town park along the Carlls River. Today, the park features forested walking trails for locals but historically was a source of drinking water and ice. The lake was originally dammed by the Southards brothers to make a drinking pond for their cattle pasture. The Westminster Kennel Club's dog kennels and pigeon hunting ground was located just west of the pond from 1880 to 1904. Robert Moses granted the village a 99-year lease for the park after the village's mayor convinced him against merging it with nearby Belmont Lake State Park.

== Education ==
Public schools located in Babylon are operated by the Babylon Union Free School District, and include:

- Babylon Elementary School
- Babylon Memorial Grade School
- Babylon Junior-Senior High School

== Infrastructure ==
Babylon train station:

- is the terminal for the Babylon Branch of the Long Island Rail Road.
- is served by the Montauk Branch.
- is a hub for buses operated by Suffolk County Transit.

== Notable people ==
- Danielle Ammaccapane, professional golfer and NCAA women's champion.
- Tom Bohrer, two-time Olympic rowing silver medalist.
- Connie Carberg, first female NFL scout
- Rodney Dangerfield, comedian and actor.
- Billy Hayes, author of Midnight Express.
- Joseph Iannuzzi, Gambino crime family mob associate turned mob informant.
- Steve Janaszak, backup goaltender for the 1980 US Olympic ice hockey team.
- Bob Keeshan, television personality: Clarabell the clown; Captain Kangaroo.
- Guglielmo Marconi, inventor of wireless telegraphy.
- Ashley Massaro, former WWE Diva.
- Butterfly McQueen, film actress, best known from role in Gone with the Wind.
- Dan Meuser, US Representative from Pennsylvania
- Robert Moses, urban planner.
- Bret Saberhagen, professional baseball player, Cy Young Award-winning pitcher.
- Mike Scaccia, guitarist for metal bands Ministry, Rigor Mortis and The Revolting Cocks.
- Mary Schapiro, in charge of U.S. Securities and Exchange Commission, graduated from Babylon Junior Senior High School.
- William Shepherd, former Navy SEAL and NASA astronaut; recipient of Congressional Space Medal of Honor.
- Chris Wingert, professional soccer player, currently playing for Real Salt Lake (MLS).
