= Babylon School District =

Public school district on Long Island, New York, United States

Coordinates: 40°41′59.6″N 73°19′27.7″W

Location
- Babylon (village), New York, Suffolk County; United States

District information
- Motto: Exceptional Education Since 1805
- Grades: K-12
- Established: 1805
- President: Linda Jurs
- Superintendent: Carisa A. Manza
- Schools: 3

Students and staff
- Students: 1,527
- District mascot: Panthers
- Colors: Orange and black

Other information
- District Offices: 50 Railroad Avenue Babylon, NY 11702
- Website: www.babylon.k12.ny.us

The Babylon Union Free School District is a school district in Suffolk County, New York on the South Shore of Long Island. The headquarters are in the village of Babylon in the town of Babylon. Along with the majority of the village of Babylon, the district also serves the entirety of Gilgo, Oak Beach, and Captree, along with parts of West Babylon.

== History ==
On June 21, 1961, the district sold $4,577,855 ($49,321,544.68 when adjusted for inflation from the 1961 value) of bonds due from 1962 to 1990 to an investment banking group. The group was headed by Harriman, Ripley Co., Inc.

In 2007 a redesign of the district's website went online.

== Schools ==
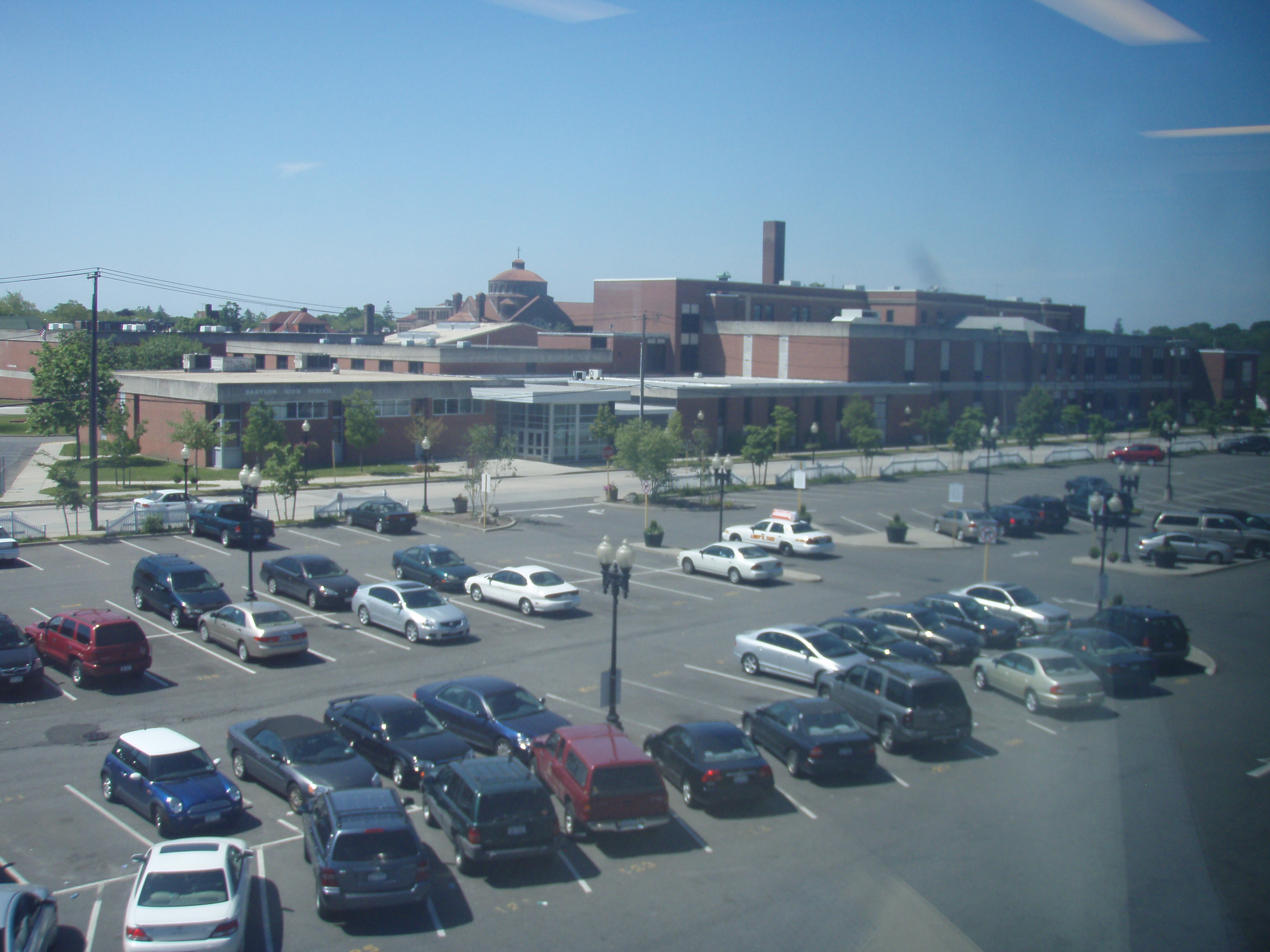
Babylon High School (from the Babylon train station)

- Babylon Junior–Senior High School
- Babylon Memorial Grade School
- Babylon Elementary School
