= Margaret May Dashiell =

American artist and writer (1867–1958)

- Born: Margaret May; January 7, 1867; Louisiana, U.S.
- Died: February 11, 1958 (aged 91); Richmond, Virginia, U.S.
- Resting place: Hollywood Cemetery
- Occupations: Artist; writer

Margaret May Dashiell (January 7, 1867 – February 11, 1958) was an American artist and writer whose works depicted contemporary life in Richmond, Virginia, New Orleans, Louisiana, and Charleston, South Carolina.

== Biography ==
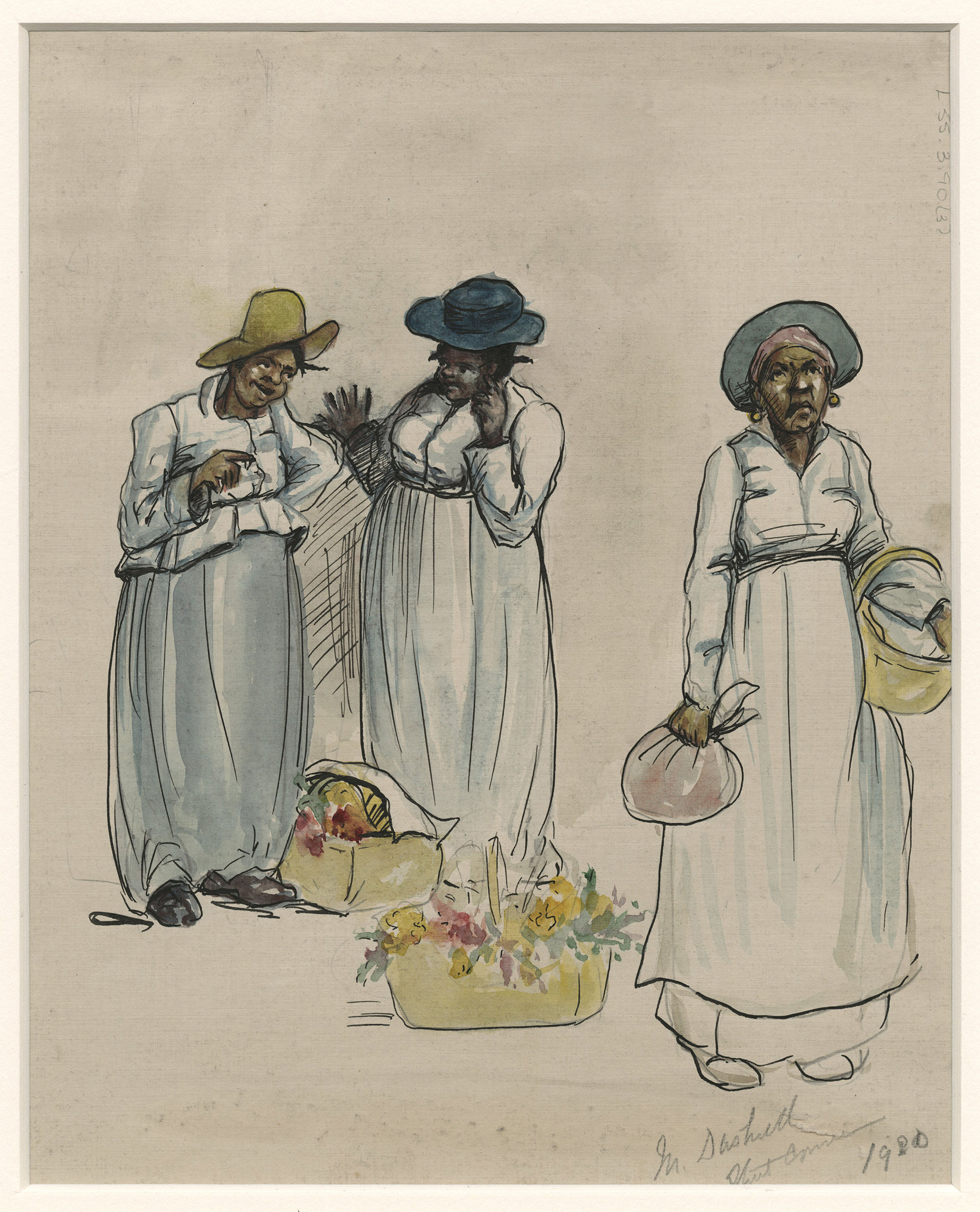
Street Opera [Richmond], 1920

Margaret May Dashiell was born to Thomas P. May and Mary Taylor May in Louisiana on January 7, 1867, where her family owned a plantation in Saint John the Baptist Parish. Thomas P. May was a planter, novelist, and editor of the New Orleans Times. She grew up in New Orleans and was educated at St. Simeon's Select School for Girls and Young Ladies, run by the Catholic Daughters of Charity. After a downturn in family fortunes, they moved to England in the 1880s, where Thomas May died. In 1886, Dashiell's mother moved the family to Richmond. In 1889, Dashiell married merchant John Parker Dashiell, son of the Rev. Thomas Grayson Dashiell of Richmond, VA. They had one child, a son named Searing T. Dashiell.

In Richmond, Dashiell studied art with Edward Virginius Valentine. Dashiell began publicly exhibiting her work in 1896 at the first annual art show of the Art Club of Richmond. Her preferred mediums were in watercolor, wash, and pen and ink, and she depicted genre scenes of both white and black people and local landmarks. Dashiell depicted what she saw as a vanishing way of life in the southern United States, influenced by the widespread Lost Cause mythology of the time. Many of her works depict elderly Confederate veterans. Much of her work depicts the life of lower-class African-American women, though from the sentimental and stereotypical perspective of an upper-class white woman, including visual depictions of domestic workers, street vendors, and mammies, and poems in African-American and Creole dialect.

Dashiell published three volumes of her writing accompanied by her illustrations: Possum (1901) was a collection of verses published " in honor of an oppossum dinner given by Dr. George Ben Johnston." Spanish Moss and English Myrtle (1920) was a collection of poems and sketches about Richmond and New Orleans. Richmond Reverie (1942) was a novel about the relationship between an upper-class southern white family and their African-American domestic servants. Dashiell also illustrated a number of works by others: Uncle Jerry's Platform and Other Christmas Stories (1897) by Gillie Cary, Irwin Russell's 1878 poem Christmas-Night in the Quarters (1948), the cookbook Famous Recipes from Old Virginia (1935), and Haworth Idyll: A Fantasy (1946) by Roberta Trigg, a novel about the Brontë sisters.

From 1915 to 1930, Dashiell operated the Serendipity Shop at 177 North Adams Street in Richmond, where she sold antiques, books, prints, and drawings. She was an active part of Richmond upper-class society and friends with the novelist Ellen Glasgow. She also served on the board of the Richmond Society for the Prevention of Cruelty to Animals beginning in 1900.

Dashiell died at the Protestant Episcopal Home in Richmond on February 11, 1958. She was buried in Hollywood Cemetery.
