= Derek Shiel =

Irish artist and writer

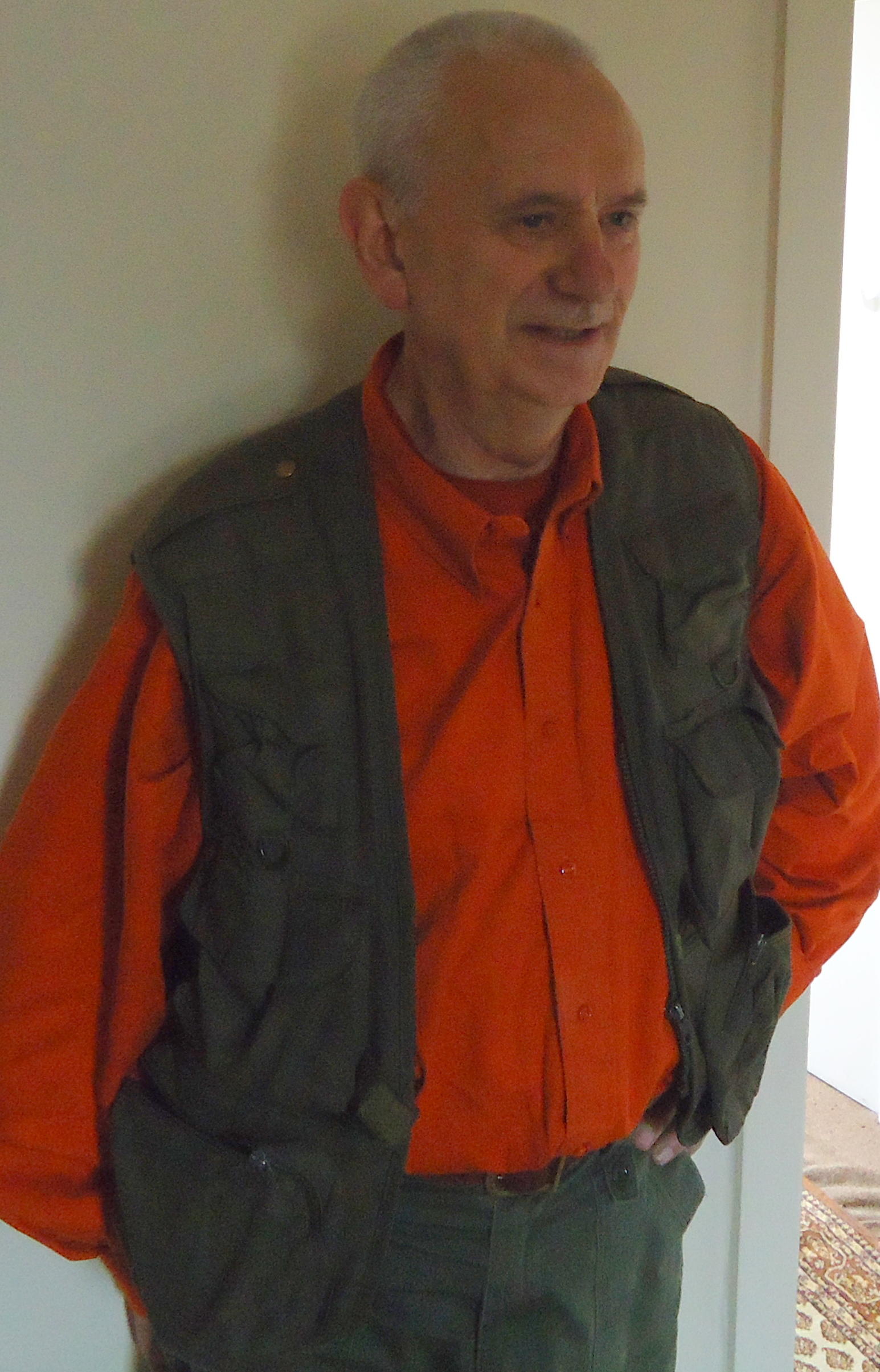
- Painter, sculptor, and writer Derek Shiel
- Born: Derek Alexander George Shiel; 18 April 1939; Dublin, Ireland
- Died: 13 July 2017 (aged 78); Little Venice, London, England
- Education: Fettes College, Edinburgh
- Occupations: Painter, Sculptor, Writer
- Known for: Sculpted Sound
- Notable work: David Jones: The Maker Unmade, with Jonathan Miles

Derek Shiel (18 April 1939 – 13 July 2017) was a Dublin-born, London-based painter, sculptor, writer, and film-maker.

== Biography ==
=== Education ===
Shiel was educated at Fettes College, Edinburgh and the Edinburgh College of Art, where he won the Andrew Grant Scholarship for two years, completed a Diploma in Art, and was awarded a post-graduate studio and a travelling scholarship which he took in the United States of America.

=== Career ===
Shiel took a number of teaching appointments at the outset of his career. These included Art Tutor, Berkshire College of Art from 1963 to 1965, Art Tutor at West Sussex College of Art from 1964 to 1969, and Lecturer in Art Appreciation and Art Tutor at the City Literary Institute, London, 1965 to 1977. His lecturing career has continued in the ensuing years with events at art galleries, museums, universities and art societies, with a particular emphasis on David Jones and Sound Sculptures, subjects on which he also leads workshops. From 1978 to 1998 Shiel practised as a landscape gardener, and between 1993 and 2009 practised as a psychotherapist.

=== Sculpted Sound ===
Sculpted Sound was Shiel's sound sculpture ensemble, of which he was both the artistic director and the sculptor. It comprised twenty metal sculptures which were either used in performance as percussion instruments or simply exhibited as sculpture. The collection was created as a response to John Cage's 1st Construction (in Metal), which Shiel first heard at a time when he had also found scrap metal components in the storeroom of his father's electrical business in Dublin. These components were used for the very first sound sculptures.

From the late eighties, Sculpted Sound established its reputation through performances, exhibitions and recordings. Among its earliest performances was that given at St James's Piccadilly as part of the William Blake Festival in 1987, in a composition by Julia Usher. The ensuing years were marked by increasingly acclaimed appearances, most recently Futurism Updated at The Central School of Speech and Drama in London (2009), which was curated and presented by Shiel, as well as making use of his sculptures. The event was a concert marking the centenary of the publication of the Futurist Manifesto by Filippo Tommaso Marinetti, and was followed by the conference Theatre Noise, at which Shiel led a sound workshop.

As well as performances, Shiel's sculptures have been used as static objects in exhibitions. Notably, he was featured as Artist-in-Residence at the Estorick Collection of Modern Italian Art, London in 2000. More recently, there have been Shiel solo exhibitions at the Gallery Oldham, near Manchester in 2003, and at the Festival of Sound, in Cork, the Republic of Ireland, in 2005.

In addition to the performances and exhibitions, Sculpted Sound has appeared on a number of recordings, including A New Guide to Sound Sculpture and Invented Instruments Vol.1 (FMR Records, 1997).

=== Writing ===
Having begun his writing career with work for theatre, Shiel then wrote an essay in Fathers and Sons, edited by Tom Hyde, a collection of reminiscences of men and the impact their fathers had had on them. The book came about as a result of his involvement in Menswork and as a practising psychotherapist. There followed a series of books about poet and painter David Jones, of which Shiel was either co-author or editor, including David Jones: The Maker Unmade (Seren, 1995), David Jones: Ten Letters (Agenda Editions, 1996), and David Jones in Ditchling (Ditchling Museum, 2003). His lecture, Why and How David Jones Became a Poet was subsequently published by The Honourable Society of Cymmrodorion in England, and Flashpoint magazine in America. Shiel was sole author of Arthur Giardelli, Paintings, Constructions, Relief Sculptures, Conversations with Derek Shiel (Seren, 2000).

=== Theatre ===
Over the course of thirty years of writing and directing for theatre, Shiel has been commissioned by the Caricature Theatre in Cardiff to create a stage adaptation of Gogol's The Overcoat (1980), as well as conceiving, writing and directing a number of his own works. These include Which One of Me? (1981), a one-man show, and Landing Site, an environmental performance at St James's Piccadilly (1981), both starring Colin Harris. The latter also featured percussionists Vivien Loader and Tim Dennis. Currently, Shiel is working on five new monologues for theatre.

His work in puppet theatre spans over thirty years. He began by painting a costume for the performing ensemble Theatre of Puppets, London, and went onto design a puppet for them. For Christopher Leith, he adapted Iron Hans by the Brothers Grimm and painted masks for his production of Beowulf for The Royal National Theatre production in London. As part of his Artist-in-Residence tenure at the Estorick Collection, he performed on his sound sculptures as accompaniment to a puppet show with Lindey Wright. His sound sculptures were also used for a production of Manfred by Byron put on by the Puppet Barge theatre company.

=== Filmwork ===
Shiel wrote and directed In Search of David Jones: Artist, Soldier, Poet (2008), a well-received documentary focussing on the painter and poet's experiences in the First World War, and its impact upon his most famous poetic work In Parenthesis. The film includes interviews with art critic Richard Cork, Welsh poets Gillian Clarke, Owen Sheers, and the Archbishop of Canterbury, Dr Rowan Williams. It was by followed by David Jones Between The Wars: The Years of Achievement (2012), which he co-directed with Adam Alive. The trilogy was completed with David Jones: Innovation and Consolidation (2014) for which Shiel was the sole writer and director.

=== Painting ===
Shiel's paintings in acrylic, both figurative and abstract, have been exhibited since the 1960s in Scotland, England, Switzerland and America. Stylistically, the works are modern and make expressive use of colour.

== Bibliography ==
- Fathers and Sons, Edited by Tom Hyde (includes essay by Derek Shiel), Wolfhound Press, 1995, ISBN 0-86327-515-X
- David Jones: The Maker Unmade, by Jonathan Miles and Derek Shiel, Seren, 1995, ISBN 1-85411-134-5
- Ten Letters to two young artists working in Italy – Juliet Wood and Richard Shirley Smith, by David Jones, Edited by Derek Shiel, Agenda Editions, 1996
- David Jones – Diversity and Unity, Edited by Belinda Humfrey and Anne Price-Owen, contributing essay by Derek Shiel, University of Wales Press, 2000, ISBN 0-7083-1564-X
- Arthur Giardelli – Conversations with Derek Shiel, by Derek Shiel, Seren, 2000, ISBN 1-85411-238-4
- David Jones in Ditchling: 1921–1924, by Derek Shiel, Anthony Hyne, Ewan Clayton, Ditchling Museum, 2003, ISBN 0-9516224-7-1

== Filmography ==
- In Search of David Jones: Artist, Soldier, Poet (2008), Derek Shiel, The David Jones Society.
- David Jones Between the Wars: The Years of Achievement (2012), Derek Shiel and Adam Alive, The David Jones Society.
- David Jones: Innovation and Consolidation (2014), Derek Shiel, The David Jones Society.

== Discography ==
- A New Guide to Sound Sculpture and Invented Instruments (FMR, CD80-0501, 1997)
- FMR Sampler (FMR, Cover-mounted with Avant magazine)
