= West Babylon, New York =

- Hamlet and Census-designated place
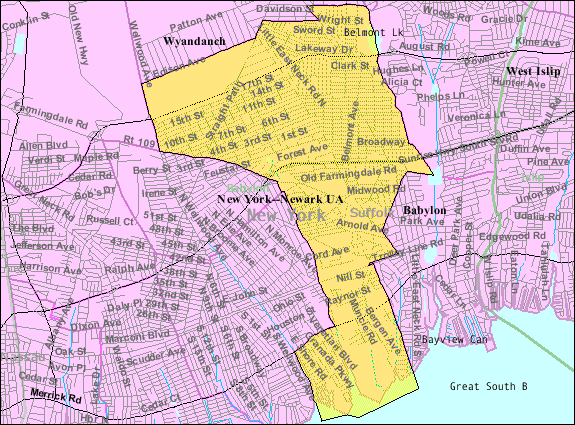
- U.S. Census map

- Location on Long Island Location within the state of New York
- Coordinates: 40°42′48″N 73°21′26″W
- Country: United States
- State: New York
- County: Suffolk
- Town: Babylon

Area
  - Total: 8.76 sq mi (22.70 km^{2})
  - Land: 8.46 sq mi (21.90 km^{2})
  - Water: 0.31 sq mi (0.81 km^{2})
- Elevation: 39 ft (12 m)

Population (2020)
  - Total: 43,213
  - Density: 5,110.8/sq mi (1,973.31/km^{2})
- Time zone: UTC−5 (Eastern (EST))
  - Summer (DST): UTC−4 (EDT)
- ZIP Codes: 11704, 11707
- Area codes: 631, 934
- FIPS code: 36-79246
- GNIS feature ID: 0969082

West Babylon is a hamlet and census-designated place (CDP) located within the Town of Babylon in Suffolk County, on Long Island, in New York, United States. The population was 43,213 at the time of the 2020 census.

== Geography ==
According to the United States Census Bureau, the CDP has a total area of 8.0 square miles (21 km^{2}), of which 7.7 square miles (20 km^{2}) is land and 0.3 square miles (0.78 km^{2}), or 3.87%, is water.

West Babylon is bordered to the west by Lindenhurst and North Lindenhurst, to the northwest by East Farmingdale, to the north by Wyandanch, to the northeast by Deer Park, to the east by North Babylon and the Village of Babylon, and to the south by the Great South Bay.

The peninsula at the southwest end of the CDP is known as Venetian Shores. Served by the Lindenhurst Post Office and the Lindenhurst Union Free School District, this area is commonly associated more with Lindenhurst than with Babylon.

== Demographics ==
Historical population
Census	Pop.	Note	%±
2000	43,452		—
2010	43,213		−0.6%
2020	43,213		0.0%
U.S. Decennial Census

=== 2020 census ===
As of the 2020 census, West Babylon had a population of 43,213. The median age was 41.7 years. 19.9% of residents were under the age of 18 and 16.9% of residents were 65 years of age or older. For every 100 females there were 92.0 males, and for every 100 females age 18 and over there were 90.2 males age 18 and over.

100.0% of residents lived in urban areas, while 0.0% lived in rural areas.

There were 14,523 households in West Babylon, of which 32.2% had children under the age of 18 living in them. Of all households, 49.9% were married-couple households, 16.3% were households with a male householder and no spouse or partner present, and 27.7% were households with a female householder and no spouse or partner present. About 23.0% of all households were made up of individuals and 11.6% had someone living alone who was 65 years of age or older.

There were 15,139 housing units, of which 4.1% were vacant. The homeowner vacancy rate was 0.7% and the rental vacancy rate was 4.5%.

Racial composition as of the 2020 census
Race	Number	Percent
White	28,208	65.3%
Black or African American	5,516	12.8%
American Indian and Alaska Native	221	0.5%
Asian	1,464	3.4%
Native Hawaiian and Other Pacific Islander	10	0.0%
Some other race	3,933	9.1%
Two or more races	3,861	8.9%
Hispanic or Latino (of any race)	8,202	19.0%

=== 2010 census ===
As of the census of 2010, there were 43,213 people and 14,537 households in the CDP, with 2.93 persons per household. The population density was 5,540.1 inhabitants per square mile (2,139.0/km^{2}).

The racial makeup of the CDP was 79.9% White, 11.2% African American, 0.2% Native American, 2.7% Asian, 0.05% Pacific Islander, 3.6% some other race, and 2.3% from two or more races. Hispanic or Latino of any race were 12.2% of the population. The CDP was 72.5% non-Hispanic White.

There were 14,537 households, out of which 36.7% had children under the age of 18 living with them, 54.3% were headed by married couples living together, 13.4% had a female householder with no husband present, and 27.3% were non-families. 22.0% of all households were made up of individuals, and 10.0% were someone living alone who was 65 years of age or older. The average household size was 2.93, and the average family size was 3.43.

In the CDP, the population was spread out, with 22.5% under the age of 18, 8.8% from 18 to 24, 26.7% from 25 to 44, 27.9% from 45 to 64, and 14.2% who were 65 years of age or older. The median age was 40.0 years.

=== 2009–2011 American Community Survey estimates ===
For the period 2009–2011, it was estimated that there were 14,322 housing units, of which 17.6% were in multi-unit structures. The homeownership rate was 78.7%. The median value of owner-occupied housing units was $353,500. 3.3% of housing units were vacant, and 21.3% of occupied housing units were occupied by renters.

94.6% of the population had lived in the same house 1 year & over. 12.9% of the entire population were foreign born, and 19.9% of residents at least 5 years old spoke a language other than English at home. 87.9% of residents at least 25 years old had graduated high school, and 20.5% of residents at least 25 years old had a bachelor's degree or higher.

The mean travel time to work for workers aged 16 and over was 28.8 minutes. The median income for a household in the CDP was $103,248. The per capita income for the CDP was $30,890. 4.0% of the population were living below the poverty line.

== Education ==
The West Babylon Union Free School District serves about half of the CDP of West Babylon and parts of Babylon Village and Wyandanch.

The Venetian Shores neighborhood of West Babylon is in the Lindenhurst Union Free School District. Since this area is also served by the Lindenhurst Post Office, it is commonly viewed as part of Lindenhurst.

The area around Sawyer Avenue Park is within the Babylon Union Free School District.

East of Belmont Avenue (from Sunrise Highway to Montgomery Avenue), north of Montgomery Avenue (from Belmont Avenue to Little East Neck Road), east of Little East Neck Road (from Montgomery Avenue to Straight Path), and southeast of an imaginary line that stretches from the Straight Path/Little East Neck Road intersection to the Wyandanch Avenue/Belmont avenue intersection, is within the North Babylon Union Free School District.

An area of Wyandanch that is served by the West Babylon Post Office is thought of as a part of West Babylon in the Wyandanch Union Free School District, and there is also a small portion of West Babylon served by the Wyandanch Union Free School District (around Cumberbach Street), but is also served by the Wyandanch post Office.

Main School, when it was built, was the only school in the town serving grades K-10 (older students were sent to Babylon High School). By the mid-1950s, the building had been expanded, becoming an elementary school. It was demolished in June 1982. Robert Moses participated in the cornerstone-laying ceremony of Santapogue Elementary School, in the fall of 1951. The school opened in September 1952, relieving the overcrowded situation at Main School.

As of the 2010-2011 school year, the West Babylon Union Free School District had 4,360 students. The racial demographics were 0% Native American or Alaska Native, 7% non-Hispanic black or African-American, 13% Hispanic or Latino, 76% non-Hispanic white, 4% Asian or Native Hawaiian/Other Pacific Islander and 0% multiracial. 17% of students were eligible for free lunch, 8% for reduced-price lunch, and 3% of students were Limited English Proficient. 11.8% of students were classified as "Special Ed".

The school district had a graduation rate of 90%, and 1% of students did not complete school. 93% of graduates received a Regents Diploma and 50% received a Regents Diploma with Advanced Designation. Of the 2011 completers, 47% planned to move on to 4-year College, 39% to 2-year College, 1% to Other Post-Secondary, 2% to the Military, 8% to Employment, 0% to Adult Services, 1% had other known post-secondary plans, and 2% had no known post-secondary plan.

The district currently has:

- Four elementary schools (grades K-5): John F. Kennedy, Santapogue, South Bay, and Tooker Avenue
- One middle school (grades 6-8): West Babylon Junior High School
- One high school (Grades 9-12): West Babylon High School

The district previously had:

- One additional elementary school (grades K-5): Forest Avenue (Leased to Western Suffolk BOCES for educational use in 2025)

For the 2011-2012 school year, the Accountability Status for all seven schools in the district and the district as a whole was "In Good Standing".

== Notable people ==
- Jovan Belcher, former linebacker for the Kansas City Chiefs
- Dan Deacon, electronic musician
- Harold Dieterle, winner of Bravo's Top Chef (Season 1)
- Owen H. Johnson, former member of the New York State Senate
- Billy Koch, former Major League Baseball pitcher for the Toronto Blue Jays among other teams
- Geraldo Rivera, Fox News reporter and host of Geraldo at Large; graduated from West Babylon High School in 1961
- Kevin Russo, former player for the New York Yankees

== In popular culture ==
West Babylon is referenced in the book Along Came a Spider by James Patterson in chapter 39 while discussing the hometown of the antagonist's step-mother.

== See also ==
- Babylon (village), New York
- North Babylon, New York
