= Aaron Dashiell =

American football player

Profile
- Position: Defensive back

Career information
- College: Maine (1998–1999)

Awards and highlights
- Division I-AA All-American

Aaron Dashiell is an American former football defensive back.

== Career ==
Dashiell attended the University of Maine, where he played with the Maine Black Bears football team. He was named to the Division I-AA All American twice (1998–99), becoming at the time just Maine's second multiple time All American after John Huard. Stephen Cooper and Jovan Belcher have done it since.

During his junior season, Dashiell had 100 tackles and 6 interceptions. He is from Plainfield, New Jersey.

Dashiell got inducted into the University of Maine Sports Hall of Fame in 2021.

== Personal life ==
He lives in Worcester, Massachusetts with his wife, Joanne, and their sons Theo and Myles.
