= Michael Shiell =

Michael Shiell OFM, Guardian of Killeigh, fl. 1693–98.

Shiell was a member of the Ó Siadhail family of Kingdom of Uí Failghe, who were prominent County Offaly and County Laois in the late medieval/early modern era. Shiell was a member of the Franciscan order, and became the guardian of the Franciscan friary at Killeigh, County Offaly, in 1693. In 1698, eight individuals signed a document acknowledging that they had received chalices, pyxes, cups, an oil box, ciborium, a bell and vestments of the friary for safekeeping. Michael Shiell was one of the eight signatories, as was one William Shiell, who received at least three of the items. Krasnodebska-D'Aughton states that "both were probably members of the Ó Siadhail family, who had long associations with the Franciscans in the midlands."

== See also ==
- Mícheál Ó Cléirigh
- Feardorcha Ó Mealláin
- Aodh Mac Cathmhaoil
