= Micheal O'Siadhail =

Irish poet (born 1947)

- Mícheál Ó Siadhail
- Born: January 12, 1947 (age 79); Dublin, Ireland
- Education: Trinity College Dublin
- Occupation: Poet
- Spouse(s): Bríd Ní Chearbhaill (m. 1969-2013); Christina Weltz

Micheal O'Siadhail (Irish: Mícheál Ó Siadhail [ˈmʲiːçaːl̪ˠ oː ˈʃiəlʲ]; born 12 January 1947) is an Irish poet. He studied at Trinity College, Dublin (TCD) and the University of Oslo. He has been a lecturer at TCD, a professor at the Dublin Institute for Advanced Studies, and has been a full-time writer since 1987. He has received several awards, including the Irish American Culture Institute Prize for Poetry in 1982, the Marten Toonder Prize for Literature in 1998, and the Eric Hoffer Book Award in 2020.

== Early life ==
Micheal O'Siadhail was born into a middle-class family in Dublin. His father, a chartered accountant, was from County Monaghan, and his mother was from Dublin, with roots in County Tipperary.

At age twelve, O'Siadhail attended the Jesuit boarding school Clongowes Wood College, an experience he later described in his poetry. At age thirteen, he visited the Aran Islands, an experience he stated had a significant impact on him.

== Career ==
Micheal O'Siadhail studied at Trinity College Dublin from 1964 to 1984, where his teachers included notable authors David H. Greene and Máirtín Ó Cadhain. There he was elected a Scholar of the College and received a First Class Honours degree. His circle at Trinity included David McConnell, Mary Robinson, and David F. Ford. O'Siadhail then received a government exchange scholarship, going on to study folklore and Icelandic at the University of Oslo. He considers Scandinavian literature a major influence on his work.

O'Siadhail worked in academia for seventeen years, first as a lecturer at Trinity College Dublin (1969–1973), where he was awarded an MLitt in 1971, and then as a research professor at the Dublin Institute for Advanced Studies. During these years, he gave named lectures in Dublin, as well as at Harvard University and Yale University. As an academic, O'Siadhail published his works on the linguistics of Irish and a textbook for learners of Irish. He was a visiting professor at the University of Iceland from 1982 until 1987 when he resigned from his professorship to write poetry.

He was a member of the Arts Council of the Republic of Ireland (1987–1993) and a member of the Advisory Committee on Cultural Relations (1989–1997). He was an editor of the Poetry Ireland Review and the founding chairman of ILE (Ireland Literature Exchange). A founding member of Aosdána (Academy of Distinguished Irish Artists), O'Siadhail has worked with composer Seóirse Bodley and painters Cecil King and Mick O'Dea. In 2008, he gave a reading as part of a celebration for Brian Friel's 80th birthday.

He represented Ireland at the Poetry Society's European Poetry Festival in London in 1981 and the Frankfurt Book Fair in 1997. He was a Writer in Residence at the Yeats Summer School in 1991 and at the University of British Columbia in 2002.

== Poetic Development ==
O'Siadhail's poetic works can be organized into two main periods: his "apprenticeship" (from 1980-1985, during which his first five volumes appeared), followed by his mature period, which occurs after his 1987 decision to resign his professorship and devote his energies to poetry full-time.

=== Apprenticeship ===
O'Siadhail's first three collections were written in Irish: An Bhlian Bhisigh [The Leap Year] (1978); Runga [Rungs of Time] (1980) and Cumann [Belonging] (1982). These collections explore themes that recur in his later work. In Belonging, human relationships emerge as a major theme.

His next two collections, Springnight (1983) and The Image Wheel (1985), were English-language works. They introduced poems that became well-known before he began a series of books based on broad themes.

=== Maturity ===
O'Siadhail described his third collection in English, 1990's The Chosen Garden, as "an effort to face my own journey, to comprehend and trace one's own tiny epic." The ten poems collected in The Chosen Garden recount, from his early-middle-aged perspective, the poet's early life and development, particularly his experiences at Clongowes. While he included sonnets in Springnight and The Image Wheel, in The Chosen Garden O'Siadhail composes sonnet sequences, shifting between Shakepearean and Italian forms, heightening each sequence's "shift in argument."

In 1992, Hail! Madam Jazz: New and Selected Poems appeared, which includes the sequence "The Middle Voice." Named the best poetry collection of 1992 by the Dublin Sunday Tribune, it was the first of his collections to be published in North America. A Fragile City, a meditation in four parts on the theme of trust, was published in 1995. His 1998 Our Double Time addresses themes related to human finitude. The Times Literary Supplement praised the collection's "fine poems about music." In 2002, he published The Gossamer Wall, which was shortlisted for the 2003 Jewish Quarterly-Wingate Literary Prize's fiction category. In 2005, he published Love Life, followed by Globe in 2007. O'Siadhail's poetry often explores themes of love, loss, and the human condition, and features engagement with cultural and historical subjects.

== Personal life ==
In 1970, he married Bríd Ní Chearbhaill, who was born in Gweedore in County Donegal and worked as a teacher. They were married for 44 years until Ní Chearbhaill died in 2013. After her death, O’Siadhail moved to New York. He is now married to Christina Weltz, an assistant professor of surgical oncology at Mount Sinai Hospital.

== Bibliography ==
=== Books ===
Poetry

- 1978: An Bhliain Bhisigh [The Leap Year] (An Clóchomar, Dublin)
- 1980: Runga [Rungs of Time] (An Clóchomhar, Dublin)
- 1982: Cumann [Belonging] (An Clóchomhar, Dublin)
- 1985: Springnight (Bluett, Dublin)
- 1990: The Image Wheel (Bluett, Dublin)
- 1990: The Chosen Garden (Dedalus, Dublin)
- 1992: Hail! Madam Jazz: New and Selected Poems including The Middle Voice (Bloodaxe, Newcastle upon Tyne)
- 1995: A Fragile City (Bloodaxe, Newcastle upon Tyne)
- 1998: Our Double Time (Bloodaxe, Newcastle upon Tyne)
- 1999: Poems 1975–1995 (Bloodaxe, Newcastle upon Tyne)
- 2002: The Gossamer Wall (Time Being Books, St. Louis, MO; Bloodaxe, Tarset)
- 2005: Love Life (Bloodaxe, Tarset)
- 2007: Globe (Bloodaxe, Tarset)
- 2010: Tongues (Bloodaxe, Tarset)
- 2014: Collected Poems (Bloodaxe, Tarset)
- 2015: One Crimson Thread (Bloodaxe, Tarset; Baylor University Press, Waco, TX)
- 2018: The Five Quintets (Baylor University Press, Waco, TX)
- 2022: Testament (Baylor University Press, Waco, TX)
- 2023: Desire (Baylor University Press, Waco, TX)

Linguistics and language pedagogy
- 1978: Téarmaí tógálá agus tís as Inis Meáin (Dublín Institute for Advanced Studies
- 1983: (with Arndt Wigger) Córas Fuaimeanna na Gaeilge (Dublin Institute for Advanced Studies)
- 1988: Learning Irish (Yale University Press)
- 1989: Modern Irish: Grammatical Structure and Dialectal Variation (Cambridge University Press)

=== Limited editions ===
- 1989 Four Poems (with artist Cecil King) Editions Monica Beck

=== About O'Siadhail and his work ===
- 2007: The Musics of Belonging: The Poetry of Micheal O'Siadhail Ed. Marc Caball and David F. Ford, Carysfort Press, Dublin
- 2008: A Hazardous Melody of Being: Seóirse Bodley's Song Cycles on the Poems of Micheal O'Siadhail Edited by Lorraine Byrne Bodley, Carysfort Press, Dublin
- 2009: An Unexpected Light: Theology and Witness in the Poetry and Though of Charles Williams, Micheal O'Siadhail and Geoffrey Hill, David C. Mahan, Pickwick Publications Eugene

=== Works set to music ===
- 1987: The Naked Flame, poem suite (music: Seóirse Bodley) RTÉ commissioned for performance and broadcasting
- 1993: Summerfest poem suite (Music: Colman Pearce) RTÉ commissioned for performance and broadcasting
- 2000: Earlsfort Suite song cycle (Music: Seóirse Bodley) commissioned for Irish Government Department of Arts, the Gaeltacht, Heritage and the Islands as part of the Millennium Frozen Music celebration
- 2000: A Fall set by Dan Tucker, commissioned by the Chicago Humanities Festival.
- 2002: Dublín Spring, poem suite (music: James Wilson) commissioned for performance.
- 2006: Twee gedichten van Micheal O'Siadhail for Choir 2006 by Kees van Ersel
- 2007: Squall set by Seóirse Bodley

== Discography ==
- The Naked Flame, poem suite (music: Seóirse Bodley) recorded by Aylish E. Kerrigan accompanied on piano by the composer Seóirse Bodley and available from Ein Klang, Christophestraße, Stuttgart 70178
- Cosmos from Hail! Madam Jazz recorded by Helen Shapiro on Jazz Poetry ABM
