= List of shopping streets and districts by city =

A shopping street or shopping district is a designated road or quarter of a municipality that is composed of retail establishments (such as stores, boutiques, restaurants, and shopping complexes). Such areas may be pedestrian-oriented, with street-side buildings and wide sidewalks. They may be located along a designated street, or clustered in mixed-use commercial area.

In larger cities, there may be multiple shopping streets or districts, often with distinct characteristics each. Businesses in these areas may be represented by a designated business improvement association.

Examples of shopping streets and districts, organized by location, include:

== Africa ==
=== Cameroon ===
- Yaounde — Avenue Kennedy
- Douala — Avenue Ahmadou Ahidjo, Boulevard de la liberté

=== Egypt ===
- Cairo — Khan el-Khalili, Al-Hussein Area
- Alexandria — Manshiya, Berkleley
- Sharm El-Sheikh — Naama Bay, Shark's Bay

=== Ghana ===
- Accra — Oxford Street

=== Morocco ===
- Casablanca — Place des shopping places

=== South Africa ===
- Johannesburg — Rosebank, Sandton
- Cape Town — Cape Gate, Long Street, Tyger Valley

=== Tunisia ===
- Tunis — Berges du Lac

== Asia ==
=== Armenia ===
- Yerevan — Northern Avenue

=== Azerbaijan ===
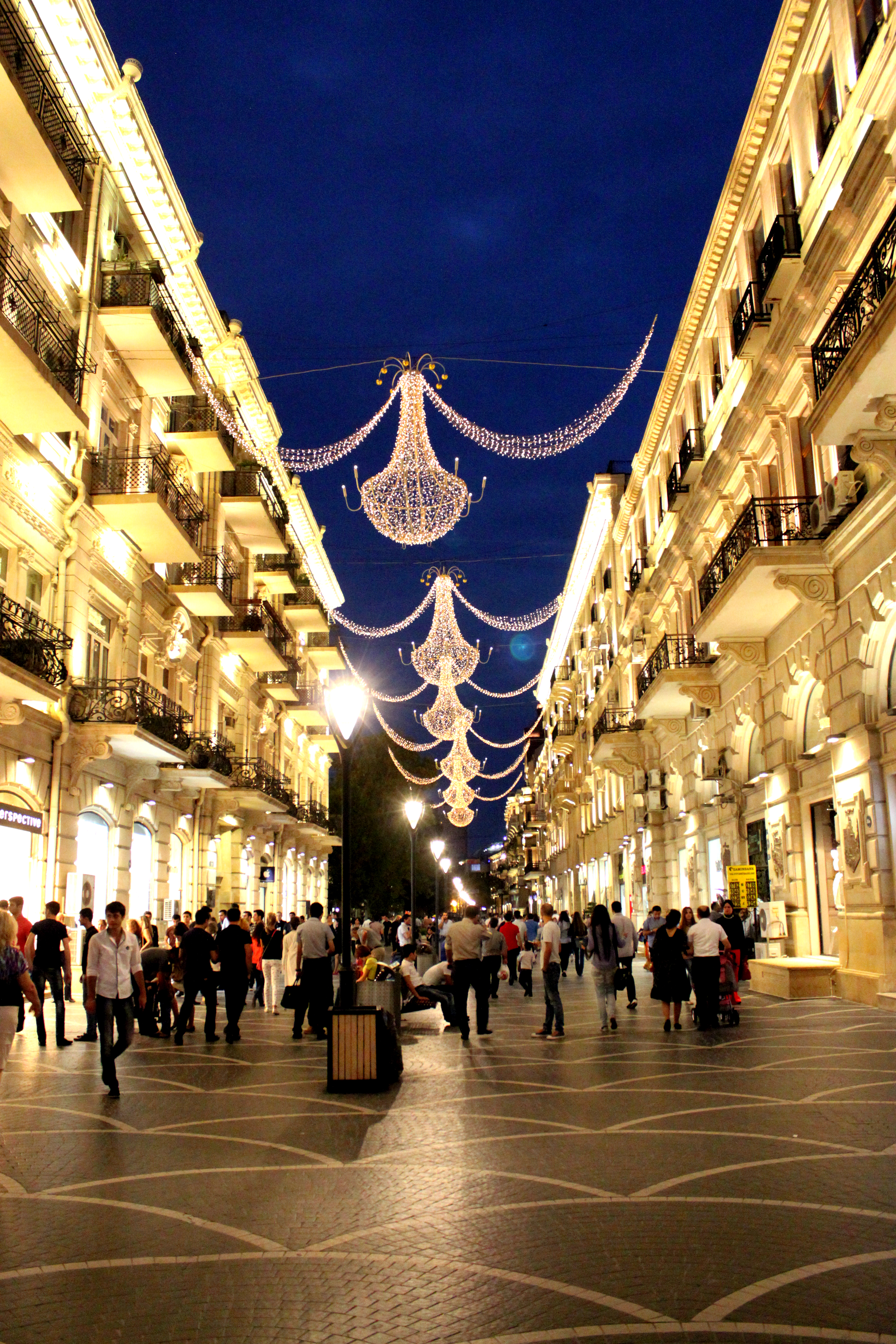
Nizami Street, Baku, Azerbaijan

- Baku — Neftchilar Avenue, Nizami Street
- Ganja — Javad Khan Street

=== Bangladesh ===
- Dhaka — Gulshan

=== Georgia ===
- Tbilisi — Rustaveli Avenue

=== China ===
- Beijing — Wangfujing, Xidan, Guomao, Zhongguancun, Sanlitun, Silk Street
- Chongqing — Ciqikou, Guanyinqiao, Jiefangbei, Nanping, Shapingba
- Shanghai — Nanjing Road, Avenue Joffre, People's Square, Zikawei, Lujiazui, The Bund, Wujiaochang, Avenue Petain, Hongqiao, Xintiandi, Tianzifang, Zhujiajiao, Qibao, Xinzhuang, North Sichuan Road

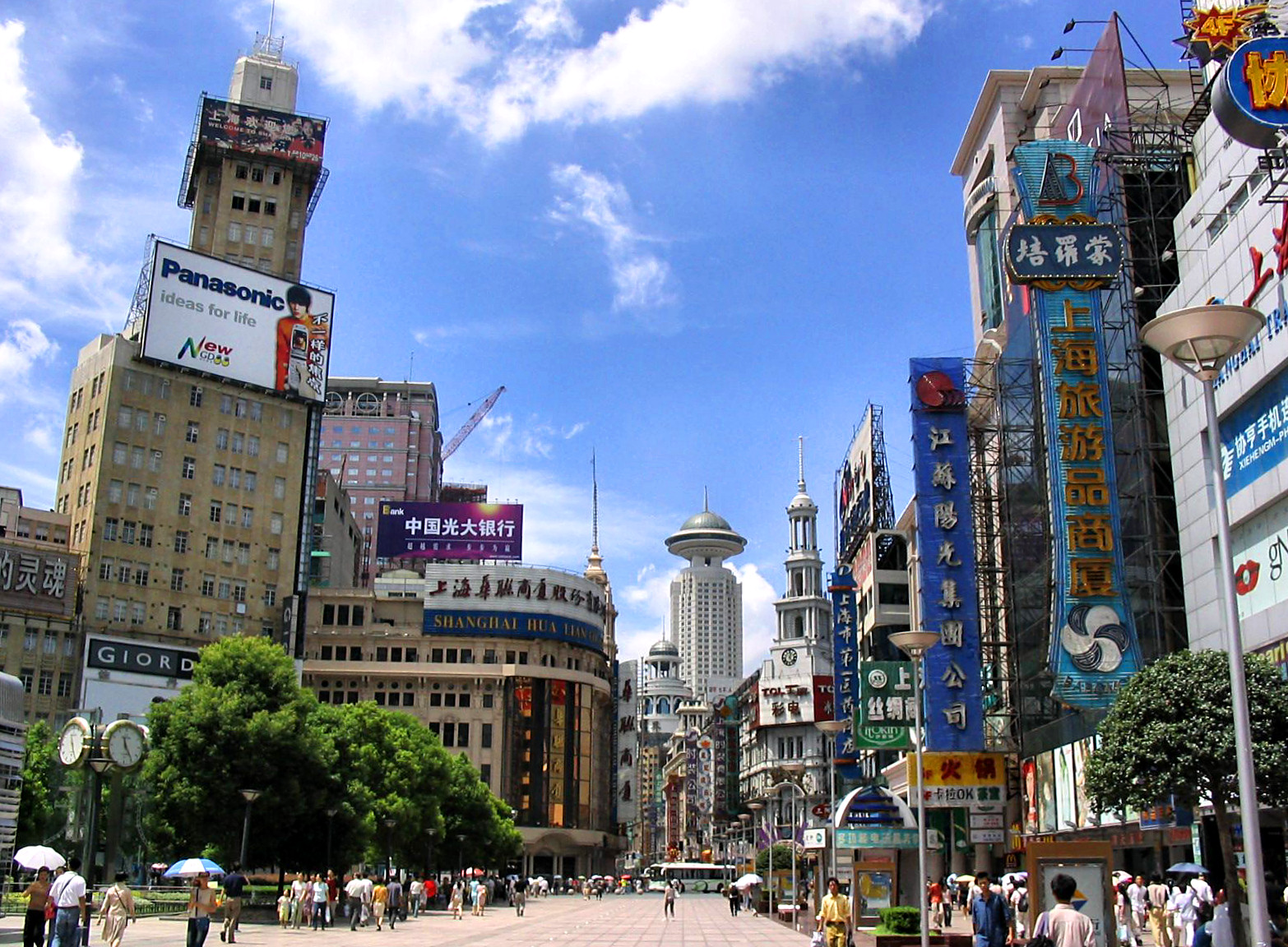
Nanjing Road, Shanghai

Fujian

- Xiamen — Zhongshan Road, Xiahe Road, Gulangyu Island

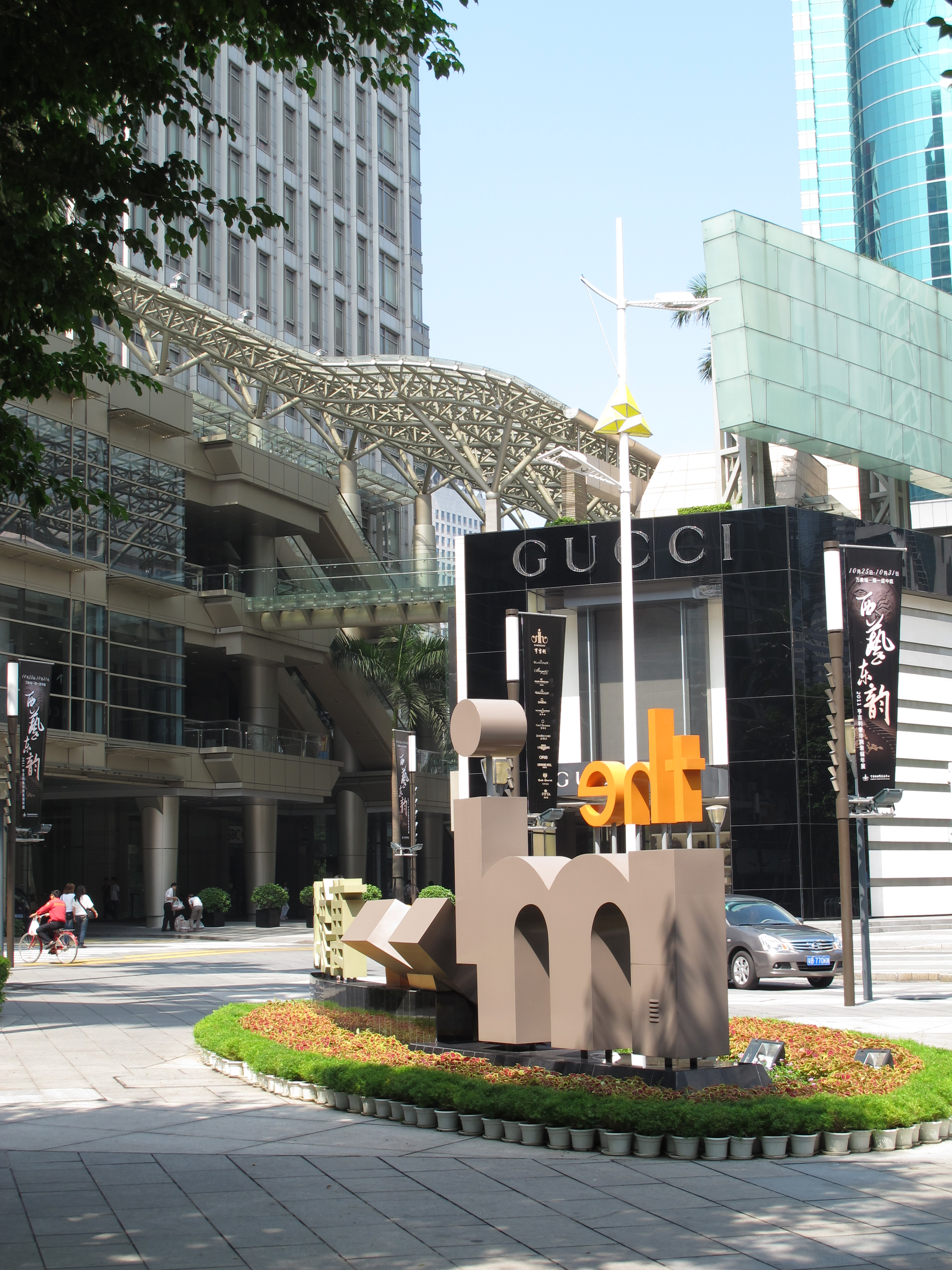
The MixC in Shenzhen

Guangdong

- Guangzhou — Shangxiajiu Pedestrian Street
- Shenzhen — Shennan Road, The MixC

Hong Kong

- Causeway Bay — Russell Street
- Central — Chater Road
- Tsim Sha Tsui — Canton Road

Jiangsu

- Nanjing — Xinjiekou, Daxinggong, Confucius Temple, Baijiahu, Yuantong, Qiaobei, Maqun, Sanshan Street, Jiqingmen
- Suzhou — Ligongdi, Lake Jinji, Shiquan Street, Canglang, Pingjiang Road

Liaoning

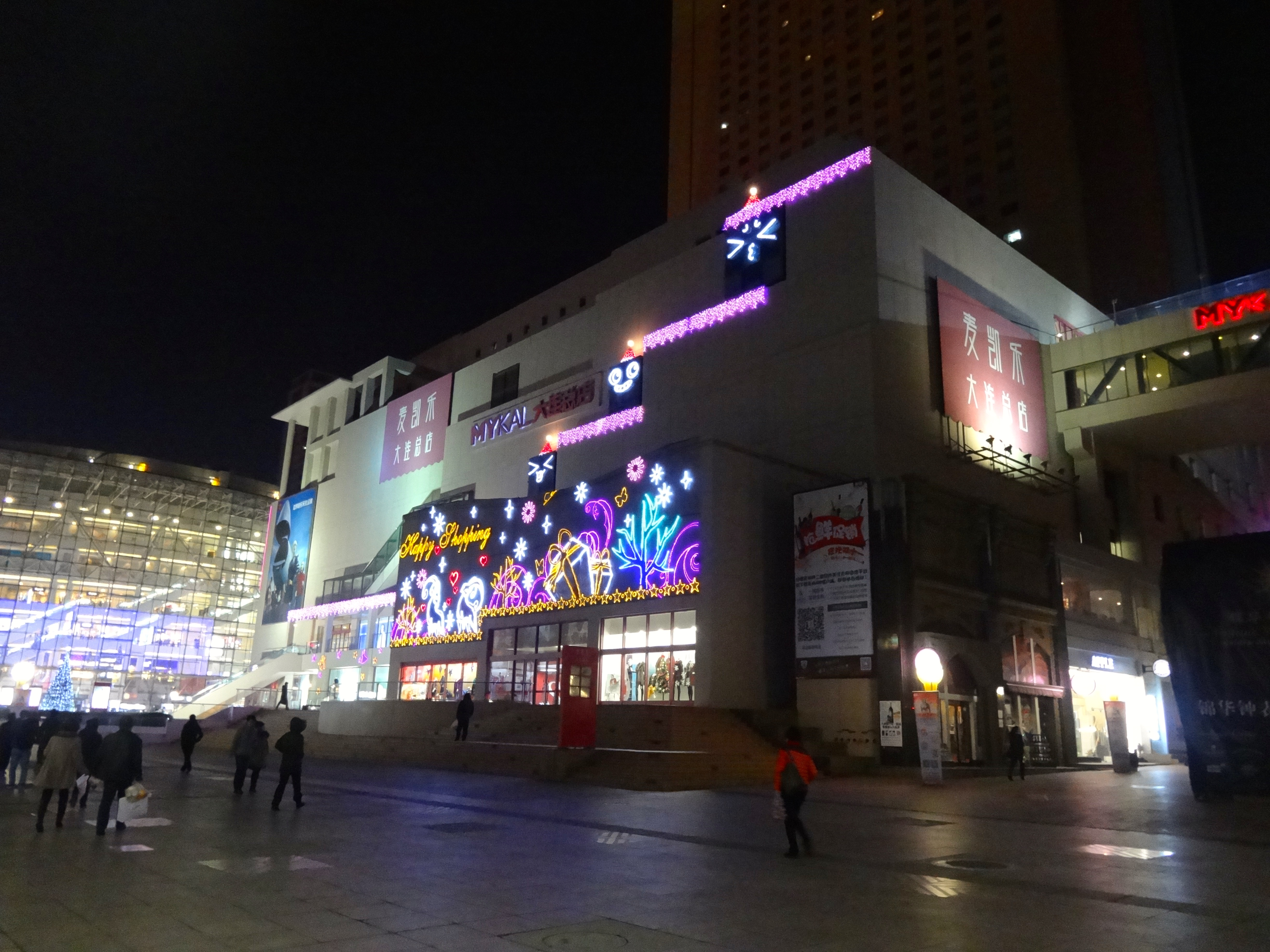
Qingniwaqiao in Dalian, Liaoning Province, China

- Dalian — Qingniwaqiao, Xi'an Road, Heping Square

Shaanxi

- Xi'an — Eastern Street

Shandong

- Qingdao — Taidong

Sichuan

- Chengdu — Chunxilu, Hongxinglu (close to Chunxilu)

Zhejiang

- Hangzhou — Wulin Square, Euro Street, Hubin Road, The MixC
- Ningbo — Tianyi Square

=== India ===
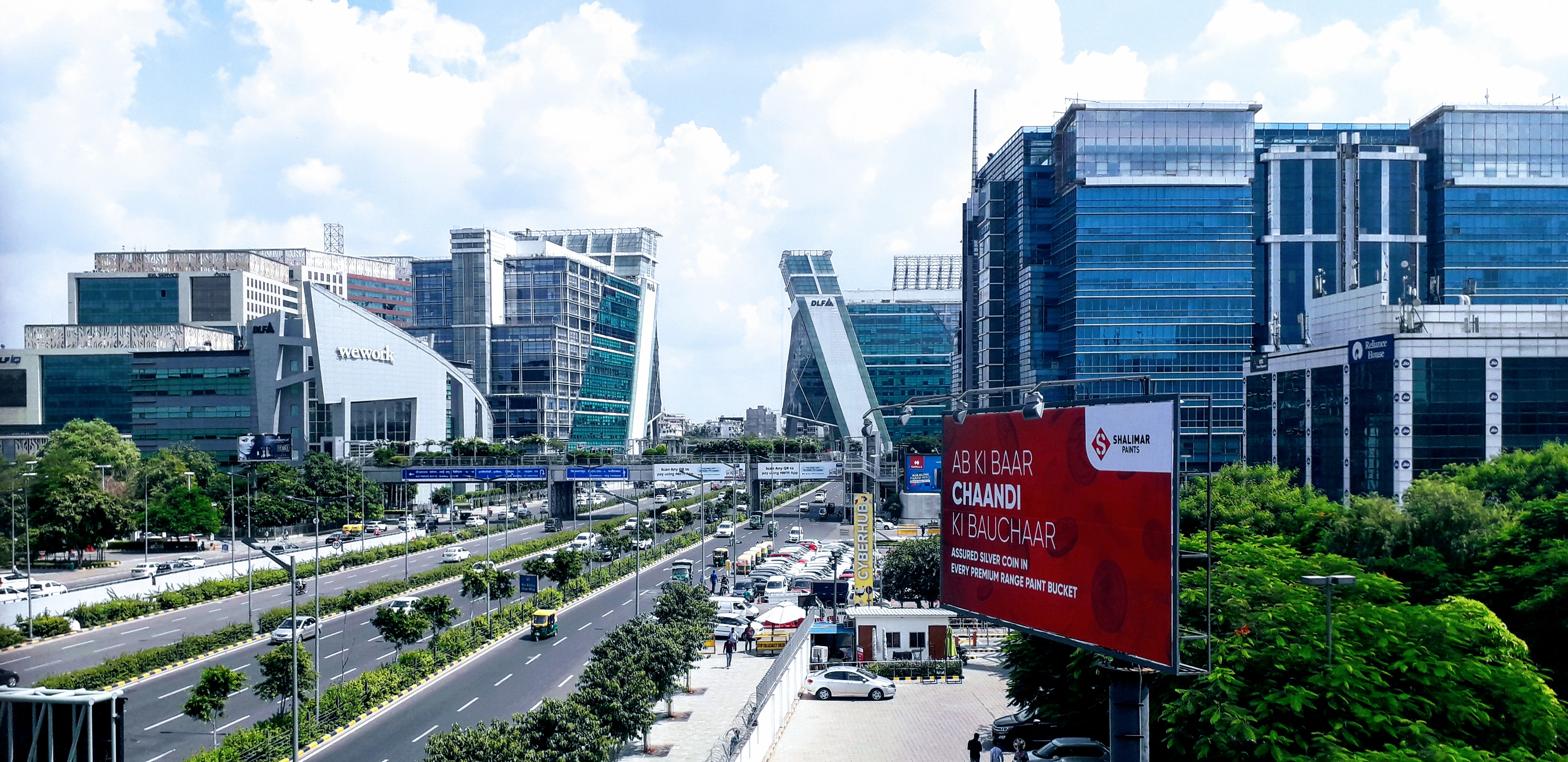
Cyber City, Gurgaon

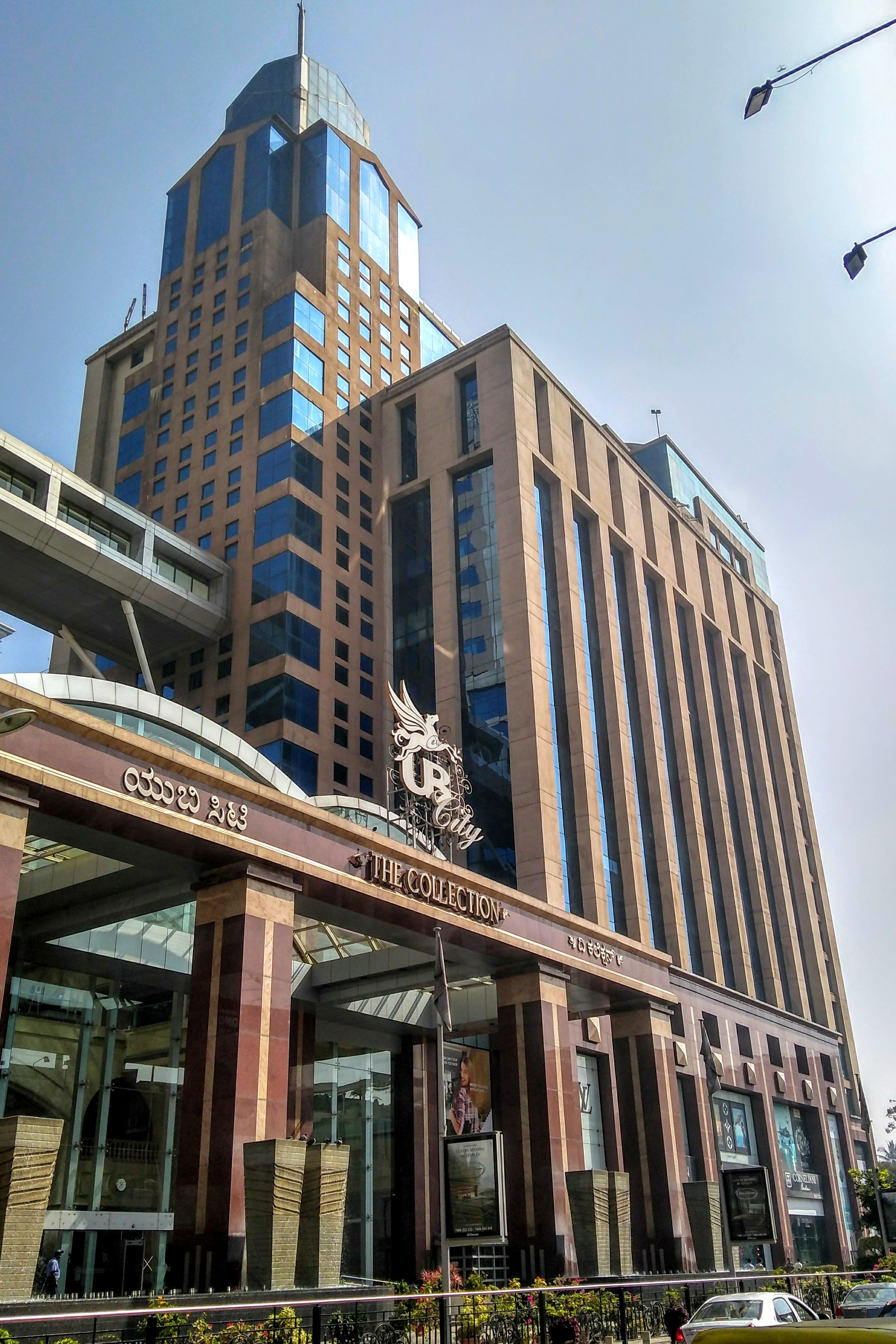
UB City, Bangalore

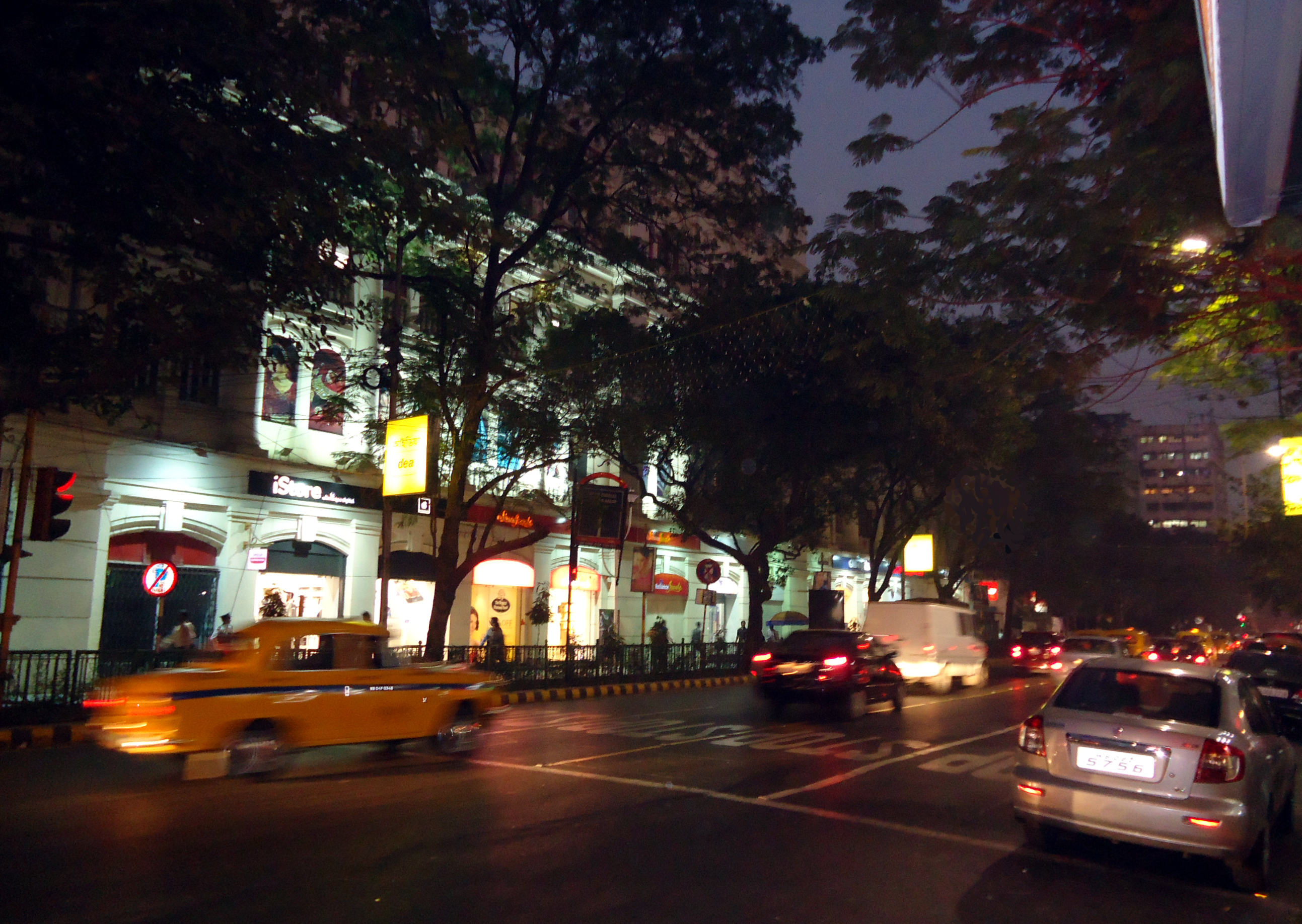
Park Street, Kolkata

- Chandigarh — Sector 17
- Delhi — Aerocity, Connaught Place, Khan Market, Nehru Place, Select City Walk, South Extension

Andhra Pradesh

- Guntur — Brindavan Gardens, Brodipet, Chandramoulinagar, Lakshmipuram
- Nellore — Kapu Street
- Vijayawada — Eluru Road, Mahatma Gandhi Road (aka Bandar Road), PVP Square, Trendset Mall
- Visakhapatnam — Daba Gardens, Dwaraka Nagar, Jagadamba Centre, Town Kotha Road, VIP Road, Waltair Main Road

Gujarat

- Ahmedabad — C. G. Road, S.G. Highway, Ashram Road

Haryana

- Gurgaon — DLF CyberCity, Mehrauli Gurgaon Road

Karnataka

- Bangalore — 100 Feet Road, Brigade Road, Chinmaya Mission Hospital Road, Commercial Street, Jayanagar 4th Block Shopping Complex, Mahatma Gandhi Road, UB City

Kerala

- Thiruvananthapuram — Chala, Connemara Market, East Fort, Keston Road, Kowdiar, Mahatma Gandhi Road, Pettah, Thampanoor
- Kochi — Mahatma Gandhi Road
- Kozhikode — Court Road, Mavoor Road, Palayam, Sweetmeat Street

Madhya Pradesh

- Gwalior — Maharaj Bada, Naya Bazaar

Maharashtra

- Buldhana — Kavri Chowk
- Mumbai — Bhendi Bazaar, Chira Bazaar, Chor Bazaar, Colaba + Colaba Causeway, Crawford Market, Dadar, Dava Bazaar, Dharavi, Fashion Street, Fort, Hindmata, Hiranandani Gardens, Kemps Corner, Lalbaug, Lamington Road, Linking Road, Lohar Chawl, Lower Parel, Mahim, Mangaldas Market, Matunga, Natraj Market, New Marine Drive, Null Bazaar, Princess Street, Sion (Gandhi Market), Tardeo, Walkeshwar, Zaveri Bazaar
  - Navi Mumbai — Nerul, Sanpada, Vashi
- Pune — Appa Balwant Chowk (aka ABC), Mahatma Phule Mandai, MG Road, Tulshibaug

Punjab

- Amritsar — Lawrence Road
- Ludhiana — Mall Road

Rajasthan

- Jaipur — Badi Chaupar, Chandpol, Chhoti Chaupar, Bapu Bazaar, Johari Bazaar,

Tamil Nadu

- Chennai — Pondy Bazaar, Grand Southern Trunk Road, Khader Nawaz Khan Road, Nelson Manickam Road, Ranganathan Street, South Usman Road, Usman Road
- Coimbatore — Avinashi Road, Diwan Bahadur Road, Race Course, R.S. Puram

Telangana

- Hyderabad — Abids, Banjara Hills, Koti

Uttarakhand

- Dehradun — Rajpur Road

Uttar Pradesh

- Allahabad — Civil lines
- Lucknow — Gomtinagar, Hazratganj
- Varanasi — Maldahiya

West Bengal

- Kolkata — Camac Street, Esplanade, Gariahat, New Market, Park Street

=== Indonesia ===
- Bandung — Jalan Cihampelas, Jalan Riau, Jalan Braga
- Jakarta — Tanah Abang, Pasar Baru, Grogol Petamburan, Jalan M.H. Thamrin, Sudirman Central Business District, Satrio Shopping Belt
- Medan — Kampung Madras, Kesawan
- Surabaya — Tunjungan Street
- Yogyakarta — Malioboro

=== Iraq ===
- Baghdad — Abu Nuwas Street, al-Mutanabbi Street, al-Rasheed Street, al-Sa'doun Street, 14th of Ramadan Street

=== Iran ===
- Ahvaz — Kian Pars
- Isfahan — Tohid Street
- Kerman — 1001 Shab Street, Emam Hossein Boulevard
- Mashhad — Ahmad Abad Avenue, Sajad Boulevard
- Sari — Saat Square, Enghelab Street, Qaran Street, Tabarsi Street, Farhang Avenue
- Tehran — Valiasr Street, Jomjuri-e Eslami Street, Gandi Street, Mirdamad Boulevard, Maadar Square, Vanak Square, Pasdaran

=== Israel ===
- Jerusalem — Downtown Triangle (Jaffa Road, King George Street, Ben Yehuda Street), Emek Refaim, Malha, Mamilla Mall, Talpiot

=== Japan ===
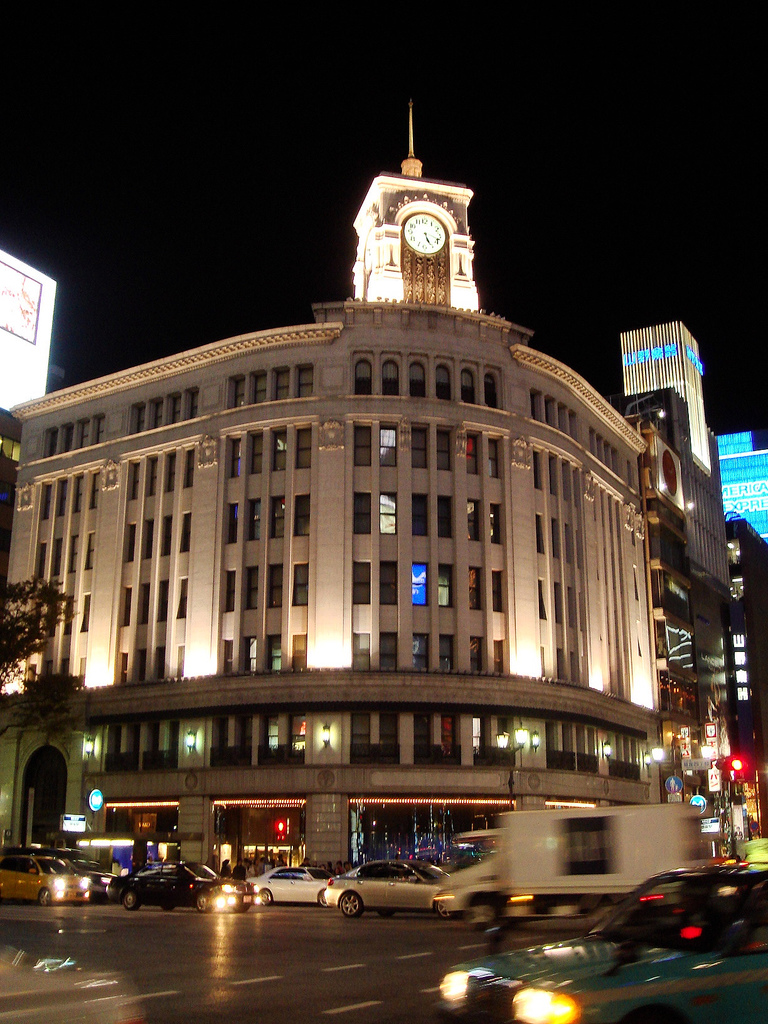
Ginza in Tokyo

- Fukuoka — Nakasu, Tenjin
- Hiroshima — Kamiyachō, Hacchōbori, Hondori Street
- Kawasaki — Kawasaki-ku
- Kobe — Harborland, Nankinmachi (Kobe Chinatown), Motomachi, Sannomiya
- Kyoto — Shijō Street (Gion, Shijō Kawaramachi, Shijō Karasuma), Pontochō, Shin-Kyōgoku Street
- Nagoya — Meieki (district around Nagoya Station), Sakae, Kanayama
- Osaka — Midōsuji, Minami area (America-mura, Dōtonbori, Horie, Namba, Nipponbashi, Shinsaibashi, and Sennichimae), Tennōji, Umeda
- Saitama — Ōmiya, Urawa
- Sapporo — Odori Park, Tanuki Kōji
- Sendai — Ichibanchō, Chuō Street
- Tokyo — Aoyama, Asakusa, Daikanyama, Ebisu, Ginza, Harajuku, Ikebukuro, Jiyugaoka, Nihonbashi, Omotesandō, Roppongi, Shibuya, Shimokitazawa, Shinjuku, Yūrakuchō
  - Western Tokyo — Kichijōji, Machida, Tachikawa, Hachiōji
- Yokohama — Minato Mirai 21, Motomachi, Yokohama Chinatown

=== Kuwait ===
- Kuwait City — Salmiya - Salem Al-Mubarak Street

=== Lebanon ===
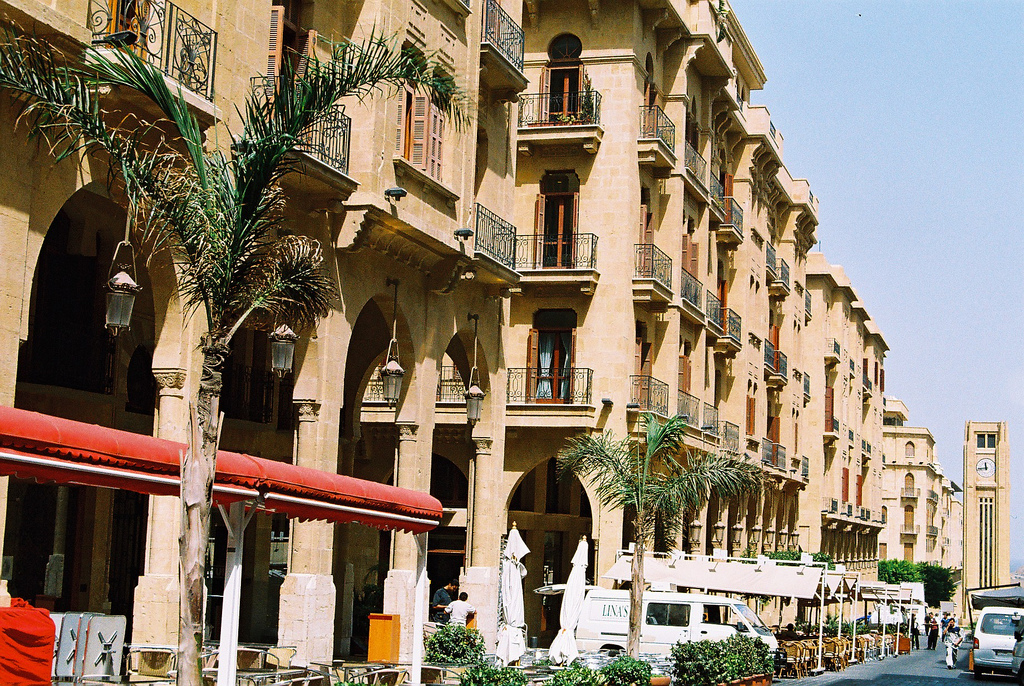
Maarad street, Beirut

- Beirut — Beirut Central District, Hamra Street, Rue Verdun, Achrafieh, Dbayeh, Beirut Souks
- Jounieh — Kaslik
- Tripoli — Rue El Mina
- Zahlé — Central Boulevard

=== Malaysia ===
- Kuala Lumpur — Bukit Bintang, Bangsar, Petaling Street (China Town), Brickfields (Little India), Jalan Masjid India, Jalan Tuanku Abdul Rahman (Batu Road), Chow Kit Road
- Malacca — Jalan Merdeka
- Penang — King Street, Queen Street, Market Street (Little India), Burma Road, Gurney Drive
- Selangor — Mutiara Damansara

=== Nepal ===
- Chitwan — Narayangarh
- Kathmandu — Durbar Marg, New Road, Sundhara
- Lalitpur — Kumaripati
- Pokhara — Chipledhunga, Lakeside

=== Pakistan ===
- Faisalabad — D Ground, Susan Road
- Islamabad — F-6 Markaz, Blue Area, F 10 Markaz, The Centaurus
- Karachi — Zamzama Boulevard, Tariq Road, Zaibunissa Street, Hyderi
- Lahore — M.M. Alam Road, Mall Road, Main Boulevard
- Rawalpindi — Commercial Market, Murree Road, Centrum Plaza

=== Philippines ===
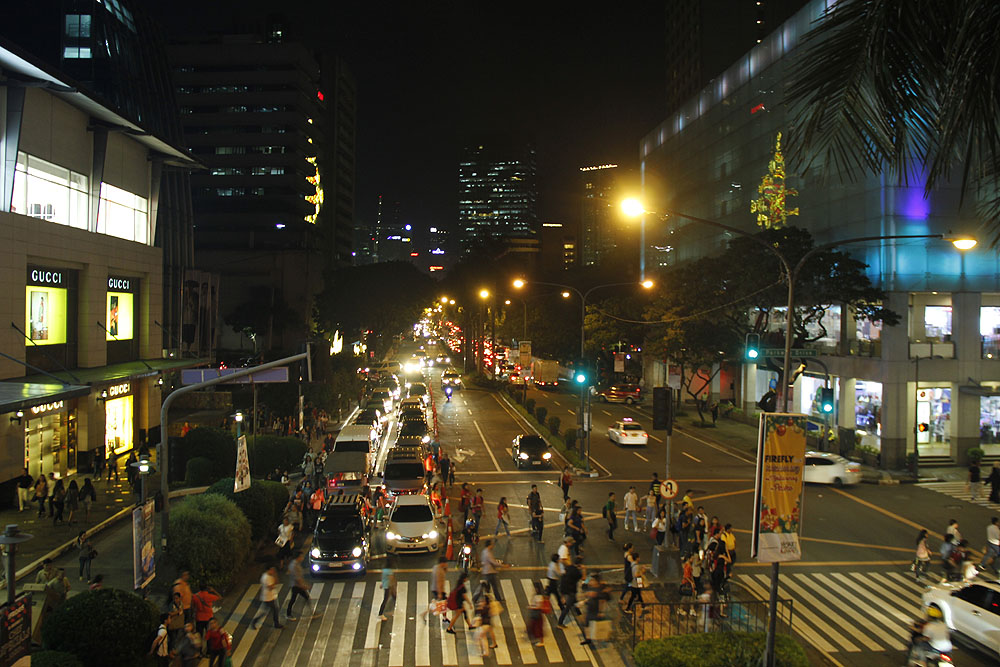
Ayala Center, Makati

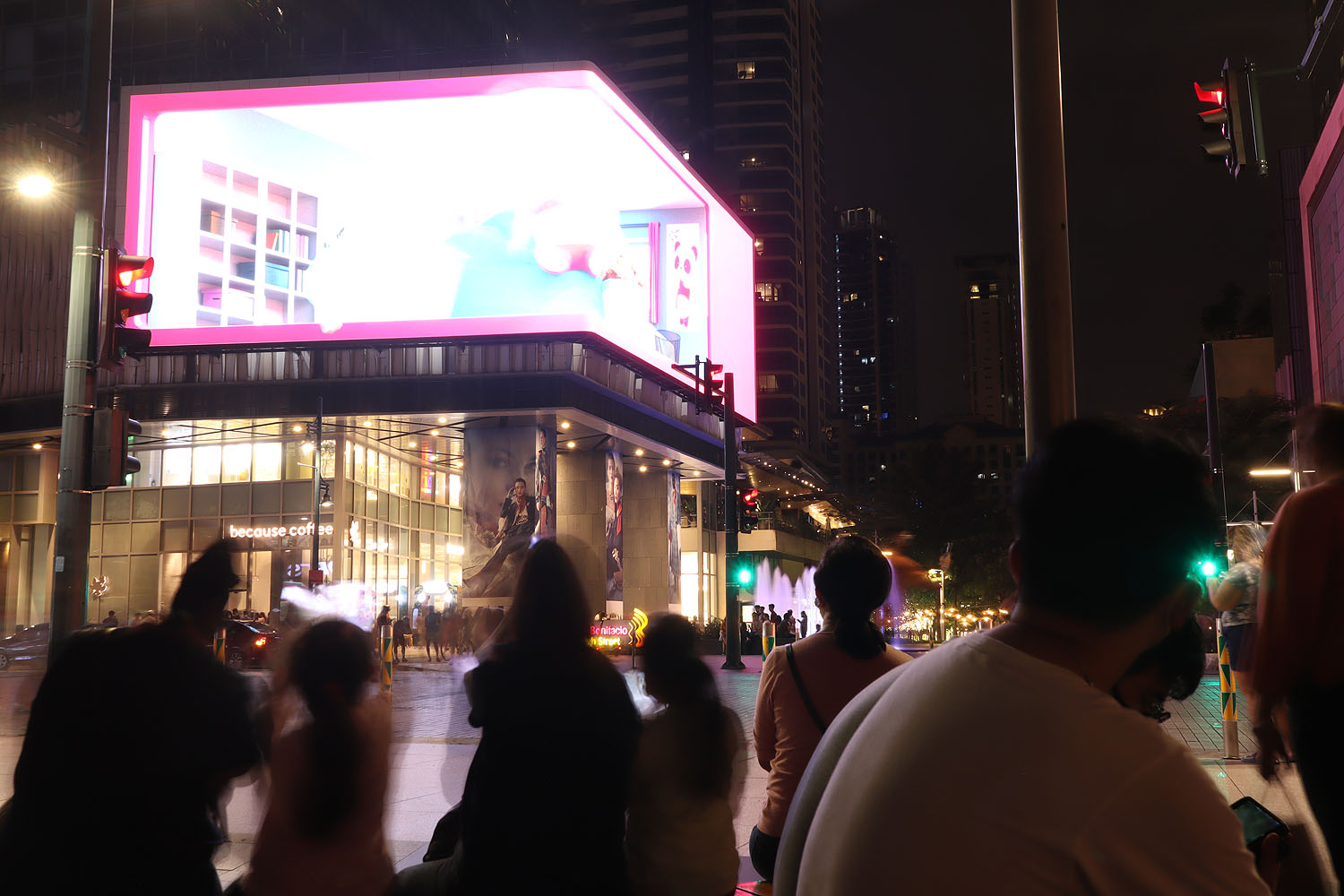
Bonifacio High Street, in Taguig

Metro Manila

- Manila - Divisoria, Quiapo, Binondo, Escolta Street
- Makati - Ayala Center, Poblacion
- Parañaque - Baclaran
- Pasig - Kapitolyo, Tiendesitas
- Quezon City - Araneta Center, Maginhawa Street, Tomas Morato Avenue, Triangle Park
- San Juan - Greenhills
- Taguig - Bonifacio High Street

Cordillera

- Baguio - Session Road

Visayas

- Cebu City - Cebu Business Park, Colon Street
- Iloilo City - Calle Real, Festive Walk

Davao

- Davao City - J.P. Laurel Avenue

=== Saudi Arabia ===
- Jeddah — Tahlia Street, Prince Sultan Street, Palestine Street (Telecommunications), Al-Balad
- Riyadh — Tahlia Street, Olaya Street

=== Singapore ===
- Singapore — Orchard Road, Bras Basah Road, Eu Tong Sen Street, Hill Street, Victoria Street, North Bridge Road-South Bridge Road
- Bugis — Bugis Junction, Bugis+

=== South Korea ===
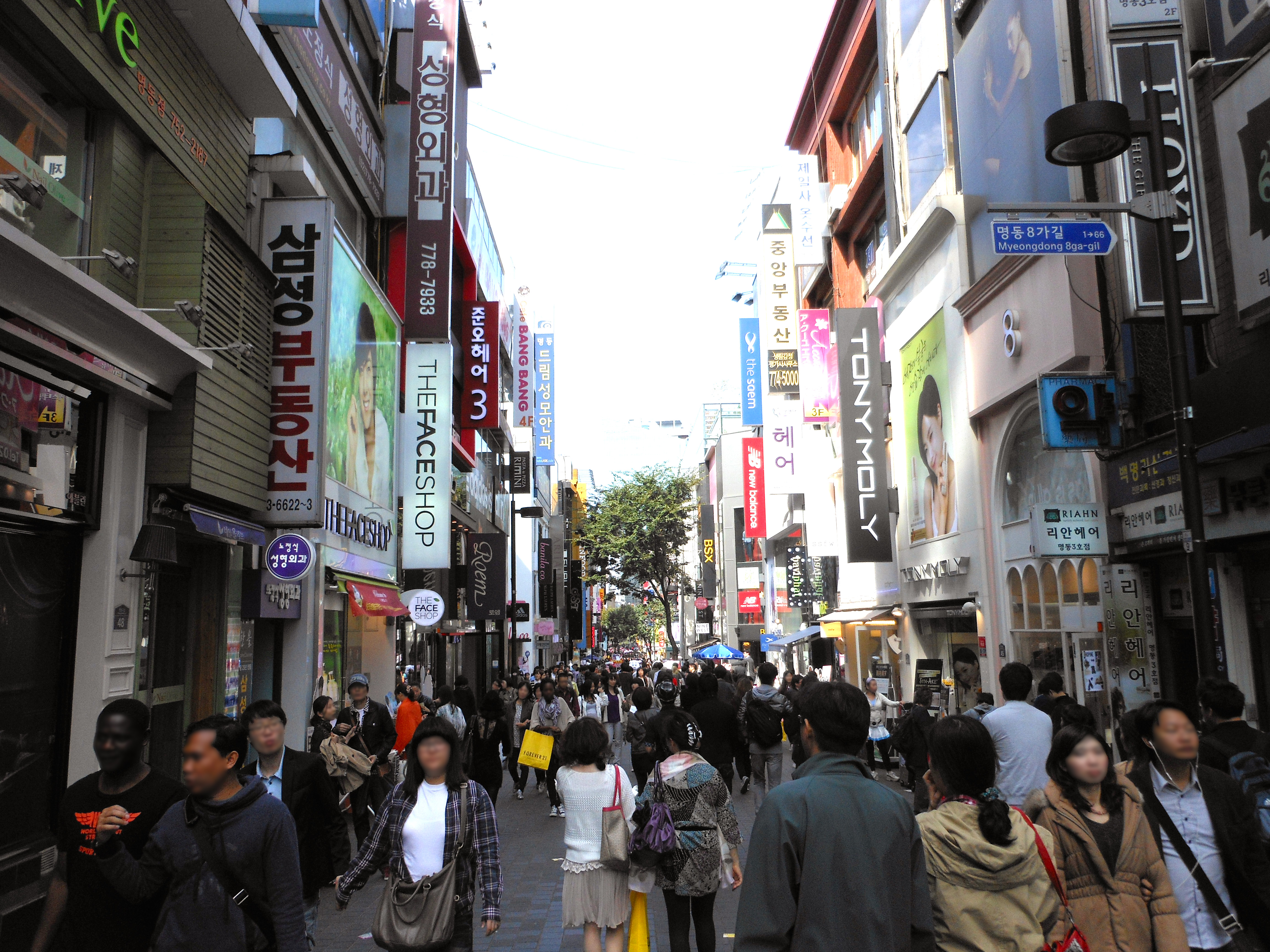
Myeongdong in Seoul

- Busan — Gwangbok-dong, Nampo-dong, Seomyeon, Centum City
- Daegu — Dongseongno
- Daejeon — Eunhaeng-dong, Dunsan
- Gwangju — Chungjangno, Geumnamno, Sangmu
- Seoul — Myeongdong, Namdaemun Market, Jongno, Insa-dong, Daehangno, Dongdaemun Market, Apgujeong, Cheongdam, Itaewon, Gangnam, Samseong-dong, Yongsan, Sinchon, Hongdae, Yeongdeungpo

=== Taiwan ===
- Kaohsiung—Sanduo Shopping District, Shinkuchan
- Taipei—Daan District, Ximending, Xinyi Planning District, Zhongxiao Road
- Taichung—Yizhong Street

=== Thailand ===
- Bangkok — Ratchaprasong, Sukhumvit Road, Thong Lor, Siam Square, Si Lom, Victory Monument, Ladprao, Ratchada, Chatuchak, Wang Lang, Bang Lumphu - Khao San Road, Phahurat - Sampeng, Bobae
- Chiang Mai — Changkran Road, Nimmanhemin Rd
- Hat Yai — Kimyong Market, Niphat Uthit 1st, 2nd, 3rd Roads, Sanehanusorn Road
- Pattaya — Beach Road
- Patong — Patong Beach Road
- Si Racha — Si Racha Nakorn Road

=== Turkey ===
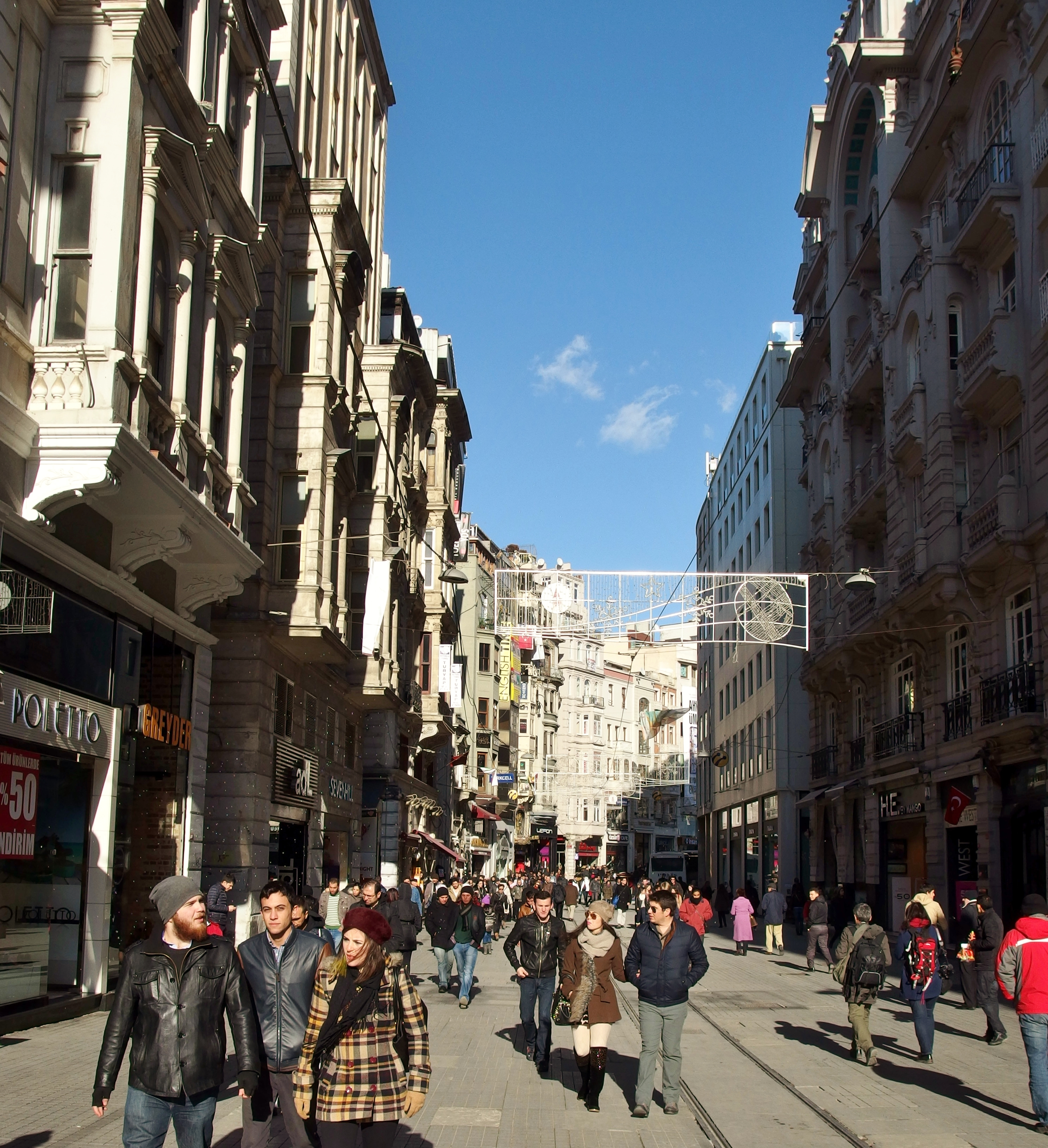
İstiklal Avenue in the Beyoğlu district of Istanbul

- Adana — Ziyapaşa Boulevard
- Ankara — Tunali Hilmi Street, 7th Street, Atatürk Boulevard, Gazi Mustafa Kemal Boulevard, Ankara, Mithatpasa Avenue,
- Antalya — Işıklar Avenue, Konyaaltı Avenue
- Bolu — İzzet Baysal Avenue
- Bursa — Çekirge Street, Fatih Sultan Mehmet Boulevard, Cumhuriyet Avenue
- Diyarbakır — Ofis Street
- Istanbul — Abdi İpekçi Avenue, Bağdat Avenue, İstiklal Avenue
- İzmir — Plevne Street, Kıbrıs Şehitleri Street, Kemeraltı
- Kocaeli — Fethiye Avenue
- Sakarya — Çark Avenue
- Samsun — Çiftlik Street
- Trabzon — Uzun Street, Kahramanmaraş Avenue
- Van — İskele Avenue
- Yalova — Yalı Avenue, Gazi Paşa Avenue

=== Vietnam ===
- Ho Chi Minh City — Downtown Saigon (Lê Lợi Boulevard, Nguyễn Huệ Boulevard, Hàm Nghi Boulevard, Trần Hưng Đạo Boulevard, Lê Duẩn Boulevard, Tôn Đức Thắng Boulevard, Đồng Khởi Street, Lê Thánh Tôn Street, Hai Bà Trưng Street, Nguyễn Trãi Street, Bùi Viện Street, Đề Thám Street, Phạm Ngũ Lão Street, Lê Lai Street, Nguyễn Thị Minh Khai Street, Nam Kỳ Khởi Nghĩa Street, Lam Sơn Square, Mê Linh Square, Paris Commune Square, International Square), Phan Xích Long Street, North Văn Thánh quarter, Phú Mỹ Hưng urban area, Thảo Điền, Trần Quang Diệu Street
- Hanoi — Tràng Tiền Street

== Europe ==
=== Austria ===
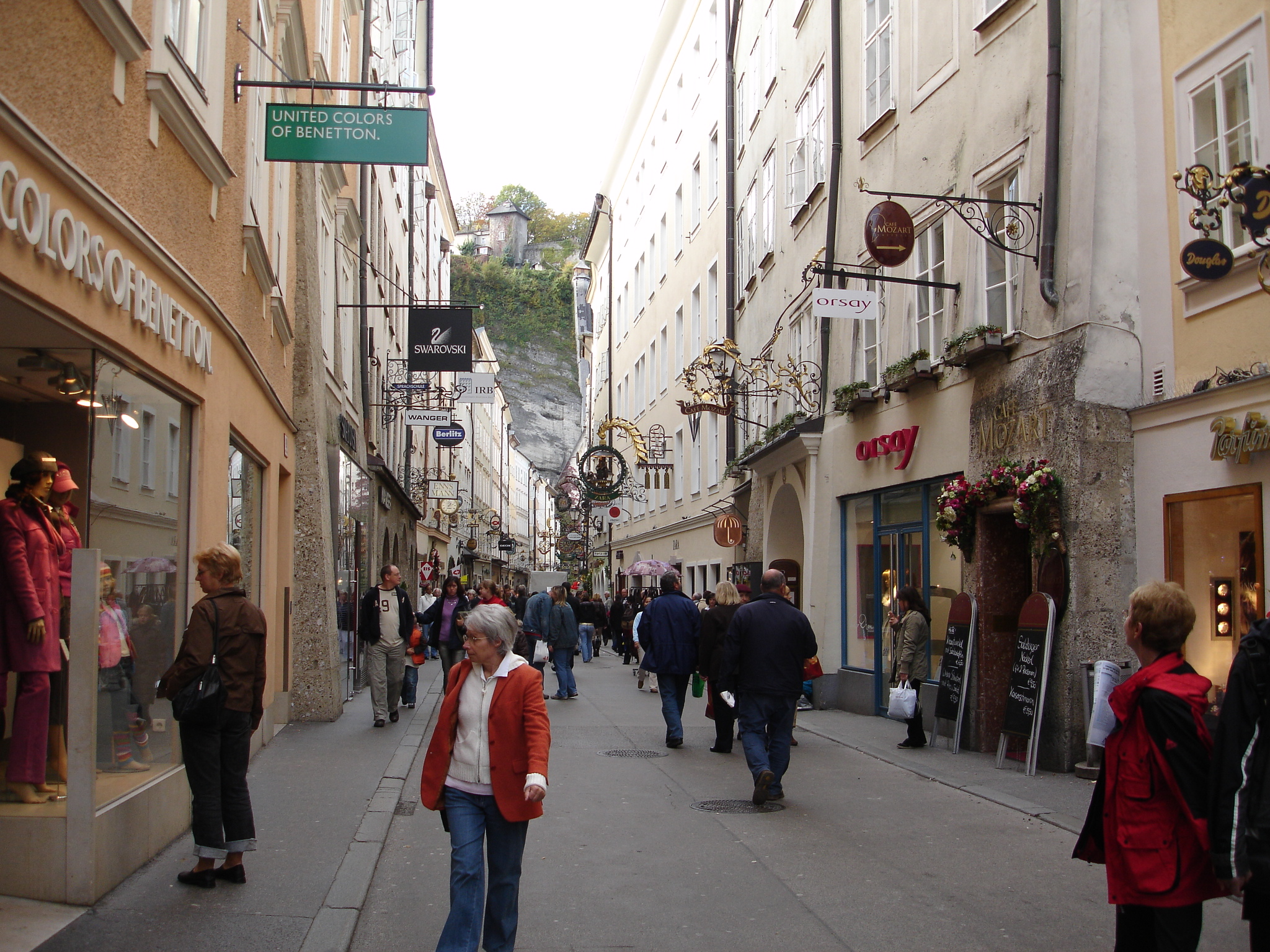
Getreidegasse, Salzburg, Austria

- Salzburg — Getreidegasse
- Vienna — Mariahilfer Straße, Neubaugasse, Favoritenstraße, Graben, Kohlmarkt, Kärntnerstraße
- Graz — Herrengasse

=== Belgium ===
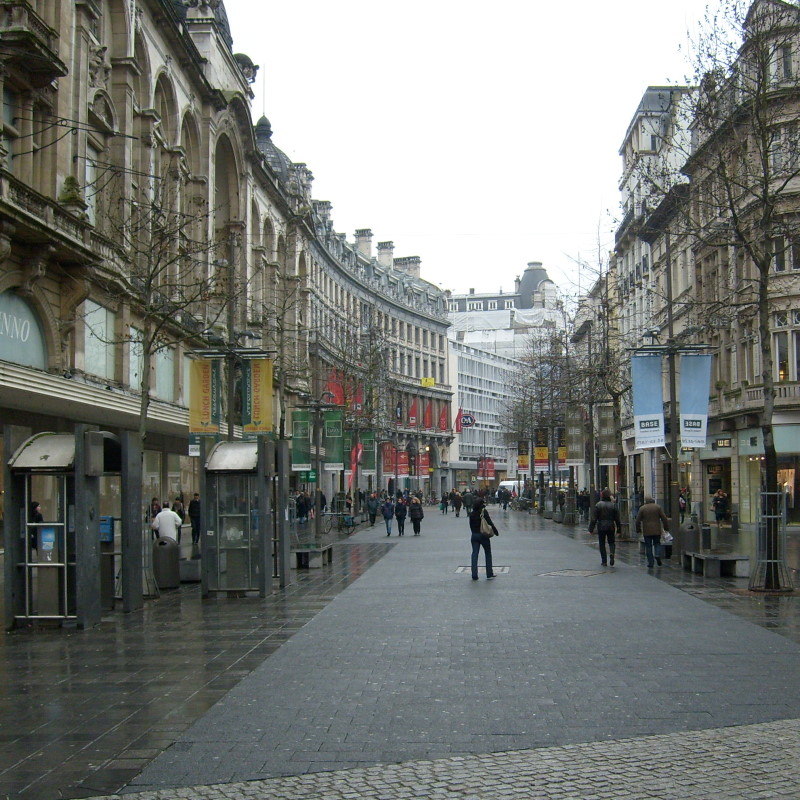
Meir, Antwerp, Belgium

- Antwerp — Meir, Schuttershofstraat, Huidevettersstraat, Leopoldstraat, Kelderstraat
- Bruges — Steenstraat
- Brussels — Avenue Louise/Louizalaan, Avenue de la Toison d'Or/Guldenvlieslaan, Rue Neuve/Nieuwstraat, Chaussée d'Ixelles/Elsenesesteenweg, Chaussée de Waterloo/ Waterloosesteenweg, Boulevard Anspach/Anspachlaan
- Charleroi — Rive Gauche
- Ghent — Veldstraat
- Hasselt — Koning Albertstraat, Hoogstraat, Demerstraat
- Kortrijk — Korte Steenstraat, Lange Steenstraat
- Knokke — Lippenslaan
- Namur — Rue de Fer

=== Bosnia and Herzegovina ===
- Banja Luka — Gospodska
- Sarajevo — Titova, Ferhadija and Sarači

=== Bulgaria ===
- Burgas — Aleksandrovska Street
- Plovdiv — Batenberg Street
- Sofia — Vitosha Boulevard, Graf Ignatiev Street, Shishman Street
- Varna — Knyaz Boris 1 Boulevard

=== Croatia ===
- Dubrovnik — Stradun
- Split — Riva, Marmontova
- Zagreb — Ilica

=== Cyprus ===
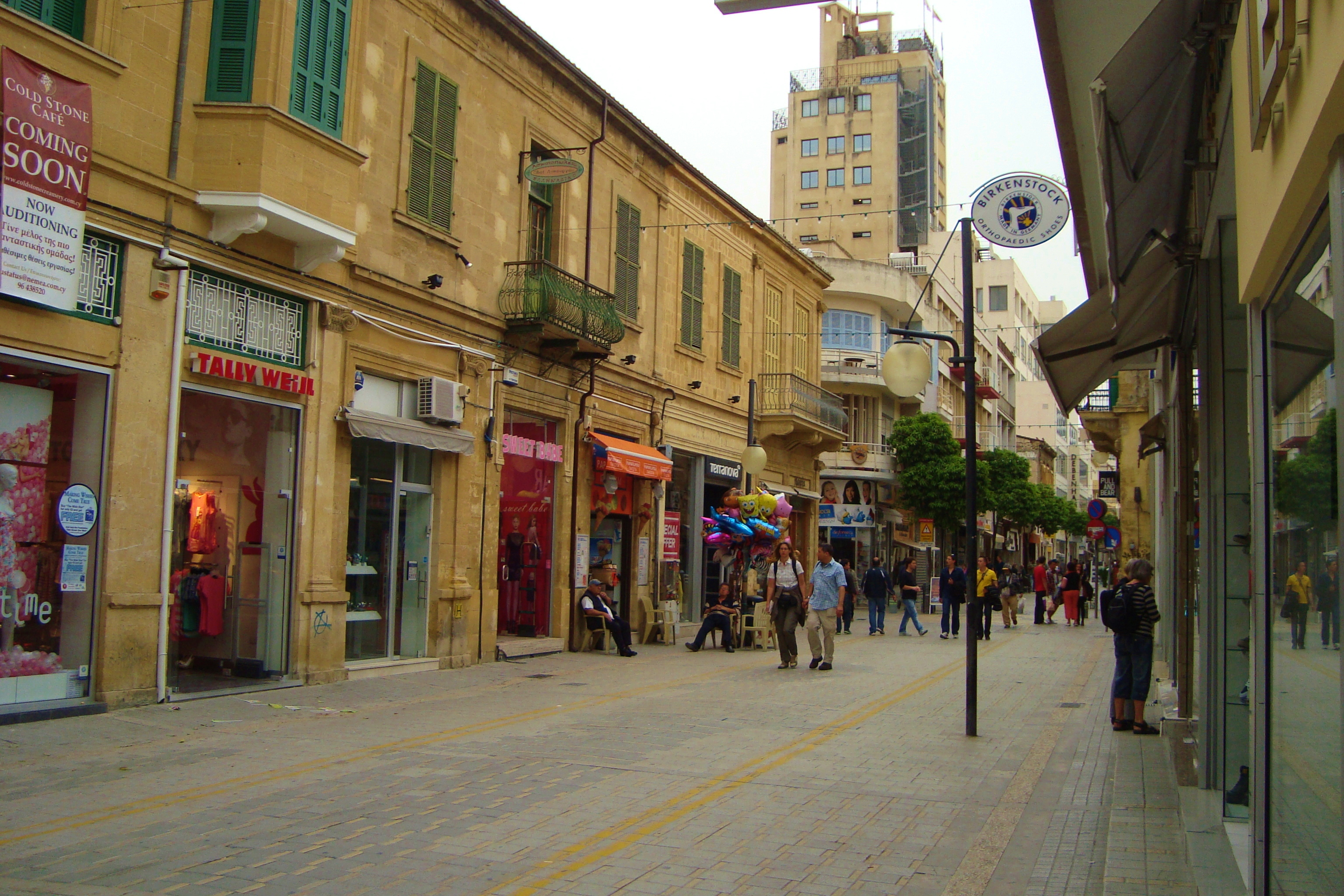
Ledra Street, Nicosia, Cyprus

- Nicosia - Ledra Street, Makariou Avenue, Onasagorou Street, Rigenis Street, Stasikratous Street, Themistokli Dervi Avenue
- Limassol - Makariou Avenue, Anexartisias Street, Agiou Andreou Street
- Larnaca - Ermou Street
- Paphos - Makariou III Avenue, Gladstonos Street, Ermou Street, Nikodemou Mylona Street
- Famagusta - University Avenue

=== Czech Republic ===
- Prague — Pařížská Street, Na Příkopech Street

=== Denmark ===
- Aarhus — Strøget
- Copenhagen — Strøget
- Odense — Vestergade and Kongensgade

=== Finland ===
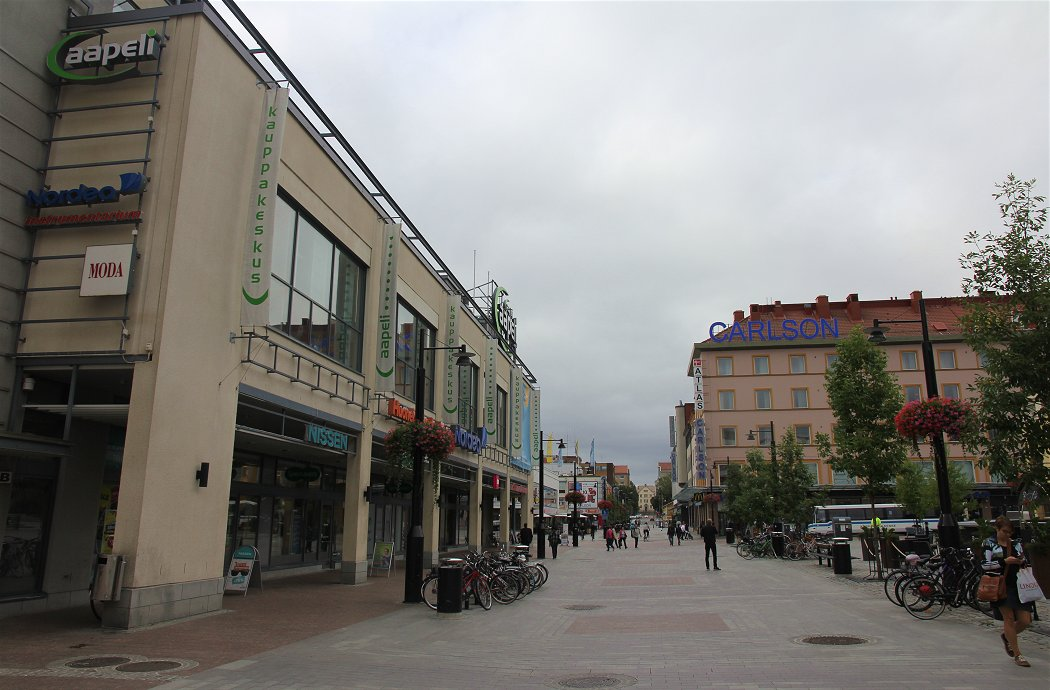
Kauppakatu, Kuopio, Finland

- Helsinki — Aleksanterinkatu, Esplanadi
- Kuopio — Kauppakatu
- Mariehamn — Torggatan
- Porvoo — Jokikatu
- Tampere — Hämeenkatu

=== France ===
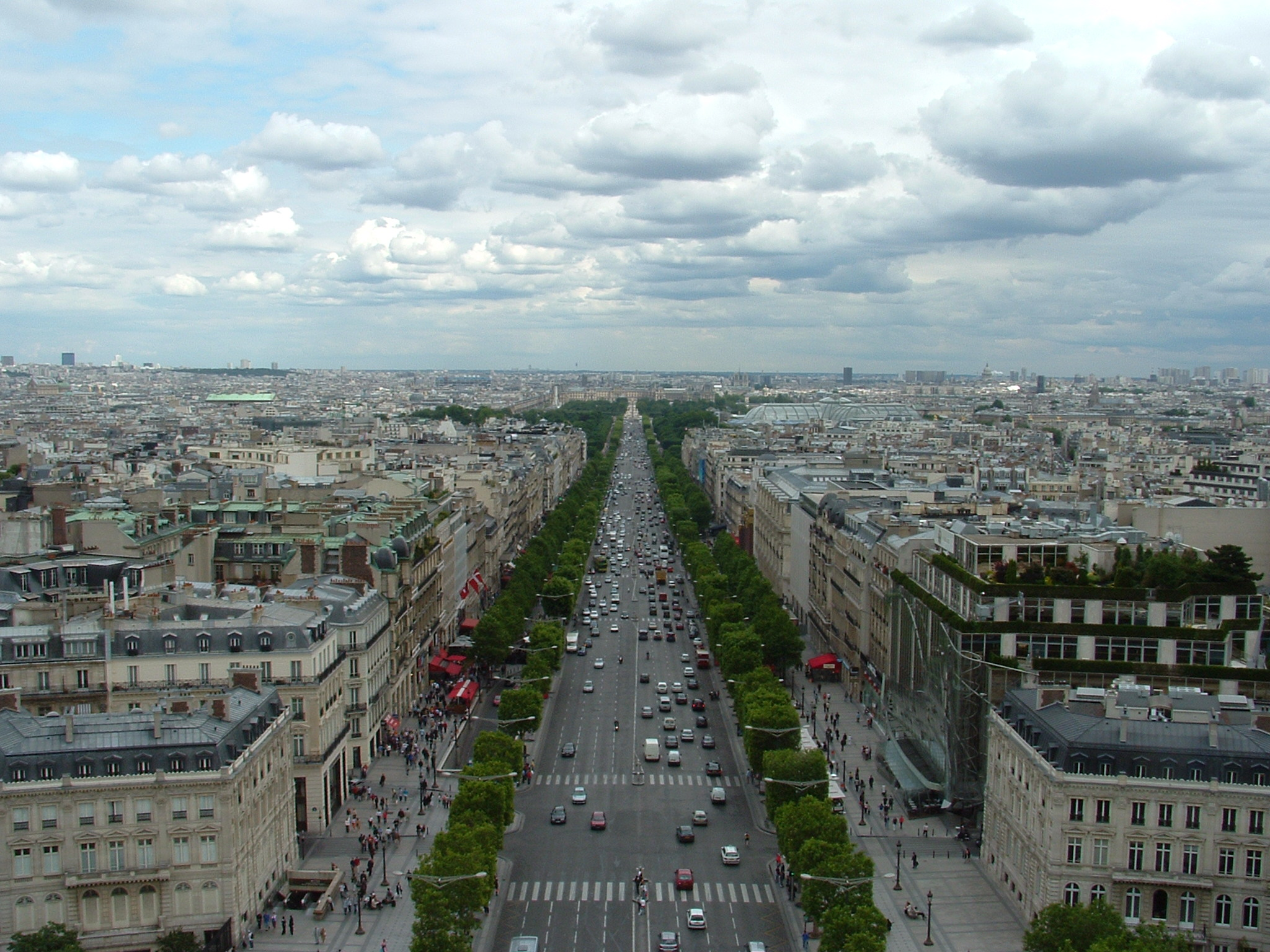
Champs-Élysées, Paris, France

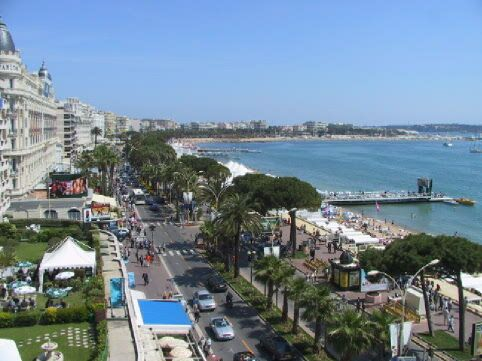
Promenade de la Croisette, Cannes, France

- Bordeaux — Rue Sainte-Catherine
- Brest — Rue de Siam
- Caen — Rue Saint-Pierre
- Cannes — Promenade de la Croisette, Rue d'Antibes
- Grenoble — Rue Félix Poulat, Place Grenette, Grande Rue, Rue de Bonne
- Le Havre — Rue de Paris; Avenue René Coty
- Lille — Vieux Lille, Euralille
- Lyon — Place Bellecour, Rue du Plat, Rue de la République, Rue Édouard Herriot, Rue Émile Zola
- Marseille — Cours Saint-Louis, Rue Saint-Ferréol, Rue Paradis, Rue Sainte, Place Lulli and Rue Grignan
- Metz — Rue Serpenoise, Rue des Clercs, Rue du Palais, Rue de la Tête d'Or, Rue Taison, Rue des Jardins, En Fournirue, En Chaplerue
- Montpellier — Rue de la Loge, Place de la Comédie
- Nancy — Rue Saint-Jean, Rue Saint-Georges, Rue Saint-Dizier, Rue Gambetta, Rue Stanislas, Rue Raugraff, Place Henri Mengin
- Nantes — Rue de Verdun, Rue de la Marne, Rue de la Barillerie, Rue d'Orléans, Place Royale, Passage Pommeraye, Rue Crébillon, Place Graslin, Rue de la Fosse
- Nice — Avenue Jean-Médecin, Rue Paradis, Avenue de Verdun
- Paris — Champs-Élysées, Boulevard Haussmann, Rue de Rivoli, Boulevard des Capucines, Rue du Faubourg Saint Honoré, Avenue Montaigne, Avenue George V, the axis formed by Rue de Castiglione, Place Vendôme, Rue de la Paix and Place de l'Opéra, Rue de Sèvres, Rue du Bac, Rue des Francs-Bourgeois (along with other streets in Le Marais), as well as segments of Boulevard Saint-Germain and Rue de Rennes near Saint-Germain-des-Prés
- Rouen — Rue Jeanne d'Arc, Rue du Gros-Horloge
- Saint-Étienne — Place Dorian, Rue du Général Foy, Rue Gambetta
- Saint-Tropez — Quai Jean Jaurès, Quai Suffren
- Strasbourg — Grande Île
- Toulouse — Rue Saint-Rome
- Tours — Rue Nationale, Place Jean Jaurès

=== Germany ===
Alexanderplatz, Berlin, Germany

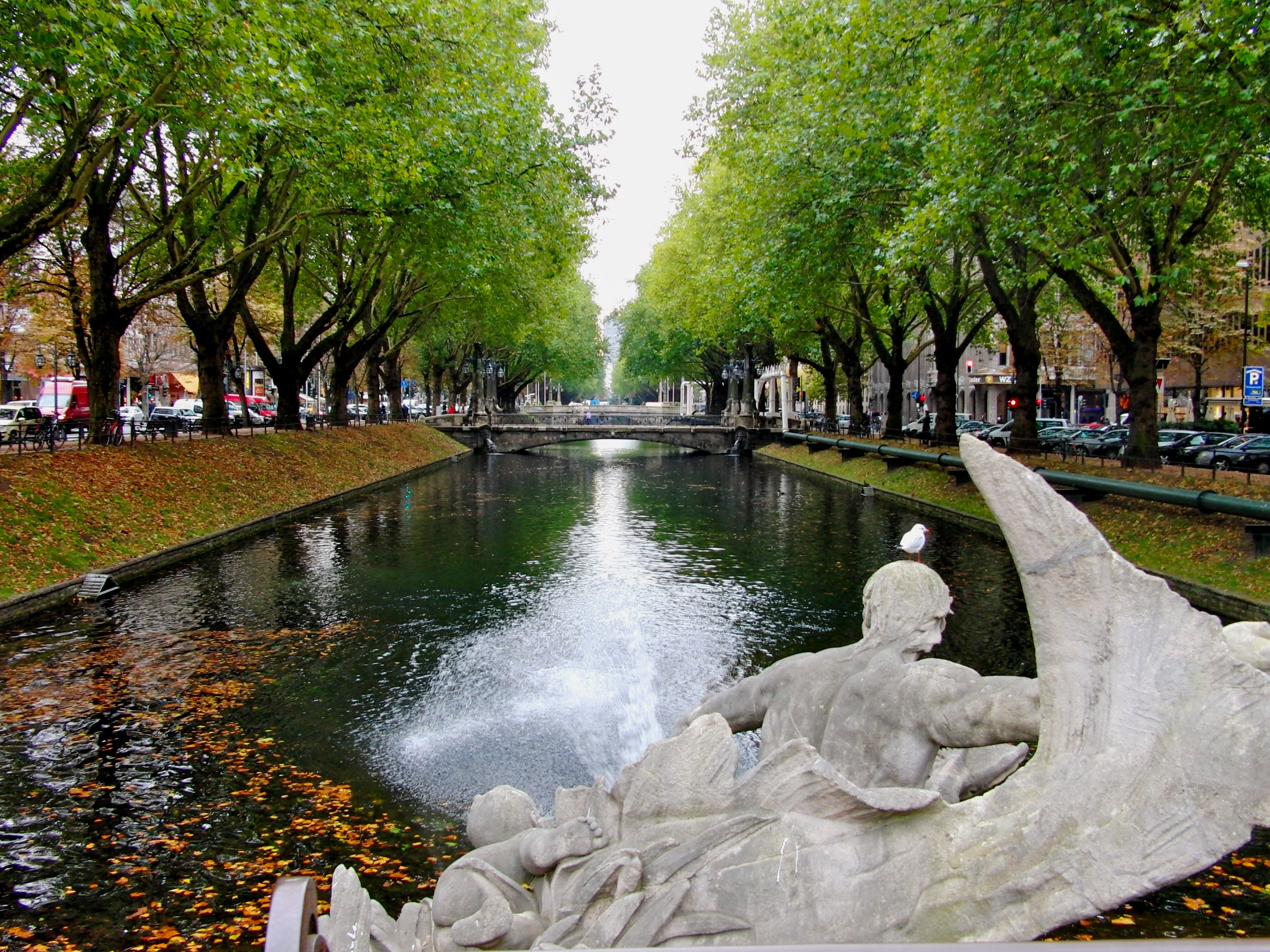
Königsallee, Düsseldorf, NRW, Germany

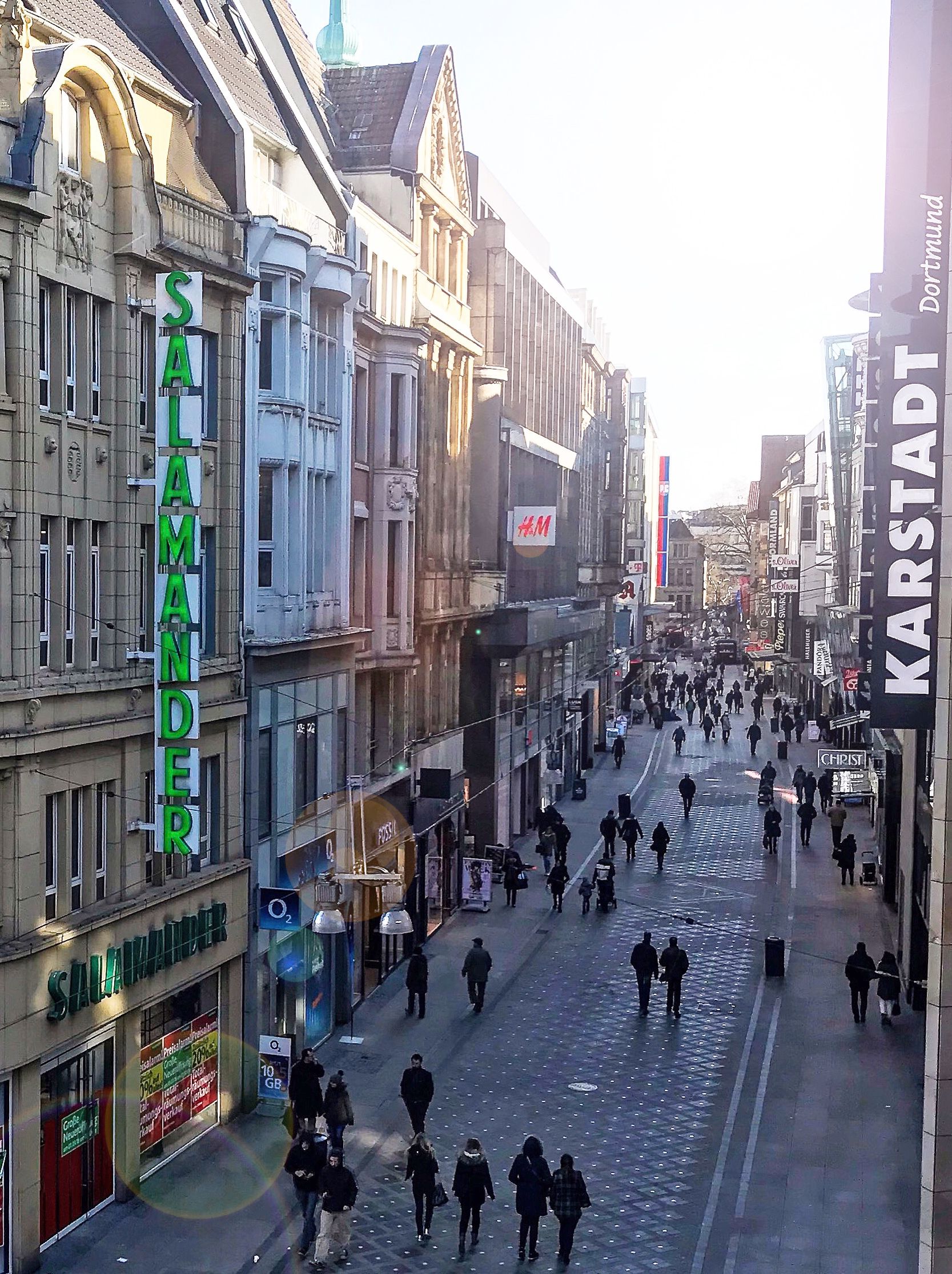
Westenhellweg, Dortmund, NRW, Germany

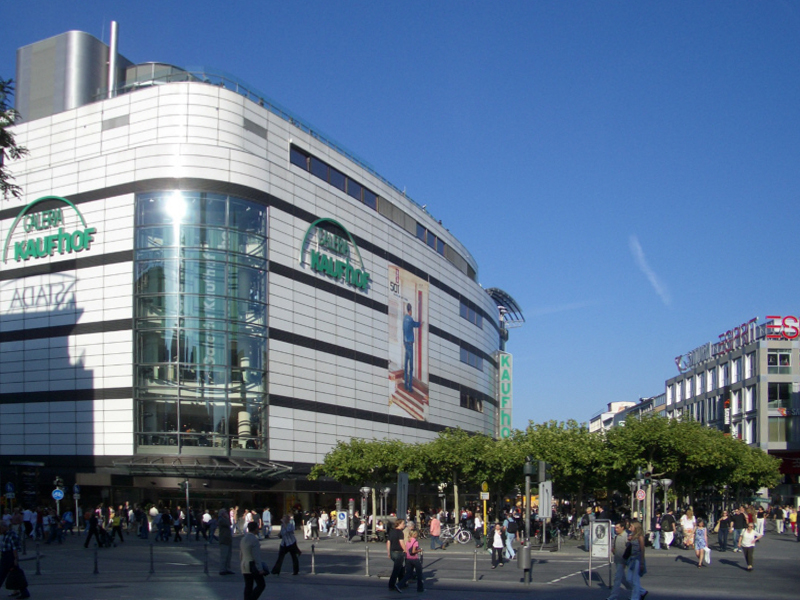
Zeil, Frankfurt, Hesse, Germany

- Berlin — Alexanderplatz, Tauentzienstraße, Kurfürstendamm, Schloßstraße, Friedrichstraße
- Bochum — Kortumstraße
- Bremen — Obernstraße
- Cologne — Hohe Straße, Schildergasse
- Dortmund — Westenhellweg
- Dresden — Prager Straße, Königstraße
- Duisburg — Königstraße
- Düsseldorf — Schadowstraße, Königsallee
- Erfurt — Anger
- Essen — Kettwiger Straße
- Flensburg — Holm
- Frankfurt — Zeil, Neue Kräme, Roßmarkt, Goethestraße
- Freiburg im Breisgau — Kaiser-Joseph-Straße
- Hamburg — Mönckebergstraße, Spitalerstraße, Neuer Wall, Große Bleichen, Jungfernstieg
- Hannover — Georgstraße, Bahnhofstraße
- Karlsruhe — Kaiserstraße
- Kassel — Königsstraße
- Kiel — Holstenstraße, Dänische Straße
- Leipzig — Petersstrasse, Grimmaische Strasse
- Mannheim — Planken
- Munich — Kaufingerstraße, Neuhauser Straße, Theatinerstraße, Maximilianstraße
- Mönchengladbach — Hindenburgstraße
- Nuremberg — Karolinenstraße
- Stuttgart — Königstraße
- Wiesbaden — Wilhelmstraße, Kirchgasse

=== Greece ===
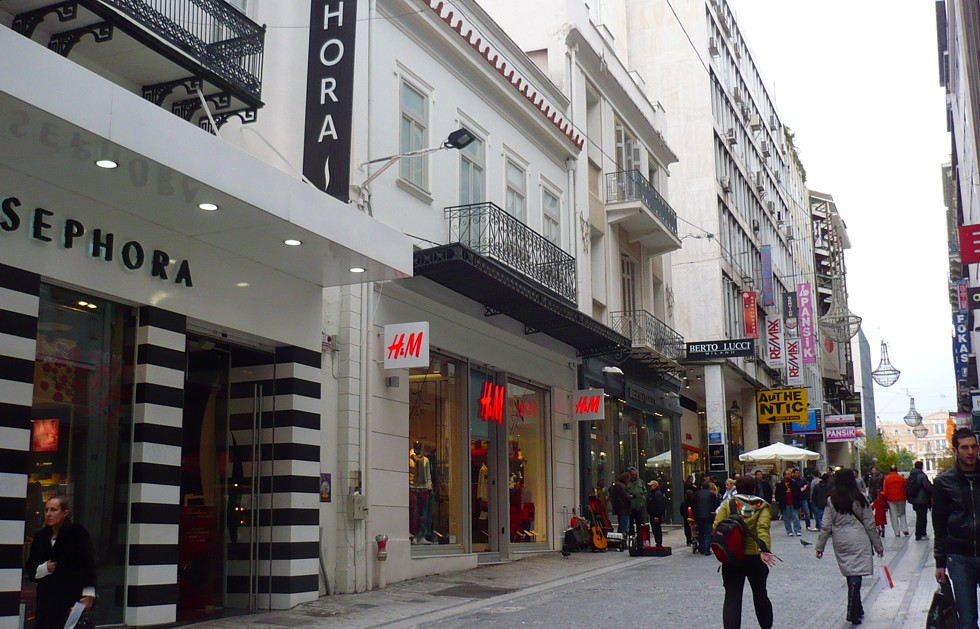
Ermou Street, Athens, Greece

- Athens — Voukourestiou Street, Ermou Street, Panepistimiou Street, Kifissia around Kasavetis Street and Levidou Street
- Corfu — George Theotokis Street
- Patras — Riga Feraiou Street
- Thessaloniki — Tsimiski Street, Mediterranean Cosmos

=== Hungary ===
- Budapest — Andrássy Avenue, Váci utca, Deák utca
- Szeged — Kárász Street,

=== Ireland ===
- Cork — St. Patrick's Street, Oliver Plunkett Street
- Drogheda — West Street
- Dublin — Grafton Street, Henry Street, O'Connell Street, Wicklow Street, North Earl Street
- Galway — Shop Street
- Limerick — O'Connell Street
- Swords — Main Street

=== Iceland ===
- Reykjavík — Laugavegur

=== Italy ===
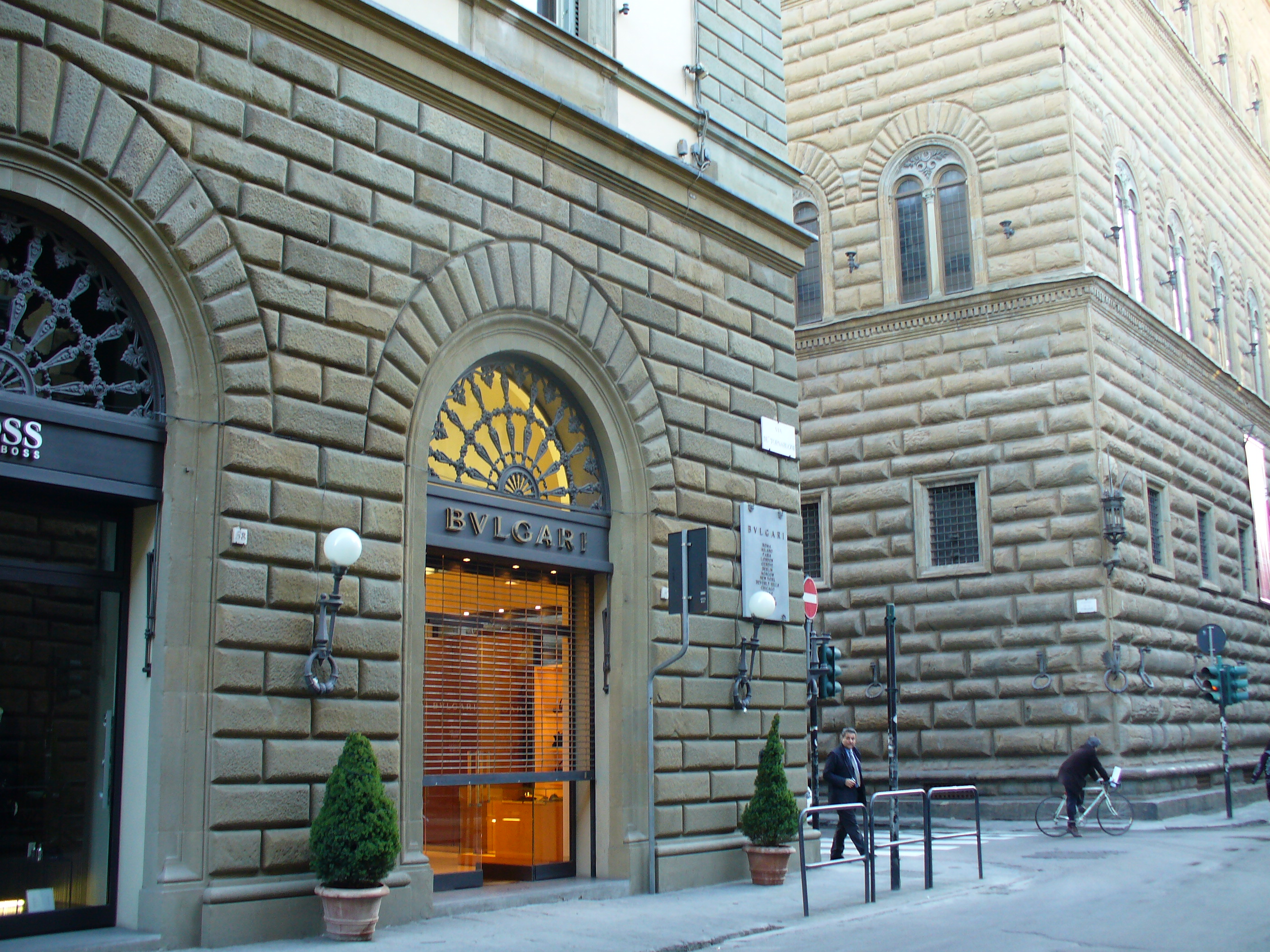
Via de' Tornabuoni, Florence, Tuscany, Italy

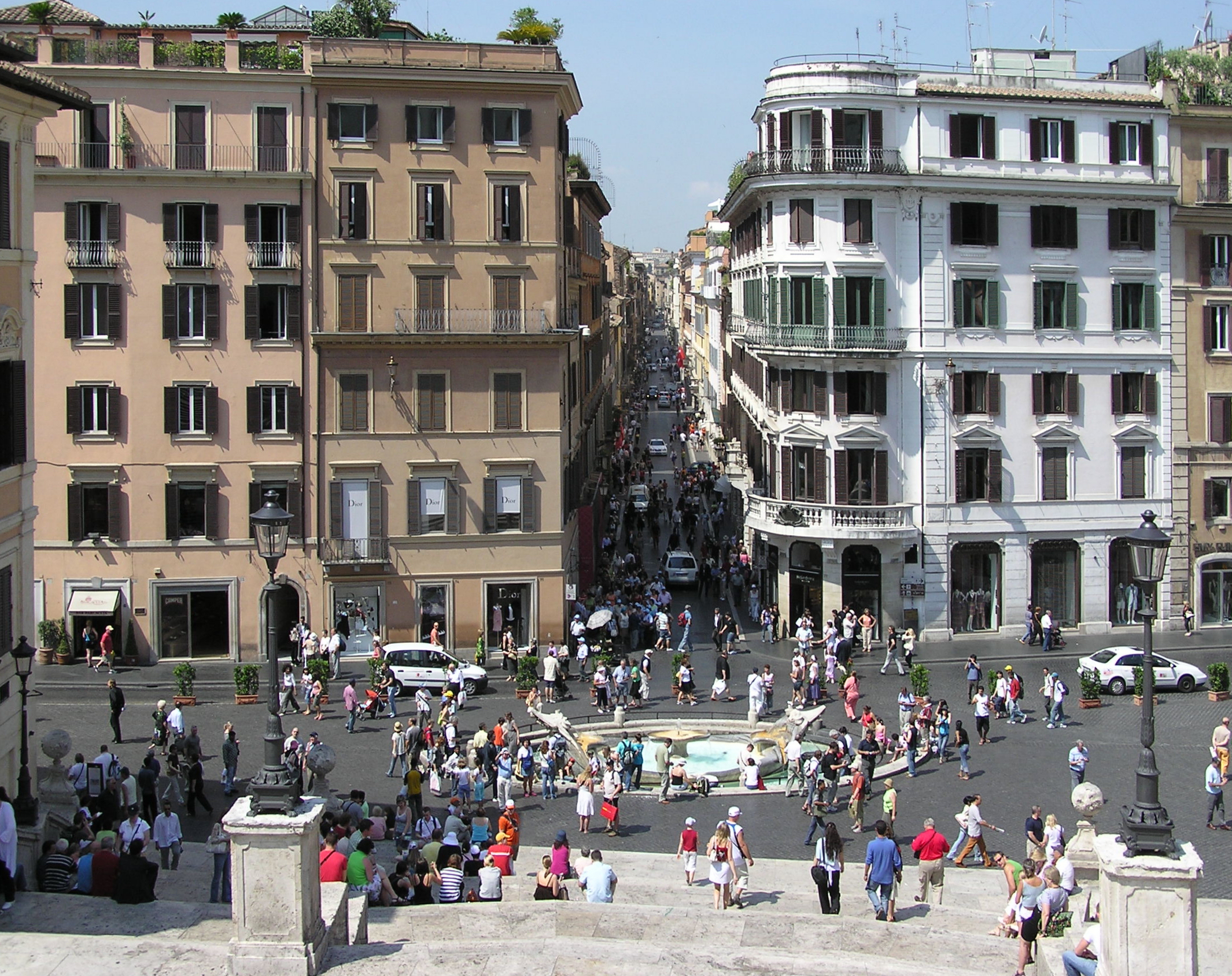
Via Condotti, Rome, Lazio, Italy

- Bari — Via Sparano, Corso Vittorio Emanuele, Corso Cavour
- Bergamo — Via XX Settembre, Via Gerolamo Tiraboschi, Via Zambonate, Via Giorgio e Guido Paglia, Viale Papa Giovanni XXIII
- Bologna — Via Farini, Via dell'Indipendenza
- Brescia — Corso Palestro, Corso Magenta, Via San Martino della Battaglia
- Cagliari — Via Manno, Via Garibaldi
- Catania — Via Etnea, Corso Italia
- Capri — Via Camerelle
- Florence — Via dei Calzaiuoli, Via della Vigna Nuova, Via Roma, Via de' Tornabuoni, Piazza della Repubblica
- Genoa — Via Roma, Via XX Settembre (it), Via Luccoli, Via San Vincenzo, Via San Luca, Via XXV Aprile,
- La Spezia — Corso Cavour, Via Prione, Via Chiodo
- Livorno — Via Ricasoli, Via Grande
- Lecce — Piazza Mazzini, Corso Vittorio Emanuele II
- Milan — Corso Vittorio Emanuele II, Via Montenapoleone, Corso Giacomo Matteotti, Galleria Vittorio Emanuele, Via della Spiga, Corso di Porta Romana, Corso Italia, Corso Venezia, Piazza San Babila, Via Manzoni, Via San Pietro all'Orto, Via Sant'Andrea, Via Verri, Corso Vercelli, Corso Buenos Aires
- Naples — Via Toledo, Via Chiaia, Piazza de' Martiri, Via Calabritto, Via Scarlatti, Via G. Filangieri, Via dei Mille
- Padua — Via San Fermo, Via Altinate, Piazza Garibaldi, Via Santa Lucia, Via Cavour
- Palermo — Via Ruggero Settimo, Viale della Libertà, Via Roma
- Pisa — Corso Italia, Borgo Stretto
- Rome — Via Cola di Rienzo, Via dei Condotti, Via Frattina, Via del Babuino, Via del Corso, Via Veneto
- Salerno — Corso Vittorio Emanuele, Via Mercanti, Via dei Principati
- Taranto — Via Tommaso D'Aquino, Via Acclavio, Via Pupino, Via Di Palma
- Turin — Via Roma, Via Garibaldi, Via Lagrange, Via Po, Via Carlo Alberto, Via XX Settembre
- Venice — Piazza San Marco, Calle Larga XXII Marzo, Calle Valaresso, Salizada San Moisé
- Verona — Via Mazzini, Corso di Porta Borsari, Via Cappello, Piazza Erbe

=== Latvia ===
- Riga — Dzirnavu iela, Elizabetes iela, Terbatas iela

=== Lithuania ===
- Kaunas — Laisvės alėja
- Vilnius — Gedimino prospektas

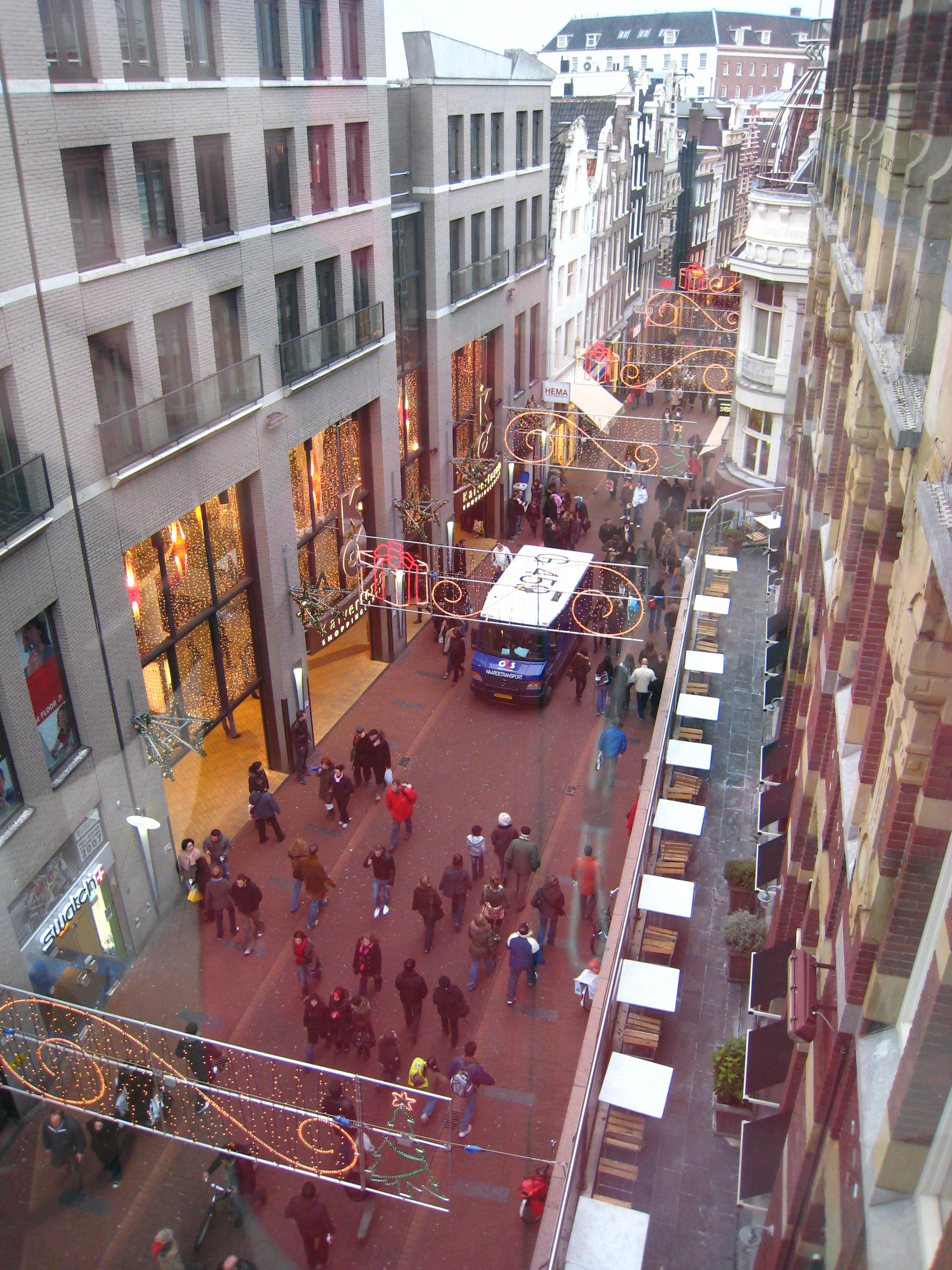
Kalverstraat, Amsterdam, the Netherlands

=== Luxembourg ===
- Luxembourg City — Groussgaass

=== Montenegro ===
- Podgorica — Slobode Street, Džordža Vašingtona Boulevard

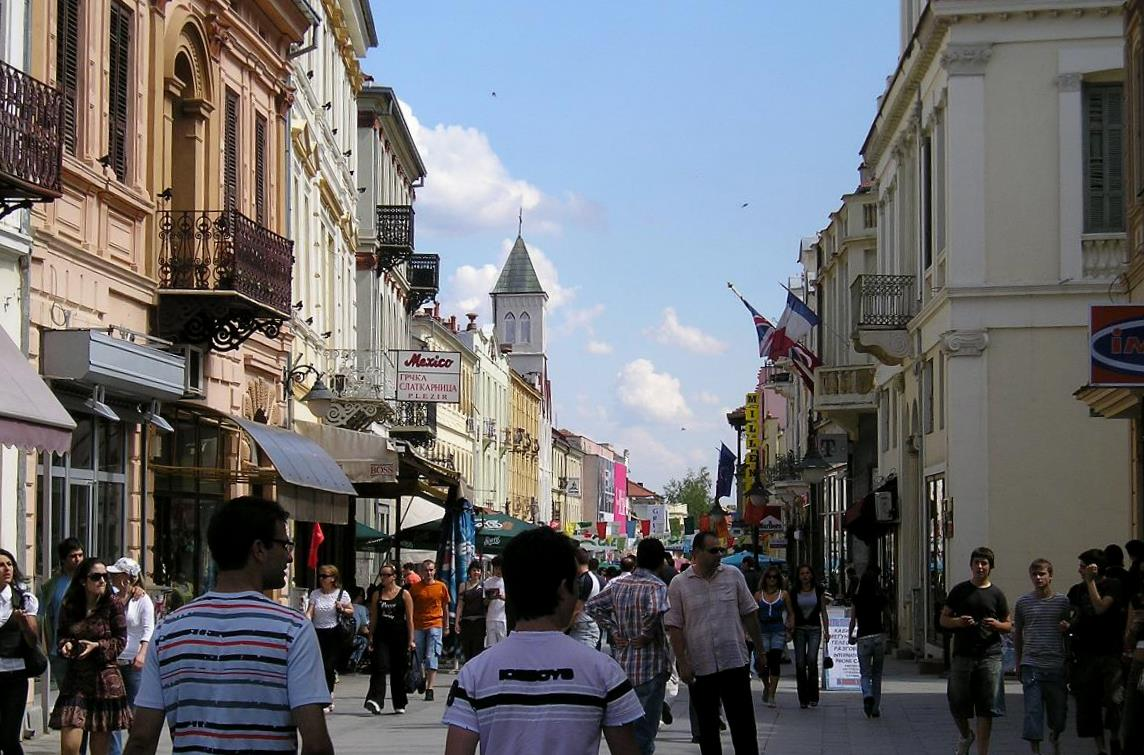
Širok Sokak, Bitola, North Macedonia

=== Netherlands ===
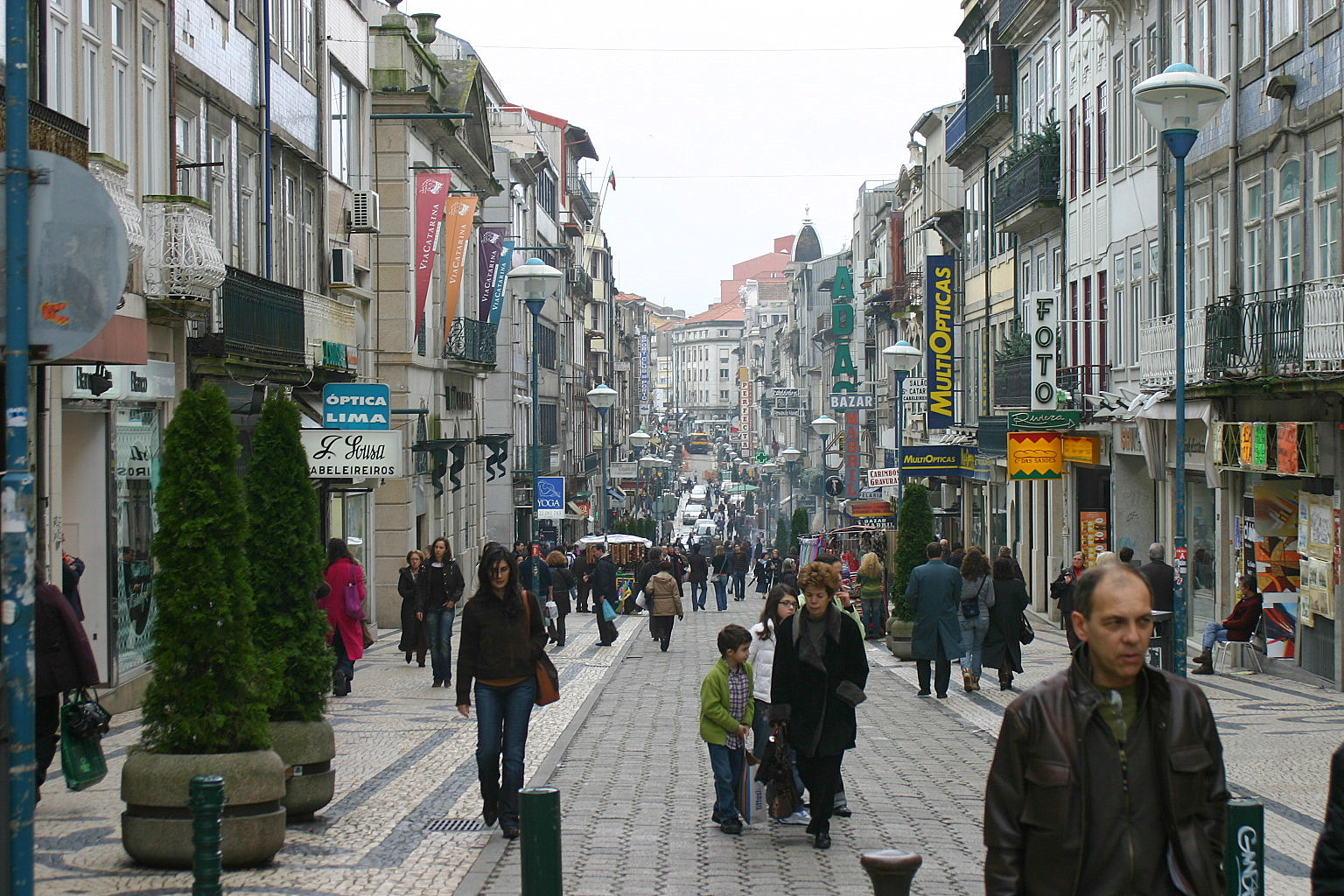
Rua de Santa Catarina, Porto, Portugal

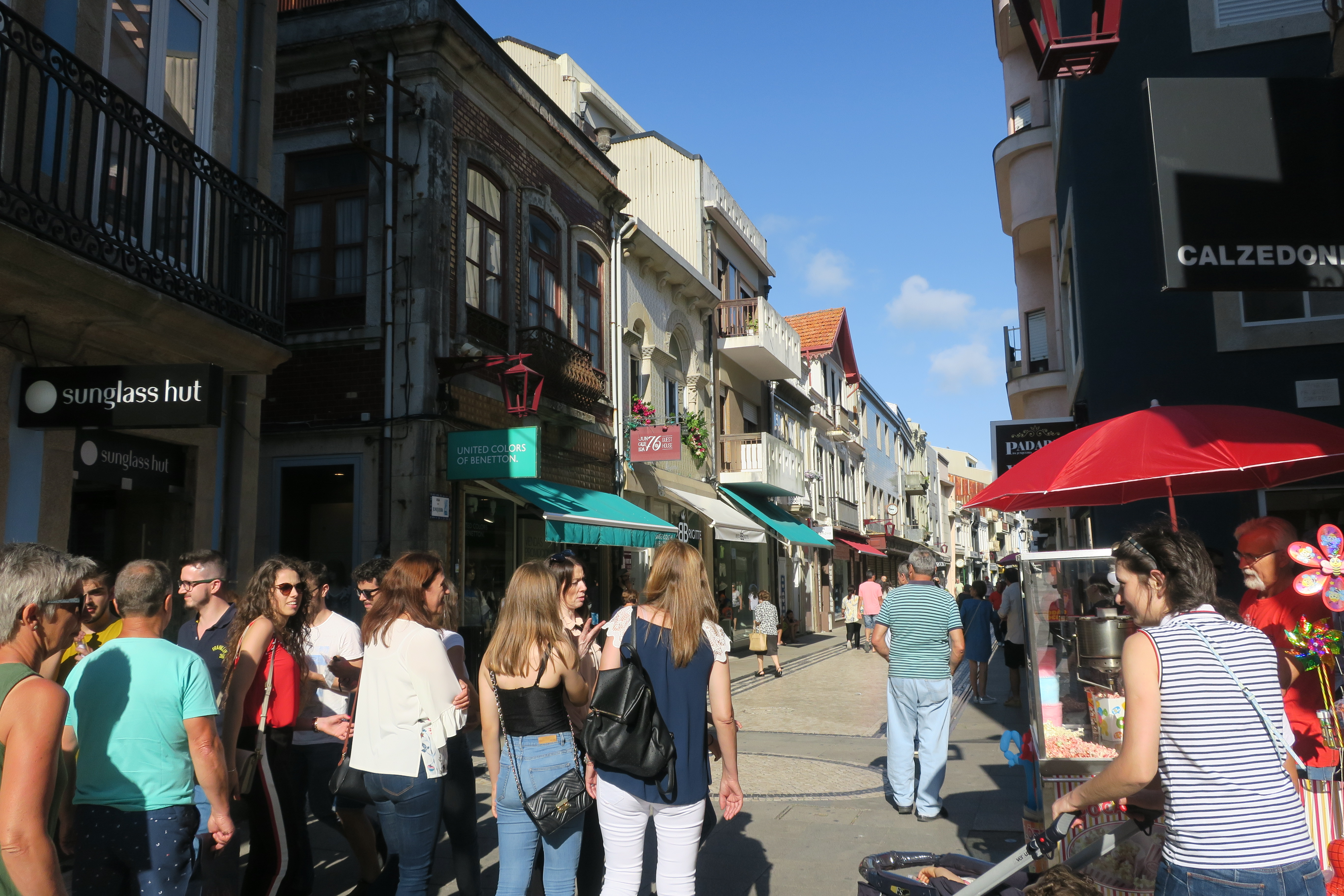
Rua da Junqueira, Póvoa de Varzim, Portugal

- 's-Hertogenbosch — Hinthamerstraat, Markt
- Amsterdam — Haarlemmerdijk, Kalverstraat, Rokin, Leidsestraat, Negen Straatjes, Utrechtsestraat, P.C. Hooftstraat
- Arnhem — Ketelstraat, Steenstraat
- Eindhoven — Demer
- Haarlem — Grote Houtstraat
- The Hague — City centre: Hoogstraat – Noordeinde, Denneweg – Frederikstraat; Sub centre: Van Hoytemastraat, Frederik Hendriklaan
- Leiden — Breestraat, Haarlemmerstraat
- Maastricht — Grote Staat, Stokstraat
- Rotterdam — Beurstraverse, Coolsingel, Hoogstraat, Lijnbaan

=== North Macedonia ===
- Bitola — Širok Sokak
- Skopje — Macedonia Street, Old Bazaar, Bit pazar

=== Norway ===
- Bergen — Strandgaten, Torgallmenningen
- Oslo — Karl Johans gate, Bogstadveien, Torggata, Markveien
- Trondheim — Nordre gate

=== Poland ===
- Bydgoszcz — Gdańska, Dworcowa, Długa
- Gdańsk — Długi Targ, Mariacka
- Gdynia — Świętojańska
- Katowice — 3 maja, Stawowa, Staromiejska, Mielęckiego, Mariacka
- Kielce — Sienkiewicza
- Kraków — Floriańska, Grodzka, Sienna
- Łódź — Piotrkowska
- Poznań — Półwiejska, Święty Marcin, Plac Wolności
- Sopot — Bohaterów Monte Cassino
- Toruń — Szeroka
- Warsaw — Nowy Świat, Marszałkowska, Świętokrzyska, Aleje Jerozolimskie, Chmielna
- Wrocław — Świdnicka, Oławska, Kuznicza, Ruska, Szewska
- Zakopane — Krupówki

=== Portugal ===
- Coimbra — Ferreira Borges Street, Visconde da Luz
- Figueira da Foz — Rua da República
- Lisbon — Rua Augusta, Avenida da Liberdade, Rua Garrett, Rua do Ouro, Chiado, Baixa Pombalina, Rua do Carmo, Rossio
- Porto — Rua de Santa Catarina
- Póvoa de Varzim — Rua da Junqueira, Avenida Mouzinho de Albuquerque

=== Romania ===
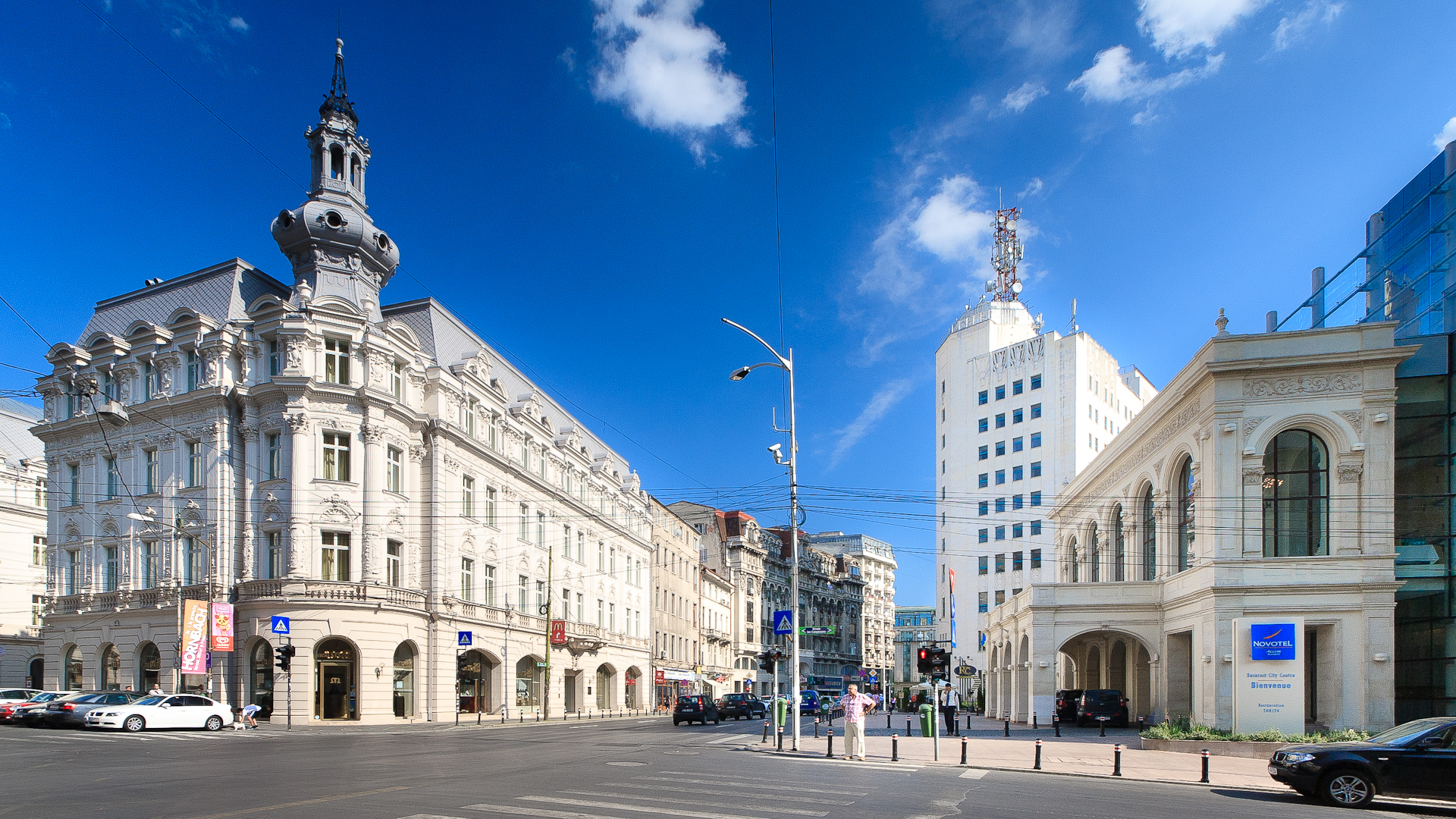
Calea Victoriei, Bucharest, Romania

- Bucharest — Calea Victoriei, Bulevardul Magheru, Bulevardul Nicolae Bălcescu
- Cluj-Napoca — Bulevardul Eroilor, Piaţa Unirii, Bulevardul Regele Ferdinand
- Constanţa — Strada Ștefan cel Mare, Bulevardul Tomis, Bulevardul Alexandru Lăpuşneanu
- Oradea — Calea Republicii

=== Russia ===
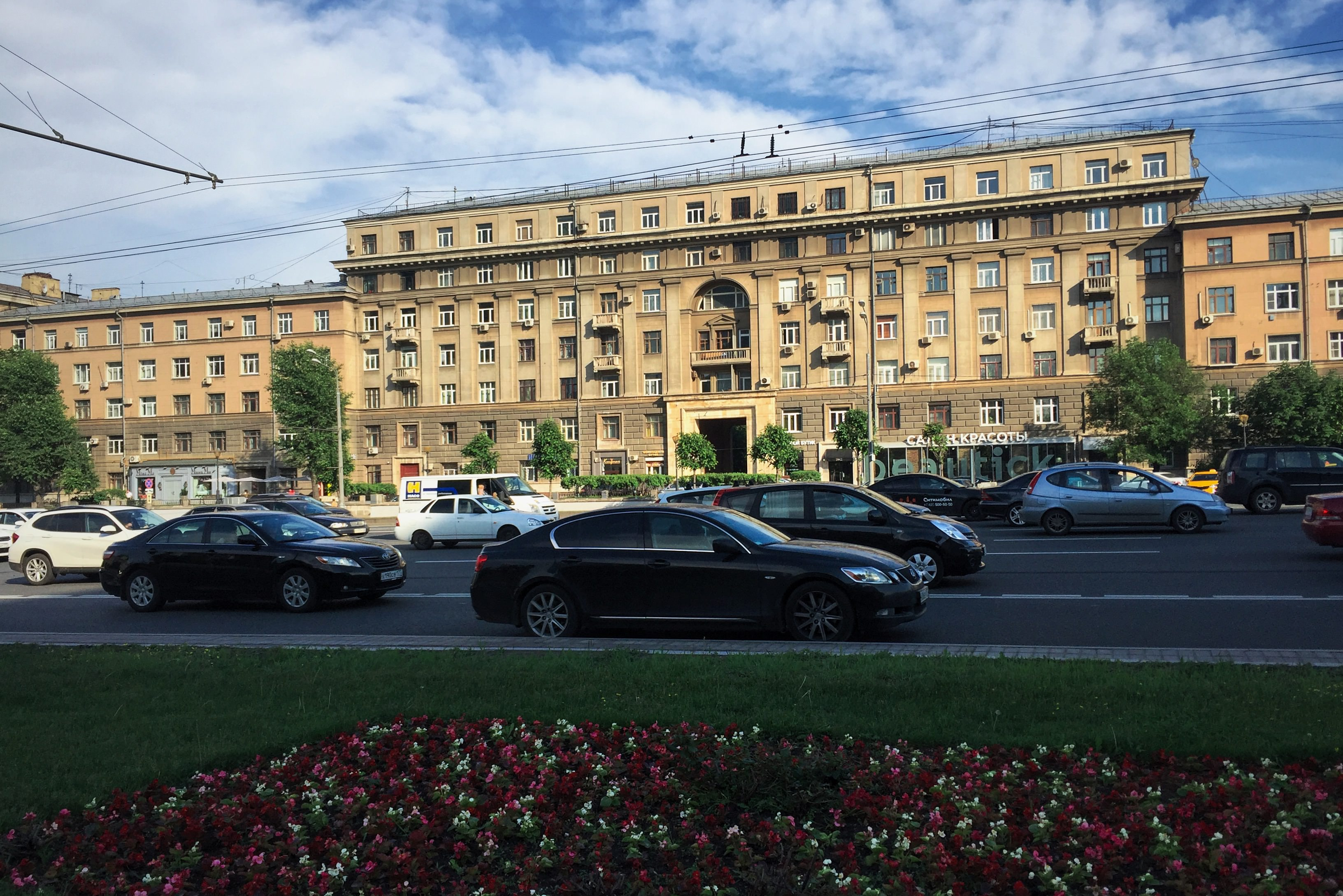
Kutuzovsky Prospekt, Moscow, Russia

- Kazan — Baumana Street, Pushkina Street, Kremlyovskaya Street
- Krasnodar — Krasnaya Street
- Moscow — Tverskaya Street area (including Kuznetsky Most, Stoleshnikov Lane and Tverskoy Boulevard); Petrovka Street, Tretyakov Drive, Arbat Street, Novy Arbat Street, Kutuzovsky Prospekt, Leninsky Avenue
- Rostov-on-Don — Bolshaya Sadovaya Street
- Saint Petersburg — Nevsky Prospekt (Staryi Nevsky Prospect), Liteyny Prospekt, Sadovaya Street, Bolshoi Prospekt Petrogradskoy Storony
- Sochi — Navaginskaya Street, Vorovskogo Street, Democraticheskaya Street
- Volgograd — Lenin Avenue, Raboche-Krestiyanskaya Street
- Yekaterinburg — Prospekt Lenina, Kuybysheva Street

=== Serbia ===
- Belgrade — Knez Mihailova

=== Slovakia ===
- Bratislava — Obchodna Street

=== Spain ===
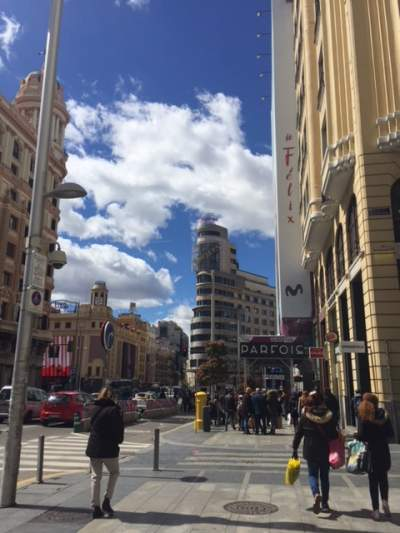
Gran Vía, Madrid, Spain

- A Coruña — Calle Real, Plaza de Lugo, Calle Barcelona
- Barcelona — Portal de l'Àngel, Carrer de la Portaferrissa Passeig de Gràcia, Rambla Catalunya, Avinguda Diagonal, Carrer de Pelai, Carrer de Sants
- Granada — Calle Recogidas
- Las Palmas de Gran Canaria — Calle Mayor de Triana
- Logroño — Calle Laurel (es)
- Madrid — Calle Serrano y Calle José Ortega y Gasset both in Barrio de Salamanca, Gran Vía, Calle Fuencarral, Calle Mayor, Calle del Carmen, Calle Preciados
- Málaga — Calle Marqués de Larios
- Marbella — Avenida Ramón y Cajal, Avenida Ricardo Soriano
- Seville — Calle Tetuán, Calle Sierpes
- Puerto Banús — Muelle Ribera
- Valencia — Carrer Colón, Carrer En Joan d'Àustria
- Vigo — Calle Principe, Calle Urzaiz, Calle Gran Via

=== Sweden ===
- Malmö — Södra Förstadsgatan
- Gothenburg — Avenyn
- Stockholm — Biblioteksgatan, Drottninggatan, Götgatan, Västerlånggatan, Birger Jarlsgatan

=== Switzerland ===
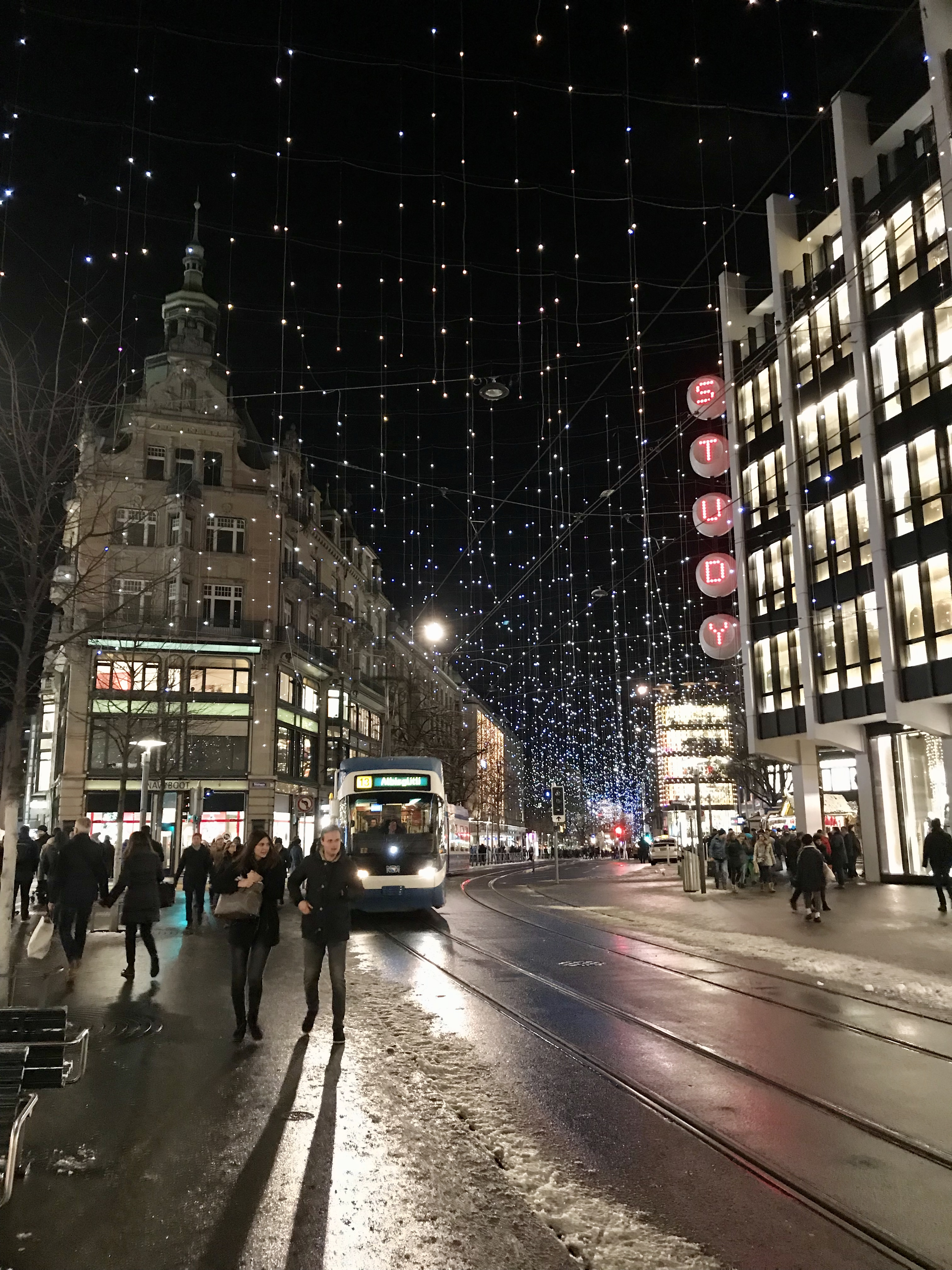
Zurich's Bahnhofstrasse with Christmas lights

- Appenzell — Hauptgasse, Hirschengasse
- Basel — Freie Strasse, Gerbergasse, Steinenvorstadt, Marktplatz, Eisengasse
- Bern — Old City (i.e., Marktgasse, Spitalgasse, and Kramgasse)
- Geneva — "Les Rues Basses" (i.e., Rue de la Confédération, Rue du Marché, Rue de la Croix d'Or and Rue de Rive), Rue du Rhône
- Gstaad — Promenade
- Lausanne — Rue de Bourg, Place St. Francois, Rue St. Francois, Rue du Pont, Place de la Palud, Rue Saint Laurent, Rue Haldimand, Flon
- Lugano — Via Nassa, Via Pessina
- Lucerne — Old City (Hertensteinstrasse, Weggisgasse, Kappelgasse), Schwanenplatz, Grendelstrasse
- Schaffhausen — Unterstadt, Vordergasse, Vorstadt
- St. Gallen — Multergasse, Marktgasse, Neugasse, Spisergasse, Marktplatz
- St. Moritz — Via Serlas, Via Maistra
- Winterthur — Untertor, Marktgasse
- Zermatt — Bahnhofstrasse
- Zurich — Bahnhofstrasse, Rennweg, Strehl-/Storchengasse, Löwenstrasse, Limmatquai, Niederdorfstrasse, Europaallee

=== Ukraine ===
- Kyiv — Khreschatyk
- Lviv — Freedom Prospect, Market square
- Odesa — Deribasivska street, Richelievska street

=== United Kingdom ===
==== England ====
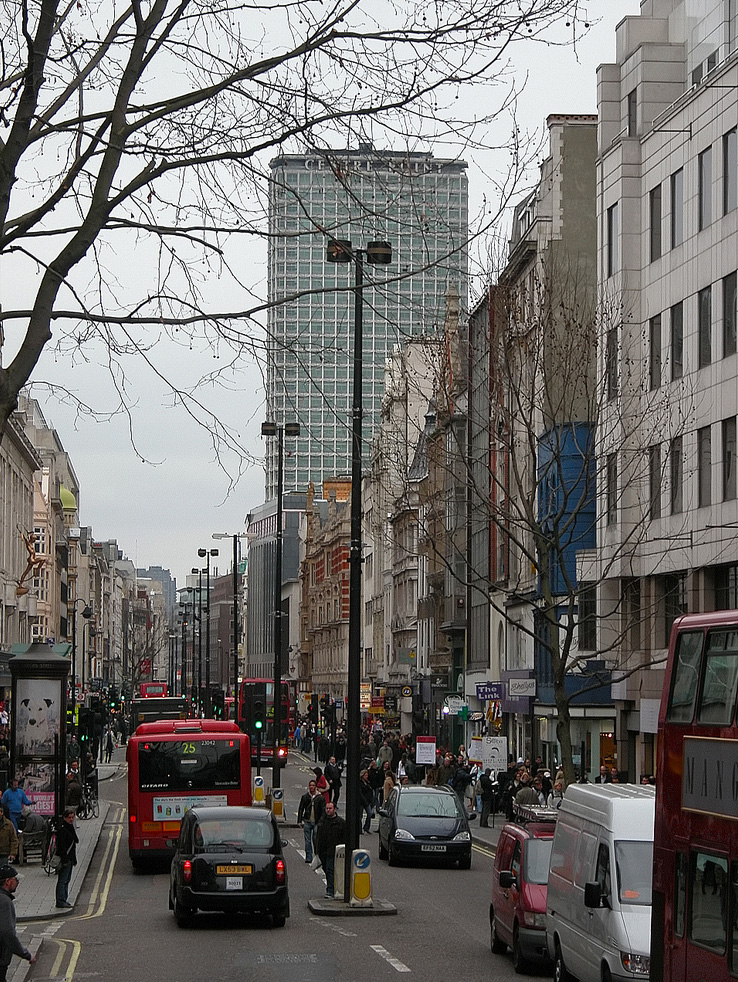
Oxford Street, London, United Kingdom

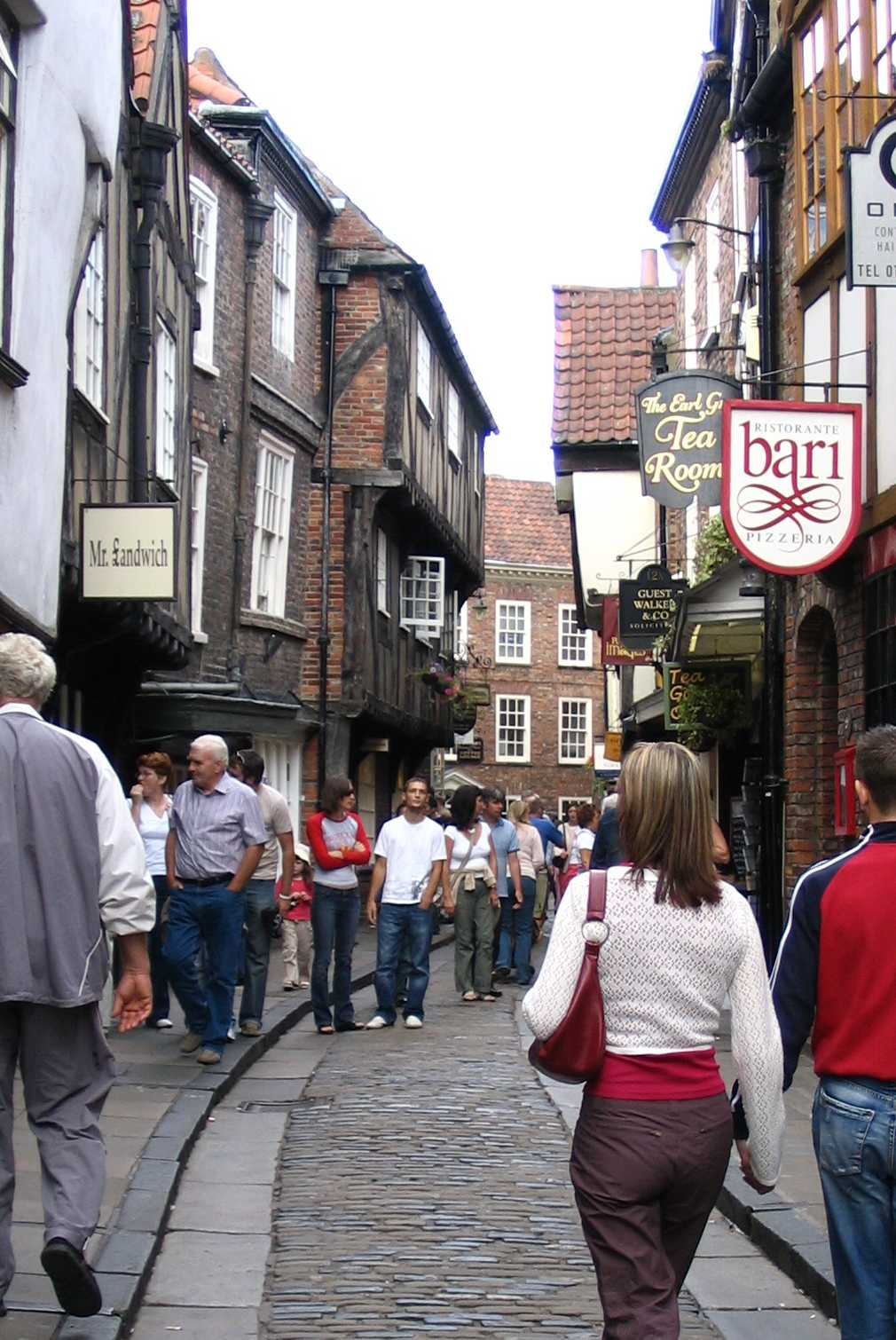
The Shambles, York, United Kingdom

- Bath — Burton Street, Milsom Street, New Bond Street, Old Bond Street, Stall Street, Southgate Street, SouthGate Place, Union Street
- Birkenhead — Grange Road, Borough Road, Woodchurch Road
- Birmingham — Corporation Street, New Street, Bullring, The Mailbox
- Brighton — The Lanes, North Laine
- Bristol — Broadmead, Queen's Promenade (Triangle), Whiteladies Road
- Canterbury — High Street
- Coventry — Smithford Way, The Precinct, Market Way, Hertford Street, Broadgate, Cross Cheaping, West Orchards, Cathedral Lanes
- Durham — Elvet Bridge, Saddler Street, Market Place, High Street (Prince Bishops Shopping Centre), Silver Street, The Gates Shopping Centre
- Kingston upon Hull — Prospect Street, the Prospect Centre, Paragon Street, Carr Lane, Whitefriargate
- Leeds — Victoria, Briggate, Kirkgate Market, King Edward Street, The Headrow, Trinity, White Rose, Leeds Dock
- Leicester — Belvoir Street, Gallowtree Gate, High Street, Humberstone Gate, Silver Street
- Liverpool — Bold Street, Church Street, Lord Street, Williamson Square, Liverpool One Area (including Paradise Street, Peter's Lane and South John Street), Whitechapel, Castle Street
- London — West End shopping district (including Bond Street, Oxford Street, Savile Row, Jermyn Street, Piccadilly and Regent Street), Knightsbridge area (including Sloane Street), Kings Road, Covent Garden area (including Neal Street, Long Acre and Seven Dials), Notting Hill (including Westbourne Grove), Royal Exchange
- Manchester — Market Street, Oldham Street, King Street, Deansgate, Exchange Square, New Cathedral Street
- Newcastle upon Tyne — Northumberland Street, Grainger Town
- Nottingham — Bridlesmith Gate
- Oxford — Cornmarket Street, Clarendon Shopping Centre, Golden Cross, High Street, Queen Street, Westgate Oxford, Broad Street
- Sheffield — Devonshire Quarter, Fargate, The Moor, Meadowhall Centre
- Southampton — Westquay
- Swindon — The Parade, Regent Street
- York — The Shambles

==== Northern Ireland ====
- Belfast — Royal Avenue, High Street, Donegall Place

==== Scotland ====
- Aberdeen — Union Street
- Edinburgh — Multrees Walk, George Street, Princes Street, St James Centre
- Glasgow — Buchanan Street, Argyle Street, Sauchiehall Street, Princes Square, Merchant City district including Ingram Street
- Perth — High Street

==== Wales ====
- Cardiff — Queen Street, St. Mary Street/High Street, The Hayes
- Newport — Commercial Street
- Swansea — Oxford Street

== North America ==
=== Canada ===
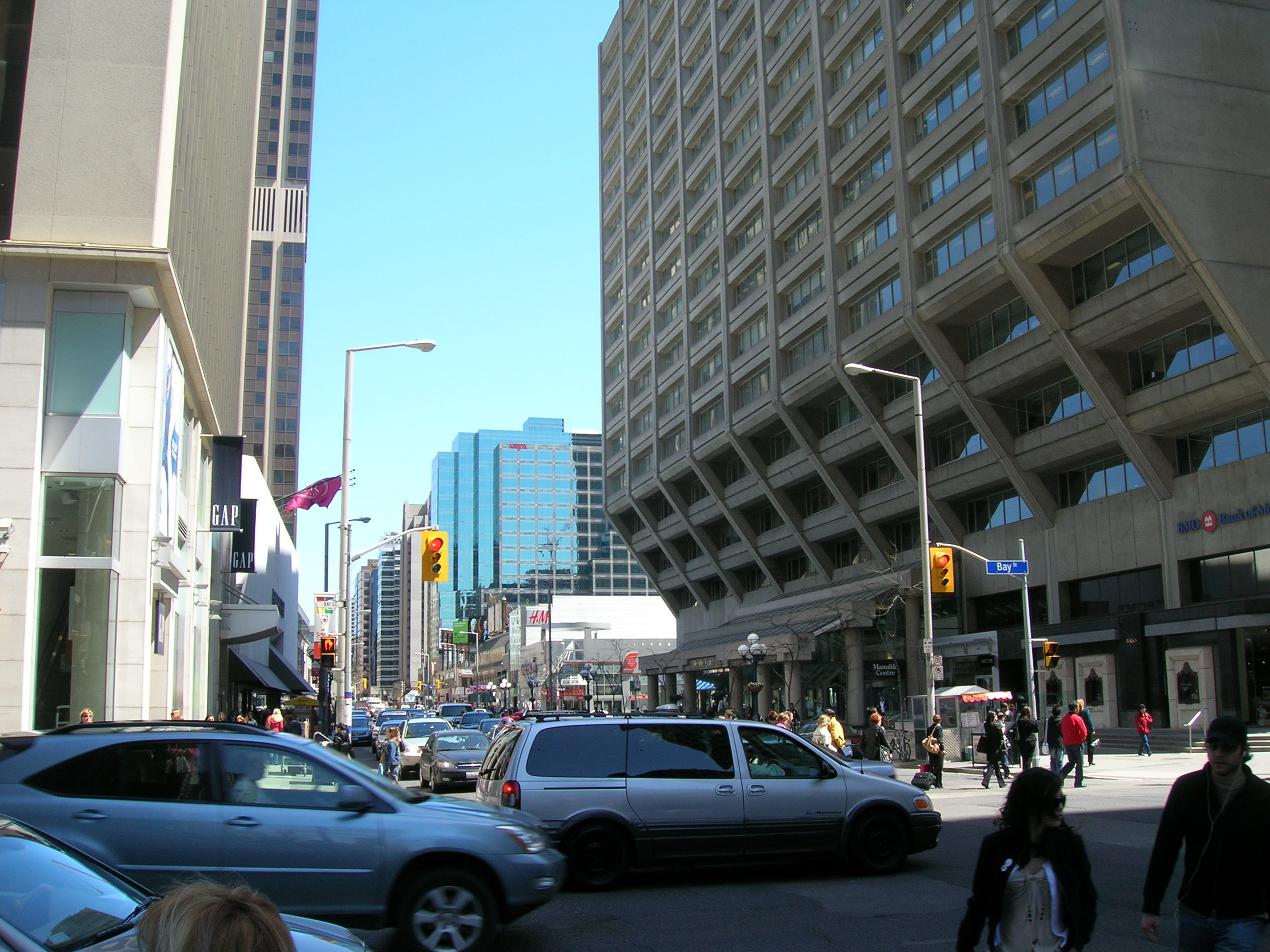
Bloor Street in Toronto

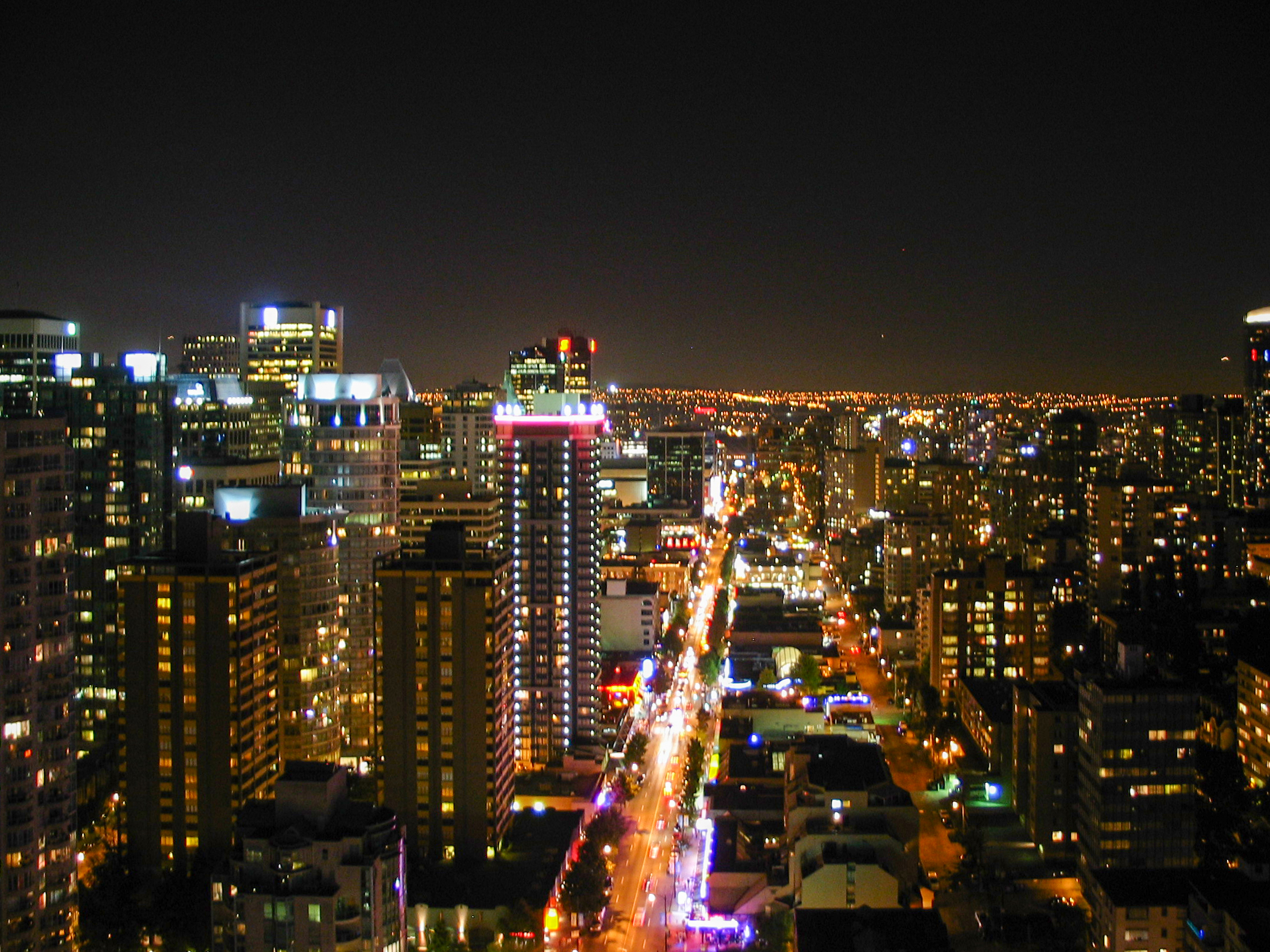
Vancouver's bustling night scene along Robson and Alberni Streets

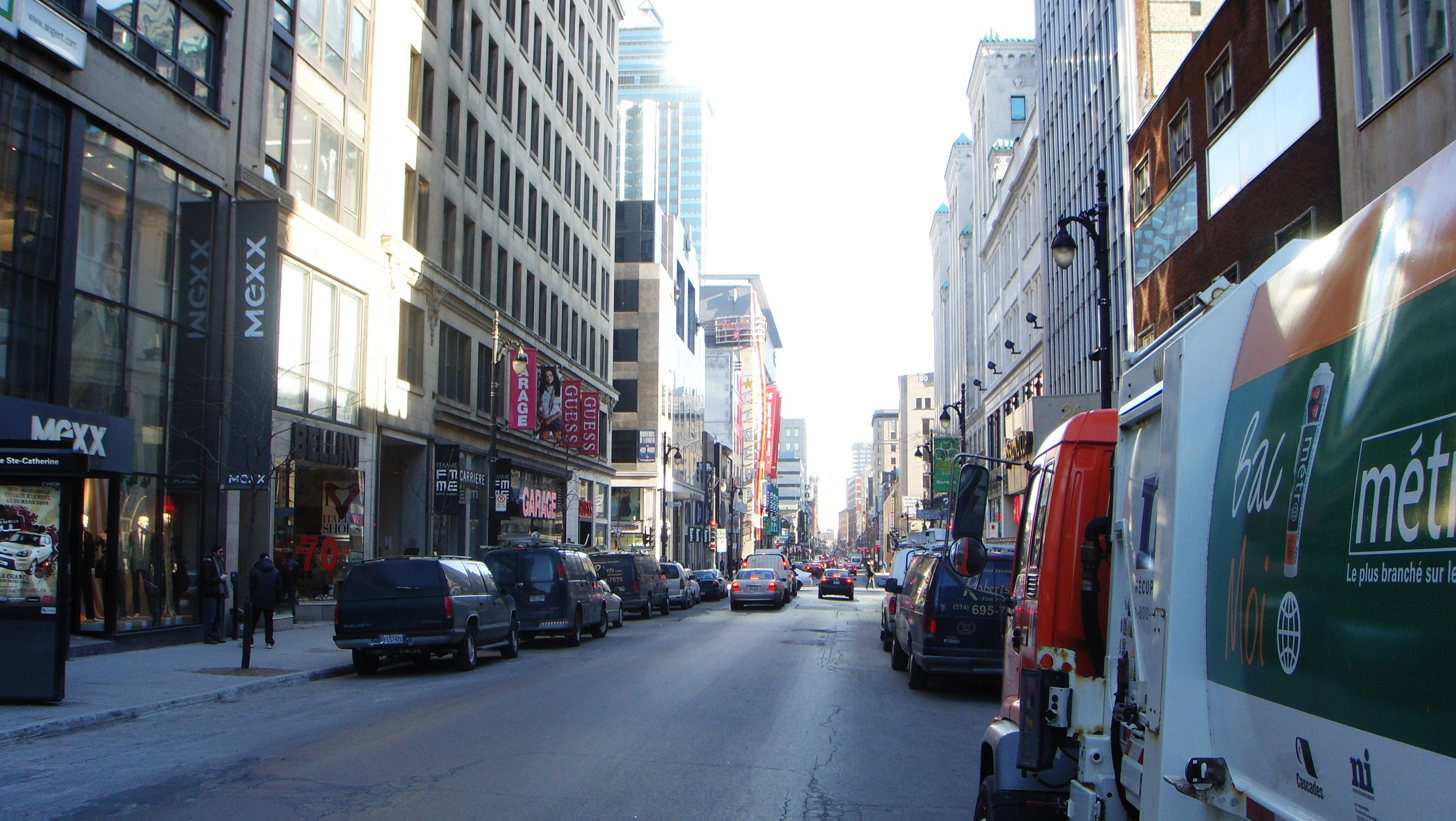
Saint Catherine Street in Montreal

Alberta

- Calgary — Stephen Avenue, Uptown 17th Avenue, Kensington, Marda Loop, Downtown East Village
- Edmonton — Whyte Avenue, Ice District, South Edmonton Common

British Columbia

- Langley — Glover Road (in Fort Langley)
- Vancouver — Alberni District, Broadway (Midtown), Burrard Street, Commercial Drive, Cambie Street, Davie Village, Granville District, Granville Island, Kitsilano, Robson Street, SOMA, Uptown
- Victoria — LoJo (Lower Johnson)
- Whistler — Village Stroll

Manitoba

- Winnipeg — Exchange District, Osborne Village, St. James Street

Nova Scotia

- Halifax — Spring Garden Road

Ontario

- Hamilton — Hess Village
- London — Richmond Row
- Ottawa — Bank Street, Byward Market, Elgin Street, Rideau Street, Sussex Drive, Wellington West, Westboro
- Toronto — Downtown Yonge, Fashion District, Gerrard India Bazaar, Kensington Market, Midtown Toronto, Mink Mile (Bloor Street), Orfus Road, Queen West, Roncesvalles, Yorkville

Quebec

- Montreal — Golden Square Mile, Mount Royal Avenue, Saint Catherine Street, Saint Denis Street, Saint Laurent Boulevard
- Quebec City — Saint Jean Street, Saint Joseph Street, Grande Alley, Cartier Avenue, Laurier Boulevard

=== Costa Rica ===
- Escazú — Avenida Escazu, Guachipelín, Multiplaza Escazu
- San José — Avenida Central, Rohrmoser

=== Dominican Republic ===
- Santiago de los Caballeros — Avenida Juan Pablo Duarte, La Esmeralda, Los Jardines Metropolitanos
- Santo Domingo — Avenida Winston Churchill, Piantini

=== Guatemala ===
- Guatemala City — Avenida Reforma, Zona Viva, Cuatro Grados Norte

=== Mexico ===
- Acapulco — Avenida Costera Miguel Alemán, Acapulco Diamante, Acapulco Dorado, Marqués Port, Pichilingue
- Cancún — Kukulcán Avenue
- Guadalajara — Andares, Puerta de Hierro
- Los Cabos — La Marina
- Mexico City — Paseo de la Reforma, Avenida Presidente Masaryk, Francisco I. Madero Avenue, Nuevo Polanco, Altavista Street, Santa Fe
- Monterrey — Calzada del Valle
- Puebla — Angelópolis, Zavaleta/La Noria, Las Animas, La Paz/La Calera
- Tuxtla Gutiérrez — Boulevard Belisario Domínguez, Boulevard Ángel Albino Corzo

=== Panama ===
- Panama City — Calle 50, Soho Mall, Multiplaza, Punta Pacifica

=== United States ===
==== Alabama ====
- Birmingham — Summit Boulevard, Galleria Boulevard

==== Arizona ====
- Phoenix — Camelback Road
- Prescott — Montezuma Street
- Scottsdale — Downtown Scottsdale, North Scottsdale Road
- Tempe — Mill Avenue
- Tucson — East Skyline Drive, Fourth Avenue, Crossroads Festival

==== Arkansas ====
- Little Rock — Markham Avenue, Chenal Boulevard

==== California ====
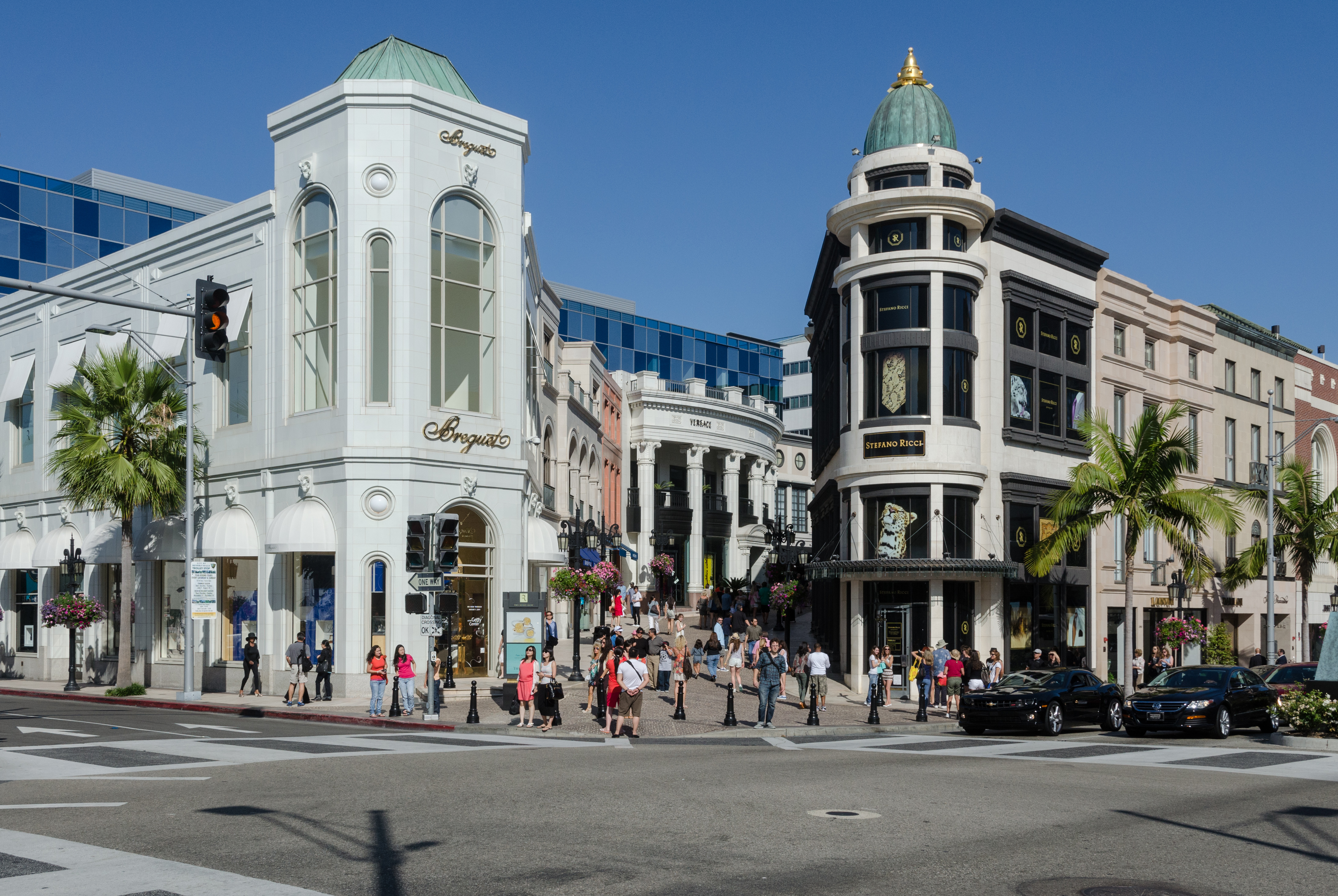
Rodeo Drive in Beverly Hills

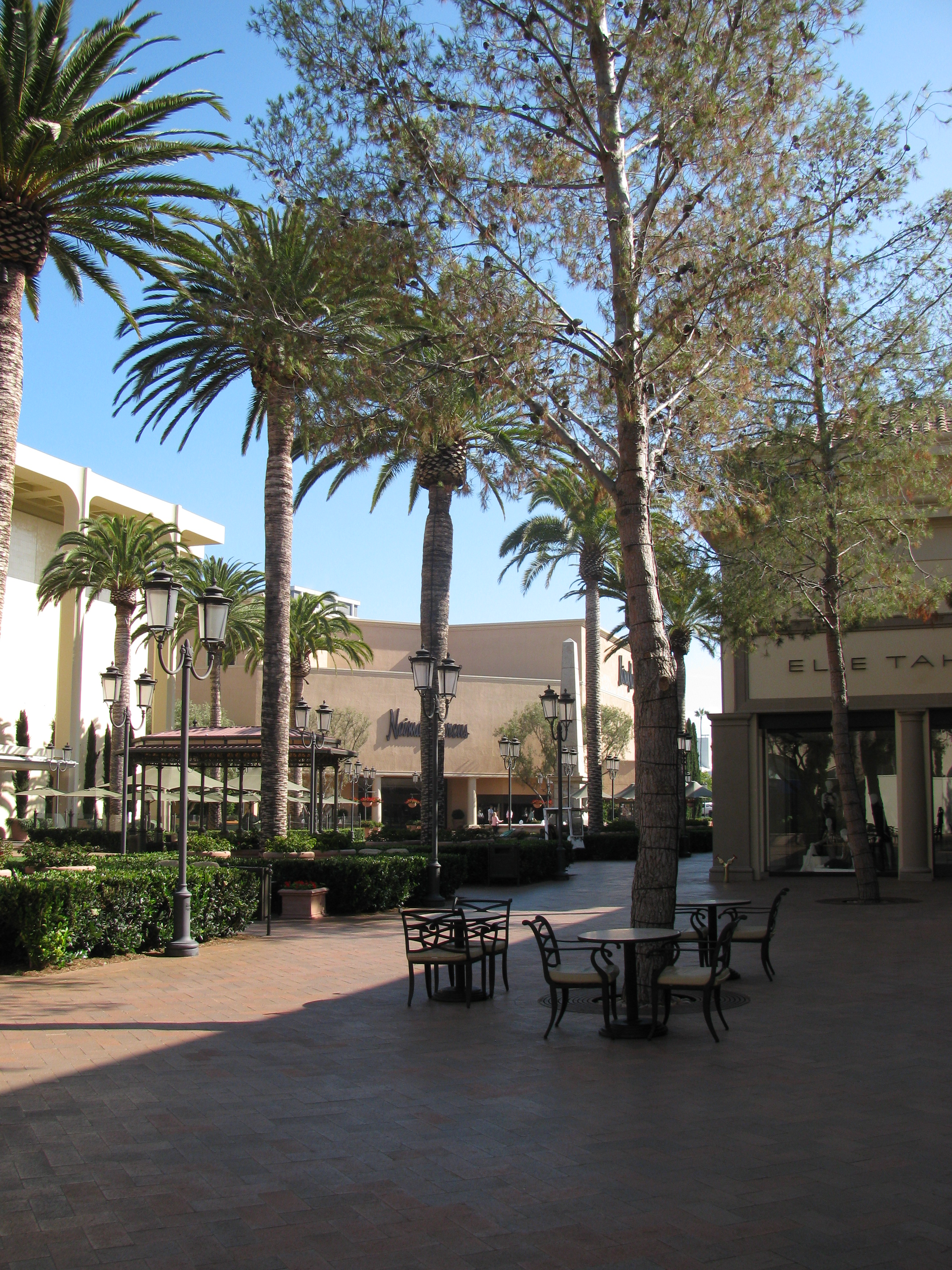
Fashion Island in Newport Beach

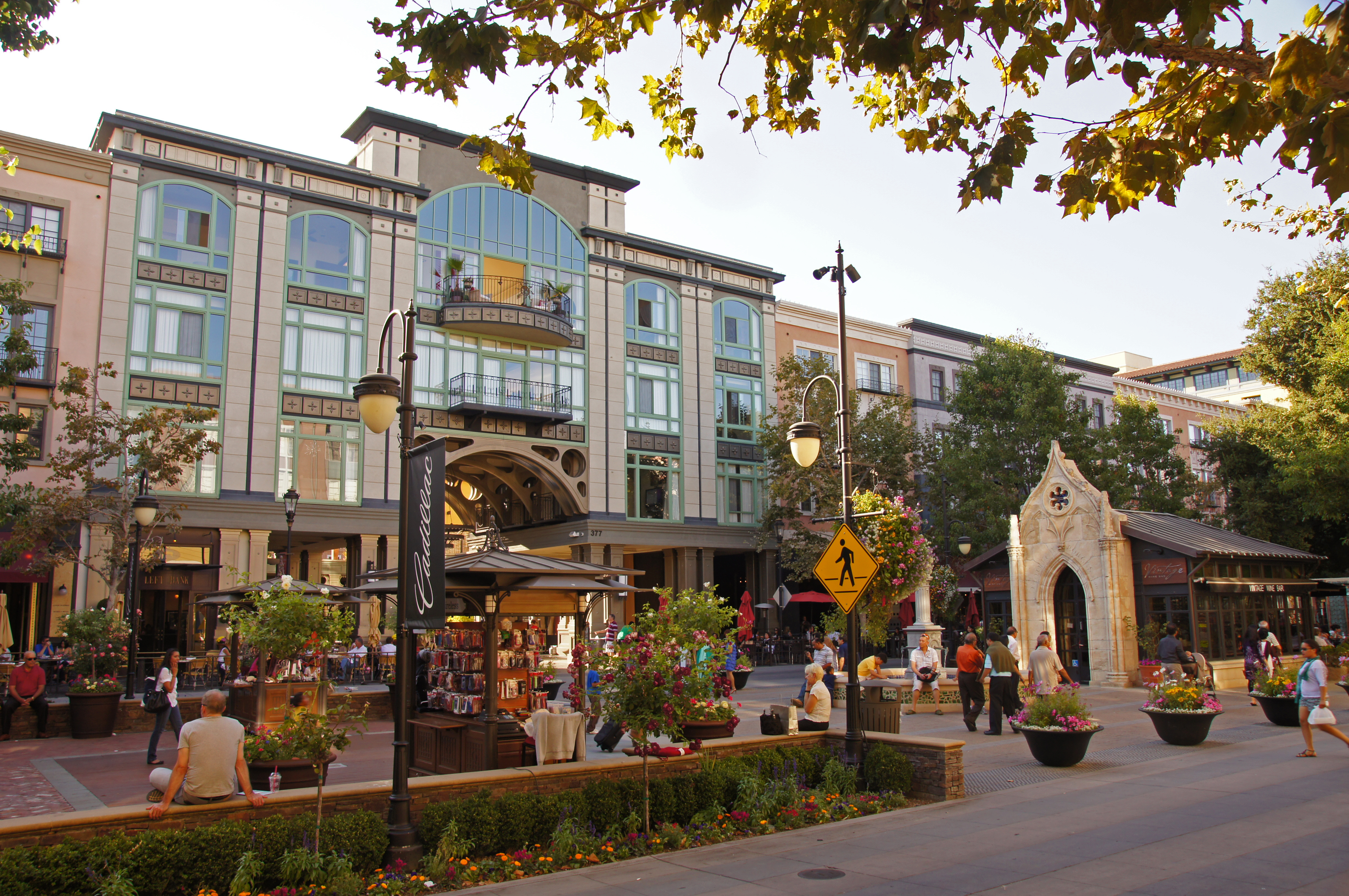
Santana Row in San Jose, California

- Berkeley — 4th Street, Shattuck Avenue, Solano Avenue, Telegraph Avenue
- Beverly Hills — Rodeo Drive, Beverly Drive
- Burlingame — Burlingame Avenue
- Carmel — Ocean Avenue
- Costa Mesa — South Coast Metro, South Coast Plaza
- Glendale — North Brand Boulevard
- Grass Valley — Mill Street
- Laguna Beach — Forest Avenue
- Los Angeles — Abbot Kinney Boulevard, Melrose Avenue, Hollywood Boulevard, Sunset Strip, Fairfax District, Miracle Mile, Robertson Boulevard, Sawtelle Boulevard, Sawtelle Japantown, Wilshire Boulevard, Ventura Boulevard, Van Nuys Boulevard
- Los Gatos — Santa Cruz Avenue
- Newport Beach — Newport Center
- Oakland — College Avenue, Piedmont Avenue
- Palm Desert — El Paseo
- Palo Alto — University Avenue, Stanford Shopping Center
- Pasadena — Old Town Pasadena
- Placerville — Main Street
- Roseville — Galleria at Roseville
- Sacramento — Downtown Commons, Arden Fair
- Santa Clarita — Old Town Newhall, Westfield Valencia Town Center
- San Diego — Ocean Beach Antique District, Gaslamp Quarter
- San Francisco — Union Square, Union Street, Market Street, Chestnut Street, Haight-Ashbury, Fillmore Street, Hayes Street
- San Jose — The Alameda, Santana Row, Stevens Creek Boulevard
- Santa Barbara — State Street
- Santa Monica — Montana Avenue, Third Street Promenade, Main Street

==== Colorado ====
- Aspen — Galena Street
- Boulder — Pearl Street Mall
- Denver — 16th Street Mall, LoDo, Cherry Creek

==== Connecticut ====
- Greenwich — Greenwich Avenue
- West Hartford, Connecticut -Blue Back Square
- Westport — Main Street

==== Delaware ====
- Bethany Beach — The Boardwalk, Garfield Parkway
- Lewes — 2nd Street, Front Street
- Newark — East Main Street
- Rehoboth Beach — Rehoboth Avenue, The Boardwalk, Delaware Route 1
- Wilmington — Riverfront, Route 202, W 11th Street

==== Florida ====
- Aventura — Aventura Mall
- Bal Harbour — Bal Harbour Shops
- Coral Gables — Miracle Mile
- Delray Beach — Atlantic Avenue
- Boca Raton — Mizner Park
- Ft. Lauderdale — Las Olas
- Miami — Miami Design District, Coconut Grove, CocoWalk, Flagler Street, Miami Jewelry District
- Miami Beach — Lincoln Road, Collins Avenue, Washington Avenue, Ocean Drive, Española Way, Alton Road
- Orlando — Disney Springs, International Drive, Universal CityWalk
- Naples — 5th Avenue South, Third Street South
- Palm Beach — Worth Avenue
- Tampa — Soho, Westshore
- West Palm Beach — Clematis Street, The Square
- Winter Park — Park Avenue

==== Georgia ====
- Atlanta — Luckie Marietta, Peachtree Street, Buckhead, Atlantic Station
- Dunwoody and Sandy Springs — Perimeter Center
- Savannah — Savannah Historic District, Abercorn Common, Abercorn Walk, Oglethorpe Mall

==== Hawaii ====
Gucci Store on Kalakaua Avenue, Waikiki, Hawaii

- Honolulu — Ala Moana, Kalakaua Avenue, Kuhio Avenue (Waikiki)

==== Idaho ====
- Boise — Downtown Boise, Hyde Park
- Caldwell — Indian Creek Plaza
- Meridian — The Village at Meridian
- Nampa — Historic Downtown Nampa

==== Illinois ====
- Chicago — Michigan Avenue (especially the Magnificent Mile), Oak Street, State Street, Wicker Park, Clybourn Corridor, Bucktown, Gold Coast, Lincoln Park, Six Corners
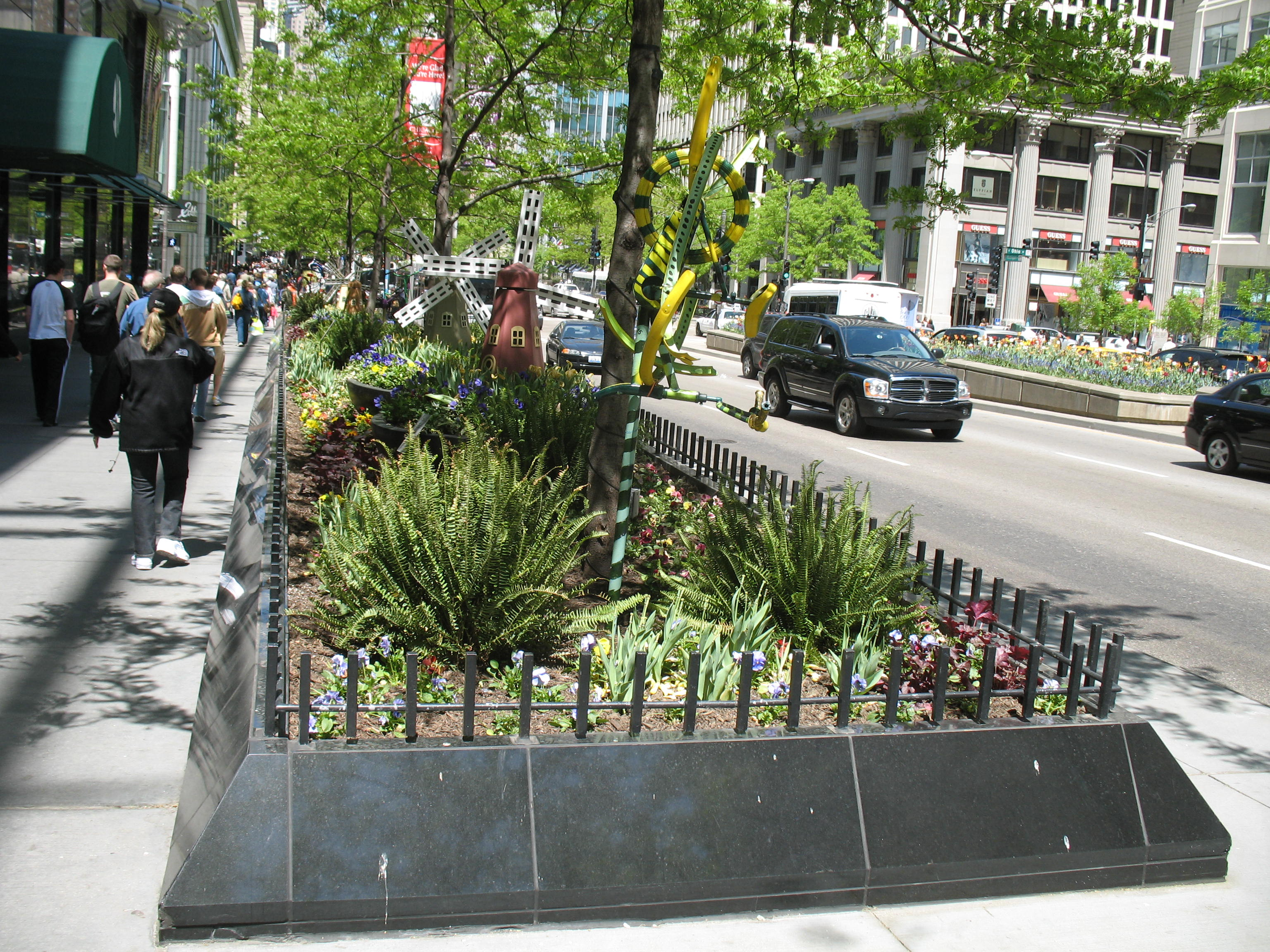
  Magnificent Mile in Chicago

==== Indiana ====
- Indianapolis — 82nd/86th Street Corridor, Massachusetts Avenue, Virginia Avenue

==== Kansas ====
- Kansas City — Village West
- Lawrence — Massachusetts Street
- Manhattan — Aggieville
- Overland Park — Santa Fe Drive
- Wichita — Old Town

==== Kentucky ====
- Louisville — Oxmoor Mall, The Paddock Shops
- Lexington — Fayette Mall

==== Louisiana ====
- New Orleans — Royal Street, Magazine Street, Canal Street

==== Maryland ====
- Annapolis — Main Street
- Baltimore — Fells Point, Harbor East, Aliceanna Street
- Chevy Chase — Wisconsin Avenue

==== Massachusetts ====
- Boston — Newbury Street, Boylston Street, Copley Square, Downtown Crossing, Charles Street
- Cambridge — Harvard Square, Central Square, Inman Square
- Somerville — Davis Square, Union Square, Assembly Square

==== Michigan ====
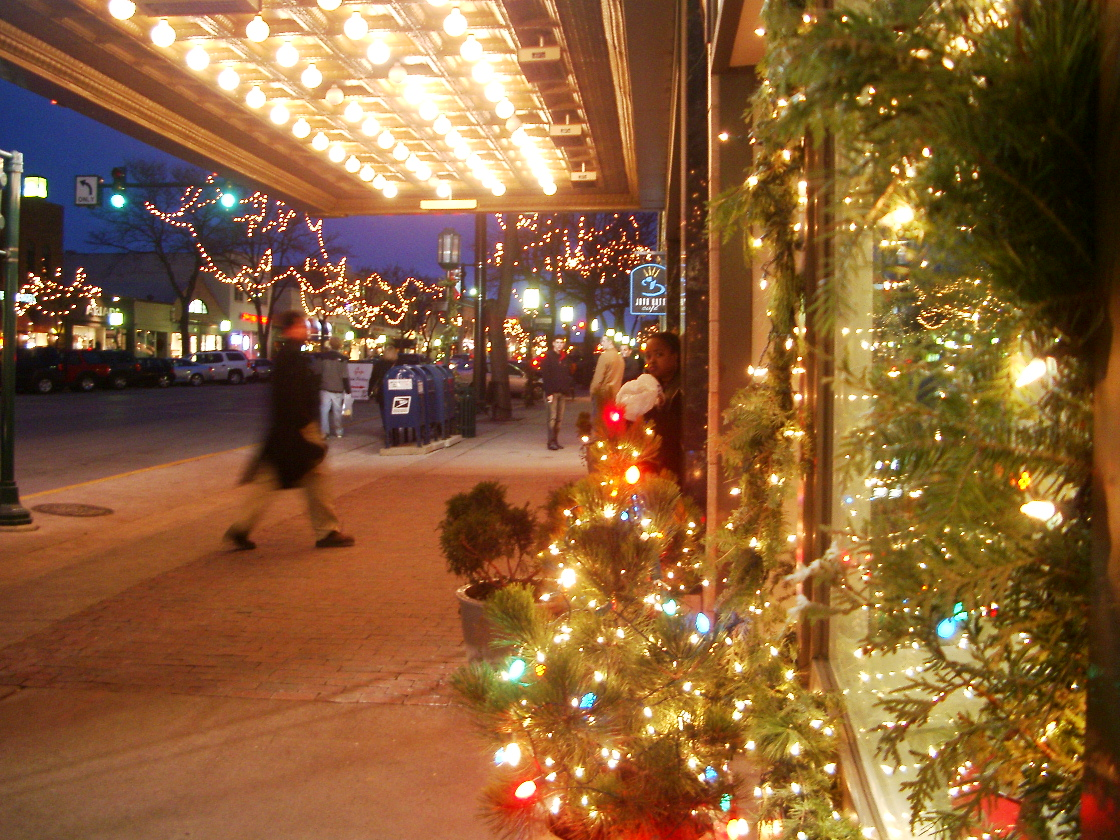
Birmingham, Michigan

- Detroit — Lower Woodward Avenue, Greektown, Eastern Market
- Birmingham — Old Woodward Avenue
- Frankenmuth — South Main Street
- Grosse Pointe — The Village on Kercheval Avenue
- Rochester — Main Street
- Royal Oak — Main Street
- Northville — W. Main Street
- Plymouth — Main Street
- Traverse City — Front Street

==== Minnesota ====
- Duluth — Superior Street
- Edina — 50th & France
- Minneapolis — Nicollet Mall, North Loop, Uptown
- St. Paul — Grand Avenue
- Wayzata — Lake Street

==== Missouri ====
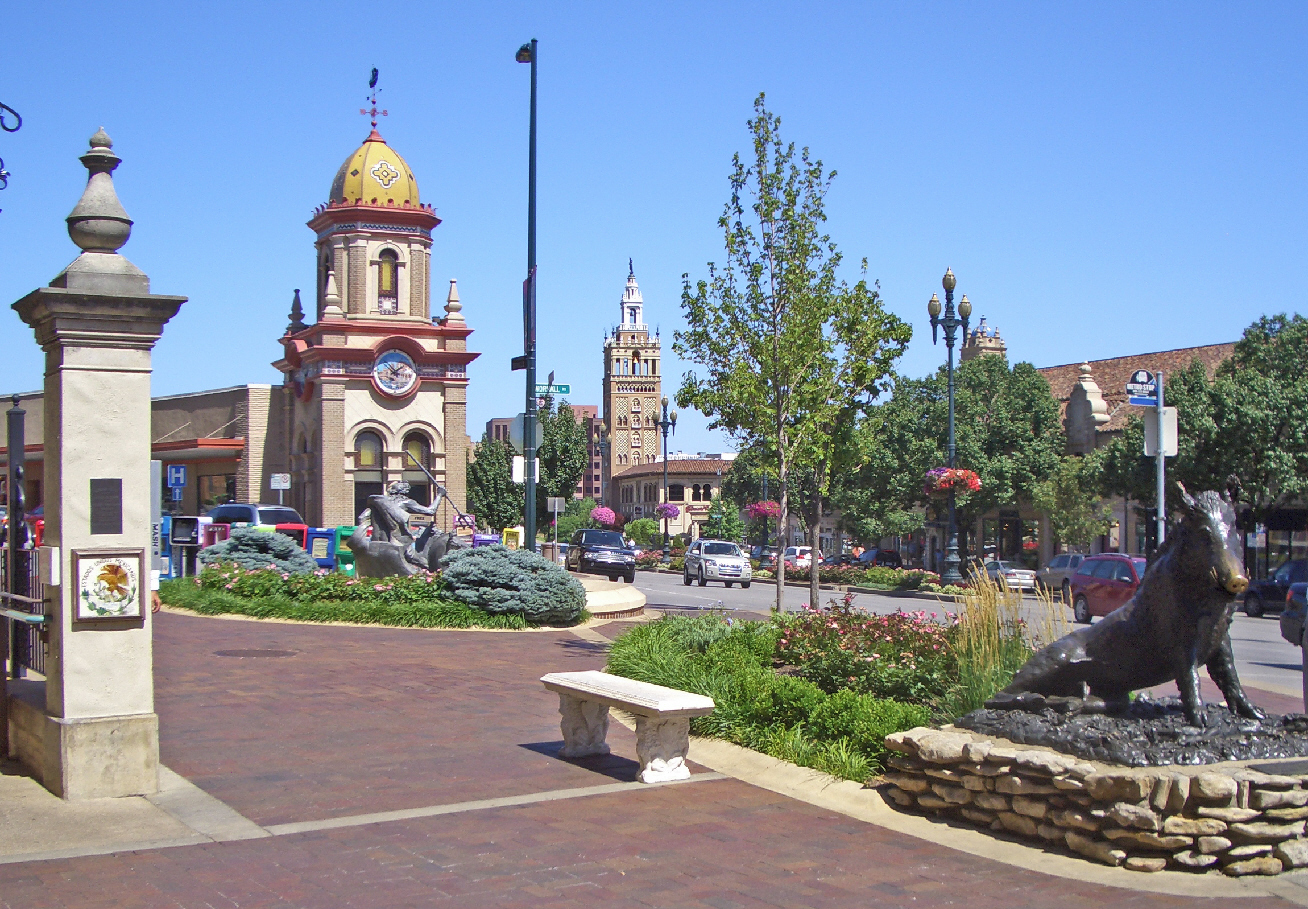
The Country Club Plaza, Kansas City, MO

- Branson — 76 Country Boulevard
- Clayton — Central Business District
- Kansas City — Country Club Plaza
- Saint Charles — Main Street
- Saint Louis — Central West End, South Grand, U City Loop, Cherokee Street

==== Nebraska ====
- Omaha — The Old Market
- Lincoln — "O" Street

==== Nevada ====
- Las Vegas — Las Vegas Strip
- Reno — Virginia Street
- Sparks — Victorian Square

==== New Jersey ====
- Collingswood — Haddon Avenue
- Haddonfield — Haddon Avenue, King's Highway
- Hudson County — Bergenline Avenue, Journal Square
- Atlantic City — The Walk (Atlantic, Arctic, Baltic, Michigan, and Arkansas Avenues)
- Montclair — Upper Montclair
- Princeton — Nassau Street
- Ridgewood — East Ridgewood Avenue
- Westfield — Downtown
- Englewood — North Dean Street

==== New Mexico ====
- Albuquerque — Uptown

==== New York ====
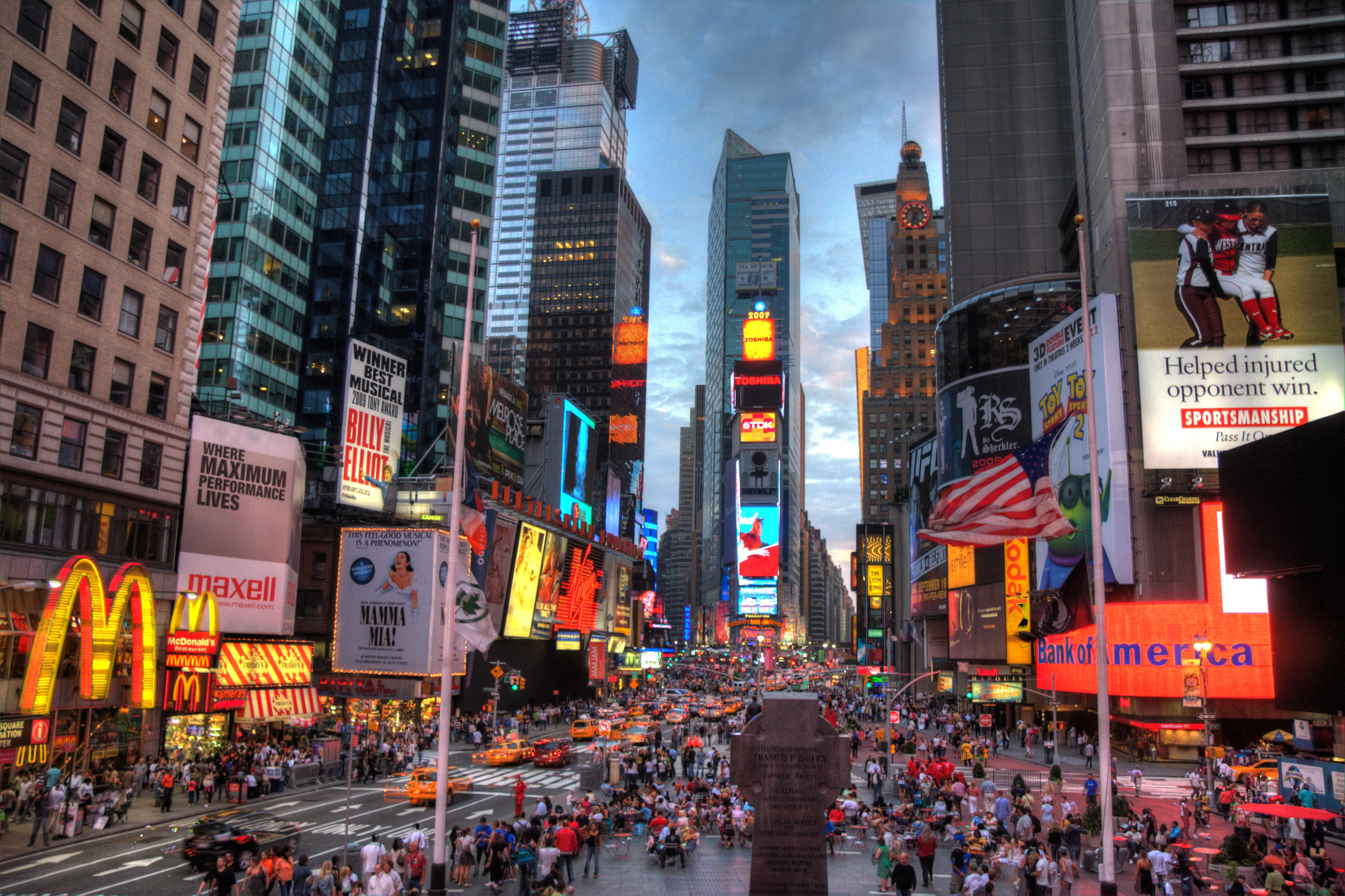
Times Square, New York City

- New York City — Times Square, Harlem - 125th Street, Fifth Avenue, Madison Avenue, 57th Street, Seventh Avenue, SoHo, West Village, South Street Seaport, Columbus Circle, Arthur Avenue, Fordham Road, The Hub, Bronx, Fulton Mall, Downtown Jamaica, Bell Boulevard, Manhattan Mall, Crown Heights-Utica Avenue, Pitkin Avenue (Brownsville, Brooklyn), King's Plaza, Gateway Center (Brooklyn)Flatbush Avenue, Roosevelt Avenue, Staten Island Mall, New Dorp, Staten Island, Empire Outlets, Port Richmond, Staten Island, Queens Boulevard, Queens Place Mall, Queens Center Mall
- Albany — Downtown, Central Avenue, Wolf Road, New Louden Road, Colonie Center, Stuyvesant Plaza
- Binghamton — Vestal Parkway
- Buffalo — Elmwood Avenue, BoHo, Hertel Avenue, Walden Galleria, Williamsville, Market Arcade
- Rochester — Park Avenue, Monroe Avenue, University Avenue
- Syracuse — Armory Square, Destiny USA
- Saratoga Springs — Broadway, Railroad Place
- White Plains — Galleria at White Plains, The Westchester, White Plains Mall, The Source at White Plains
- Yonkers -- Cross County Shopping Center
- Tarrytown—Main Street in Tarrytown
- Hempstead — Franklin Street, Main Street
- Garden City—Franklin Avenue, Roosevelt Field Mall
- Rockville Centre—North Village Avenue, North Park Avenue, Sunrise Highway, Merrick Road
- Farmingdale—Main Street
- Hicksville -- Broadway Mall, NY Route 107
- Manhasset -- Miracle Mile (Manhasset), Americana Manhasset
- Mineola—Mineola Blvd, Main Street, Jericho Turnpike
- Valley Stream -- Green Acres Mall, Rockaway Avenue, Merrick Road, Central Avenue
- Port Washington—Main Street
- Great Neck—Middle Neck Road, Great Neck Plaza, North Shore Shopping Mart
- Westbury—Post Avenue, The Mall at the Source, The Galley at Westbury Plaza
- Huntington—New York Avenue, NY Route 110, Walt Whitman Mall
- Patchogue -- Montauk Highway
- East Hampton — Main Street, Newtown Lane
- Southampton — Main Street Jobs Lane
- Lake Grove --Smith Haven Mall
- Bay Shore -- South Shore Mall
- Hudson—Warren Street

==== North Carolina ====
- Charlotte — SouthPark, Sharon Road, Northlake, Rea Road
- Raleigh — North Hills, Glenwood Avenue, Oberlin Road
- Greensboro — Friendly Avenue, Green Valley Road
- Winston-Salem — Stratford Road, Hanes Mall Boulevard
- Durham — Fayetteville Road, Southpoint
- Asheville — Biltmore Village, Tunnel Road
- Wilmington — Front Street, Mayfaire, Oleander Drive
- Greenville — Red Banks Road, Arlington Boulevard
- Chapel Hill/Carrboro — Franklin Street

==== Ohio ====
- Akron — West Market Street
- Cincinnati — Over the Rhine, 5th Street, Hyde Park Square, O'Bryonville, Montgomery Road (between Hartfield Place and Schoolhouse Lane)
- Cleveland — Euclid Avenue, Mayfield Road, Cedar Road, Chagrin Boulevard, Crocker Park, Great Northern Boulevard
- Columbus — New Bond Street, High Street, Lane Avenue, Polaris Parkway, Easton Town Center
- Toledo — Monroe Street, Fallen Timbers, Levis Commons
- Oxford — High Street

==== Oklahoma ====
- Edmond — Spring Creek, Broadway
- Oklahoma City — Automobile Alley, Classen Curve, Nichols Hills Plaza, Park Avenue, Plaza District, Uptown, Western Avenue
- Norman — Campus Corner
- Tulsa — Brookside, Utica Square, Cherry Street
- Broken Arrow — The Rose District

==== Oregon ====
- Bend — Old Mill District
- Portland — Northwest District, Pearl District, Pioneer Place

==== Pennsylvania ====
- Allentown — Hamilton District
- Chambersburg — Chambersburg Mall
- Harrisburg — SoMa District (Downtown)
- Lower Merion — Bala Village Shopping District, Suburban Square
- Philadelphia — Rittenhouse Square, Walnut Street, Old City, Fashion District
- Pittsburgh — Fifth & Forbes District of Downtown, Walnut Street and Ellsworth Avenue in Shadyside, Forbes Avenue in Squirrel Hill
- State College — Downtown/College Avenue
- Upper Merion — King of Prussia Mall

==== Rhode Island ====
- Providence — Westminster Street, Thayer Street, Wayland Square, Wickenden Street
- Newport — Thames Street

==== South Carolina ====
- Charleston — King Street
- Myrtle Beach — Broadway at the Beach and Barefoot Landing
- Greenville, SC — Main Street

==== Tennessee ====
- Gatlinburg — US 441 Parkway
- Knoxville — Cumberland Avenue, Old City, Kingston Pike, Parkside Drive
- Nashville — Green Hills, The Gulch, Rivergate
- Memphis — Peabody Place, Poplar Avenue
- Pigeon Forge — Dolly Parton Parkway
- Sevierville — Dolly Parton Parkway

==== Texas ====
- Austin — 2nd Street District, South Congress, The Domain, Sixth Street, Rainey Street
- Dallas — The Knox District, West Village, Victory Park, Uptown Dallas, Highland Park Village, Northpark Center, Deep Ellum Galleria Dallas District, Preston Center, Snyder Plaza
- El Paso — The Fountains at Farah
- Fort Worth — Camp Bowie Boulevard, Sundance Square, West 7th Street
- Galveston — Strand Historic District
- Houston — Westheimer Road, Uptown Houston, Rice Village, Upper Kirby, Highland Village, CityCentre, GreenStreet, Memorial City District, West Avenue, Harwin Drive, Downtown Houston, Uptown Park, BLVD Place, River Oaks District
- San Antonio — San Antonio River Walk, The Shops at La Cantera, North Star Mall

==== Utah ====
- Park City — Main Street
- Provo — Center Street
- St. George — St. George Boulevard, Main Street
- Salt Lake City — Main Street, Sugar House, Gateway District, 9th and 9th

==== Virginia ====
- Alexandria — King Street in Old Town Alexandria
- Arlington — Wilson and Clarendon Boulevards in Clarendon, Pentagon City
- Bristol - State Street
- Fairfax County — Tysons Corner, Reston Town Center, Fair Oaks
- Richmond — Carytown, Stony Point Fashion Park
- Virginia Beach — Town Center, Lynnhaven

==== Washington ====
- Bellingham — Railroad Avenue, Fairhaven
- Bellevue — Bellevue Square, Old Bellevue Main Street, The Shops at The Bravern
- Seattle — Westlake Center and 5th Avenue, Broadway and Pike/Pine in Capitol Hill, First Avenue in Belltown, The Ave in the University District. Market Street and Ballard Avenue in Ballard, Fremont, The Junction in West Seattle, Phinney/Greenwood, Columbia City, Pioneer Square
- Tacoma — Sixth Avenue, Pacific Avenue
- Port Townsend — Water Street
- Kirkland — Lake Street, The Village at Totem Lake

==== Washington, D.C. ====
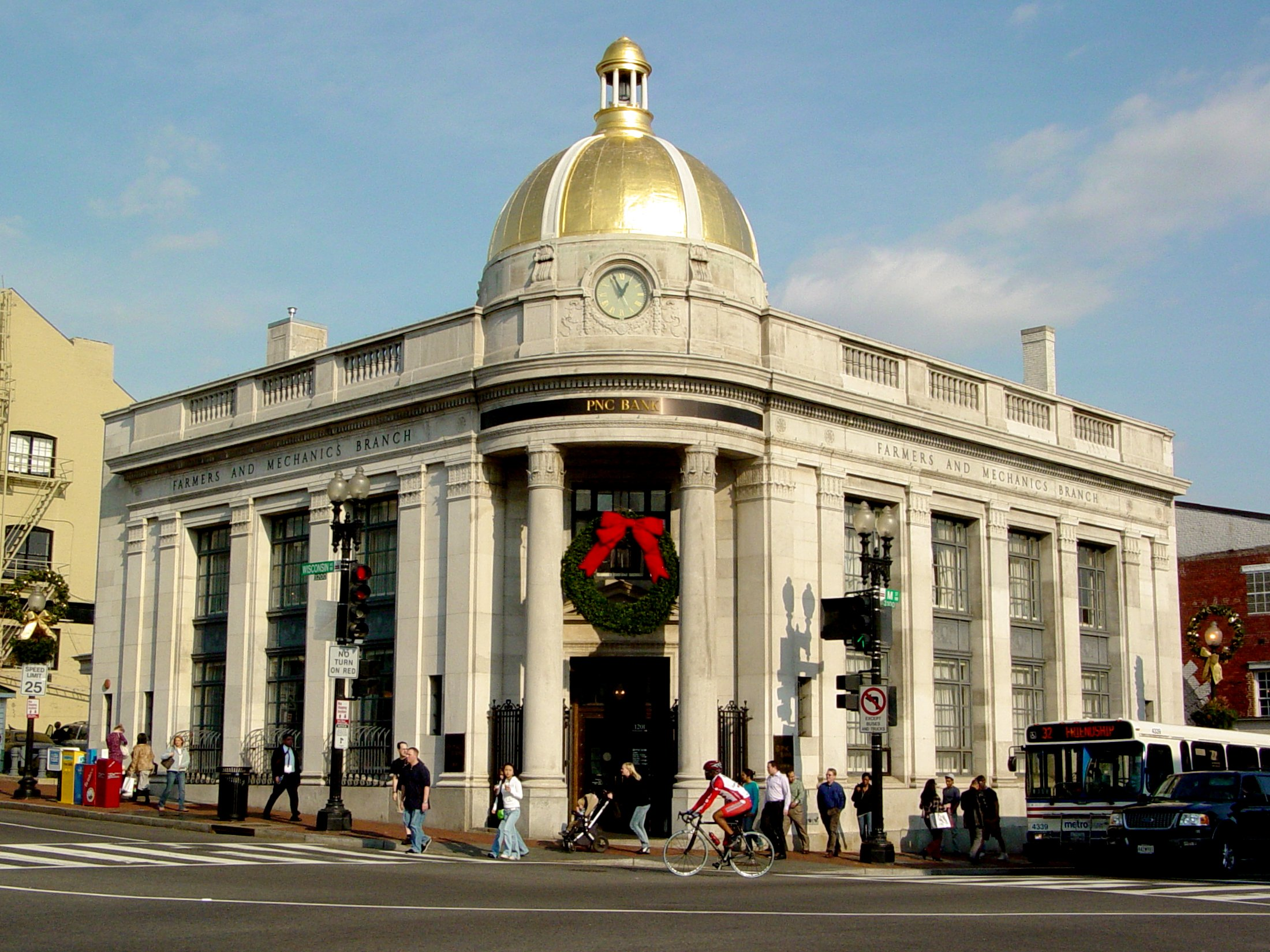
Georgetown, Washington, D.C.

- Chinatown — H & I Streets between 5th & 8th Streets, Gallery Place Metro Station
- Dupont Circle — Connecticut Avenue
- Georgetown — Wisconsin Avenue & M Street, and Washington Harbour at K Street NW between 30th and 31st Streets
- Friendship Heights — Wisconsin Avenue near Maryland state line
- Penn Quarter — F Street NW, between 5th & 10th Streets

==== Wisconsin ====
- Madison — State Street
- Milwaukee — Historic Third Ward
- Wisconsin Dells — Broadway, Outlets at the Dells

== South America ==
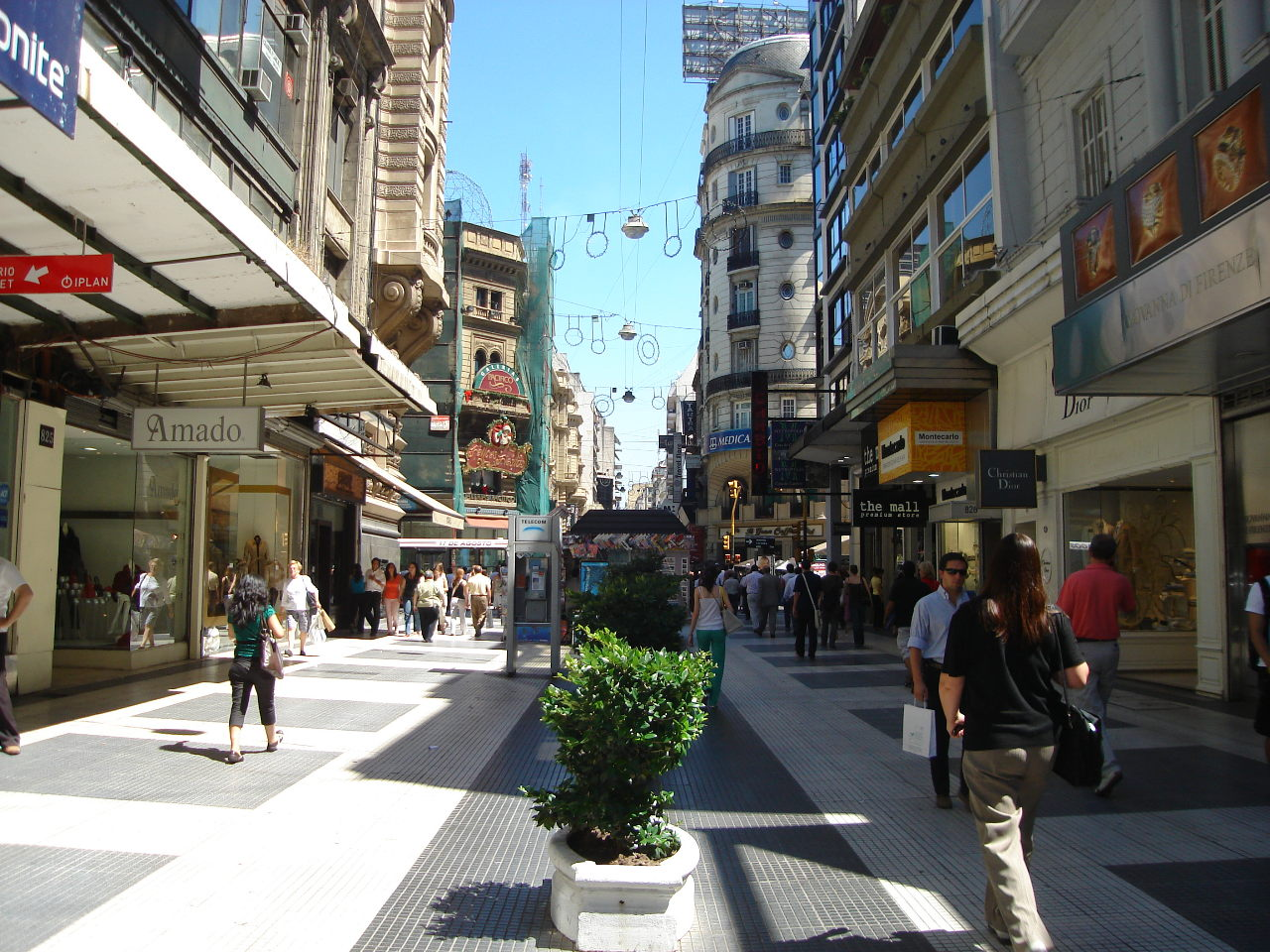
Florida Street, Buenos Aires

=== Argentina ===
- Buenos Aires — Palermo, Puerto Madero, Recoleta, Florida Street, Avenida Santa Fe, Avenida Alvear, Córdoba Avenue
- Córdoba — 9 de Julio Street, Rafael Núñez Avenue, Recta Martinolli Avenue, Vélez Sarsfield Avenue
- Rosario — Cordoba Street
- Mar del Plata — Güemes Street

=== Brazil ===
- Botucatu — Rua Amando de Barros, Avenida Vital Brasil
- Curitiba — Centro Rua XV de Novembro, Avenida do Batel, Rua Comendador Araújo, Al. Dr. Carlos de Carvalho
- Rio de Janeiro — Centro, Copacabana, Ipanema, Botafogo, Leblon, Barra da Tijuca, Bonsucesso, Tijuca, Penha, Madureira, Bangu, Campo Grande, Taquara, Freguesia, Avenida Ataulfo de Paiva, Rua Visconde de Pirajá, Avenida Nossa Senhora de Copacabana, Avenida Rio Branco, Rua Garcia d'Ávila, Rua Barata Ribeiro, Rua Voluntários da Pátria, Rua do Catete, Rua Cardoso de Morais, Rua dos Romeiros, Rua Dias da Cruz, Avenida Ministro Edgar Romero, Estrada do Portela, Rua da Alfândega, Rua Buenos Aires, Rua Conde de Bonfim, Boulevard 28 de Setembro, Avenida Cesário de Melo, Avenida Cônego Vasconcelos, Rua Coronel Agostinho
- São Paulo — Brás, Bom Retiro, Cerqueira César, Avenida Paulista, Rua Oscar Freire, Rua Bela Cintra, Rua Haddock Lobo Rua João Cachoeira, Rua Voluntários da Pátria, Rua Augusta, Rua Bresser
- Vitoria — Avenida Chapot Presvot, Aleixo Neto, Princesa Isabel

=== Bolivia ===
- La Paz — San Miguel neighborhood (mainly Montenegro Av./21st Street)
- Santa Cruz de la Sierra — Equipetrol (Aka "Fashion Street")

=== Chile ===
- Santiago — Alonso de Córdova Avenue, Isidora Goyenechea, Nueva Costanera

=== Colombia ===
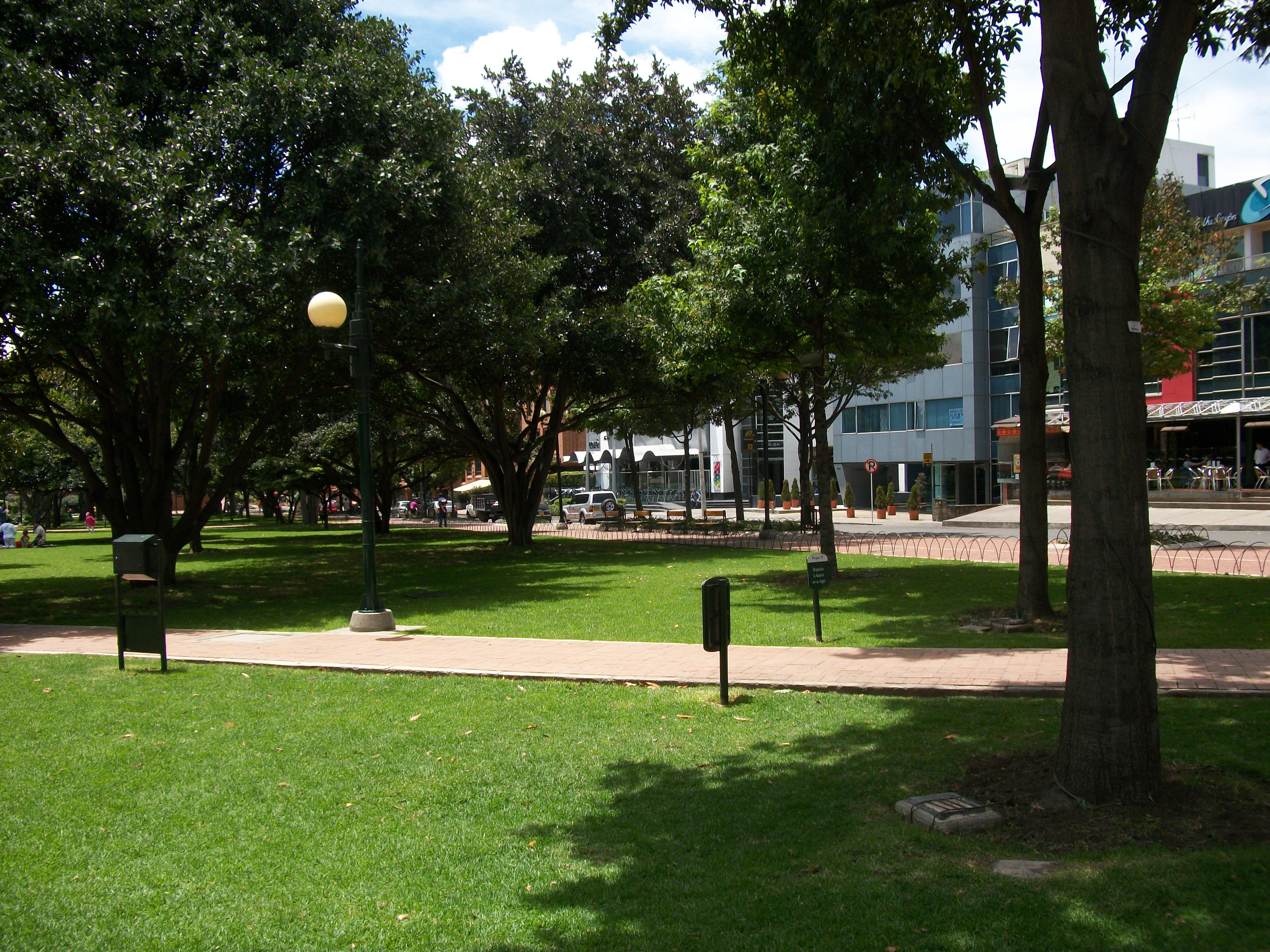
93 Park

Amazonian Region

- Leticia — Three Boundaries Square, Brazil Boundary
- Florencia — Bello Horizonte Neighborhood

Andean Region

- Bogotá — 93 Park, 7th Av, 15th Av, 116th Av, 119th Av, 122nd Av, 11th Av, Zona T, Zona Rosa, Centro Andino
- Medellín — Via Primavera, El Poblado
- Pereira — Circunvalar Ave, 6th Ave
- Manizales — 22nd Ave, 23rd Ave
- Armenia, Quindio — Bolivar Ave, Zona Norte
- Bucaramanga — San Pío Park, Cabecera
- Cucuta — Venezuela Boundary, Ventura Plaza

Caribbean Region

- Cartagena de Indias — Downtown, San Martín Ave, Bocagrande
- Barranquilla — Paseo Bolivar
- Montería — Ronda del Sinú Lineal Park
- Valledupar — Alfonso Lopez Square
- Sincelejo — Majagual Square
- Riohacha — Beach Pier
- Santa Marta — El Rodadero
- Maicao — Street 16
- Mompox — Mompox Plaza

Insular Region

- North End — Colombia Ave, Colón Ave

Orinoquia Region

- Villavicencio — Urban Spring Square
- Yopal — Iguana Park

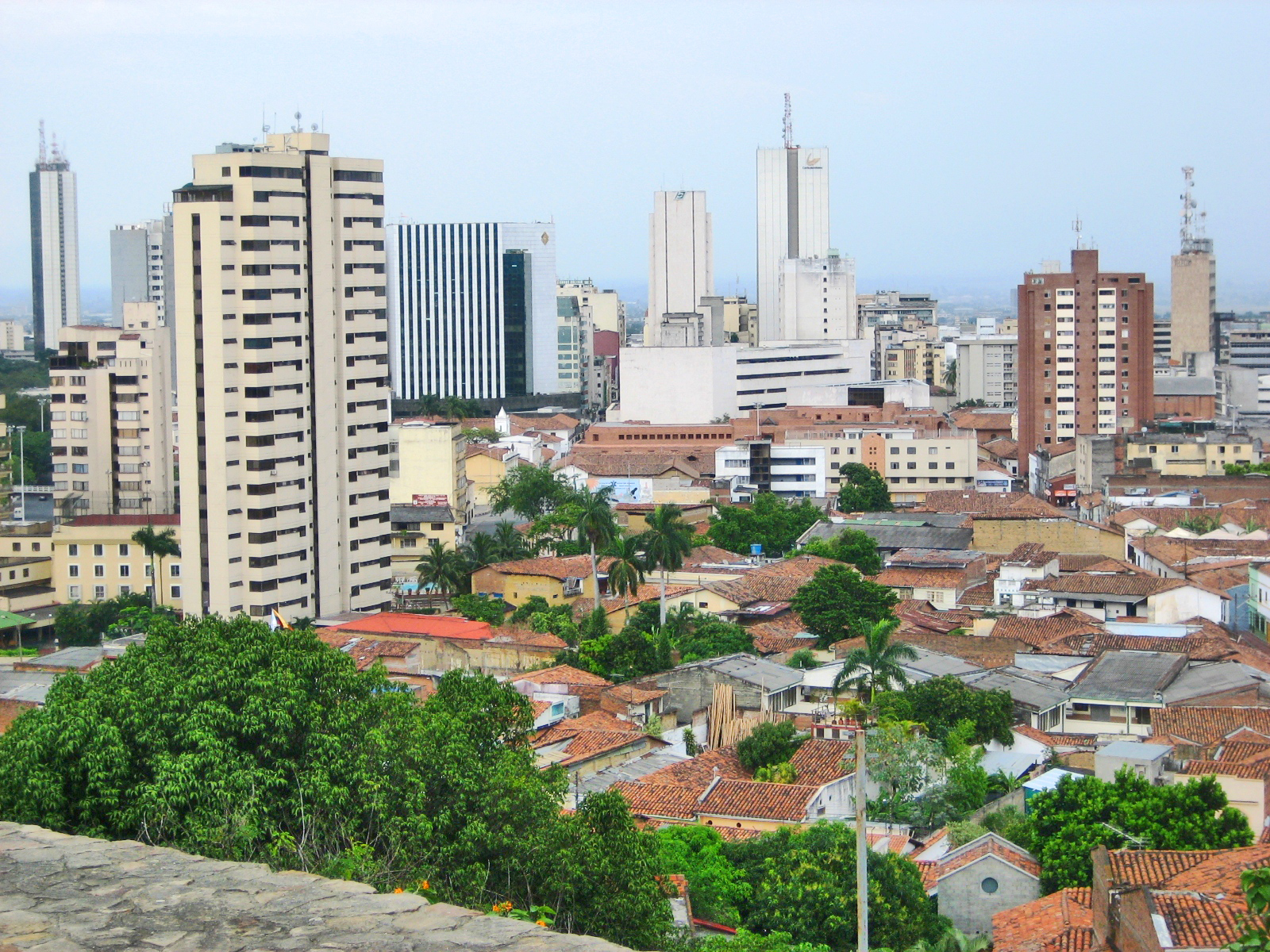
Cali, Colombia

Pacific Region

- Cali — 6th North Ave
- Buenaventura — Cascajal Island
- Quibdo — Atrato River Park

=== Paraguay ===
- Asunción — Calle Palma, Villa Morra (Senador Long, Lillo, and Malutín streets), Manora (Shopping del Sol mall and surroundings), Recoleta (Shopping Mariscal Lopez mall and surroundings), Av. España

=== Peru ===
- Arequipa — Avenida del Ejército in Cayma District
- Cusco — Avenida El Sol in Cusco District and Avenida La Cultura in Wanchaq District
- Lima — Jirón de la Unión in Lima District, Avenida Larco and Larcomar in Miraflores District, Jirón Agustín Gamarra in La Victoria District, Jockey Plaza in Santiago de Surco District, Avenida Conquistadores and Avenida Petit Thouars in San Isidro District
- Trujillo — Jirón Francisco Pizarro in Trujillo District

=== Uruguay ===
- Montevideo — 18 de Julio Avenue, Avenida Italia, Avenida Alfredo Arocena, Avenida Dr. Luis Alberto de Herrera, Peatonal Sarandí
- Salto — Calle Uruguay
- Punta del Este — Avenida Gorlero, Calle 20
- Ciudad de la Costa — Avenida Ing. Luis Giannattasio

=== Venezuela ===
- Caracas — Las Mercedes, Altamira, El Hatillo, Sabana Grande, La Candelaria, El Rosal
- Maracaibo — El Milagro
- Valencia — El Viñedo
- Maracay — Las Delicias
- Puerto La Cruz — Paseo Colon

== Oceania ==
=== Australia ===
Queensland

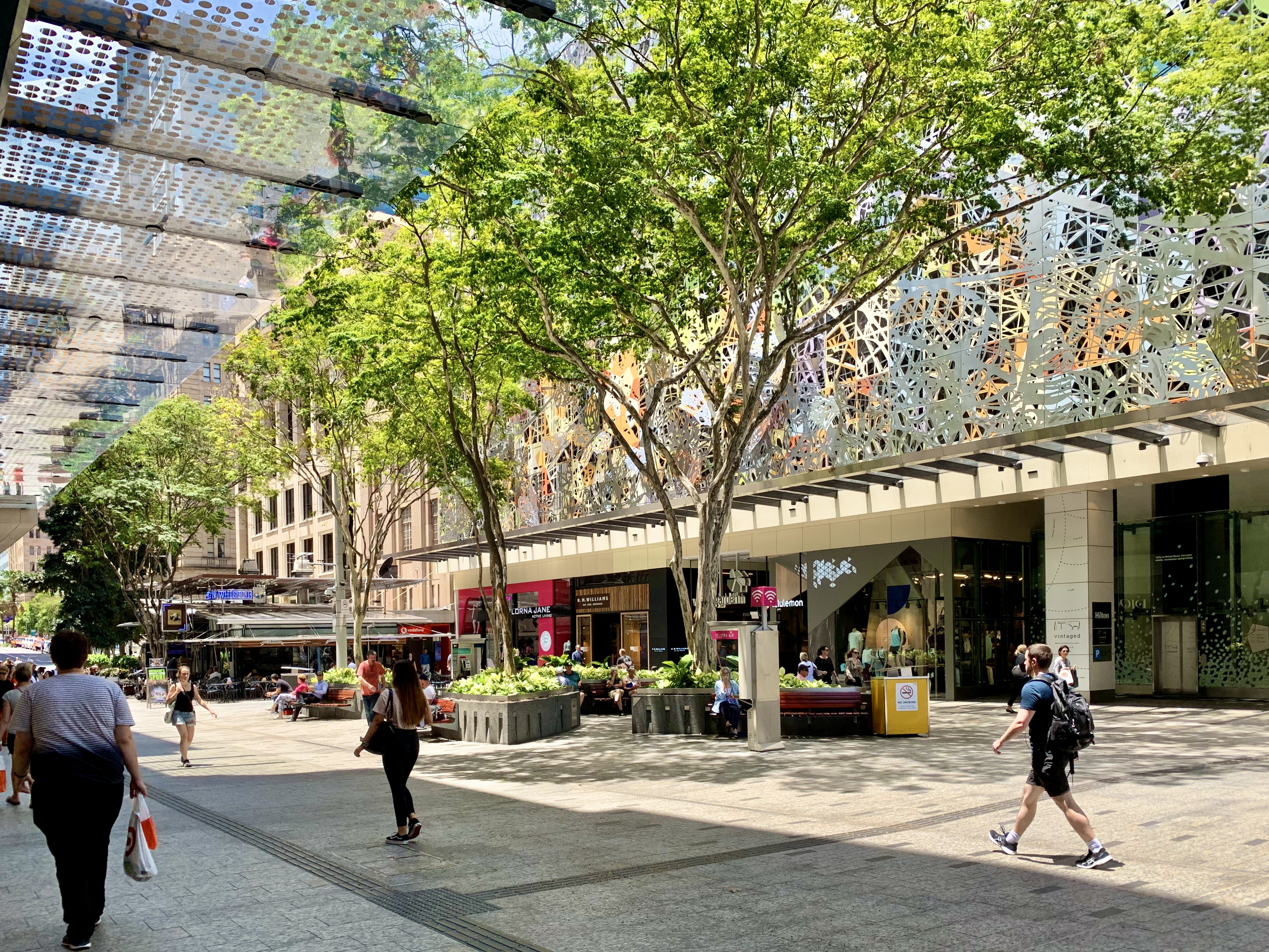
Queen Street Mall in Brisbane

- Brisbane — Queen Street Mall, Edward Street, Brisbane, Little Stanley Street, Brunswick Street
- Noosa Heads — Hastings Street

New South Wales

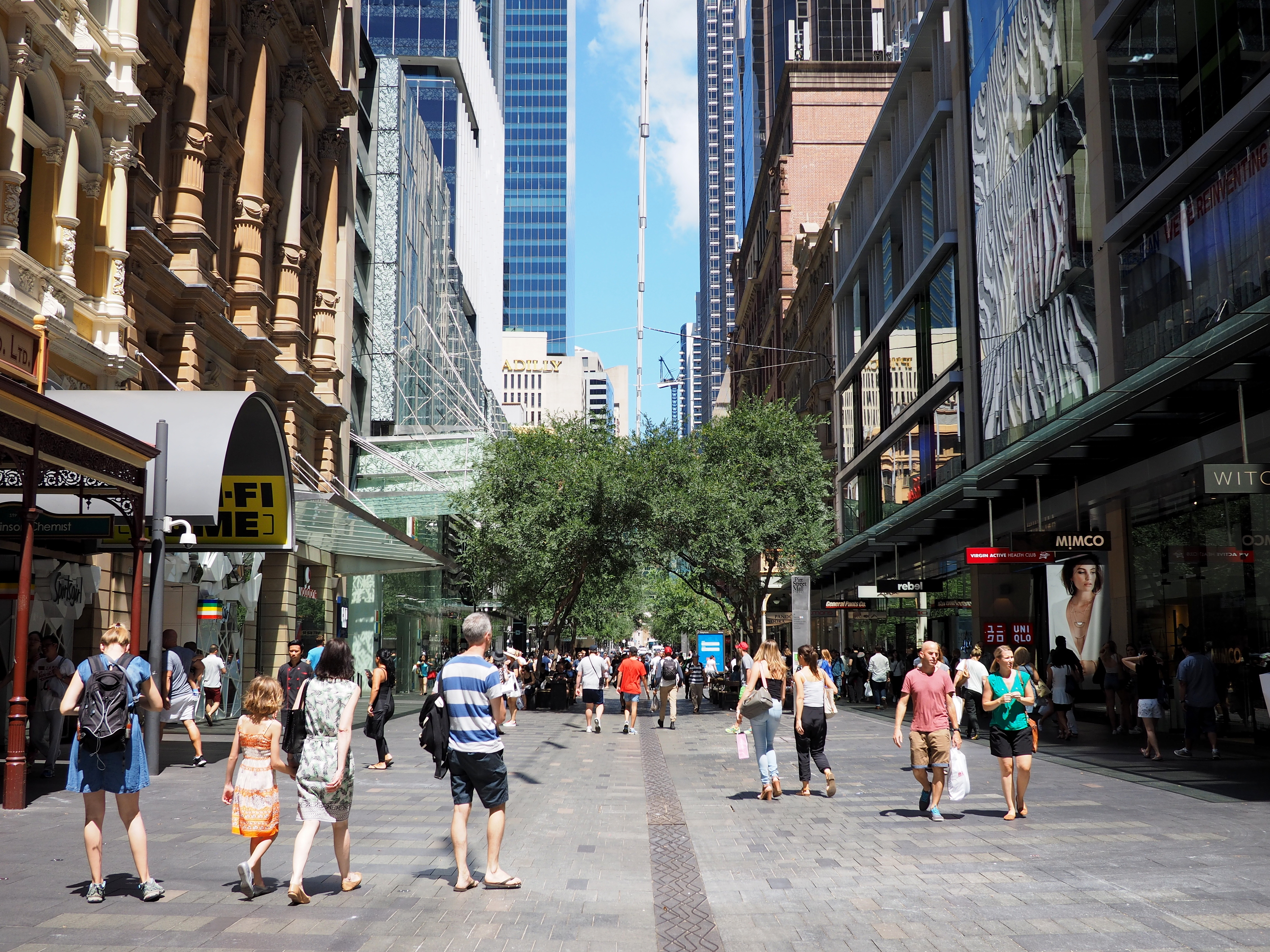
Pitt Street Mall in Sydney

- Sydney — Pitt Street Mall, Market Street, Oxford Street, Castlereagh Street, Double Bay, King Street, George Street, Victoria Avenue, The Corso, Hay Street
- Wollongong — Crown Street

South Australia

- Adelaide — Rundle Mall, Rundle Street, North Terrace
- Burnside — Burnside Village
- Unley — King William Road
- Netherby — Fullarton Road
- Parkside — Glen Osmond Road
- Norwood — The Parade
- Semaphore — Semaphore Road

Northern Territory

- Darwin — Smith Street Mall

Tasmania

- Hobart — Liverpool Street, Elizabeth Street Mall, Collins Street, Salamanca Place

Victoria

- Melbourne — Collins Street, Bourke Street, Flinders Lane, Chapel Street, Glenferrie Road - Hawthorn, Burke Road - Camberwell, Bridge Road - Richmond, Acland Street- St Kilda

Western Australia

- Perth — King Street, Hay Street, Murray Street

=== New Zealand ===
- Auckland — Queen Street, Ponsonby Road
- Christchurch — Cashel Street
- Dunedin — George Street, Stuart Street
- Hamilton — Victoria Street
- Wellington — Lambton Quay, Cuba Street

== See also ==
- List of shopping malls by country
