= List of bus routes in Suffolk County, New York =

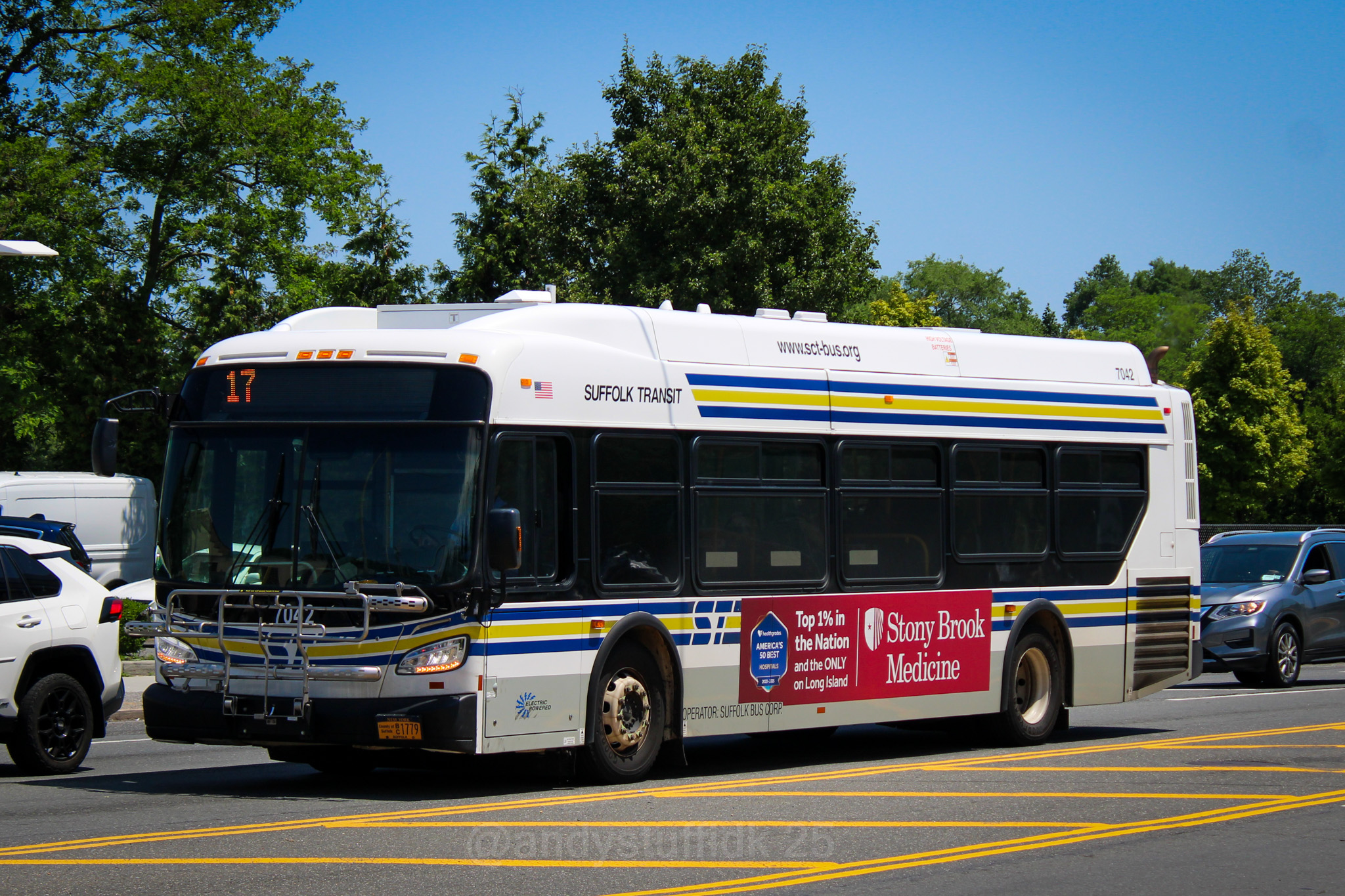
Bus 7042 Operated by Suffolk Bus Corp on Route 17 in Central Islip in June 2025

Suffolk County Transit operates numerous bus routes in Suffolk County, New York, United States; a few in the town of Huntington are operated by Huntington Area Rapid Transit. The Villages of Patchogue and Port Jefferson, also have had their own local jitney bus routes, although budget cuts have forced these villages to take its buses out of service. Some of them are descendants of streetcar lines (see List of streetcar lines on Long Island).

The following tables give details for the routes that primarily service Suffolk County. For details on routes that run into Suffolk County but do not service it primarily, see:

- List of bus routes in Nassau County, New York: n54, n55, n70, n71, n79

== Suffolk County Transit (SCT) ==
On October 29, 2023, Suffolk Transit introduced the Reimagine Transit Initiative, a full redesign of the bus network. As part of this redesign, there is daily service system-wide with local buses running weekdays until 10 p.m. and to 8 or 9 p.m. on weekends.

=== All current routes ===
Most routes west of Port Jefferson and Patchogue are scheduled with 30 minute headways (60 minutes on routes 3, 10 and 15) during weekdays until at least 6:00 p.m. On all routes from Port Jefferson and Patchogue and to the east, including the north-south routes between those two terminals, there are 60-minute headways (except for 30-minute headways on routes 51 and 66). All weekday late evening and weekend service runs on 60-minute headways. Route numbers are lower in the western portion of the county (1 through 17) and higher in the middle and eastern portions (51 through 92). Odd-numbered routes are generally oriented north to south, with even numbers west to east. Timed connections between routes can be made at Long Island Rail Road stations in Amityville, Bay Shore, Brentwood, Central Islip, Patchogue, and Riverhead, and at the Smith Haven Mall.

SCT also runs two on-demand systems on the South Fork in Southampton and in East Hampton operated by Hampton Jitney and Via Transportation that replaced the former 10A, 10B, and 10C bus routes. The two on-demand zones connect with Route 92 in Southampton, Sag Harbor, and East Hampton. The zones operate 7 days a week between 6 AM and 8 PM, including holidays.

In early June 2024, SCT added a new route, the 56, running between Smithtown Railroad and Kings Park Manor.

In October 2026, SCT replaced Routes 77 and 77Y with a new and the third SCT On-Demand zone and Route 110 with a new commuter service, the Long Island Express.

In the following table, routes highlighted in red have 30-minute service on weekdays, with non-highlighted routes having 60-minute service. All routes that run on weekends have 60-minute service.

Route	Terminals			Major streets served	Notes
1	Amityville; LIRR station	↔	Halesite; Firehouse	Broadway (Amityville), Broad Hollow Road, Walt Whitman Road, New York Avenue	Directly serves SUNY Farmingdale and Walt Whitman Shops.; LIRR connections: Amityville, Huntington
2	Amityville; LIRR station	↔	Patchogue; LIRR station	Montauk Highway	Directly serves South Shore University Hospital.; LIRR connections: Amityville, Babylon, Bay Shore, Oakdale, Patchogue
3	Babylon; LIRR station	↔	South Huntington; Walt Whitman Shops	Belmont Avenue, Deer Park Avenue, Carman Road, New York Avenue	Directly serves Five Towns College in Dix Hills.; LIRR connections: Babylon, Wyandanch
4	Amityville; LIRR station	↔	Lake Grove; Smith Haven Mall	Straight Path, Grand Boulevard, Suffolk Avenue, Nichols Road	Serves Tanger Outlets in Deer Park along Grand Boulevard.; LIRR connections: Amityville, Wyandanch, Deer Park, Brentwood, Central Islip
5	Babylon; LIRR station	↔	Lake Grove; Smith Haven Mall	Deer Park Avenue, Suffolk Avenue, Middle Country Road	Directly serves State Office Building in Hauppauge.; LIRR connections: Babylon, Deer Park, Brentwood, Smithtown
6	South Huntington; Walt Whitman Shops	↔	Patchogue; LIRR station	Jericho Turnpike, Veterans Memorial Highway	Directly serves State Office Building and North County Complex in Hauppauge and MacArthur Airport.; LIRR connections: Central Islip, Patchogue
7	Bay Shore; LIRR station	↔	Northport; VA Medical Center	Brook Avenue, Crooked Hill Road, Larkfield Road	Directly serves South Shore Mall and Suffolk County Community College Grant Campus.; LIRR connections: Bay Shore, Brentwood, Northport
10	Amityville; LIRR station	↔	Babylon; LIRR station	Albany Avenue, Farmingdale Road, Albin Avenue, Montauk Highway	Directly serves Great South Bay Shopping Center in West Babylon.; LIRR connections: Amityville, Lindenhurst, Babylon
11	Bay Shore; LIRR station	↔	Hauppauge; State Office Building	Brentwood Road, Broadway (Brentwood), Washington Avenue, Oser Avenue	Directly serves South Shore University Hospital.; LIRR connections: Brentwood, Bay Shore
12	East Farmingdale; Farmingdale State College	↔	Bay Shore; LIRR station	Colonial Springs Road, Nicolls Road, Bayshore Road	LIRR connections: Wyandanch, Bay Shore
15	Babylon; LIRR station	↔	Robert Moses State Park; Parking Field 3	Montauk Highway, Robert Moses Causeway	Summer daytime service only. In 2025, operates daily from June 16 until September 1.; No early a.m. service.; Directly serves Captree Fishing Basin on all trips.; Directly serves Good Samaritan University Hospital.; LIRR connections: Babylon
17	East Islip; Montauk Highway and Carleton Avenue	↔	Hauppauge; State Office Building	Carleton Avenue, Lowell Avenue, Hawthorne Avenue, Veterans Memorial Highway	Directly serves county and federal courts.; LIRR connections: Central Islip
51	Patchogue; LIRR station	↔	Port Jefferson; Shopping Plaza	Patchogue-Holbrook Road, Hawkins Avenue, New York State Route 347, Nicolls Road, Broadway (Port Jeff)	Directly serves Smith Haven Mall in Lake Grove and Stony Brook University.; LIRR connections: Patchogue, Ronkonkoma, Stony Brook, Port Jefferson
52A	Central Islip; LIRR station	↔	Gordon Heights; Hawkins Avenue and Rose Lane at Gordon Heights Fire Department	All trips: Veterans Highway, Motor Parkway, Ocean Avenue, Hawkins Avenue, Portion Road, 52A trips: Mooney Pond Road, Coram Plaza; 52B trips: Horseblock Road, Granny Road	Route 52B weekday daytime service only.; Alternate buses serve each route, with each route switching to the other at the Gordon Heights terminal for service back to Central Islip.; Routes shared to Suffolk County Community College Ammerman Campus in Selden.; LIRR connections: Central Islip, Ronkonkoma
52B	Central Islip; LIRR station	↔	Gordon Heights; Hawkins Avenue and Rose Lane at Gordon Heights Fire Department	All trips: Veterans Highway, Motor Parkway, Ocean Avenue, Hawkins Avenue, Portion Road, 52A trips: Mooney Pond Road, Coram Plaza; 52B trips: Horseblock Road, Granny Road	Route 52B weekday daytime service only.; Alternate buses serve each route, with each route switching to the other at the Gordon Heights terminal for service back to Central Islip.; Routes shared to Suffolk County Community College Ammerman Campus in Selden.; LIRR connections: Central Islip, Ronkonkoma
53	Patchogue; LIRR station	↔	Port Jefferson; Shopping Plaza	Waverly Avenue, Boyle Road, Terryville Road	Directly serves Suffolk County Community College Ammerman Campus, College Plaza.; LIRR connections: Patchogue
55	Patchogue; LIRR station	↔	Port Jefferson; Shopping Plaza	Medford Avenue, Patchogue-Port Jefferson Road, Patchogue Road	Directly serves Coram Plaza.; LIRR connections: Patchogue, Medford
56	Smithtown; LIRR station	↔	Kings Park Manor	New York State Route 25	Weekday mid-day service only.; Directly serves Siena Village and Saint Catherine of Siena Hospital.; As of October 16, 2026, this route to be replaced by a new On-Demand zone in the near-future.; LIRR connections: Kings Park, Smithtown
58	Brentwood; LIRR station	↔	Riverhead; LIRR station	Suffolk Avenue, New York State Route 347, New York State Route 25, Middle Country Road	Directly serves Smith Haven Mall in Lake Grove and Coram Plaza.; LIRR connections: Brentwood, Riverhead
62	Hauppauge; State Office Building	↔	Riverhead; LIRR station	New York State Route 347, New York State Route 25A, Middle Country Road	Directly serves Smith Haven Mall in Lake Grove, Stony Brook Technology Center and Mather Hospital.; LIRR connections: Port Jefferson, Riverhead
66	Patchogue; LIRR station	↔	Riverhead; LIRR station	Main Street (Patchogue), Montauk Highway, William Floyd Parkway, Mastic Road, Moriches-Riverhead Road	Directly serves Suffolk County Community College Eastern Campus.; Riverhead-bound trips serve Peconic Bay Medical Center.; LIRR connections: Patchogue, Bellport, Mastic-Shirley, Riverhead
80	Riverhead; LIRR station	↺	Riverhead Circulator	Counter-clockwise loop: Northville Turnpike, Old Country Road, River Road, Nugent Drive	Counter-clockwise direction only.; Directly serves Peconic Bay Medical Center, John Wesley Village, Tanger Outlets Riverhead, Calverton Hills.; LIRR connections: Riverhead
92	Orient Point; Ferry dock	↔	East Hampton; LIRR station	Main Road, Main Street (North Fork), North Road, Bridgehampton-Sag Harbor Turnpike, East Hampton-Sag Harbor Turnpike	Winter schedule from November to April, otherwise summer schedule.; Longest local bus route in the Northeastern United States at over 70 miles (110 km).; LIRR connections: Riverhead, Hampton Bays, Southampton, East Hampton
495 Long Island Express	Riverhead; LIRR station	→ AM ---- ← PM	Hicksville; LIRR Station; Barclay Street	Long Island Expressway (Interstate 495)	Weekday rush hour peak service only.; Operates as a loop, originating in Ronkonkoma in the AM, towards Riverhead, Hicksville, and back to Ronkonkoma. PM loop Ronkonkoma-Hicksville-Riverhead-Ronkonkoma.; The Long Island Express is also known as Route 495 and additionally listed as Route HOV.; Serves Riverhead, Calverton Hills, Medford, Farmingville (Exit 63 P/R), Ronkonkoma, Islandia (Exit 58 P/R), Hauppauge, Melville (Rt 110 P/R), and Hicksville.; Replaced the 110 Suffolk Clipper.; LIRR connections: Hicksville, Ronkonkoma, Riverhead
495 Long Island Express	Hicksville; LIRR Station; Barclay Street	→ AM ---- ← PM	Ronkonkoma; LIRR Station	Long Island Expressway (Interstate 495)	
495 Long Island Express	Ronkonkoma; LIRR Station	→ AM ---- ← PM	Riverhead; LIRR station	Long Island Expressway (Interstate 495)	

==== History of current routes ====
These current routes are replacements and reconfigurations of the previous routes that were prefixed with an "S" label, although more localized routes did not have the prefix. The prefix denoted Suffolk County, akin to route labeling in other transit systems around the region. See further down in this article for historical information about all of the former routes. Most of the routes listed in this table replaced all of the former routes on October 29, 2023.

Route	History
1	Replaced the S1 with virtually no changes.
2	Replaced the S40 and S20 with service cut back from Sunrise Mall in Nassau County to Amityville LIRR station.
3	Replaced portions of the S23 and S25.
4	Replaced portions of the S33 and 3D.
5	Replaced the S23/29 along Deer Park Avenue, S58 in Smithtown, and 3B in Brentwood.
6	Replaced the S54 with the route modified to serve the Central Islip LIRR station.
7	Replaced the S41, along with portions of the S45 in Brentwood/North Bay Shore.
10	Replaced portions of the S20 and the 1A.
11	Replaced portions of the S27, S45, and 3B in Brentwood/North Bay Shore.
12	Replaced the 2A and 2B.
15	Replaced the S47 with virtually no changes.
17	Replaced the 3C.
51	Replaced portions of the S59, S60, S69 and 7A.
52A/B	Replaced portions of the S57, S60 and 6A. The 52B replaces the S63 in Farmingville.
53	Replaced the S60, S63 and 6B.
55	Replaced the S61.
56	Replaced portions of the S56. Service started June 3, 2024.
58	Replaced portions of the S58, S62, and 8A.
62	Replaced the S62.; On September 1, 2024, service was extended along Route 347 from Smith Haven Mall to the New York State Office Building in Hauppauge.
66	Replaced the S66.
80	Replaced the 8A.
92	Replaced the S92 with virtually no changes.

=== Former routes ===
==== Former routes - Post SCT Redesign ====
On October 25, 2026, SCT had its first major service changes since the 2023 redesign, including eliminating three routes.

Route	Terminals		Major streets served	Notes
77	Patchogue; LIRR station	Bellport; South Country Road and Woodruff Street	All trips: Montauk Highway, Sills Road, 77 trips: Station Road; 77Y trips: Horseblock Road, Yaphank Avenue	Route alternately shared during weekday peak hours with route 77Y to North Bellport.; Directly served Long Island Community Hospital.; Replaced the 7B branch to Bellport.; Replaced on October 25, 2026 for the South Country On-Demand Zone.
77Y	Patchogue; LIRR station	East Yaphank; The Boulevard	All trips: Montauk Highway, Sills Road, 77 trips: Station Road; 77Y trips: Horseblock Road, Yaphank Avenue	Weekday rush hour service only.; Route alternately shared with route 77 to North Bellport.; Directly served Long Island Community Hospital and Suffolk County Probation.; Replaced S68 Yaphank trips.; On September 3, 2024, service was extended from the Yaphank Correctional Facility to The Boulevard Apartments on William Floyd Parkway, via Yaphank Avenue and the Long Island Expressway.; Replaced on October 25, 2026 for the South Country On-Demand Zone.
110 Suffolk Clipper	Farmingville; LIE Exit 63; Park & Ride	Melville; Hub Drive	Long Island Expressway, New York State Route 110	Weekday rush hour peak direction service only.; Served Islandia, Hauppauge and the NY 110 corridor.; The Suffolk Clipper was known as Route 110, also as S110 before the Suffolk County Transit Redesign.; Replaced on October 25, 2026 for the Long Island Express Service (Route HOV).

==== Former routes - S1 to S94 ====
Most of these routes were reconfigured and replaced by the routes listed above on October 29, 2023 in conjunction with the Reimagine Transit Initiative.

Route	Terminals		Major streets	History	Notes
S1	Halesite; Firehouse	Amityville; LIRR station	New York Avenue, Walt Whitman Road, Broad Hollow Road, Broadway (Amityville)	Replaced the Huntington Railroad in 1919 and the Huntington Traction Company (present-day site of Walt Whitman Shops to Halesite) in 1927. Previously owned by Alert Coach Lines until 1985.	Directly served SUNY Farmingdale and Walt Whitman Shops.; Last run on October 28, 2023 due to Suffolk County Transit Redesign.
S20	Massapequa Park, Nassau County; Westfield Sunrise	Babylon; LIRR station	Loudon Avenue, then: Clockwise Loop: Oak Street, East John Street, Railroad Avenue, Montauk Highway, New York State Route 110	The Oak Street portion of the route follows an old route that used to be run by Bornscheuer Bus Co, Inc from Amityville to Babylon during the late 1940s to the late 1950s; Service added along Montauk Highway to replace the truncated NICE route n19 by running loop route return service in both directions starting February 22, 2016.	Service from Babylon ran counter-clockwise starting at Railroad Avenue and served Sunrise Mall before completing the loop.; Last run on October 28, 2023 due to Suffolk County Transit Redesign.
S21	Massapequa Park; Westfield Sunrise	South Huntington; Walt Whitman Shops	New York State Route 109, New York State Route 110	Previously owned by Alert Coach Lines. Cut sometime between 1986 and 1989	
S23	South Huntington; Walt Whitman Shops	Babylon; LIRR station	Deer Park Avenue, Grand Boulevard, Bagatelle Road, Wolf Hill Road	Formerly owned by Inter-County Motor Coach	Directly served Five Towns College in Dix Hills.; Last run on October 28, 2023 due to Suffolk County Transit Redesign.
S25	Northwest Babylon; Five Corners	Babylon; LIRR station	Little East Neck Road/Belmont Avenue	Formerly owned by Inter-County Motor Coach	Service via Great South Bay Shopping Center in West Babylon.; Last run on October 28, 2023 due to Suffolk County Transit Redesign.
S27	Hauppauge; Suffolk County office complex	Babylon; LIRR station	Udall Road, Washington Avenue (Brentwood)	Formerly owned by Inter-County Motor Coach	Directly served Tanger Outlets in Deer Park.; Last run on October 28, 2023 due to Suffolk County Transit Redesign.
S29	South Huntington; Walt Whitman Shops	West Babylon; Great South Bay Shopping Center	Deer Park Avenue, Deer Park Road	Formerly owned by Inter-County Motor Coach	Only route to serve Babylon LIRR station but not terminate there.; Last run on October 28, 2023 due to Suffolk County Transit Redesign.
S31	Northwest Babylon; Five Corners	Copiague; Montauk Highway	Wellwood Avenue, Broad Hollow Road, Great Neck Road		Operated weekday rush hours only; no service on weekends.; Directly served Newsday offices in Melville.; Last run on October 27, 2023 due to Suffolk County Transit Redesign.
S33	Massapequa Park, Nassau County; Westfield Sunrise	Hauppauge; Suffolk County office complex (see Notes)	Straight Path, Grand Boulevard, Commack Road, Oser Avenue	Formerly owned by Inter-County Motor Coach	Directly served Tanger Outlets at the Arches and Brentwood campus of Suffolk Community College.; Weekdays, this route looped clockwise in Hauppauge; weekends, the route terminated at Oser Avenue and Marcus Boulevard.; Last run on October 28, 2023 due to Suffolk County Transit Redesign.
S35	Northwest Babylon; Five Corners	West Babylon; Great South Bay Shopping Center	Wellwood Avenue/Straight Path, Hoffman Avenue	Formerly owned by Inter-County Motor Coach	Operated weekdays only.; Loop operated from Great South Bay to Five Corners via Straight Path and back to Great South Bay via Edison Avenue and Wellwood Avenue.; Last day of operation October 7, 2016 because of budget problems and low ridership.
S40	Babylon; LIRR station	Patchogue; LIRR station	Montauk Highway	Operated by Utility Lines, subsidiary of Bee Line, Inc. as N19. Route was transferred to Metropolitan Suburban Bus Authority in 1973 and portion of route from Babylon to Patchogue was split-off. From 1972 to 1975 it was operated by MSBA under contract with Suffolk County, after a funding dispute between Nassau and Suffolk the route was operated by Alert Coach Lines, then after complaints of bad service MSBA was brought back as operator which it did until Suffolk County took over bus operations in 1980–1981. Since 1981 the route has been run by Suffolk Bus Corp.; Middle Road and Blue Point Avenue was part of the Bayport-Blue Point line owned by the South Shore Traction Company and then the Suffolk Traction Company until the latter closed in 1919 because of bankruptcy.; Alternate service via Middle Road and Blue Point Avenue was rerouted to Montauk Highway on November 1, 2020.	Last run on October 28, 2023 due to Suffolk County Transit Redesign.
S41	Northport; VA Medical Center	Bay Shore; Park Avenue	Fifth Avenue, Crooked Hill Road, Larkfield Road		Last run on October 28, 2023 due to Suffolk County Transit Redesign.
S42	Babylon; LIRR station	Central Islip; LIRR station	Union Boulevard, Islip Avenue		Last run on October 28, 2023 due to Suffolk County Transit Redesign.
S45	Smithtown; LIRR station	Bay Shore; Park Avenue	NYS Route 111, Motor Parkway, Suffolk Avenue, Brentwood Road		Last run on October 28, 2023 due to Suffolk County Transit Redesign.
S47	Babylon; LIRR station	Robert Moses State Park; Parking Field 3	Montauk Highway, Robert Moses Causeway		Summer daily service only (mid-June to Labor Day).; Last run on September 4, 2023 due to Suffolk County Transit Redesign.
S54	South Huntington; Walt Whitman Shops	Patchogue; LIRR station	Jericho Turnpike, Veterans Memorial Highway	Formerly owned by Inter-County Motor Coach	Last run on October 28, 2023 due to Suffolk County Transit Redesign.
S56	Commack; Commack Plaza	Lake Grove; Smith Haven Mall	Jericho Turnpike, Middle Country Road, Main Street, St. Johnland Road	Formerly operated by Coram Bus Service; Created from part of the Commack to Smith Haven Mall section of the S64; which was originally owned by Coram Bus Service before county take over in 1981.	Last run on October 28, 2023 due to Suffolk County Transit Redesign.
S57	Sayville; Montauk Highway (Main Street)	Lake Grove; Smith Haven Mall	Hauppauge Road, Veterans Memorial Highway, Hawkins Avenue	Formerly owned by Inter-County Motor Coach	Directly served MacArthur Airport and Lakeland Apartments.; Last run on October 28, 2023 due to Suffolk County Transit Redesign.
S58	East Northport; Huntington Square Mall	Riverhead; County Center	Jericho Turnpike, Middle Country Road	Formerly owned by Coram Bus Service	Directly served Selden campus of Suffolk County Community College.; Last run on October 28, 2023 due to Suffolk County Transit Redesign.
S59	Lake Grove; Smith Haven Mall	Sayville; Montauk Highway (Main Street)	Johnson Avenue, Veterans Memorial Highway, Union Avenue, Hawkins Avenue		Last run on October 28, 2023 due to Suffolk County Transit Redesign.
S60	Lake Grove; Smith Haven Mall	Gordon Heights; Hawkins Avenue and Rose Lane	Stony Brook Road, Old Town Road, Terryville Road	Originally operated from Smith Haven Mall to Port Jefferson Station, Via Stony Brook University. Formerly a route created by Stony Brook University Student Government so that Students would have service to two local shopping centers, and was first operated by Four Season Bus Company until the company left then unknown who operated it after that. Route was merged with the Coram to Port Jefferson Station portion of the S64	Directly served Stony Brook University.; Last run on October 28, 2023 due to Suffolk County Transit Redesign.
S61	Port Jefferson; Ferry dock	Patchogue; LIRR station	Medford Avenue, Patchogue-Port Jefferson Road, Patchogue Road	Previously owned by Alert Coach Lines	Last run on October 28, 2023 due to Suffolk County Transit Redesign.
S62	Hauppauge; Industrial Complex	Riverhead; County Center	Neconset Highway, NYS Route 25A	Formerly owned by Coram Bus Service	Early-morning and late-evening service ran between Port Jefferson Shopping Plaza and Riverhead.; Saturday service ran between Smith Haven Mall and Riverhead.; Service alternated between Route 25A and Wading River Road in Wading River.; Last run on October 28, 2023 due to Suffolk County Transit Redesign.
S63	Patchogue LIRR station	Lake Grove; Smith Haven Mall	Middle Country Road, Waverly Avenue	Formerly owned by Inter-County Motor Coach	Directly served IRS office in Holtsville and Selden campus of Suffolk County Community College.; Last run on October 28, 2023 due to Suffolk County Transit Redesign.
S64	Coram; Shopping Plaza	Lake Grove; Smith Haven Mall	Old Town Road, Terryville Road, New York State Route 25A, Lake Avenue, Jericho Turnpike, Middle Country Road, Main Street, St. Johnland Road	Operated Via Port Jefferson Village, Stony Brook Village, Stony Brook station, St. James station, Smithtown, Kings Park, and Commack Plaza.	Originally ended in Mayfair Shopping Center prior to 1969.; Coram to Port Jefferson Station portion merged into the S60 sometime after 1987; Commack to Smith Haven Mall portion replaced by the S56 sometime after the county took over bus operations.; Originally run by Coram Bus Service.
S66	Patchogue LIRR station	Riverhead; County Center	Montauk Highway, South Country Road, William Floyd Parkway, Riverhead-Moriches Road		Alternate service to Bellport LIRR station and to Walden Pond in East Moriches.; Formerly terminated in Center Moriches; later extended eastward to Riverhead.; Last run on October 28, 2023 due to Suffolk County Transit Redesign.
S68	Patchogue LIRR station	Bellport; Station Road	Montauk Highway, South Country Road, William Floyd Parkway, Riverhead-Moriches Road		Rush hour service operated to Yaphank via Old Dock Road (from Patchogue AM, to Patchogue PM).; Last run on October 28, 2023 due to Suffolk County Transit Redesign.
S68	Patchogue LIRR station	Center Moriches; Bank Street (limited service)	Montauk Highway, South Country Road, William Floyd Parkway, Riverhead-Moriches Road		Rush hour service operated to Yaphank via Old Dock Road (from Patchogue AM, to Patchogue PM).; Last run on October 28, 2023 due to Suffolk County Transit Redesign.
S69	Port Jefferson; Port Jefferson Shopping Plaza	Lake Grove; Smith Haven Mall	(westbound) Neconset-Port Jefferson Highway, (eastbound) North Country Road, West Broadway, Main Street (Port Jeff)	Formerly owned by Coram Bus Service; called the Night Loop	Operated evenings only; clockwise loop from Port Jefferson Plaza to Smith Haven Mall, to Stony Brook University campus, to Port Jefferson LIRR station and back to Port Jefferson Plaza.; Last run on October 28, 2023 due to Suffolk County Transit Redesign.
S71	Stony Brook; LIRR station	Shirley; William Floyd Shopping Center	Nicolls Road, Horse Block Road, Yaphank Avenue		Directly served Stony Brook University, Selden campus of Suffolk Community College, and Brookhaven Town Hall.; Last day of operation October 8, 2016 because of budget problems and low ridership.
S74	Lake Grove; Smith Haven Mall	Smith Point County Park	Middle Country Road, William Floyd Parkway	Originally owned by Coram Bus Service.; Cut in 1998 due to budget problems and low ridership.	Summer seasonal service only; Stopped at Coram Plaza
S76	Stony Brook; Main Street	Port Jefferson Station; Shopping Plaza	North Country Road		Last run on October 28, 2023 due to Suffolk County Transit Redesign.
S90	Center Moriches; Bank Street	Riverhead; County Center	Montauk Highway, Lewis Road, Riverhead-Quogue Road		One trip per day in each direction served Francis S. Gabreski Airport in Westhampton Beach.; Last day of operation on October 8, 2016 because of budget problems and low ridership.
S92	Orient Point; Ferry dock	East Hampton; LIRR station	Main Road, Main Street (North Fork), North Road, Bridgehampton-Sag Harbor Turnpike, East Hampton-Sag Harbor Turnpike	Created and owned by Sunrise Coach Lines, who operated it under contract from Suffolk County from 1981 to 2012, when Suffolk decided to limit the number of operators it deals with; Sunrise Coach continues to operate the route as a sub-contractor via a joint venture owned with Hampton Jitney called Twin Forks Transit.	Longest local bus route in the Northeastern United States at over 70 miles (110 km).; Last run on October 28, 2023 due to Suffolk County Transit Redesign.
S94	Montauk; Montauk Highway	Montauk Point State Park; Montauk Point Light	Montauk Highway		Summer seasonal service only (mid-June to Labor Day).; Last day of operations on July 31, 2018 as part of a cost-neutral measure to add service on the 10B.

==== Former routes - 1A to 10E ====
Route	Terminals		Major Streets of Operation	Notes
1A	Amityville Loop		Dixon Avenue, Great Neck Road, Albany Avenue	Last run on October 28, 2023 due to Suffolk County Transit Redesign.
1B	Lindenhurst	Copiague	Great Neck Avenue, Strong Avenue, Montauk Highway	Last run on October 8, 2016 due to budget problems and low ridership.; Some trips ran to Tanner Park Senior Citizen Center.
1C	Amityville	Copiague		Cut in 1991 due to budget problems and low ridership.
2A	Wyandanch	Westfield South Shore	Colonial Springs Road, Nicolls Road, Udall Road	Formerly owned by Inter-County Motor Coach.; Last run on October 28, 2023, due to Suffolk County Transit Redesign.
2B	SUNY Farmingdale	Bay Shore	Colonial Springs Road, Bay Shore Road, Route 27	Formerly owned by Inter-County Motor Coach.; Last run on October 28, 2023 due to Suffolk County Transit Redesign.
3A	Westfield South Shore	Hauppauge	Manatuck Boulevard, Washington Avenue, Moreland Road	Last run on October 28, 2023 due to Suffolk County Transit Redesign.
3B	Gardner Manor Plaza	Hauppauge	Sunrise Highway, Broadway, Fulton Street	Last run on October 28, 2023 due to Suffolk County Transit Redesign.
3C	Central Islip	Westfield South Shore	Route 27A, Connetquot Avenue	Last run on October 28, 2023 due to Suffolk County Transit Redesign.
3D	Brentwood	Stony Brook	Suffolk Avenue, Nichols Road, Nesconset Highway	Last run on October 28, 2023 due to Suffolk County Transit Redesign.
5A	Port Jefferson	Middle Island	North Country Road, Route 25A, Randall Road	Last run on October 28, 2023 due to Suffolk County Transit Redesign.
6A	Ronkonkoma	Coram	Hawkins Avenue, Portion Road, Mooney Pond Road	Last run on October 28, 2023 due to Suffolk County Transit Redesign.
6B	Selden	Smith Haven Mall	Middle County Road, Marktree Road, Hawkins Road	Last run on October 28, 2023 due to Suffolk County Transit Redesign.
7A	Patchogue	Ronkonkoma	Union Avenue, Main Street, Patchogue-Holbrook Road, South Ocean Avenue, North Ocean Avenue	Traveled partially along the old Main Line of the Suffolk Traction Company, from Patchogue Railroad Station to Holtsville on South Ocean Avenue, North Ocean Avenue, and Traction Boulevard.; Last run on October 28, 2023 due to Suffolk County Transit Redesign.
7B	Patchogue	Medford	Patchogue-Yaphank Road, Hospital Road, Horseblock Road	Last run on October 28, 2023 due to Suffolk County Transit Redesign.
7D	Shirley Loop		Moriches-Middle Island Road, Titmus Drive, Patchogue Avenue, West End Avenue	Last run on October 8, 2016 due to budget problems and low ridership.; Some trips ran to East Yaphank Industrial Center.
7E	Mastic and Mastic Beach Loop		William Floyd Parkway, Neighborhood Road, Mastic Road	Last run on October 8, 2016, due to budget problems and low ridership.; Some trips ran to Smith Point Park (summer only).
8A	Suffolk Community College East	Calverton	Riverhead-Moriches Road, East Main Street, Doctor's Path, Osborn Avenue, West Main Street	Former Sunrise Coach Lines route.; Last run on October 28, 2023 due to Suffolk County Transit Redesign.
9A	Mattituck	Orient Point		Former Sunrise Coach Lines route.; Cut in 1991 due to budget problems and low ridership.
10A	Southampton	Sag Harbor	County Road 80, North Sea Road, Noyac Road	Last run on October 8, 2016 due to budget problems and low ridership.; Some buses ran further north from Sag Harbor to the North Haven Ferry.; Restored in June 2021 as the new SCT On Demand Southampton/Sag Harbor zone.
10B	East Hampton	Bridgehampton	Montauk Highway, Three Mile Harbor Road, Springs-Fireplace Road	Route 10B temporarily replaced the East Hampton - Montauk On-Demand Zone starting October 29, 2023.; Last run on April 27, 2024, due to Suffolk County Transit Redesign.
10C	East Hampton	Montauk	Montauk Highway, Old Montauk Highway	Route 10C temporarily replaced the East Hampton - Montauk On-Demand Zone starting October 29, 2023.; Last run on April 27, 2024, due to Suffolk County Transit Redesign.
10D	East Quogue	Hampton Bays	Head of Lots Road, Tiana Road, Montauk Highway	Former Sunrise Coach Lines route.; Weekday service only.; Last run on October 7, 2016 due to budget problems and low ridership.
10E	Hampton Bays Loop		Springville Road, Wakeman Road, Newton Road, Squiretown Road, Ponquogue Avenue	Former Sunrise Coach Lines route.; Weekday service only.; Last run on October 7, 2016 due to budget problems and low ridership.

== Huntington Area Rapid Transit (HART) ==
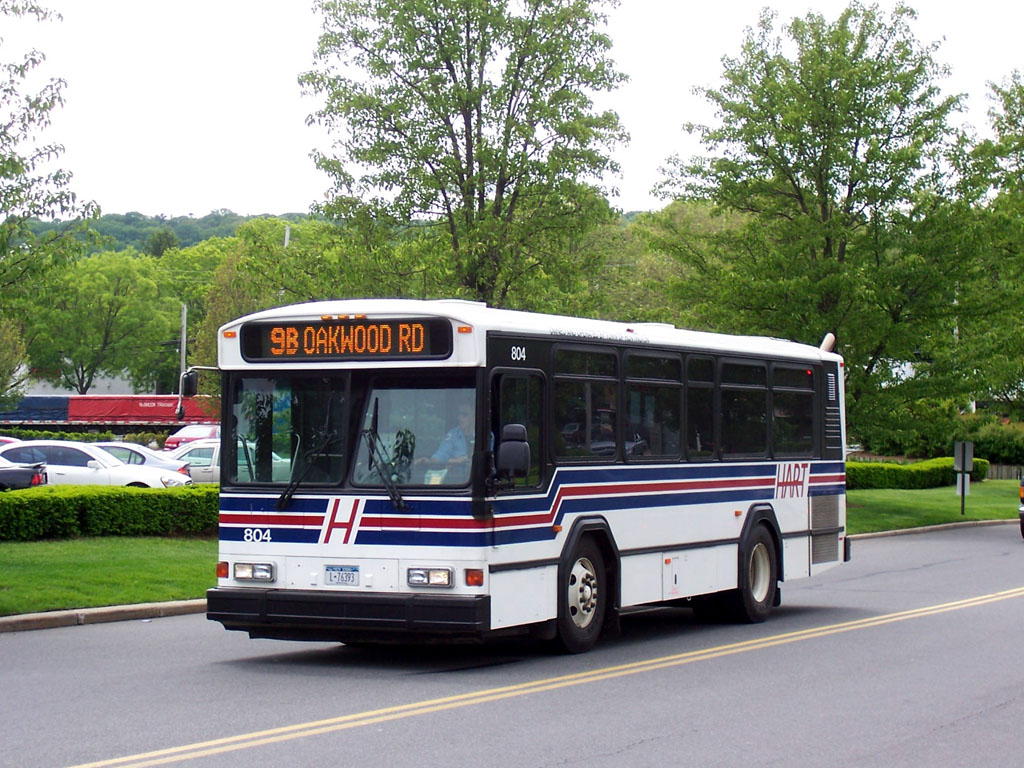
Former Route H9 at the Walt Whitman Mall in South Huntington

Huntington Area Rapid Transit exclusively serves the Town of Huntington. Service runs weekdays and Saturday until 6 p.m. with no service on Sunday. Service is scheduled approximately every 45 minutes on weekdays and 90 minutes on Saturday.

Route	Terminals			Streets traveled	Notes
H10	Cold Spring Harbor; Cold Spring Harbor State Park and Main Street (NY 25A)	↔	Commack; Jericho Turnpike at BJ's Plaza	NY 25A, NY 110, Oakwood Road, Pulaski Road, Larkfield Road, Jericho Turnpike (NY 25)	Directly serves Huntington Square Mall.; LIRR connections: Huntington, Greenlawn, Northport
H20	Halesite; New York Avenue (NY 110) and Park Avenue	↔	Huntington Station; Huntington LIRR Station	Park Avenue, Woodhull Road, Depot Road, 11th Street, 8th Avenue, NY 25, NY 110	Directly serves Walt Whitman Shops.; LIRR connections: Huntington
H30	Halesite; New York Avenue (NY 110) and Park Avenue	↔	South Huntington; Walt Whitman Shops	NY 110, NY 25A, then: Greenlawn Road - or - Centerport Road, then: Broadway-Greenlawn, NY 25, Pidgeon Hill Road, Wolf Hill Road.	Alternate buses serve each branch.; LIRR connections: Greenlawn
H40	Northport; Middleville Road at VA Medical Center	↔	South Huntington; Walt Whitman Shops	NY 25, Elwood Road, 5th Avenue, Larkfield Road, Laurel Road, Main Street, NY 25A, Middleville Road	LIRR connections: Northport

=== Former routes ===
Route	Terminals		Major streets	History and notes
H4	Northport	Walt Whitman Mall	NY 110, NY 25, Broadway-Greenlawn Road, Pulaski Road, NY 25A	Partly followed the old Northport Traction Company line.; Became route H40 from the January 2, 2013 route restructuring.
H6	Commack Plaza	Cold Spring Harbor	NY 25A, Greenlawn Road, Broadway-Greenlawn Road, Pulaski Road, Larkfield Road, NY 25.	
H9	Walt Whitman Mall Loop			
Red	Huntington Station Feeder Route			
Blue	Huntington Station Feeder Route			
HART "Summer; Bus"	Huntington	Centerport Beach	NY 25A, Greenlawn Road, Centerport Road	Summer weekdays only.
H10 (old)	Walt Whitman Mall	Northport Dock		Saturday service only.
H11	Walt Whitman Mall	Dix Hills		Saturday service only.
H12	Walt Whitman Mall	Greenlawn Station		Saturday service only.

== Village of Patchogue Transit ==
Village of Patchogue Transit (also known as Patchogue–Village Transit and Village of Patchogue Bus) was a bus system operated by the Village of Patchogue, with four routes connecting various locations throughout the village.

The system was established in 1975. Sometime after January 13, 2016, bus service was discontinued within Village of Patchogue. The fare to use the system was $0.25.

=== Former routes ===
The routes in the table below ran local within the village on weekdays only.

Route	Major streets traveled
1	Rider Avenue, Smith Street, South Ocean Avenue, Gilbert Street, Cedar Avenue, Laurel Street
2	River Avenue and Vicinity
3	West Main Street
4	North Ocean Avenue, Roe Boulevard West, Waverly Avenue, Sunwave Plaza
