= Huntington Area Rapid Transit =

Bus system in the Town of Huntington, New York, United States

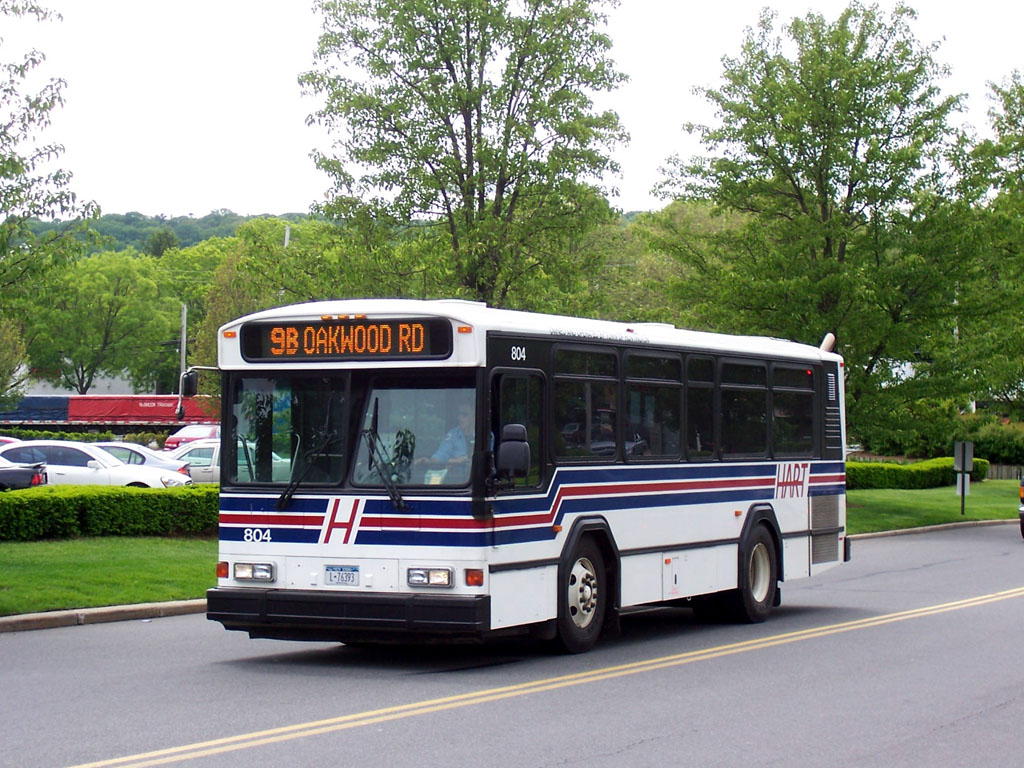
- HART #804 enters Walt Whitman Shops.
- Founded: 1978
- Headquarters: 144 East Second Street; Huntington Station, NY 11746
- Locale: Town of Huntington
- Service area: Town of Huntington
- Service type: Bus service
- Routes: 4
- Hubs: Huntington LIRR station Walt Whitman Mall
- Fleet: 12 fixed-route 12 paratransit (2013 figures)
- Daily ridership: 644 (weekday); 249 (Saturday)(2013 figures)
- Operator: Town of Huntington
- Chief executive: Edmund R. Smyth
- Website: www.huntingtonny.gov/hart

Huntington Area Rapid Transit (colloquially known by its acronym, HART) is a bus system exclusively within the Town of Huntington in Suffolk County, on Long Island, New York, in the United States.

Owned and operated by the Town of Huntington, the system is completely separate from Suffolk County Transit.

== History ==
Huntington Area Rapid Transit began operations in 1978. It was established in order to provide better connectivity throughout the town, and to better integrate it with the region's larger transportation networks, such as the Long Island Rail Road. In 1995, HART eliminated a bus route, known as the Red Line due to low ridership, only being used by 25 to 30 daily riders. The change was expected to save $40,000.

In 2018, the Town of Huntington installed security cameras inside and on the exterior of HART buses.

=== January 2, 2013 route changes ===
HART restructured five former routes prior to the January 2, 2013 changes. Three former fixed routes were restructured. Two weekday peak rail-feeder routes were eliminated because they were underutilized. The four new bus routes give more direct service, increase coverage area, and run exactly the same route in both directions. HART has restored service in the Cold Spring Harbor, Centerport and Northport Harbor areas.

The routes run every 45-50 minutes on weekdays and every 90–100 minutes on Saturdays, with none of them running on Sunday. The routes operate from approximately 7:00am to 7:00pm weekdays, and 9:00am to 7:00pm Saturdays.

HART also approved a fare hike to coincide with the January 2, 2013 changes. Previously the adult fare was $1.25, current adult fare as of January 3, 2017 is now $2.25.

== Fares ==
Fares for the buses are $2.25 for adults, $1.25 for students grades K-12, 75 cents for senior citizens (age 60+), individuals with disabilities, Medicare card holders, and free for children 44 inches and under. Transfers to other bus routes cost 25 cents, including to buses of the Suffolk County Transit and Nassau Inter-County Express systems.

== Bus routes ==
=== Current routes ===
HART currently operates the following routes:

Route	Terminals			Streets traveled
H10	Cold Spring Harbor; Cold Spring Harbor State Park and Main Street (NY 25A)	↔	Commack; Macy's Plaza and Jericho Turnpike	NY 25A, NY 110, Oakwood Road, Pulaski Road, Larkfield Road, Jericho Turnpike (NY 25)
H20	Halesite; New York Avenue (NY 110) and Park Avenue	↔	Huntington Station; Huntington LIRR station	Park Avenue, Woodhull Road, Depot Road, 11th Street, 8th Avenue, NY 25, NY 110, Walt Whitman Shops
H30	Halesite; New York Avenue (NY 110) and Park Avenue	↔	South Huntington; Walt Whitman Shops	NY 110, NY 25A, Greenlawn Road, Broadway-Greenlawn Road, Centerport Road, NY 25, Pidgeon Hill Road, Wolf Hill Road Note: Some trips travel on NY 25A and Park Circle or on Greenlawn Road
H40	Northport; VA Medical Center and Middleville Road	↔	South Huntington; Walt Whitman Shops	NY 25, Elwood Road, 5th Avenue, Larkfield Road, Laurel Road, Main Street, NY 25A, Middleville Road

==== Paratransit ====
In accordance with the Americans with Disabilities Act, paratransit service is offered to those unable to utilize traditional buses.

=== Former routes ===
Route	Terminals		Major streets	History and notes
H4	Northport	Walt Whitman Mall	NY 110, NY 25, Broadway-Greenlawn Road, Pulaski Road, NY 25A	Partly follows the old Northport Traction Company line.; Rename to "H40", after January 2, 2013, route restructuring.
H6	Commack Plaza	Cold Spring Harbor	NY 25A, Greenlawn Road, Broadway-Greenlawn Road, Pulaski Road, Larkfield Road, NY 25.	Renamed H10 after the January 2, 2013 route restructuring.
H9	Walt Whitman Mall Loop			
Red	Huntington Station Feeder Route			
Blue	Huntington Station Feeder Route			
HART "Summer; Bus"	Huntington	Centerport Beach	NY 25A, Greenlawn Road, Centerport Road	Summer weekdays only.
H10 (old)	Walt Whitman Mall	Northport Dock		Saturday service only.
H11	Walt Whitman Mall	Dix Hills		Saturday service only.
H12	Walt Whitman Mall	Greenlawn Station		Saturday service only.

== Bus Fleet ==
=== Current fleet ===
Year	Model	Length	Width	Engine	Transmission	Fleet number	Total Number	Notes
2011	Gillig Low Floor Hybrid	29'	102"	Cummins ISL9	Allison H 40 EP hybrid system	808-810	3	
2015	ARBOC Spirit of Mobility	26'	96"	Duramax 6.6L Diesel		811-817	7	Used on Fixed Route Services
2024	ARBOC Spirit of Freedom	26'	96"	Vortec 6.6L Gasoline		818-821	4	Used on Fixed Route Services

=== Retired fleet ===
Year	Model	Length	Width	Engine	Fleet number	Total Number	Notes
1970	GMC T6H4521A	35'	96"	Detroit Diesel 6V71	101-103	3	Bought by the Town of Huntington and Northport Bus Company
1977	Flxible 35096-6-1	31'	96"	Detroit Diesel 6V71	201-211	11	
1984	Orion 01.507	36'8"	96"	Detroit Diesel 6v92	301-303	3	
19xx	Chance RT52	25'11"	96"		400's		
1993	Gillig Phantom 3096TB	30'	96"	Detroit Diesel 6v92	501-506	6	
1997	Gillig Phantom 3096TB	30'	96"	Detroit Diesel Series 50	601,602	2	Donated to Broome County Transit
1998	Gillig Phantom 3096TB	30'	96"	Detroit Diesel Series 50	603	1	
1999	Chance RT52	25'11"	96"		701-705	5	Used for paratransit, Saturday fixed route service, and Huntington Station Feeder Routes
2003	Gillig Phantom 3096TB	30'	96"	Detroit Diesel Series 50 EGR	801-807	7	#801, 806, 807 donated to Broome County Transit; 805 auctioned off November 2022

== See also ==
- Transportation on Long Island
- Long Beach Bus
