= Pulaski Road =

Pulaski Road may refer to:

- Pulaski Road (Chicago)
- County Route 11 (Suffolk County, New York)

== See also ==
- Pulaski Highway (disambiguation)
