= New York State Route 110 =

Highway on Long Island, New York

New York State Route 110
- Map of Suffolk County on Long Island with NY 110 highlighted in red

Route information
- Maintained by NYSDOT
- Length: 15.84 mi (25.49 km)
- Existed: 1930–present

Major junctions
- South end: NY 27A in Amityville
- NY 27 in Amityville; Southern State Parkway in East Farmingdale; NY 24 in East Farmingdale; I-495 in Melville; Northern State Parkway in Melville; NY 25 in Huntington Station; NY 25A in Huntington
- North end: Youngs Hill Road in Halesite

Location
- Country: United States
- State: New York
- Counties: Suffolk

Highway system
- New York Highways; Interstate; US; State; Reference; Parkways
← NY 109	→ NY 111

New York State Route 110 (NY 110) is a major north–south state highway along the western border of Suffolk County, New York. It runs between the village of Amityville in the town of Babylon and Halesite in the town of Huntington. NY 110 comes close to the Nassau County line several times in the town of Babylon, which is only surpassed by NY 108 in distance to the county line for a state highway.

== Route description ==
NY 110 begins at an intersection with NY 27A (Merrick Road) in the Suffolk County village of Amityville. Proceeding northward as Broadway, NY 110 crosses through downtown Amityville as a two-lane village street. Expanding to four lanes, the route intersects at-grade with County Route 12 (CR 12; Oak Street) before crossing under the Montauk Branch of the Long Island Rail Road, a block east of Amityville station. NY 110 continues north along Broadway, forking northwest at a junction with Albany Avenue. Passing Brunswick Hospital, the route intersects with the western terminus of CR 2 (Dixon Street) before entering a cloverleaf interchange with NY 27 (Sunrise Highway).

NY 110 continues into North Amityville, becoming a four-lane boulevard through the center of the hamlet. The route crosses through several commercial districts in North Amityville, proceeding northwest towards the Nassau County line. Bending northward alongside the county line, NY 110 enters an interchange with the Southern State Parkway (exit 32S–N), where the route becomes a six-lane arterial road and changes names to Broadhollow Road. NY 110 then expands to six lanes, intersecting with CR 47 (Main Street / Great Neck Road). Bending northeast and away from the county line, NY 110 continues as a six-lane arterial road, crossing through the town of Babylon into East Farmingdale.

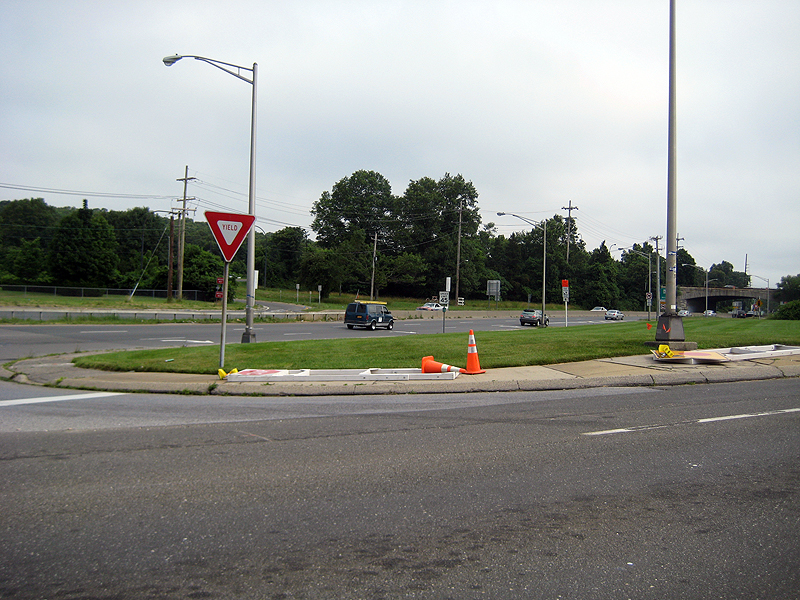
NY 110 as seen from Old Country Road in Melville. The Northern State Parkway is visible crossing over NY 110 in the distance

Entering East Farmingdale, NY 110 crosses over the Central Branch of the Long Island Rail Road and enters a large grade-separated interchange with NY 109 (Farmingdale Road) just west of Republic Airport. NY 110 continues north through Babylon as a six-lane arterial road past the runway of Republic Airport, passing a small campus of Molloy University. Entering Airport Plaza, the route continues north into an intersection with the eastern terminus of the western segment of NY 24 (Conklin Street). NY 110 continues north along Broad Hollow Road, going underneath the LIRR Main Line at the site of its former Republic station, then passing the campus of State University of New York at Farmingdale. Just north of the campus, the route leaves the town of Babylon, crossing into the town of Huntington.

Now in Huntington, NY 110 crosses into East Melville, passing through several commercial strips, entering exit 49S–N of the Long Island Expressway (I-495), a cloverleaf interchange. After the Long Island Expressway, NY 110 reduces from six lanes to four, intersecting with CR 3 (Pinelawn Road). The route crosses several streets in at-grade junctions, crossing Old Country Road before changing names to Walt Whitman Road. After the name change, NY 110 crosses into an interchange with the Northern State Parkway (exit 40) and becomes a four-lane boulevard. Continuing north along Walt Whitman Road, NY 110 proceeds north through a commercial strip in Melville. The route proceeds north as a four-lane boulevard for several miles, crossing West Hills County Park and past Walt Whitman Shops. Just north of Walt Whitman Shops, NY 110 enters an at-grade intersection with NY 25 (West Jericho Turnpike) in the hamlet of South Huntington.

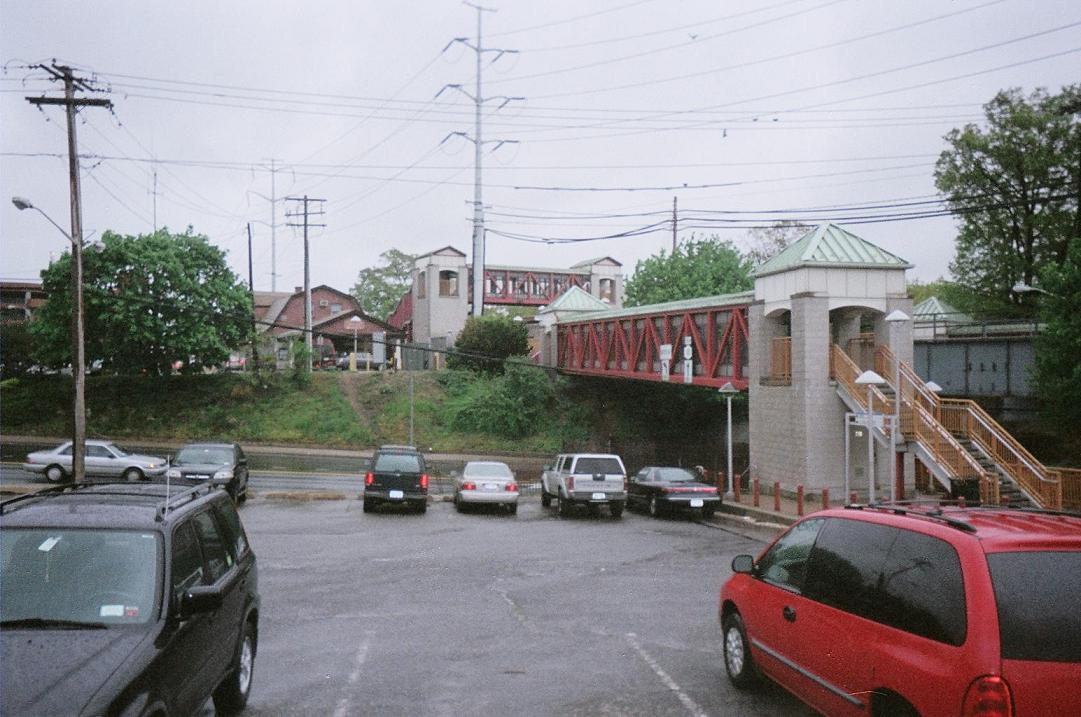
NY 110 as seen from the parking lot across from the Huntington LIRR station. Pedestrian bridges crossing the roadway connect both of the station's parking lots

North of NY 25, NY 110 shrinks to a two-lane road, crossing through South Huntington as Walt Whitman Road until the junction with New York Avenue, where that name terminates. NY 110 then proceeds northwest along New York Avenue, crossing through Huntington Station through a long commercial strip. Crossing through the village, NY 110 intersects with CR 11 (Pulaski Road). Passing the Huntington Public Library, NY 110 crosses under the Port Jefferson Branch of the Long Island Railroad and the Huntington station. Expanding back to four lanes, the route continues through Huntington, bending northwest at Henry Street. NY 110 crosses northwest, passing a large shopping center.

Reducing itself back to two lanes, NY 110 passes Huntington Rural Cemetery, crossing into Huntington Village. Now a two-lane commercial street, the route crosses past several blocks of businesses, intersecting with NY 25A (Main Street) before turning northeast out of the downtown section. Now in the Fort Hill section of Huntington, NY 110 proceeds northeast along New York Avenue, soon crossing back into Huntington Village. Passing Mill Dam Park, NY 110 encounters two roundabouts, one of which intersects with the northern terminus of CR 35 (Mill Dam Road). Crossing through the Southdown section of Huntington, NY 110 bends northeast alongside Huntington Harbor, a part of Huntington Bay. Crossing into the hamlet of Halesite, NY 110 intersects with Youngs Hill Road, where the designation terminates.

== History ==
The entirety of NY 110 was assigned as part of the 1930 renumbering. In May 1936, the Long Island Tercentenary Committee proposed a new name for the stretch of NY 110 in the area of the Walt Whitman Birthplace, whose preservation was also proposed in 1936 due to the lack of a "suitable" memorial to the famed poet on Long Island. On March 12, 1940, the town of Huntington approved the measure, renaming a 4-mile (6.4 km) stretch of Huntington–Amityville Road as Walt Whitman Road.

In March 1953, work began on widening NY 110 between NY 25 (Jericho Turnpike) to the outskirts of Amityville. This new project, which was to cost $1 million (1953 USD), would expand the corridor to four lanes from two, as the road had already become the most heavily traveled section of routes in Suffolk County. In 1970, the alignment of NY 110 was proposed by the Nassau-Suffolk Regional Planning Board to be replaced with a new expressway between NY 27 (Sunrise Highway) and NY 25. The new expressway was proposed to help work with traffic projected to increase along the corridor from 1970 to 1985. The new expressway would replace the two–four lane-wide NY 110 corridor with six lanes.

Under the Long Island Transportation Plan, proposed in 2000, engineers suggested that NY 110 should be expanded to six lanes between the junction with NY 109 in Amityville to NY 27 along with a third lane between NY 27 and the Northern State Parkway. One of the engineers involved in the project stated that if NY 110 had more office building development, a light rail line would probably be constructed, but the engineer mentioned that the development was unlikely.

On June 21, 2013, the New York State Department of Transportation announced that construction had begun on the stretch of NY 110 between the Long Island Expressway (I-495) and the Northern State Parkway. The construction would become a makeover to connect two previously completed reconstruction projects to help the roadway become ADA-accessible, upgrade the sewage systems, resurface the pavement along the alignment along with new traffic light systems and landscaping work. Construction of the new $22.5 million project would be completed by the end of 2014.

NY 110's interchange with the Northern State was completed on November 13, 2013. The project, which cost $60 million, included demolishing the old Northern State bridge, expanding NY 110 to three travel lanes and building a new bridge that was designed with parts of the old bridge to keep Robert Moses's styles intact.

=== Former segments ===
In Melville and South Huntington, two former segments of NY 110, both named Old Walt Whitman Road, run parallel to the route along the west side of the road. The northern segment in South Huntington is home to the Walt Whitman Birthplace. In between, a third former segment exists as Amityville Road, located north of the Northern State Parkway.

The Melville section of Walt Whitman Road goes from what is now Duryea Road to a dead end between Old Country Road and the Northern State Parkway. The realigned segment is on the former right-of-way for the Huntington Railroad Trolley line. The South Huntington section runs between Overhill Road and Livingston Street.

== Major intersections ==
The entire route is in Suffolk County.

Location	mi	km	Destinations	Notes
Amityville	0.00	0.00	NY 27A (Merrick Road)	Southern terminus; former NY 27
Amityville	1.14	1.83	NY 27 – New York, Montauk	Cloverleaf interchange
North Amityville–East Farmingdale line	2.60	4.18	Southern State Parkway – New York, East Islip	Exits 32S-N on Southern State Parkway
East Farmingdale	3.72	5.99	NY 109 – Hempstead, Babylon	Cloverleaf interchange
East Farmingdale	4.83	7.77	NY 24 west – Farmingdale	Eastern terminus of NY 24
Melville	7.66– 7.90	12.33– 12.71	I-495 – New York, Riverhead	Exits 49S-N on I-495
Melville–West Hills line	8.86	14.26	Northern State Parkway – New York, Hauppauge	Exit 40 on Northern State Parkway
South Huntington–Huntington Station line	11.17	17.98	NY 25 – New York, Smithtown, West Hills	
Community of Huntington	14.49	23.32	NY 25A (Main Street) – Cold Spring Harbor, Northport	
Halesite	15.2	24.5	CR 35 south (Park Avenue)	Roundabout; south end of CR 35 overlap
Halesite	15.3	24.6	CR 35 north (Mill Dam Road)	Roundabout; north end of CR 35 overlap
Halesite	15.84	25.49	Youngs Hill Road	Northern terminus
1.000 mi = 1.609 km; 1.000 km = 0.621 mi: Concurrency terminus
