= South Shore Mall (New York) =

- Location: Bay Shore, New York
- Coordinates: 40.740242°N 73.245969°W
- Opened: August 30, 1963; 63 years ago
- Developer: R.H. Macy & Company
- Manager: Namdar Realty Group
- Owner: Namdar Realty Group
- Num. of stores: 99
- Num. of anchor tenants: 4
- Floor area: 1,165,000 sq ft (108,200 m^{2})
- Floors: 1 (2 in anchors)
- Public transit: Suffolk County Transit: 7
- Website: SouthShoreMallRealty.com

South Shore Mall (formerly Westfield South Shore) is a super-regional shopping mall in Bay Shore in Suffolk County, Long Island, New York, in the United States. The mall is owned by Namdar Realty Group, and has 1,165,000 square feet (108,232 m^{2}) of gross leasable area.

== History ==
The mall was opened in 1963 by the R.H. Macy Company, which opened the 3-level, 318,800-square-foot (29,620 m^{2}) Macy's as the original anchor. The open-air, 70-store first phase of the mall was completed by 1967, and originally included stores such as Record Town, Woolworth's, Lerner Shops, Bond's, and JCPenney, which was the first in-line JCPenney location in the New York area at the time. The mall's Loews Theaters location opened around the same time. In the mid-1970s, there was also a section of the mall divided into an area named "Captree Corners", a bazaar-like setup of small stores clustered into a village-like mini-mall area.

The mall was fully enclosed in 1975. In December 1986, the mall's ownership was sold to the Westfield Group for $85 million. Shortly after the change in ownership, plans for an expansion were underway. The renovation/expansion was underway by 1996, which gutted the northern end of the center, which was replaced with 40,000 square feet (3,700 m^{2}) of new retail area, along with a newly built, three-level (216,300 ft^{2}) Sears, which opened in September 1997. A two-level (120,000 ft^{2}) Lord & Taylor eventually opened in late 1998, replacing the former Woolworth. On March 4, 2012, Macy's closed their original anchor store. The building was demolished and Macy's moved to a new an adjacent, newly built anchor store, which opened on August 14, 2013. In May 2015, it was announced that the Sears anchor store would close. On June 16, 2016, Dick's Sporting Goods announced that it would remodel the former Sears anchor store.

On August 27, 2020, it was announced that all Lord & Taylor department stores would permanently close, due to the economic impact of the COVID-19 pandemic.

On January 3, 2023, Unibail-Rodamco-Westfield sold this mall along with Westfield Trumbull in Trumbull, Connecticut for a combined deal of $196 million, or roughly $100 million each, to Namdar Realty Group.

== See also ==
- Sunrise Mall (New York) – A former mall in adjacent Nassau County developed by R. H. Macy & Company and later owned by the Westfield Group.
- Smith Haven Mall
- Walt Whitman Shops
