= South Huntington, New York =

- Hamlet and census-designated place
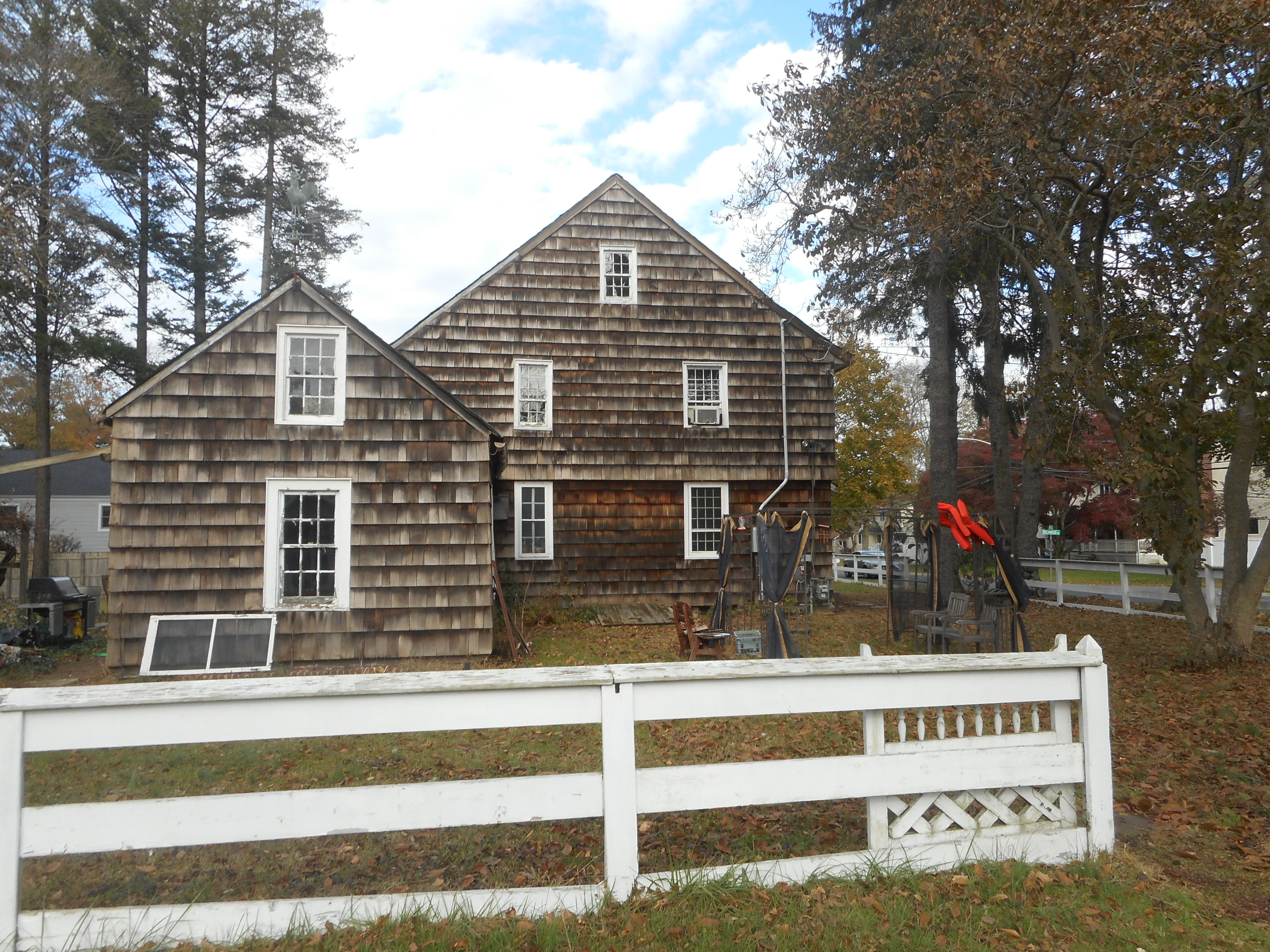
- The Ezra Carll Homestead – one of South Huntington's best-known landmarks

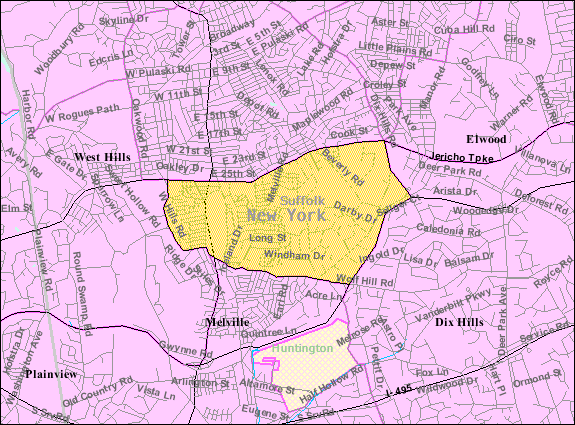
- U.S. Census map

- Location on Long Island Location within the state of New York
- Coordinates: 40°49′21″N 73°24′8″W
- Country: United States
- State: New York
- County: Suffolk
- Town: Huntington

Area
  - Total: 3.42 sq mi (8.85 km^{2})
  - Land: 3.42 sq mi (8.85 km^{2})
  - Water: 0 sq mi (0.00 km^{2})
- Elevation: 207 ft (63 m)

Population (2020)
  - Total: 9,561
  - Density: 2,800/sq mi (1,080.9/km^{2})
- Time zone: UTC-5 (Eastern (EST))
  - Summer (DST): UTC-4 (EDT)
- ZIP code: 11746
- Area codes: 631, 934
- FIPS code: 36-69254
- GNIS feature ID: 0965788

South Huntington is an affluent hamlet and census-designated place (CDP) located within the Town of Huntington in Suffolk County, on Long Island, in New York, United States. It is considered part of the Greater Huntington area, which is anchored by Huntington. The population was 9,561 at the time of the 2020 census.

Residents of South Huntington have a Huntington Station postal address.

== History ==
South Huntington is the birthplace of Walt Whitman, and the Walt Whitman High School is nearby. It is also home to St. Anthony's High School, Walt Whitman High School and the South Huntington Public Library.

The construction of the Walt Whitman Shops – previously known as the Walt Whitman Shopping Center – was announced in 1956, after the department store chain Abraham & Straus purchased 45 acres (18 ha) in South Huntington that year to build a shopping mall and parking lot. An A & S store would be built as the centerpiece of the mall. The groundbreaking ceremony for the shopping center took place on April 20, 1961. The first store to open, on March 28, 1962, was Abraham & Straus, followed by Macy's on September 18, 1962. The official opening for the entire shopping center was in November 1962. It was the first enclosed shopping center on Long Island. The mall had 75 stores, lighted fountains, and a reflecting pool. The parking lot had spaces for 5,000 cars. Renovations at the mall took place in 1998, including changes to the main concourse and an elevated parking deck. Also in this time period, three new department stores were added. Bloomingdale's opened on August 5, 1998 followed by Lord & Taylor on November 11, 1998. Saks Fifth Avenue opened its doors on March 11, 1999. A second renovation was completed in November 2013. This included adding 70,000 square feet to the facility as well as doing exterior remodeling. A statue of Walt Whitman was also added. As of 2026, the mall was owned by Simon Property Group.

== Geography ==
According to the United States Census Bureau, the CDP has a total area of 3.4 square miles (8.8 km^{2}), all land.

South Huntington is assigned to the Huntington Station post office by the United States Postal Service, along with the Huntington Station, NY 11746 ZIP Code.

== Economy ==
Across from the Walt Whitman Birthplace State Historic Site on Walt Whitman Road (NY 110) are the Walt Whitman Shops – a large shopping mall owned by Simon Property Group.

== Demographics ==
Historical population
Census	Pop.	Note	%±
2000	9,465		—
2010	9,422		−0.5%
2020	9,561		1.5%
U.S. Decennial Census

As of the census of 2000, there were 9,465 people, 3,299 households, and 2,533 families residing in the CDP. The population density was 2,802.0 inhabitants per square mile (1,081.9/km^{2}). There were 3,379 housing units at an average density of 1,000.3 per square mile (386.2/km^{2}). The racial makeup of the CDP was 93.47% White, 0.85% African American, 0.06% Native American, 3.55% Asian, 0.82% from other races, and 1.25% from two or more races. Hispanic or Latino of any race were 3.76% of the population.

There were 3,299 households, out of which 32.3% had children under the age of 18 living with them, 64.2% were married couples living together, 9.4% had a female householder with no husband present, and 23.2% were non-families. 17.7% of all households were made up of individuals, and 7.3% had someone living alone who was 65 years of age or older. The average household size was 2.77 and the average family size was 3.14.

In the CDP, the population was spread out, with 22.4% under the age of 18, 5.1% from 18 to 24, 31.8% from 25 to 44, 24.1% from 45 to 64, and 16.6% who were 65 years of age or older. The median age was 40 years. For every 100 females, there were 93.8 males. For every 100 females age 18 and over, there were 90.0 males.

The median income for a household in the CDP was $177,950, and the median income for a family was $184,828. Males had a median income of $60,440 versus $41,867 for females. The per capita income for the CDP was $34,011. About 3.3% of families and 4.4% of the population were below the poverty line, including 3.5% of those under age 18 and 8.9% of those age 65 or over.

Median real estate property taxes paid for housing units with mortgages in 2009: $6,918 (1.6%) Median real estate property taxes paid for housing units with no mortgage in 2009: $6,446 (1.6%)

== Education ==
=== Schools ===
==== Public ====
South Huntington Union Free School District's Walt Whitman High School in 2024 was ranked a top three public high school in Suffolk County, NY. South Huntington Union Free School District Ranked in 2024 in the top six Suffolk County School Districts.

Funding for the 48 classroom Walt Whitman High School was approved in February 1950. A new high school was needed because of the large population growth in the school district. The cost of over $3,100,000 included purchasing 32 acres in South Huntington. Capacity for the school was set at 1,500. Groundbreaking took place on March 14, 1955. The school opened on Sept. 6, 1956.

Enrollment for the 2015–16 school year for Walt Whitman High School was 1,898.

==== Private ====
St. Anthony's High School opened on Sept. 12, 1984 at the former site of Holy Family High School. Formerly an all-boys high school in Smithtown, St. Anthony's student body was moved to the new location in South Huntington when the Diocese of Rockville Centre decided to close Holy Family High School. The major factor for the closure of Holy Family was declining enrollment. The move of St. Anthony's to South Huntington sparked protests by parents and students.

=== Library ===
The 49,000 square foot South Huntington Public Library, located at 145 Pidgeon Hill Road, opened to the public on July 24, 2004. The construction of the library was funded by an $11.9 million bond referendum passed on December 5, 2000 by a margin of 1,532 to 1,493. Reasons for construction of the new library included need for additional space to house the library's collections, additional computers and updated technology for patrons and a larger community room for programs. An added feature on the grounds of the library is an outdoor garden with patio seating.

The library was built on the site of the former Pidgeon Hill Elementary School.

== Transportation ==
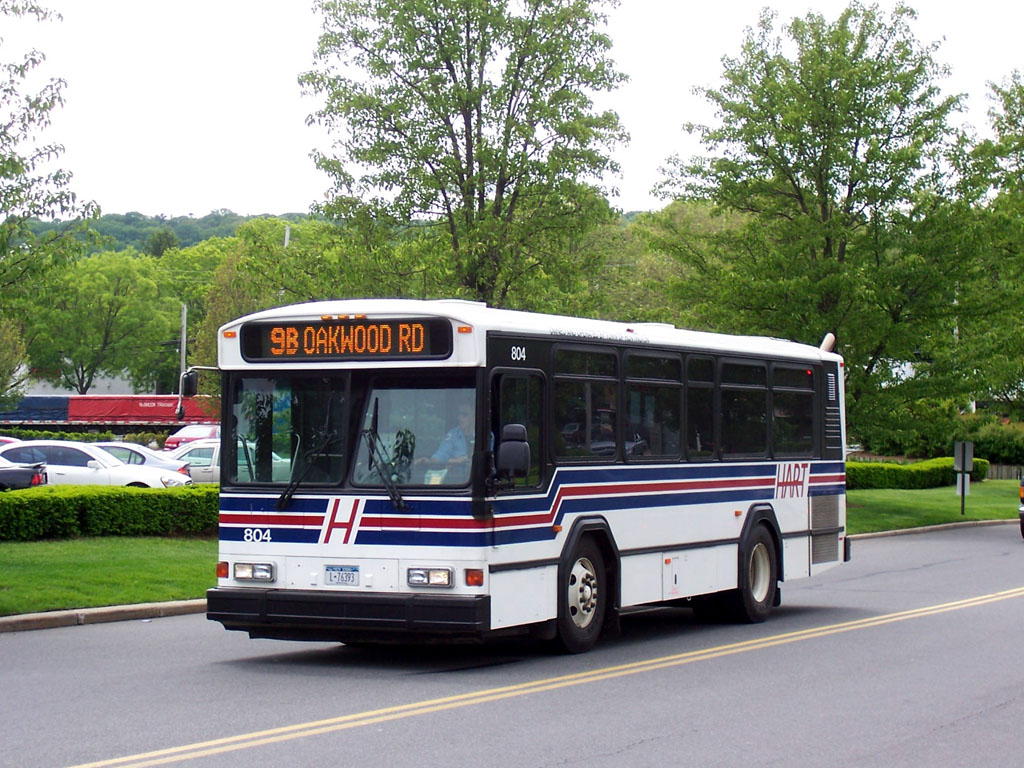
A HART bus at the Walt Whitman Shops in 2005

The Walt Whitman Shops – located within South Huntington – is a major hub for bus routes in the area. As of 2026, the following bus routes serve the hamlet at the mall's bus hub:

- Suffolk County Transit Routes 1, 3, and 6
- Huntington Area Rapid Transit Routes H20, H30, and H40
- Nassau Inter-County Express Routes n79 and n79x

== See also ==
- Half Hollow Hills, New York
- Huntington Station, New York
- West Hills, New York
