= Pulaski Highway =

Pulaski Highway may refer to:

- Part of Interstate 65 in Indiana
- Interstate 790
- Part of U.S. Route 12 in Michigan
- Part of U.S. Route 40 in Maryland
- Part of U.S. Route 40 in Delaware
- County Route 6 (Orange County, New York)

== See also ==
- Pulaski Skyway
- Pulaski Road (disambiguation)
