= First Congregational Church of New Village =

Historic church in New York, United States

- U.S. National Register of Historic Places
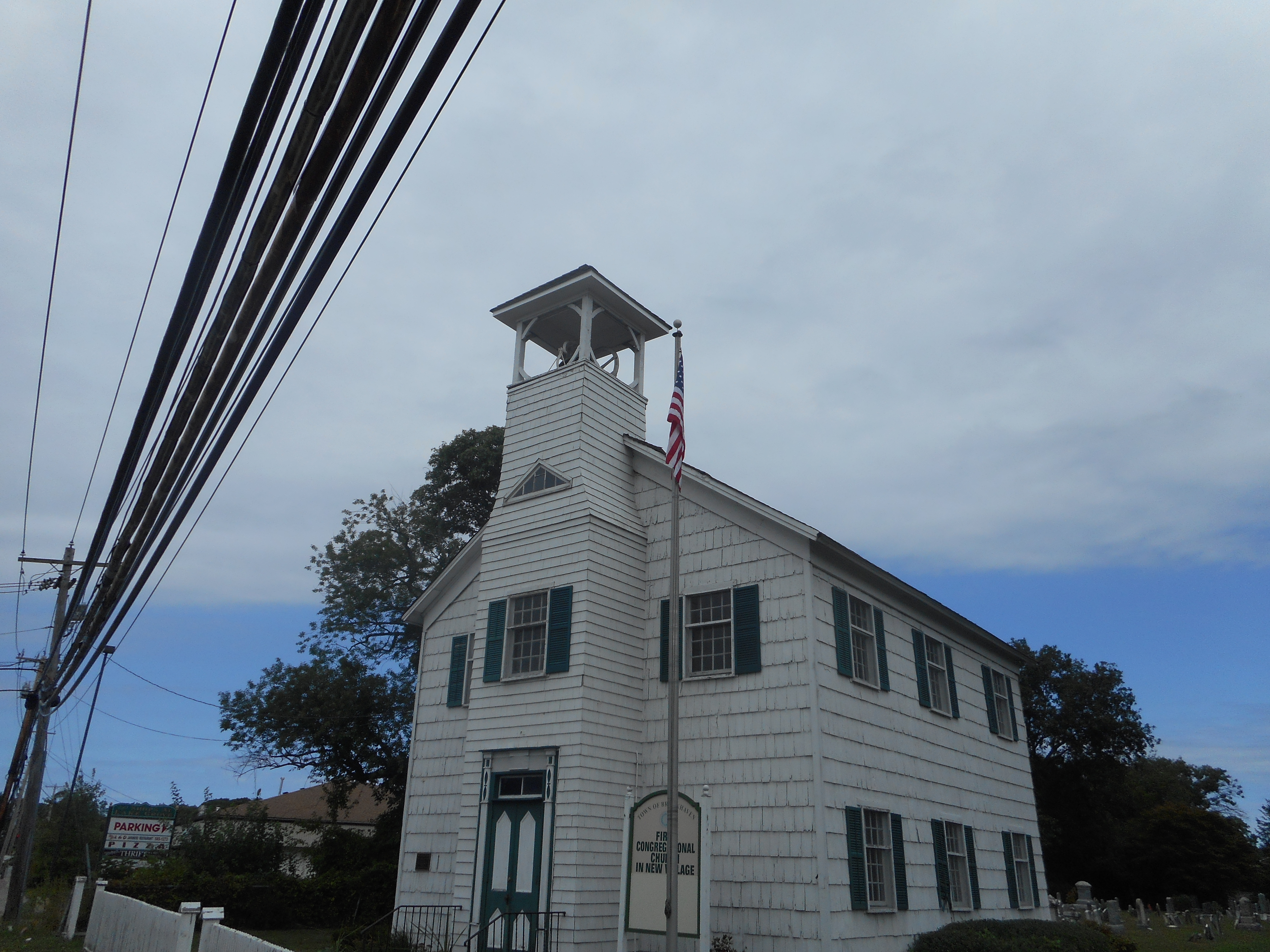
- View of the church from the westbound NY 25 sidewalk, September 20, 2015

- Location within New York Location within the United States
- Location: N. side of Middle Country Rd. W. of Elliot Ave., Lake Grove, New York
- Coordinates: 40°51′35″N 73°6′37″W
- Area: 1.4 acres (0.57 ha)
- Built: 1818
- Architectural style: Federal
- NRHP reference No.: 02000361
- Added to NRHP: April 11, 2002

First Congregational Church of New Village is a historic church on the north side of Middle Country Road, west of Elliot Avenue in Lake Grove, New York, United States.

The building was likely constructed in 1818, with some sources saying with the original intent of being of a union meeting house.

The congregation was formed in 1815, with the original title "Third Congregational Church of Brookhaven", and its first pastor was Jacob Corwin. On March 5, 1845, the church was incorporated as the "First Congregational Church of New Village."

In 1949 the church withdrew from the Congregational denomination, and it became an independent evangelical church; self-governed by its Board of Elders and Deacons. The congregation of the church moved to a new and larger facility in 1961, and the property was taken over by the Town of Brookhaven around 1970. It was added to the National Register of Historic Places in 2002.

Today the church is known as New Village Church, and is located a block from the old church building at 3 Wildwood Street, Lake Grove, NY.

The church is depicted on the Lake Grove village seal. "New Village", however, is the former name of the hamlet of Centereach, whose boundary now lies a few blocks east of the church's location.
