= Martin's (New York) =

Specialty apparel retailer in the New York metropolitan area

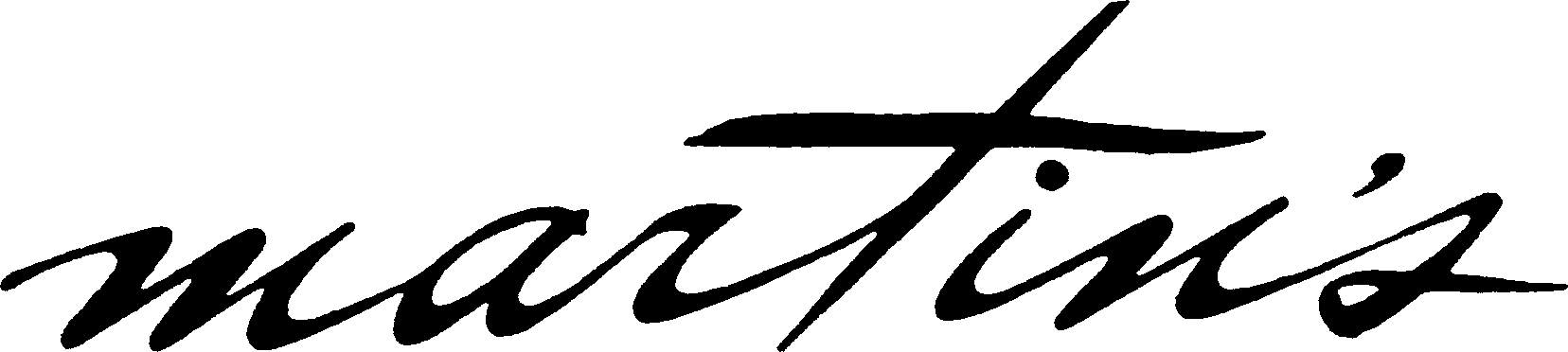
- Industry: Fashion retailer
- Founded: 1904
- Defunct: 1977 (stores closed later)
- Fate: Sold, stores later changed names/closed
- Headquarters: Brooklyn, New York, U.S.
- Key people: Hyman Zeitz, Zeitz family

Martin's was a specialty apparel retailer in the New York metropolitan area, with its flagship location on Fulton Street in Brooklyn. It grew to six stores by the mid 1970s, before being sold to the operator of Times Square Stores in 1977.

== History ==
=== A Store Grows In Brooklyn ===
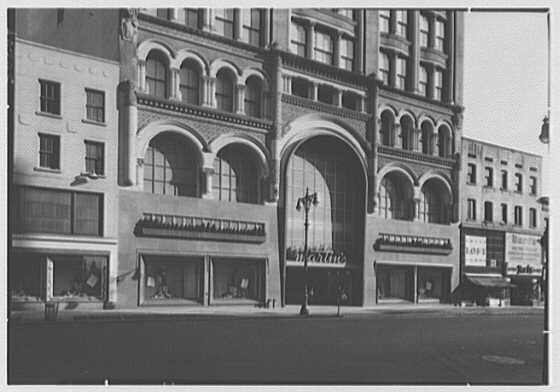
Martin's Fulton Street storefront with updated exterior, February 1947, Gottscho-Schleisner Collection (Library of Congress)

The history of Martin's dates back to at least 1903. Hyman Zeitz (c. 1860-1930), who emigrated to the United States in 1882, opened a coat and suit department in an existing blouse shop called Martin's at the corner of Fulton and Bridge Street in Brooklyn, New York. He eventually bought out the owner. The business gradually expanded, and in 1924 moved next door into the seven-story Offerman Building. In 1930, Hyman Zeitz died, and his son Fred. J. Zeitz took over as president (a position he held for over 35 years).

In 1947, a modernized entrance to the Offerman Building, designed by architect Morris Lapidus, was completed, replacing the "gimcracks of the victorian era" with modern "simplicity."

=== Suburban Expansion ===
In the 1950s, Martin's began to expand and open additional locations in the New York suburbs. The first was a Garden City location in Nassau County, at Franklin and Ninth Street, which opened in April 1952. A Babylon store in Suffolk County opened in August 1956, in the Great South Bay Shopping Center, followed by a Huntington location (in the Big H Shopping Center) in August 1962. At 75,000 square feet (7,000 m^{2}) and containing a 500-seat community room for civic meetings, the Huntington location was the largest branch store at the time, though still much smaller than the 225,000 square feet (20,900 m^{2}) of the Brooklyn store.

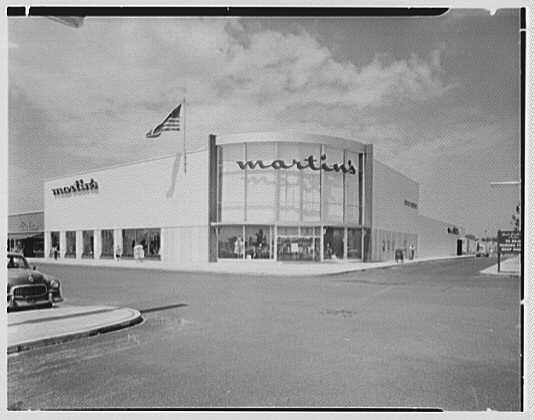
Martin's Babylon Store exterior, August 1956, Gottscho-Schleisner Collection (Library of Congress)

In 1966, Hyman Zeitz' grandson Wilbur Levin took over as president of the chain, though Fred and brother Harry remained active in senior roles. In a profile of the store done that year by The New York Times, Martin's was described as an "oasis of calm, even understatement" in the "hubbub" of Fulton Street, located almost directly across the street from Abraham & Straus, and discount stores J.W. Mays and E. J. Korvette also nearby. The business was reported to have annual sales of $25 million, $15 million from the Fulton Street location. In 1968, the Times glowingly described the store: "(Fulton) street’s most prestigious unit, not only does more bridal business than any other store in the United States, but it is today one of the largest family-owned specialty stores in the country," and "which many consider a Fifth Avenue outpost because of its emphasis on better price and high quality."

In August 1969, Martin's opened its fifth store in the Smith Haven Mall in the more eastern suburbs of Suffolk County, its first interior mall location.

=== Decline and Sale ===
In 1972, president Wilbur Levin left Martin's to move into the banking industry, and another Zeitz grandson, Robert Rosenthal, took the reins. At the time, Levin reported that the stores "were doing well" and that his career change could be made "without disrupting Martin's."

Although a sixth location was opened in the new Riverside Square Mall in Hackensack, New Jersey in early 1977, profits for the still family-held company had steadily declined during the 1970s. In October 1977, with reported annual sales of $30 million, Martin's was sold for an undisclosed amount of cash to the Seedman Merchandising Group, operator of Times Square Stores. Rosenthal was announced to be continuing as president, but left the next year.

In 1979, the Fulton Street store was closed as a result of the "long term unprofitability" of the location. Obliquely referencing the change in fortunes in the shopping district, it was reported that "the Martin's store in Brooklyn, which for many years had catered to the borough's affluent, 'was no longer related to the surrounding shopping area.'" After that pivotal event, within a few years, the remaining Martin's closed or changed names.

The Offerman Building in Brooklyn was designated as a New York City Landmark in 2005.
