= Walt Whitman Shops =

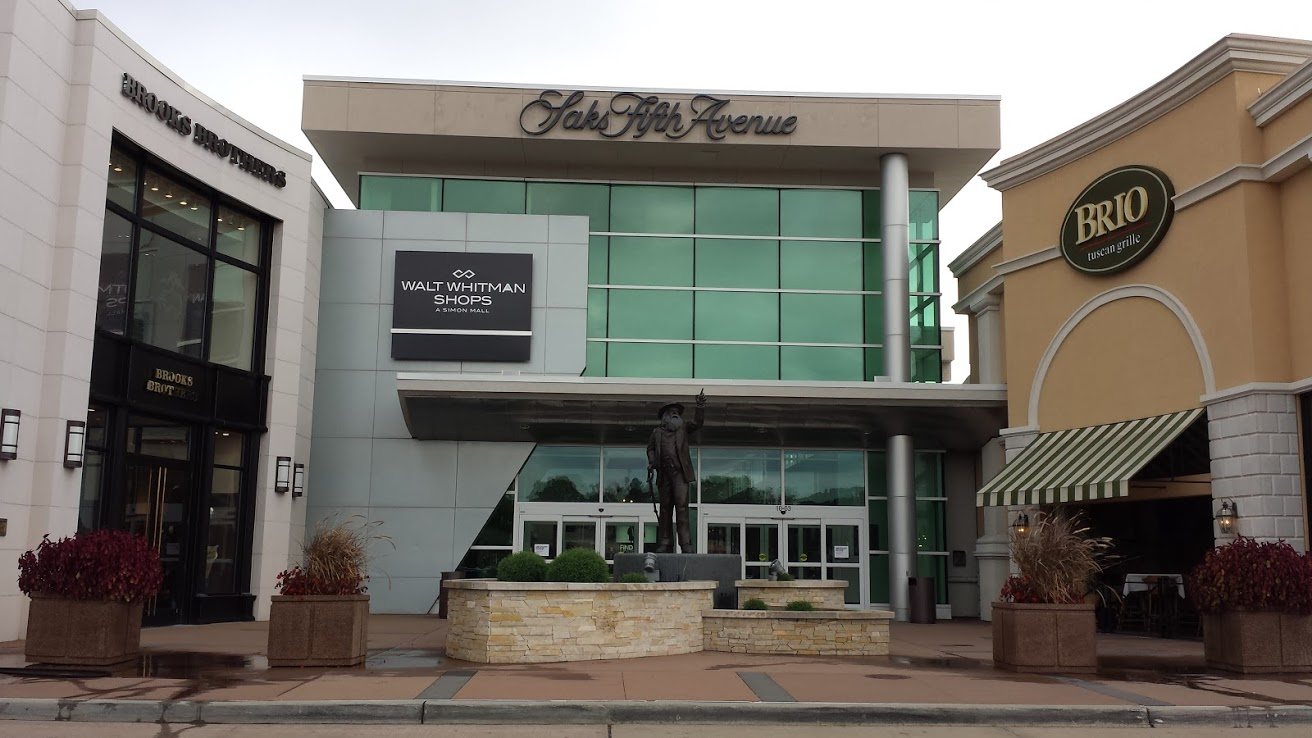
- The Walt Whitman statue in front of Walt Whitman Shops
- Location: 160 Walt Whitman Rd, Huntington Station, NY, 11746; South Huntington, New York
- Coordinates: 40.8223°N 73.4097°W
- Opened: November 23, 1962; 63 years ago
- Owner: Simon Property Group
- Architect: Welton Becket
- Num. of stores: 105
- Num. of anchor tenants: 2
- Floor area: 1,089,350 sq ft (101,204 m^{2})
- Floors: 1
- Parking: 5,043 spaces
- Public transit: Suffolk County Transit: 1, 3, 6 Huntington Area Rapid Transit: H20, H30, H40; Nassau Inter-County Express: n79, n79x
- Website: simon.com/mall/walt-whitman-shops

Walt Whitman Shops (formerly known as Walt Whitman Mall) is a shopping mall in the hamlet of South Huntington, New York, on Long Island. The mall features the traditional retailers Macy's and Bloomingdale's. The mall is named for the poet Walt Whitman due to the close proximity to his birthplace, a state historic site, located near the mall.

The mall is owned and managed by Simon Property Group, one of the largest developers of shopping malls in the United States.

== History ==
=== Walt Whitman Shopping Center ===
Built as New York's first indoor shopping mall, the facility cost $20 million at included 75 stores. It opened around anchors R.H. Macy & Company and Abraham & Straus in November 1962. It was the first time both companies directly competed with each other in the same location.

The Walt Whitman Shopping Center, as it was called then, was built by the Winston-Muss Corporation and featured a Japanese garden, aviary, and sculpted mobile based on the poetry of Walt Whitman. By January 1963, the facility was fully rented. In May, a single-screen movie theater opened, operated by Century.

=== Walt Whitman Mall ===
By the early 1970s, the location was being referred to as the Walt Whitman Mall. Winston-Muss sold the mall to N.K. Winston, Inc. in 1973, who sold it to Corporate Property Investors three years later.

On November 13, 1984, a fire destroyed seven stores, damaged 25 others, and collapsed part of the roof. It took seven fire companies four hours to get the blaze under control; 13 people were treated for minor injuries. Two thirds of the stores were able to reopen soon after, while the rest were sealed off for repair.

On May 16, 1991, a fire killed two people and injured 36 others. It was the fourth fire at the McCrory's location in six months. In 1993, a McCrory's worker pleaded guilty to tossing a lit cigarette into a display of silk flowers set on a block of styrofoam, causing significant damage to the store and killing two of his coworkers, aged 20 and 27. The store never reopened.

By 1995, CPI was planning a massive, $50 million expansion project that would grow the mall 30% by adding a second floor, 80 stores, food court, multiscreen cinema, and two new garages. However, the plan faced significant protest from local homeowners.

When Federated Department Stores merged A&S into Macy's in 1995, the Walt Whitman Mall became the only location in the country to have two Macy's storefronts. The original Macy's store would remain opened well into 1996 but eventually closed by 1997. Bloomingdale's was brought in 1998 to serve as a new anchor store where the first Macy's was.

In February 1998, Simon DeBartolo Group purchased CPI and took control of the mall. Simon completed a $85 million renovation in March 1999, adding 32 stores, marble floor tiles, vaulted ceilings, skylights, and a glass domed center court to expand the mall to one million square feet (92,900 m^{2}). Programmable advertising displays and traffic monitoring features were also installed. Walt Whitman's poem "Leaves of Grass" was etched onto the outside of the building. Saks Fifth Avenue opened in March 1999, joining new tenants Williams Sonoma, L'Occitane, Sephora, and Brooks Brothers. By June 2000, sales had increased by 18%, putting it ahead of the national sales average. In July, Legal Seafoods opened a standalone location next to the mall. The Whitman Theater closed in 2002. In May 2003, an Apple Store opened at the mall.

=== Walt Whitman Shops ===
In February 2012, Simon received approval for another expansion project that would add 72,000 square feet (6,700 m^{2}) to the upper and lower levels of the mall and 30 new storefronts. Indoor renovations were completed in summer 2013 and the Walt Whitman Shops, as it was now called, was unveiled in November. The walls featuring quotes from "Leaves of Grass" were removed and replaced by a bronze statue of Walt Whitman at the Mall's new main entrance.

In August 2013, an Urban Outfitters opened. On February 22, 2014, a carbon monoxide leak at Legal Seafoods killed one person and sickened 28 others. All three restaurants in the complex (Legal Sea Foods, The Cheesecake Factory, and Panera Bread) were evacuated. The leak was blamed on a faulty water heater pipe. The restaurant permanently closed at the end of the year. On March 2, 2016, 10 people were hospitalized after Panera Bread suffered another carbon monoxide leak that originated from the construction site where Legal Seafoods used to be.

On March 19, 2020, the Walt Whitman Shops closed due to the ongoing COVID-19 pandemic and didn't reopen until July 10. On August 27, 2020, it was announced that the Lord & Taylor would chain would close, as a direct result of the COVID-19 pandemic. In 2023, plans were announced to convert the Lord & Taylor anchor store to medical offices.

In 2025, a Garage store and a Mavi Jeans will open at the mall.

On March 6, 2026, Saks Global announced the closure of 12 Saks Fifth Avenue and 3 Neiman Marcus locations nationwide, including the Saks store at Walt Whitman Shops.

== Transportation ==
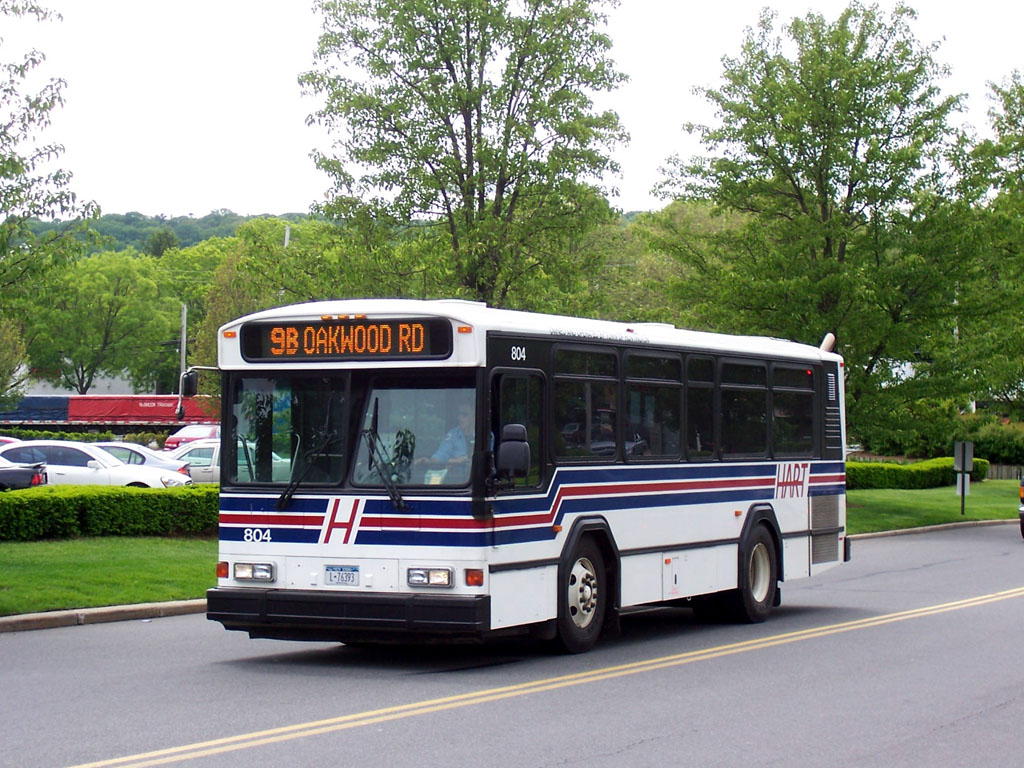
A HART bus at the Walt Whitman Shops in 2005

The Walt Whitman Shops serves as a major hub for bus routes in the area, operated by Huntington Area Rapid Transit, Nassau Inter-County Express, and Suffolk County Transit.

As of 2026, the following bus routes serve the Walt Whitman Shops:

- Suffolk County Transit Routes 1, 3, and 6
- Huntington Area Rapid Transit Routes H20, H30, and H40
- Nassau Inter-County Express Routes n79 and n79x

== See also ==
- Roosevelt Field (shopping mall)
- Smith Haven Mall
