= Lake Grove, New York =

Village in Suffolk County, New York

- Village
- Incorporated Village of Lake Grove
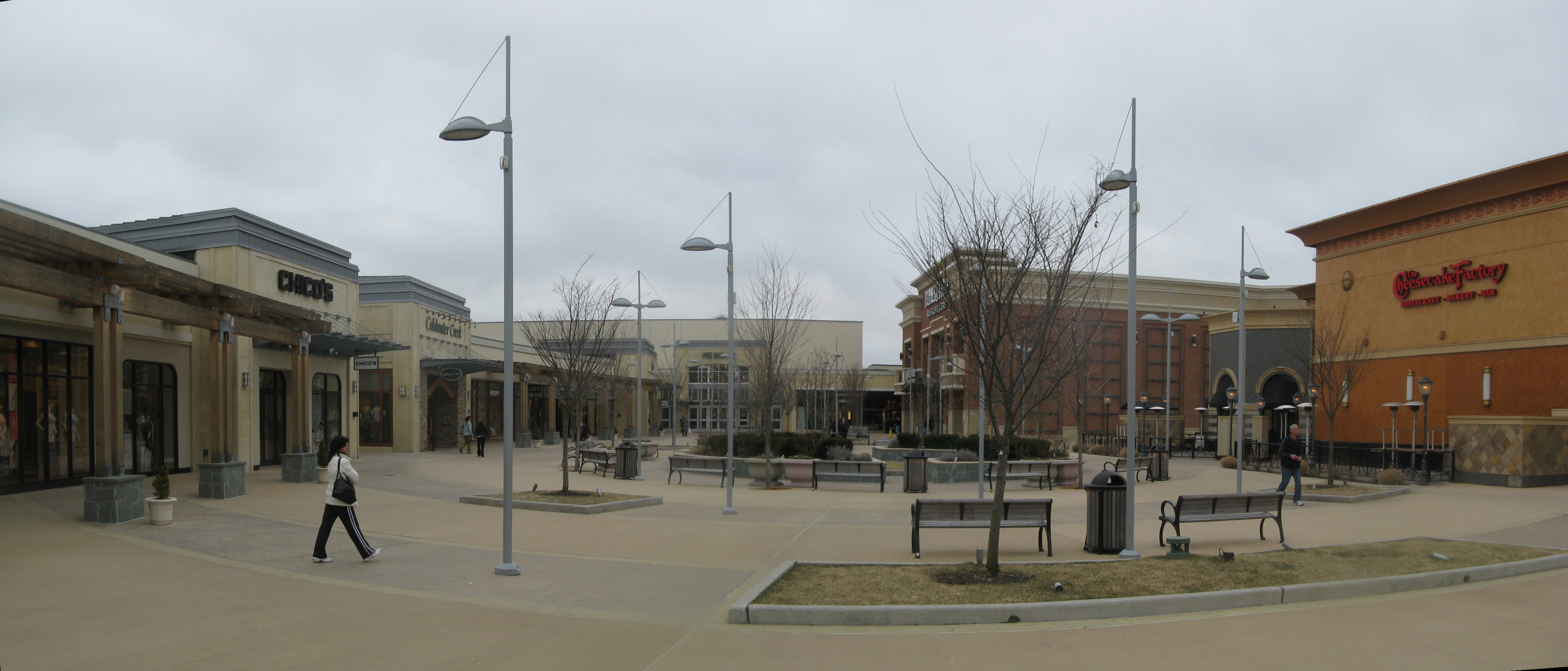
- Smith Haven Mall

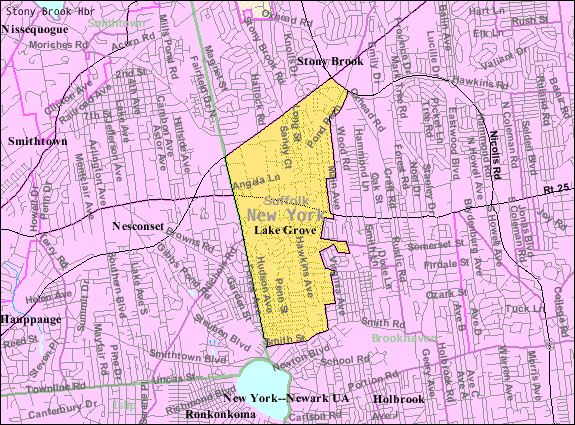
- U.S. Census Map

- Location within the state of New York Lake Grove, New York (New York) Lake Grove, New York (the United States)
- Coordinates: 40°51′30″N 73°7′0″W
- Country: United States
- State: New York
- County: Suffolk
- Town: Brookhaven
- Incorporated: September 9, 1968

Government
  - Mayor: Robert Scottaline
  - Deputy Mayor: Richard J. Cohen

Area
  - Total: 2.95 sq mi (7.63 km^{2})
  - Land: 2.95 sq mi (7.63 km^{2})
  - Water: 0 sq mi (0.00 km^{2})
- Elevation: 118 ft (36 m)

Population (2020)
  - Total: 11,072
  - Density: 3,757.9/sq mi (1,450.92/km^{2})
- Time zone: UTC−05:00 (Eastern Time Zone)
  - Summer (DST): UTC−04:00
- ZIP Code: 11755
- Area codes: 631, 934
- FIPS code: 36-40530
- GNIS feature ID: 0954916
- Website: lakegroveny.gov

Lake Grove is a village in the Town of Brookhaven in Suffolk County, New York, United States. As of the 2020 census, Lake Grove had a population of 11,072.

== History ==
The area of Lake Grove was settled in the early 18th century along Middle Country Road, which was then part of the Old Kings Highway, originally a Native American footpath. The community's first church building, built in 1818, was the First Congregational Church of New Village. Placed on the National Register of Historic Places in 2002, the building has been preserved and is depicted on the village seal. In 1870, Lake Grove established its first post office, which carried the mail to and from Lakeland station (discontinued in 1883) by horse and wagon. The area was variously called Lakeland, Lakeville, New Village, Ronkonkoma or West Middle Island until it settled on the name Lake Grove in mid-19th century, after the groves of trees near Lake Ronkonkoma.

During the early 20th century Lake Ronkonkoma became a popular area for recreation, which prompted many small summer houses built on private roads of Lake Grove. In 1921, a new post office was erected in the eastern part of the area and given the name of Centereach. The next significant housing development built in Lake Grove was called Brook Lawn and was located on Stony Brook Road, which later grew into Stony Brook. More developments followed and the population of Lake Grove increased rapidly. In 1954, the newly built Nesconset Highway created a major commercial crossroad in Lake Grove, which prompted the construction of the Smith Haven Mall in 1968, which in turn made the local residents become concerned about the impact of new businesses and increased traffic in their community.

In order to gain local control of the zoning and planning, Lake Grove was incorporated by a vote of 552 to 332 on September 9, 1968.

== Geography ==
According to the United States Census Bureau, the village has a total area of 3.0 square miles (7.8 km^{2}), all land.

== Demographics ==
Historical population
Census	Pop.	Note	%±
1970	8,133		—
1980	9,692		19.2%
1990	9,612		−0.8%
2000	10,250		6.6%
2010	11,163		8.9%
2020	11,072		−0.8%
U.S. Decennial Census

=== 2020 census ===
As of the 2020 census, Lake Grove had a population of 11,072. The median age was 44.3 years. 18.1% of residents were under the age of 18 and 20.0% of residents were 65 years of age or older. For every 100 females there were 99.4 males, and for every 100 females age 18 and over there were 96.7 males age 18 and over.

100.0% of residents lived in urban areas, while 0.0% lived in rural areas.

There were 3,910 households in Lake Grove, of which 30.2% had children under the age of 18 living in them. Of all households, 57.7% were married-couple households, 14.1% were households with a male householder and no spouse or partner present, and 22.6% were households with a female householder and no spouse or partner present. About 20.7% of all households were made up of individuals and 10.5% had someone living alone who was 65 years of age or older.

There were 4,078 housing units, of which 4.1% were vacant. The homeowner vacancy rate was 0.9% and the rental vacancy rate was 7.3%.

Racial composition as of the 2020 census
Race	Number	Percent
White	8,626	77.9%
Black or African American	294	2.7%
American Indian and Alaska Native	19	0.2%
Asian	922	8.3%
Native Hawaiian and Other Pacific Islander	6	0.1%
Some other race	351	3.2%
Two or more races	854	7.7%
Hispanic or Latino (of any race)	1,252	11.3%

=== 2000 census ===
As of the 2000 census, there were 10,250 people, 3,419 households, and 2,742 families residing in the village. The population density was 3,436.8 inhabitants per square mile (1,327.0/km^{2}). There were 3,509 housing units at an average density of 1,176.6 per square mile (454.3/km^{2}). The racial makeup of the village was 91.31% White, 1.44% African American, 0.09% Native American, 4.93% Asian, 1.00% from other races, and 1.24% from two or more races. Hispanic or Latino of any race were 4.84% of the population.

There were 3,419 households, out of which 38.7% had children under the age of 18 living with them, 66.8% were married couples living together, 9.5% had a female householder with no husband present, and 19.8% were non-families. 14.4% of all households were made up of individuals, and 4.9% had someone living alone who was 65 years of age or older. The average household size was 2.98 and the average family size was 3.31.

In the village, the population was spread out, with 26.3% under the age of 18, 7.3% from 18 to 24, 34.7% from 25 to 44, 22.7% from 45 to 64, and 9.0% who were 65 years of age or older. The median age was 35 years. For every 100 females there were 98.1 males. For every 100 females age 18 and over, there were 94.3 males.

The median income for a household in the village was $67,174, and the median income for a family was $73,065. Males had a median income of $53,113 versus $33,253 for females. The per capita income for the village was $26,321. About 2.5% of families and 5.1% of the population were below the poverty threshold, including 6.8% of those under age 18 and 3.2% of those age 65 or over.

== Government ==
As of December 2021, the Mayor of Lake Grove is Robert J. Scottaline, the Deputy Mayor is Richard J. Cohen, and the Village Trustees are Richard J. Cohen, Richard Kick, John G. Peterson, and Felix Wienclaw.

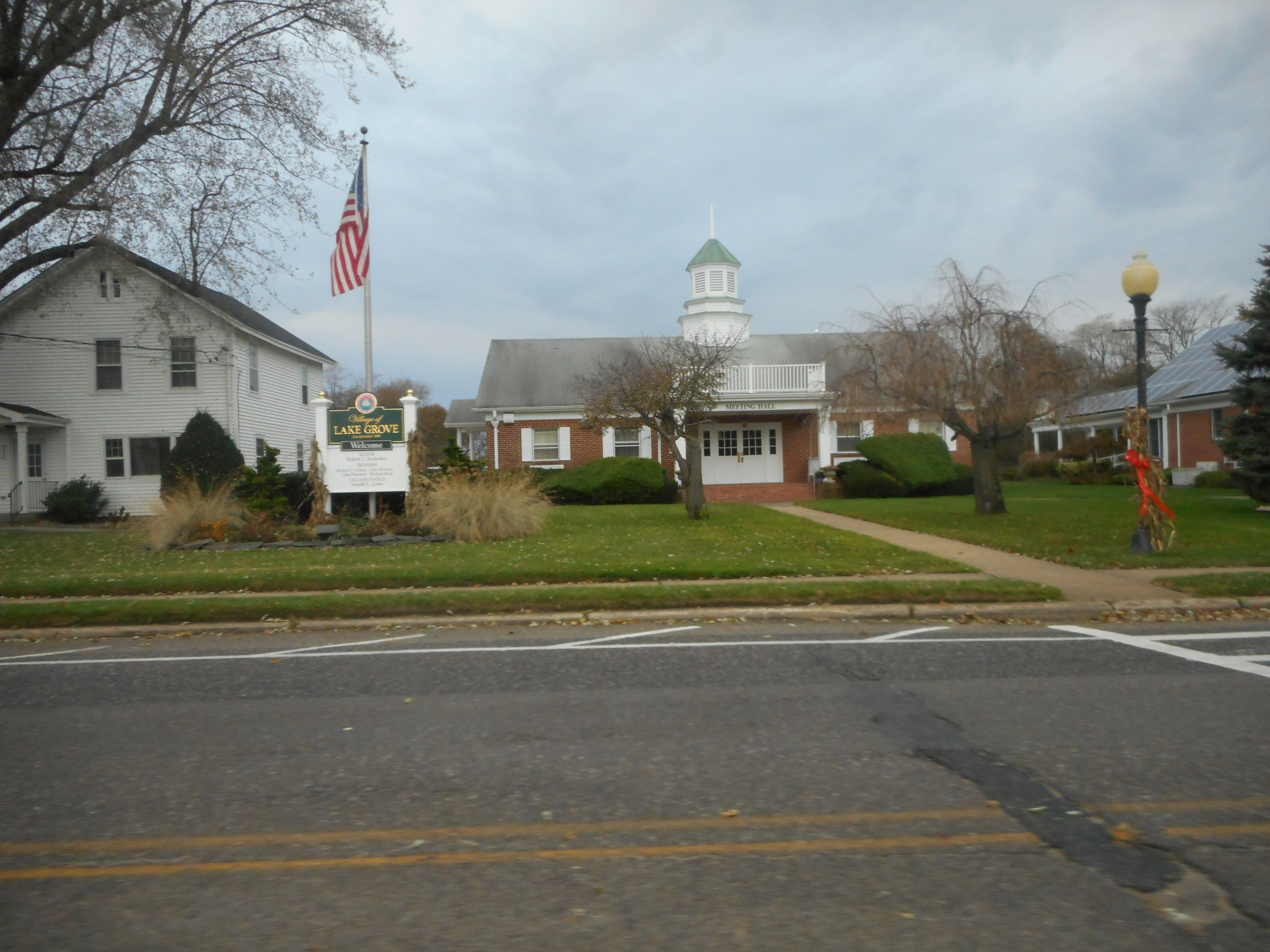
Lake Grove Village Hall in 2017.

Mayors of Lake Grove:
Mayor's name	Years in office
Alex Pisciotta	1968–1981
Lillian Griffin	1981–1995
Robert J. Henke	1995–2001
Scott D. Middleton	2001–2006
Robert J. Scottaline	2006 – present

== Education ==
Lake Grove is served by three school districts: the Sachem Central School District in the southern section, the Middle Country Central School District in the middle and northern sections, and the Three Village Central School District in the northeastern section.

== Economy ==
Lake Grove is home to roughly half of the Smith Haven Mall's property.

== Notable people ==
- Jon Bellion – Singer-songwriter, record producer, rapper.
- Arthur H. Howell (May 3, 1872 – July 10, 1940) – Chairman of the American Society of Mammalogists, teacher of Luther Goldman.
- Alycia Lane – Television journalist.
- Joseph Michael Scally (born December 31, 2002) – American professional soccer player who plays as a right back for Bundesliga club Borussia Mönchengladbach.
