= Huntington Station, New York =

Hamlet and census-designated place in Suffolk County, New York, United States

- Hamlet and census-designated place
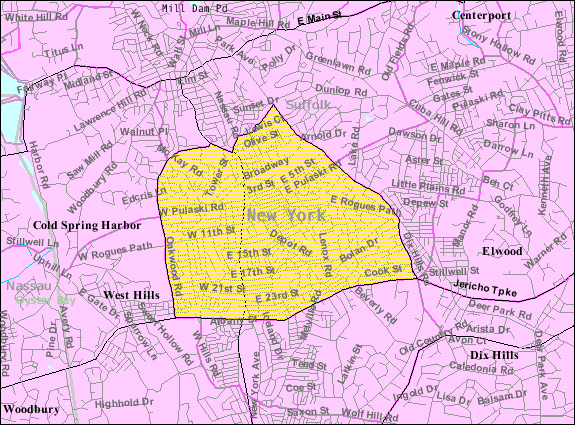
- U.S. Census map

- Location on Long Island Location within the state of New York
- Coordinates: 40°50′41″N 73°24′27″W
- Country: United States
- State: New York
- County: Suffolk
- Town: Huntington
- Named for: The Huntington Long Island Rail Road station

Area
  - Total: 5.48 sq mi (14.19 km^{2})
  - Land: 5.47 sq mi (14.18 km^{2})
  - Water: 0.0039 sq mi (0.01 km^{2})
- Elevation: 217 ft (66 m)

Population (2020)
  - Total: 34,878
  - Density: 6,369.8/sq mi (2,459.38/km^{2})
- Demonym(s): Huntingtonian; Huntington Stationite
- Time zone: UTC-5 (Eastern (EST))
  - Summer (DST): UTC-4 (EDT)
- ZIP codes: 11746, 11747, 11750
- Area codes: 631, 934
- FIPS code: 36-37044
- GNIS feature ID: 0953500

Huntington Station (historically known as Fairground) is a hamlet and census-designated place (CDP) located within the Town of Huntington in Suffolk County, on Long Island, in New York, United States. It is considered part of the Greater Huntington area, which is anchored by Huntington. The population was 34,878 at the time of the 2020 census.

== History ==
What is now Huntington Station was originally inhabited by Matinecock Native Americans. In the 17th century, European colonists – primarily English along with some Dutch – began to settle the area.

The hamlet was named for the local, eponymous railroad station, and was originally known as "Fairground."

Huntington Station was the birthplace of poet Walt Whitman. His home in the adjacent hamlet of South Huntington remains standing as a landmark, and is used as a museum.

== Economy ==
Across from the Walt Whitman Museum on Route 110 are the Walt Whitman Shops – a large shopping mall owned by Simon Property Group.

== Geography ==
According to the United States Census Bureau, the CDP has a total area of 14.2 square kilometres (5.5 sq mi), all land.

== Demographics ==
Historical population
| Census | Pop. | Note | %± |
|---|---|---|---|
| 2000 | 29,910 | | — |
| 2010 | 33,029 | | 10.4% |
| 2020 | 34,878 | | 5.6% |
U.S. Decennial Census

=== 2020 census ===
As of the 2020 census, Huntington Station had a population of 34,878, and the population density was 6,369.2 people per square mile. The median age was 36.8 years; 23.6% of residents were under the age of 18 and 12.8% were 65 years of age or older. For every 100 females there were 100.8 males, and for every 100 females age 18 and over there were 99.1 males age 18 and over.

There were 10,517 households in Huntington Station, of which 37.5% had children under the age of 18 living in them. Of all households, 49.9% were married-couple households, 16.4% were households with a male householder and no spouse or partner present, and 26.3% were households with a female householder and no spouse or partner present. About 20.3% of all households were made up of individuals and 8.7% had someone living alone who was 65 years of age or older.

There were 10,943 housing units, of which 3.9% were vacant. The homeowner vacancy rate was 1.1% and the rental vacancy rate was 2.8%.

100.0% of residents lived in urban areas, while 0.0% lived in rural areas.

Racial composition as of the 2020 census
| Race | Number | Percent |
|---|---|---|
| White | 15,035 | 43.1% |
| Black or African American | 3,210 | 9.2% |
| American Indian and Alaska Native | 317 | 0.9% |
| Asian | 1,610 | 4.6% |
| Native Hawaiian and Other Pacific Islander | 20 | 0.1% |
| Some other race | 9,221 | 26.4% |
| Two or more races | 5,465 | 15.7% |
| Hispanic or Latino (of any race) | 15,793 | 45.3% |

=== 2017–2021 American Community Survey ===
For the period 2017–2021, the median annual income for a household in the CDP was $104,871. The per capita income for the CDP was $43,565. About 11.7% of people were below the poverty line.

== Education ==
Huntington Station is located within the boundaries of (and is thus served by) the Harborfields Central School District, the Huntington Union Free School District, and the South Huntington Union Free School District. Accordingly, children who reside within the hamlet and attend public schools go to school in one of these three districts, depending on where they reside within the hamlet.

== Transportation ==
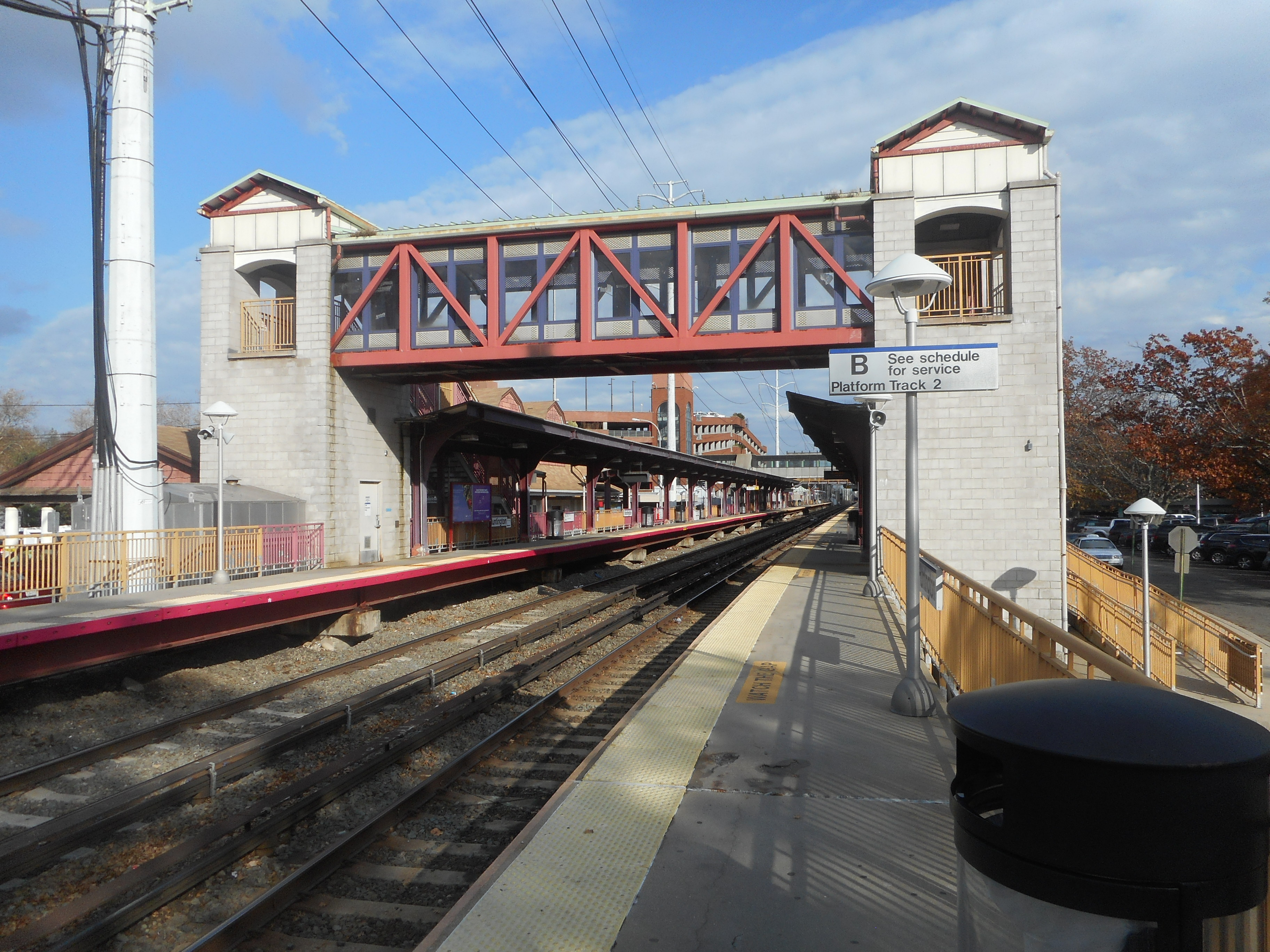
The Huntington LIRR station in 2017

The hamlet is a major transportation hub for the area. It is the beginning point of electrification for the Port Jefferson Branch of the Long Island Rail Road, and numerous New York City-bound trains originate and terminate at the Huntington LIRR station.

The hamlet also has the 1 bus (operated by Suffolk County Transit), providing service along New York State Route 110. In addition, the Town of Huntington also operates Huntington Area Rapid Transit (HART) buses through the area, with the H10 and H20 buses serving the area near the LIRR Huntington station, while the H30 and H40 buses only serve the southern portion of the hamlet by Jericho Turnpike.

== Notable people ==
- Dan Calichman – Soccer player and coach.
- Gerry Cooney – Former heavyweight boxer.
- Diabolic – Underground hip-hop artist and rapper.
- Adam Ferrara – Comedian.
- Tom Gugliotta – Former NBA forward with various teams
- Joseph Hazelwood – The ship's master of the Exxon Valdez at the time of the Exxon Valdez oil spill in the Prince William Sound, Alaska, on March 24, 1989.
- Charlie Korsmo – Lawyer; former child actor.
- Latterman – Punk rock band.
- A. J. Preller – General Manager of the San Diego Padres baseball team.
- Jim Wetherbee (born 1952) – Astronaut.
- Walt Whitman – Poet.

== See also ==
- Port Jefferson Station, New York
- South Huntington, New York
