= New York State Route 108 =

Highway on Long Island, New York

New York State Route 108
- Harbor Road
- Map of Suffolk County on Long Island with NY 108 highlighted in red

Route information
- Maintained by NYSDOT
- Length: 1.72 mi (2.77 km)
- Existed: c. 1932–present

Major junctions
- South end: CR 11 in Cold Spring Harbor
- North end: NY 25A in Cold Spring Harbor

Location
- Country: United States
- State: New York
- Counties: Suffolk

Highway system
- New York Highways; Interstate; US; State; Reference; Parkways
← NY 107	→ NY 109

New York State Route 108 (NY 108) is a 1.72-mile-long (2.77 km) north–south state highway located on the Suffolk County side of the Suffolk–Nassau county line on Long Island, New York, in the United States. It is a spur route connecting NY 25A in Cold Spring Harbor to the Cold Spring Harbor station on the Long Island Rail Road's Port Jefferson Branch via Harbor Road. Harbor Road terminates at an intersection with Woodbury Road, on the Nassau County line, which carries County Route 11 to the east and unsigned County Route 12 to the west. NY 108, assigned in the early 1930s, is the shortest state highway on Long Island.

== Route description ==
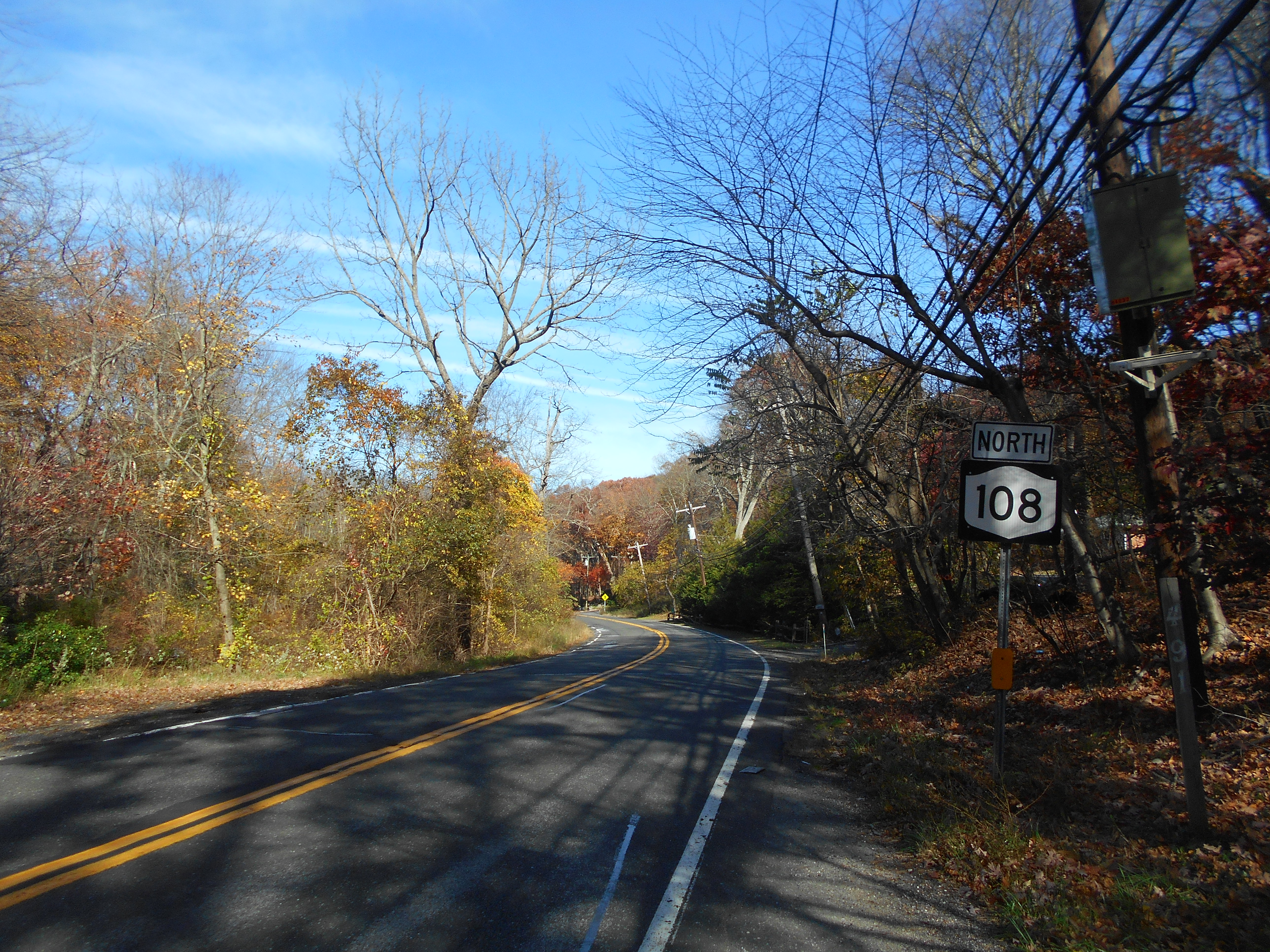
NY 108 northbound in Cold Spring Harbor

NY 108 begins at Woodbury Road at the Nassau County line in the community of Cold Spring Harbor. Woodbury Road continues east as CR 11, which later becomes Pulaski Road. To the west, Woodbury Road proceeds through Nassau County as unsigned CR 12. The road, named Harbor Road, passes to the north of the Long Island Rail Road's Cold Spring Harbor station and runs along the Nassau–Suffolk county line. The route heads northward through a small residential neighborhood. At the intersection with Stillwell Lane, NY 108 southbound crosses into Nassau County, but soon curves away back into Suffolk. Soon after, the two-lane road continues into Trail View State Park, where the route becomes desolate, passing two local ponds. A short distance later, NY 108 enters a small region of houses and intersects with Lawrence Hill Road. At the intersection with Lawrence Hill, NY 108 terminates; just westward lies an intersection with NY 25A (North Hempstead Turnpike) in Cold Spring Harbor. Southbound, however, NY 108 begins at the intersection with NY 25A.

== History ==
Harbor Road was improved to state highway standards as part of a project contracted out by the state of New York on September 4, 1919. A total of 5.86 miles (9.43 km) of highway were rebuilt as part of the $205,500 project (equivalent to $3.71 million in 2025), including the westernmost 4.5 miles (7.2 km) of modern NY 25A in Suffolk County. The roads reconstructed as part of the project were added to the state highway system on January 11, 1921, as unsigned State Highway 1525 (SH 1525). The east–west portion of SH 1525 was designated as part of NY 25 in the mid-1920s; however, the north–south leg did not receive a posted route number until c. 1932, when it became NY 108. The alignment of NY 108 has not been altered as of 1932.

== Major intersections ==
The entire route is in Cold Spring Harbor, Suffolk County.

mi	km	Destinations	Notes
0.00	0.00	CR 11 east (Woodbury Road)	Southern terminus; western terminus of CR 11
1.72	2.77	NY 25A – New York, Huntington	Northern terminus; access via Lawrence Hill Road
1.000 mi = 1.609 km; 1.000 km = 0.621 mi
