= County Route 11 (Suffolk County, New York) =

County road in Suffolk County, New York, US

County Route 11
- Map of Suffolk County on Long Island with CR 11 highlighted in red

Route information
- Maintained by SCDPW
- Length: 11.21 mi (18.04 km)
- Existed: January 27, 1930–present

Major junctions
- West end: NY 108 in Cold Spring Harbor
- NY 110 in Huntington Station; Sunken Meadow State Parkway in Kings Park
- East end: NY 25A in Kings Park

Location
- Country: United States
- State: New York
- County: Suffolk

Highway system
- County routes in New York; County Routes in Suffolk County
| ← CR 10 | → CR 12 |

County Route 11 (CR 11), mostly known as Pulaski Road, is a county road in northwestern Suffolk County, New York, in the United States. It runs west to east between New York State Route 108 in Cold Spring Harbor and New York State Route 25A in Kings Park. Most of the road is two lanes wide, although there are some areas where it opens up to four lanes, or simply allows center-left-turn lanes.

Within northwestern Suffolk County, CR 11 provides the closest access to the Port Jefferson Branch of the Long Island Rail Road, since it runs roughly parallel to the tracks throughout its span.

== Route description ==
CR 11 begins an intersection with NY 108 just east of the Nassau–Suffolk county line. In Nassau County, the road is Woodbury Road and designated (but unsigned) as CR 12. CR 11 interrupts Woodbury Road, rather than replacing it. Shortly after this intersection, Woodbury Road moves north towards Huntington, while Pulaski Road, part of New York State Bicycle Route 25A (NYS Bike Route 25A), treks eastward.

In Huntington Manor, CR 11 intersects with CR 92 where NYS Bike Route 25A turns south. It then crosses the Port Jefferson Branch of the Long Island Rail Road at an at-grade crossing before reaching the intersection of NY 110 in Huntington Station. Also in Huntington Station is the intersection of CR 35, which has become a connection between the North Shore and NY 231, since the cancellation of the proposed Babylon–Northport Expressway.

East of this point, much of the road is dotted with town houses and condominiums built along frontage roads. In Greenlawn, the road intersects with unsigned CR 9 (Cuba Hill Road), and signed CR 86 (Broadway–Greenlawn Centerport Road). Greenlawn Park, which has a local baseball field, is bordered by these three roads. In East Northport, the road winds left near Oswego Drive, where the formerly proposed Babylon–Northport Expressway was intended to have an interchange. From there, Pulaski Road intersects CR 10 (Elwood Road) and then after Larkfield Road.

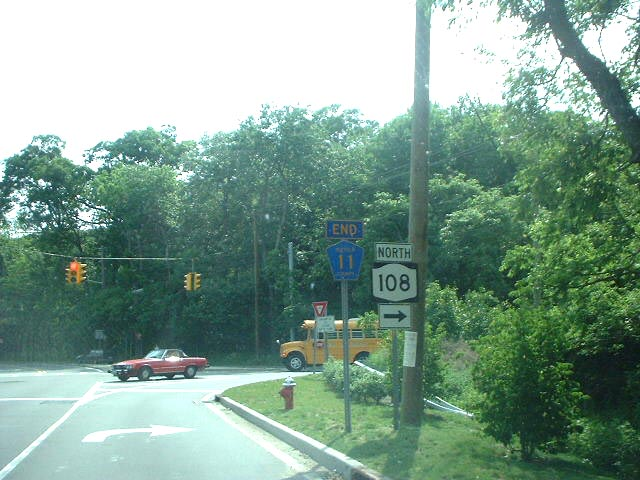
NY 108 at its southern terminus in Cold Spring Harbor facing westbound on CR 11

Crossing over the Port Jefferson Branch of the Long Island Rail Road a second time, Pulaski Road takes a steep drop down a hill far below the level of the tracks, where it encounters the intersection of Bread and Cheese Hollow Road. After, Pulaski Road leaves the Town of Huntington and enters the Town of Smithtown.

Sunken Meadow State Parkway was built underneath Pulaski Road in the 1950s. It shares a cloverleaf interchange, which has the southernmost ramps squeezed tightly between the train trestle carrying the LIRR Port Jefferson line. From there on, the name of the road is immediately changed to East Northport Road. NYS Bike Route 25A rejoins CR 11 at Old Commack Road, and CR 11 ends at NY 25A just two blocks west of Church Street. Northeast of CR 11's terminus at NY 25A, the road turns into Old Dock Road and runs along the west side of the former Kings Park State Hospital until reaching the Nissequogue River.

== History ==
CR 11 was assigned on January 27, 1930. Prior to 1961, Pulaski Road had suffixed sections of CR 11 that were intended to be integrated into the rest of the road, many of which were at disjointed intersections. Once the intersections were fixed, the suffixes were deleted.

- CR 11A: assigned to Pulaski Road between CR 86 and CR 10 from January 26, 1931 to September 21, 1966
- CR 11B: assigned to Pulaski Road between NY 110 and CR 86 from December 28, 1931 to September 21, 1966
- CR 11C: assigned to Pulaski Road between NY 108 and NY 110 from November 27, 1933 to September 21, 1966

From the 1940s through the 1960s, the New York State Department of Transportation considered acquiring the road as part of a proposed North Shore Expressway which was to include the realignment of NY 25A. It was thwarted by public opposition in the 1970s.

== Major intersections ==
The entire route is in Suffolk County.

| Location | mi | km | Destinations | Notes |
|---|---|---|---|---|
| Cold Spring Harbor | 0.00 | 0.00 | NY 108 north (Harbor Road) – Cold Spring Harbor, Woodbury | Western terminus; southern terminus of NY 108 |
| Huntington Station | 1.45 | 2.33 | CR 92 (Oakwood Road) – Huntington, West Hills | |
| Huntington Station | 2.48 | 3.99 | NY 110 (New York Avenue) – Huntington, Melville | |
| Huntington Station | 3.73 | 6.00 | CR 35 (Park Avenue) – Huntington, Dix Hills | |
| Greenlawn | 5.02 | 8.08 | Cuba Hill Road (CR 9) – Huntington, Elwood | |
| Greenlawn | 5.24 | 8.43 | CR 86 (Broadway) | |
| East Northport | 6.82 | 10.98 | CR 10 (Elwood Road) – Northport, Elwood | |
| Kings Park | 10.44 | 16.80 | Sunken Meadow State Parkway – Sunken Meadow State Park, South Shore | Exits SM4E-W on Sunken Meadow Parkway; cloverleaf interchange |
| Kings Park | 11.21 | 18.04 | NY 25A (Main Street) – Fort Salonga, Smithtown | Eastern terminus |
1.000 mi = 1.609 km; 1.000 km = 0.621 mi
