= Smith Haven Mall =

Shopping mall on Long Island, New York, U.S.

Coordinates: 40°51′53.98″N 73°07′48.45″W

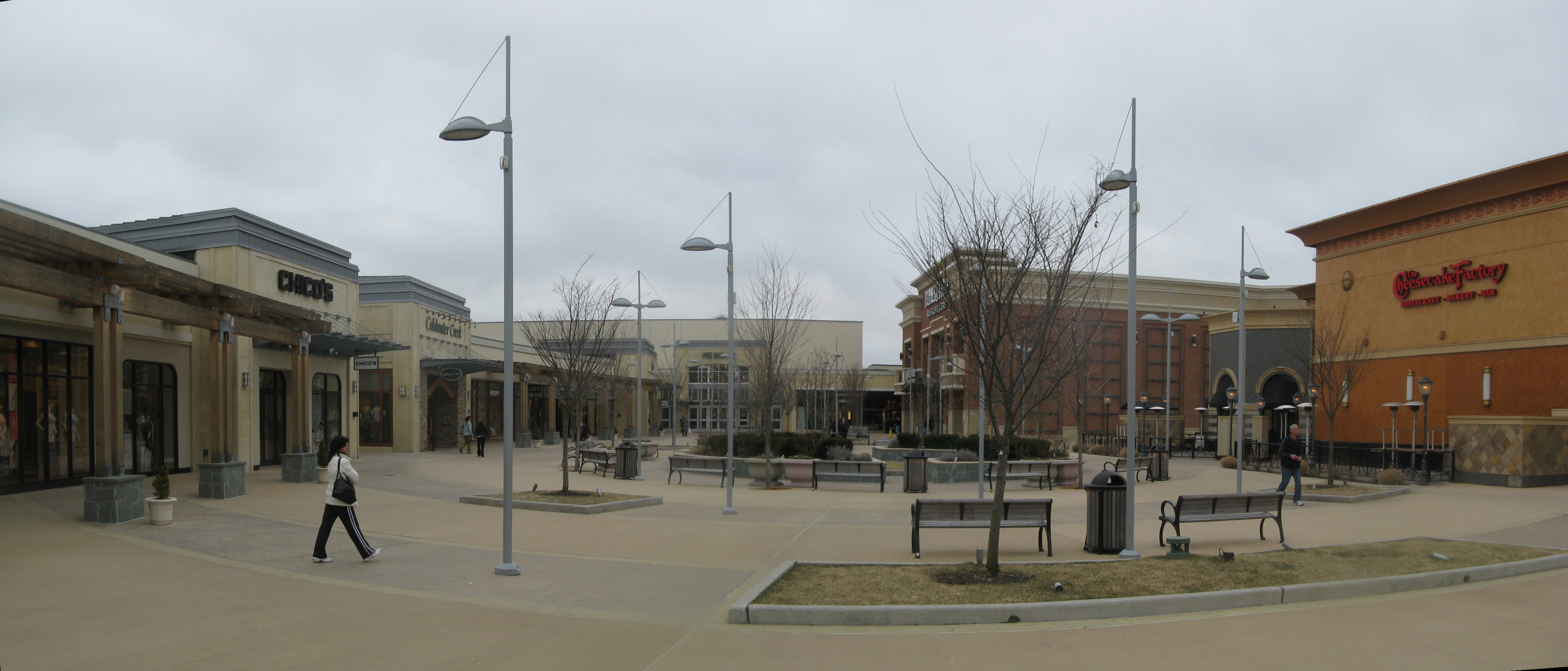
- Outdoor lifestyle center at Smith Haven Mall
- Location: Lake Grove, New York, United States
- Opened: March 12, 1969; 57 years ago
- Developer: R.H. Macy & Co.
- Manager: Simon Property Group
- Owner: Simon Property Group (25%)
- Architect: Copeland, Novak, & Israel
- Num. of stores: 119
- Num. of anchor tenants: 4
- Floor area: 1,204,769 square feet (111,927 m^{2})
- Floors: 1
- Parking: Lighted lot
- Public transit: Suffolk County Transit: 4, 5, 51, 58, 62
- Website: Smith Haven Mall

The Smith Haven Mall is a shopping mall located in Lake Grove and St. James, New York, United States. It is the main mall for the "Middle Island" area of Long Island. It is also the easternmost enclosed mall on Long Island, and thus draws shoppers from the communities that make up the Hamptons, and the North Fork. The mall features Macy's, Dick's Sporting Goods, and Primark. The space last occupied by Sears is now a doctor's office operated by Stony Brook Medicine.

The complex covers an area of 1,204,769-square-foot (111,927 m^{2}) of retail space, with the key building (opened in 1969) being one story and 800,000-square-foot (74,000 m^{2}), which includes 119 shops and restaurants. The mall has been managed since 1995 by Simon Property Group.

The mall's name is a portmanteau of the towns of Smithtown and Brookhaven, as the mall overlaps the boundaries of these towns. It additionally overlaps the boundaries of the Smithtown and Middle Country Central School Districts.

== History ==
Plans for the mall were first announced in October 1965 by Macy's, with the tentative name of Nesconset Shopping Center. By the time the mall was completed in 1969, the name had changed to Smith Haven Mall. Anchors Macy's and Abraham & Straus held a preview event on March 10, 1969, with guest of honor Robert Moses. The mall officially opened on March 12, 1969. Three more anchors soon opened: a 68,000-square-foot (6,300 m^{2}) Martin's (later Steinbach, JCPenney), and Sears. Century Theatres opened in May 1969.

The mall was notable for its public artworks. Developers, Leonard Holzer, was married to art dealer Jane Holzer, who had her husband set aside $350,000 in the mall's budget to commission sculptures and paintings by artists including Larry Rivers, Jim Dine, Robert Grosvenor, and Alexander Calder. The mall's art installations included one of the final works by Calder, a giant mobile Janey Waney which was made especially for the mall's opening, and a 40-foot (12 m) mural by Larry Rivers. Calder's piece was taken down in 1972, but was refurbished and moved to the newly built food court in 1987, which was named Calder Court for the sculptor. The food court was later renamed Saturn Court when the car dealership picked up the food court's sponsorship.

After Holzer sold his interest in the mall, the art work was dismantled. Rivers' mural, "40 Feet Of Fashion", was 40 feet (12 m) long and 20 feet (6 m) and consisted of an assemblage of giant Plexiglas objects including lips, a clock, bathing suits and giant women's legs. When the art work was dismantled, the legs were installed in front of Rivers' home, where they remained until being sold at auction in 2021. The Calder piece sold at auction for $1.7 million in 2002. It was eventually installed in Gramercy Park and has since been placed on display around Europe.

A&S closed in 1995 and was replaced by Stern's

Cineplex Odeon Corporation upgraded the existing movie theater to include four screens in 1989 and added another eight in 1998. However, the theater closed in May 2002. Smith Haven Mall underwent a massive multi million-dollar renovation between 2006 and 2007, in which the space once occupied by Stern's and the adjacent unused parking lots was redeveloped into an open-air "lifestyle center" format.

In July 2013, Uniqlo opened its first Long Island store at the mall.

JCPenney closed on July 15, 2019. Sears closed in 2020.

The mall closed on March 19, 2020, due to the COVID-19 pandemic, and remained closed until July.

In July 2023, Stony Brook Medicine opened a new outpatient center in the space previously occupied by Sears. In September 2023, Warby Parker opened. Primark opened in the former JCPenney in November 2023.

On February 10, 2025, a multi-million dollar renovation project was announced. This includes a new outdoor plaza, refurbished food court, and new stores.
