= Walt Whitman Birthplace State Historic Site =

- Walt Whitman House
- U.S. National Register of Historic Places
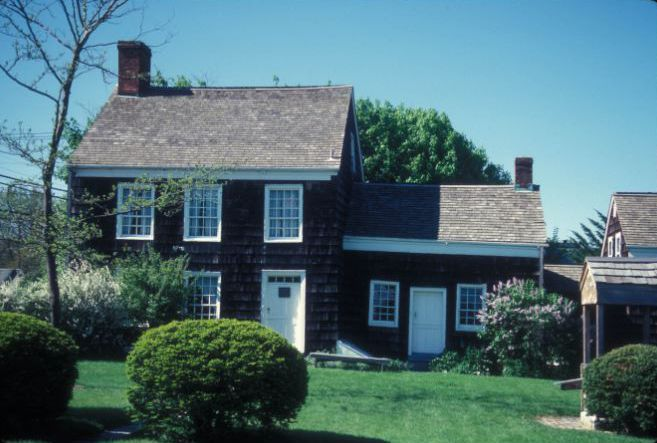

- Location within New York Location within the United States
- Interactive map showing the location of Walt Whitman House
- Location: 246 Walt Whitman Road, West Hills, New York
- Coordinates: 40°49′1.38″N 73°24′44.39″W
- Area: 1.3 acres (0.53 ha)
- Built: 1816
- Architect: Whitman, Walter
- MPS: Huntington Town MRA
- NRHP reference No.: 85002549
- Added to NRHP: September 26, 1985

The Walt Whitman Birthplace State Historic Site is a state historic site in West Hills, New York, listed on the National Register of Historic Places. The site preserves the birthplace of American poet Walt Whitman.

== History ==
The Whitman family's connection to Long Island dates back to the early 17th century and their property once covered 500 acres. Walter Whitman Sr., father of the poet, built this farmhouse in West Hills near Huntington, New York in 1816. Whitman Sr. was a Quaker and a carpenter and he built the two-story, cedar-shingled farmhouse by hand. The future poet was born here three years later in 1819. The Whitman family's other three children were born here as well. When Walt Jr. was five years old, the family moved to Brooklyn.

Whitman worked at various times as a printer, a schoolteacher, a journalist, a volunteer nurse during the Civil War, and a newspaper publisher. He returned to Long Island at age 17 to teach at a local school and founded the Long Islander newspaper. He eventually authored a book of poetry, Leaves of Grass, which sold poorly when first published but has over time come to be considered a masterpiece of world literature. The museum's web site says:

By the end of his life, Whitman had become the first American poet to achieve international acclaim. Today his poetry is available in every major language and inspires people world wide who find in Whitman the voice and vision of a truly international humanist.

Near the end of his life, he returned to the area and, as he reported, "rode around all the old familiar spots, viewing and pondering and dwelling long upon them, everything coming back to me from fifty years". Lilacs which grew on the property inspired Whitman's poem "When Lilacs Last in the Dooryard Bloom'd".

== Museum today ==
The Walt Whitman Birthplace State Historic Site & Interpretive Center is operated by the Walt Whitman Birthplace Association (WWBA), which was formed in 1949 to preserve the home. It was designated a New York State Historic Site in 1957 and in 1985 was added to both the New York State Register and National Register of Historic Places. It is run in collaboration with the New York State Office of Parks, Recreation and Historic Preservation. The site consists of three structures: The historic Birthplace which is maintained as the Museum, an interpretive center, and a gathering house used for exhibitions and meetings. The interpretive center includes displays of portraits, letters, and manuscripts and showcases Whitman's voice reading a few lines of his poem "America", originally recorded on an Edison wax cylinder.

The site offers guided tours, exhibits, an audio-visual show, events, a poet-in-residence program, and an annual poetry contest for local grade school students. The museum has nineteenth century furnishings, 130 Whitman portraits, original manuscripts and letters, artifacts, Whitman's voice on tape, and his schoolmaster's desk.

The museum is open every day June 15 through Labor Day except for major holidays. In the winter it is open Wednesday through Sunday. There is a museum gift shop. Tours for school classes and other large groups may be arranged in advance.

== See also ==
- List of New York State Historic Sites
- Walt Whitman House in Camden, New Jersey
- List of residences of American writers
