= Shinkuchan =

Shopping district of Kaohsiung, Taiwan

Coordinates: 22.62404°N 120.30194°E

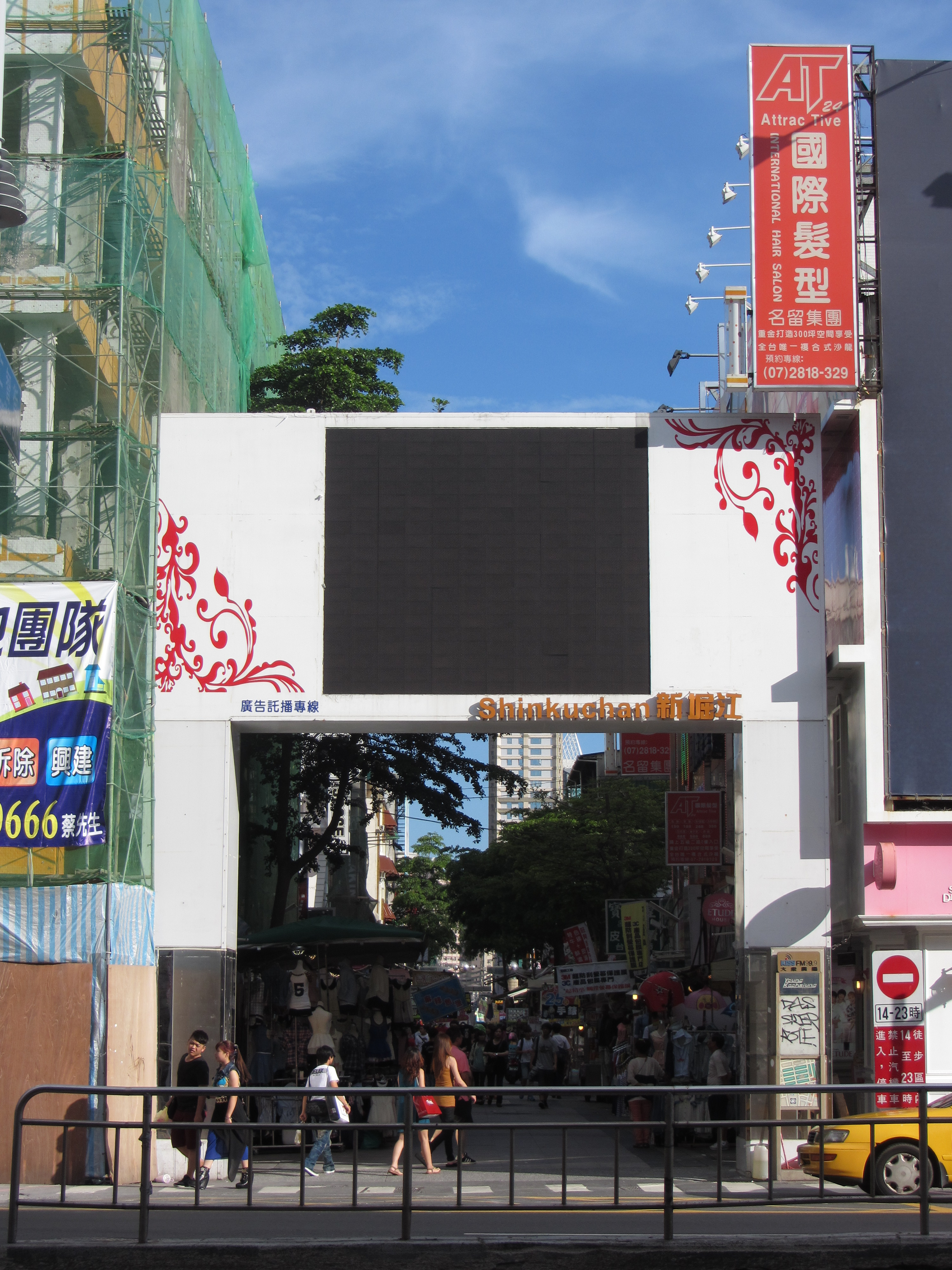
View of Wufu entrance of Shinkuchan.

Shinkuchan (Chinese: 新堀江; pinyin: Xīnkūjīang) is a car-free shopping, eating and entertainment district of Kaohsiung, Taiwan. Shinkuchan is a collection of several streets and alleys and is packed with boutique clothing shops and restaurants along with many stalls selling food, snacks, and drinks. Shinkuchan shops and stalls start to open mid-afternoon and the neighbourhood has many small alleys with small houses that have been turned into places to eat.

== History ==
The real birth of Shinkuchan was in the context of the collapse of the surrounding business district after a fire broke out in the Datong Department Store on October 29, 1995. In 1997, Liu Yifu, general manager of Shinkuchan, cooperated with the Ministry of Economic Affairs to comprehensively transform the district. Although this fire destroyed Datong Department Store, which had been operating for 20 years, it also gave the business district outside Datong Department Store an opportunity to reorganise.

== Overview ==
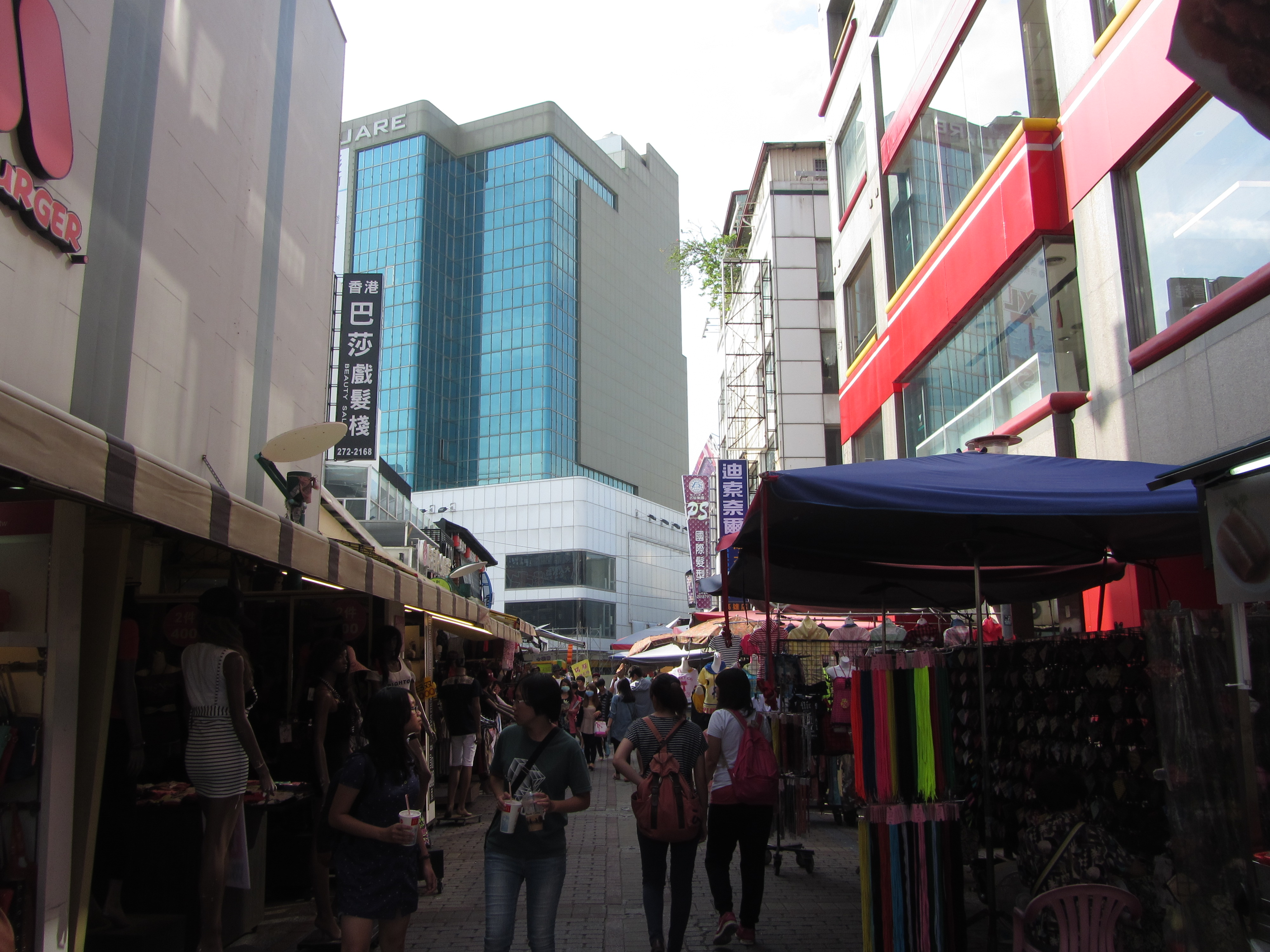
View of Shunkuchan.

Covering the area of Wufu 2nd Road and Renzhi Street of Kaohsiung City, Shinkuchan is renowned for its wide array of local and overseas fashionable clothing and accessories as well as special designer products. Similar to Ximending in Taipei, Shinkuchan is a popular Kaohsiung attraction involving youth and newfangled fashions, gourmet foods, and entertainment. Shinkuchan Commercial District has become the largest market in southern Taiwan for imported goods. Products from Paris, Milan, Hong Kong, and Tokyo can be found there, mostly oriented to teenagers. The district is close to many other tourist attractions, including 85 Sky Tower, Asia New Bay Area, Central Park, Liouhe Night Market.

== Transportation ==
Shinkuchan can be accessed by walk from Exit No.2 of the Kaohsiung Metro Central Park station.

== See also ==
- Sanduo Shopping District
- Ximending
