= Sanduo Shopping District =

Shopping district of Kaohsiung, Taiwan

Coordinates: 22.61426°N 120.30609°E

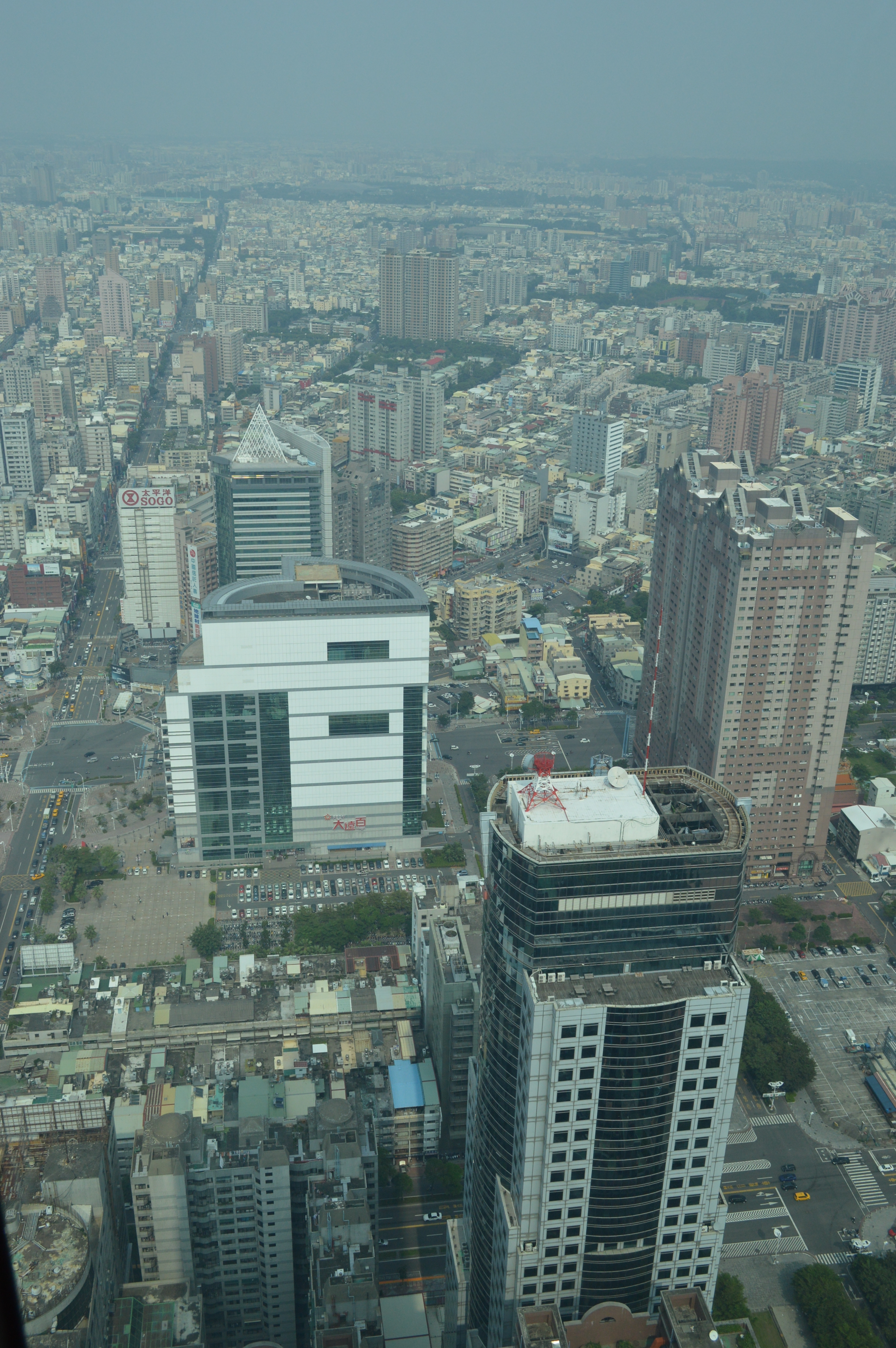
View of Sanduo Shopping District from 85 Sky Tower.

Sanduo Shopping District (Chinese: 三多商圈; pinyin: Sāndūo Shāngqūan is an affluent shopping, eating and entertainment district of Kaohsiung. Sanduo Shopping District began to rise in the late 1990s after Shin Kong Mitsukoshi Department Store and Pacific Sogo Department Store (today's Far East SOGO Department Store) opened branches in the area. Thus, it is often known as the "Manhattan of Kaohsiung".

== Overview ==
The district is in close proximity to many other tourist attractions, including 85 Sky Tower, Asia New Bay Area, Central Park, Liouhe Night Market.

== Transportation ==
Sanduo Shopping District can be accessed by walk from the Kaohsiung Metro to Sanduo Shopping District Station.

== See also ==
- Shinkuchan
- Ximending
