= Pedestrian zone =

Urban car-free area reserved for pedestrian use

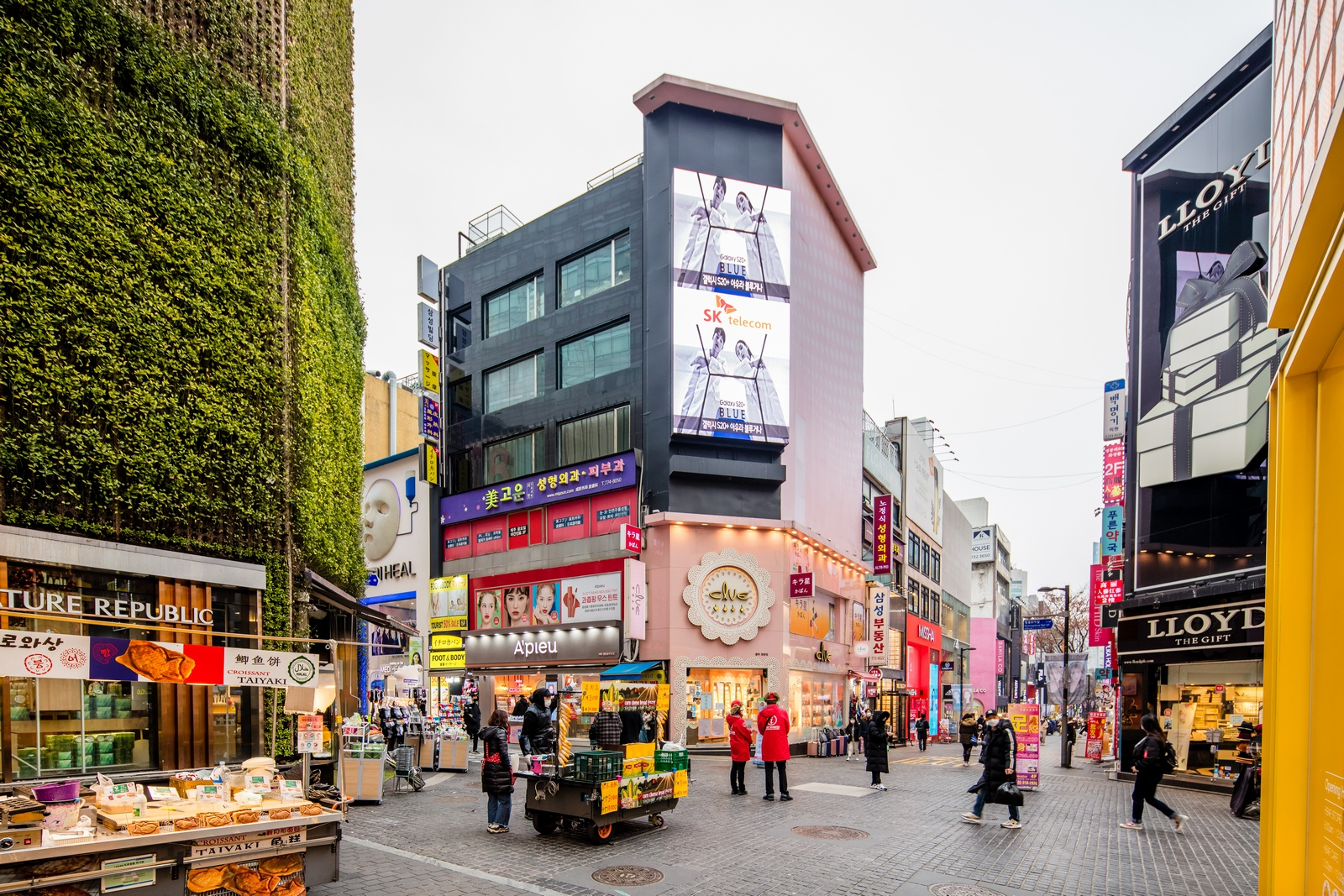
Pedestrian zone in Myeong-dong, Seoul

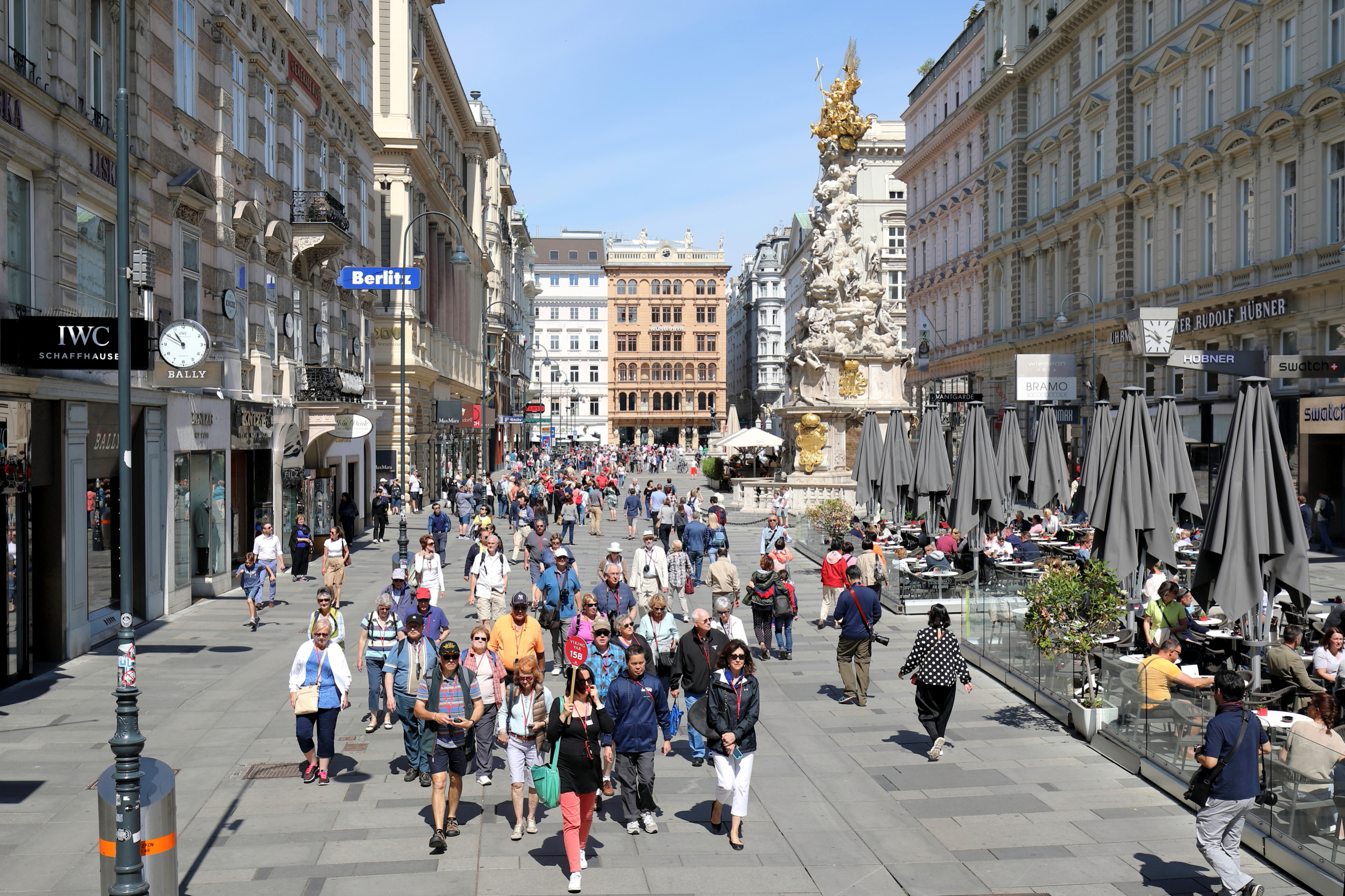
Vienna's first pedestrian zone on the Graben (2018)

Sign

Pedestrian zones (also known as auto-free zones and car-free zones, as pedestrian precincts in British English, street malls in Canada, and as pedestrian malls in the United States and Australia) are areas of a city or town restricted to use by people on foot or human-powered transport such as bicycles, with non-emergency motor traffic not allowed. Converting a street or an area to pedestrian-only use is called pedestrianization.

Pedestrianization usually aims to provide better accessibility and mobility for pedestrians, to enhance the amount of shopping and other business activities in the area or to improve the attractiveness of the local environment in terms of aesthetics, air pollution, noise and crashes involving motor vehicles with pedestrians. In some cases, motor traffic in surrounding areas increases, as it is displaced rather than replaced. Nonetheless, pedestrianisation schemes are often associated with significant falls in local air and noise pollution, better pedestrian safety, and frequently with increased retail turnover and increased property values locally.

A car-free development generally implies a large-scale pedestrianized area that relies on modes of transport other than the car, while pedestrian zones may vary in size from a single square to entire districts, but with highly variable degrees of dependence on cars for their broader transport links.

Pedestrian zones have a great variety of approaches to human-powered vehicles such as bicycles, inline skates, skateboards and kick scooters. Some have a total ban on anything with wheels, others ban certain categories, others segregate the human-powered wheels from foot traffic, and others still have no rules at all. Many Middle Eastern kasbahs have no motorized traffic, but use donkey- or hand-carts to carry goods.

== History ==
=== Origins in arcades ===
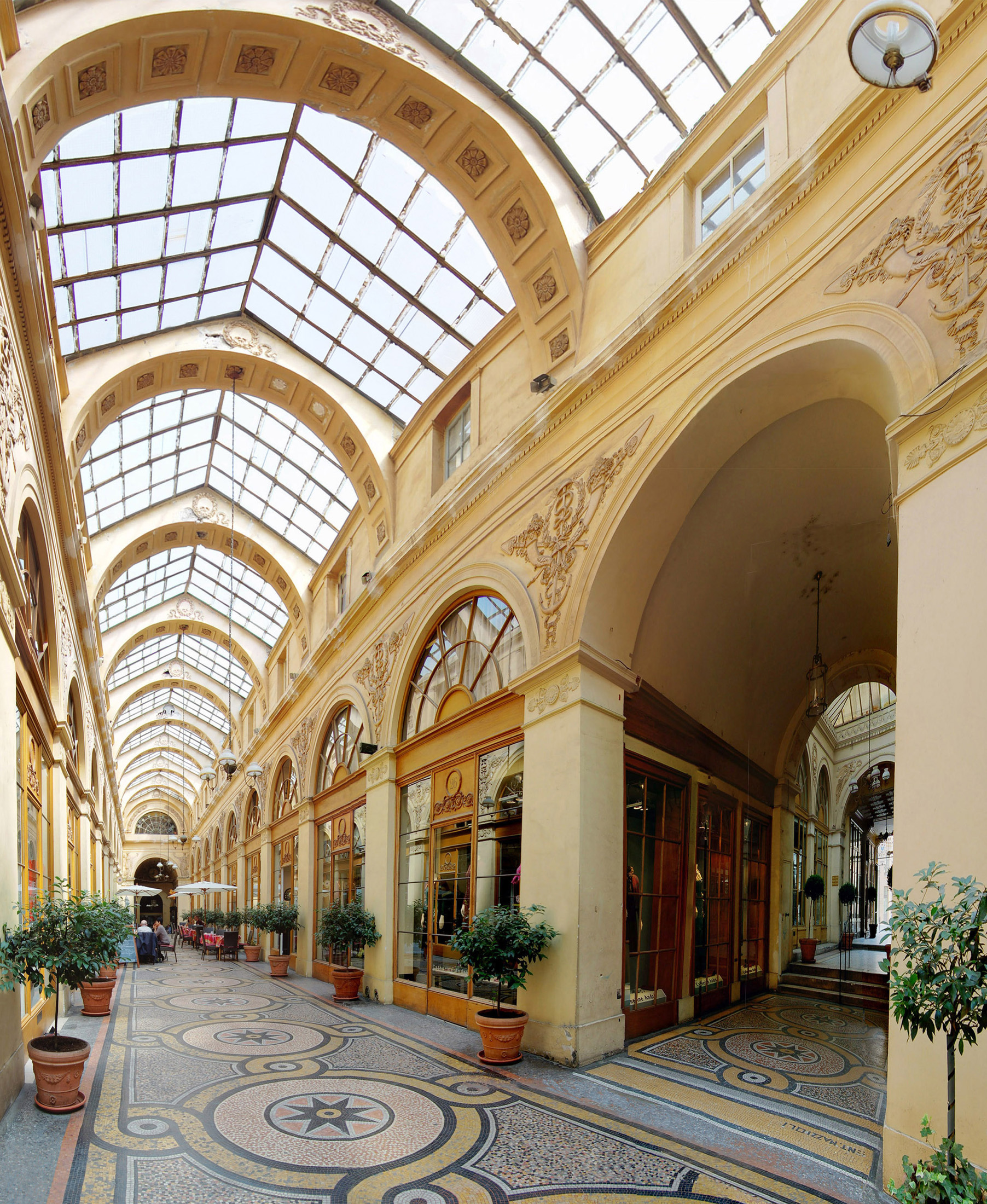
The Galerie Vivienne in Paris

The idea of separating pedestrians from wheeled traffic is an old one, dating back at least to the Renaissance. However, the earliest modern implementation of the idea in cities seems to date from about 1800, when the first covered shopping arcade was opened in Paris. Separated shopping arcades were constructed throughout Europe in the 19th century, precursors of modern shopping malls. A number of architects and city planners, including Joseph Paxton, Ebenezer Howard, and Clarence Stein, in the 19th and early 20th centuries proposed plans to separate pedestrians from traffic in various new developments.

=== 1920s–1970s ===
The first "pedestrianisation" of an existing street seems to have taken place "around 1929" in Essen, Germany. This was in Limbecker Straße, a very narrow shopping street that could not accommodate both vehicular and pedestrian traffic. Two other German cities followed this model in the early 1930s, but the idea was not seen outside Germany. Following the devastation of the Second World War a number of European cities implemented plans to pedestrianise city streets, although usually on a largely ad hoc basis, through the early 1950s, with little landscaping or planning. By 1955 twenty-one German cities had closed at least one street to automobile traffic, although only four were "true" pedestrian streets, designed for the purpose. At this time pedestrianisation was not seen as a traffic restraint policy, but rather as a complement to customers who would arrive by car in a city centre.

Pedestrianisation was also common in the United States during the 1950s and 60s as downtown businesses attempted to compete with new suburban shopping malls. However, most of these initiatives were not successful in the long term, and about 90% have been changed back to motorised areas.

=== 1980s–2010s ===
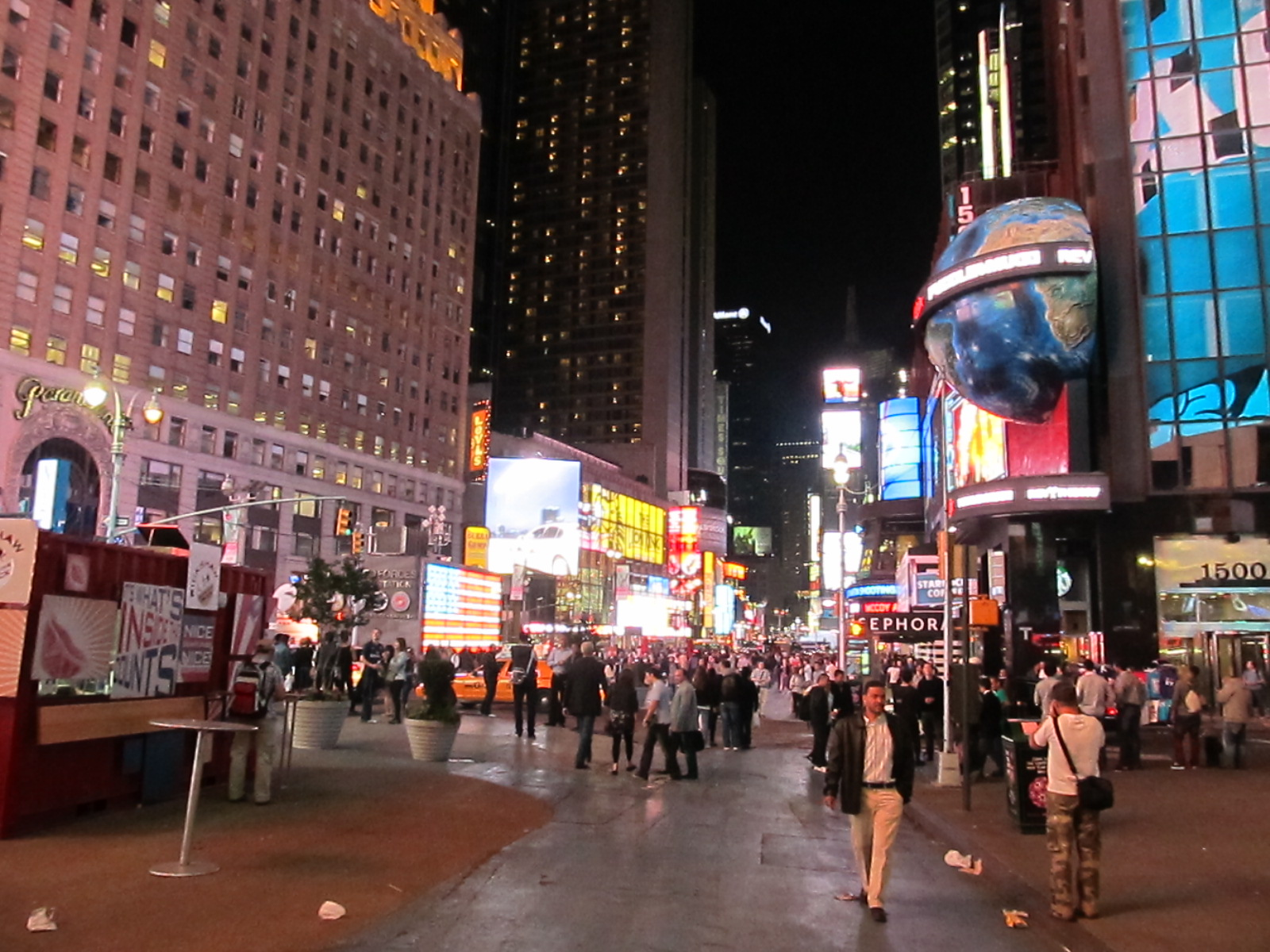
Pedestrianized area in Times Square, New York City

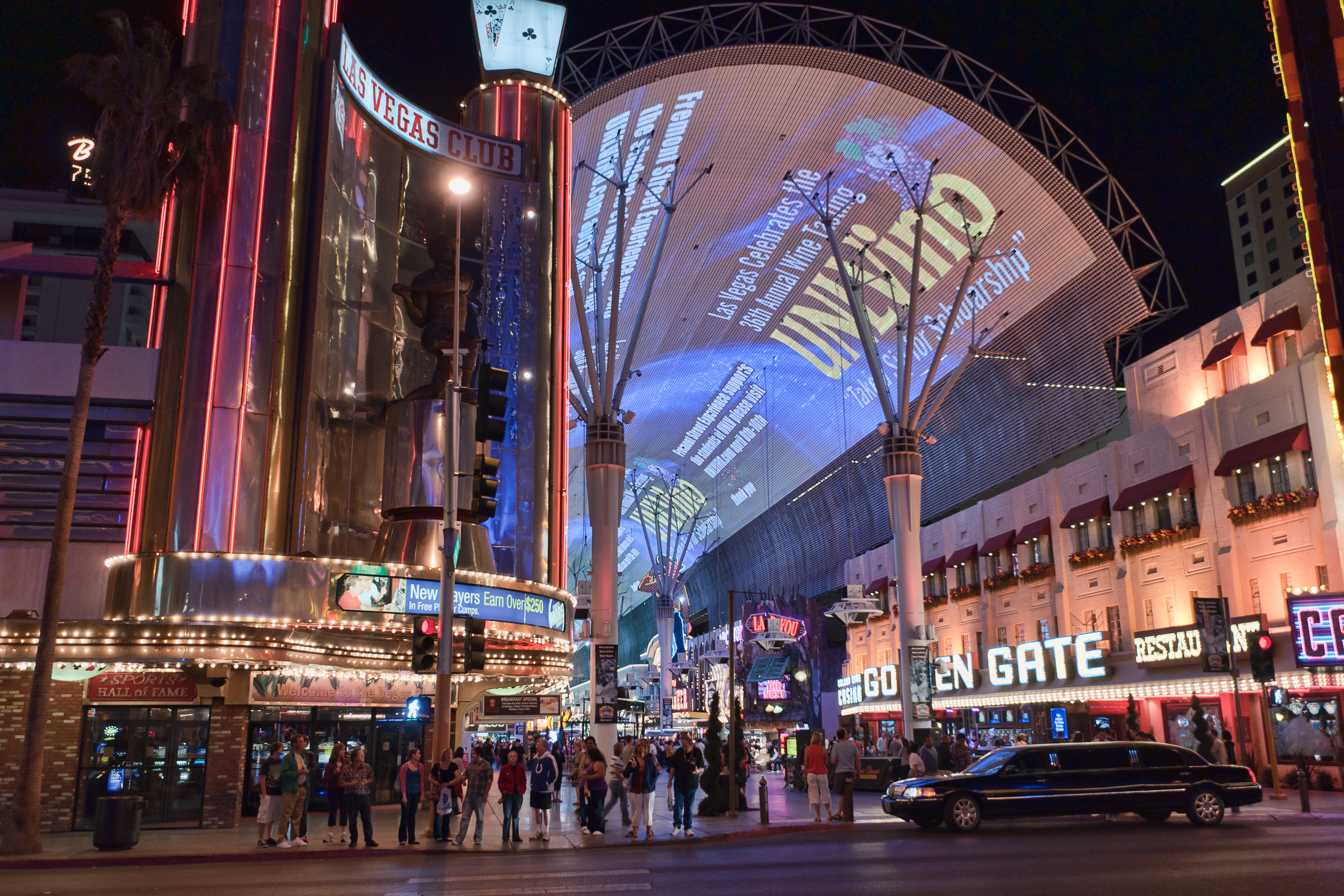
Fremont Street Experience in Las Vegas with the neon lights on

In Germany there were around 3.000 pedestrian zones established in 170 cities by 2010. They are a common feature in German cities in general. In the United States, several pedestrian zones in major tourist areas were successful, such as the renovation of the mall in Santa Monica on Los Angeles' Westside and its relaunch as the Third Street Promenade; the creation of the covered, pedestrian Fremont Street Experience in Downtown Las Vegas; the revival of East 4th Street in Downtown Cleveland; and the new pedestrian zone created in the mid-2010s in New York City including along Broadway (the street) and around Times Square.

=== COVID-19 pandemic ===
During the COVID-19 pandemic in 2020, some cities pedestrianised more streets to encourage social distancing, and in many cases to provide more space for restaurants to serve food on extended patios. In the United States, New York City closed up to 100 miles (160 km) of streets to cars across the city. In Madrid, Spain, the city pedestrianized 19 kilometres (12 miles) of streets and 235,000 square metres (58 acres) of spaces in total. The COVID-19 pandemic also prompted proposals for radical change in the organisation of the city, in particular in Barcelona, such as the pedestrianisation of the whole city and an inversion of the concept of "sidewalk"; these were two elements of the Manifesto for the Reorganisation of the city, written by architecture and urban theorist Massimo Paolini and signed by 160 academics and 300 architects.

== Definitions and types ==
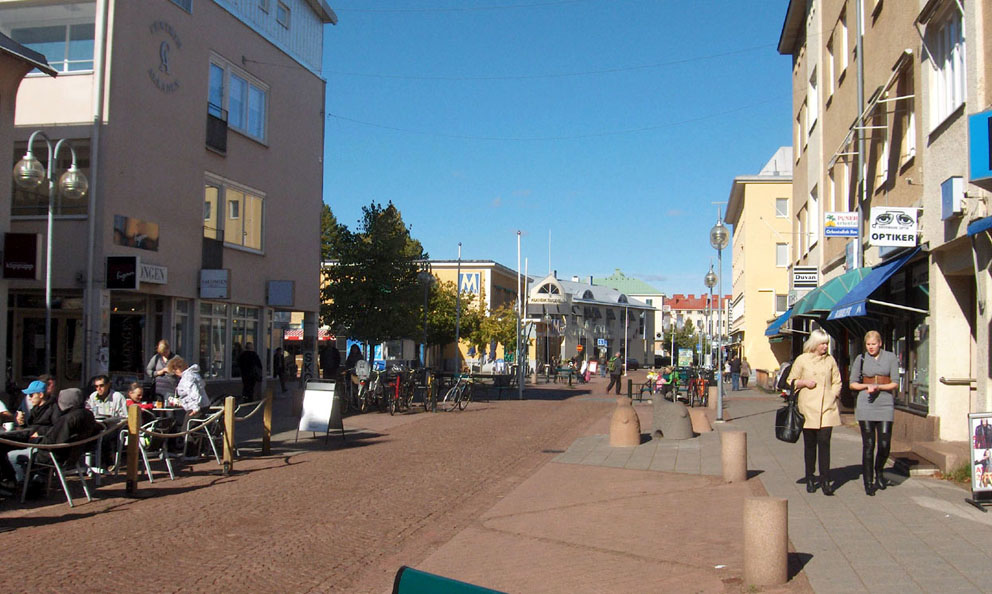
Torggatan, a pedestrian street in Mariehamn, Åland

A pedestrian zone is often limited in scope: for example, a single square or a few streets reserved for pedestrians, within a city where residents still largely get around in cars. A car-free town, city or region may be much larger.

=== Car free towns, cities and regions ===
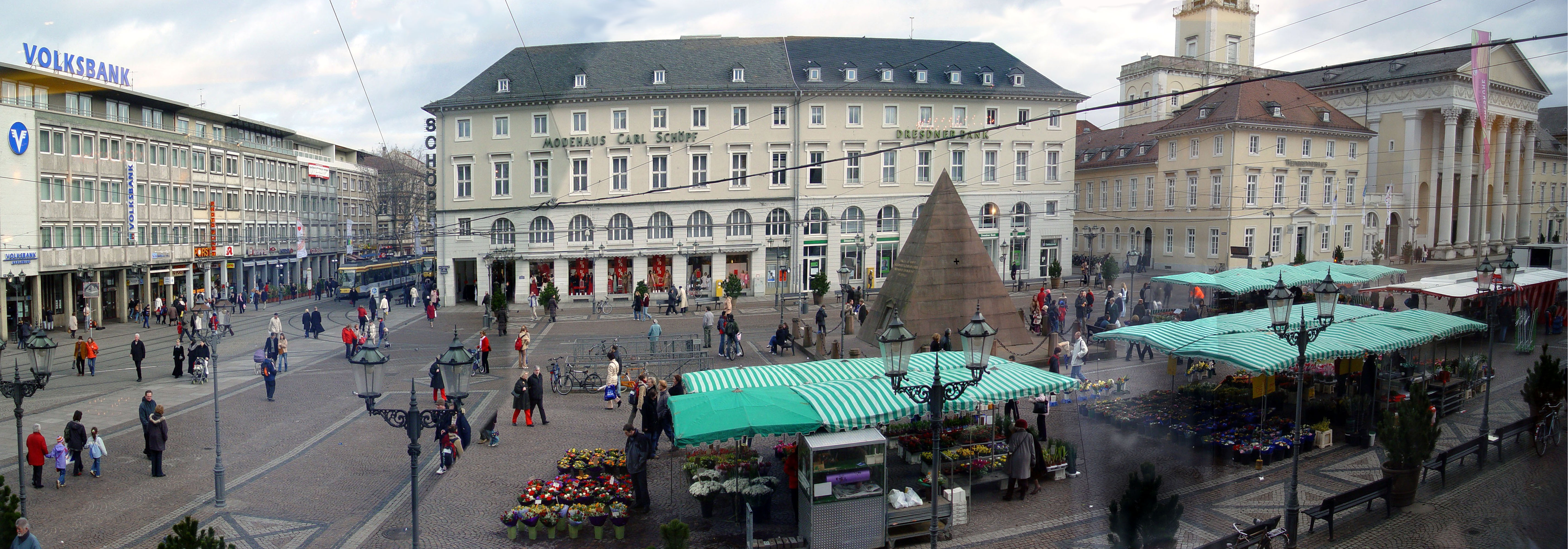
Marktplatz in Karlsruhe, Germany, coexisted with a tramline until 2013.

A car-free zone is different from a typical pedestrian zone, in that it implies a development largely predicated on modes of transport other than the car.

==== Examples ====
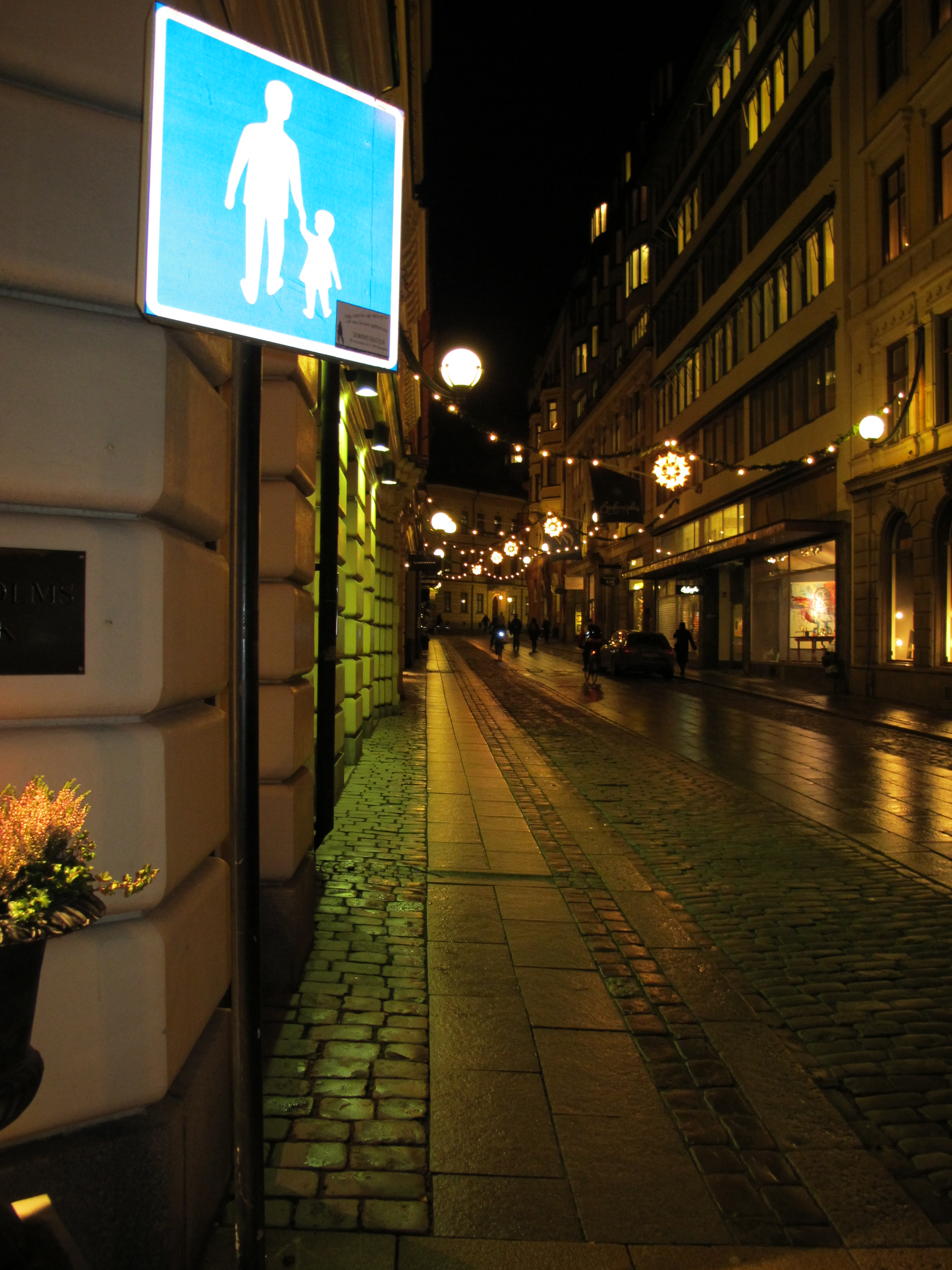
Sign for pedestrian street in Central Stockholm showing a father and daughter

A number of towns and cities in Europe have never allowed motor vehicles. Archetypal examples are:

- Venice, which occupies many islands in a lagoon, divided by and accessed from canals. Motor traffic stops at the car park at the head of the viaduct from the mainland, and water transport and walking take over from there. However, motor vehicles are allowed on the nearby Lido.
- Zermatt in the Swiss Alps. Most visitors reach Zermatt by a cog railway, and there are pedestrian-only streets, but there are also roads with motor vehicles.

Other examples are:

- Cinque Terre in Italy
- Ghent in Belgium: the pedestrian zone was extended in 2017 from 35 to more than 50 hectares (123 acres), one of the largest car-free areas in Europe.
- Pontevedra in Spain, an international model of pedestrianization, almost 50% of the city is pedestrianised.;
- The Old Town of Rhodes, where many, if not most, of the streets are too steep and/or narrow for car traffic.
- Mount Athos, an autonomous monastic state under the sovereignty of Greece, does not permit automobiles on its territory. Trucks and work-related vehicles only are in use there.
- The medieval city of Mdina in Malta does not allow automobiles past the city walls. It is known as the "Silent City" because of the absence of motor traffic in the city.
- Sark, an island in the English Channel, is a car-free zone where only bicycles, carriages and tractors are used as transportation.
- Gulangyu, an island off the coast of Xiamen in southeastern China. The only vehicles permitted are small electric buggies and electric government service vehicles.

To assist with transport from the car parks in at the edge of car-free cities, there are often bus stations, bicycle sharing stations, and the like.

==== Car-free development ====
The term car-free development implies a physical change: either built-up or changes to an existing built area.

In a 2010 publication co-authored by Steve Melia, car-free developments are defined as residential or mixed-use areas that typically provide an immediate environment devoid of vehicular traffic, offer little to no parking separated from the residence, and are designed to let residents live without car ownership. This definition, which they distinguish from the more common "low car development", is based mainly on experience in North West Europe, where the movement for car-free development began. Within this definition, three types are identified: the Vauban model (based on Vauban, Freiburg: it is not "carfree", but "parking-space-free" (German: stellplatzfrei) in some streets), the limited access model, and pedestrianised centres with residential populations.

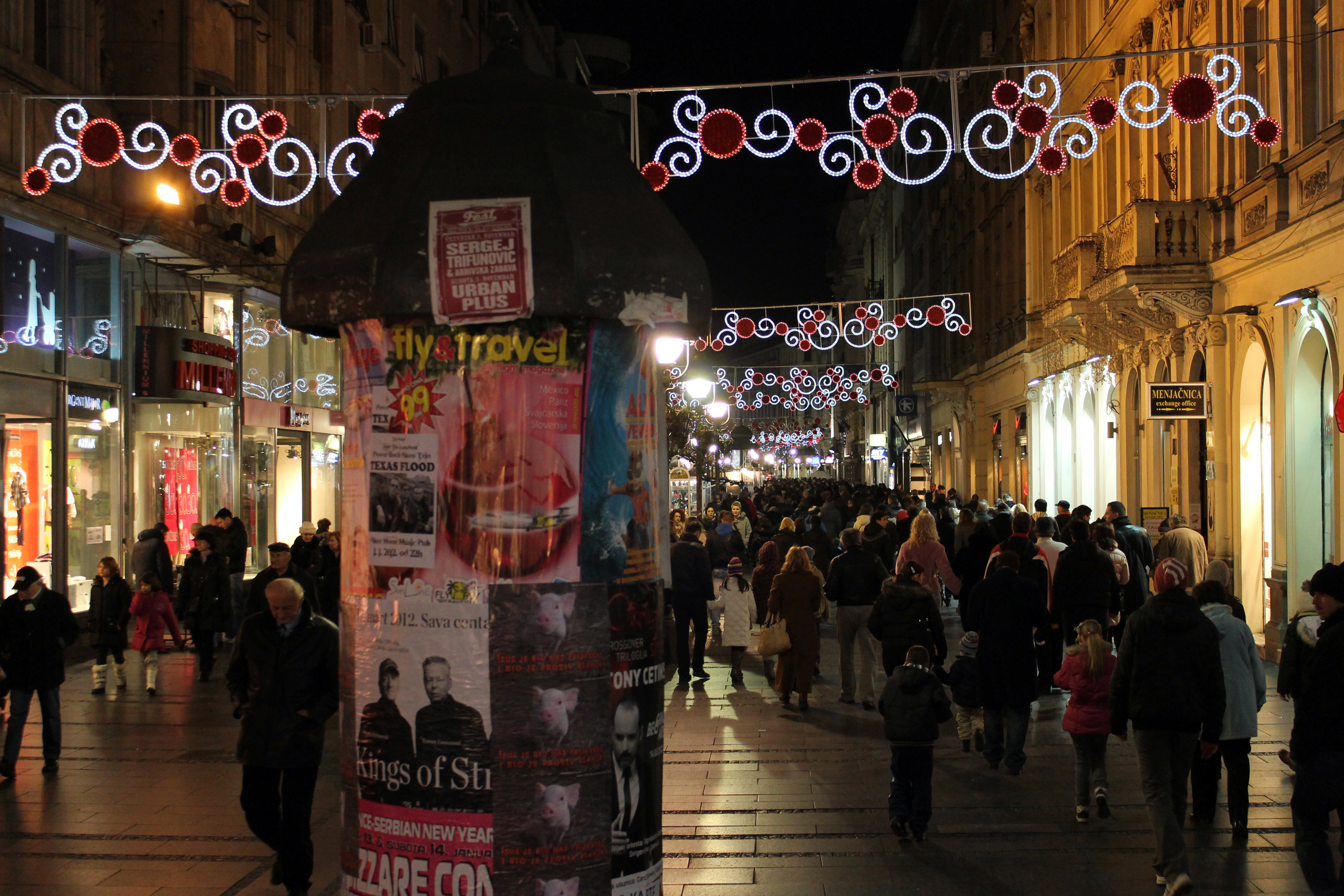
Knez Mihailova pedestrian zone at night with New Year decoration in Belgrade, Serbia

=== Limited access type ===
The more common form of carfree development involves some sort of physical barrier, which prevents motor vehicles from penetrating into a car-free interior. Melia et al. describe this as the "limited access" type. In some cases, such as Stellwerk 60 in Cologne, there is a removable barrier, controlled by a residents' organisation. In Amsterdam, Waterwijk is a 6-hectare (15-acre) neighborhood where cars may only access parking areas from the streets that form the edges of the neighborhood; all of the inner areas of the neighborhood are car-free.

=== Temporary car-free streets ===
Many cities close certain streets to automobiles, typically on weekends and especially in warm weather, to provide more urban space for recreation, and to increase foot traffic to nearby businesses. Examples include Newbury Street in Boston, and Memorial Drive in Cambridge, Massachusetts (which is along a river). In some cases, popularity has resulted in streets being permanently closed to cars, including JFK Drive in Golden Gate Park, San Francisco; Griffith Drive in Griffith Park, Los Angeles; and Capel Street in Dublin.

== Reception ==
Introduction to pedestrian, car-free and autoluw (low-traffic) zones: history, examples, pros and cons

=== Benefits ===
Several studies have been carried out on European carfree developments. The most comprehensive was conducted in 2000 by Jan Scheurer. Other more recent studies have been made of specific car-free areas such as Vienna's Floridsdorf car-free development.

Car-free developments see very low levels of car use and thus much less traffic on surrounding roads, high rates of walking and cycling, more independent movement and active play for children, and less land used for parking and roads, leaving more available for green or social space. The main benefits found for these developments are low atmospheric emissions, low road accident rates, better-built environmental conditions, and the encouragement of active modes.

=== Problems and criticism ===
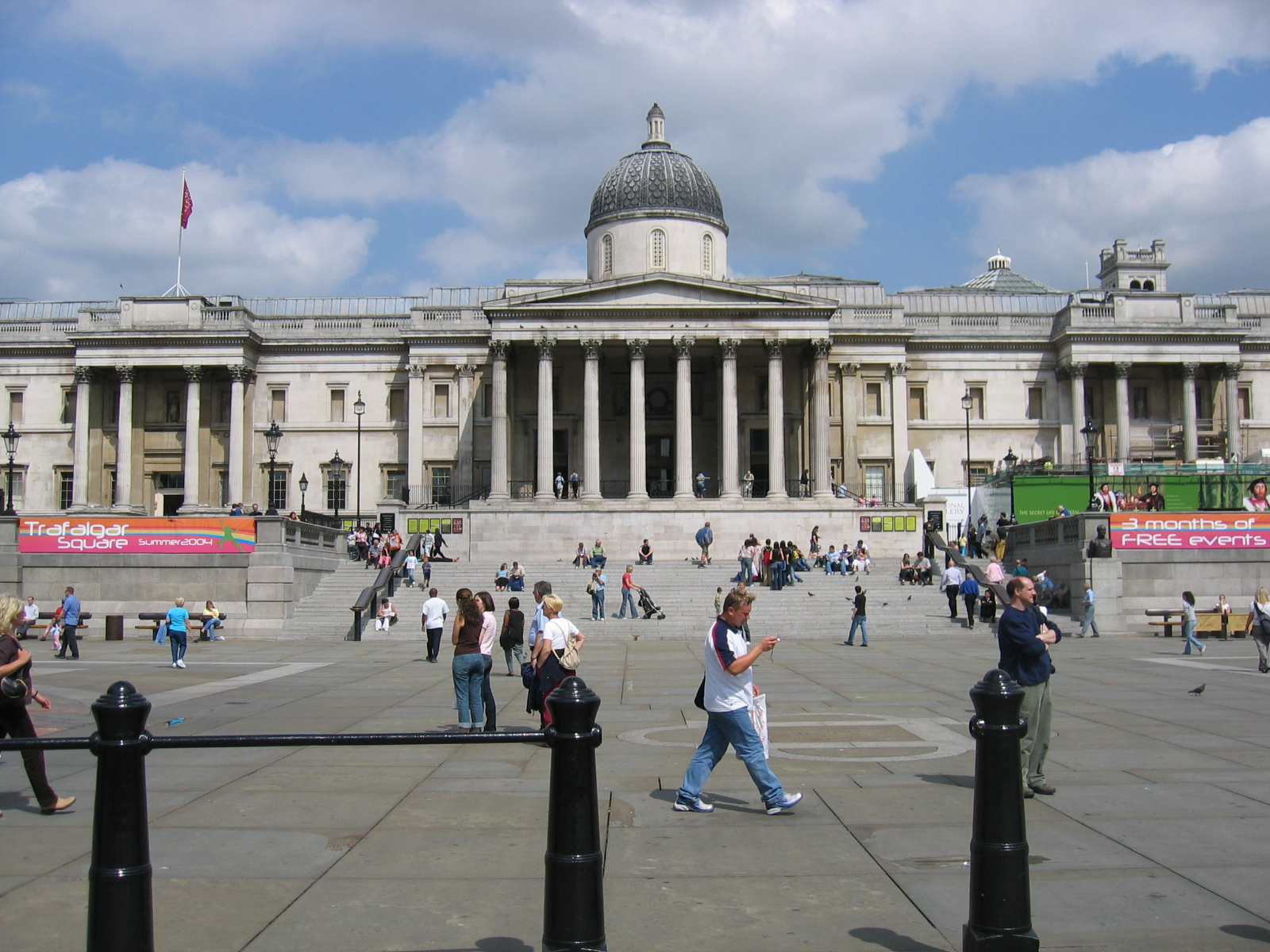
The National Gallery, Trafalgar Square, London

The main problems are related to parking management. Where parking is not controlled in the surrounding area, this often results in complaints from neighbours about overspill parking.

There were calls for traffic to be reinstated in Trafalgar Square, London, after pedestrianization caused noise nuisance for visitors to the National Gallery. The director of the gallery is reported to have blamed pedestrianization for the "trashing of a civic space".

Local shopkeepers may be critical of the effect of pedestrianization on their businesses. Reduced through traffic can lead to fewer customers using local businesses, depending on the environment and the area's dependence on the through traffic.

== By region and country ==
=== Europe ===
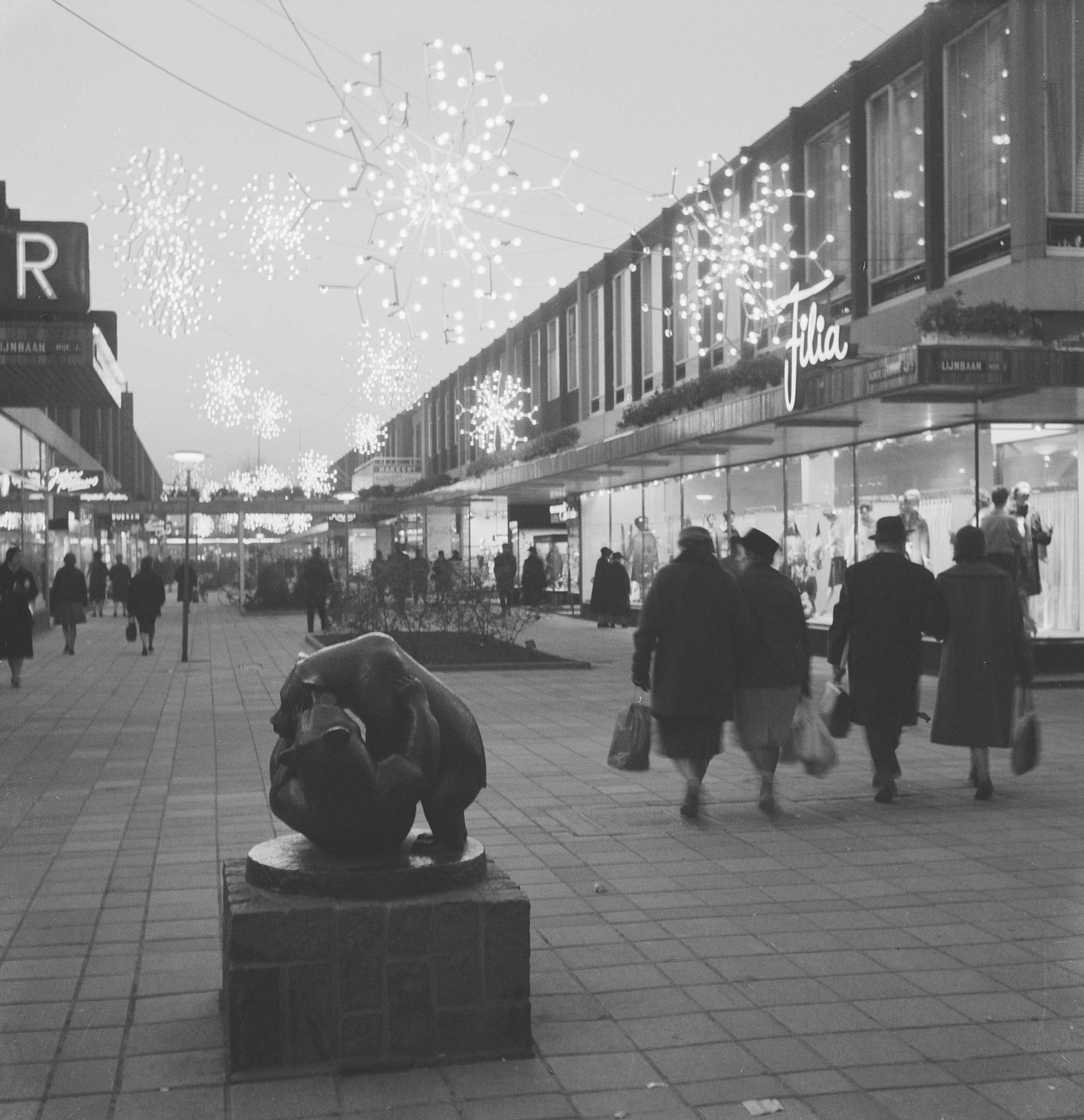
Lijnbaan, Rotterdam's main shopping street, 1961

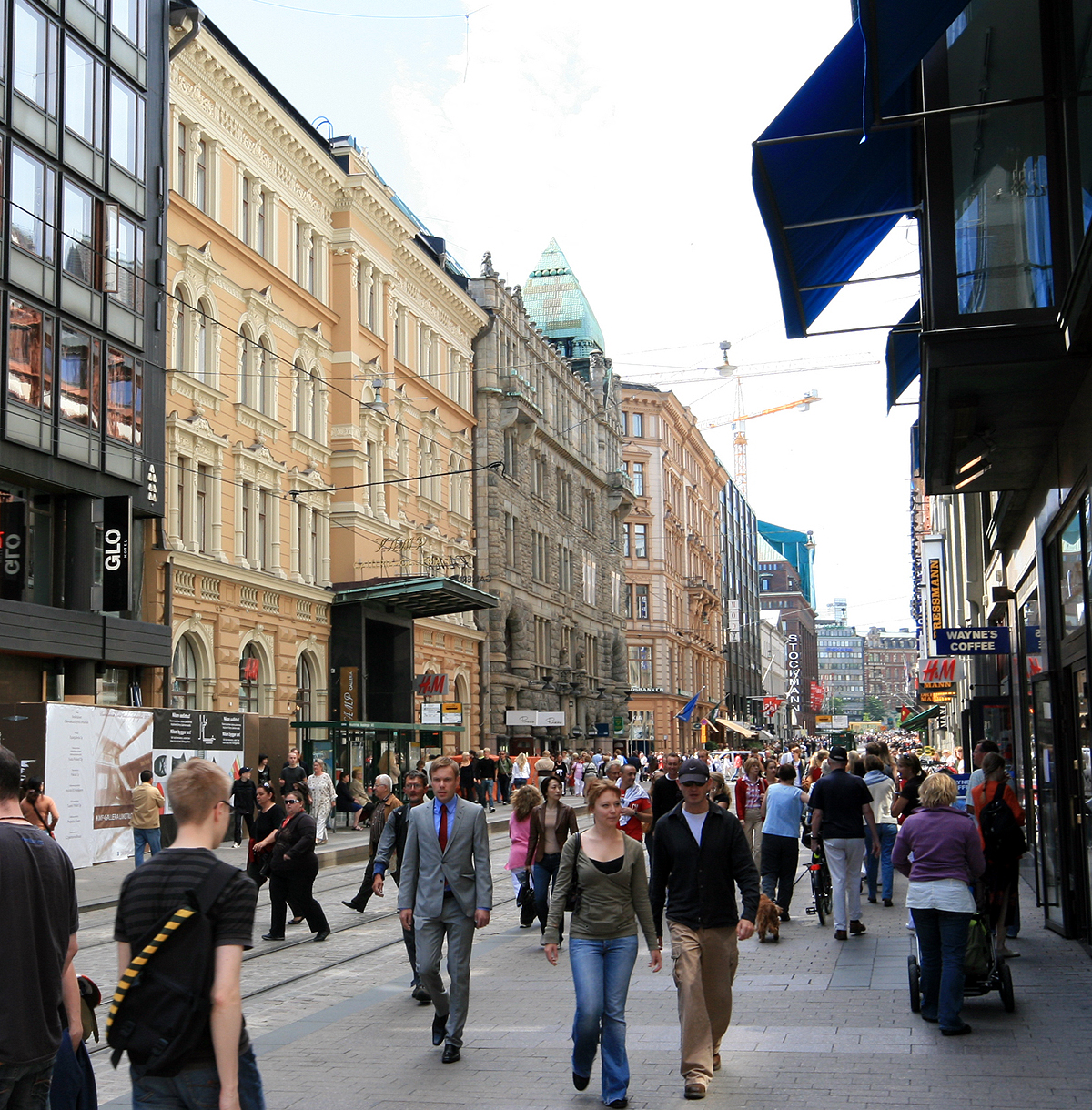
Aleksanterinkatu, Helsinki's main shopping street, 2007

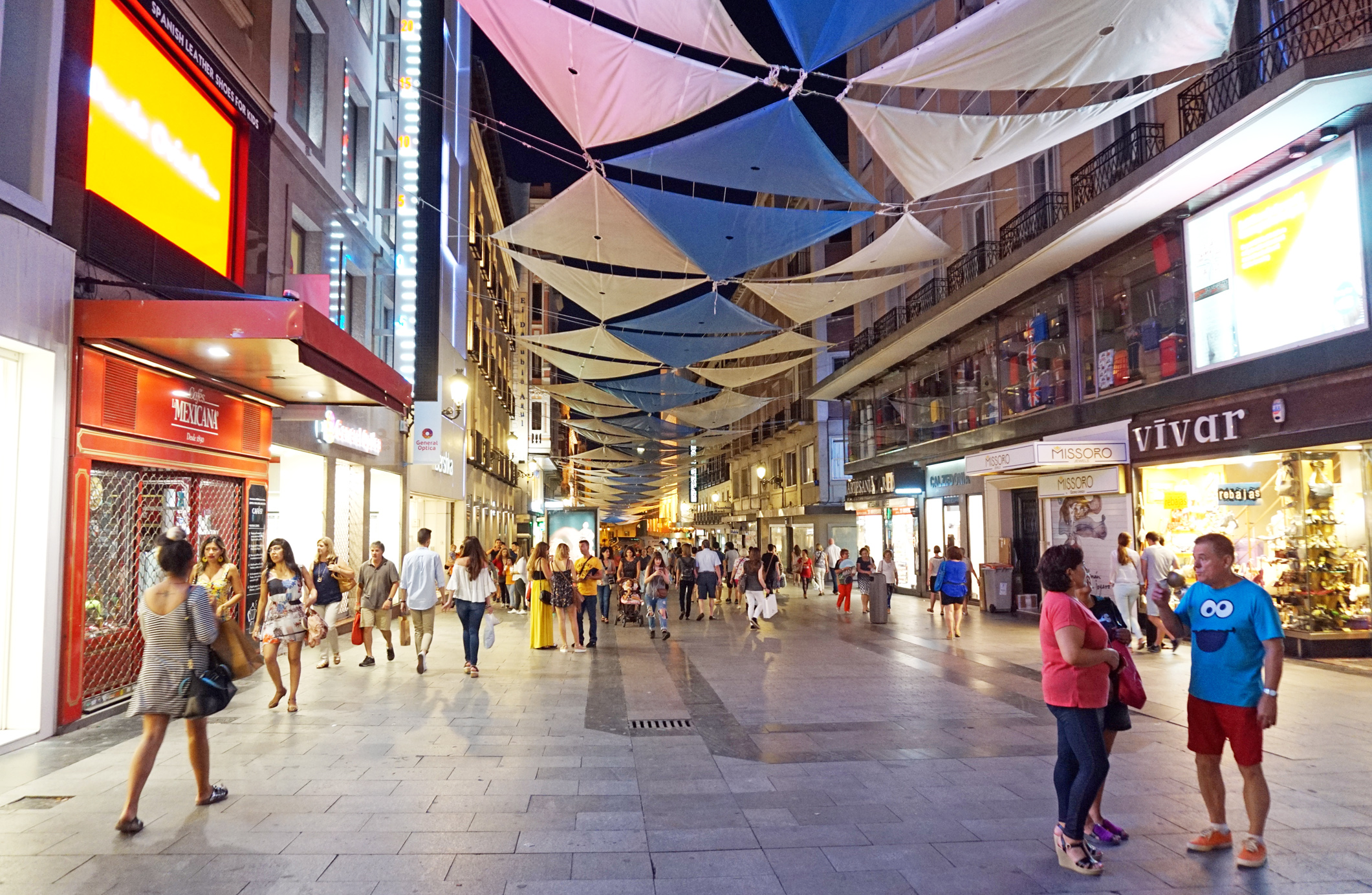
Calle de Preciados, Madrid

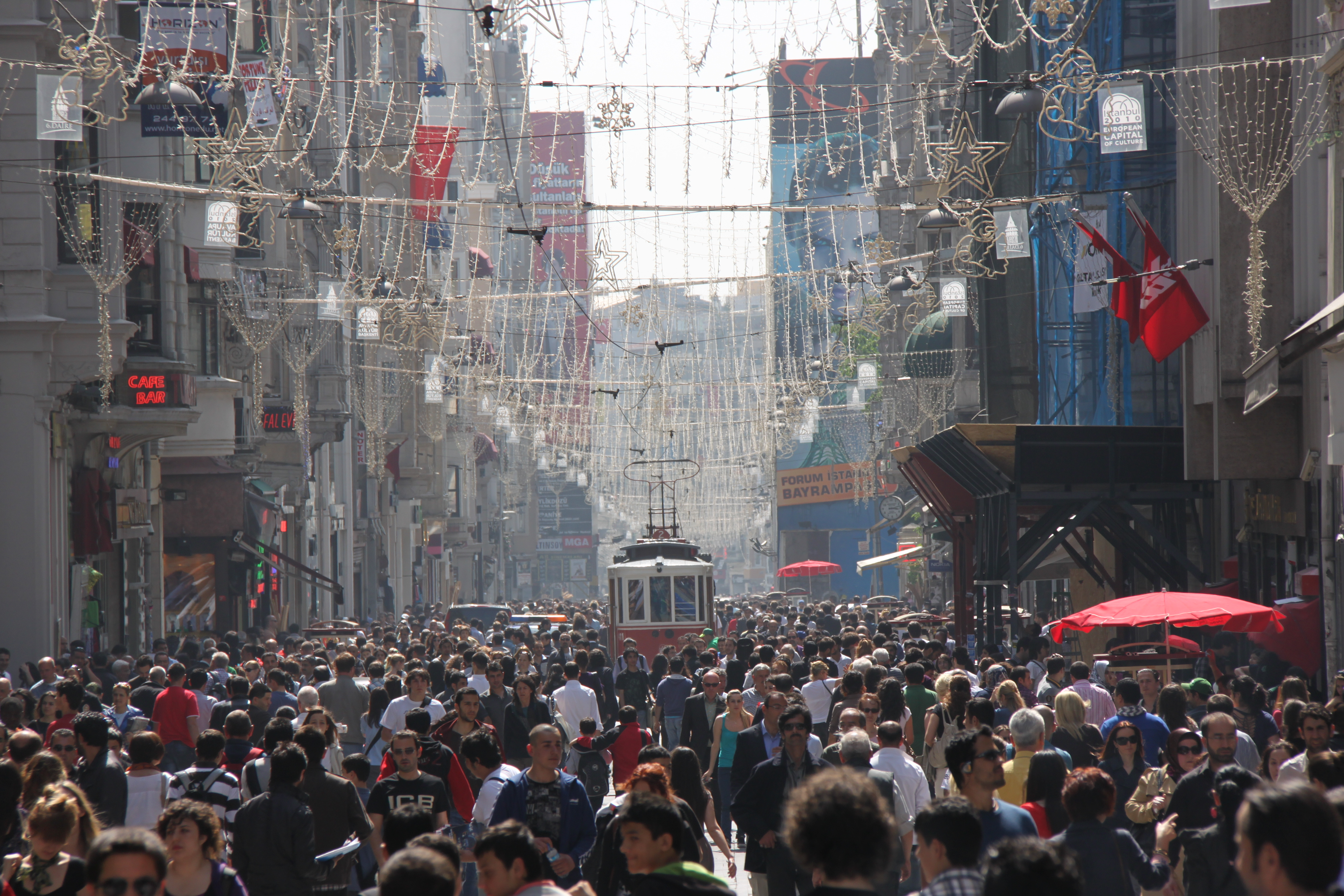
İstiklal Avenue, Istanbul

A large number of European towns and cities have made part of their centres car-free since the early 1960s. These are often accompanied by car parks on the edge of the pedestrianised zone, and, in the larger cases, park and ride schemes.

==== Armenia ====
Northern Avenue, located in the Kentron district of central Yerevan, is a large pedestrian avenue. The avenue was inaugurated in 2007 and is mainly home to residential buildings, offices, luxury shops and restaurants.

==== Azerbaijan ====
Nizami Street, commonly known as Torgoviy is a large pedestrian and shopping street in downtown Baku, Azerbaijan named after the classical Azerbaijani poet Nizami Ganjavi.

==== Belgium ====
In Belgium, Brussels has implemented Europe's largest pedestrian zone (French: Le Piétonnier), in phases starting in 2015; this will cover 50 hectares (120 acres). The area covers much of the historic center within the Small Ring (the ring road built on the site of the 14th-century walls), including the Grand-Place/Grote Markt, the Place de Brouckère/De Brouckèreplein, the Boulevard Anspach/Anspachlaan, and the Place de la Bourse/Beursplein.

==== Denmark ====
Central Copenhagen is one of the oldest and largest: it was converted from car traffic into a pedestrian zone in 1962 as an experiment, and is centered on Strøget, which is not a single street but a series of interconnected avenues which create a very large pedestrian zone, although it is crossed in places by streets with vehicular traffic. Most of these zones allow delivery trucks to service the businesses there during the early morning, and street-cleaning vehicles will usually go through these streets after most shops have closed for the night. It has grown in size from 15,800 square metres (3.9 acres) in 1962 to 95,750 square metres (23.66 acres) in 1996.

==== France ====
Several cities in France also developped large pedestrian zones. Among those, Montpellier has the largest, with a total of 160 ha pedestrian area in 2026, making it one of the biggest in Europe and the biggest in France.

==== Germany ====
A number of German islands ban or strictly limit the private use of motor vehicles. Helgoland, Hiddensee, and all but two of the East Frisian islands are car-free; Borkum and Norderney have car-free zones and strictly limit automobile use during the summer season and in certain areas, also forbidding travel at night. Some areas provide exceptions for police and emergency vehicles; Heligoland also bans bicycles.

In the early 1980s, the Alternative Liste für Demokratie und Umweltschutz (which later became part of Alliance 90/The Greens) unsuccessfully campaigned to make West Berlin a car-free zone.

==== Netherlands ====
In the Netherlands, the inner city of Arnhem has a pedestrian zone (Dutch: voetgangersgebied) within the boundaries of the following streets and squares: Nieuwe Plein, Willemsplein, Gele Rijdersplein, Looierstraat, Velperbinnensingel, Koningsplein, St. Catharinaplaats, Beekstraat, Walburgstraat, Turfstraat, Kleine Oord, and Nieuwe Oeverstraat.

Rotterdam's city center was almost completely destroyed by German bombing in May 1940. The city decided to build a central shopping street, for pedestrians only, the Lijnbaan, which became Europe's first purpose-built pedestrian street. The Lijnbaan served as a model for many other such streets in the early post-World War II era, such as Warsaw, Prague, Hamburg, and the UK's first pedestrianised shopping precinct in Stevenage in 1959. Rotterdam has since expanded the pedestrian zone to other streets. As of 2018, Rotterdam featured three different types of pedestrian zones: "pedestrian zones", "pedestrian zones, cycling permitted outside of shopping hours", and "pedestrian zones, cycling permitted 24/7". Three exceptions to motor vehicles could apply to specific sections of these three zones, namely: "logistics allowed within window times (5 to 10:30 a.m)", "logistics allowed 24/7", and "commercial traffic allowed during market days".

==== United Kingdom ====
In Britain, shopping streets primarily for pedestrians date back to the thirteenth century. A 1981 study found that many Victorian and later arcades continued to be used. A third of London's 168 precincts at that time had been built before 1939, as were a tenth of the 1,304 precincts in the U.K. as a whole.

Early post-1945 new towns carried on the tradition of providing some traffic-free shopping streets. However, in the conversion of traditional shopping streets to pedestrian precincts, Britain started only in 1967 (versus Germany's first conversion in 1929, or the first in the U.S. in 1959). Since then growth was rapid, such that by 1980 a study found that most British towns and cities had a pedestrian shopping precinct; 1,304 in total.

==== Turkey ====
In Istanbul, İstiklal Caddesi is a pedestrian street (except for a historic streetcar that runs along it) and a major tourist draw.

=== U.S. and Canada ===
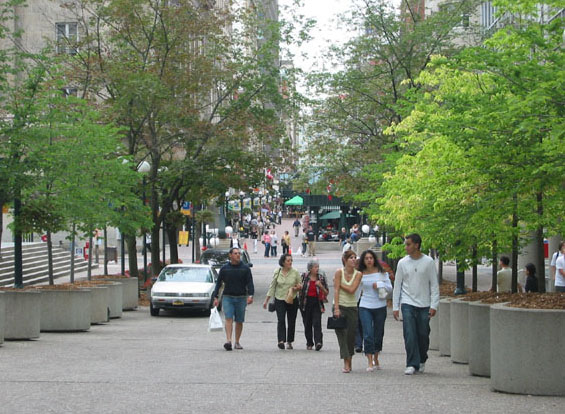
Ottawa Sparks Street Mall

==== Canada ====
Some Canadian examples are the Sparks Street Mall area of Ottawa, the Distillery District in Toronto, Scarth Street Mall in Regina, Stephen Avenue Mall in Calgary (with certain areas open to parking for permit holders) and part of Prince Arthur Street and the Gay Village in Montreal. Algonquin and Ward's Islands, parts of the Toronto Islands group, are also car-free zones for all 700 residents. Since summer 2004, Toronto has also been experimenting with "Pedestrian Sundays"Community - Culture - Ecology | P.S. Kensington in its busy Kensington Market. Granville Mall in Halifax, Nova Scotia was a run-down section of buildings on Granville Street built in the 1840s that was restored in the late 1970s. The area was then closed off to vehicles.

==== United States ====
===== Downtown pedestrian zones =====
In the United States, these zones are commonly called pedestrian malls or pedestrian streets and today are relatively rare, with a few notable exceptions. In 1959, Kalamazoo was the first American city to implement a "pedestrian mall" in its downtown core. This became a method that some cities applied for their downtowns to compete with the growing suburban shopping malls of the time. In the 1960s and 70s, over 200 towns in the United States adopted this approach.

The Downtown Mall in Charlottesville, VA is one of the longest pedestrian malls in the United States, created in 1976 and spanning nine city blocks. A number of streets and malls in New York City are now pedestrian-only, including 6½ Avenue, Fulton Street, parts of Broadway, and a block of 25th Street.

A portion of Third Street in Santa Monica in Greater Los Angeles was converted into a pedestrian mall in the 1960s to become what is now the Third Street Promenade, a very popular shopping district located just a few blocks from the beach and Santa Monica Pier.

Lincoln Road in Miami Beach, which had previously been a shopping street with traffic, was converted into a pedestrian only street in 1960. The designer was Morris Lapidus. Lincoln Road Mall is now one of the main attractions in Miami Beach.

The idea of exclusive pedestrian zones lost popularity through the 1980s and into the 1990s and results were generally disappointing, but are enjoying a renaissance with the 1989 renovation and relaunch of the Third Street Promenade in Santa Monica, California, the 1994-5 Fremont Street Experience in Las Vegas and recent pedestrianization of various streets in New York City. These pedestrian zones were more closely tied to the success of retail than in Europe, and by the 1980s, most did not succeed competing with ever more elaborate enclosed malls. Almost all of this generation of pedestrian malls built from 1959 through to the 1970s, have disappeared, or were shrunk down in the 1990s at the request of the retailers. Half of Kalamazoo's pedestrian mall has been converted into a regular street with auto traffic, though with wide sidewalks.

===== Outside large cities =====
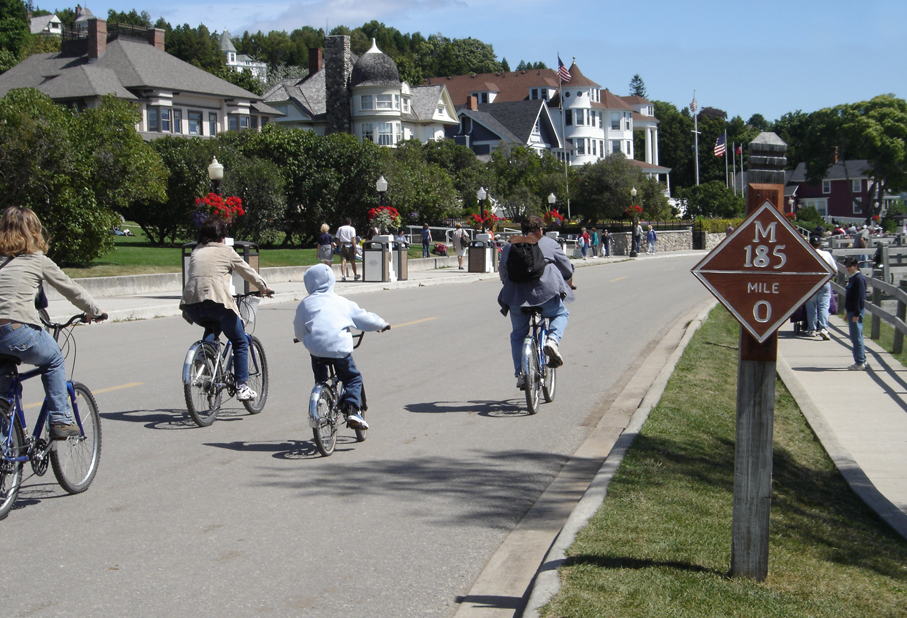
Cyclists enjoy the carfree highway (M-185) on Mackinac Island.

Mackinac Island, between the upper and lower peninsulas of Michigan, banned horseless carriages in 1896, making it auto-free. The original ban still stands, except for emergency vehicles. Travel on the island is largely by foot, bicycle, or horse-drawn carriage. An 8-mile (13 km) road, M-185 rings the island, and numerous roads cover the interior. M-185 is the only highway in the United States without motorized vehicles. Fire Island in Suffolk County, New York is pedestrianised east of the Fire Island Lighthouse and west of Smith Point County Park (with the exception of emergency vehicles).

Supai, Arizona, located within the Havasupai Indian Reservation is entirely car-free, the only community in the United States where mail is still carried out by mule. Supai is located eight miles from the nearest road, and is accessible only by foot, horse/mule, or helicopter.

Culdesac Tempe, a 17-acre (0.069 square kilometers) car-free district in Tempe, Arizona, is intended to be the nation's first market-rate rental apartment district to ban its tenants from owning cars. Bikes and emergency vehicles are allowed. It has received significant investments from executives at Lyft and Opendoor.

=== Latin America ===
==== Argentina ====
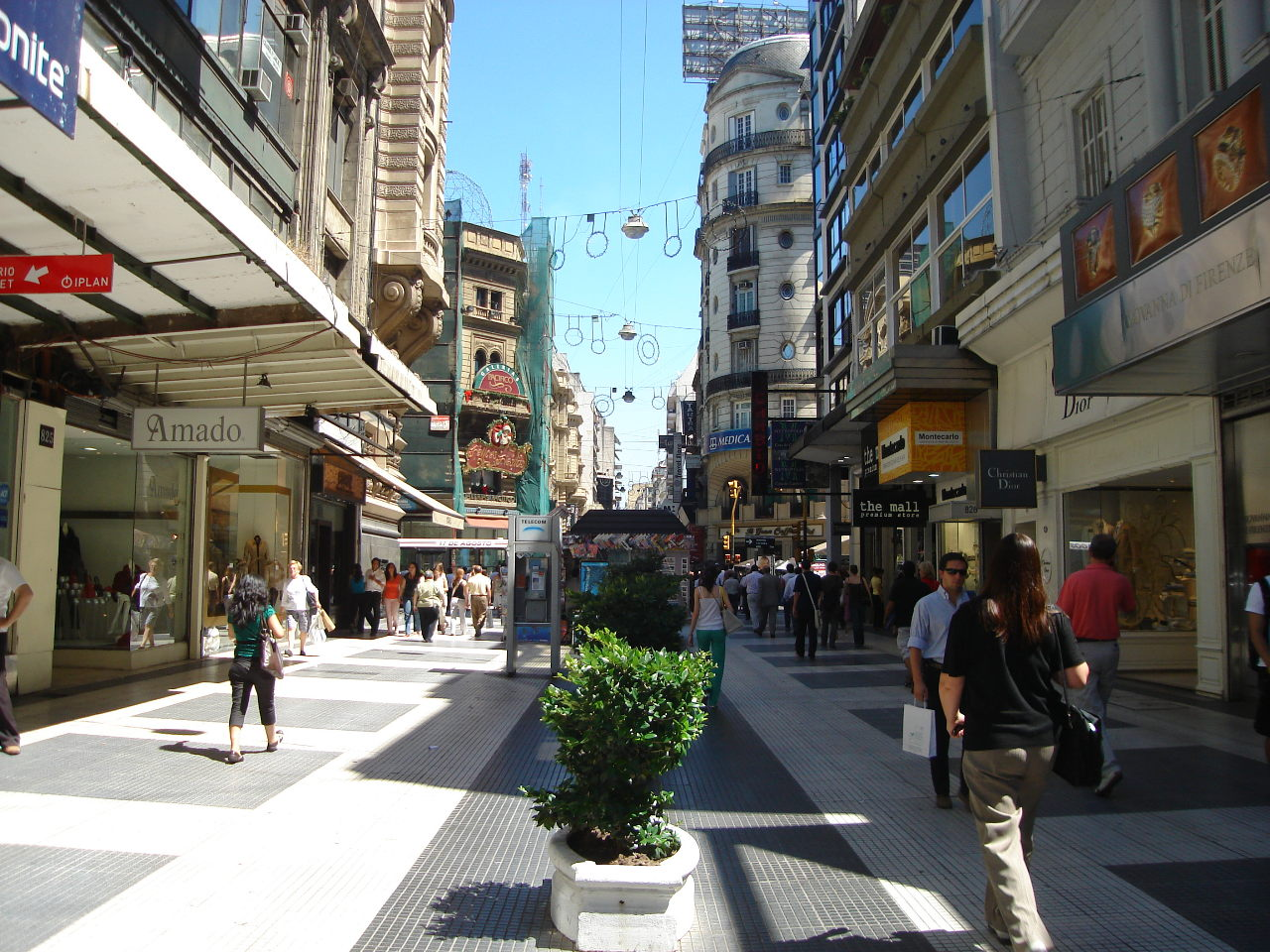
Florida Street, Buenos Aires, Argentina

Argentina's big cities, Córdoba, Mendoza and Rosario, have lively pedestrianised street centers (Spanish: peatonales) combined with town squares and parks which are crowded with people walking at every hour of the day and night.

In Buenos Aires, some stretches of Calle Florida have been pedestrianised since 1913, making it one of the oldest car-free thoroughfares in the world. Pedestrianised Florida, Lavalle and other streets have a shopping and restaurant scene with street performers and tango dancers; streets are crossed with vehicular traffic at chamfered corners.

==== Brazil ====
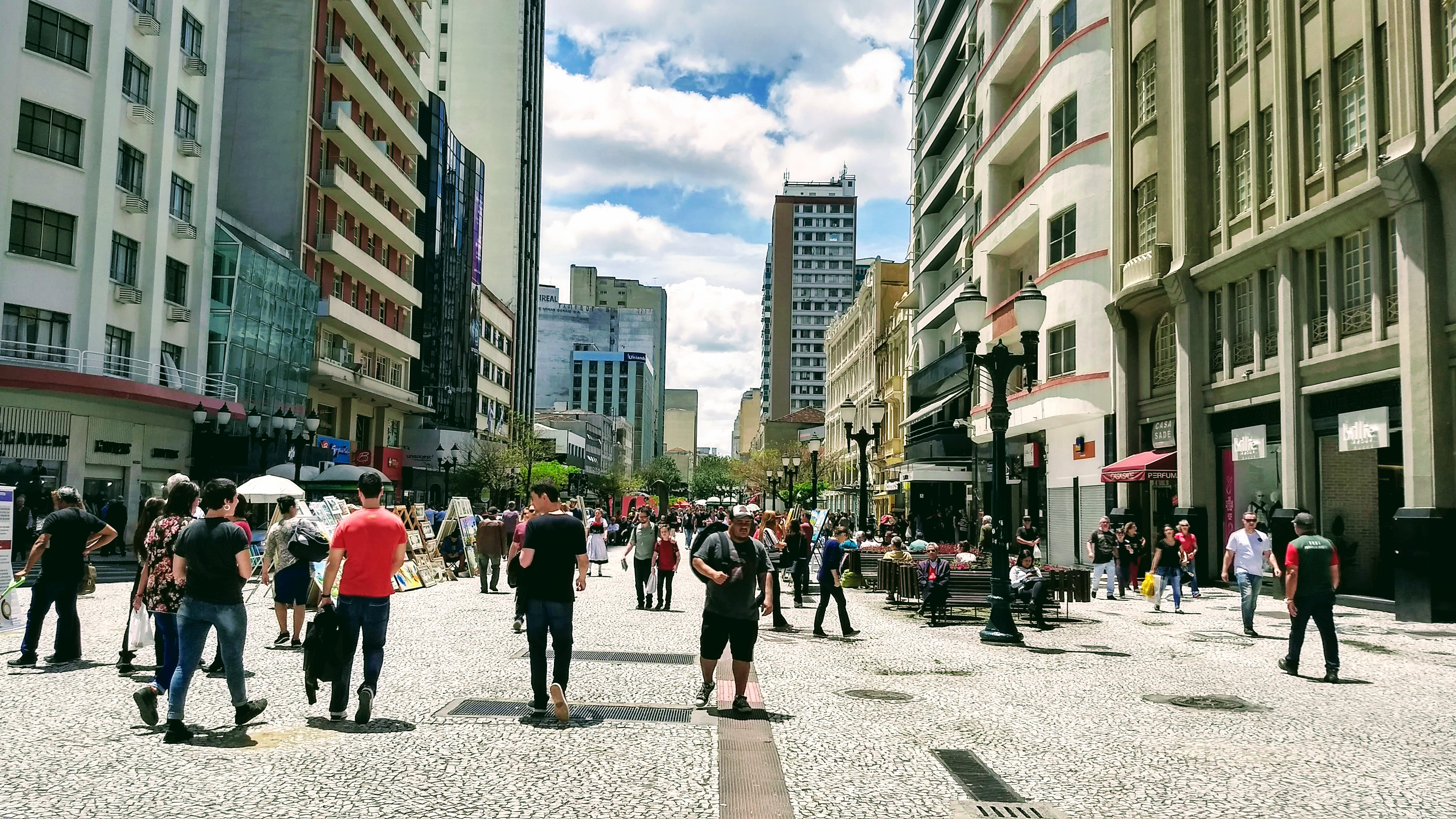
Rua XV de Novembro in Curitiba

Paquetá Island in Rio de Janeiro is auto-free. The only cars allowed on the island are police and ambulance vehicles. In Rio de Janeiro, the roads beside the beaches are auto-free on Sundays and holidays.

Downtown Rio de Janeiro, Ouvidor Street, over almost its entire length, has been continually a pedestrian space since the mid-nineteenth century when not even carts or carriages were allowed. And the Saara District, also downtown, consists of some dozen or more blocks of colonial streets, off-limits to cars, and crowded with daytime shoppers. Likewise, many of the city's hillside favelas are effectively pedestrian zones as the streets are too narrow and/or steep for automobiles.

Eixo Rodoviário, in Brasília, which is 13 kilometers long and 30 meters wide and is an arterial road connecting the center of that city from both southward and northward wings of Brasília, perpendicular to the well known Eixo Monumental (Monumental Axis in English), is auto-free on Sundays and holidays.

Rua XV de Novembro (15 November Street) in Curitiba is one of the first major pedestrian streets in Brazil.

==== Chile ====
Chile has many large pedestrian streets. An example is Paseo Ahumada and Paseo Estado in Santiago, Paseo Barros Arana in Concepción and Calle Valparaíso in Viña del Mar.

==== Colombia ====
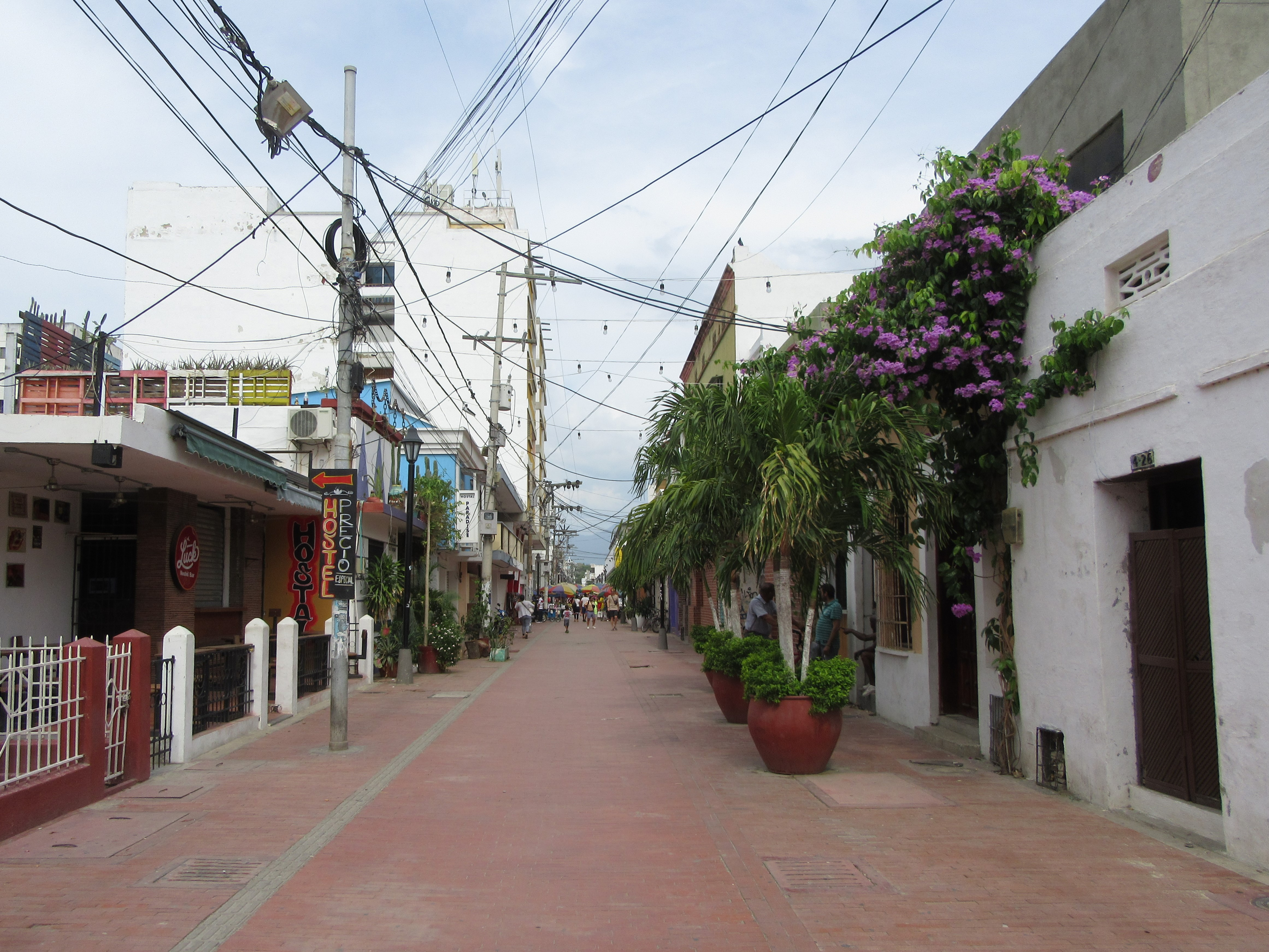
Tumbacuatro Street in Santa Marta

During his 1998–2001 term, the former Bogotá mayor, U.S.-born Enrique Peñalosa, created several pedestrian streets, plazas and bike paths integrated with a new bus rapid transit system.

The historic center of Cartagena closes some streets to cars during certain hours.

In downtown Armenia, Colombia there is a large pedestrian street where several boutiques are located.

Santa Marta also has permanent pedestrian zones in the historic center around the Cathedral Basílica of Santa Marta.

==== Mexico ====
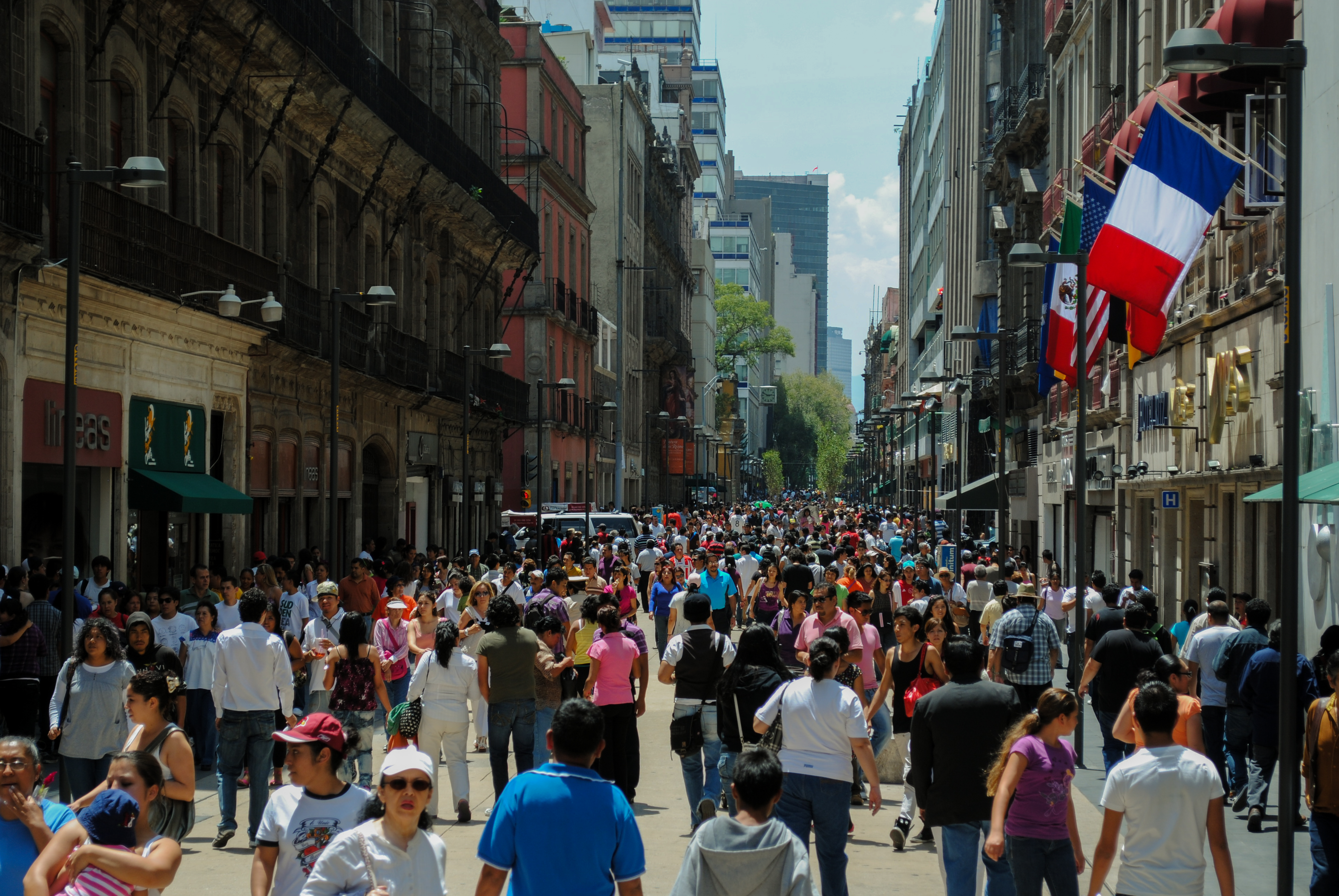
Madero Street in the Historic center of Mexico City

The Historic center of Mexico City has 12 pedestrian streets including Madero Street, and as of 30 June 2020, is expanding the number to 42 pedestrian streets. Génova is a busy pedestrian street in the Zona Rosa as is Plaza Garibaldi downtown, where mariachis play.

The old city of Guanajuato is largely pedestrian. The steep and/or narrow side streets were never accessible by cars and most other streets were pedestrianized in the 1960s after through traffic was moved to a system of former flood control tunnels that was no longer necessary due to a new dam.

Playa del Carmen has a pedestrian mall, Quinta Avenida, ("Fifth Avenue") that stretches 4 kilometres (2.5 mi) and receives 4 million visitors annually with hundreds of shops and restaurants.

==== Peru ====
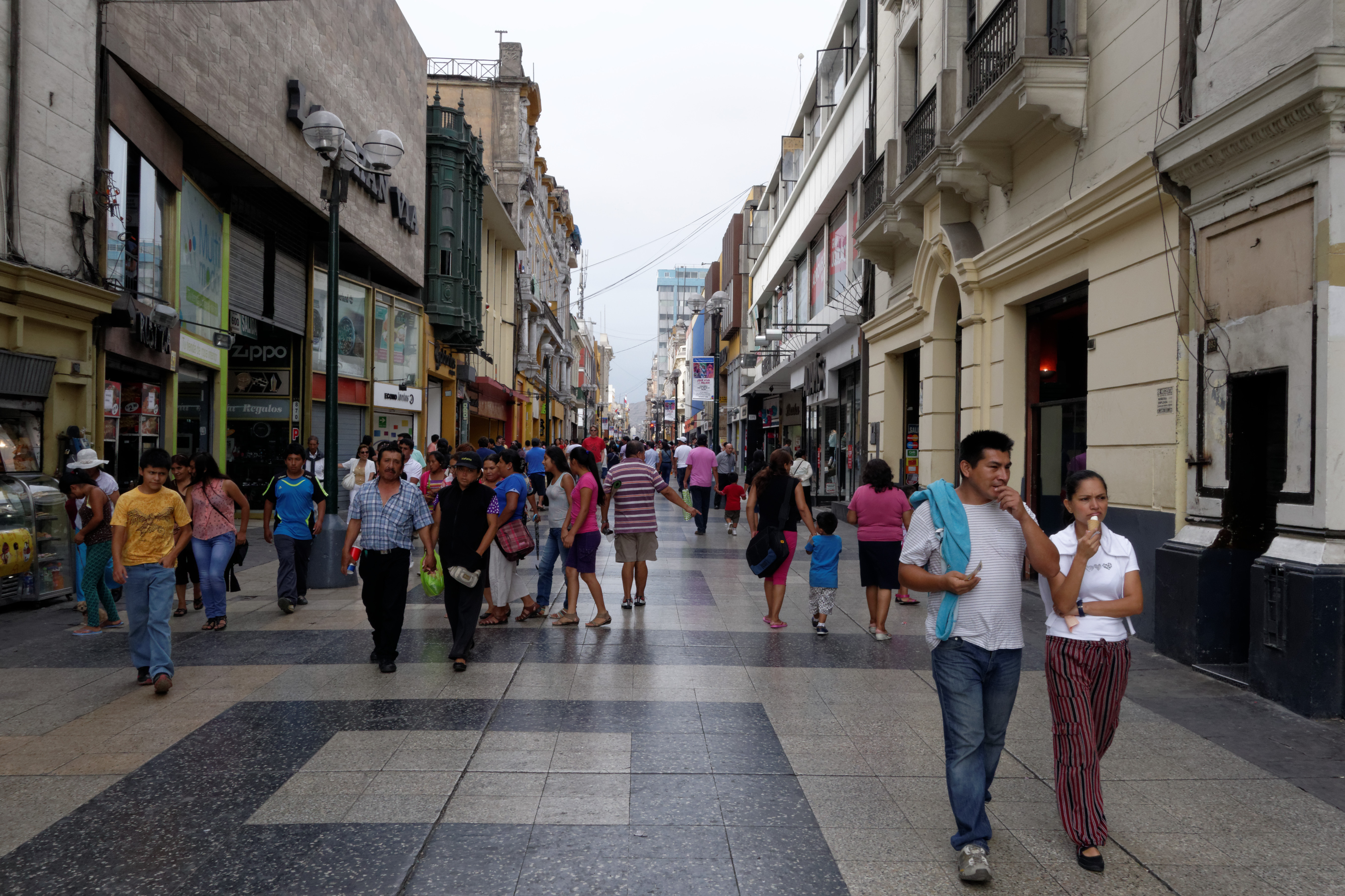
Jirón de la Unión in Lima

Jirón de La Unión in Lima is a traditional pedestrian street located in the Historic Centre of Lima, part of the capital of Peru.

In the city of Arequipa, Mercaderes is also a considerably large pedestrian street. Also, recently three of the four streets surrounding the city's main square or "Plaza de Armas" were also made pedestrian.

=== South and East Asia ===
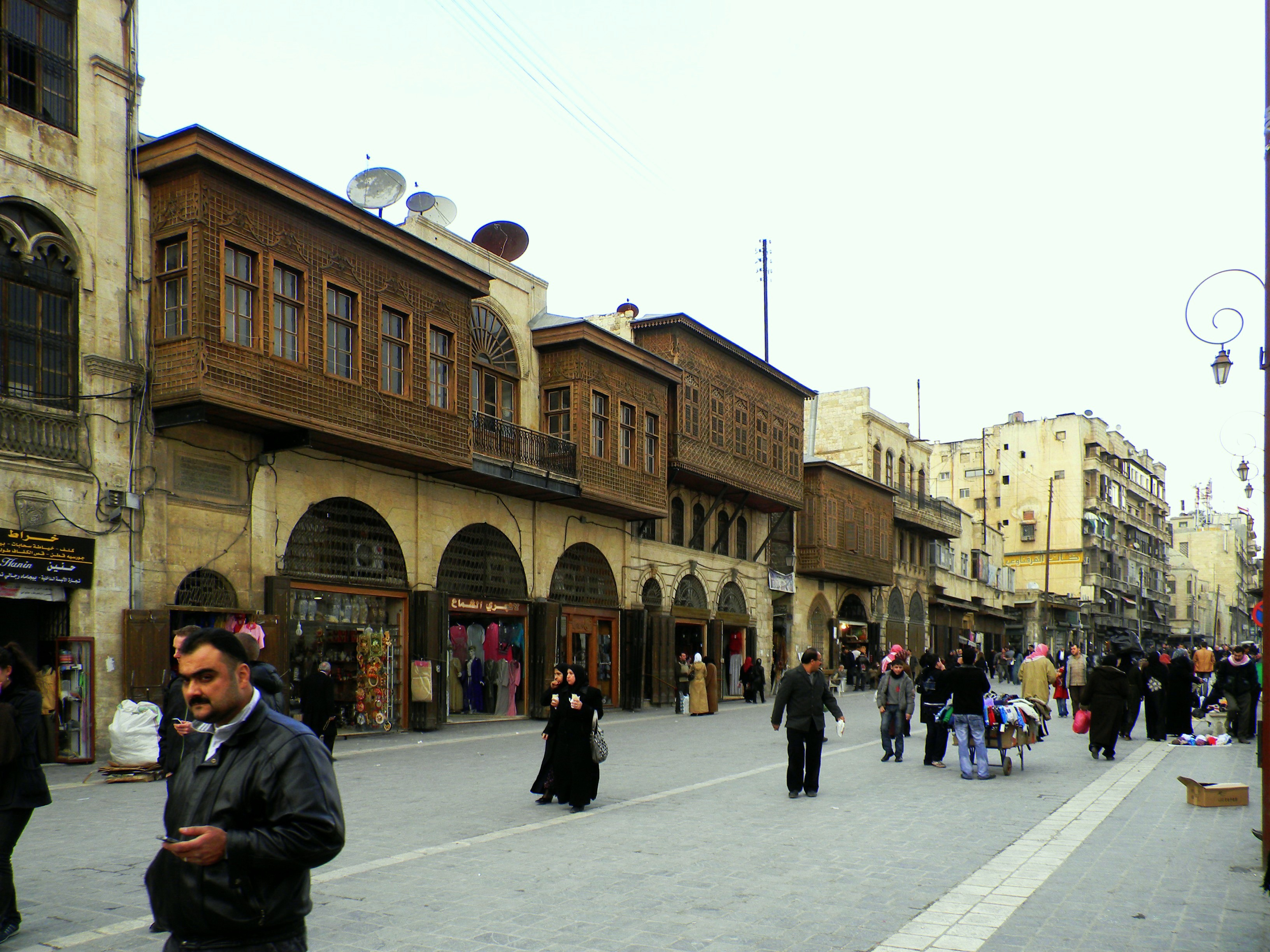
Ancient City of Aleppo, the walkway at al-Madina Souq

==== Mainland China ====
Nanjing Road in Shanghai is perhaps the most well-known pedestrian zone in mainland China. Wangfujing is a famous tourist and retail oriented pedestrian zone in Beijing. Chunxilu in Chengdu is the most well known in western China. Dongmen is the busiest business zone in Shenzhen. Zhongyang Street is a historical large pedestrian street in Harbin.

==== Hong Kong ====
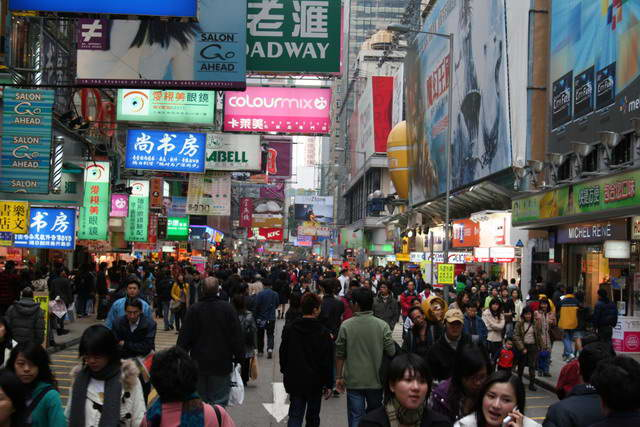
Sai Yeung Choi Street in Hong Kong

In Hong Kong, since 2000, the government has been implementing full-time or part-time pedestrian streets in a number of areas, including Causeway Bay, Central, Wan Chai, Mong Kok, and Tsim Sha Tsui. The most popular pedestrian street is Sai Yeung Choi Street. It was converted into a pedestrian street in 2003. From December 2008 to May 2009, there were three acid attacks during which corrosive liquids were placed in plastic bottles and thrown from the roof of apartments down onto the street.

==== India ====
Vehicles have been banned in the town of Matheran, in Maharashtra, India since the time it was discovered in 1854.

In India, a citizens' initiative in Goa state, has made 18 June Road, Panjim's main shopping boulevard a Non-Motorised Zone(NoMoZo). The road is converted into a NoMoZo for half a day on one Sunday every month.

In Pune, Maharashtra, similar efforts have been made to convert M.G. Road (a.k.a. Main Street) into an open-air mall. The project in question aimed to create a so-called "Walking Plaza".

In May 2019, the North Delhi Municipal Corporation (NDMC) made the busy Ajmal Khan Road in Karol Bagh pedestrian-only.

Church Street in Bangalore went through a pedestrianization process

==== Japan ====
Pedestrian zones in Japan are called hokōsha tengoku (歩行者天国, literally "pedestrian heaven"). Clis Road, in Sendai, Japan, is a covered pedestrian mall, as is Hondōri in Hiroshima. Several major streets in Tokyo are closed to vehicles during weekends. One particular hokōsha tengoku that exists in Akihabara, since 1973, was temporarily suspended for about two and a half years after the Akihabara massacre in which a man rammed a truck into the pedestrian traffic and subsequently stabbed more than 12 people.

==== South Korea ====
Insadong in Seoul, South Korea has a large pedestrian zone (Insadong-gil) during certain hours.

Also in South Korea, in 2013, in the Haenggun-dong neighbourhood of Suwon, streets were closed to cars as a month-long car-free experiment while the city hosted the EcoMobility World Festival. Instead of cars, residents used non-motorized vehicles provided by the festival organizers. The experiment was not unopposed; however, on balance it was considered a success. Following the festival, the city embarked on discussions about adopting the practice on a permanent basis.

==== Taiwan ====
Ximending in Wanhua District, Taipei is a neighbourhood and shopping district. It was the first pedestrian zone in Taiwan. The district is very popular in Taiwan. In central Taiwan, Yizhong Street is one of the most popular pedestrian shopping area in Taichung. In Southern Taiwan, the most famous pedestrian shopping area is Shinkuchan in Kaohsiung.

==== Thailand ====
In Thailand, some small streets (soi) in Bangkok are designed to be all-time closed to automobile traffic, the city's famous shopping streets of Sampheng Lane in Chinatown and Wang Lang Market nearby to Siriraj Hospital, are the most popular for both local and tourists shopping streets. Additionally the city has built long skywalk systems. Walking Street, Pattaya is also closed to auto traffic. Night markets are routinely closed to auto traffic.

==== Vietnam ====
Huế in Vietnam has made 3 roads into pedestrians-only on weekend nights. Also, Hanoi has opened an Old Quarter Walking Street on weekend nights. Ho Chi Minh City also changed Nguyễn Huệ street into pedestrian zone.

=== Middle East and North Africa ===
North Africa contains some of the largest auto-free areas in the world. Fes-al-Bali, a medina of Fes, Morocco, with its population of 156,000, may be the world's largest contiguous completely carfree area, and the medinas of Cairo, Tunis, Casablanca, Meknes, Essaouira, and Tangier are quite extensive.

In Israel, Tel Aviv has a pedestrian mall, near Nahalat Binyamin Street. Ben Yehuda Street in Jerusalem is a pedestrian mall.

=== Oceania ===
==== Australia ====
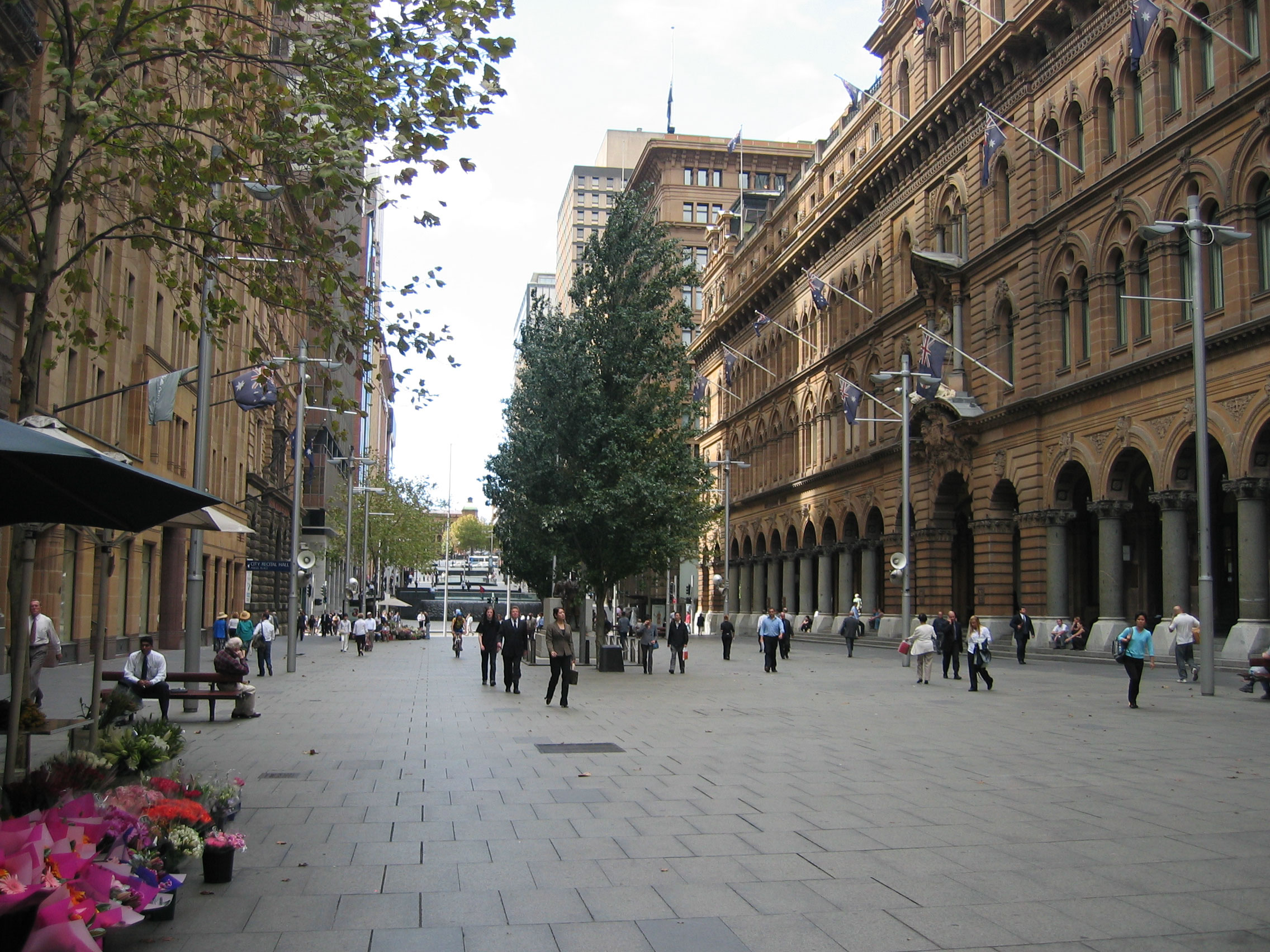
Martin Place, Sydney, Australia

In Australia, as in the US, these zones are commonly called pedestrian malls and in most cases comprise only one street. Most pedestrian streets were created in the late 1970s and 1980s, the first being City Walk, Garema Place in Canberra in 1971. Of 58 pedestrian streets created in Australia in the last quarter of the 20th century, 48 remain today, ten having re-introduced car access between 1990 and 2004. All capital cities in Australia have at least one pedestrian street of which most central are: George Street, Pitt Street Mall and Martin Place in Sydney, Bourke Street Mall in Melbourne, Queen Street Mall and Brunswick Street Mall in Brisbane, Rundle Mall in Adelaide, Hay Street and Murray Street Malls in Perth, Elizabeth Street Mall in Hobart, City Walk in Canberra, and Smith Street in Darwin. Many other mid-sized and regional Australian cities also feature pedestrian malls, examples include Rooke Street Devonport Langtree Avenue Mildura, Cavill Avenue Surfers Paradise, Bridge Street Ballarat, Nicholas Street Ipswich, Hargreaves Street Bendigo, Maude Street Shepparton and Little Mallop Street Geelong.

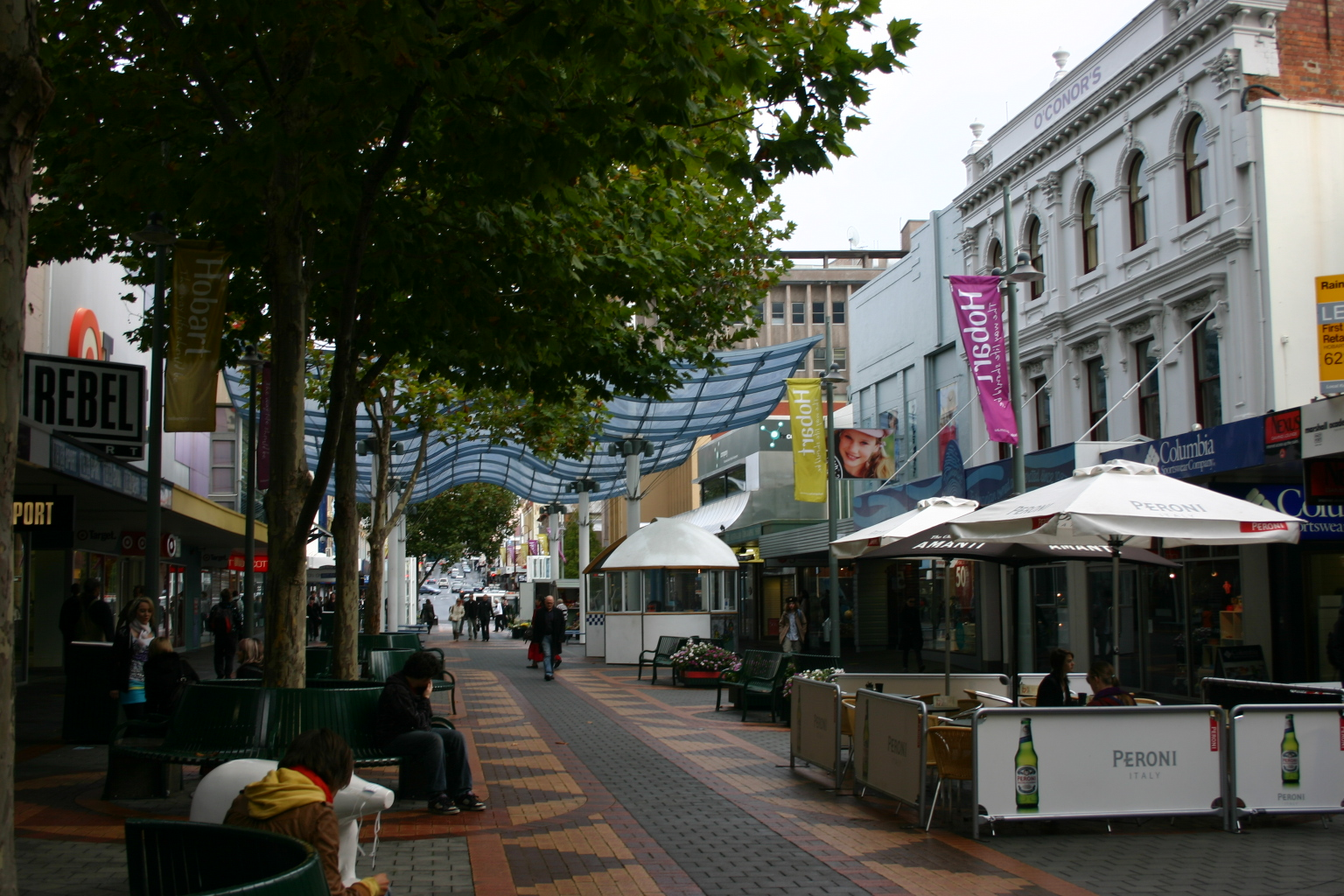
Elizabeth Street Mall, Hobart, Australia

Empirical studies by Jan Gehl indicate an increase of pedestrian traffic as result of public domain improvements in the centres of Melbourne with 39% increase between 1994 and 2004 and Perth with 13% increase between 1993 and 2009.

Most intensive pedestrian traffic flows on a summer weekday have been recorded in Bourke Street Mall Melbourne with 81,000 pedestrians (2004), Rundle Mall Adelaide with 61,360 pedestrians (2002), Pitt Street Mall Sydney with 58,140 (2007) and Murray Street Mall Perth with 48,350 pedestrians (2009).

Rottnest Island off Perth is car-free, only allowing vehicles for essential services. Bicycles are the main form of transport on the island; they can be hired or brought over on the ferry.

In Melbourne's north-eastern suburbs, there have been many proposals to make the Doncaster Hill development area a pedestrian zone. If the proposals are passed, the zone could be one of the largest in the world, by area.

==== New Zealand ====
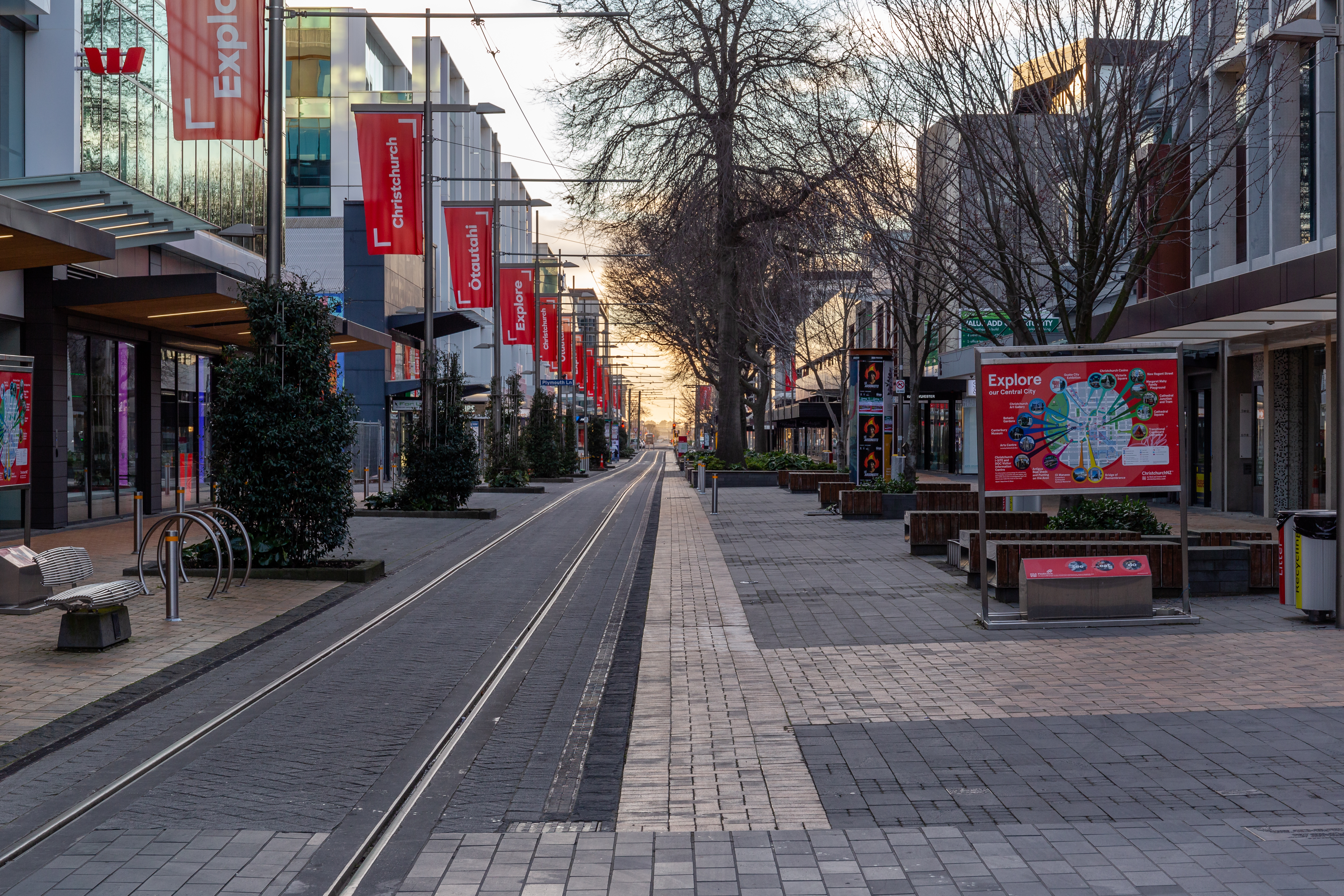
Cashel Street, 2019

Wellington's Cuba Street became the first pedestrian-only street in New Zealand when in 1965 the Wellington tramway lines were removed and the street was closed off to auto traffic, and after public pressure to keep it closed to automobiles, part of the street was pedestrianised in 1969 and reopened as Cuba Mall.

New Zealand's second-largest city, Christchurch, made its main shopping streets (Cashel & High Street) pedestrian-only in 1982 and created City Mall, also commonly known as Cashel Mall. The concept was first proposed in 1965, around the same time Wellington proposed Cuba Street's pedestrianisation. After the success of Cuba Mall in Wellington, Christchurch decided to continue with the plans. In 1976 the Bridge of Remembrance was pedestrianised, and eventually in August 1982 the entire City Mall was pedestrianised and fully opened to the public. The area was repaved in the late 2000s and again after the Christchurch Earthquakes in 2010 & 2011.

Queenstown has made most of its town centre a pedestrian zone with the lower part of Ballarat Street converted in the 1970s and turned into Queenstown Mall. Most recently, Lower Beach Street has been partially pedestrianised with now only one-way traffic for cars.

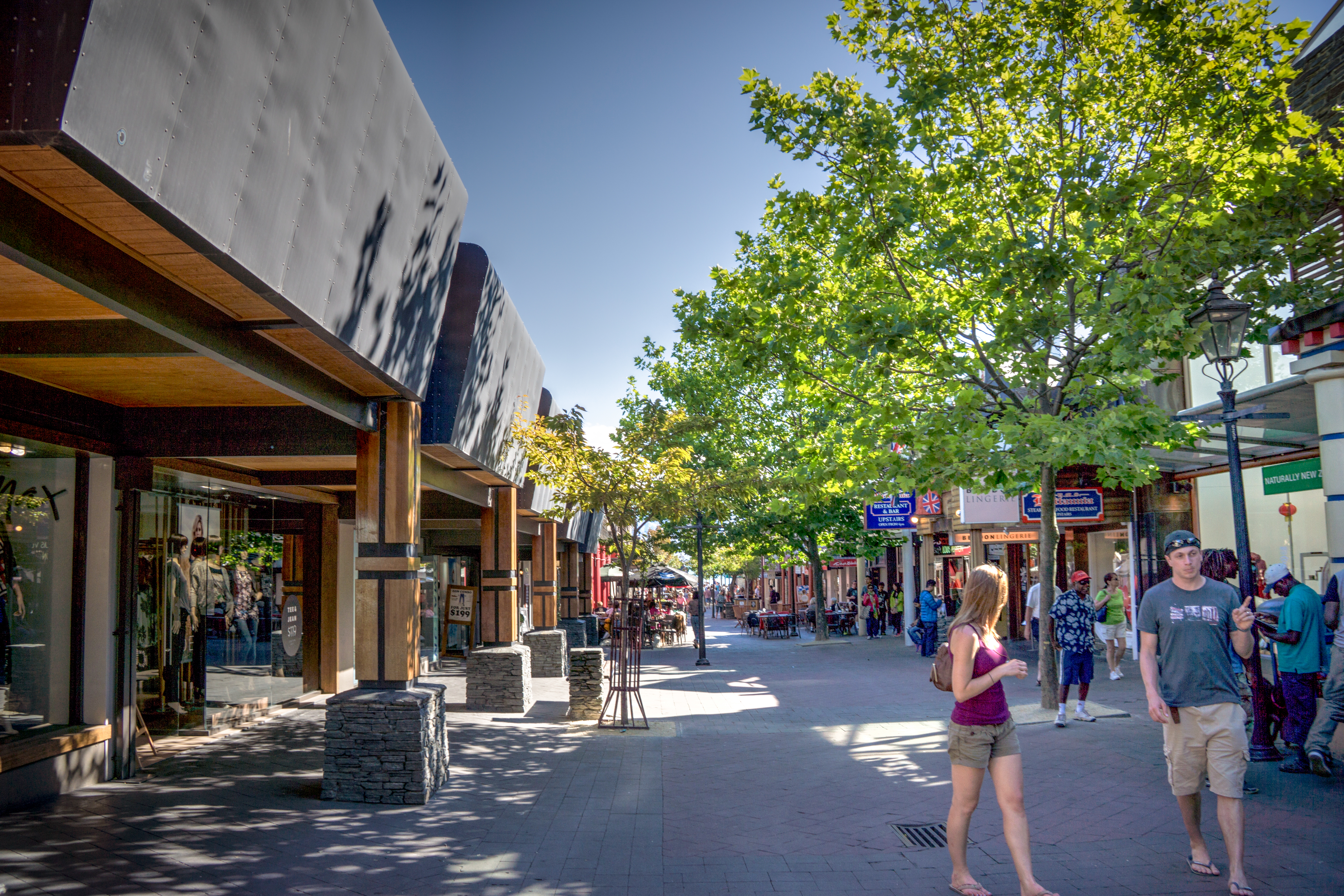
Queenstown Mall

Auckland's Lower Queen Street was pedestrianised in 2020.

Town Centre–style pedestrian malls rose in popularity in the 1970 & 1980s, springing up around New Zealand after the success of Cuba Mall. Many, however, have since fallen into disrepair and abandonment and are now classified as Dead malls, including Bishopdale Village Mall, Otara Town Centre, and New Brighton Mall. Pedestrian malls are still being built, however much more scarcely and now are usually called Town Centres and have parking on the outskirts, including Rolleston Fields, The Sands Town Centre, and The Landing Wigram.

A proposal has been made for a pedestrian priority community near Papakura in Auckland. The community would be called Sunfield and cost $4 Billion NZD to build. It is designed to have 4,400 homes and is projected to decrease normal car usage by 90% compared to typical suburbs. It has run into challenges after the project being rejected by Kāinga Ora for fast-tracking following Covid-19; construction authorities took Kāinga Ora to court over the matter.

== See also ==
- Carfree city
- Car-free days
- Car-free movement
- Footpath
- Jan Gehl
- List of car-free places
- Mobility transition
- Living street – Traffic calming in spaces shared between road users
- Naked street – Road designed without traditional signs
- Pedestrian village – Urban planning for mixed-use areas prioritising pedestrians
- Principles of intelligent urbanism
- Street hierarchy – Urban planning restricting through traffic of automobiles
- Street reclamation – Changing streets to focus on non-car use
- Transit mall – Urban street reserved for public transit, bicycles, and pedestrians
- Urban vitality

== Sources ==
- Melia, Steve (2010). "Carfree, low-car – What's the Difference?" (PDF). World Transport Policy and Practice 16. 16 (2). Eco-Logica Ltd.: 24–32.
