= Conklin Mountain House =

Historic house in New York, United States

- U.S. National Register of Historic Places
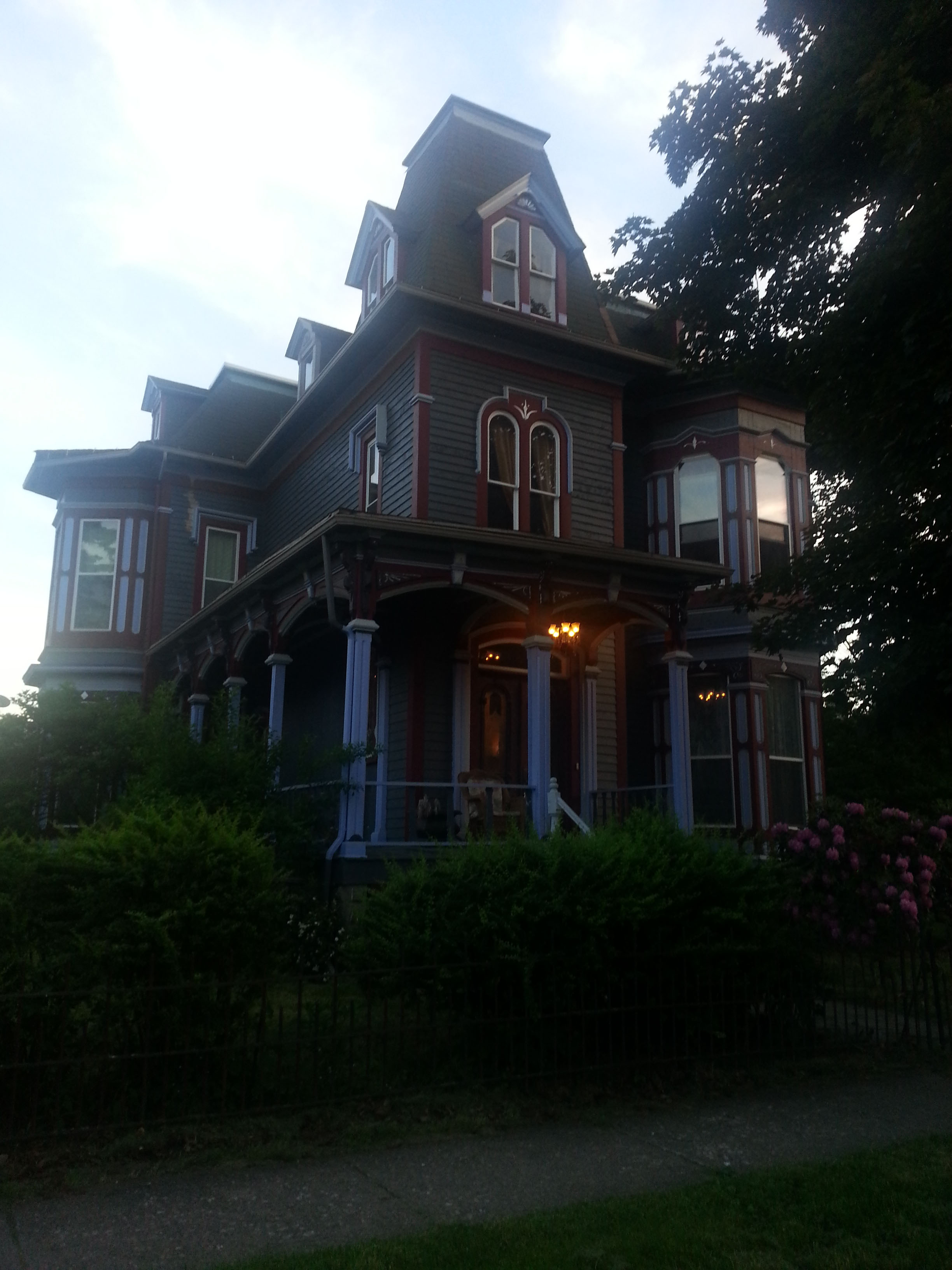
- Conklin Mountain House, September 2016

- Location within New York Location within the United States
- Location: 304 E. State St., Olean, New York
- Coordinates: 42°4′38″N 78°25′33″W
- Architect: Conklin, William C. and Dewitt
- Architectural style: Second Empire
- NRHP reference No.: 98001386
- Added to NRHP: November 19, 1998

Conklin Mountain House is a historic home located at Olean in Cattaraugus County, New York. The above ground portion of the main house is a 4,500 sq. ft Second Empire style wood frame dwelling built in 1886. The front facade features a three-story tower with mansard roof and a wraparound porch. The exterior of the home features extensive overhanging eaves, decorative brackets and balustrades. The house sits on top of a 2,000 sq. ft full-height stone basement. The property also includes a 1,600 sq. ft two-story carriage house.

The interior features elaborate and extensive woodwork, quarter-sawn oak floors throughout the house, one of the longest cantilevered staircases on the East Coast of the United States, a large and ornate antique Eastlake-style chandelier in the dining room, and the only known existing installation of M.H. Birge & Sons block-printed peacock wallpaper ca. 1915. The home was constructed by the owners of Conklin Wagon Works, one of Olean's most important industries in the late 19th century. It was subsequently owned by the Mountain family, who operated the Mountain Clinic Infirmary, and is currently an owner-occupied single family residence not open to the public. On the morning of October 8, 2023 the house caught fire, resulting in the residents being displaced and a total loss of the historic interiors.

It was listed on the National Register of Historic Places in 1998.

The home caught fire the morning of October 8, 2023, and subsequently demolished in 2025.

== History ==
The home was built in 1886 by William H. Conklin. Mr. Conklin was born on December 21, 1811, in Greenfield, Saratoga County, New York. In 1860 he moved his wagon-making business to Olean; the famous Conklin Wagon Works. It became one of Olean's most important industries at that time, eventually growing to employ 50 skilled laborers with an output of 2000 wagons per year. The wagon works was located closer to the Allegheny River than the house itself, which sits some 600 feet away. This was for purposes of using the river systems for transportation of materials and completed wagons.

== First Floor ==
The first floor of the home, used mainly for entertaining guests, features 12 foot ceilings throughout and contains the vestibule, foyer, first parlor or "music room", library, second parlor or "drawing room", a formal dining room and kitchen.

=== Vestibule and Foyer ===
The vestibule is a small space approximately 16 feet square. It's the first space encountered upon entering the home and is separated from the foyer by a double-door. The foyer contains access to the main staircase with a large carved newel post made from cherry and Birds-Eye Maple. The staircase and landings are cantilevered above the first floor and feature a continuous varnished maple railing supported by 102 turned spindles.

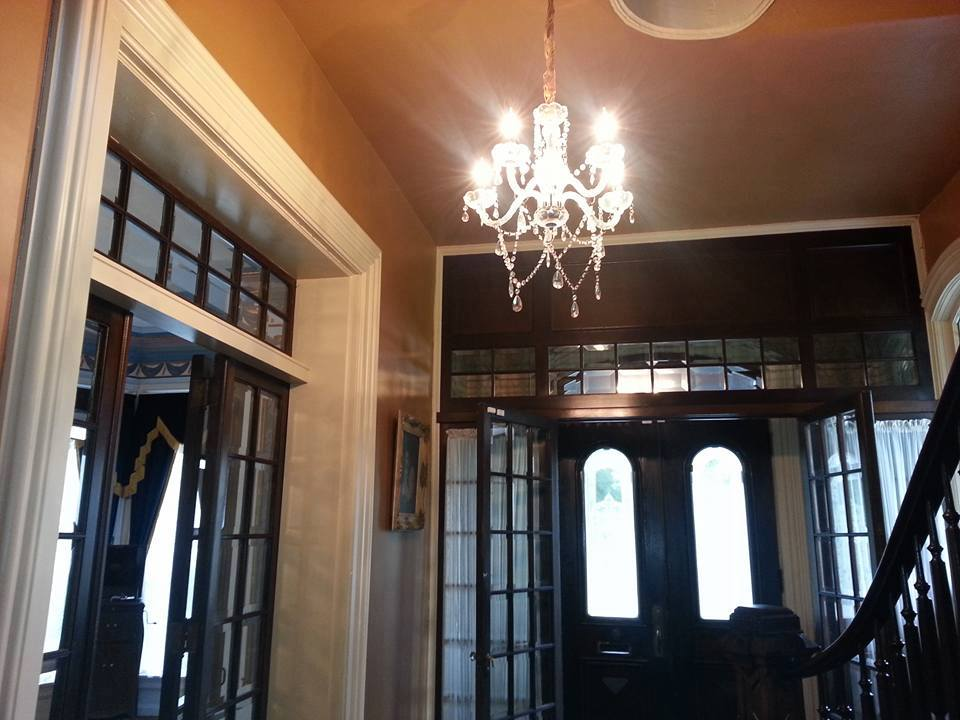
Vestibule and Foyer

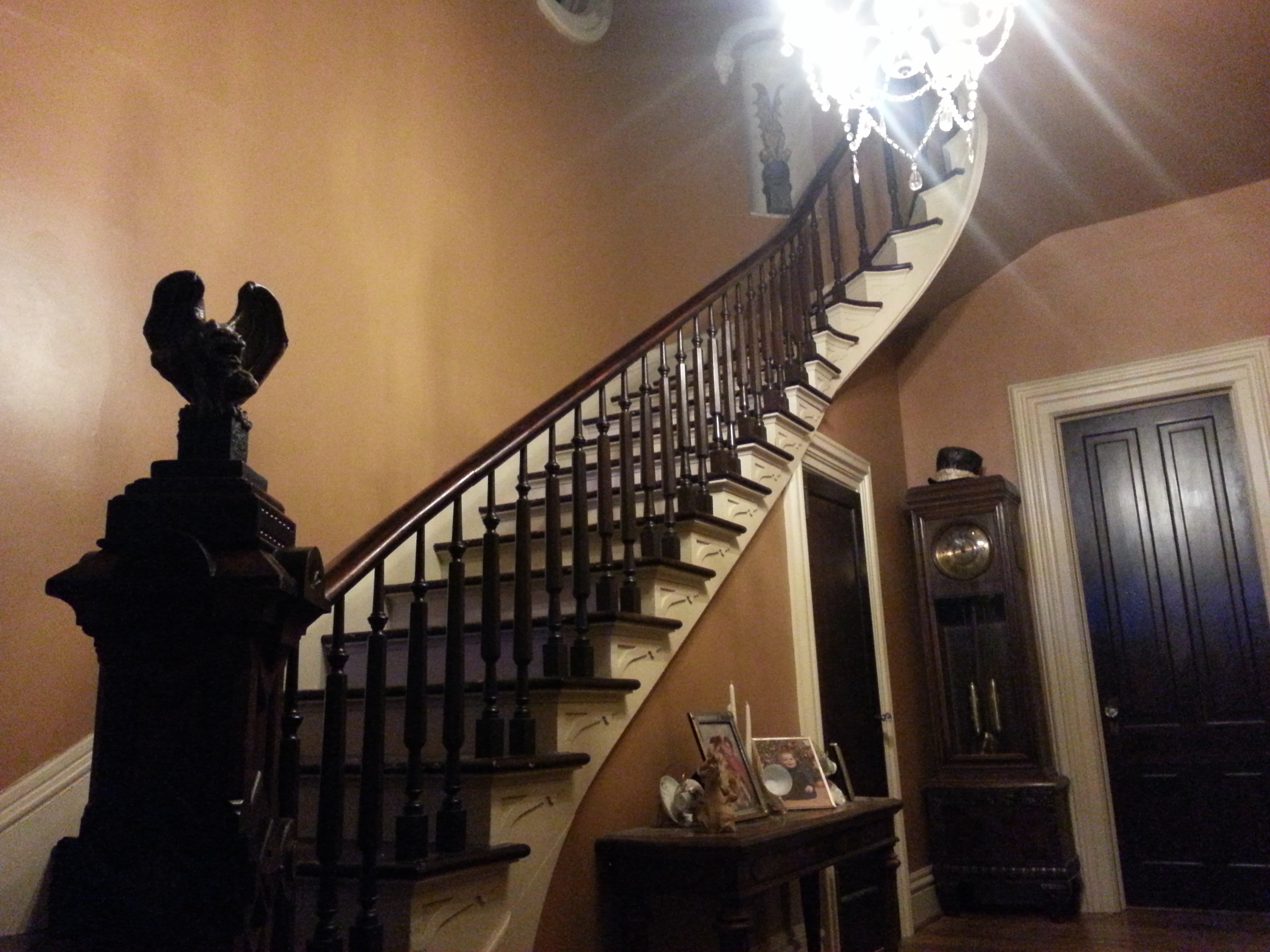
Main staircase

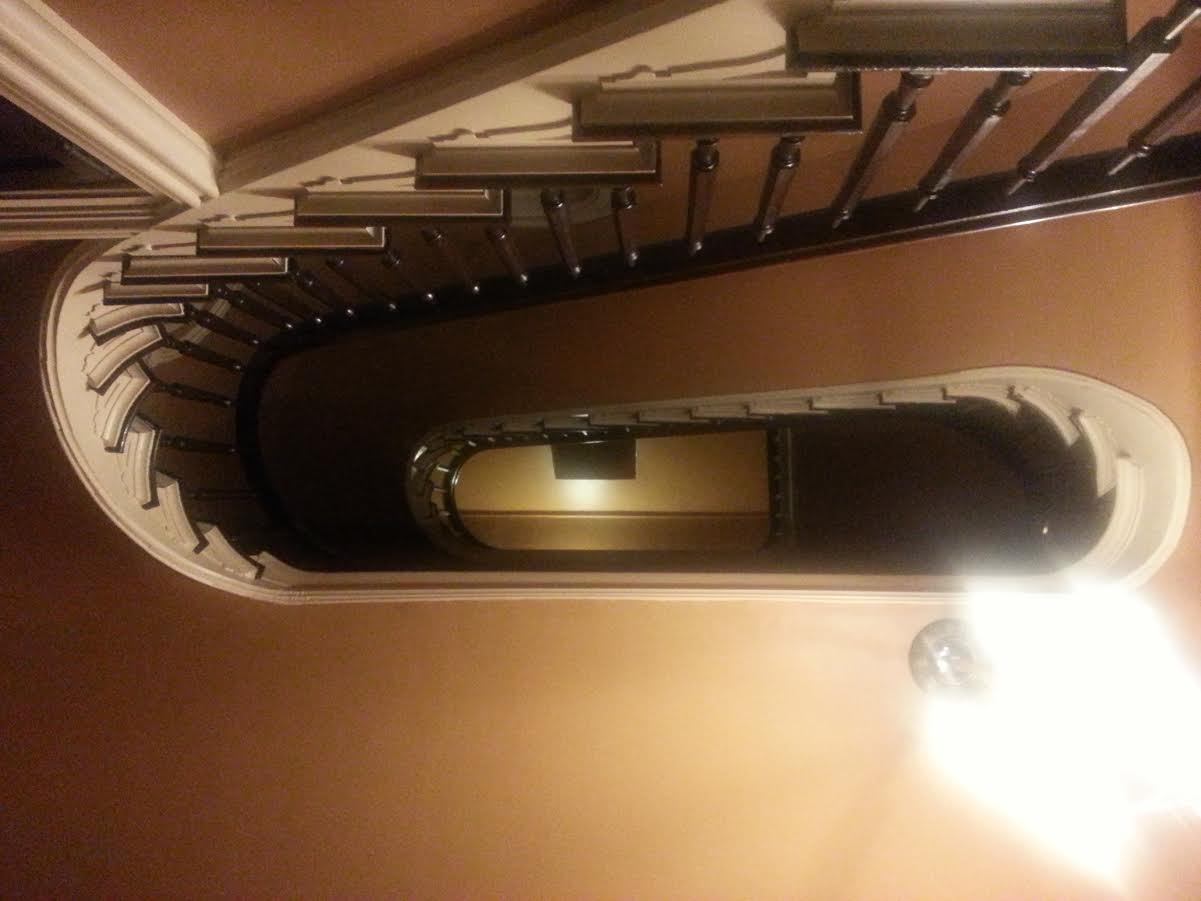
Looking straight up the stairwell, April 2017

=== Music Room ===
The first parlor, also known as the "blue room" or "Music room" features blue wallpaper inside of decorative wall moldings and is the scene of most seasonal celebrations. During the Christmas season the largest tree is placed in the bay window of this room. It houses the grand piano and Victrola, among other instruments.

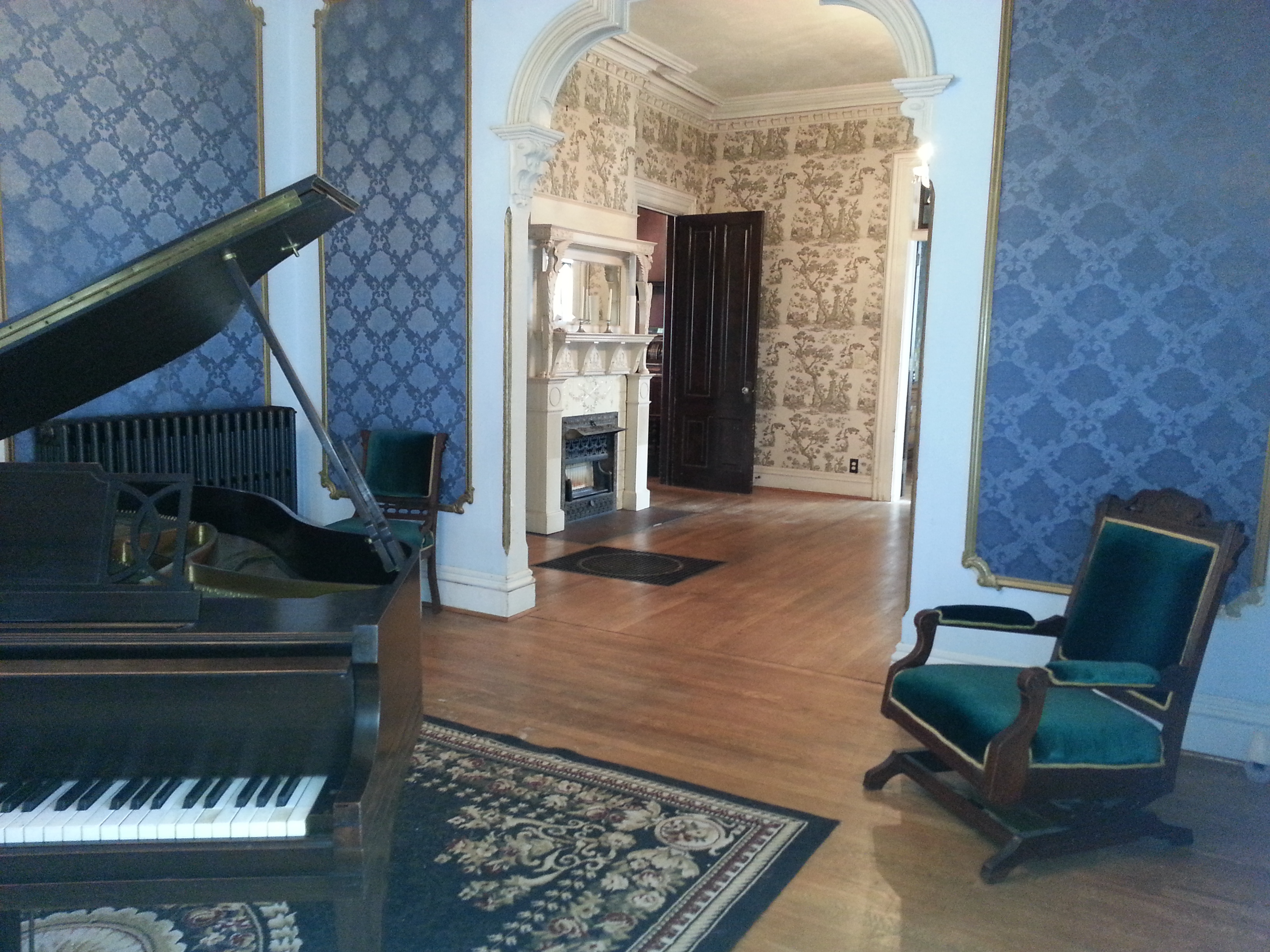
First parlor looking toward second parlor

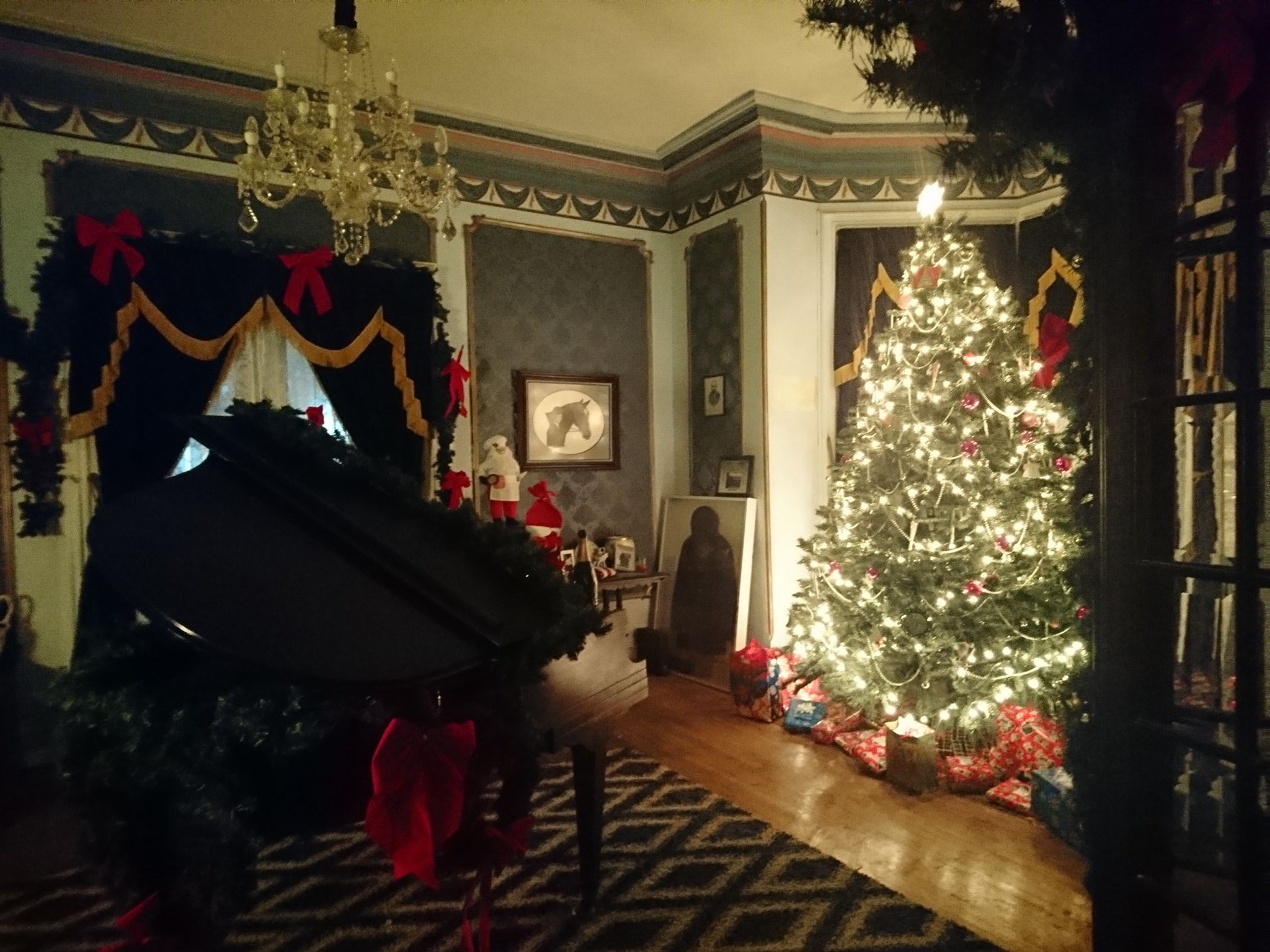
The Music Room at Christmas time

=== Library ===
The library/lounge room contains a 10-foot L-shaped bar, brick fireplace and built-in bookshelves.

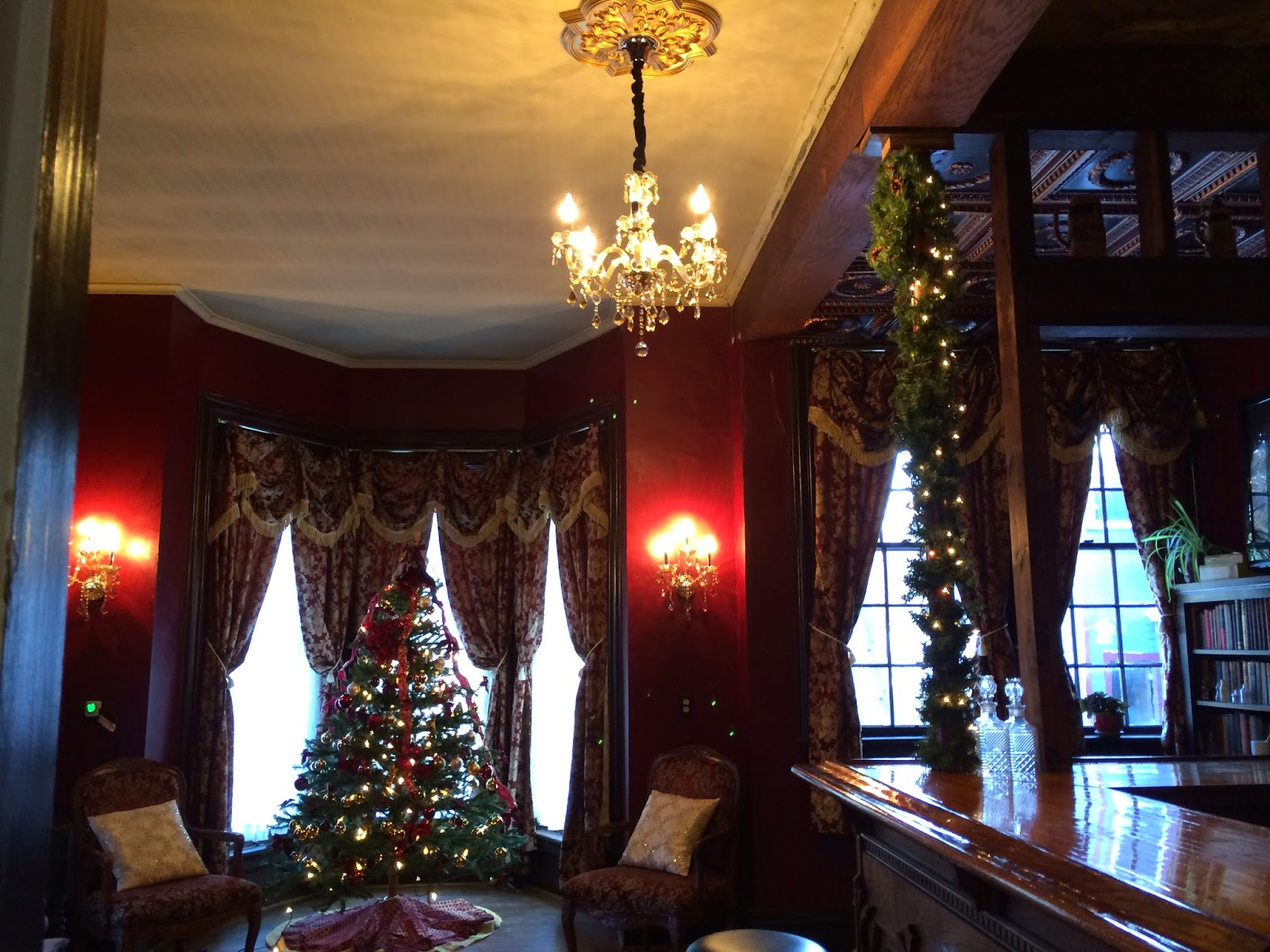
Library at Christmas time

=== Drawing Room ===
The second parlor, also known as the "drawing room" or "ladies salon" features white wallpaper depicting gnarled trees and fanciful scenes. It contains a large white tile fireplace and mantle straddled by ornately carved wooden griffons.

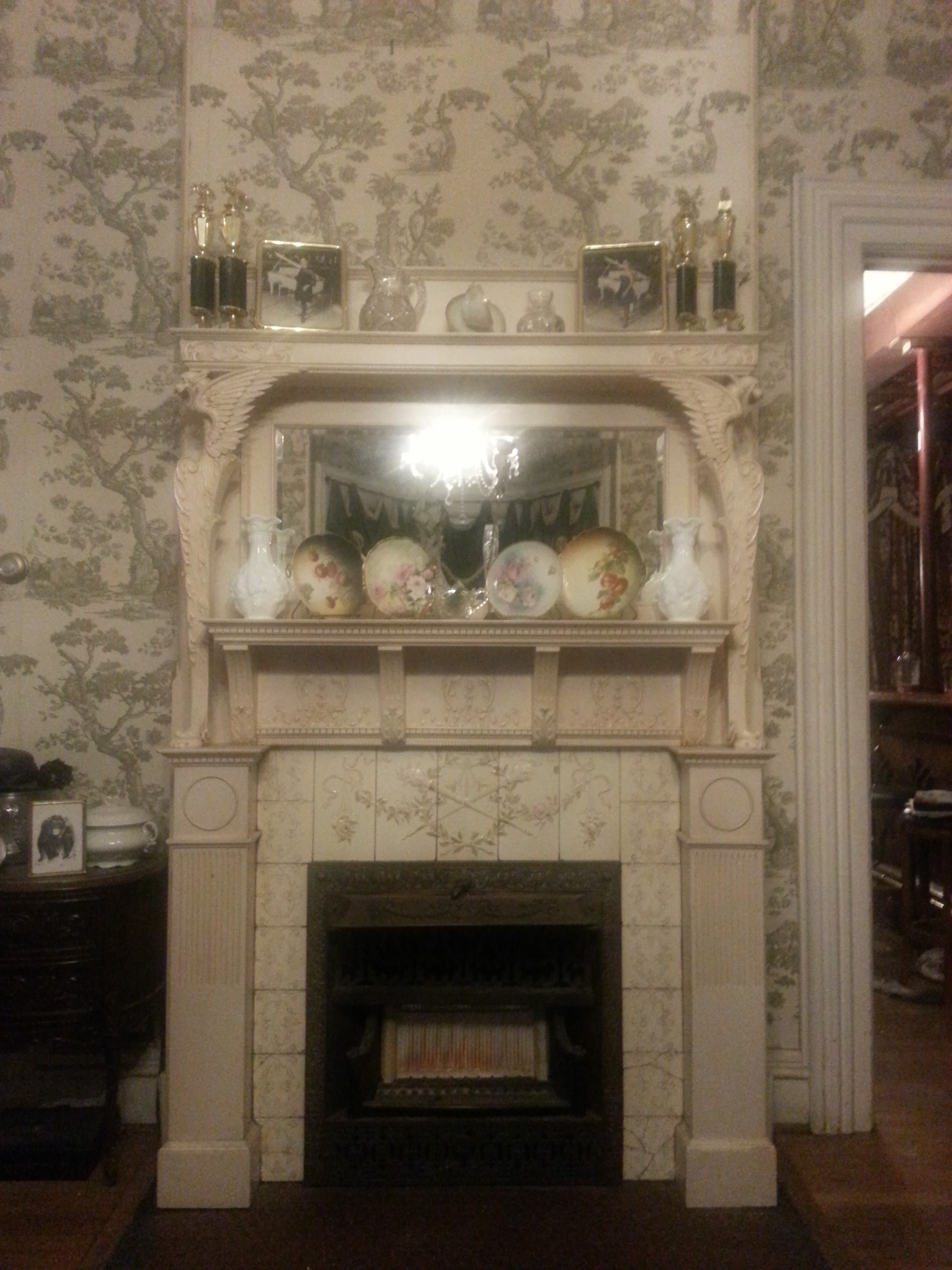
Drawing room fireplace

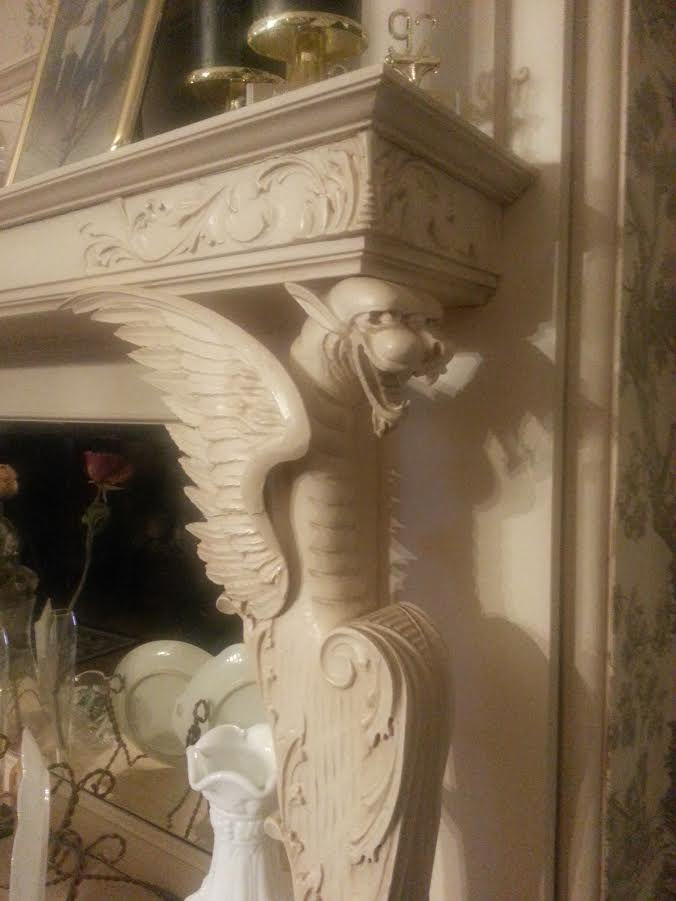
One of the two carved griffons

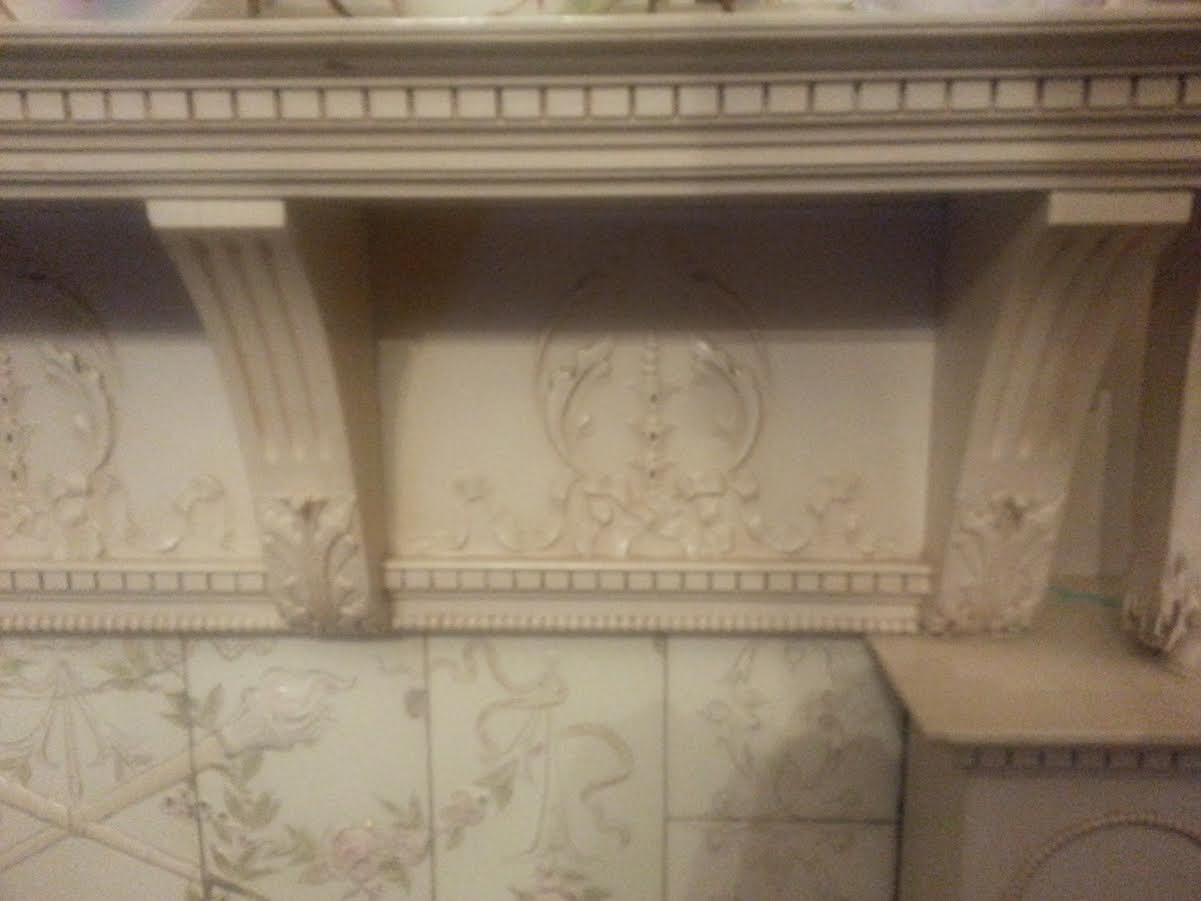
Drawing room fireplace detail

Below is a cache of images from the home listing when the home was last for sale in 2016. These images are how the house appeared at that time, and do not reflect more recent changes to the structure such as the remodeled kitchen surfaces and appliances and the painting of the main and rear staircases. These pictures also do not show the furniture and possessions of the new owners. These are included only for historical reference pertaining to the structure itself, for the purpose of eventually restoring the structure after the October 8, 2023 fire.

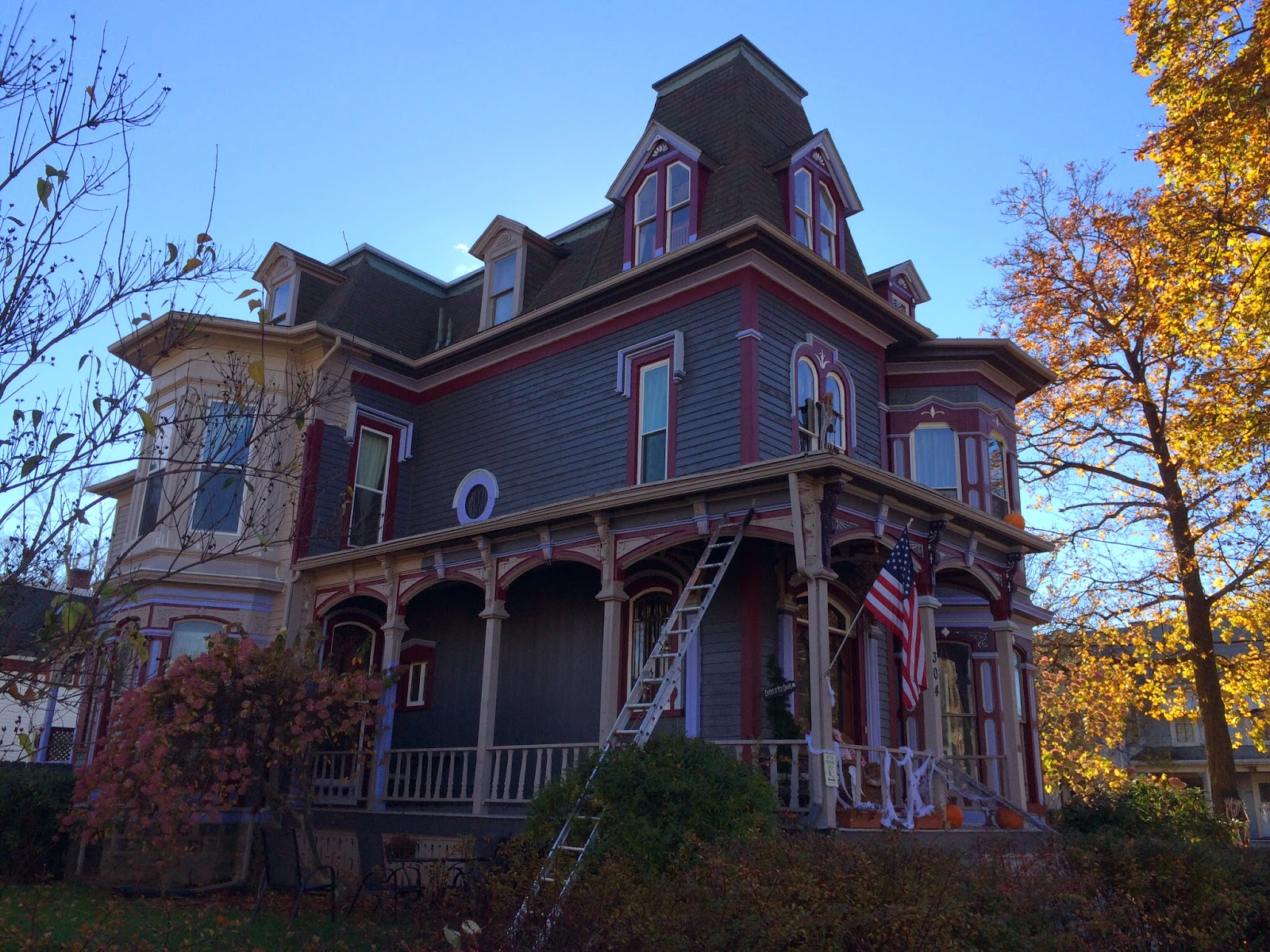
File:Conklin_Mountain_House_-_Northeast_Corner.jpg

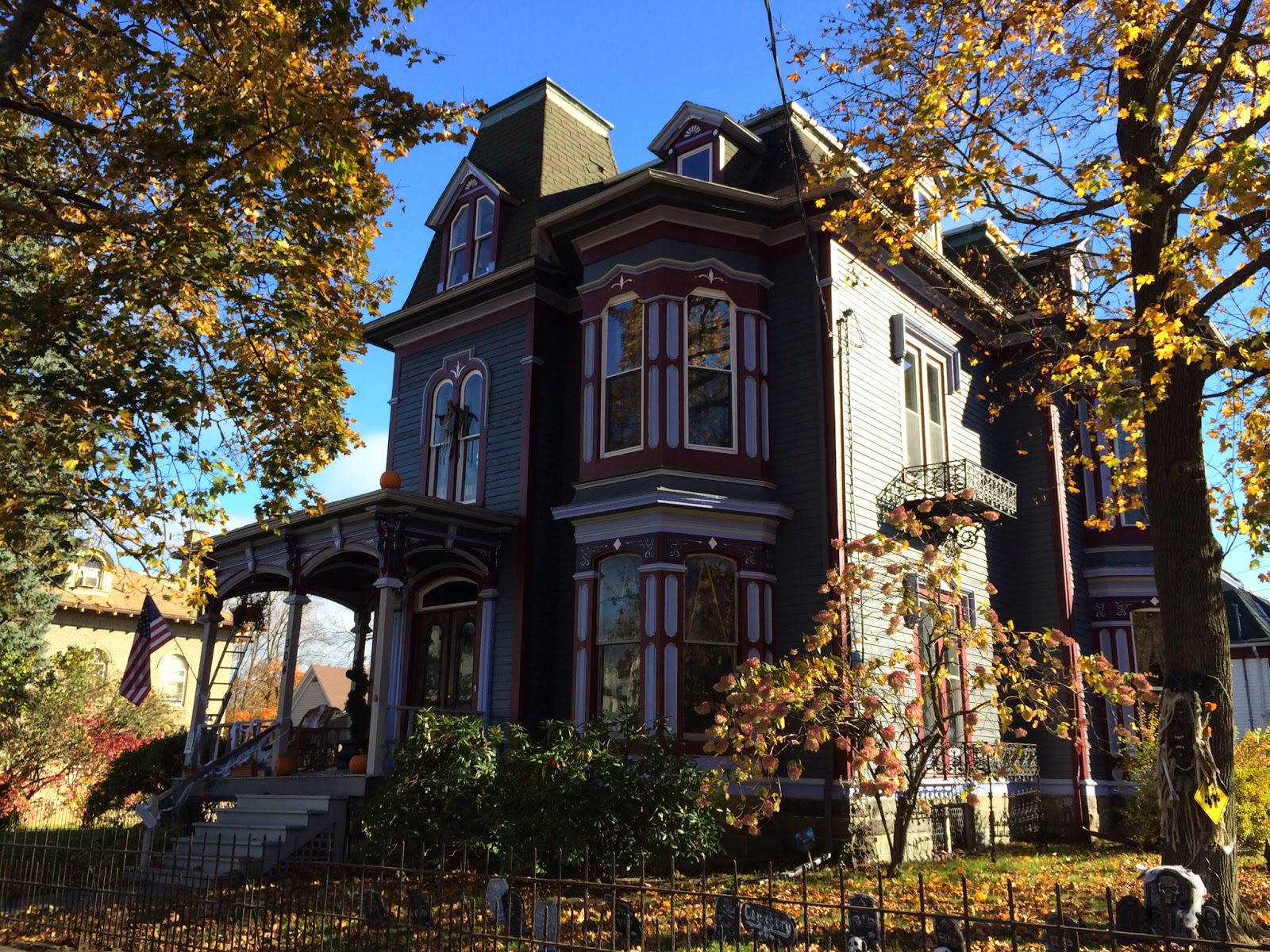
File:Conklin_Mountain_House_-_Northwest_Corner.jpg

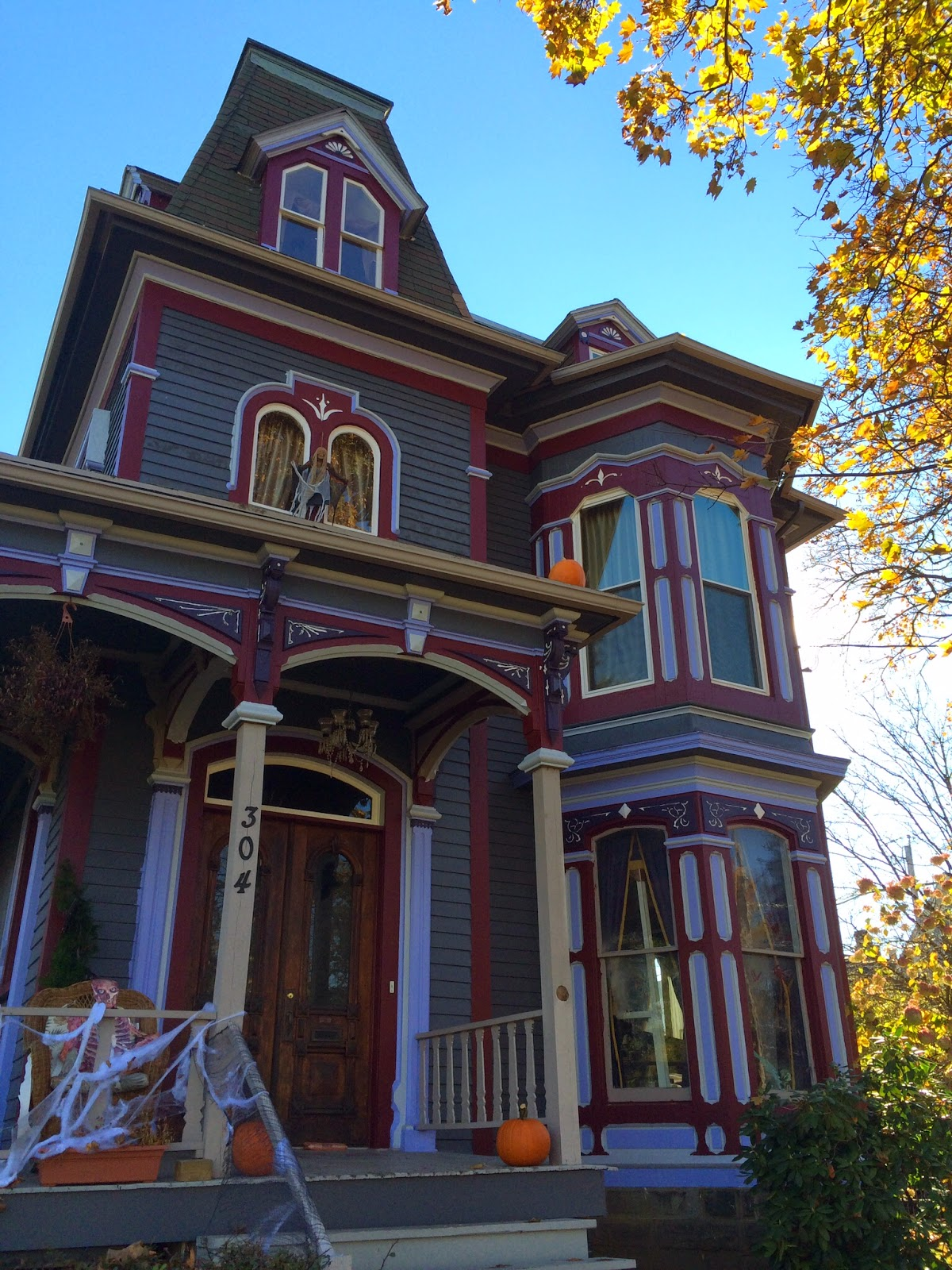
File:Conklin_Mountain_House_-_Front_Porch.jpg

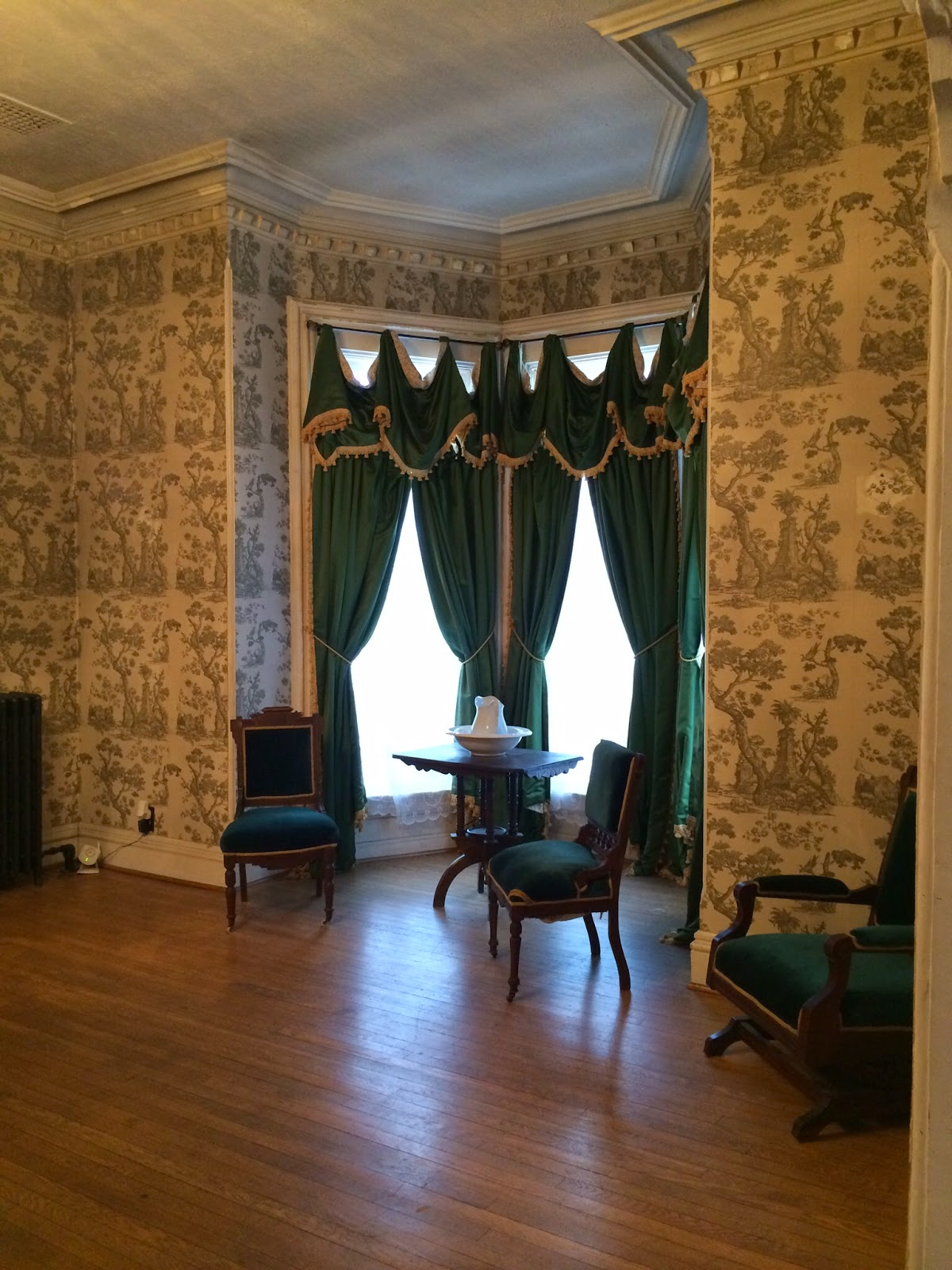
File:Conklin_Mountain_House_-_White_room_west_wall.jpg

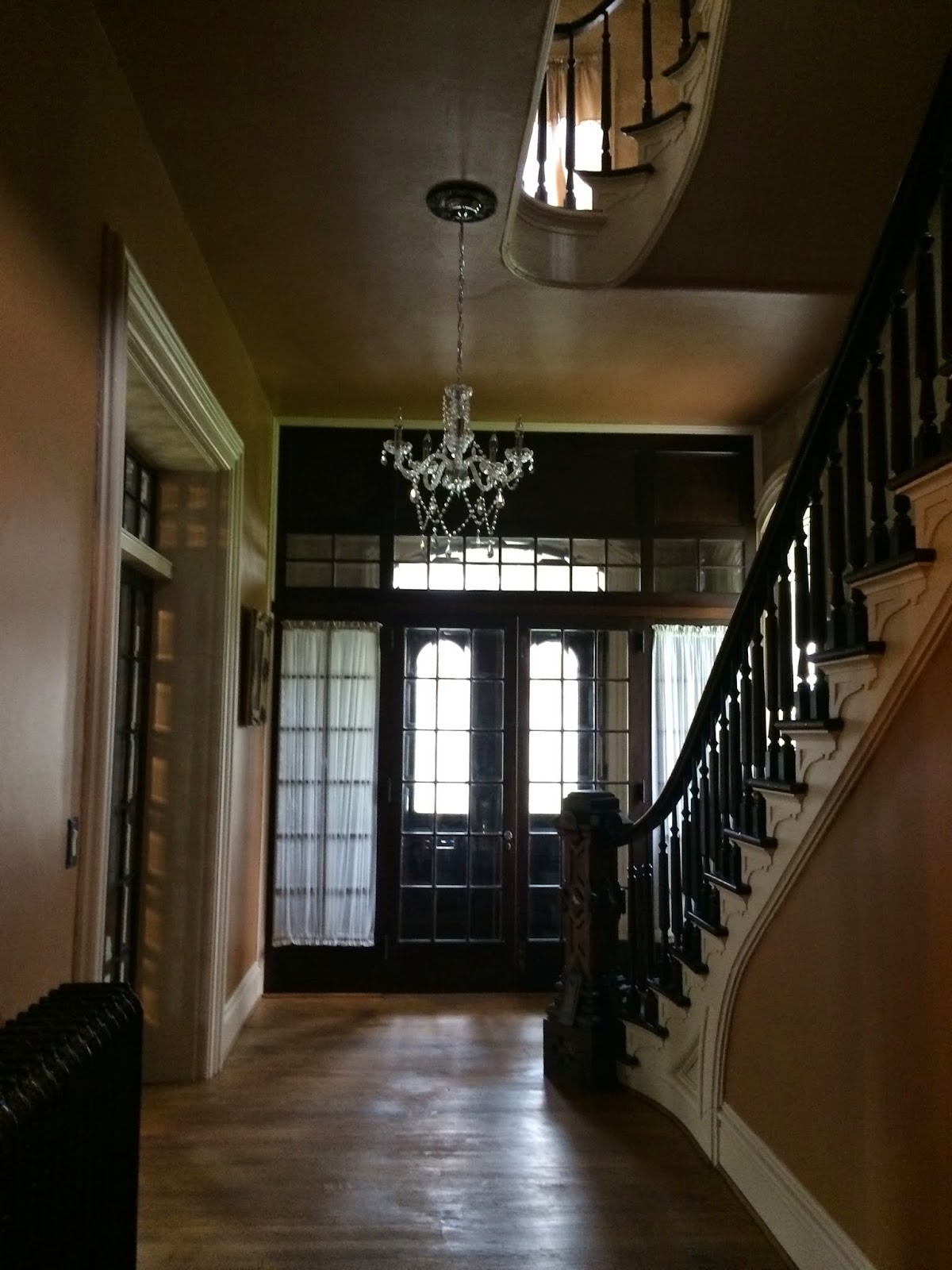
File:Conklin_Mountain_House_-_Foyer_2016.jpg

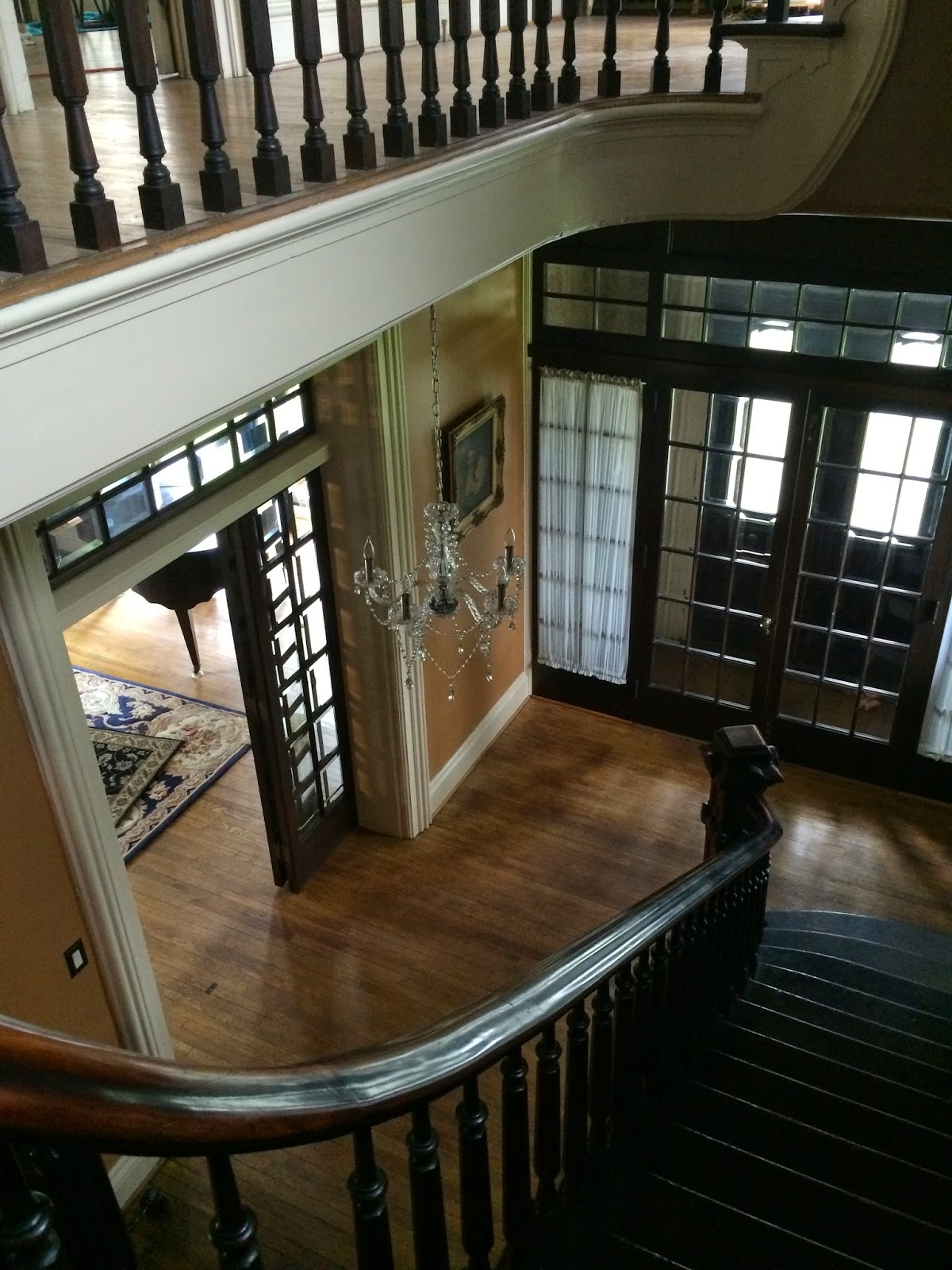
File:Conklin_Mountain_House_-_Foyer_From_Stairs.jpg

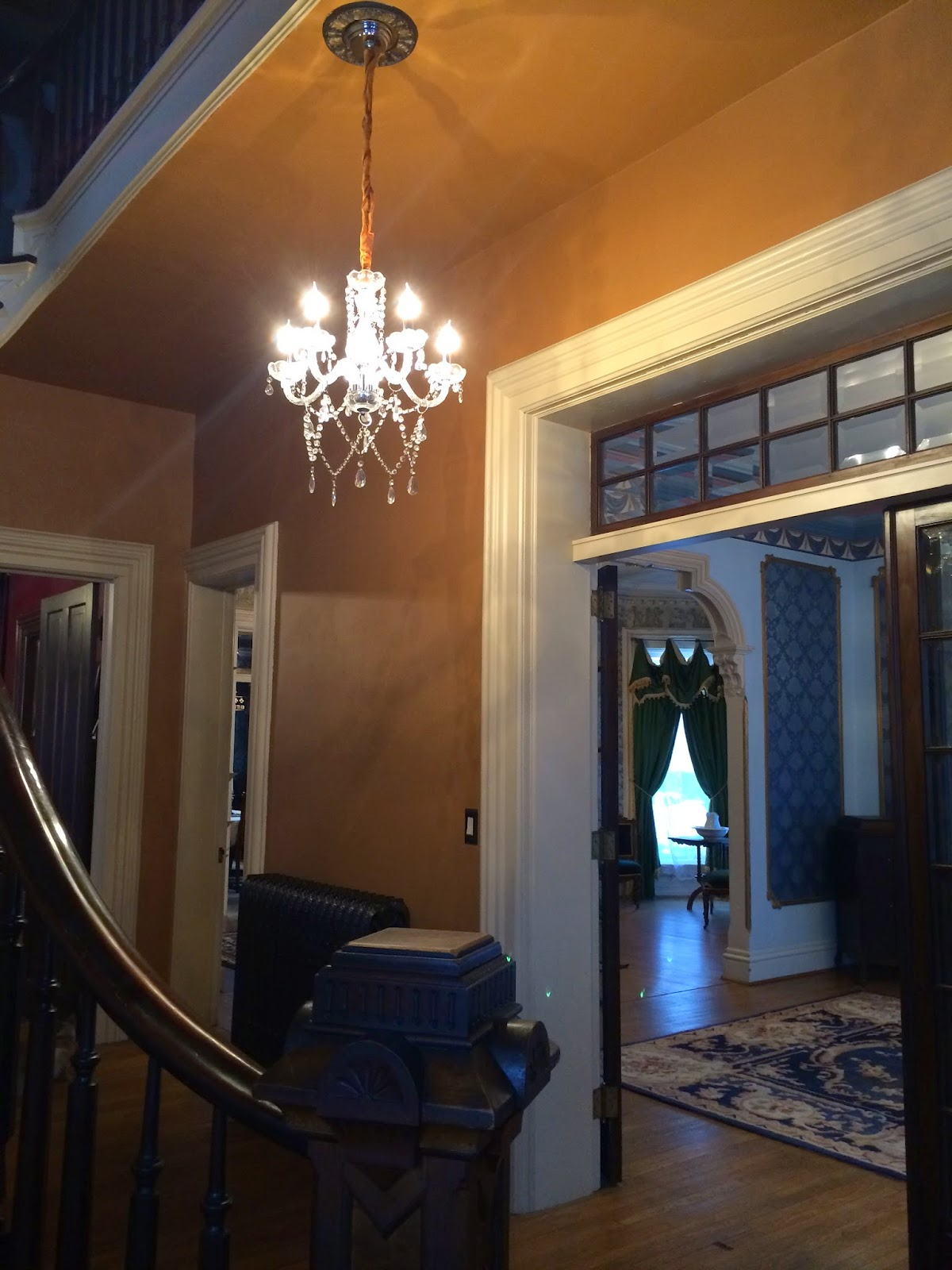
File:Conklin_Mountain_House_-_Foyer_to_Music_Room.jpg

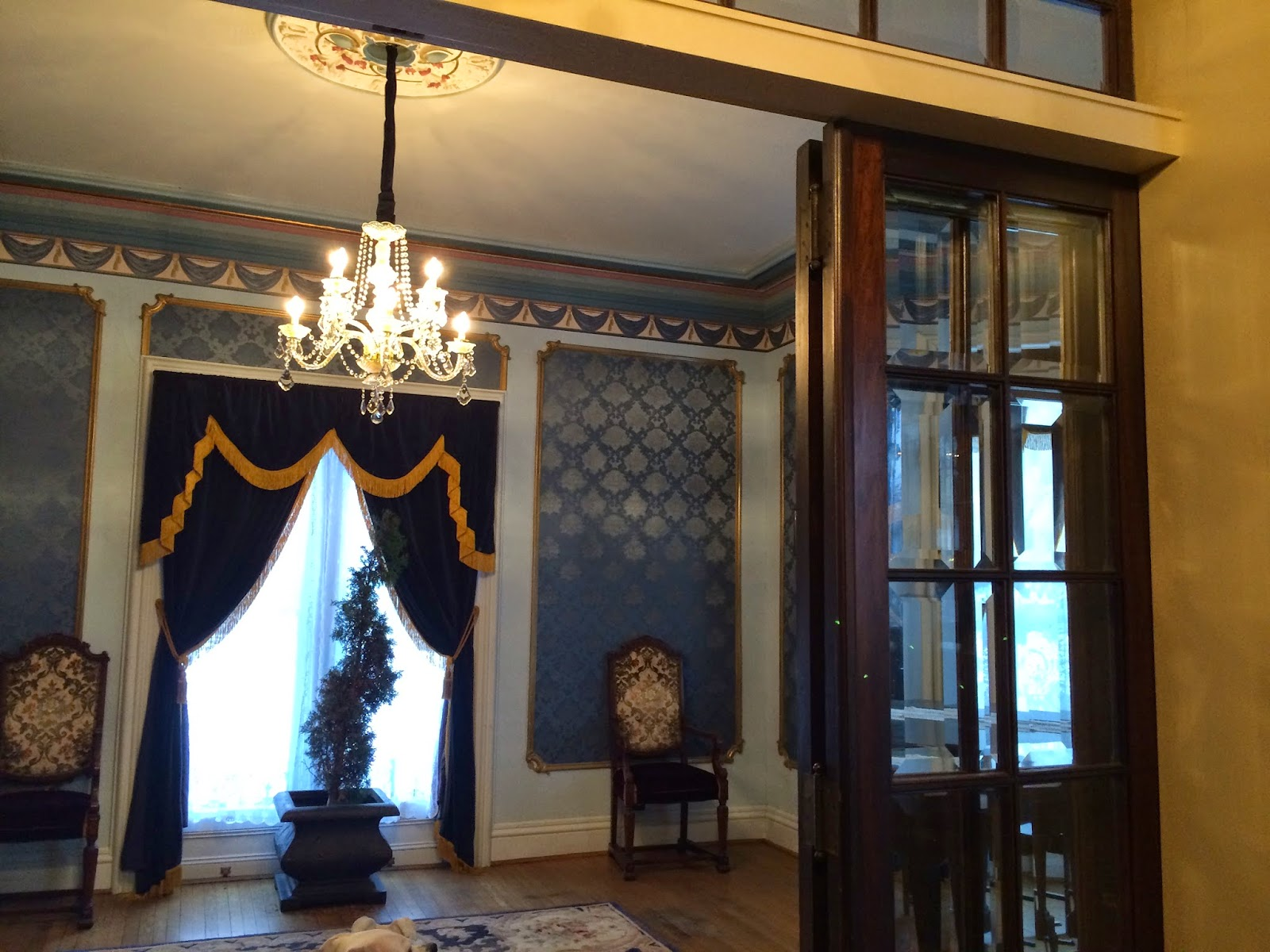
File:Conklin_Mountain_House_-_Blue_Room_2.jpg

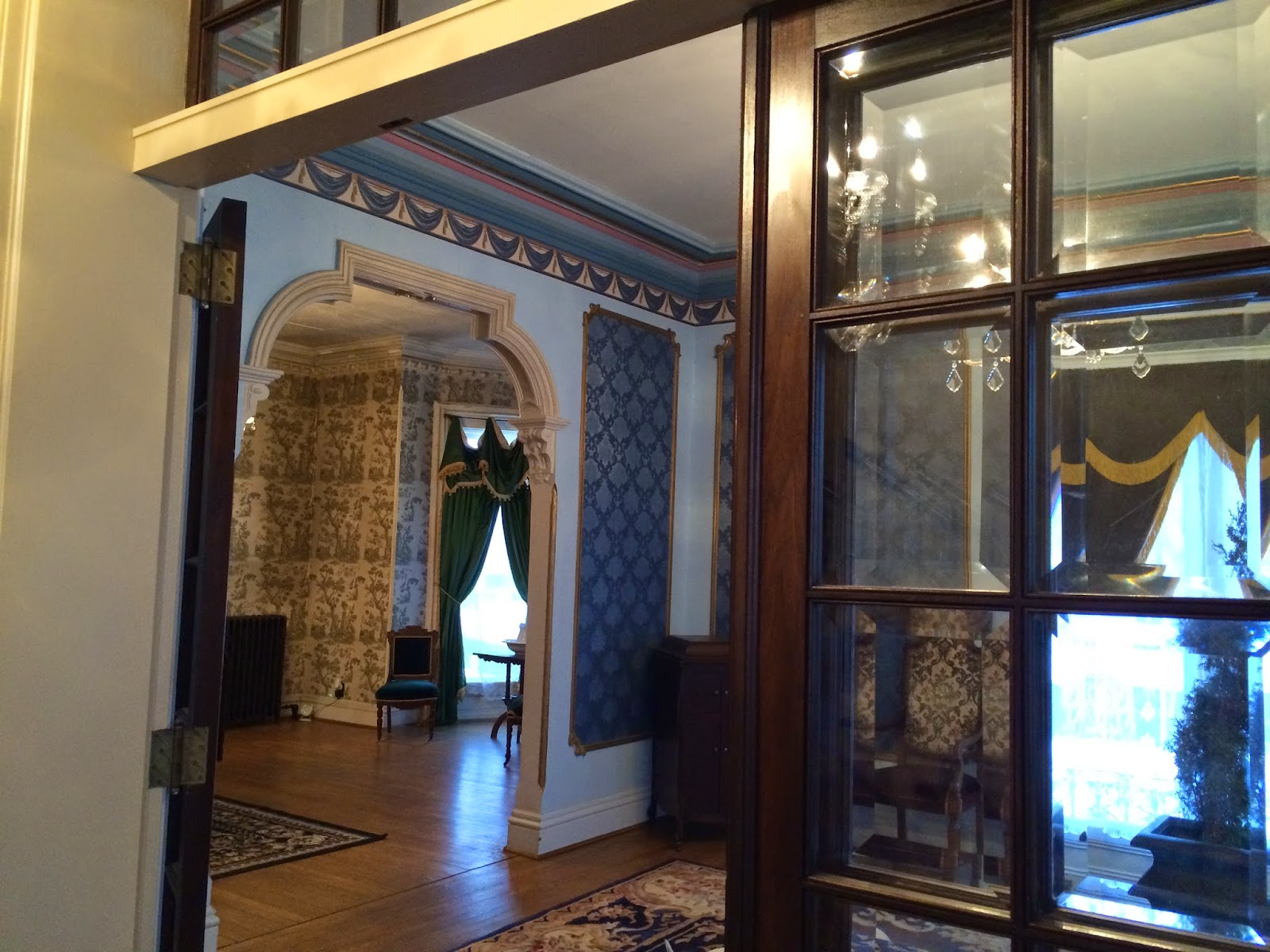
File:Conklin_Mountain_House_-_French_Door_Foyer.jpg

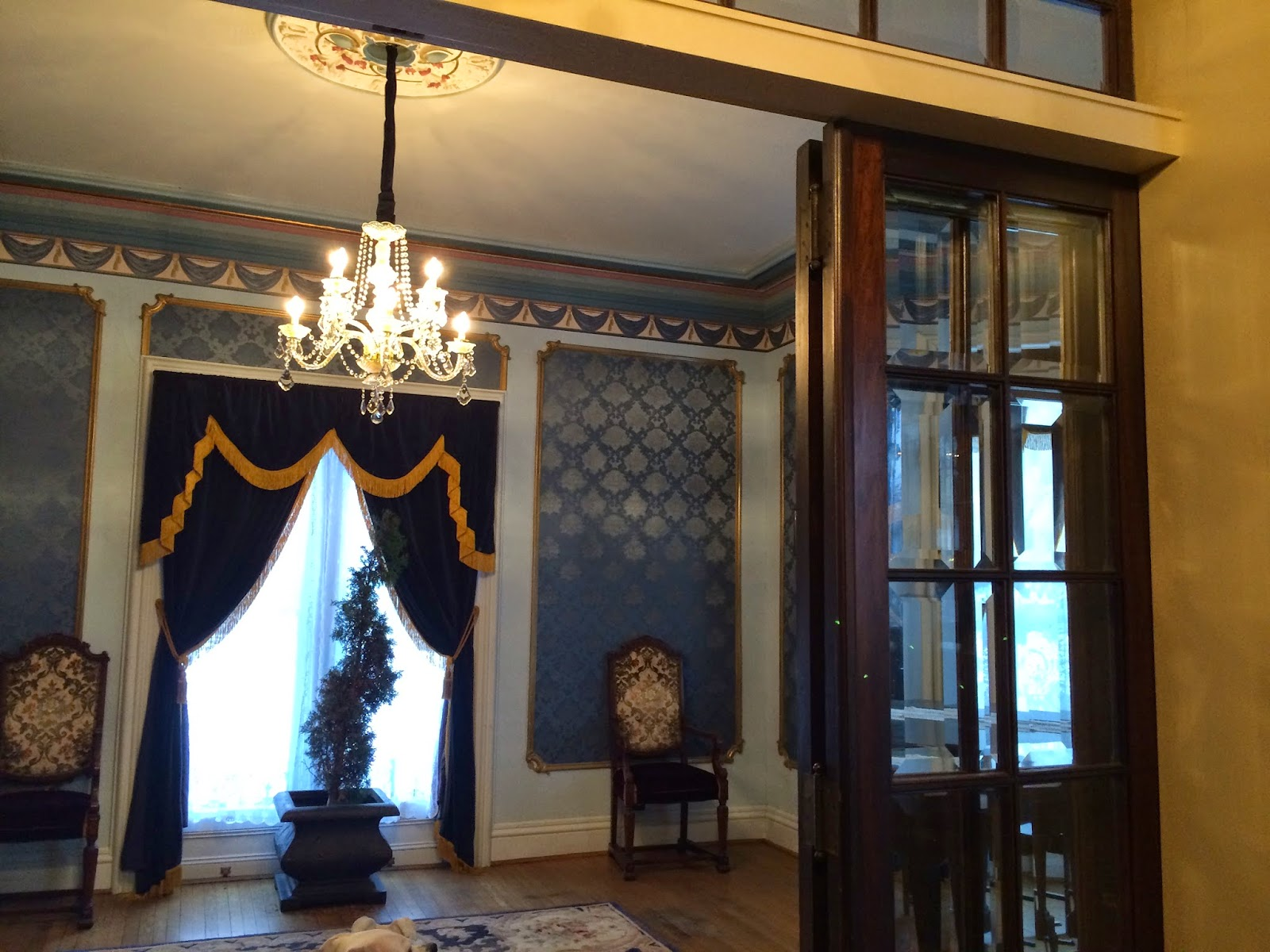
File:Conklin_Mountain_House_-_Blue_Room_2.jpg

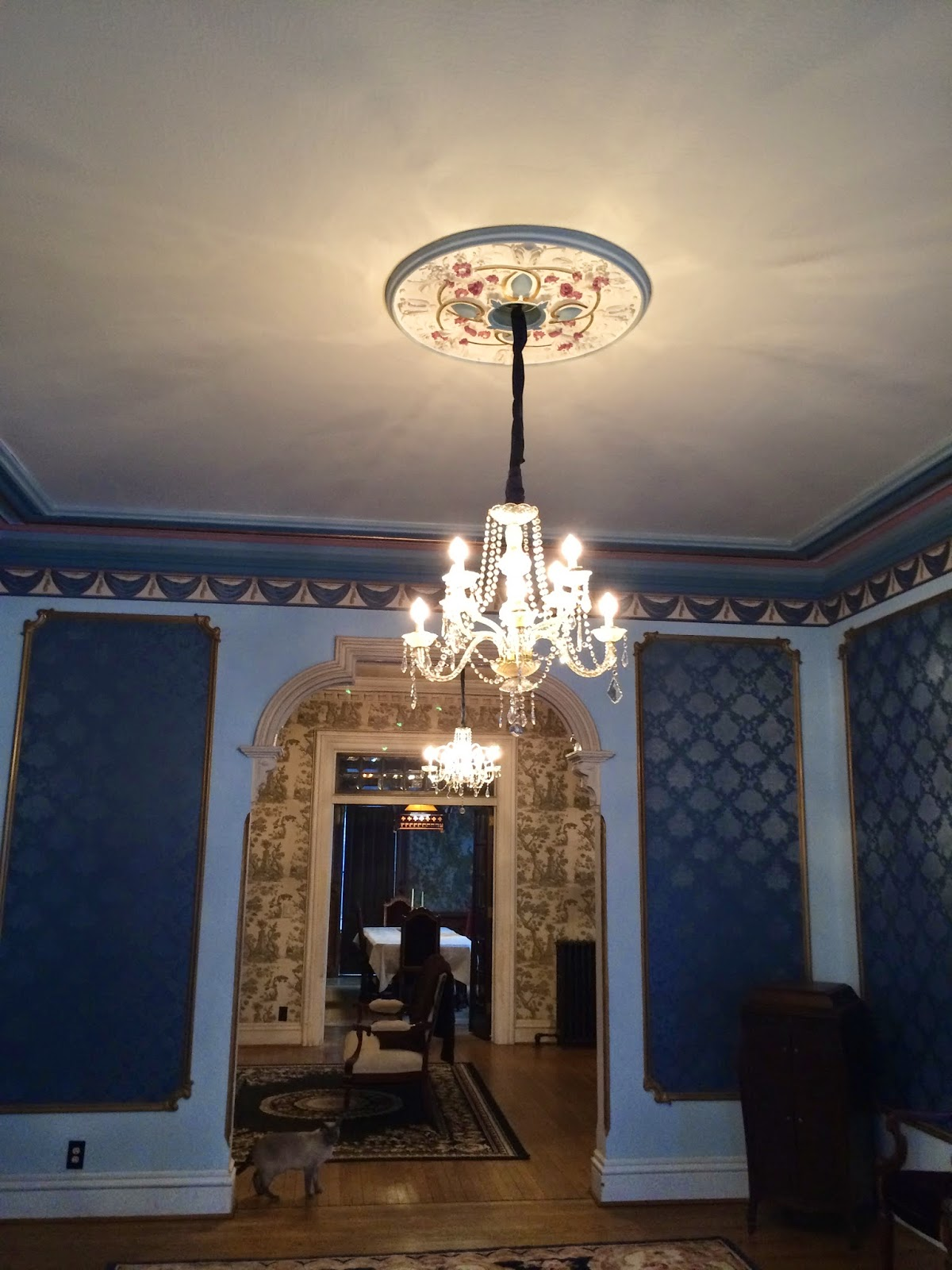
File:Conklin_Mountain_House_-_Blue_to_White.jpg

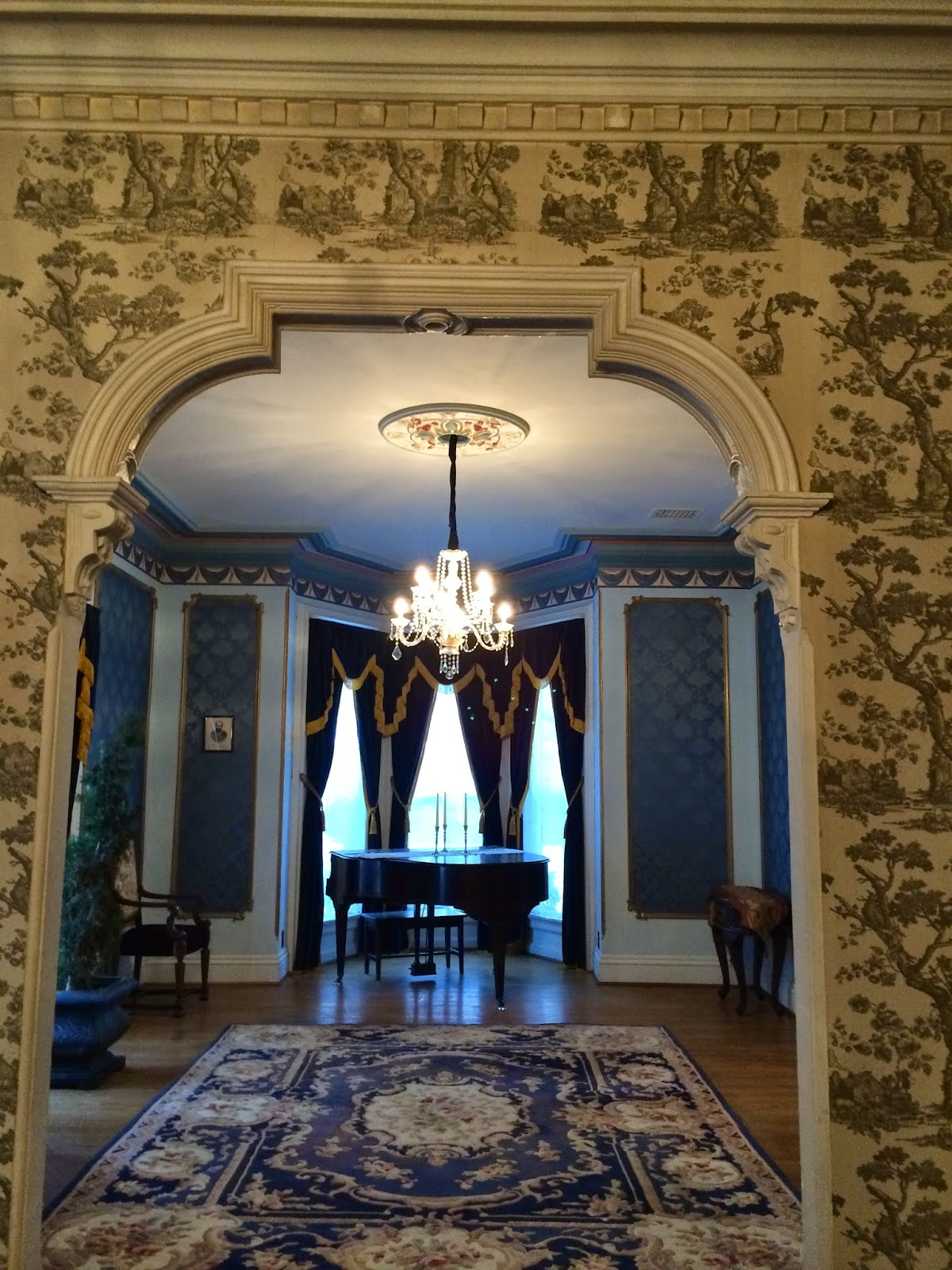
File:Conklin_Mountain_House_-_White_to_blue.jpg

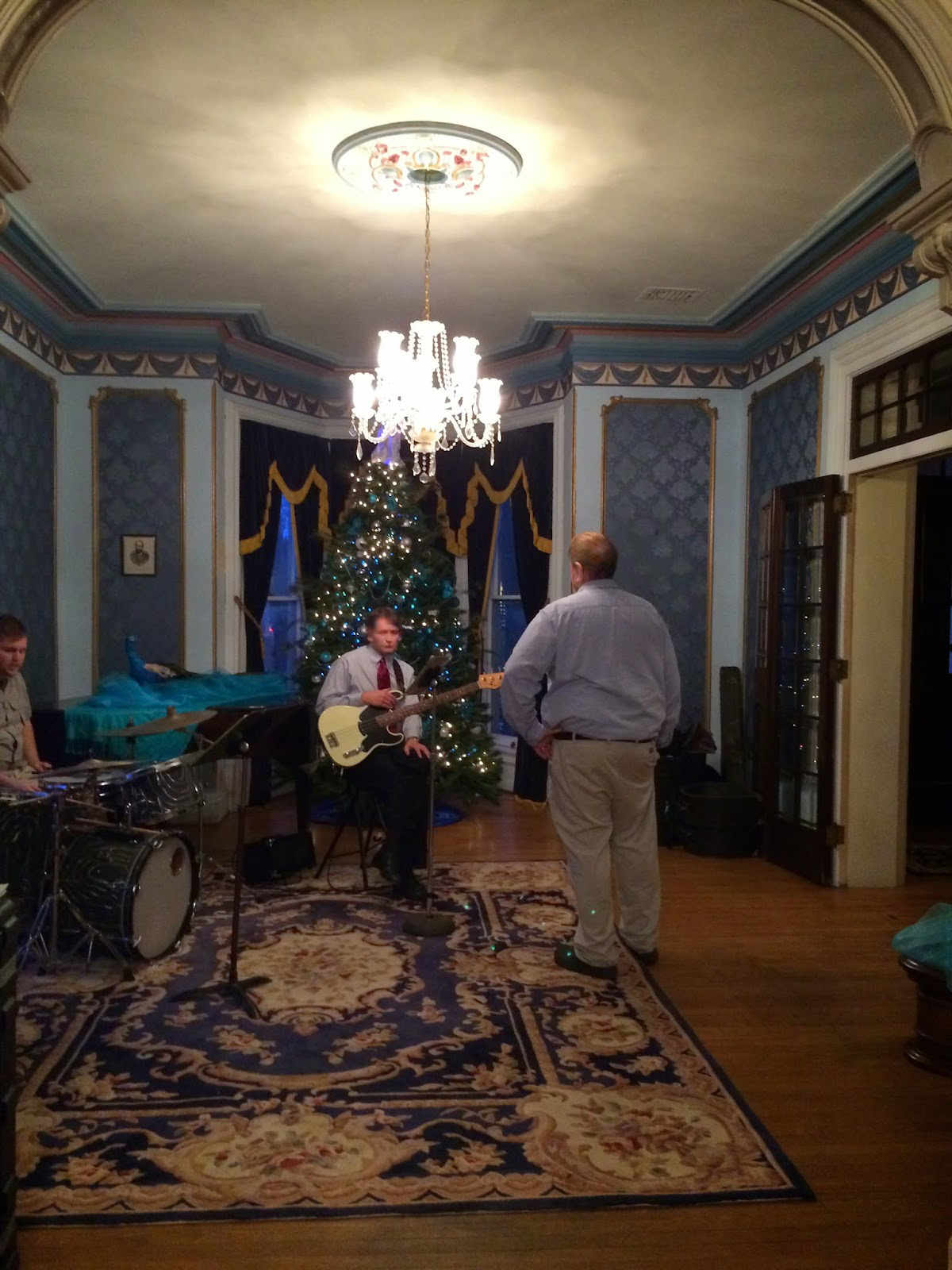
File:Conklin_Mountain_House_-_Blue_Room_Overview.jpg
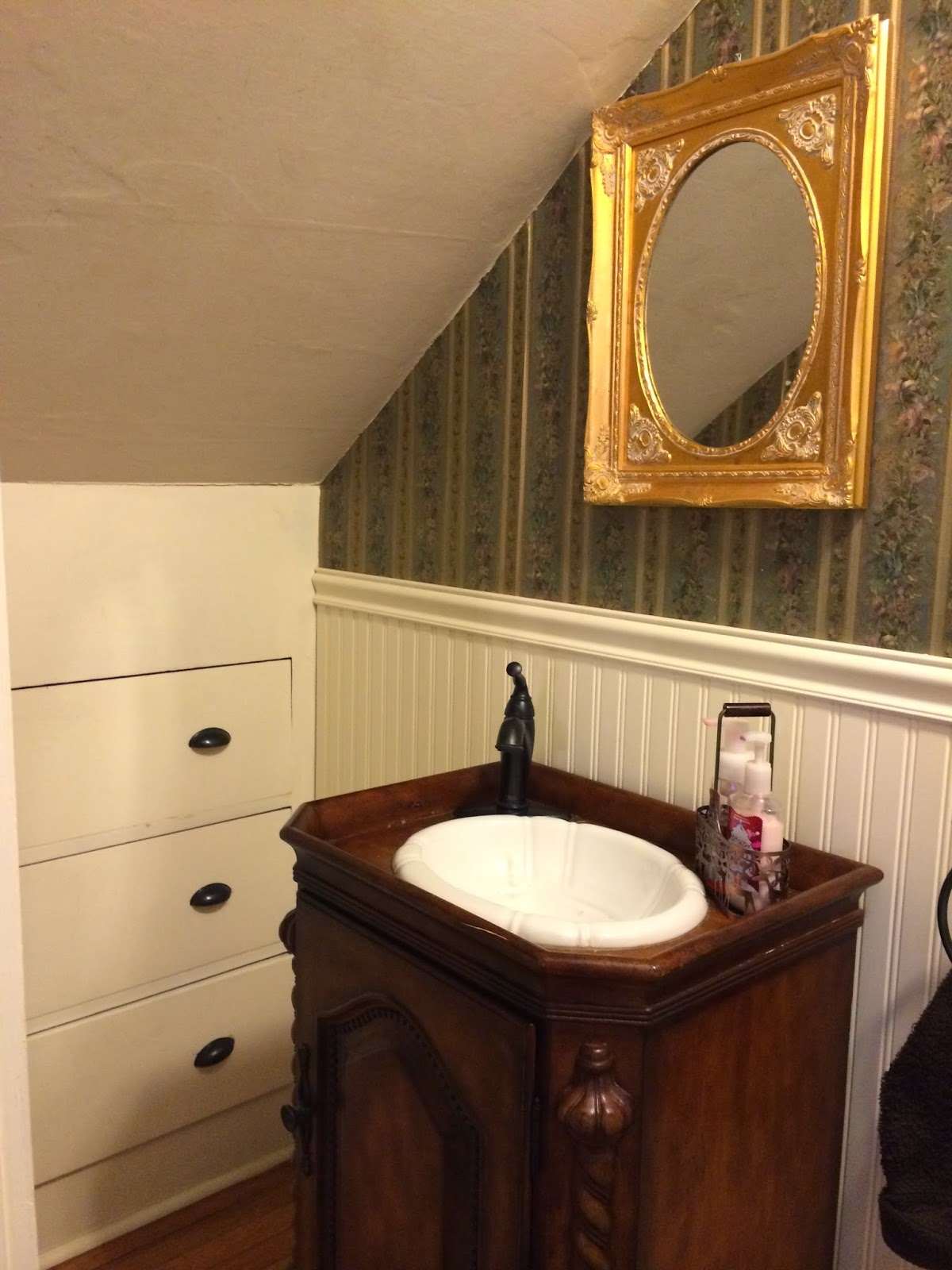
File:Conklin_Mountain_House_-_First_Floor_Half_Batch.jpg

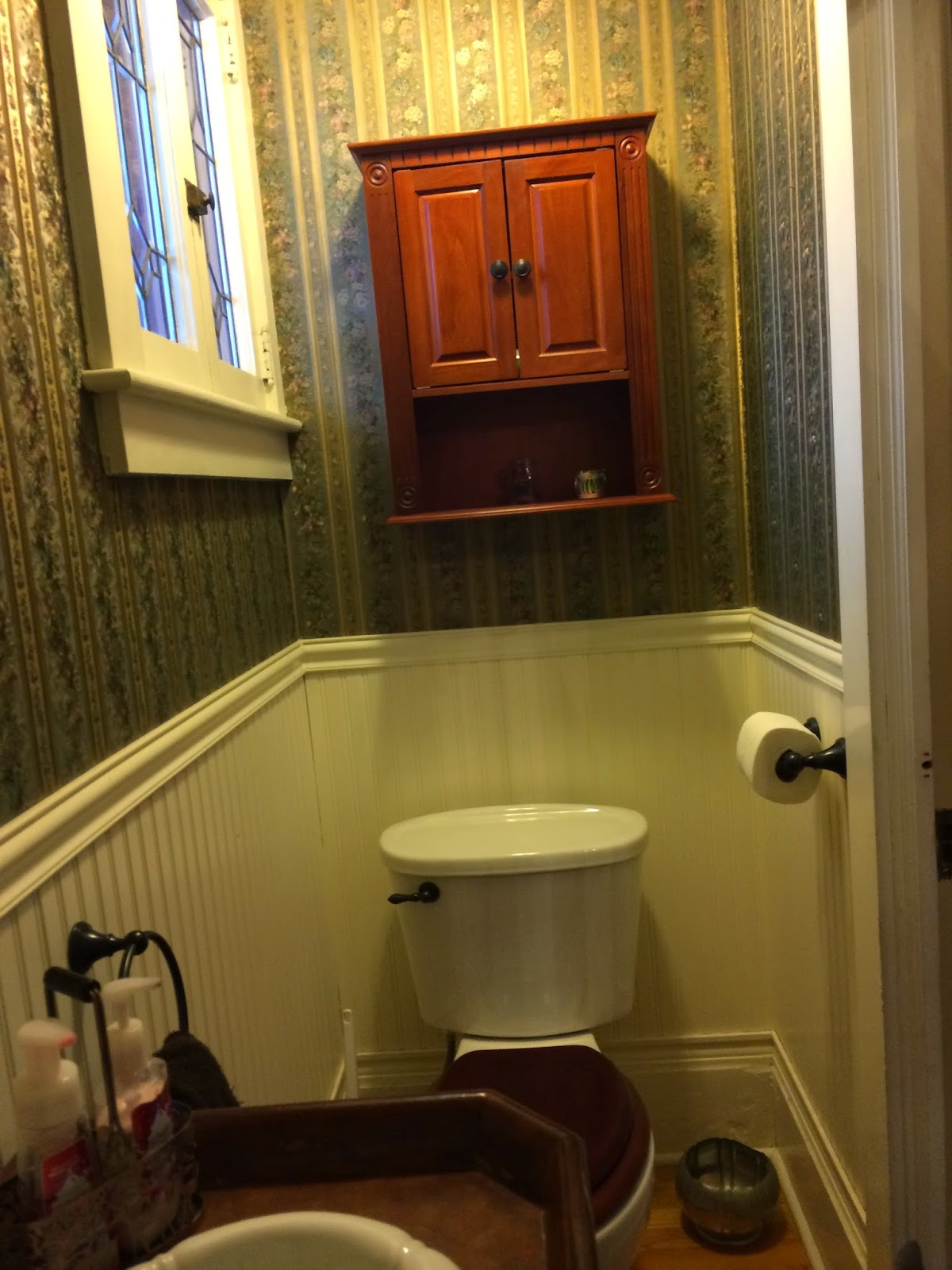
File:Conklin_Mountain_House_-_First_Floor_Half_Bathroom.jpg

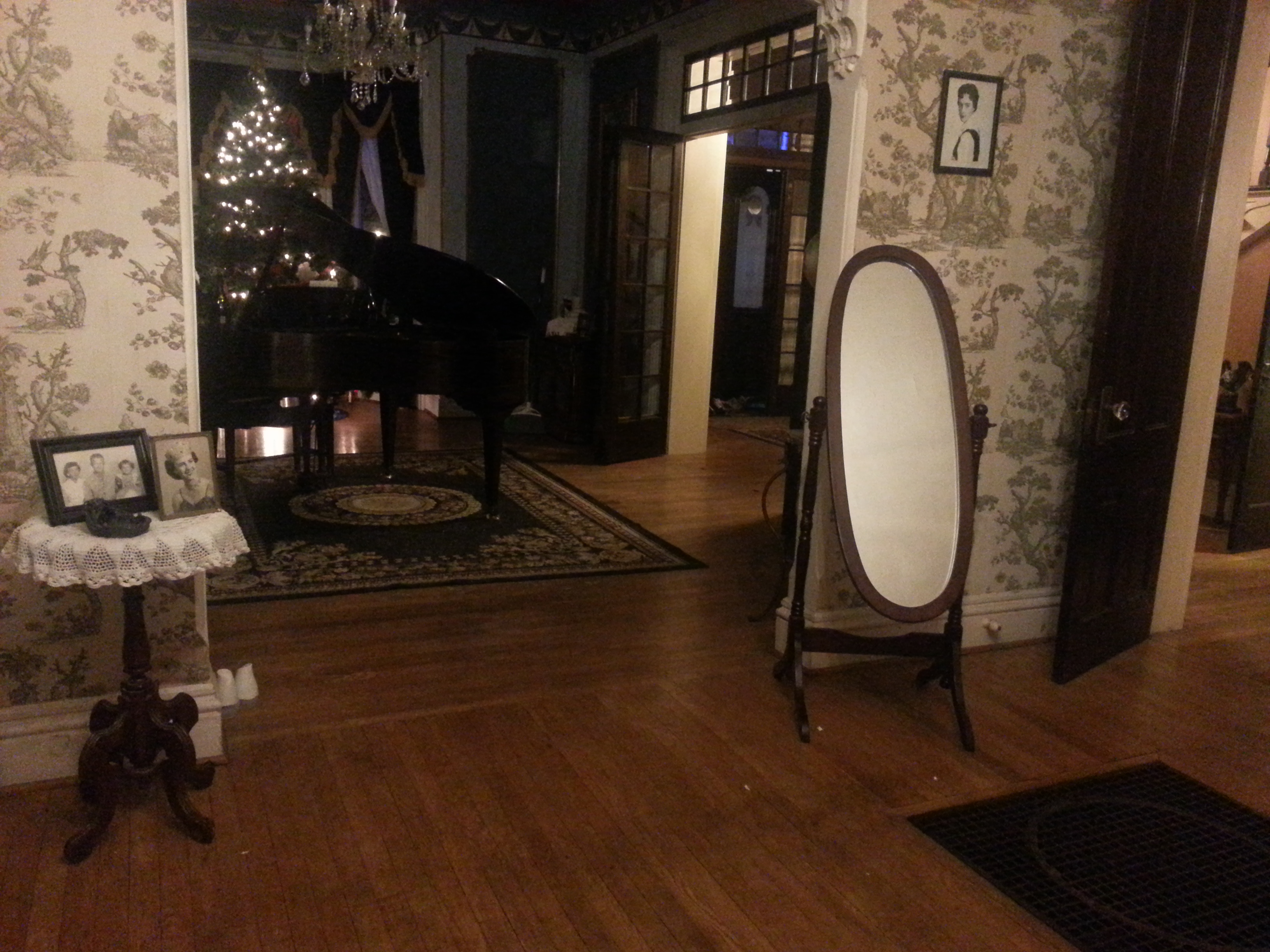
File:Conklin_Mountain_House_Ladies_Salon_to_Music_Room_View_December_2016.jpg

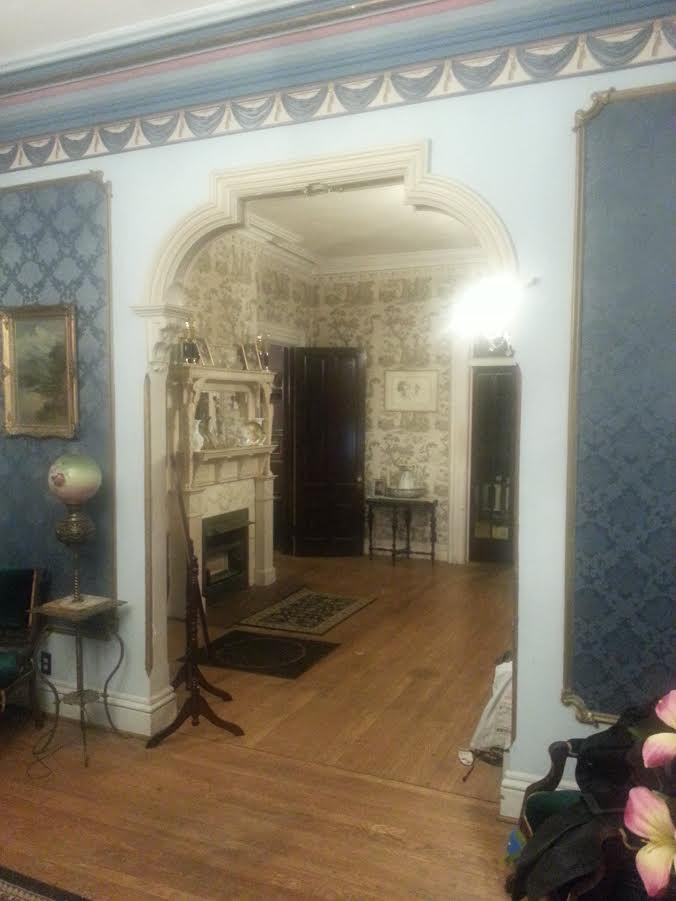
File:Conklin_Mountain_House_Music_To_Salon.jpg

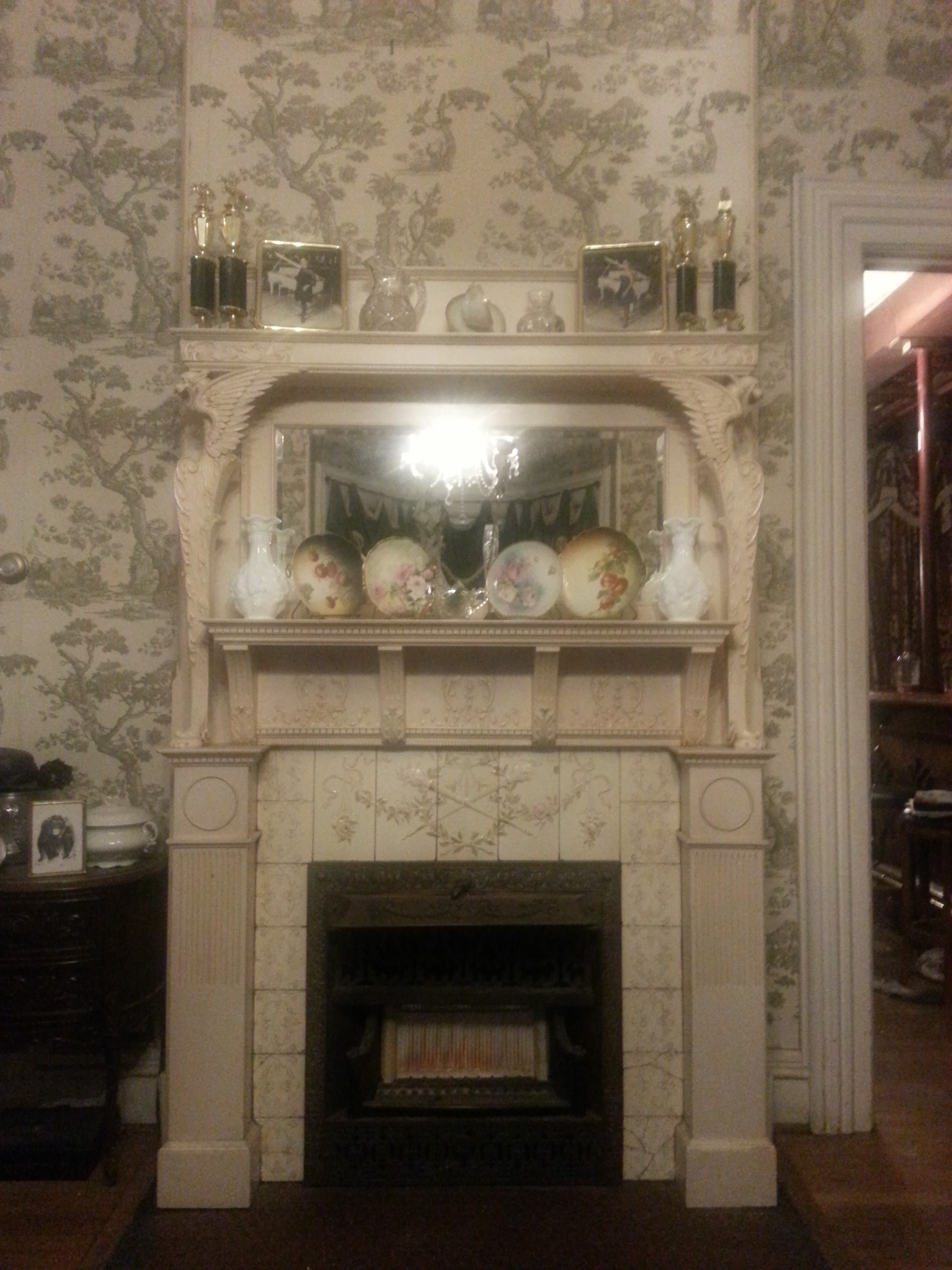
File:Conklin_Mountain_House_Salon_FP.jpg

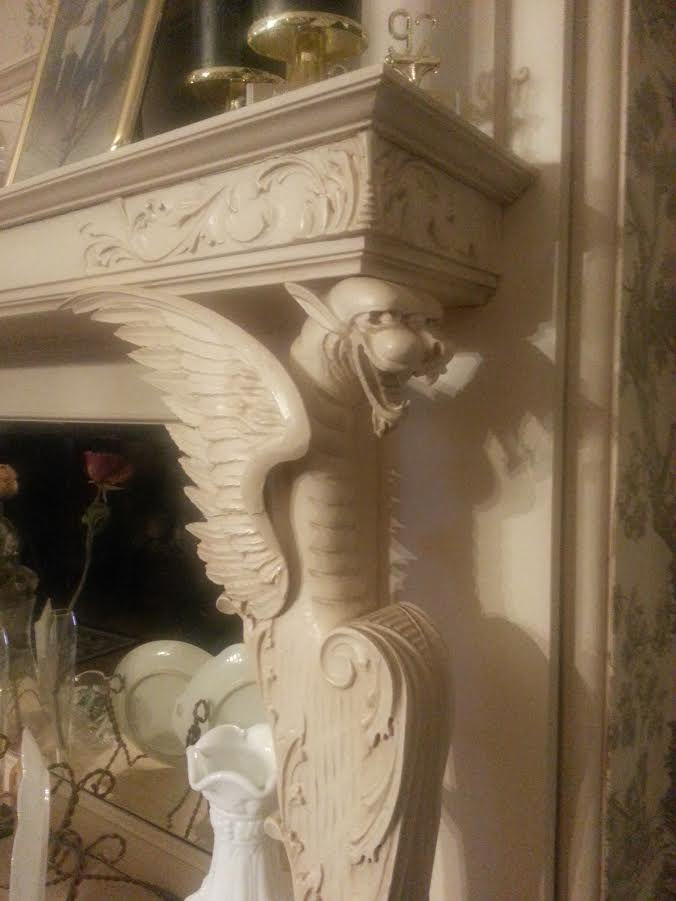
File:Conklin_Mountain_House_Salon_FP_Detail2.jpg

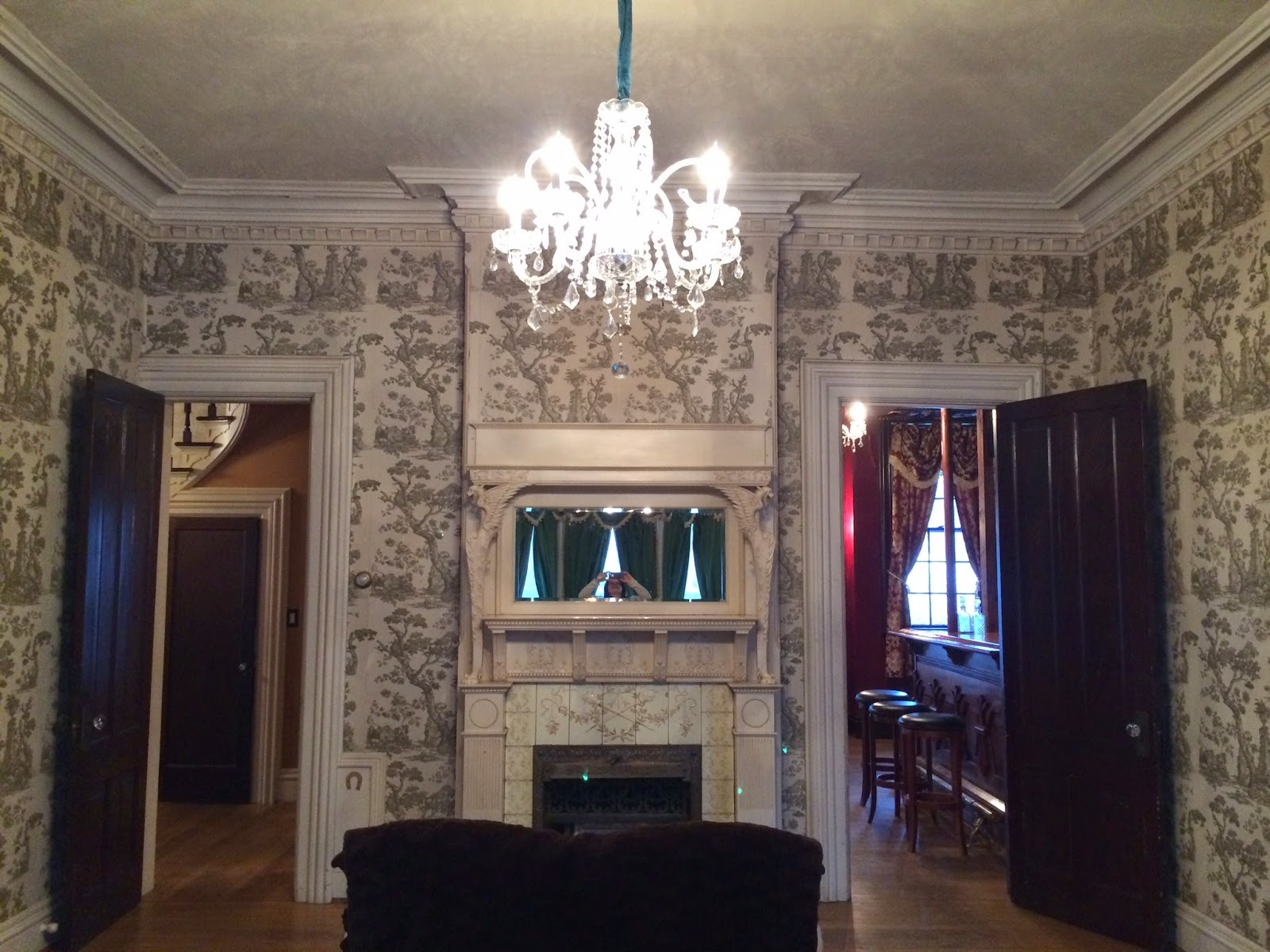
File:Conklin_Mountain_House_-_White_Room_Fireplace.jpg

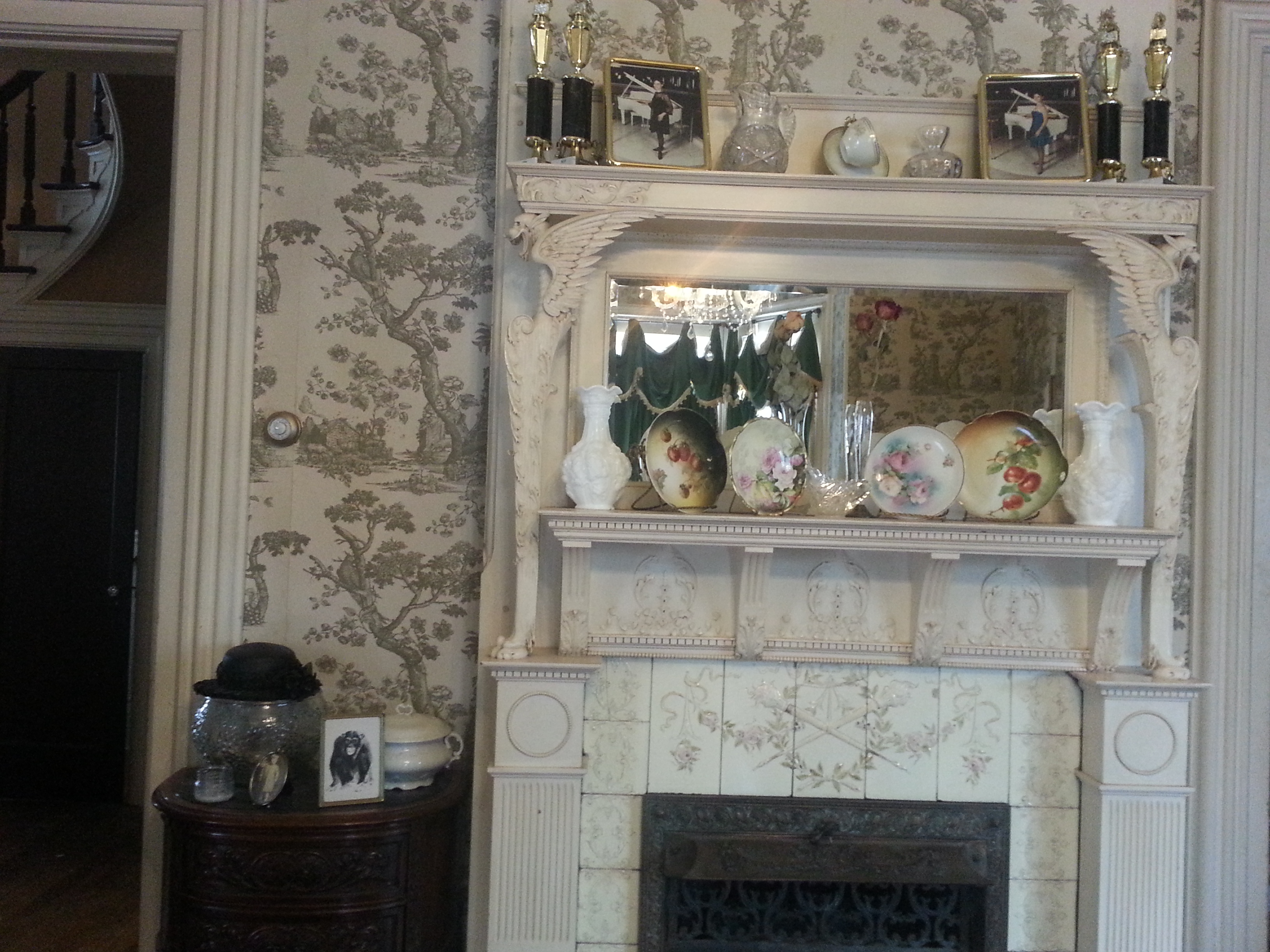
File:Conklin_Mountain_House_Ladies_Salon_Fireplace_Mantle_April_2017.jpg

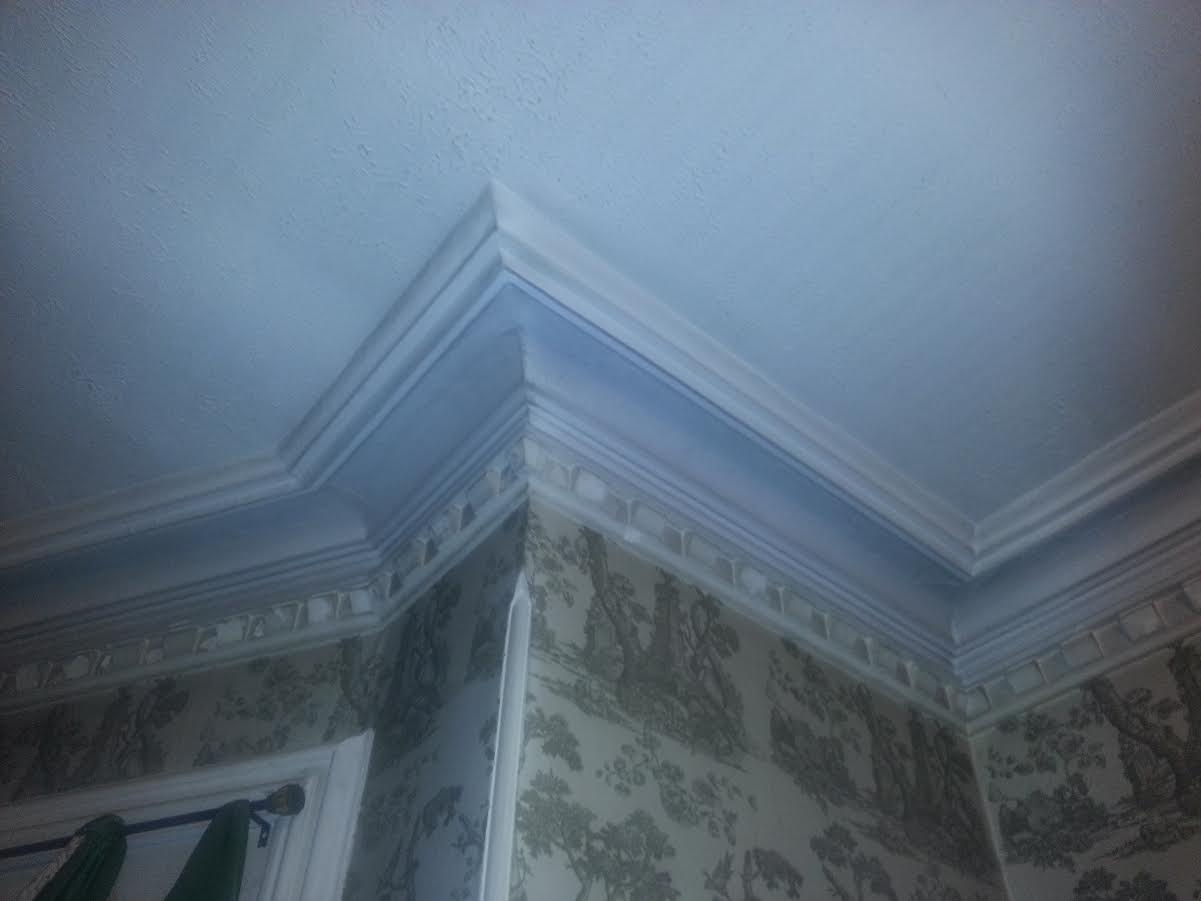
File:Conklin_Mountain_House_Salon_Detail.jpg

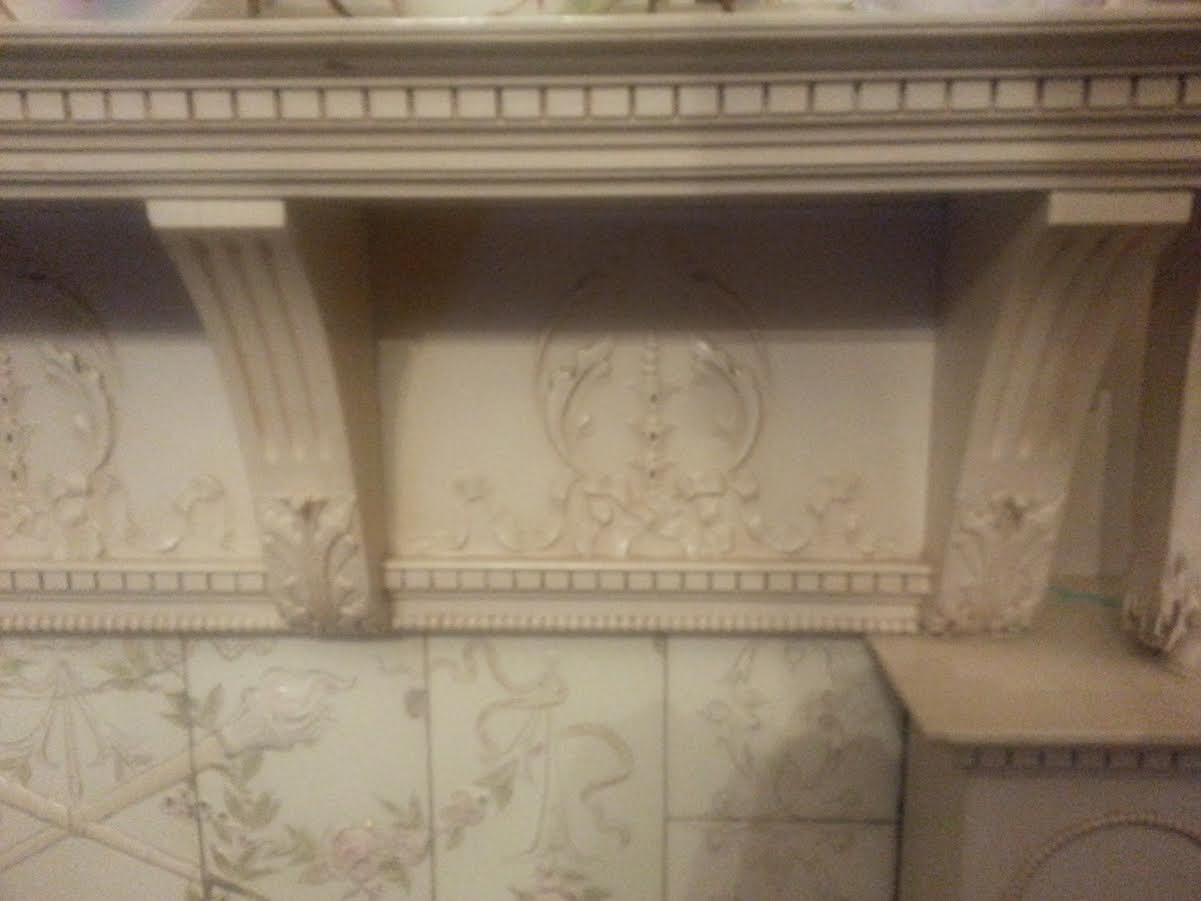
File:Conklin_Mountain_House_Salon_FP_Detail.jpg

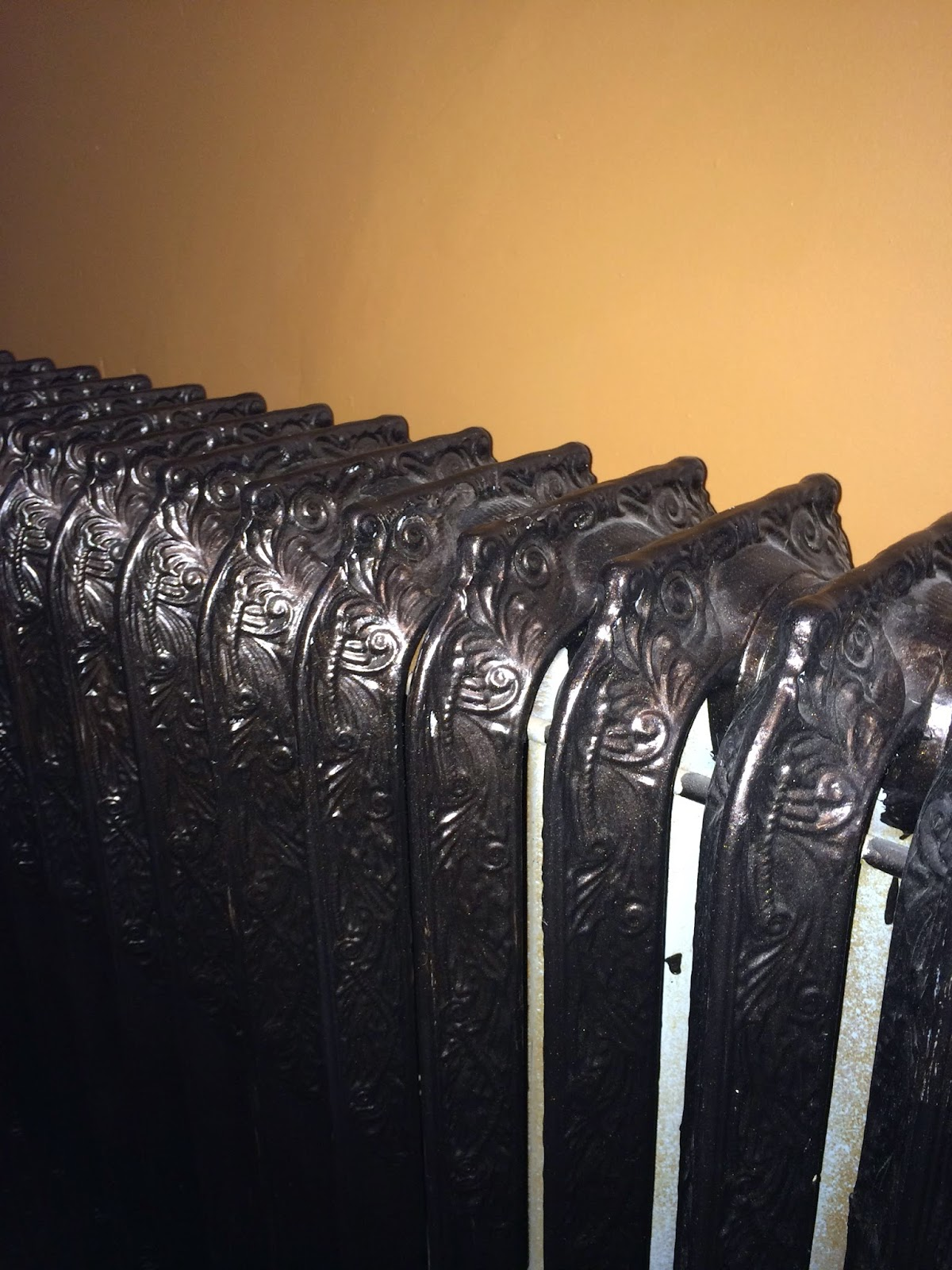
File:Conklin_Mountain_House_-_radiator_detail.jpg

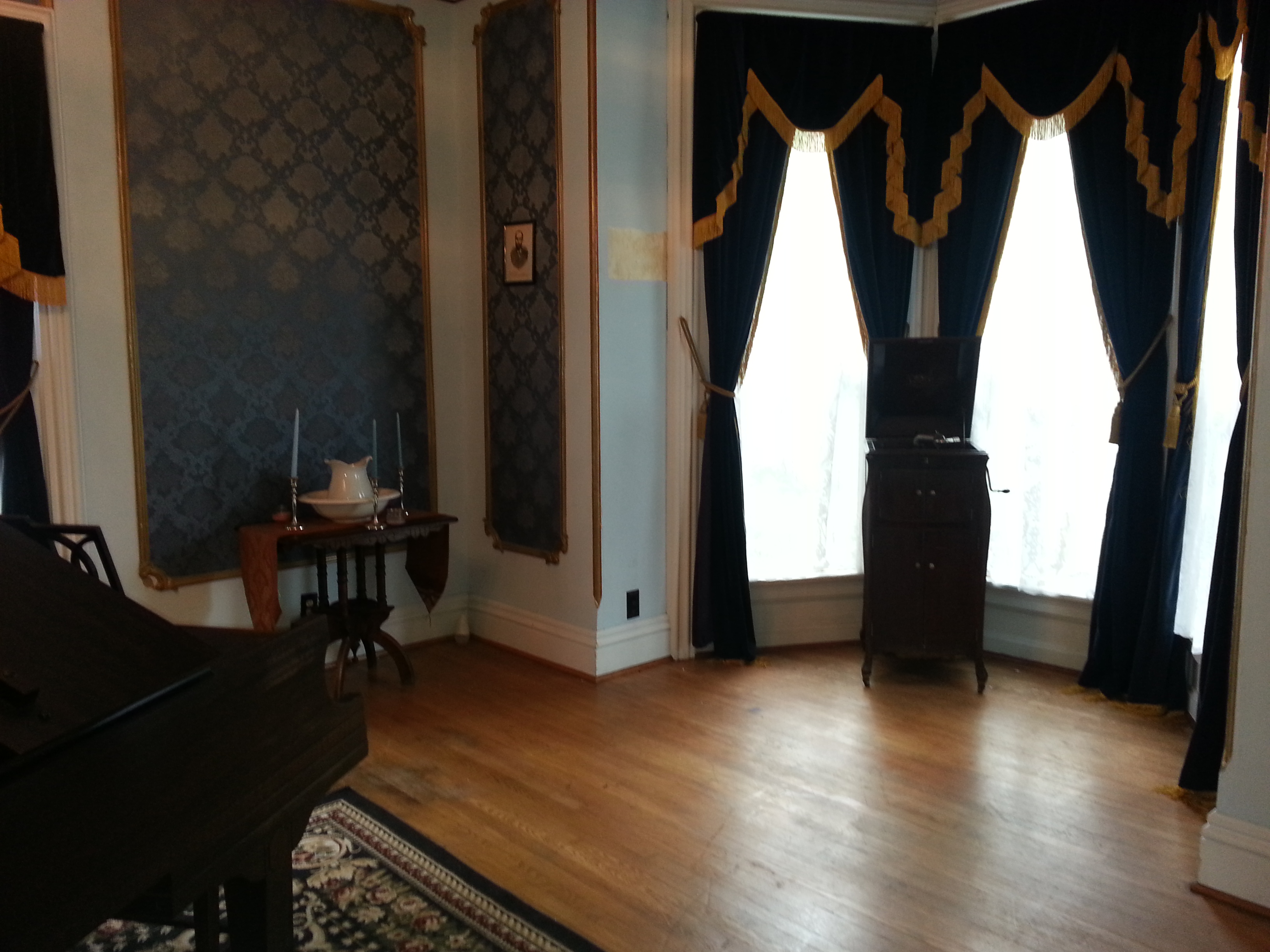
File:Conklin_Mountain_House_Music_Room_August_19_2016.jpg
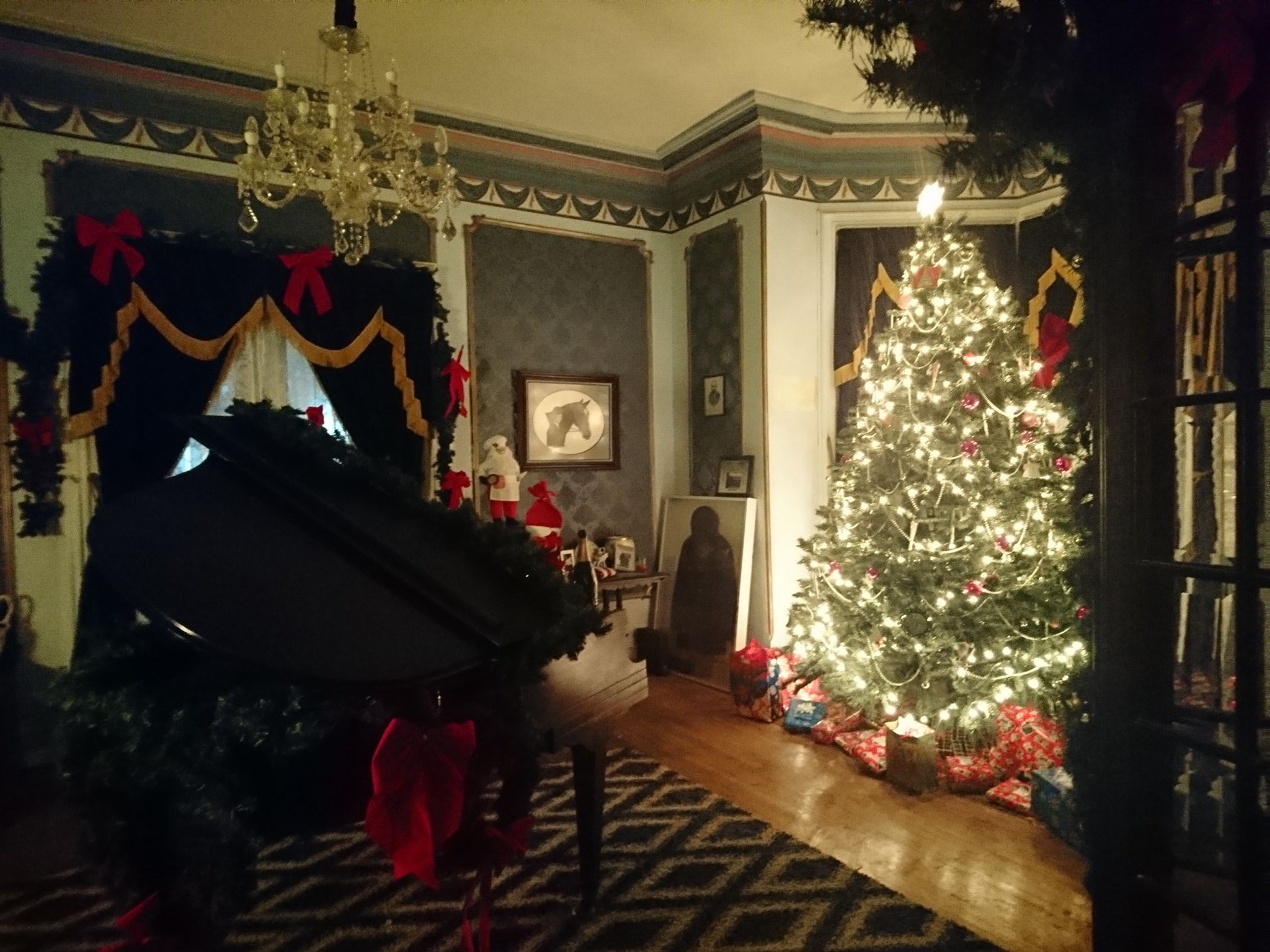
File:MusicRoomChristmas.jpg

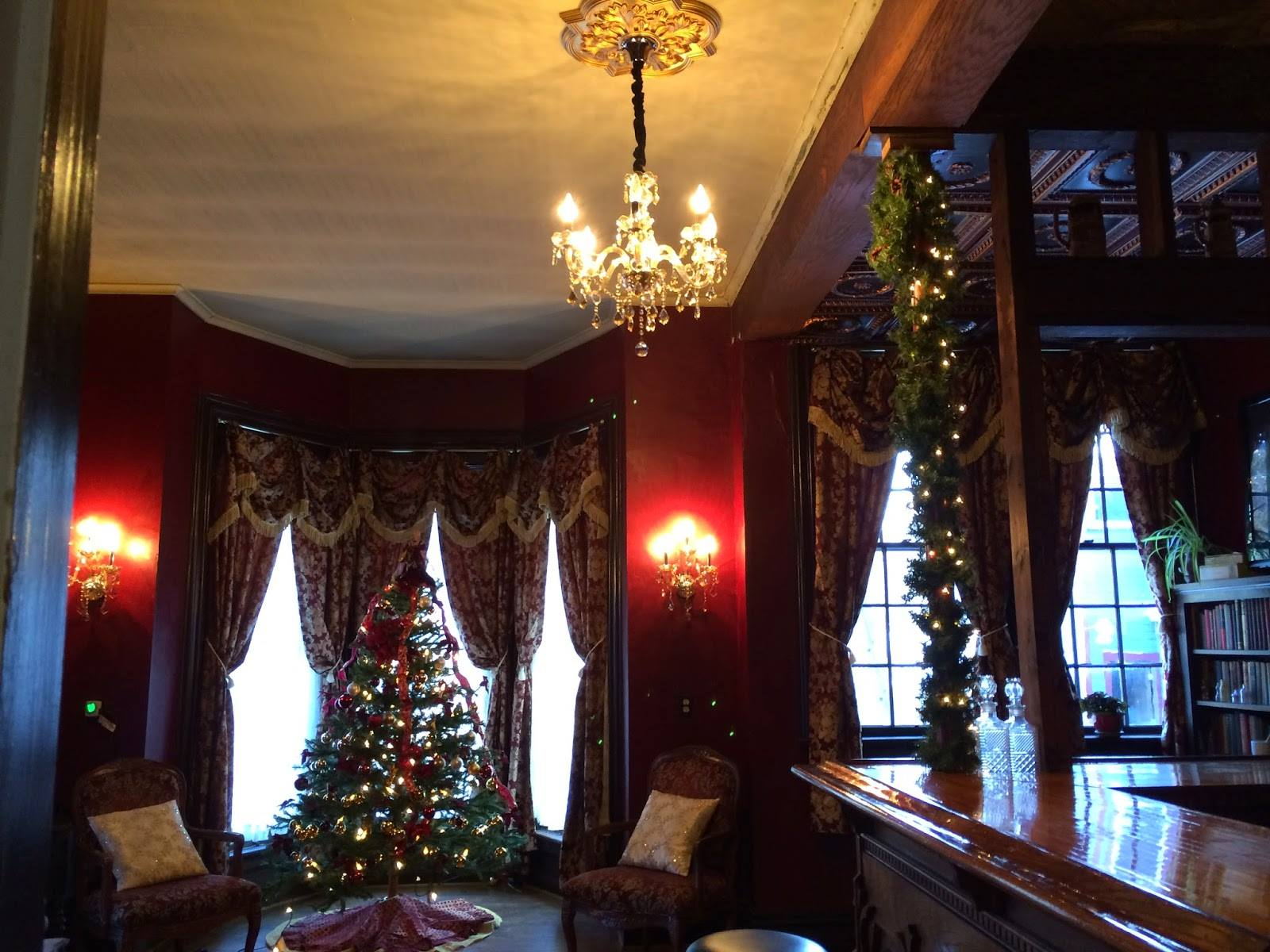
File:LibraryChristmas.jpg

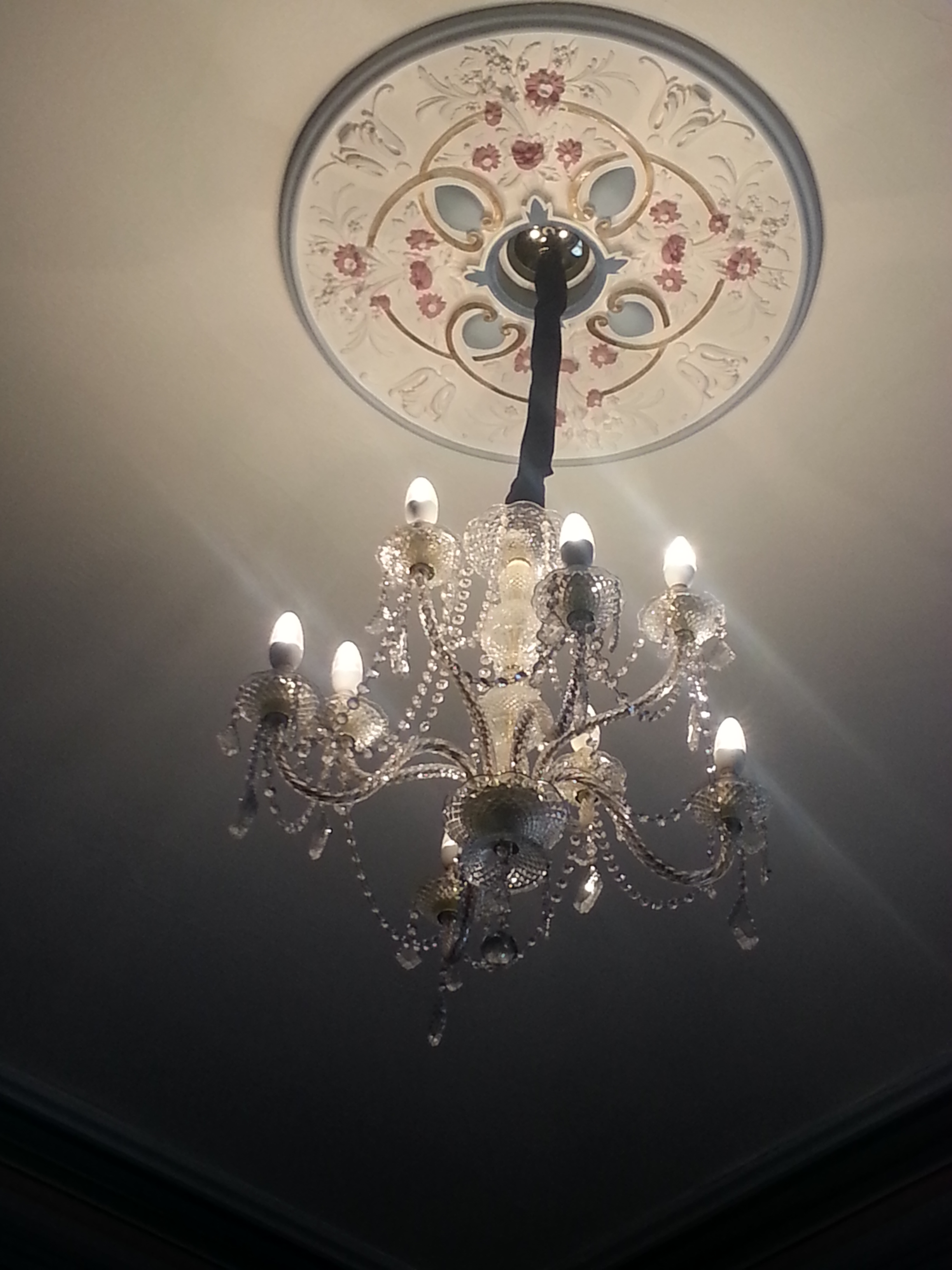
File:Conklin_Mountain_House_Music_Room_Chandelier_2017.jpg

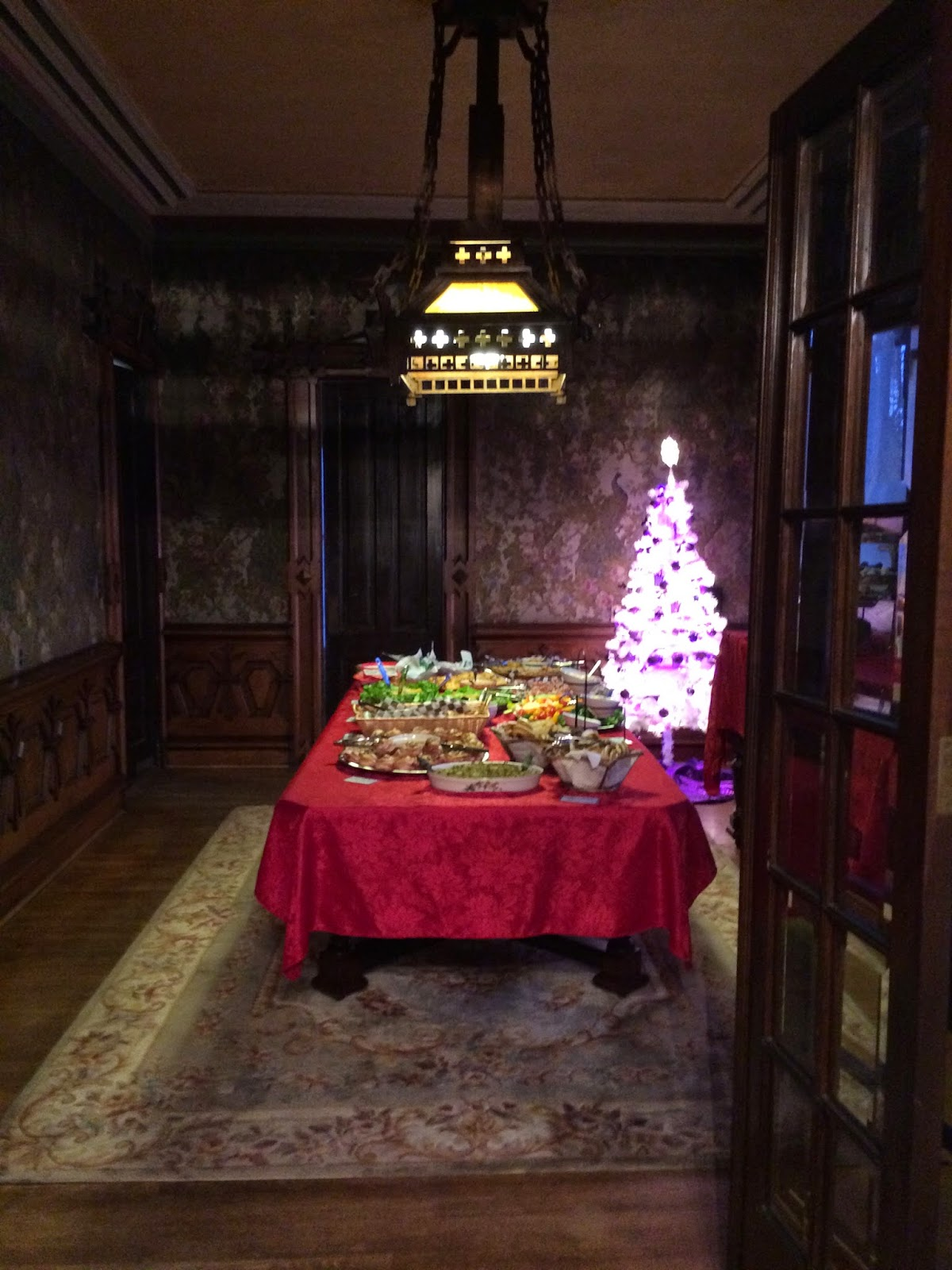
File:Conklin_Mountain_House_-_Dining_Room_Overview.jpg

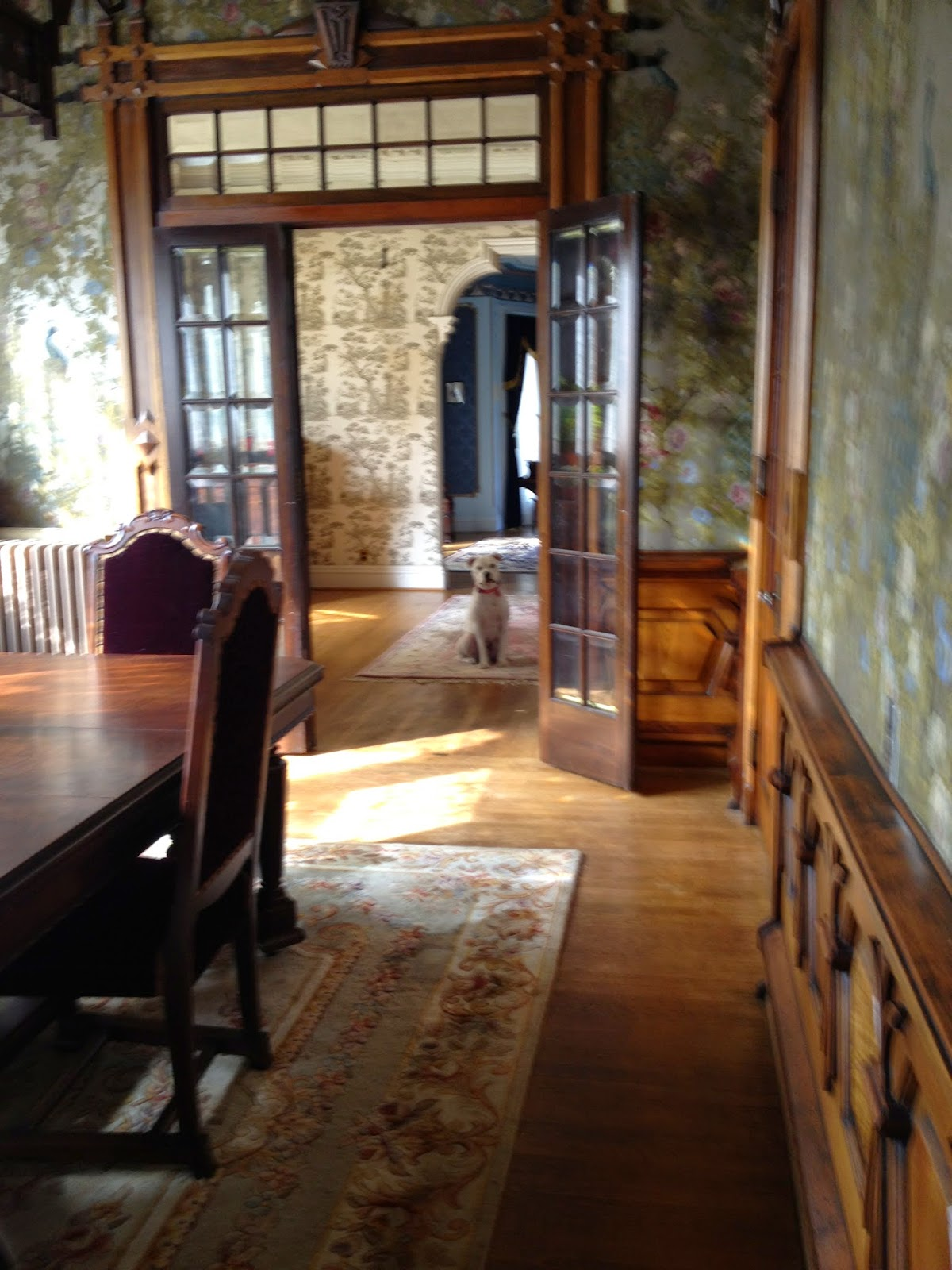
File:Conklin_Mountain_House_-_Dining_Room.jpg

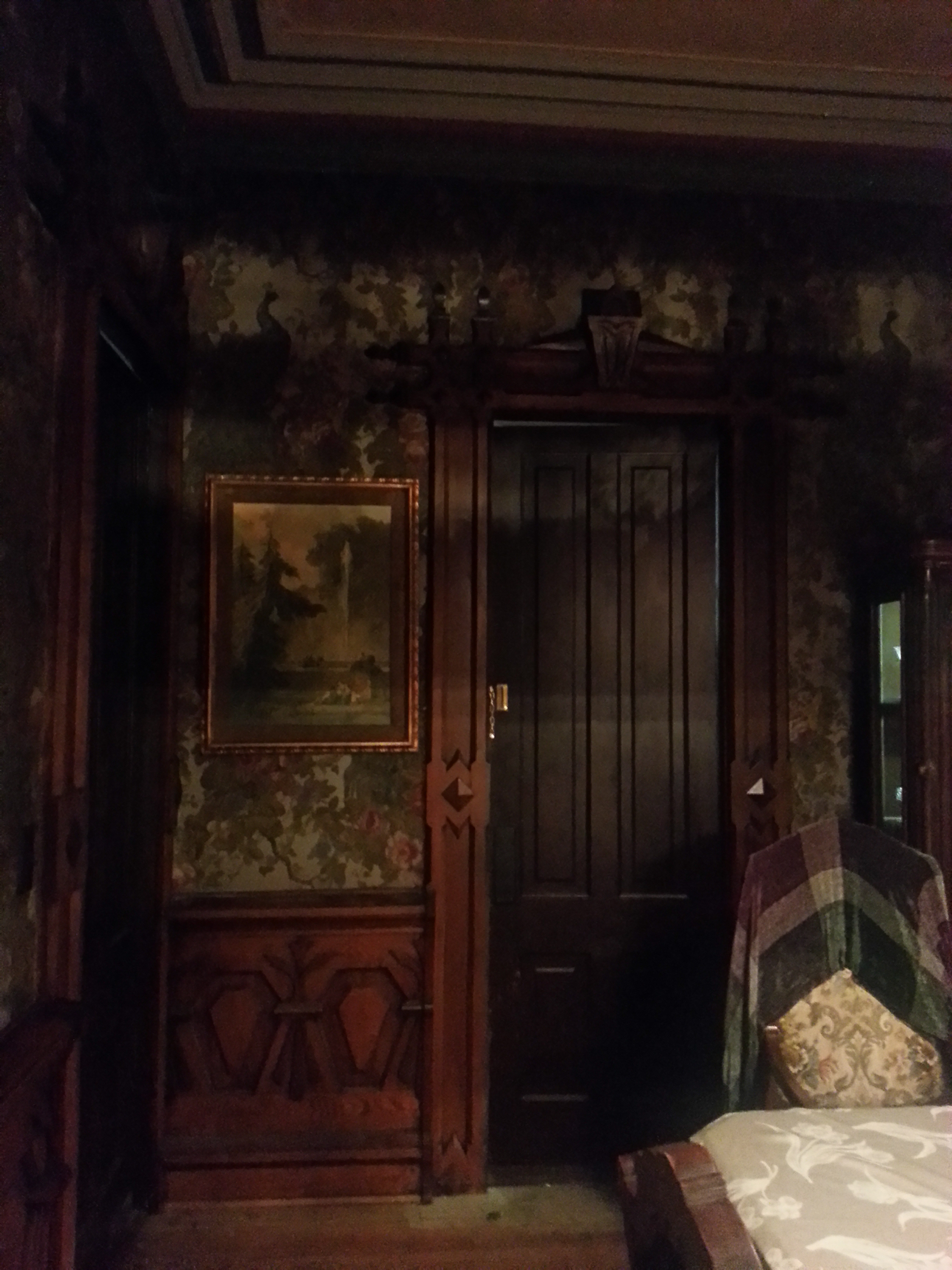
File:Conklin_Mountain_House_Dining_Room_SouthEast_Corner_April_2017.jpg

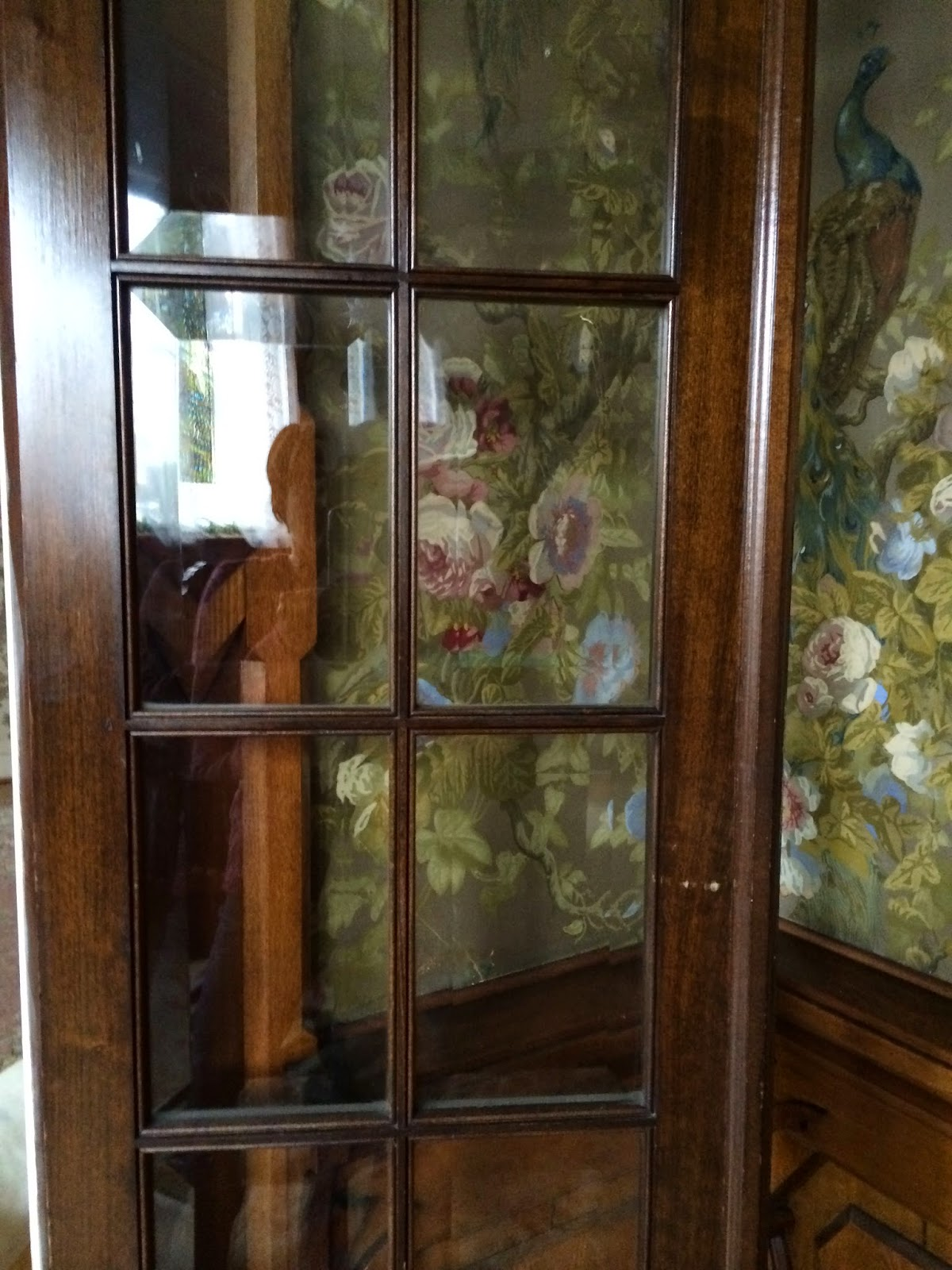
File:Conklin_Mountain_House_-_Dining_Room_Corner.jpg

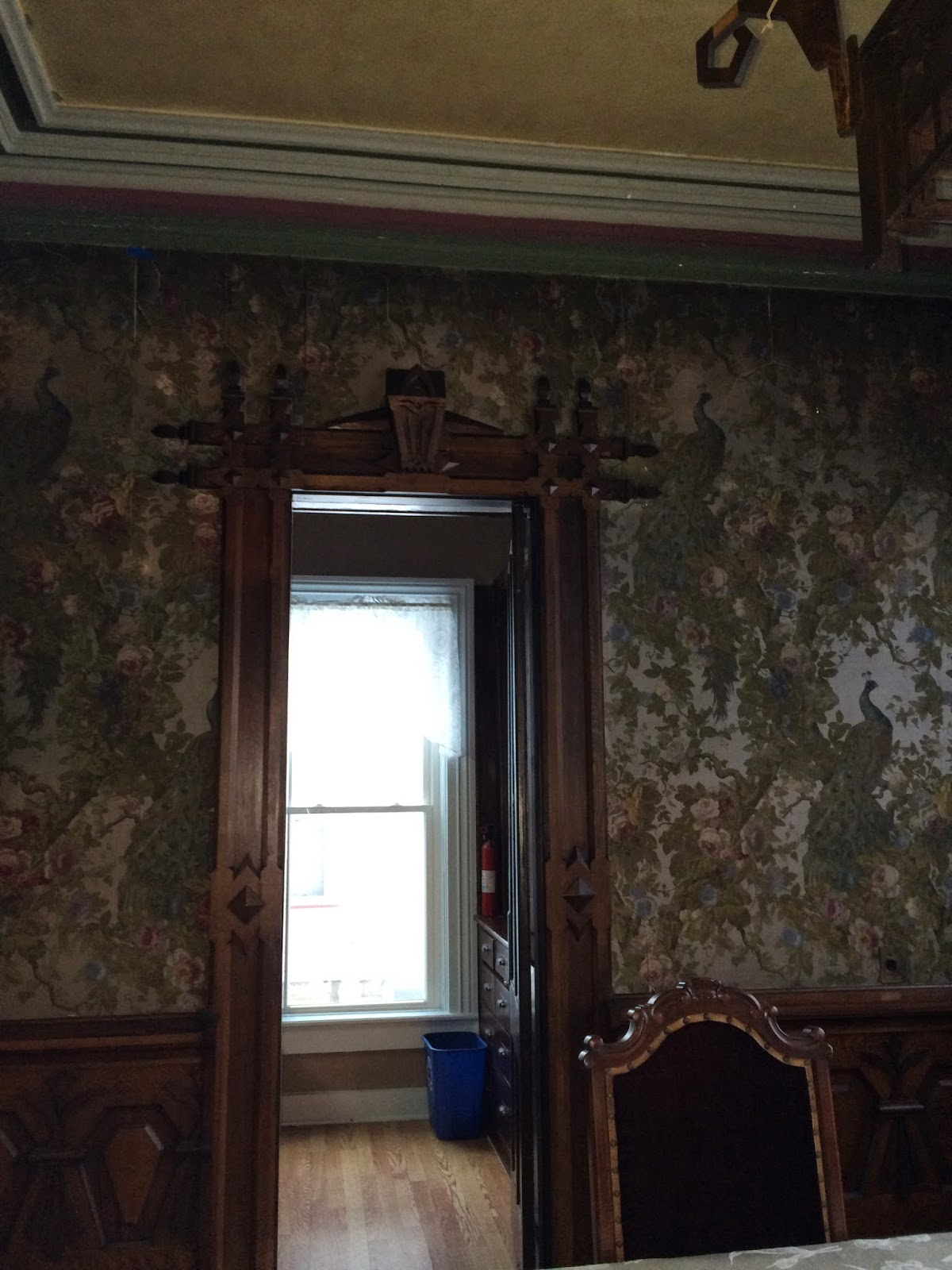
File:DiningRoomWallpaper.jpg

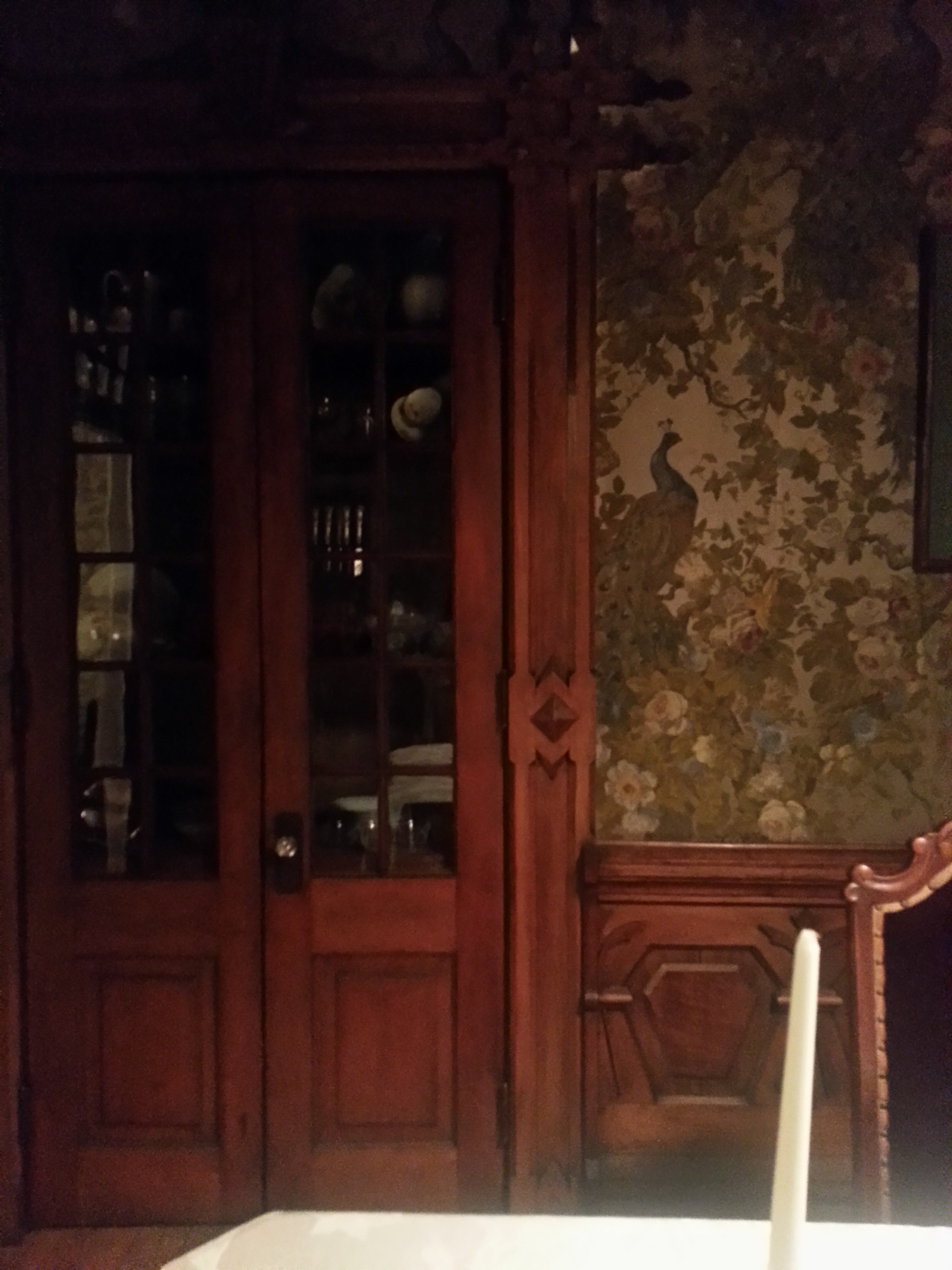
File:Conklin_Mountain_House_Dining_Room_NorthWest_Corner_April_2017.jpg

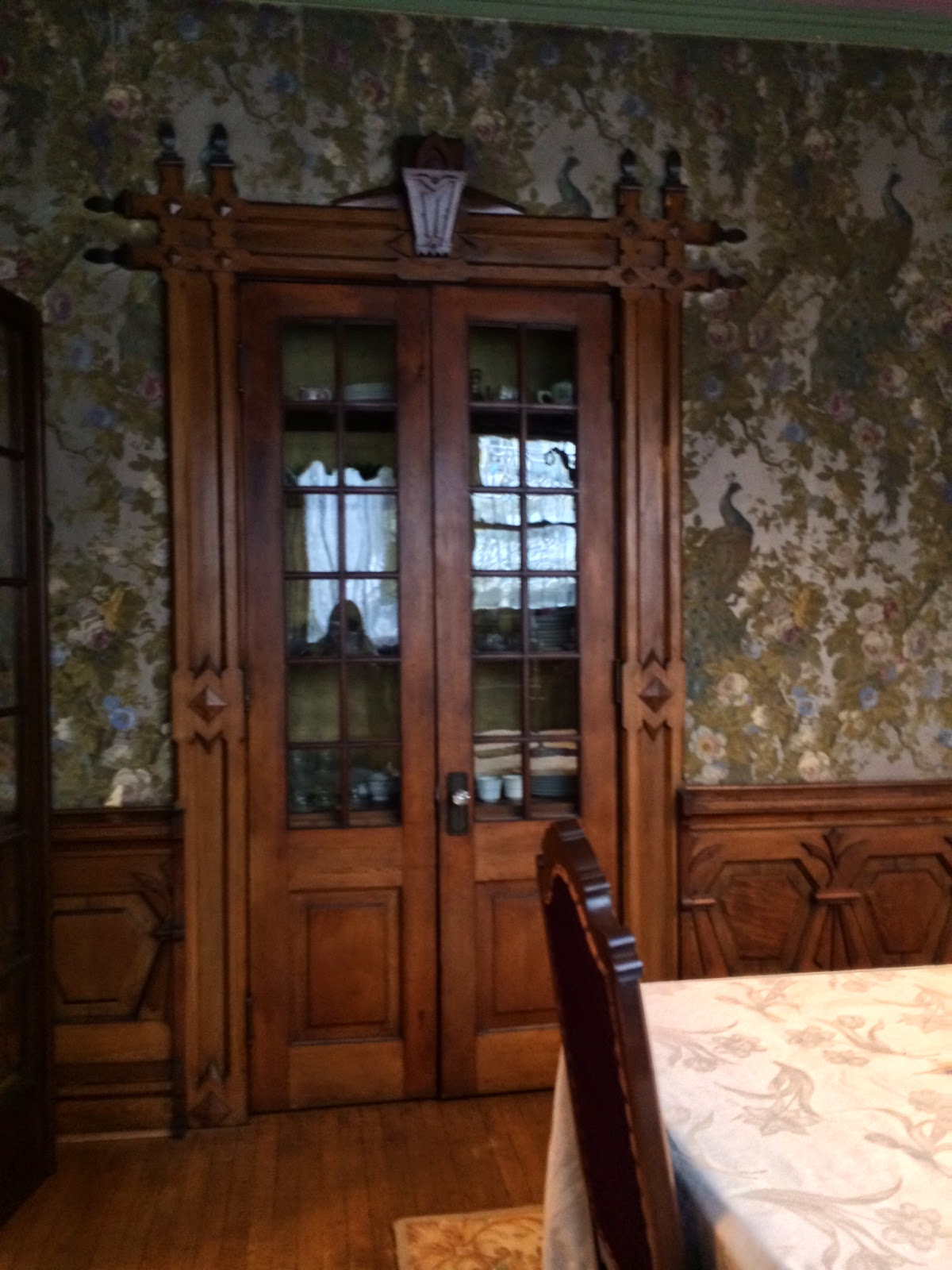
File:DiningRoom1.jpg

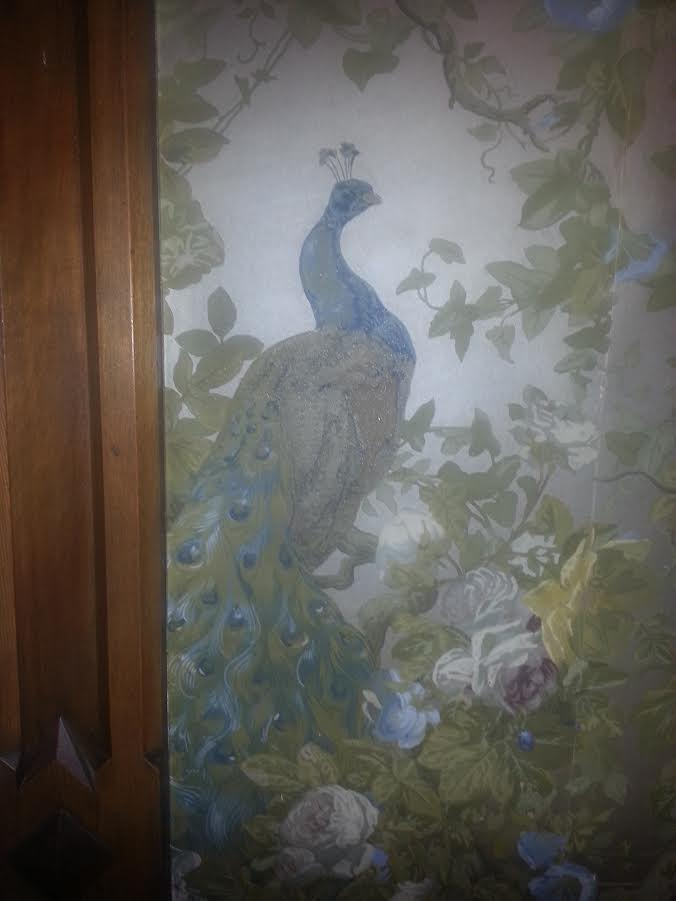
File:Conklin_Mountain_House_M.H._Birge_Peacock.jpg

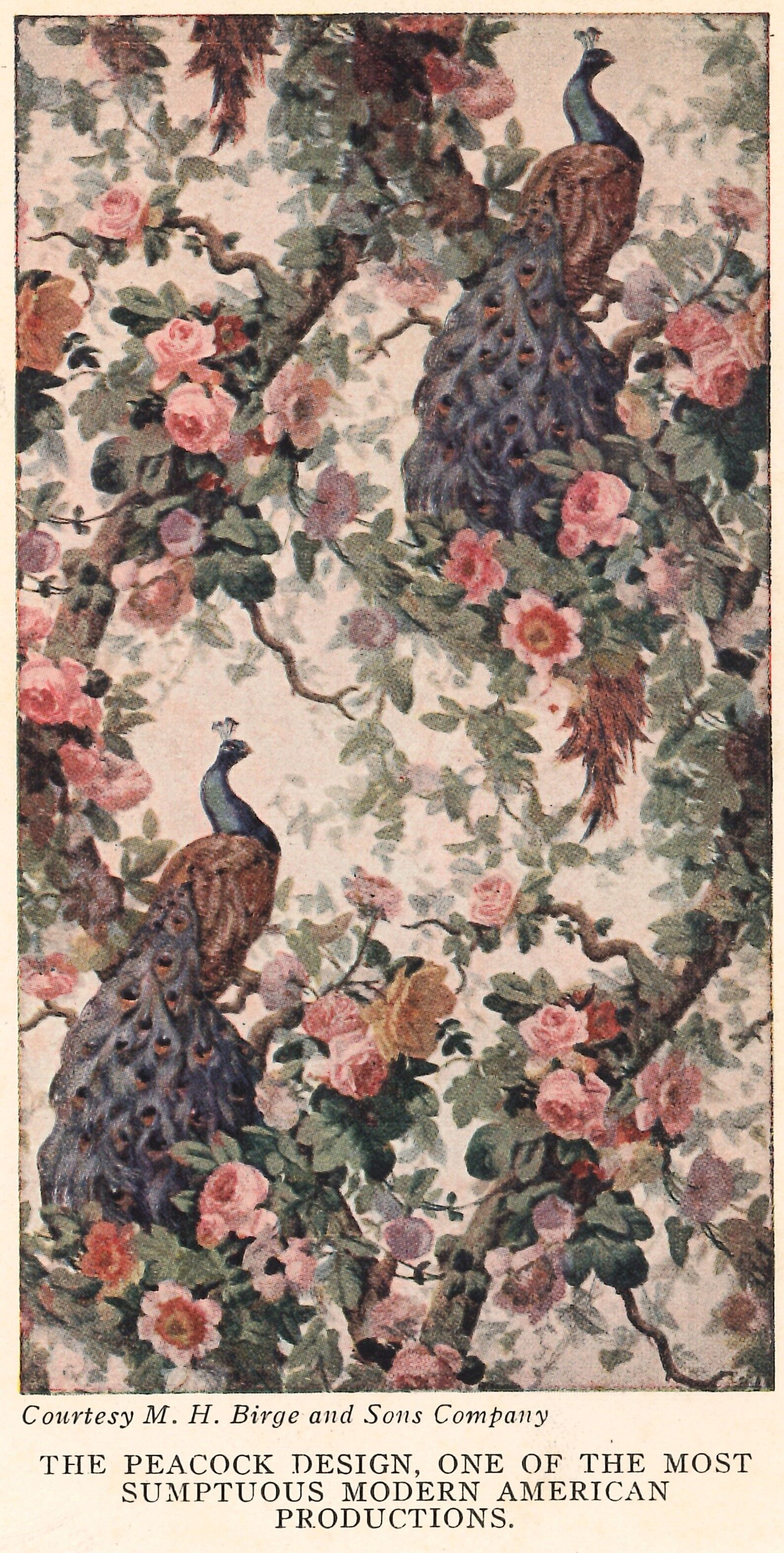
File:V3Znb1EI.jpg
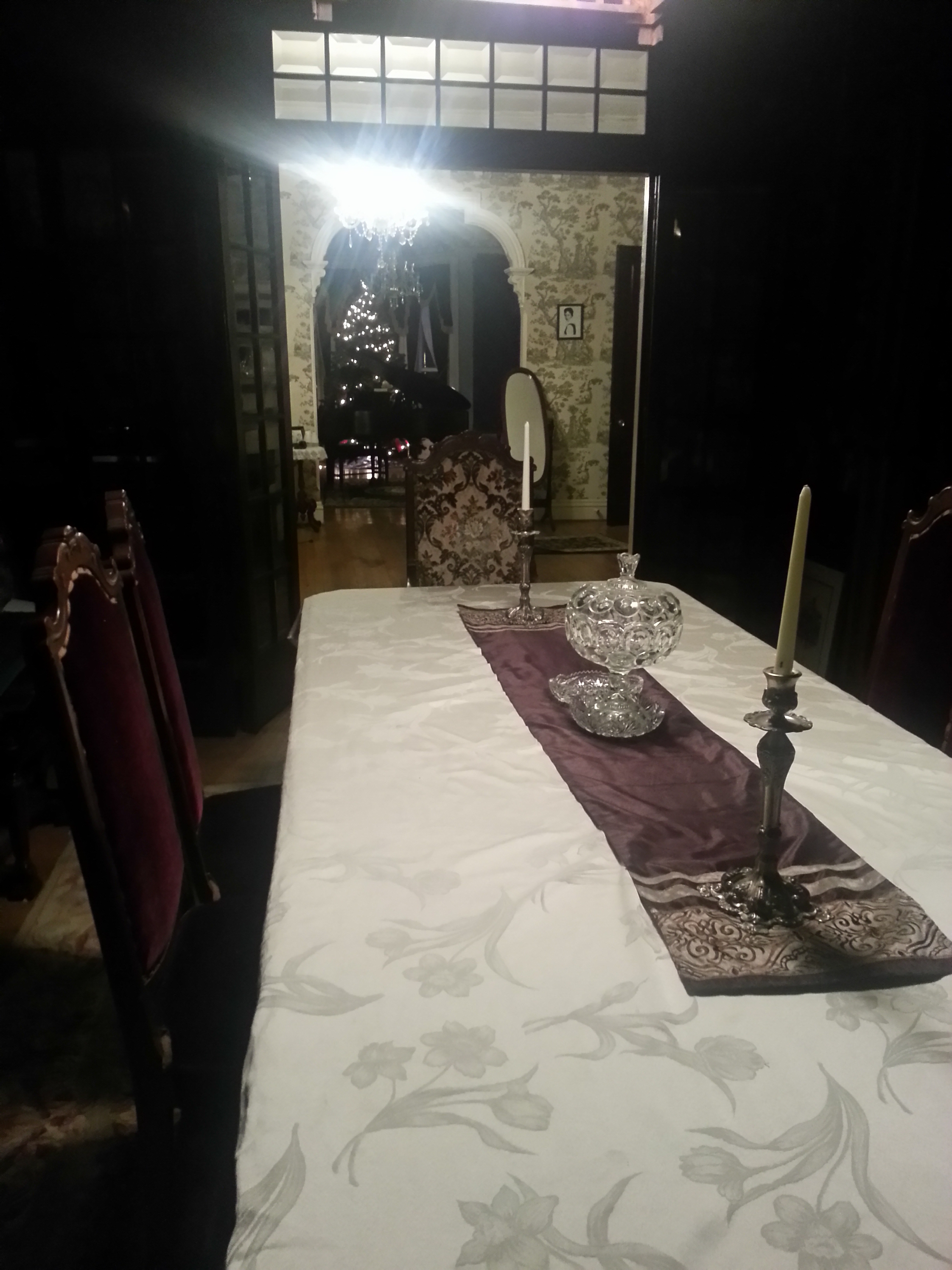
File:Conklin_Mountain_House_Dining_Room_to_Ladies_Salon_View_April_2017.jpg

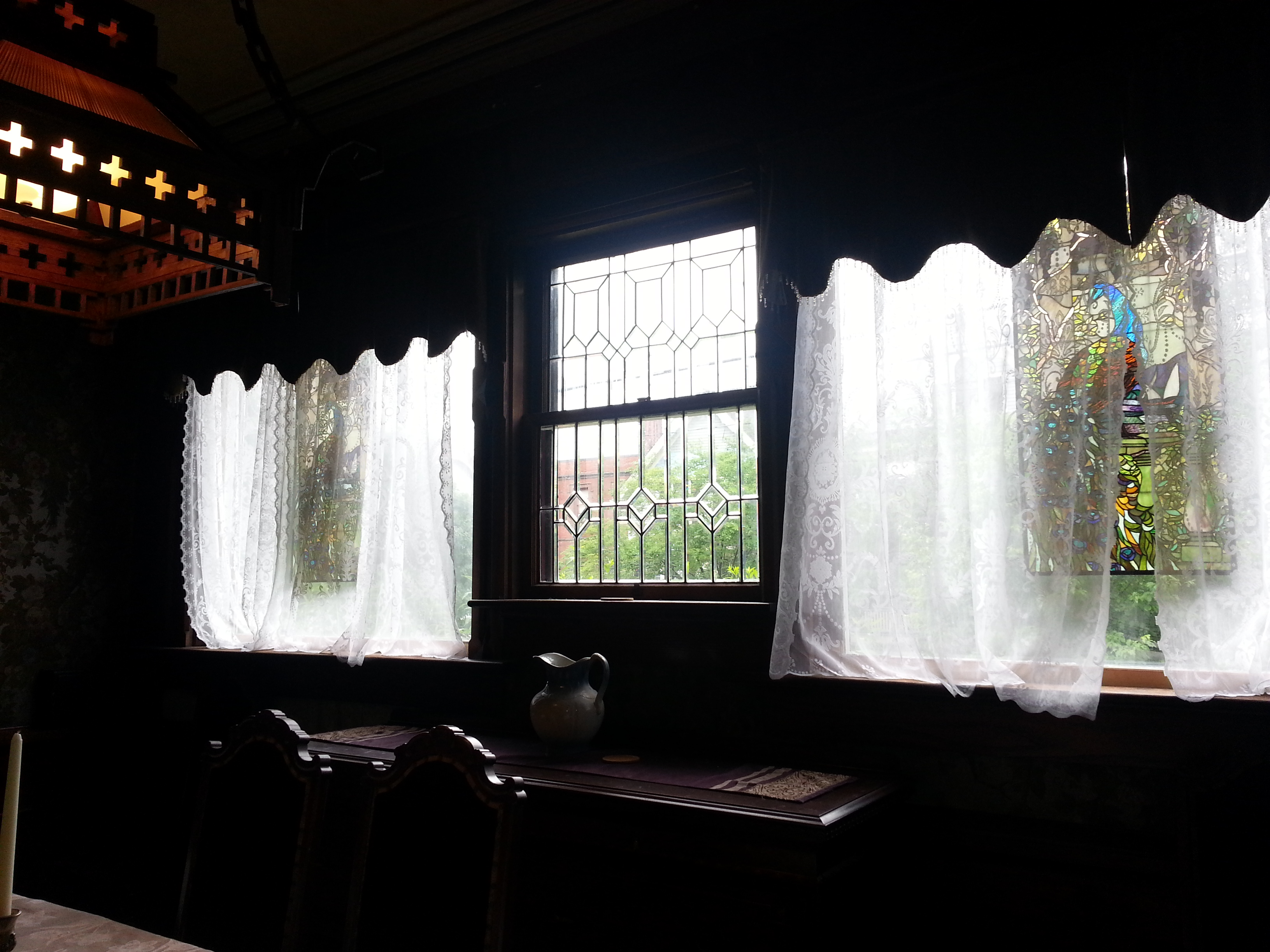
File:Conklin_Mountain_House_Dining_Room_Window_Treatments_2017.jpg

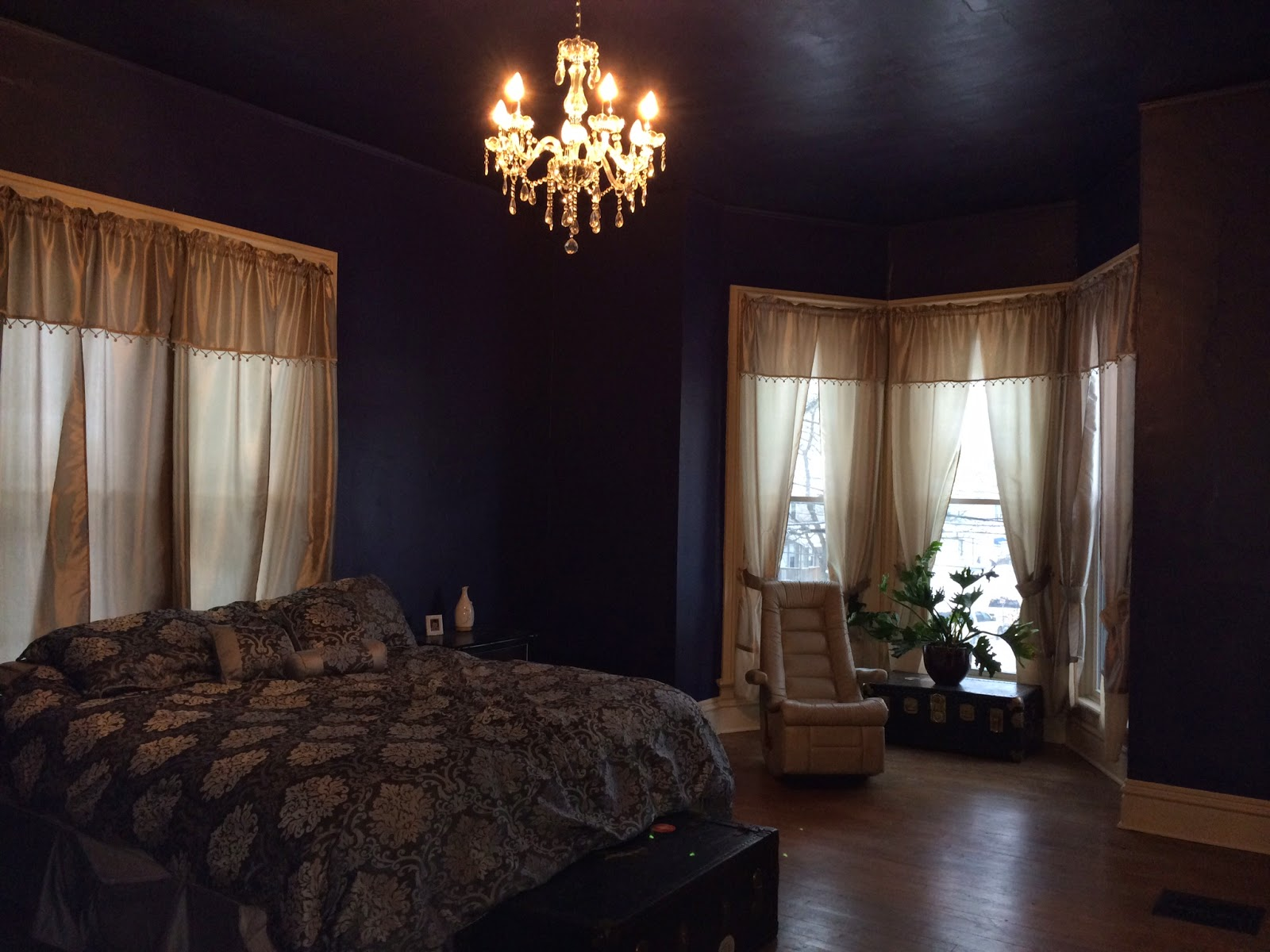
File:Conklin_Mountain_House_-_Main_Bedroom.jpg

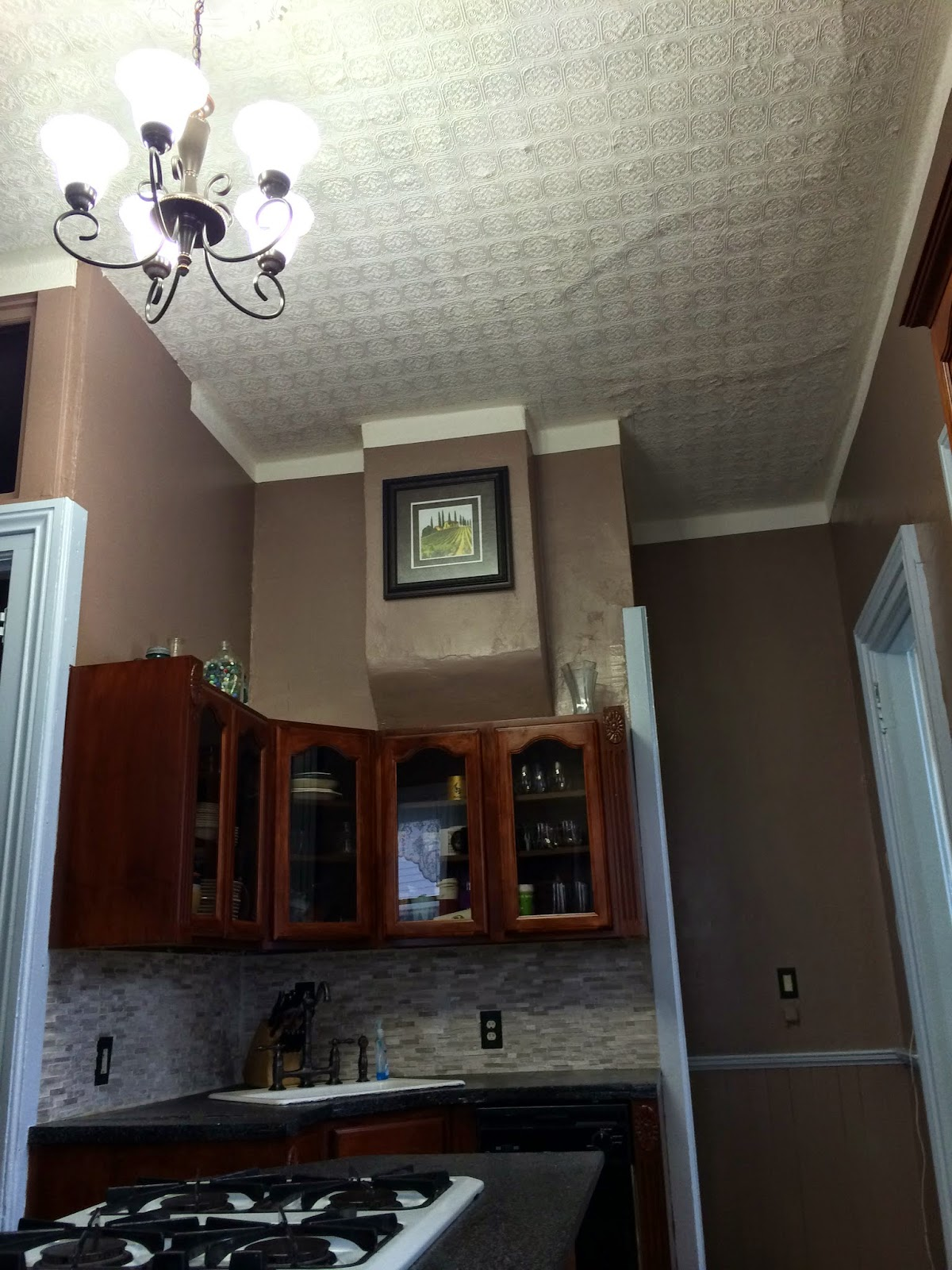
File:Conklin_Mountain_House_-_Kitchen1.jpg

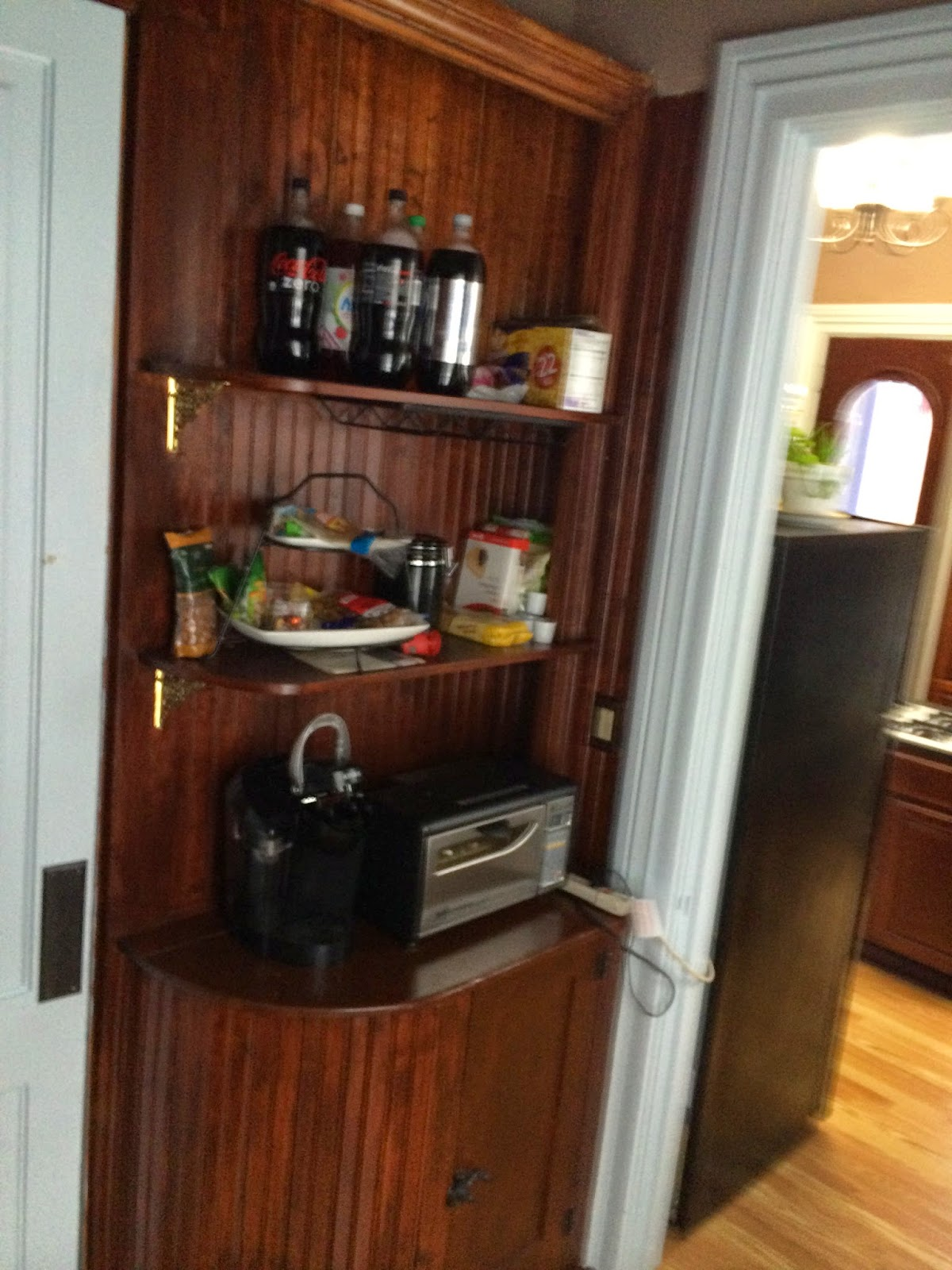
File:Conklin_Mountain_House_-_Butler's_pantry_2.jpg

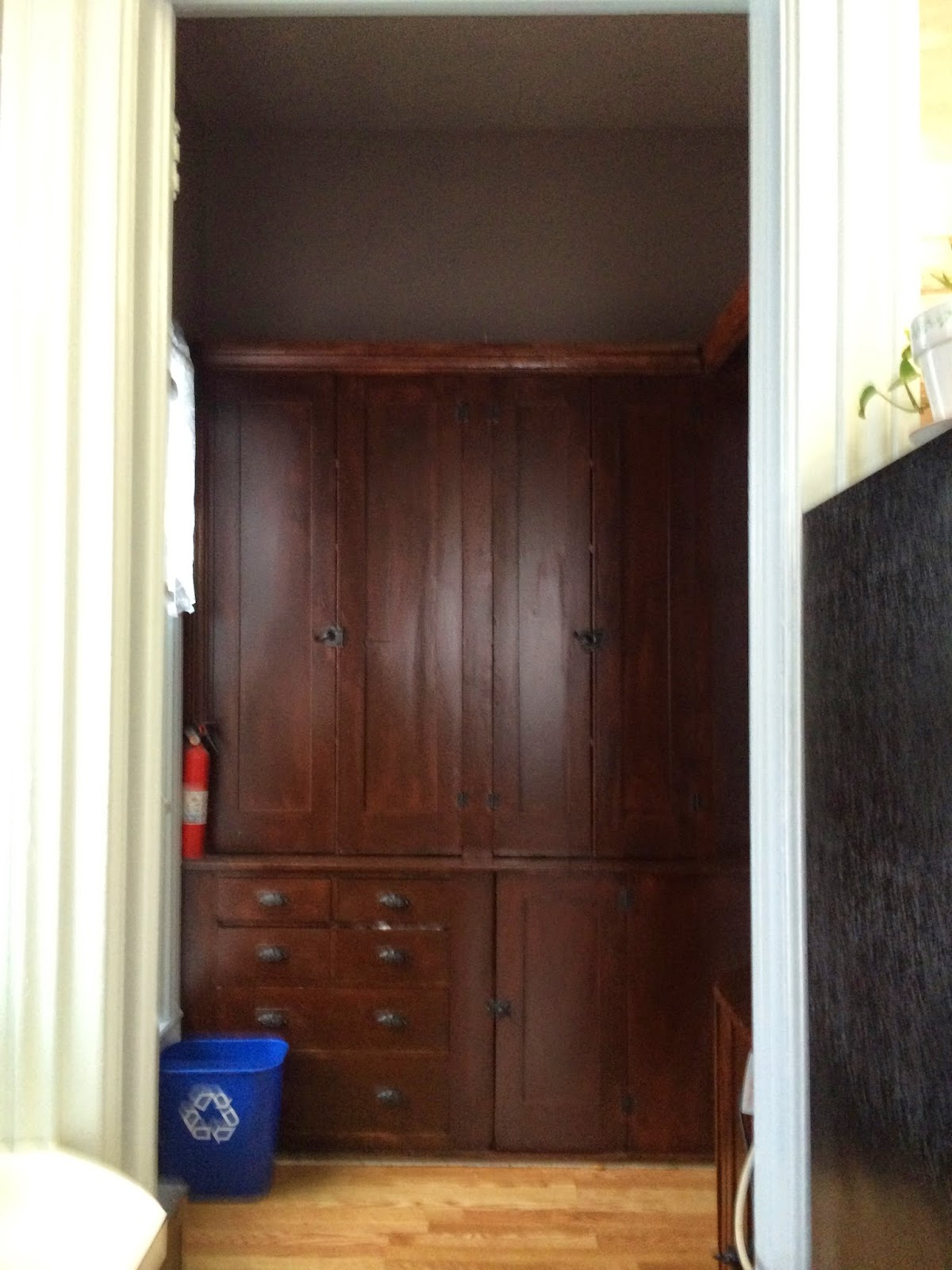
File:Conklin_Mountain_House_-_Butler's_pantry_1.jpg

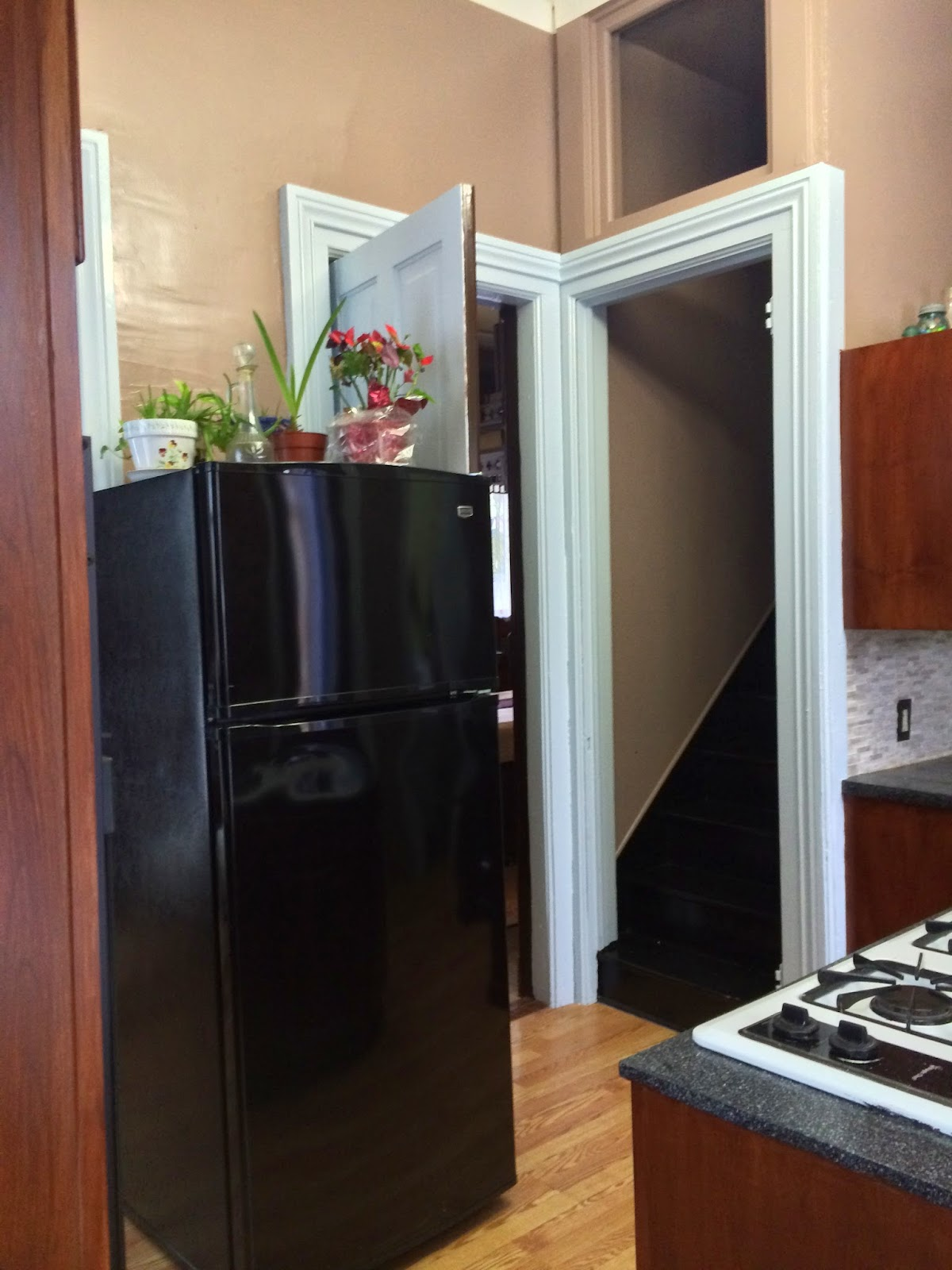
File:Conklin_Mountain_House_-_Kitchen_3.jpg

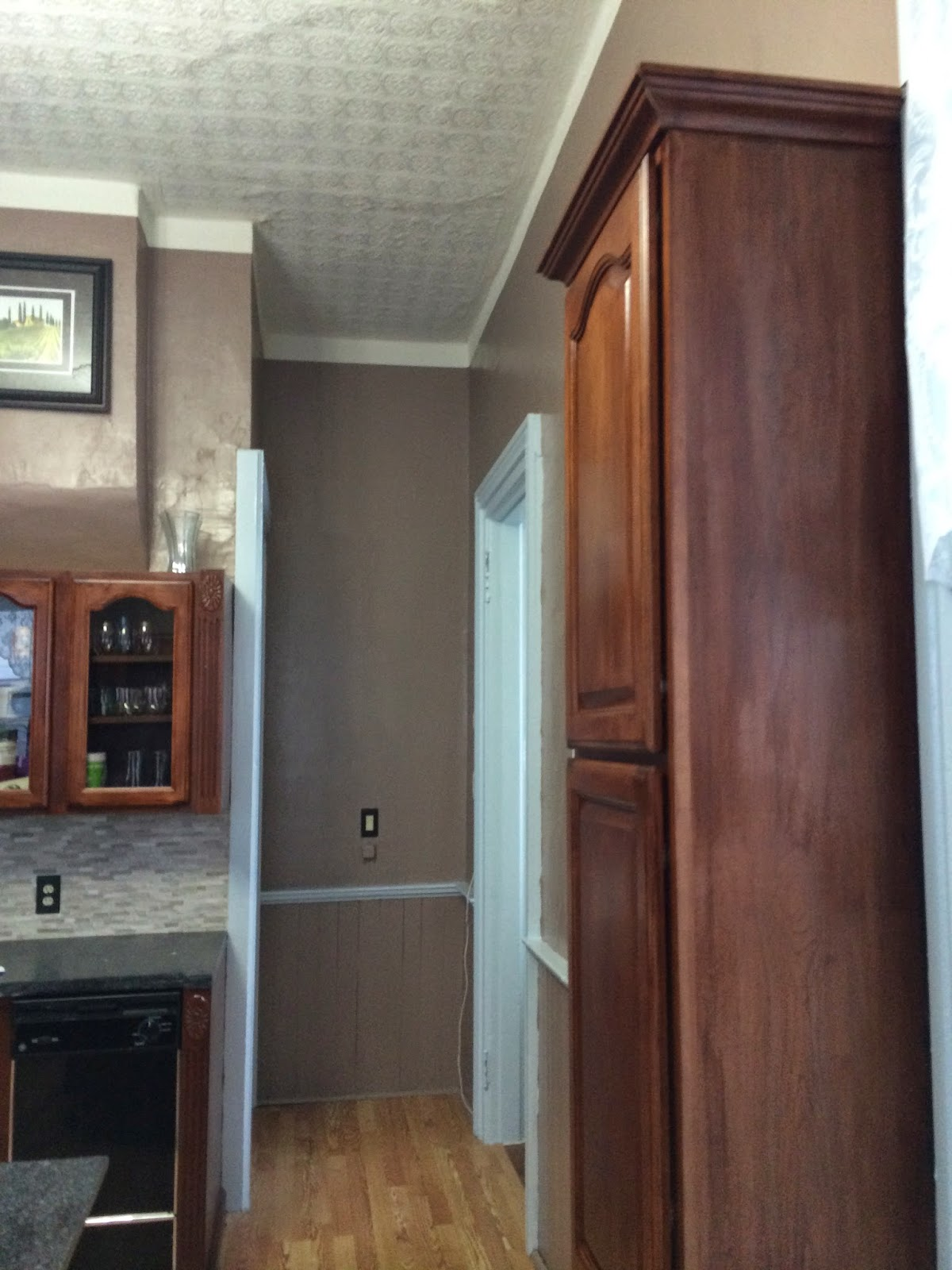
File:Conklin_Mountain_House_-_Kitchen2.jpg

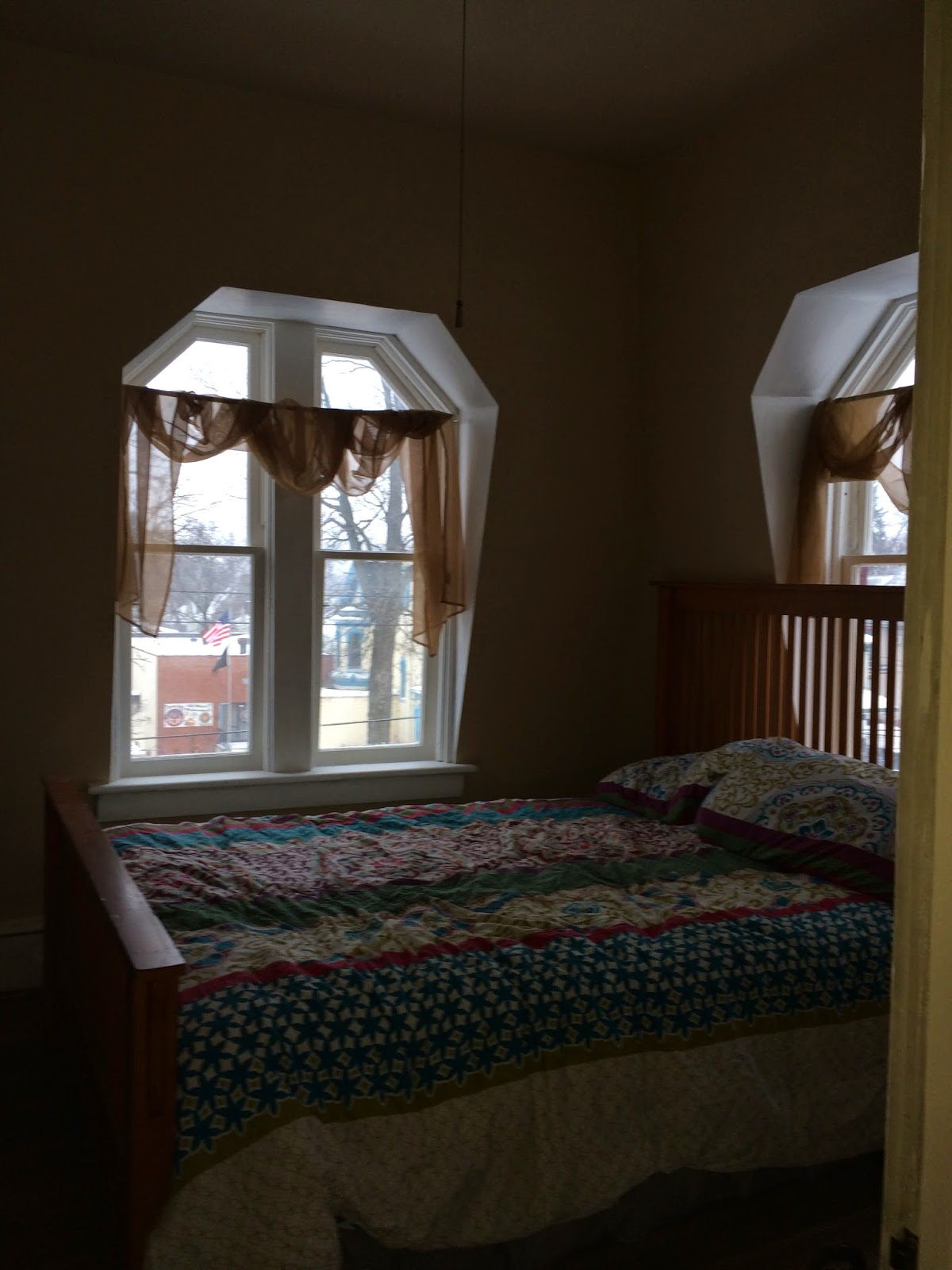
File:Conklin_Mountain_House_-_Tower_Room_2016.jpg

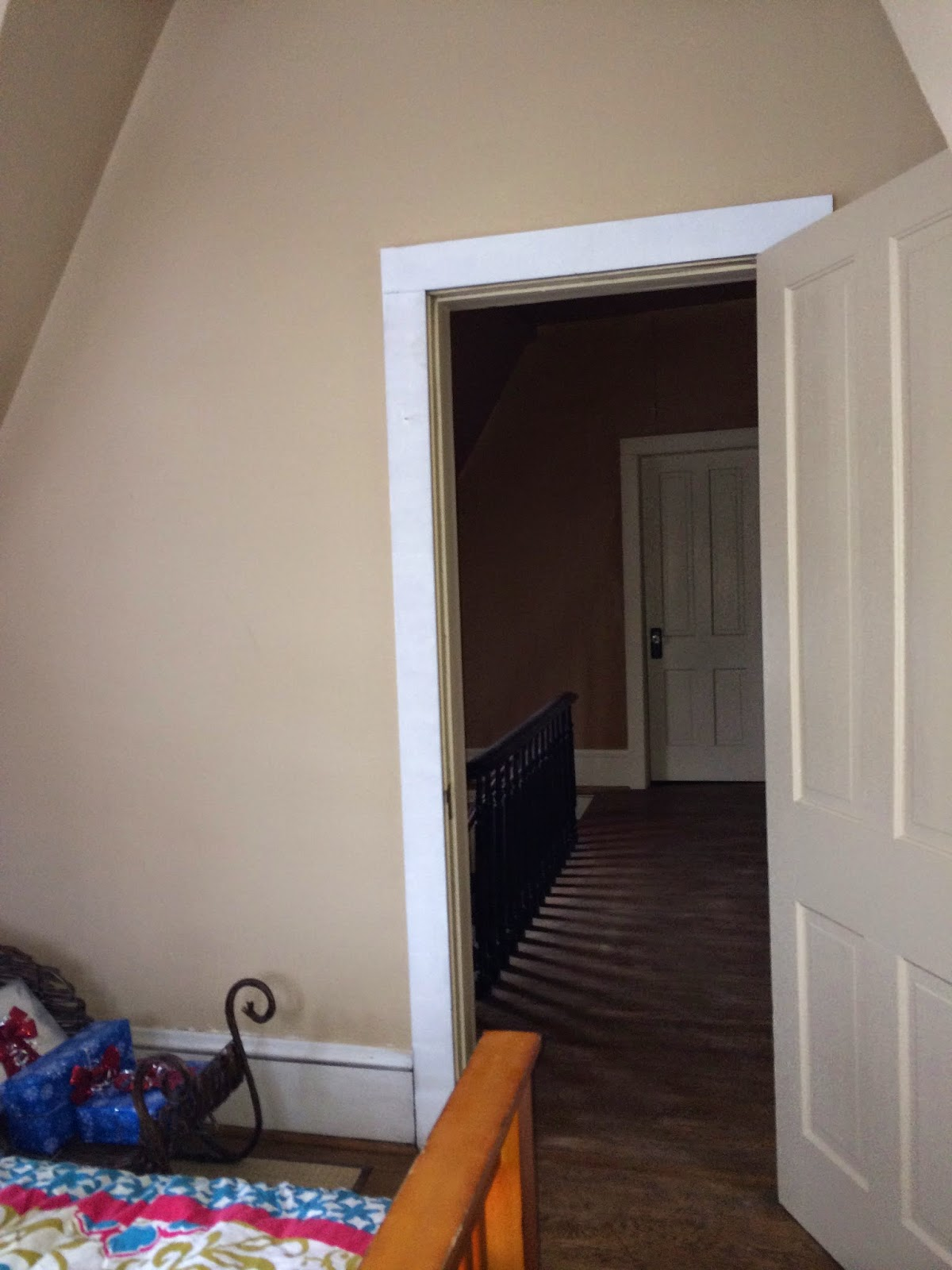
File:Conklin_Mountain_House_-_Tower_to_Hall.jpg

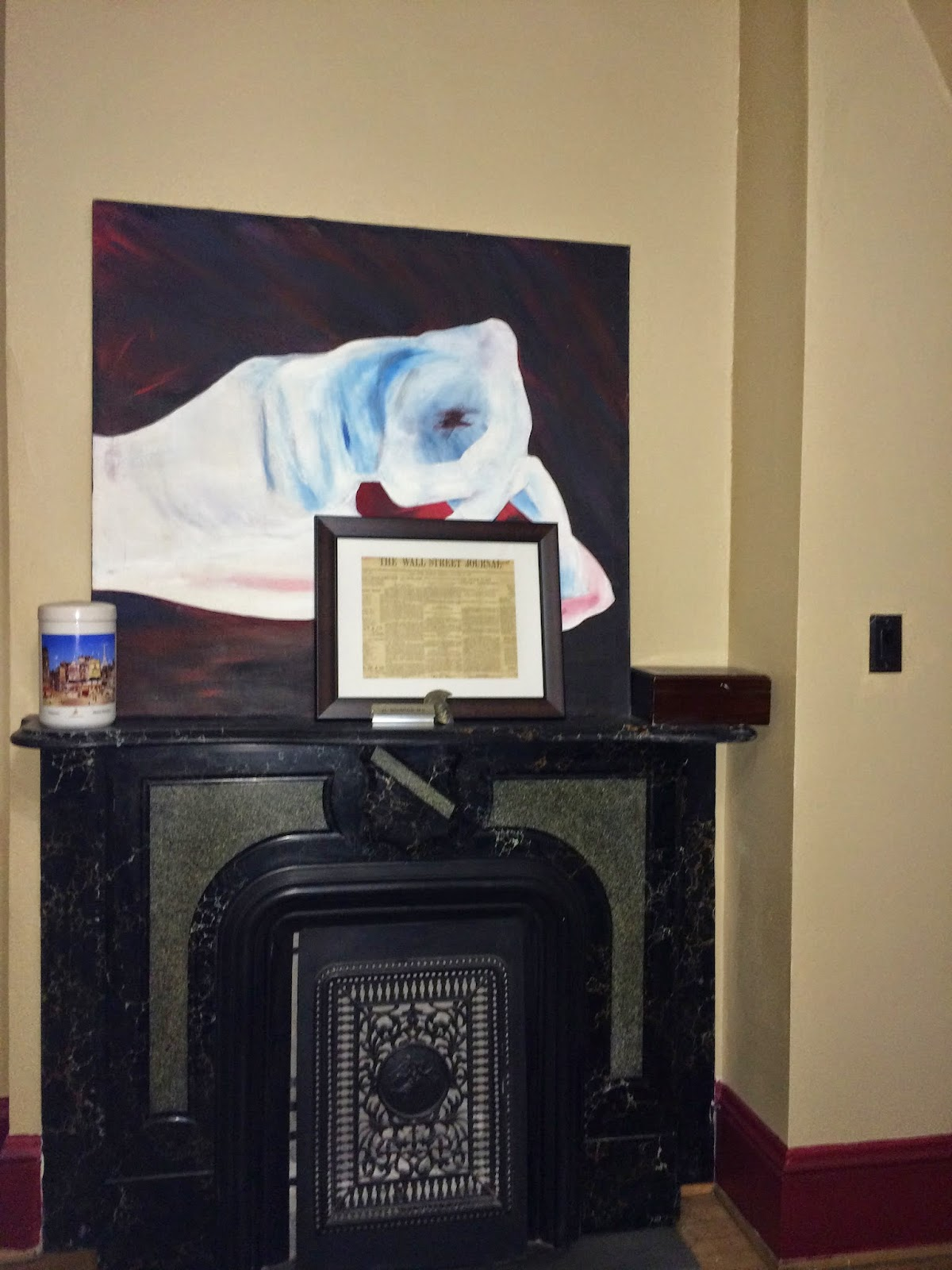
File:Conklin_Mountain_House_-_Third_Floor_Master_Fireplace.jpg

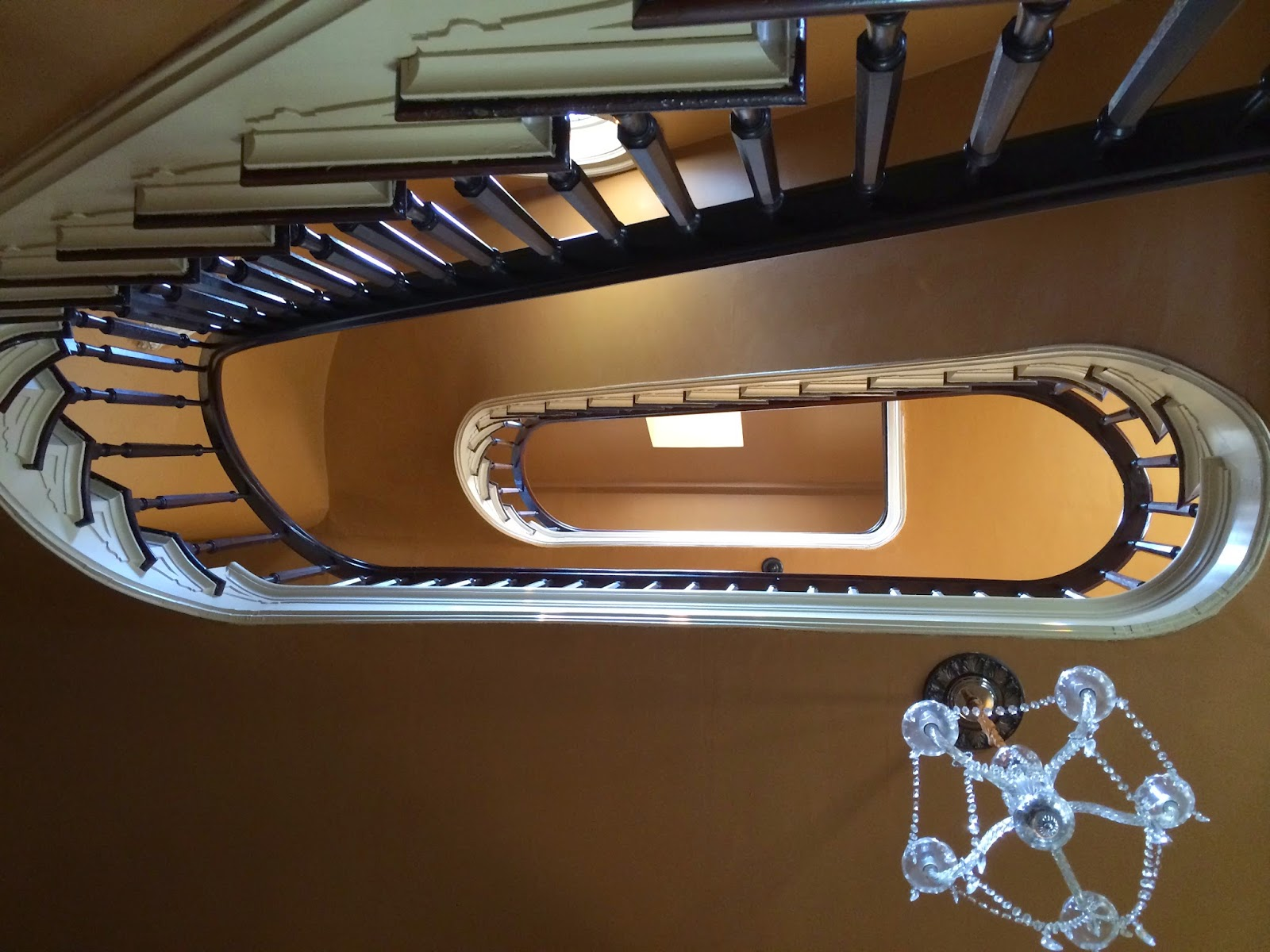
File:Conklin_Mountain_House_-_A_view_up_the_stairs.jpg

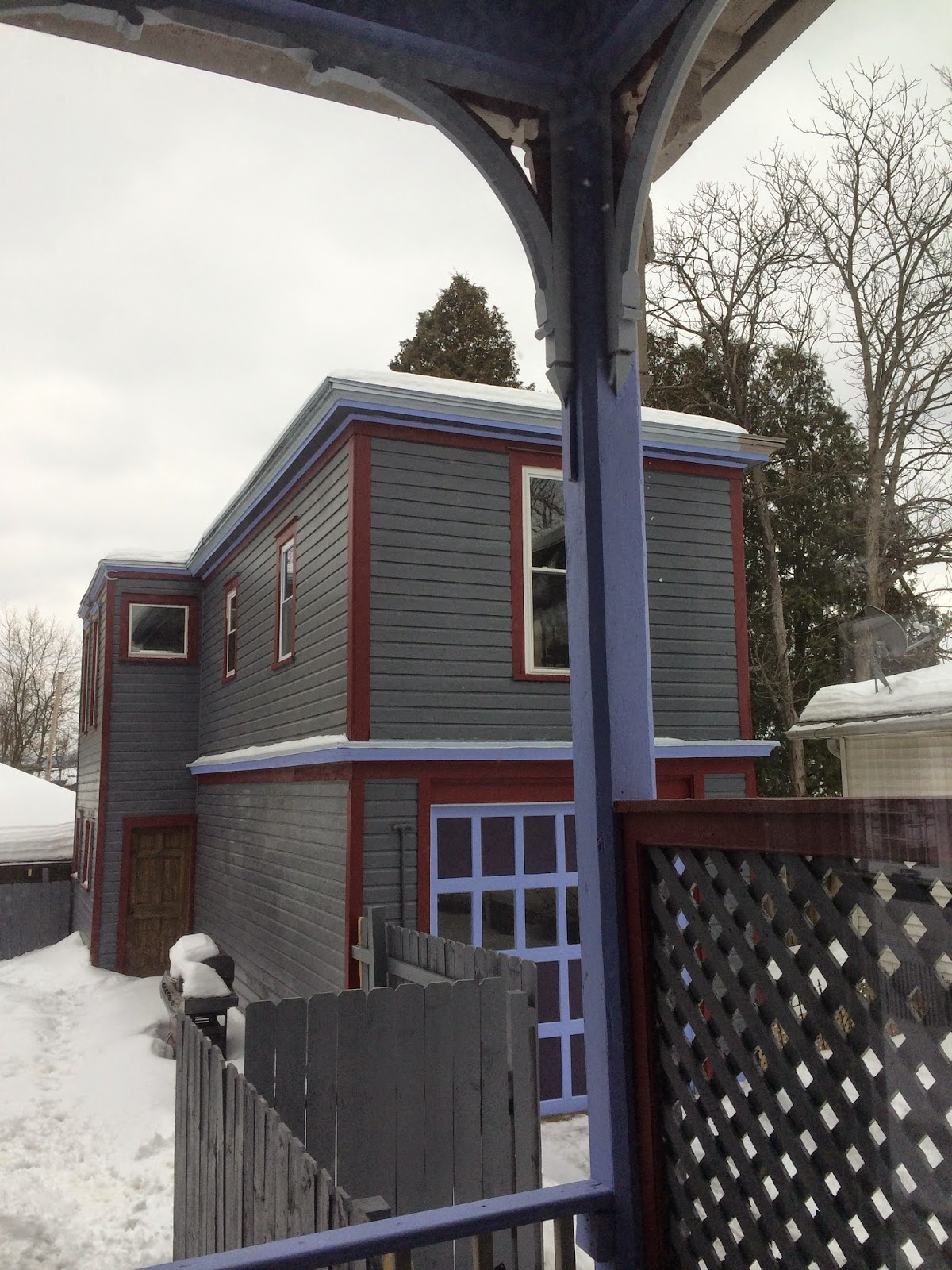
File:Conklin_Mountain_House_-_Two_story_carriage_house_garage.jpg

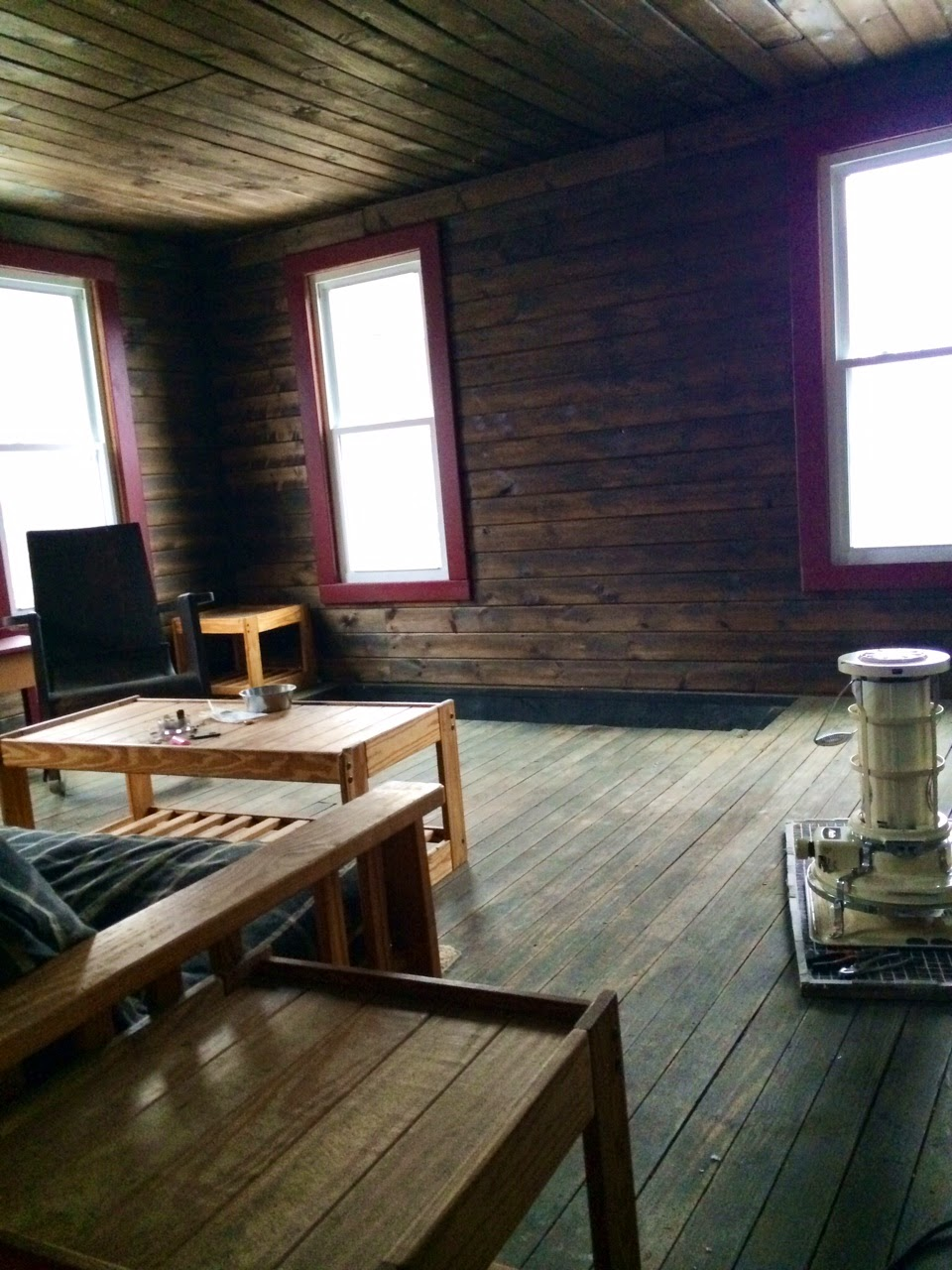
File:Conklin_Mountain_House_-_Second_floor_of_the_carriage_house.jpg

== Sources ==
- Everis (1879). History of Cattaraugus County, New York.
