= Fleet's Hall =

Building that once stood in Oyster Bay, New York

Coordinates: 40°52′29.77″N 73°31′42.92″W

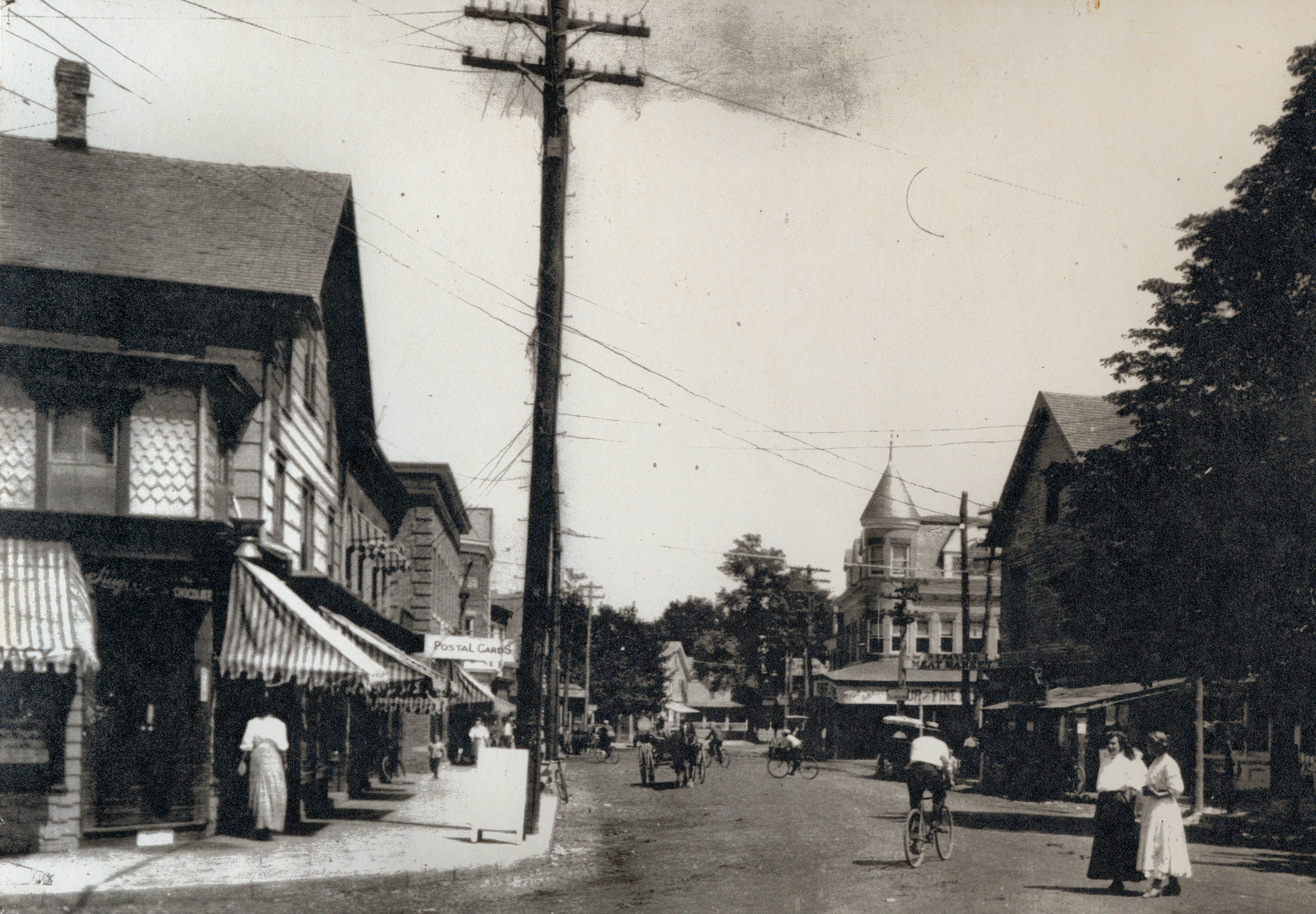
Historic Oyster Bay photo ca. 1890 showing Snouder's Drug Store in left foreground, Moore's Building in right background, and Fleet's Hall to the right of that in the foreground.

Fleet's Hall is a building that once stood in Oyster Bay, New York, that had important local, statewide, and national significance. The building served as an important civic and social meeting place during the time that Theodore Roosevelt was a resident of Oyster Bay and served as Governor of New York State and later President of the United States. The building was used for events such as public meetings, concerts, receptions, dances, and dinners. It was also the site of the first moving picture screening in Oyster Bay.

== History ==
Fleet's Hall was the creation of Samuel Van Wyck Fleet (1851-1911). No building was present at this corner of East Main and South Streets in Oyster Bay as late as 1885. Though by 1897, the Sanborn Fire Insurance Map of that year does show a building.

This is one of a small handful of buildings in Oyster Bay referred to by the name of the proprietor who had it built. Others include the Ludlam Building, Snouder's Drug Store, and the Moore's Building. What these buildings and others from the period have in common is that their owners fortunes rose and their businesses reached their greatest commercial success during the time that Theodore Roosevelt was Governor and then President.

Samuel Van Wyck Fleet was civically active in Oyster Bay. Among his credits were serving as one of the incorporators of Youngs Memorial Cemetery in Oyster Bay. Fleet's Hall would go on to serve as an important civic and social meeting place in Oyster Bay for many years to follow. When Theodore Roosevelt was elected Governor of New York State in 1898, a great celebration was held for him in Fleet's Hall.

Fleet's Hall served as polling place in 1904, when Roosevelt was on the Republican ticket for president. William S. Moore, the committeeman responsible for calling the election, had missed a train and was delayed in arriving to Oyster Bay. Voters did not think it appropriate to hold an election without Moore being present. So, the next day, U.S. District Attorney William J. Youngs, and Nassau County Republican Committee Chairman Charles Lewis ordered another election be held April 2.

That night only one voter, James Buchanan, made his way to the election. As The New York Times later reported:

"Dark and gloomy was the hall when the faithful Buchanan made his entrance. Not a living soul did he find in the hall, and down he sat to await the arrival of his friends and neighbors of the Fifth. Buchanan meditated amid the lonely surroundings for half an hour."

Theodore Roosevelt would often come from the White House to Fleet's Hall, so he could vote in his own district. This was the case when he and his wife Edith returned for the 1908 Presidential Election.

According to his obituary in The New York Times, Samuel Fleet died "Suddenly at Oyster Bay, L.I., Aug. 8 [1911] in his 60th year." Fleet's Hall would continue to stand in Oyster Bay only a short time thereafter. It was demolished in the 1920s to make way for Nobman's Hardware Emporium. The building's pieces were incorporated into other buildings throughout Oyster Bay. Nobman's building subsequently burned in 2005, and was replaced by a new building that continues to have a commanding presence in the heart of Oyster Bay.

== See also ==
- Oyster Bay History Walk
- List of Town of Oyster Bay Landmarks
- National Register of Historic Places listings in Nassau County, New York
