= Wightman Memorial Baptist Church =

Church building in New York

North Shore Assembly of God (Oyster Bay, New York)

Religion
- Affiliation: Assemblies of God
- Leadership: Raymond Melograne

Location
- Location: Oyster Bay, New York, United States
- Interactive map of North Shore Assembly of God (Oyster Bay, New York)
- Coordinates: 40°52′19.78″N 73°32′4.06″W

Architecture
- Type: church

Specifications
- Direction of façade: north
- Materials: wood

Website
- North Shore Assembly of God, Oyster Bay, NY

Wightman Memorial Baptist Church in Oyster Bay, New York, was first built in 1908. It is the third building on this site. The first Baptist congregation met in Oyster Bay as early as 1700, and Oyster Bay received its first ordained minister in 1724. The second church building, constructed in 1806 is still visible on the site, behind the newer structure.

== History ==
This graceful structure with its unique carriage porch and conical bay windows is of special significance to the Oyster Bay Historical Society. The Society's home is a house museum on Summit Street called the Earle-Wightman House. It is named after two of its most famous residents Reverend Marmaduke Earle who came to Oyster Bay in 1801, and Reverend Charles Wightman who began his ministry here in 1868.

Both men were pastors of this church when it had a Baptist congregation, and both served for over 55 years. Mr. Earle, who lived from 1769 to 1856, was also the principal of the Oyster Bay Academy at its founding in 1801. The Baptist congregation first began meeting in Oyster Bay as early as 1700; it is the oldest Baptist congregation in the State of New York. One of the earliest pastors Robert Feeks, had the distinction of becoming the first ordained minister in Oyster Bay in 1724. The original building on this site no longer exists; it was a plain unpainted wood-frame structure with flat planked pews and a small pulpit.

During the American Revolutionary War it was reportedly used to quarter occupying British troops, as were many other churches in the village. The congregation grew steadily and in 1806 a larger church was built on this site. You can still see that second church; in 1882 it was moved back and rotated 90 degrees to make room for the new church. In 1908, after many years of fundraising the church you see today was completed. The second church was then used as a Pentecostal church school, with some students living on campus in the building facing Orchard Street. Since the early 1980s the North Shore Assembly of God has made this their home, and have preserved the interior with all its original details including richly carved pews and woodwork, ornate pressed tin ceilings and walls, a built-in pipe organ, and many lovely original stained glass windows.

== See also ==
- Oyster Bay History Walk
- List of Town of Oyster Bay Landmarks
- National Register of Historic Places listings in Nassau County, New York
