= Hood A.M.E. Zion Church =

Church in Oyster Bay, United States

Coordinates: 40°52′16.25″N 73°31′51.29″W

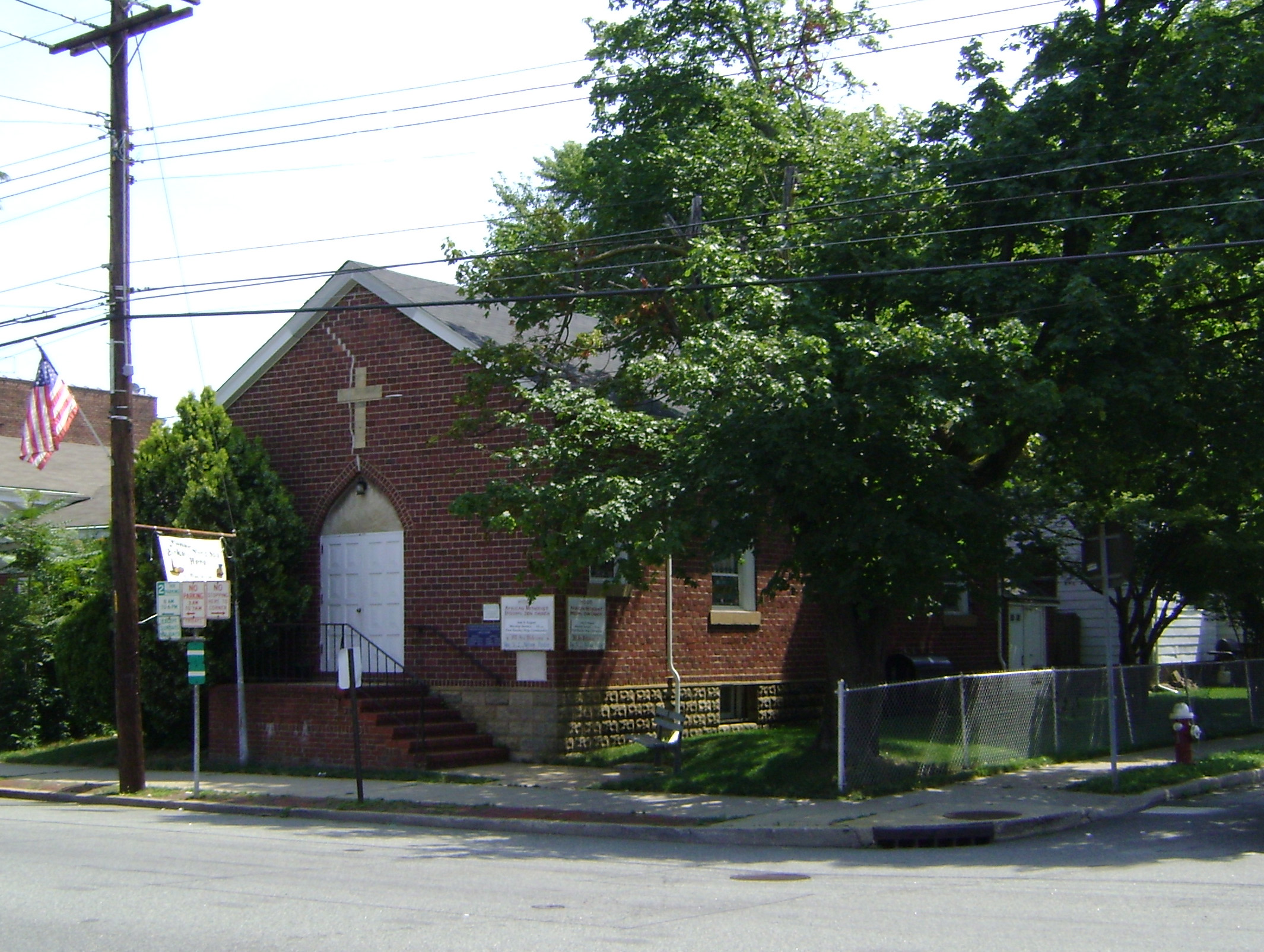
Photo of Hood A.M.E. Zion Church, 2008

Hood African Methodist Episcopal Zion Church, founded in 1848, is an historic African Methodist Episcopal Zion church located in Oyster Bay, New York. It is the oldest continuous congregation holding services in its original church structure in Oyster Bay. A small wood-frame building was constructed on this site in 1856. Later, the church was renamed to honor an early bishop, the Right Reverend James Walker Hood. In 1937, the wooden church was covered with the brick exterior you see today. From 1937 to 1963, the pastor was Reverend Moses T. Smith. Today, the congregation is led by Pastor Jarod B. Morris, who was appointed to the Pastoral charge on June 14th, 2026.

== History ==
Many local churches have built multiple buildings on their same site over the course of centuries but this brick church, the Hood African Methodist Episcopal Zion Church, is the oldest continuous congregation still holding services in its original church structure in Oyster Bay. When a group of African American families were trying to organize a church in 1848, Edward Weekes gave them this plot of land. They built a small wood-frame building in 1856 and called themselves the First African Methodist Episcopal Zion Church. Later, to honor an early bishop, the Right Reverend James Walker Hood, they changed their name to the Hood AME Zion Church.

The original congregation was small and faced hard financial times as they struggled to keep a parson. During some periods they simply had to worship without one. But they persevered, and in 1884 received some more help from the Weeks family; John Abeel Weeks gave them a plot of land in Pine Hollow for a cemetery.

To help ends meet they held many fundraisers such as fairs and concerts but still most pastor could only stay a few months at a time. One pastor in the 1890s Reverend John LaChia used the stage at Fleets Hall to hold regular concerts coupled with Chowder Suppers. With the proceeds, they hoped to build a parsonage. Enough funds were raised to build a foundation but no more.

Another pastor, Reverend James Gaskill, brought together a coalition of Oyster Bay Church leaders to give support to the fundraising effort. Their help was augmented by contributions from leading Oyster Bay families and within a year the parsonage was built, and electrical lights added in the church. In 1937 the wooden church was covered with the brick exterior you see today. Today, Oyster Bay's oldest congregation continuously holding services in the same building is led by Pastor Jarod B. Morris.

== See also ==
- Oyster Bay History Walk
- List of Town of Oyster Bay Landmarks
- National Register of Historic Places listings in Nassau County, New York
