= Derby-Hall Bandstand =

Replica of Bandstand

Coordinates: 40°52′25.27″N 73°31′57.98″W

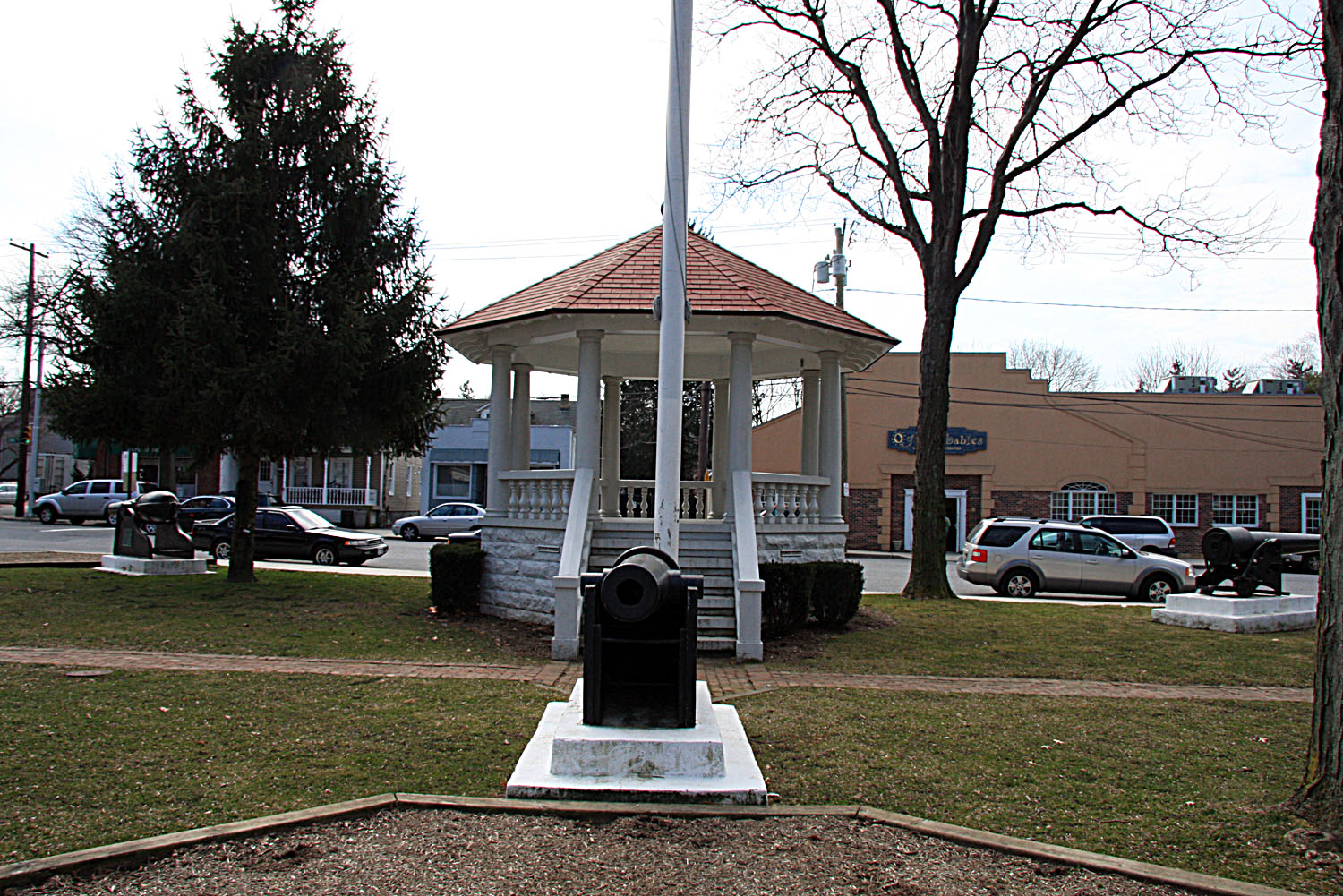
Photo of the Derby-Hall Bandstand, 2008

Derby-Hall Bandstand is a replica of the bandstand which stood on this site in Oyster Bay, New York, United States, and was used by President Theodore Roosevelt and others to give public speeches. The original bandstand was taken down in the 1930s and replaced by a replica in 1981. The location is a featured site on the Oyster Bay History Walk audio walking tour.

== History ==
The original Derby-Hall Bandstand was used by President Theodore Roosevelt and others to give public speeches. The construction was taken down in the 1930s, and in 1981 a replica took its place to serve as a new platform for public speakers and a gathering place in the heart of the village.

Originally it was to be dedicated solely to the memory of Theodore Roosevelt's daughter Ethel Roosevelt Derby. Her godson, Oyster Bay native Leonard Wood Hall, a New York Congressman who also served as chairman of the Republican National Committee during the 1950s, was the principal organizer of the efforts to build the bandstand in her name. When he, too, died before it was completed, it was dedicated to both of them.

The view from the bandstand shows two buildings which are almost mirror images; Town Hall and the U.S. Post Office. Old-timers may remember when the site of Town Hall East used to be the Lyric Theatre, where generations of Oyster Bay residents fell in love with the movies.

Three cannons surround the bandstand, each with a unique history.

The cannon facing Town Hall has on its base a tablet, cast from metal recovered from the wreckage of the USS Maine, which was destroyed in Havana Harbor on February 15, 1898. Two hundred and sixty six men lost their lives when more than live tons of powder charges exploded completely destroying the forward third of the ship. Although most historians now agree that the explosion was accidental, tensions in the aftermath of the disaster contributed to America's decision to begin the Spanish–American War of 1898.

The cannon itself is a Civil War era Dahlgren gun, named for its inventor Rear Admiral John A. Dahlgren. This gun, with its unique "soda bottle" shaped barrel, was manufactured in many sizes and became the standard weapon on Union Naval vessels after 1856.

The cannon at the foot of the gazebo stairs is a circa 1861 Civil War trophy gun from the USS R.R. Cuyler. The R.R. Cuyler was a 1202-ton wooden steamship chartered by the Union Navy to enforce a blockade of Florida's west coast. This 30 pound Parrott gun weighs 3,510 pounds (1,590 kg). It was presented to Oyster Bay by the Navy and unveiled by President Theodore Roosevelt in 1903.

== See also ==
- Oyster Bay History Walk
- List of Town of Oyster Bay Landmarks
- National Register of Historic Places listings in Nassau County, New York
