= Seely/Wright House =

Seely-Wright House
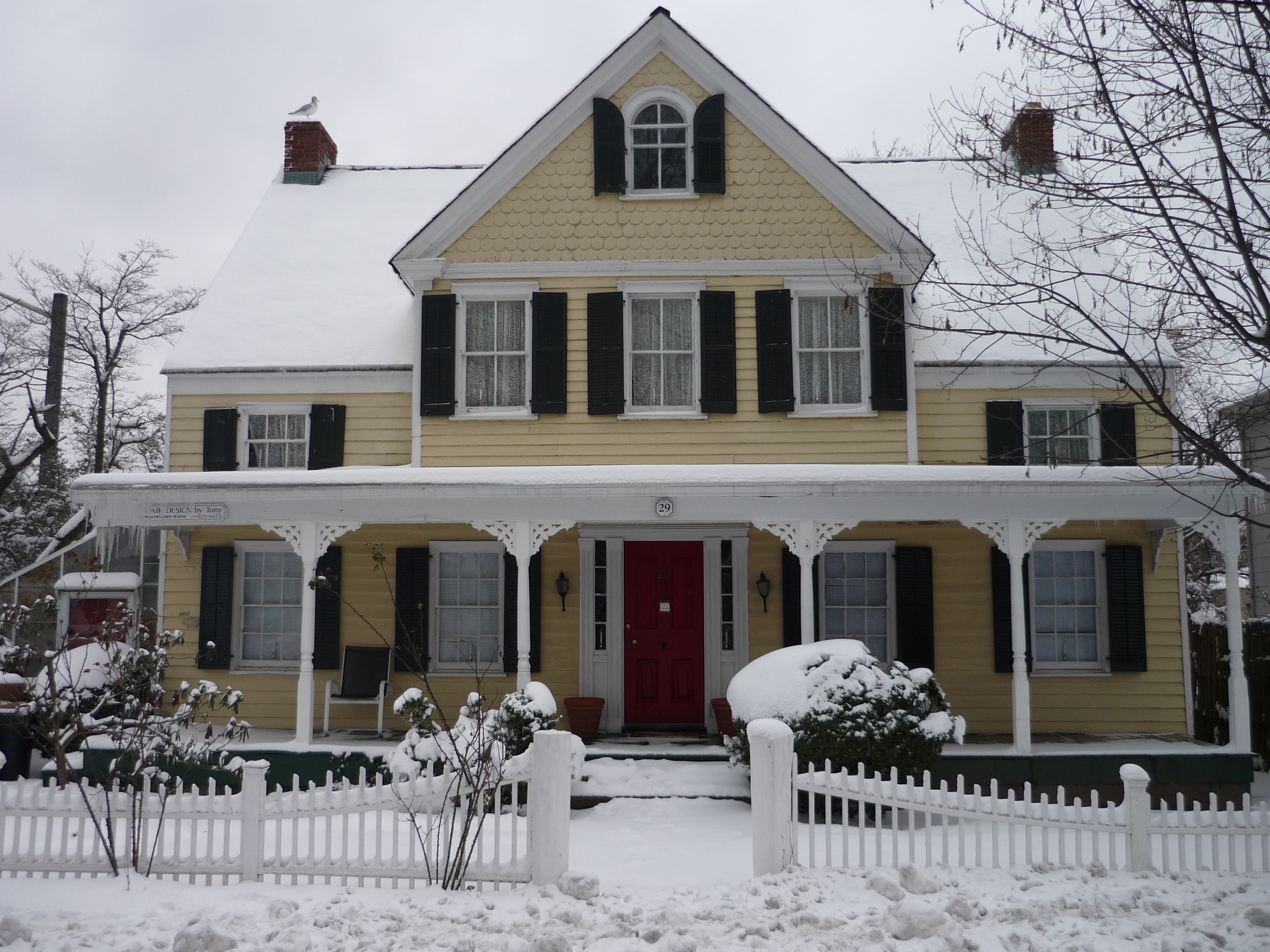
- Seely-Wright House in 2008

- Location within New York
- 40°52′19.37″N 73°31′54.73″W
- Location: 29 West Main Street, Oyster Bay, New York

History
- Built: 1830
- Built for: Dr. Ebenezer Seely

Oyster Bay Landmark
- Official name: Seely-Wright House (The Country Lady)
- Designated: August 7, 2001

The Seely/Wright House is a historic house on West Main Street in Oyster Bay, New York. The house was built in 1830 by Dr. Ebeneezer Seely who married Phebe Townsend in 1808. Phebe was daughter of noted Oyster Bay resident Samuel Townsend, who for more than thirty years served as a magistrate and member of the provincial congress of 1774–1777 that framed the constitution of New York State. A legend persists that President Martin Van Buren was once entertained here. Today the house is a Town of Oyster Bay Landmark and a featured site on the Oyster Bay History Walk audio walking tour.

== History ==
This house, which has been called both the Seeley House and the Wright House, is situated right across the street from Raynham Hall with good reason. It was built in 1830 for Dr. Ebenezer Seely, who had married Phebe Townsend in 1808. Phebe was born and raised in Raynham Hall and lived much of her adult life there as well. She was the youngest daughter of Samuel Townsend and Sarah Townsend and was only 15 years old when the commander of the Queen's Rangers occupied her home during the Revolutionary War.

She married Dr. Seely quite late in life when she was 45 and he was 26, almost 20 years her junior. During his life Dr. Seely, besides being a physician, was also a prominent businessman and public official, serving as Town Supervisor of Oyster Bay, School Commissioner, School Inspector, and moderator at many town meetings.

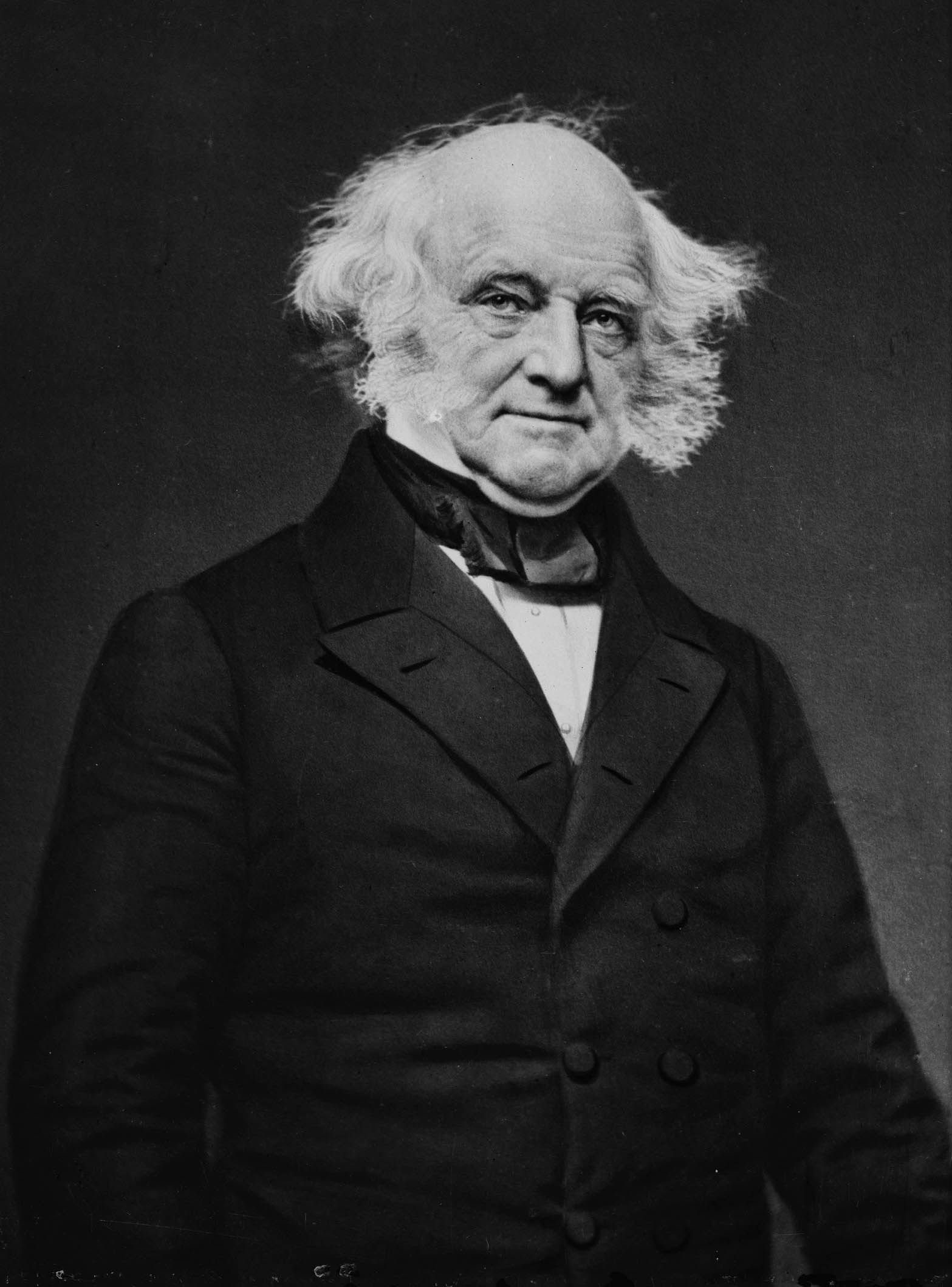
Photo of President Martin Van Buren

An interesting legend persists that Dr. Seely knew President Martin Van Buren, and that the 8th President of the United States was once entertained here.

His wife Phebe only lived in this house for 11 years. She died in 1841 at age 78, and was buried in the Townsend Cemetery on Fort Hill which you can also visit on this tour. Dr. Seely married Rebecca Summers the following year, who was, coincidentally, 20 years his junior. Their daughter Catharine Seely married Joseph B. Wright, a blacksmith, and members of the Wright family lived here for many years after that.

Today this building is featured on the Oyster Bay History Walk, an audio walking tour produced by the nonprofit Oyster Bay Main Street Association.

No history of Oyster Bay would be complete without mention of the Wright family, often called the "first family" of Oyster Bay. In 1653 Captain John Dickerson sailed the sloop Desire to Oyster Bay with Peter Wright, Samuel Mayo and William Levering who negotiated the purchase of the "Town Spot" from the Matinecock Indians. This "Town Spot" is the land which includes most of the Hamlet of Oyster Bay. Although Europeans had settled here before that date, it is this first land purchase in 1653 which is often referred to as the "founding of Oyster Bay."

The Wright family also occupied a beautiful house which still stands on West Main Street, the earliest portions of which William Wright built in 1705. Another Wright house, the Job Wright House, circa 1667, used to stand on South Street, and was for many years the oldest house in Oyster Bay. In 1948 this building, which had stood for over 280 years, was torn down to make way for the entrance to a parking lot.

== See also ==
- Oyster Bay History Walk
- List of Town of Oyster Bay Landmarks
- National Register of Historic Places listings in Nassau County, New York
