= WaterFront Center =

US non-profit organization

Coordinates: 40°52′32.81″N 73°32′23.07″W

The WaterFront Center is non-profit organization located in Oyster Bay, New York. The organization provides access to the waters of Oyster Bay Harbor and the Long Island Sound

== History ==
In the late 1980’s a real estate development proposal threatened the former Jakobson Shipyard on the shoreline of Oyster Bay. Concerned about the impact this development would have on Oyster Bay Harbor, not-for-profit group Friends of the Bay along with elected officials including State Senator Ralph Marino and former State Senator Carl Marcellino lead a campaign that outlined the development of a Community Environmental and Marine Education Center. The plan was approved in 1998 and in 2000 the WaterFront Center was established.

== Oyster Sloop Christeen ==
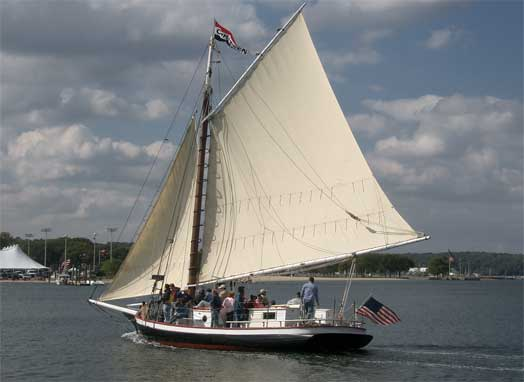
Photo of Christeen, 2008

Christeen, a 38-foot gaff-rigged sloop, is the oldest oyster sloop in America and a National Historic Landmark. She was originally built in 1883 for Captain William Smith in Glenwood Landing, New York for harvesting oysters in Oyster Bay and Cold Spring Harbor.

Over her 125 years, Christeen served not only as an oyster dredge but also as a cargo carrier and live-aboard between Connecticut, New York, and New Jersey. Christeen was added to the National Register of Historic Places on December 4, 1991. After surviving 16 major hurricanes, numerous nor’easters, two sinkings, and severe neglect, Christeen was returned home to Oyster Bay in 1992. A dedicated group of volunteers worked on the restoration of Christeen—working alongside a full-time shipwright and raising more than $300,000.

Christeen was completely restored and launched in 1999. Christeen’s new mission is to serve as a floating classroom for The WaterFront Center. Her Coast Guard Certified Captains and experienced crew educate up to 24 passengers about maritime history, marine science, coastal ecology, the oyster industry, and aquaculture.

== See also ==
- Oyster Bay History Walk
- List of Town of Oyster Bay Landmarks
- National Register of Historic Places listings in Nassau County, New York
