= Snouder's Drug Store =

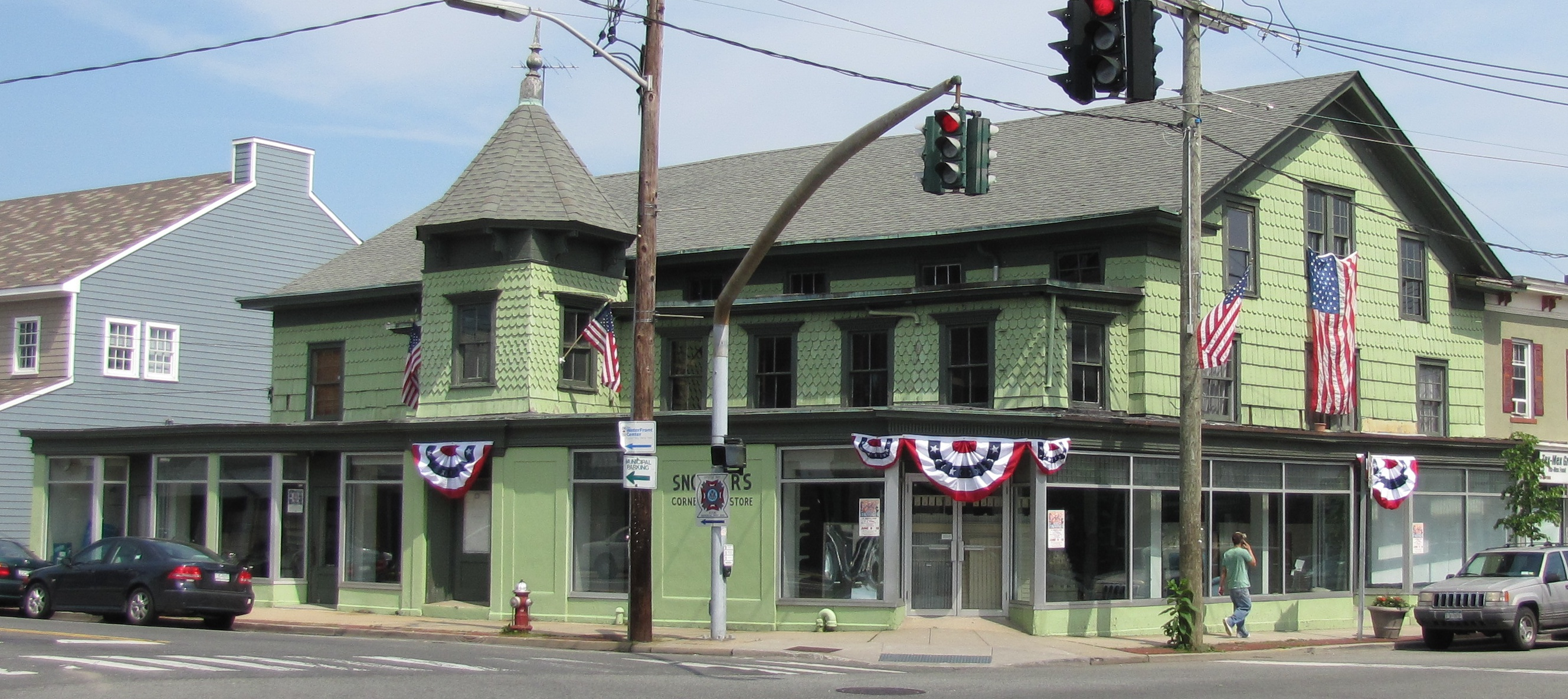
Snouder's Corner Drug Store May 2011.

Snouder's Drug Store was the oldest operating business in Oyster Bay, New York. The store was first established in 1884. The first telephone in Oyster Bay was installed here, and for several years it remained the only one in town. When Theodore Roosevelt became Governor of New York State and later President, the press corps gathered at Snouder's to transmit news from Oyster Bay. Phone service and the soda fountain installed in 1889 made Snouder's one of the most popular gathering places in town. In the 1990s the exterior was returned to its original color, which was determined through paint chip analysis. The building is a Town of Oyster Bay Landmark and was a featured site on the Oyster Bay History Walk audio walking tour.

== History ==
It is uncertain how early the first building was erected on this site but evidence exists that dating it back to the late 17th century. Snouder's Drug Store, located here since 1884, was the oldest continuously operated business in Oyster Bay. The drug store was established by Abel Miller Conklin whose descendants were the founders of Miller Place in Suffolk County.

Conklin had been a druggist in York City, but moved to the countryside of Oyster Bay in 1880 on the advice of his doctor, who felt the fresh air would improve his health. His first drugstore there was somewhere along South Street, though the exact location is not known. In 1884 he relocated the drug store to its final location, and carried on his business with the help of his son-in-law, Andrew Snouder.

Andrew had left the clothing and shoe business to aid his ailing father-in-law. Despite the move, Abel Conklin's health did not recover. He soon died, leaving Andrew Snouder to carry on whilst initially keeping the name Conklin's Drug Store. In 1887 he installed a telephone, the very first in Oyster Bay, which for several years remained the only one in town. Until Theodore Roosevelt became president even Sagamore Hill did not have a telephone and for several years Mr. Snouder relayed messages for the future president.

The phone service became a key reason people gathered at Snouder's. In May, 1900 Andrew Snouder partitioned a part of the store for the exclusive use of telephone service. This enabled the switchboard operated by Miss Ellen Ludlam to remain open until the drugstore had closed late at night. That same year Andrew graduated second in his class from the New York College of Pharmacy and officially changed the name of the business to Snouder's Drug Store.

The telephone also brought many members of the press to the booths of Snouder's Drug Store, covering news of Theodore Roosevelt, both as Governor and President. Teenagers and children congregated here as well, both for the telephone service and the delicious refreshments after Mr. Snouder had a soda fountain installed in 1889. This soda fountain became a center of social life for several generations of kids, into the 1970s. In the 1990s the exterior was returned to its original color, which was determined through paint chip analysis.

After many decades Snouder's shut its doors in December, 2010. The building was at that time listed for sale by Long Island Realty Agents, Inc.

== See also ==
- Oyster Bay History Walk
- List of Town of Oyster Bay Landmarks
- National Register of Historic Places listings in Nassau County, New York
