= Earle-Wightman House =

Coordinates: 40°52′14.76″N 73°31′49.05″W

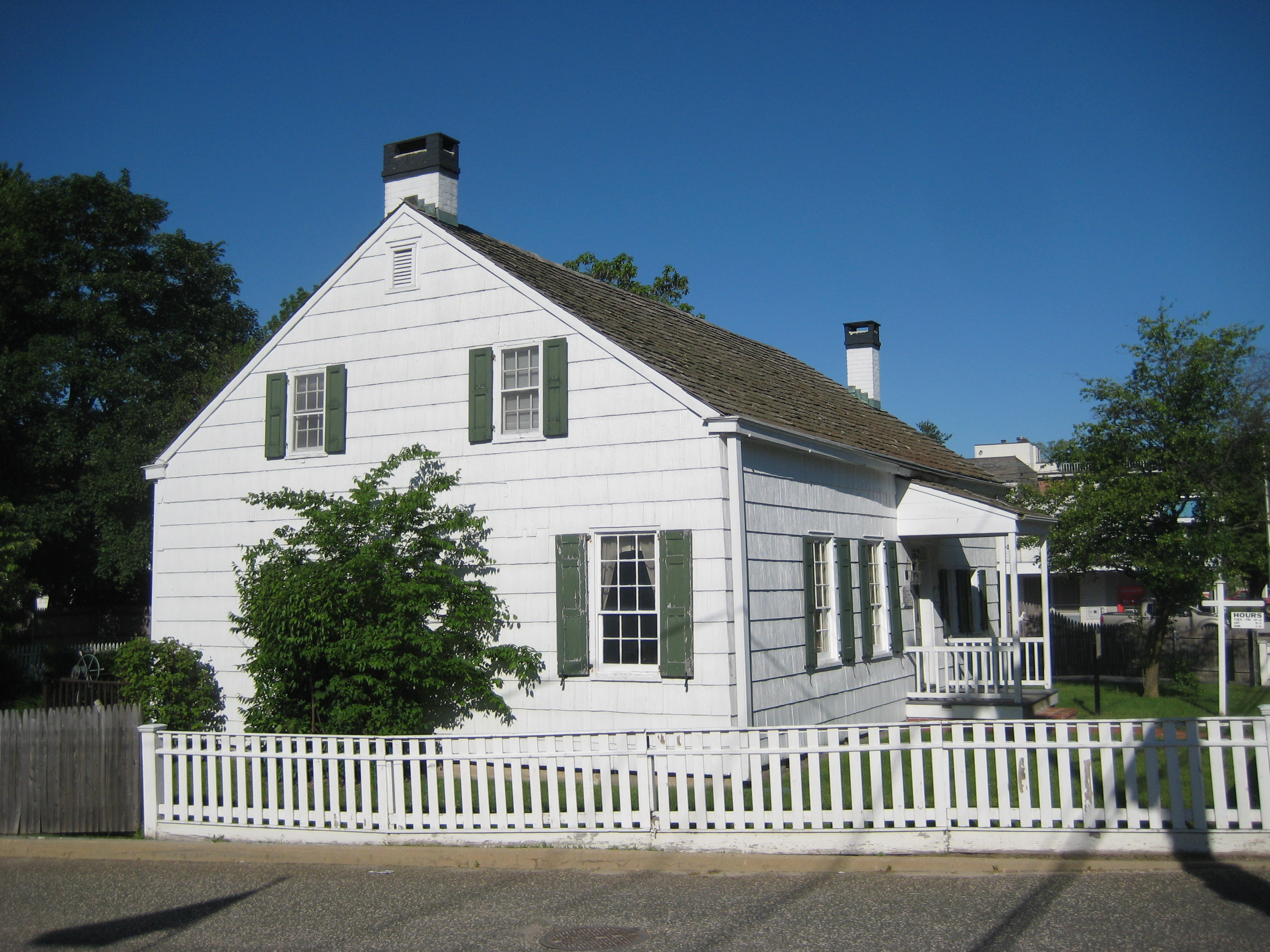
Photo of Earle-Wightman House, 2008

This house was originally built on South Street in Oyster Bay, New York, around 1720, as a small one-room dwelling. During the 19th century two successive Baptist ministers made their home here. The house was later moved from its location on South Street to 20 Summit Street. In 1966 the house was donated to the Town of Oyster Bay, for the use of the Oyster Bay Historical Society. The society operates the house as a museum, with two rooms interpreting the periods 1740 and 1830. Inside you can see how an 18th-century tradesman might have lived, then you can see how Rev. Earle entertained his 19th century guests in the parlor. An authentic recreation of an 18th-century garden is on the grounds behind the house. Today the house is a Town of Oyster Bay Landmark and a featured site on the Oyster Bay History Walk audio walking tour.

== History ==
The Earle-Wightman House is owned by the Town of Oyster Bay and operated by the Oyster Bay Historical Society as its headquarters, research library, and museum. The Society, a nonprofit organization, was founded in 1960 with the single purpose of preserving the history of the Oyster Bay community.

The house was originally built on South Street around 1720 as a small one-room dwelling. During that time the house had several owners. As the 19th century begun, two successive Baptist ministers, the Reverend Marmaduke Earle and the Reverend Charles S. Wightman (after whom the house is named), made their home here. In 1966 the house was donated to the Town for the Society's use by Bruce Wood Hall and was moved here to Summit Street.

The Society operates a museum, consisting of exhibition rooms interpreted to the periods 1740 and 1830.

Inside you can see how an 18th-century tradesman might have lived and worked with his wife and children in a one-room house.

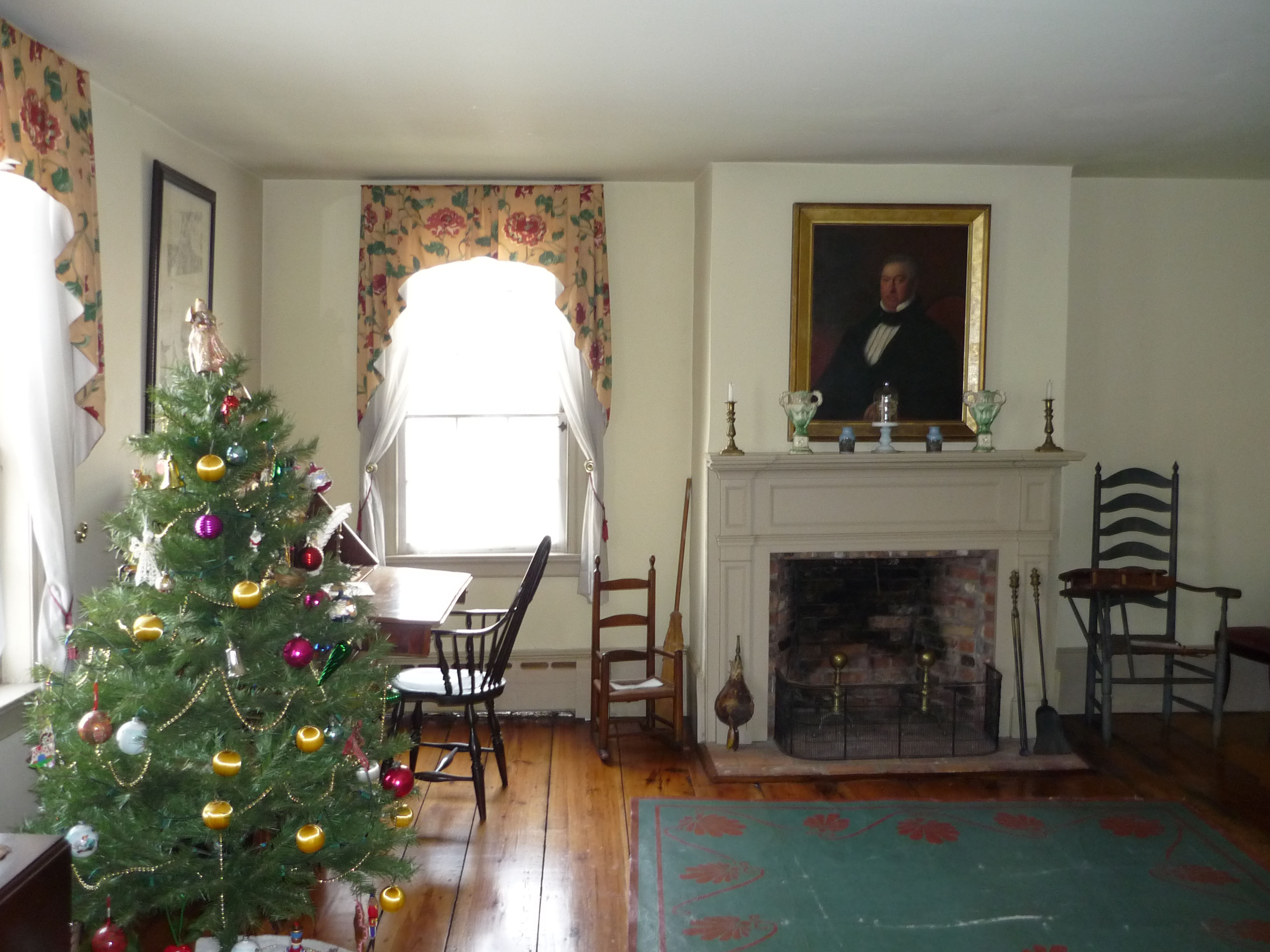
Nineteenth- century room, 2009

Then you can look in as Reverend Earle entertains his 19th-century guests in the parlor. The experience is further enhanced if you take time to stroll through the authentic 18th-century garden on the grounds behind the house.

It was restored by the North Country Garden Club and is maintained by their members. Like many gardens of the period it features not only ornamental plantings but herbs used for medicinal purposes, cooking, or for their fragrance.

The Oyster Bay Historical Society has provided visitors with exhibits and lectures as well as access to maps, and photographs, historical and genealogical documents for more than 40 years. Their Research Library contains over 750 volumes, 700 manuscripts, 1000 photographs, maps and documents as well as a fine genealogy collection. Their archives are also rich in materials relating to the military, maritime, and religious history of Oyster Bay.

Take time to tour the house and grounds and join the Oyster Bay Historical Society in their quest to preserve and celebrate the history of Oyster Bay.

== See also ==
- Oyster Bay History Walk
- List of Town of Oyster Bay Landmarks
- National Register of Historic Places listings in Nassau County, New York
