= New London Heritage Trail =

The New London Heritage Trail is a walk with 30 historic sites in New London, Connecticut. Each site has a bronze plaque set in the sidewalk, celebrating the rich history and important buildings in downtown New London. Following the plaques takes visitors on a tour from Colonial times to the early 20th century. Along the way, highlights include stories of Captain Bulkeley, who sailed with American Naval hero John Paul Jones, and buildings designed by several of America's greatest architects.

== New London Heritage Trail sites ==
- 165 State Street, Harris Building, 1885, by Leopold Eidlitz, born in Prague and educated at Viennese Polytechnic for Jonathan Newton Harris who made his fortune in patent medicine.
- 181 State Street, City Hall, 1856, built in the Italianate style. Completely redesigned and enlarged in 1911 in the Beaux arts style by local architect James Sweeney.
- 243 State Street, Lyric Hall, 1897. by New London architect James Sweeney. Originally built to house a theater, which later became a dance hall.
- 281 State Street, Mohican Hotel, 1897.
- 105-119 Huntington Street, Whale Oil Row, ca. 1835. Greek Revival styled homes built by prominent whaling captains. Legacy of wealth generated by New London whalers from 1820 to 1850.
- 310 State Street, Dewart Building, 1914, by New London architect of, 58 Bellevue Place, Dudley St. Clair Donnelly for Morton Freeman Plant, a railroad and steamship magnate of Groton.
- 290 State Street, Thames Club, 1905. Built in the Italian Roccoco architectural style. Originally a private men's club. The marquee side entrance overlooked an elegant garden.
- 250 State Street, National Bank of Commerce Building, 1922. The fifth bank to establish itself in the city relocated from the Crocker House into this Classic Green Revival style building.
- 180 State Street, The Crocker House, 1873. Opened on New Year's Eve as New London's first modern hotel. Patronized by U.S. presidents and playwright Eugene O'Neill.
- 158 State Street, Timothy Greens, 1771. Oldest building on State Street. Originally Timothy Green's print shop, which published one of the colony's earliest newspapers.
- 140 State Street, ca. 1873. Originally the site of L. Lewis Co., a crockery and glassware store. Local architect James Sweeney, designer of 143 and 181 State Street, had his offices here.
- 128 State Street, Bacon Marble Block, 1868.
- 80 State Street, Cronin Building, 1892.
- 54 State Street, The Marsh Building, 1916.
- 15 Bank Street, Lawrence Hall, 1920.
- 57 Bank Street, Royal Hotel, 1897.
- 111 Bank Street, Bulkeley House, 1790.
- 133 Bank Street, 1900.
- 181 Bank Street, 1790.
- 243 Bank Street, 1867.
- 258 Bank Street, 1833.
- 194 Bank Street, 1800.
- 150 Bank Street, U.S. Custom House, 1833.
- 138 Bank Street, Franklin Smith Home, 1840.
- 90 Bank Street, 1876.
- 74 Bank Street, Exchange Building, 1848.
- 42 Bank Street, 1833.
- 16 Bank Street, 1900.
- 58 Bellevue Place, Tudor Revival Custom House, 1902. By architect Dudley St. Clair Donnelly in New London, CT.
- 2 State Street, 1844.
- 35 Water Street, Union Railroad Station, 1888. by Henry Hobson Richardson, inventor of Romanesque Revival in America and architect of Trinity Church in Boston and Harvard University's Sever Hall.

== See also ==
- Freedom Trail
- Oyster Bay History Walk
