= Grace Church Complex (Massapequa, New York) =

Historic church in New York, United States

- U.S. National Register of Historic Places
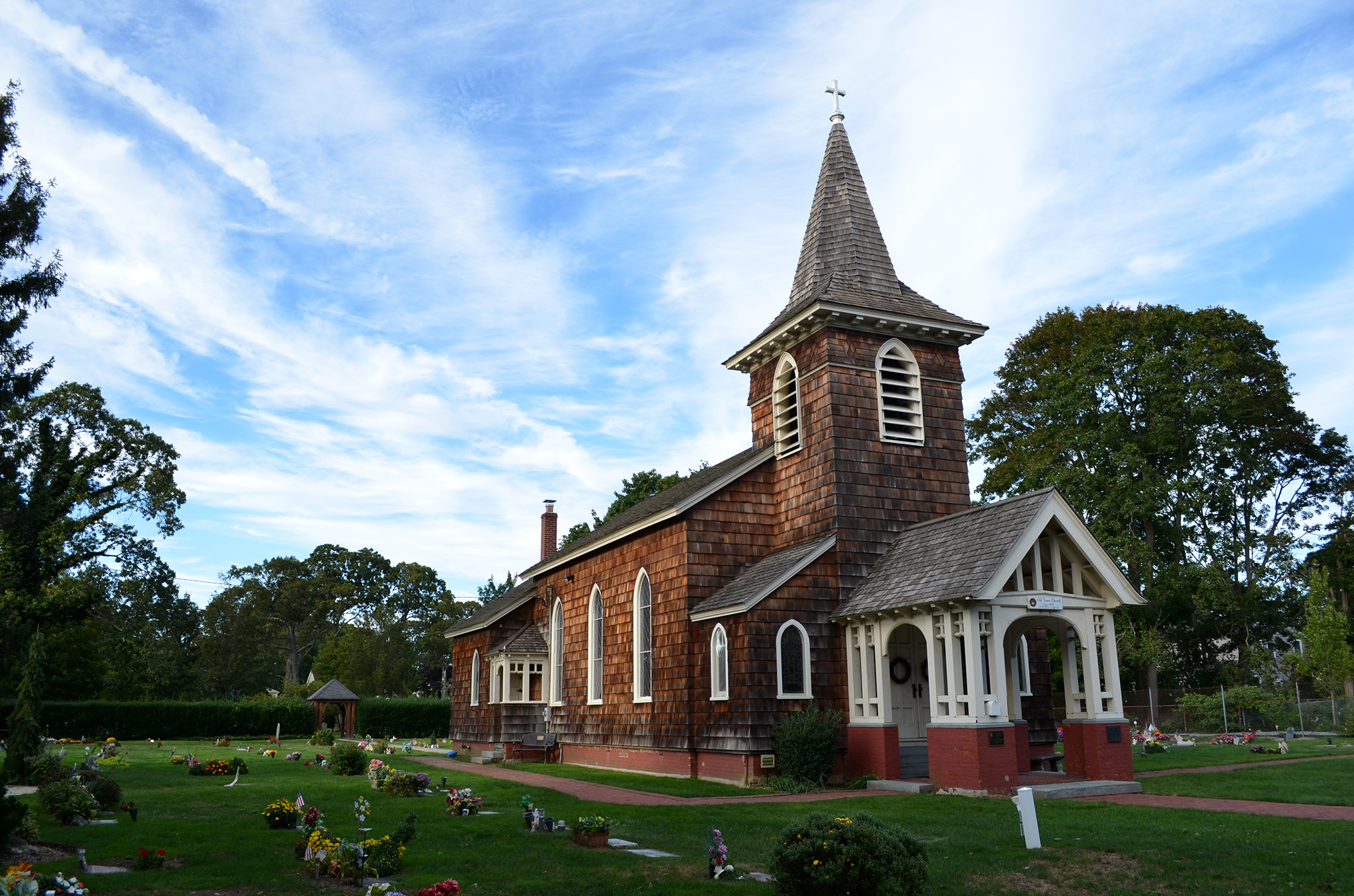
- Old Grace Church, September 2012

- Location within New York Location within the United States
- Location: Merrick and Dover Roads, Massapequa, New York
- Coordinates: 40°40′1″N 73°27′33″W
- Built: 1844
- Architect: Floyd, Elbert
- Architectural style: Gothic Revival
- NRHP reference No.: 83001713
- Added to NRHP: June 30, 1983

The Grace Church Complex is a historic Episcopal church complex in Massapequa, Nassau County, New York. The complex consists of the church, surrounding parish cemetery, the Floyd-Jones family cemetery, and the DeLancey Floyd-Jones Free Library. The small church was built in 1844 by Elbert Floyd-Jones and remodeled in 1905. It is a frame structure on a brick foundation and consists of a vestibule, nave, and chancel. It is in the Gothic Revival style and features a square bell tower with modest spire. The church also has Tiffany glass windows added during the remodeling. Sometime after 1983, the old Grace Church was given to the Historical Society of the Massapequas.

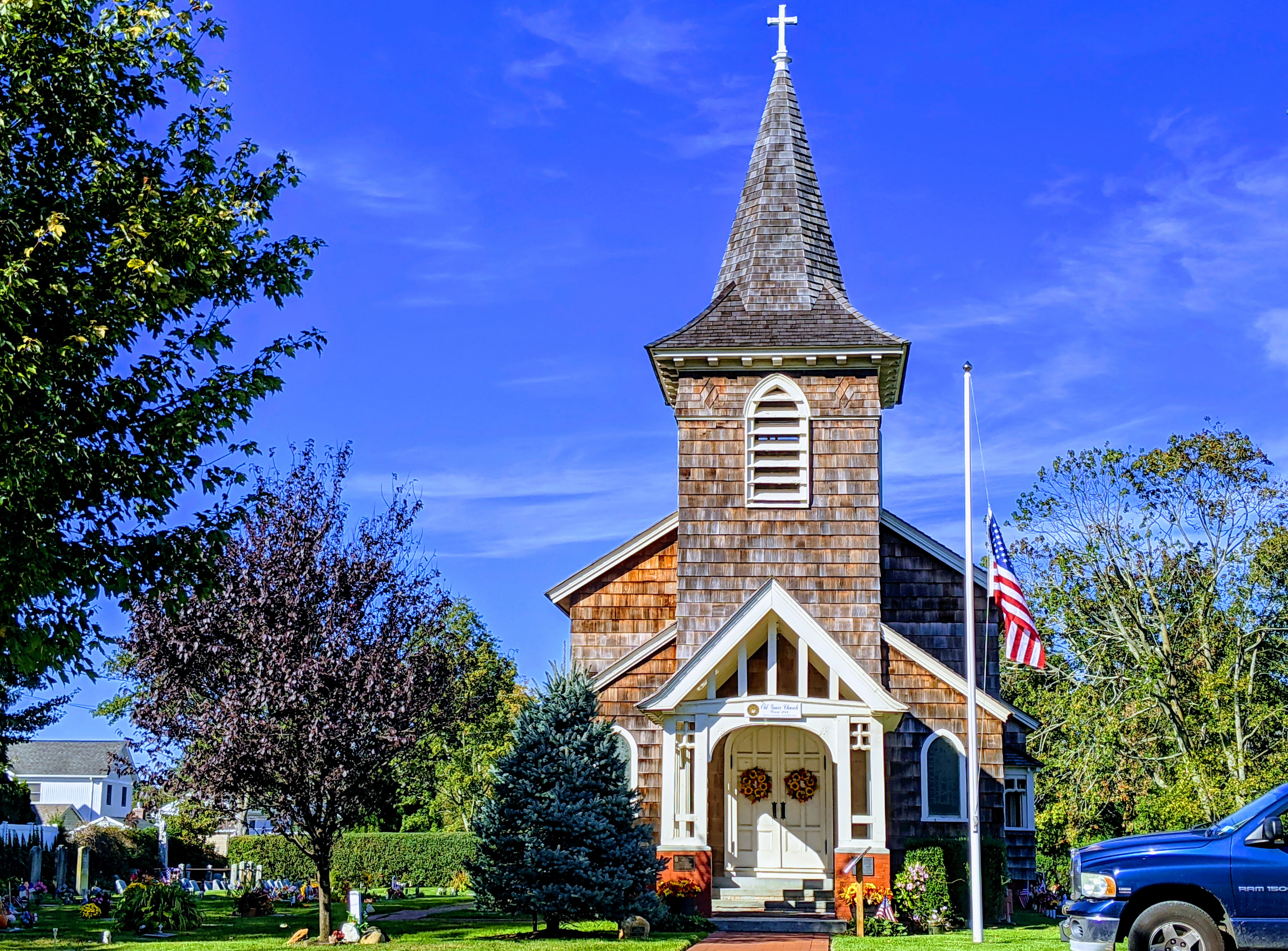
Old Grace Church and Historical complex

The DeLancey Floyd-Jones Free Library was built in 1896 and is a two-by-two-bay one-room structure that served as the only public library in Massapequa for 60 years. The library was founded and built by DeLancey Floyd-Jones (1826–1902). Initially, the library, which Col. Floyd-Jones gave to Massapequa along with an endowment, was open three days a week and had enough space on its shelves to accommodate up to 2,500 books.

It was listed on the National Register of Historic Places in 1983. It also includes three structures that are Oyster Bay municipal landmarks.

== In popular culture ==
- In the 2020 video game Omori, the inside of this church is used as the background for the Aubrey fight.
