= Schenck-Mann House =

Historic house in New York, United States

- U.S. National Register of Historic Places
- Location within New York Location within the United States
- Location: 222 Convent Rd., Syosset, New York
- Coordinates: 40°49′19″N 73°29′25″W
- Area: 3.3 acres (1.3 ha)
- Built: c. 1700
- Architectural style: Colonial, Post Medieval English
- NRHP reference No.: 05000089
- Added to NRHP: February 24, 2005

Schenck-Mann House is a historic home located at Syosset in Nassau County, New York. It is a 1 1/2-story, five-bay-wide timber-framed residence with a wood shingle gable roof and rectangular plan. The western three bays were built about 1700. The house was extensively renovated during the 1940s after a period of abandonment.

It was listed on the National Register of Historic Places in 2005.
