= List of Town of Oyster Bay Landmarks =

"Town of Oyster Bay Landmark" is a designation of the Town of Oyster Bay for buildings and other sites in the Town of Oyster Bay, New York. Listed sites are selected after meeting a combination of criteria, including historical, economic, architectural, artistic, cultural, and social values. Once a site is designated as a landmark, it is subject to the Town of Oyster Bay Landmarks Ordinance, which requires that any alterations beyond routine maintenance, up to and including demolition, must have their permit reviewed by the Landmarks Commission. Many Town of Oyster Bay Landmarks also are listed on the National Register of Historic Places, providing federal tax support for preservation.

== Listings town-wide ==
Below is a list of the 40 current landmarks in the Town of Oyster Bay. Dates of landmark designation and street addresses are as given by the town's register of landmarks.

	Landmark name	Image	Date designated	Location	City or Town	Summary
1	Schenck-Mann House		May 11, 1976	222 Convent Rd.	Syosset	
2	Albertson-Meyer House		May 11, 1976	153 E. Main St.	Oyster Bay	
3	Mill Pond House		May 11, 1976	1065 W. Shore Dr.	Oyster Bay	
4	Weeks Wilson House		May 11, 1976	53 East Main St.	Oyster Bay	
5	William Wright House		May 11, 1976	104 West Main St.	Oyster Bay	
6	Raynham Hall		May 11, 1976	20 West Main Street; 40°52′20.21″N 73°31′53.83″W	Oyster Bay	
7	Earle-Wightman House		May 11, 1976	20 Summit St. 40°52′14.76″N 73°31′49.05″W	Oyster Bay	
8	Old Grace Church		May 11, 1976	4750 Merrick Rd.	Massapequa	Part of the NRHP-listed Grace Church Complex
9	Adam-Derby House		February 6, 1979	34 Derby Court	Oyster Bay	
10	Minor House		October 9, 1979	78 Harbor Road	Oyster Bay	
11	Serpe House		October 9, 1979	69 Cedar Shore Dr.	Massapequa	
12	White Spots		October 9, 1979	193 Buckram Rd.	Locust Valley	
13	Richard Davis Store		October 7, 1980	7 Oyster Bay Rd.	Locust Valley	
14	A. Birmingham/Wilbury		April 28, 1982	143 Berry Hill Rd.	Syosset	
15	Cock-Valentine House		April 28, 1982	173 Buckram Rd.	Locust Valley	
16	Craft Mansion		April 28, 1982	18 Central Drive	Glen Head	
17	Horton House		April 26, 1983	72 Horton Place	Syosset	
18	70 East Main Street		April 26, 1983	70 East Main Street	Oyster Bay	
19	107 Eden Avenue		April 26, 1983	107 Eden Ave.	Massapequa Park	
20	Crickett Cottage		September 11, 1984	65 Sandy Hill Road	Oyster Bay	
21	Moore's Building		November 26, 1985	5 East Main Street; 40°52′21.7″N 73°31′49.18″W	Oyster Bay	
22	Snouder's Drug Store		March 10, 1987	108 South Street; 40°52′20.18″N 73°31′51.29″W	Oyster Bay	
23	Matinecock Lodge		March 10, 1987	14 West Main Street	Oyster Bay	Destroyed by fire. Recommended for de-listing.
24	The Printery		March 10, 1987	43 West Main Street; 40°52′19.68″N 73°31′56.89″W	Oyster Bay	
25	Visiting Nurse Association		May 5, 1987	193 South Street	Oyster Bay	
26	St. Gregory Nyssa Church		May 5, 1987	1100 Hicksville Rd.	Massapequa	
27	33 West Main Street		May 25, 1987	33 West Main Street	Oyster Bay	
28	Grace Church (Floyd Jones Servent Cottage)		February 23, 1988	4750 Merrick Rd.	Massapequa	Part of the NRHP-listed Grace Church Complex
29	Hawxhurst House		October 25, 1988	89 Oyster Bay Rd.	Locust Valley	
30	Jos. Weekes Jr. House		October 25, 1988	41 Oyster Bay Rd.	Locust Valley	
31	Will Rodgers House		February 6, 1990	425 Clocks Blvd.	East Massapequa	
32	Maria Powell House		January 19, 1993	12 Prospect Street	Oyster Bay	
33	John M. Sammis House		January 18, 1994	30 White Street	Oyster Bay	
34	Old Methodist Church		January 20, 1998	8025 Jericho Tpke	Woodbury	
35	Old Methodist Graveyard		January 20, 1998	8025 Jericho Tpke	Woodbury	
36	Oyster Bay Long Island Rail Road Station		March 2, 1999	Railroad Ave. 40°52′29.97″N 73°31′53.77″W	Oyster Bay	
37	Oyster Bay Long Island Rail Road Turntable		March 2, 1999	Railroad Ave. 40°52′29.76″N 73°31′42.95″W	Oyster Bay	
38	Floyd Jones Library - Massapequa		December 14, 1999		Massapequa	Part of the NRHP-listed Grace Church Complex
39	Ketchum/Underhill Farm House and Barn		June 12, 2001	300 Jericho Tpke.	Jericho	Demolished in 2017.
40	Seely-Wright House (The Country Lady)		August 7, 2001	29 West Main St. 40°52′19.37″N 73°31′54.73″W	Oyster Bay	

== Key ==
^{∞}	Oyster Bay town landmark
^{*}	Also listed on National Register of Historic Places

== See also ==
- Oyster Bay History Walk
- New York State Historic Markers, Nassau County, Town of Oyster Bay
- National Register of Historic Places listings in Nassau County, New York
- New York State Register of Historic Places
