= Oyster Bay History Walk =

Trail in New York

The Oyster Bay History Walk is a path through downtown Oyster Bay, New York that leads the walker to 30 historic sites. It is a 1-mile loop and is the first certified American Heart Association Start! Walking Path on Long Island.

== Origins and development ==
The first settlers arrived in Oyster Bay in the 1650s; the Town of Oyster Bay seal includes the date 1653. Over the ensuing 350 years several important events in the religious, military, and social history of Colonial America and the United States occurred there. A few of these events and the people associated with them are celebrated in the History Walk. Seven of the sites included on the History Walk are also listed on the National Register of Historic Places.

An audio commentary describing each of the sites on the Walk was originally released under the title Talk of the Town, but the name was changed to the Oyster Bay History Walk in 2008 at the time of certification by the American Heart Association as the first Start! Walking Path on Long Island.

== Sites on the Walk ==
Details of the locations of the site on the walk are available on the linked map.

=== 1. Introduction ===
The Walk starts at the Baykery Cafe with a general introduction to Oyster Bay and its history.

=== 2. Fleet's Hall ===
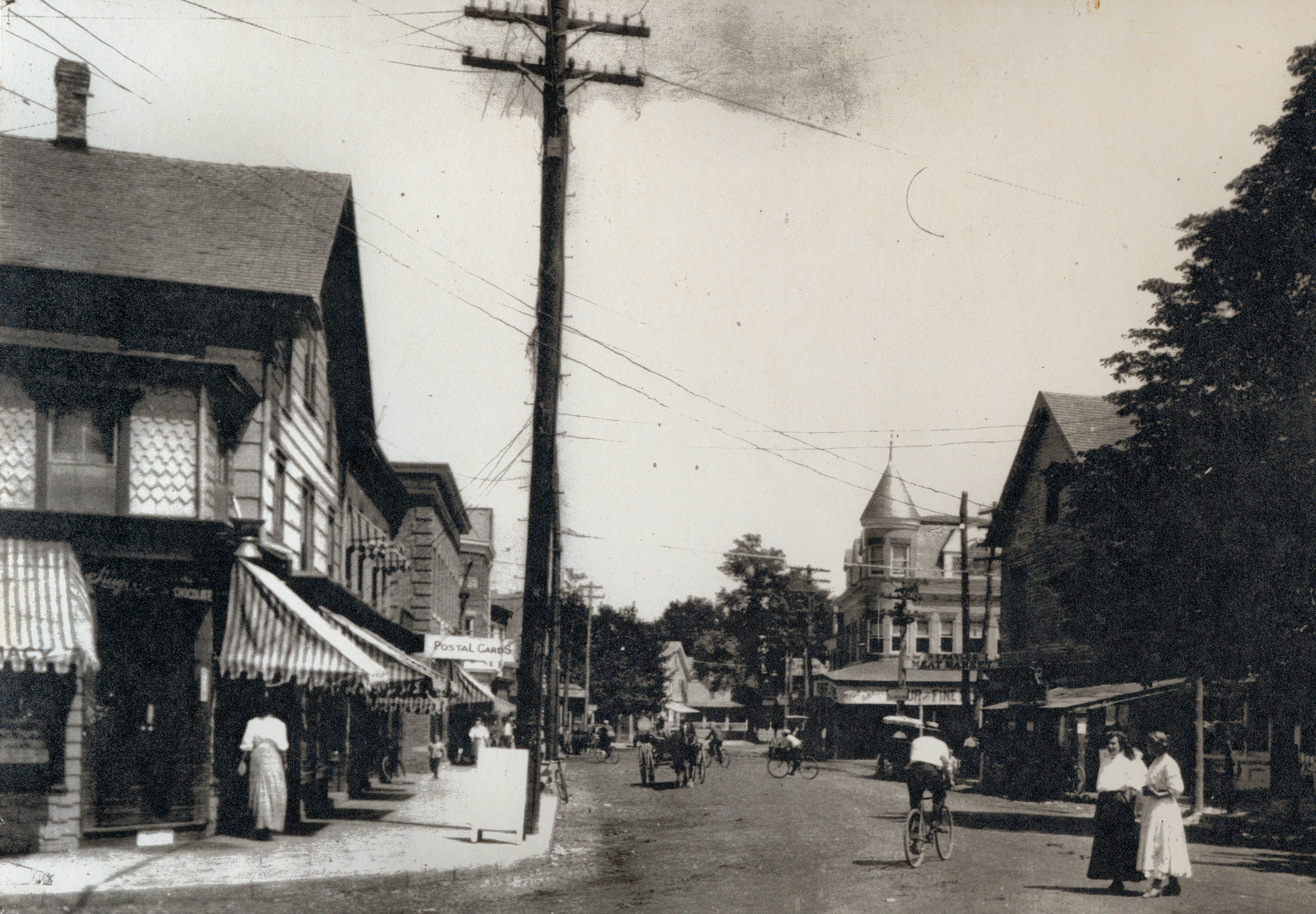
Oyster Bay ca. 1890. Snouder's Drug Store in left foreground, Moore's Building in right background, and Fleet's Hall to its right in foreground.

Fleet's Hall is a building that once stood in Oyster Bay, New York. The building served as an important civic and social meeting place during the time that Theodore Roosevelt was a resident of Oyster Bay and served as Governor of New York State and later President of the United States. The building was used for events such as public meetings, concerts, receptions, dances, and dinners. It was also the site of the first moving picture screening in Oyster Bay.

=== 3. Moore's Building ===
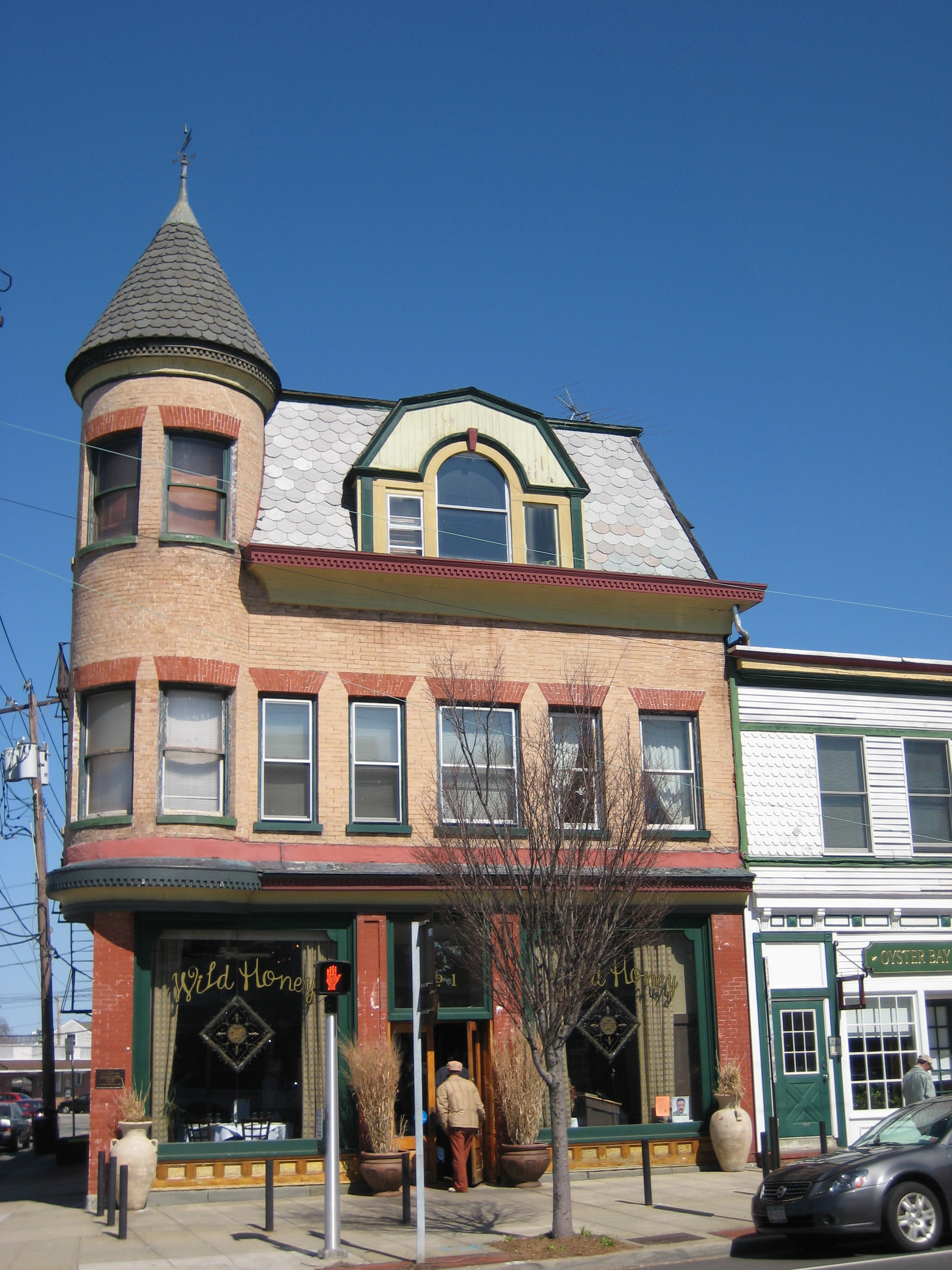
Moore's Building

=== 4. Oyster Bay Bank Building ===
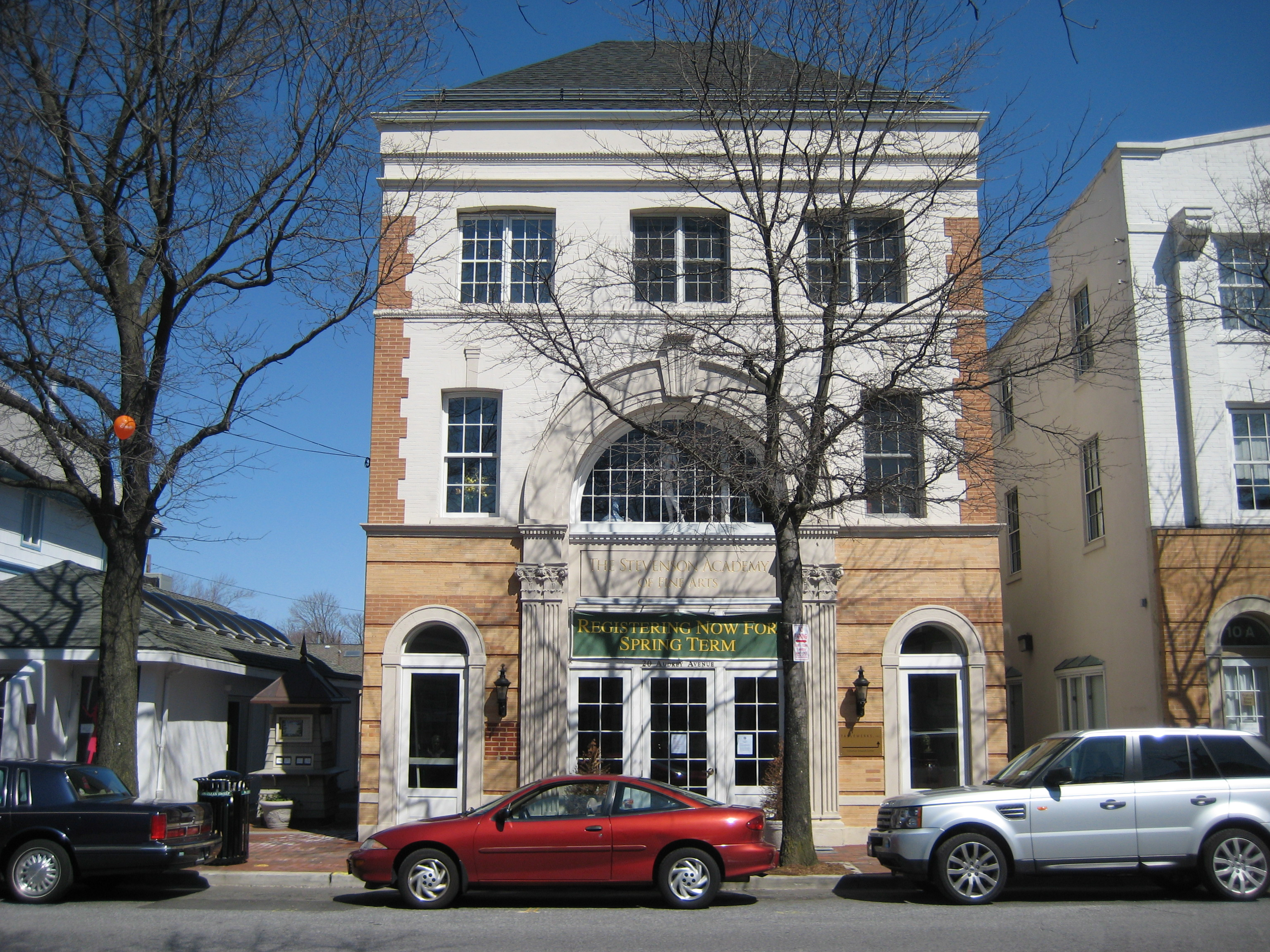
Oyster Bay Bank Building

=== 5. Derby-Hall Bandstand ===
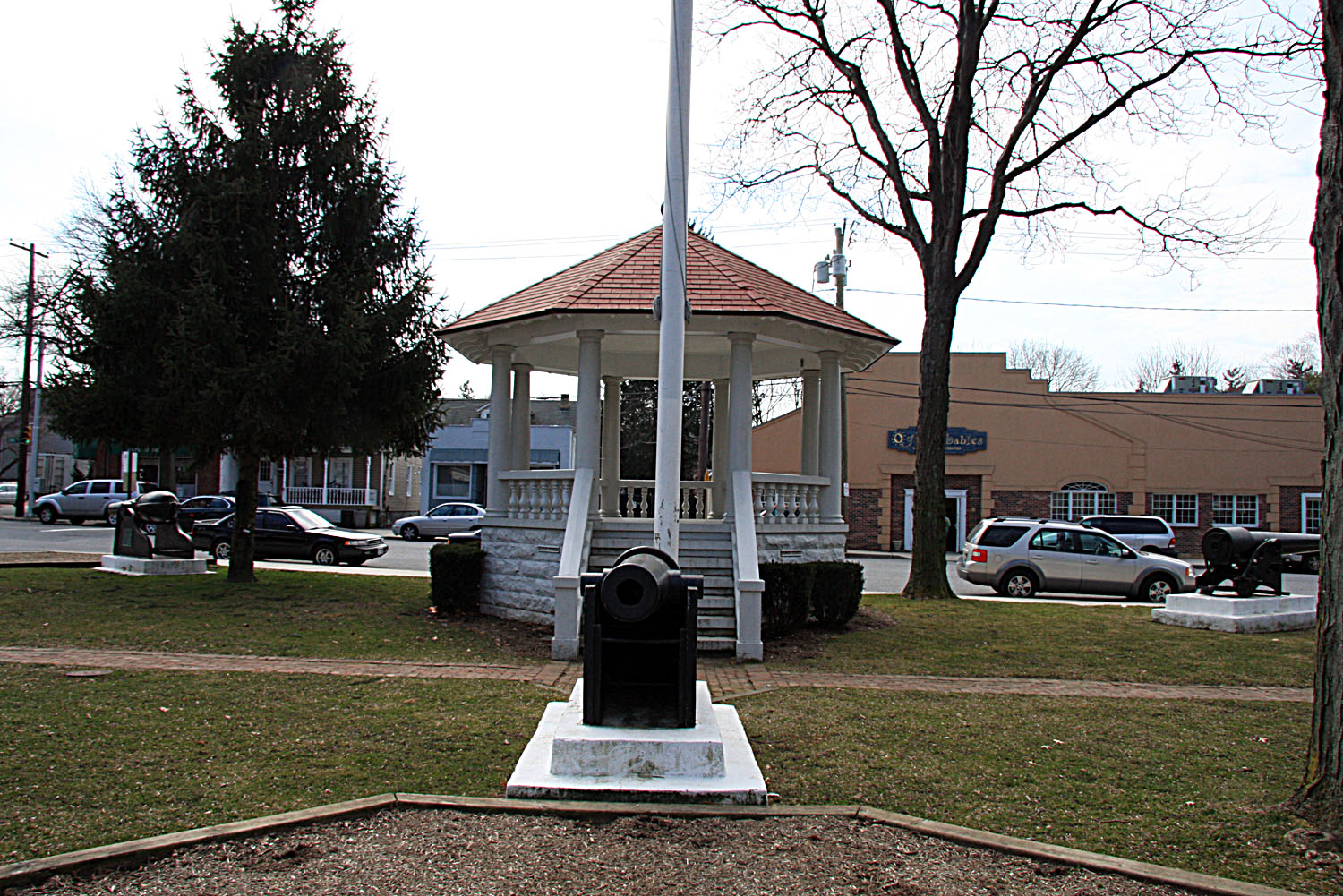
Derby-Hall Bandstand

=== 6. U.S. Post Office ===
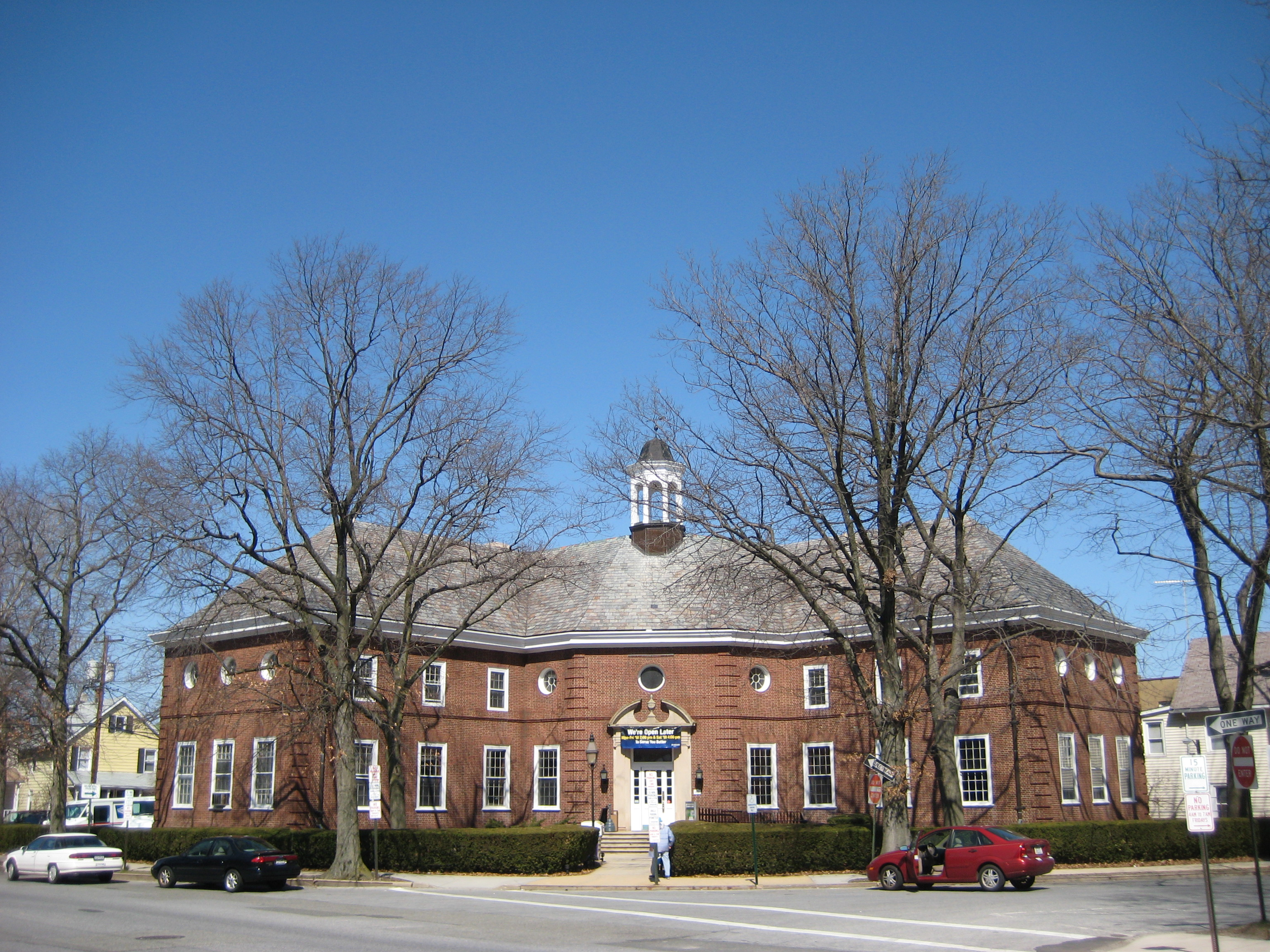
Post office

=== 7. Long Island Rail Road Station ===
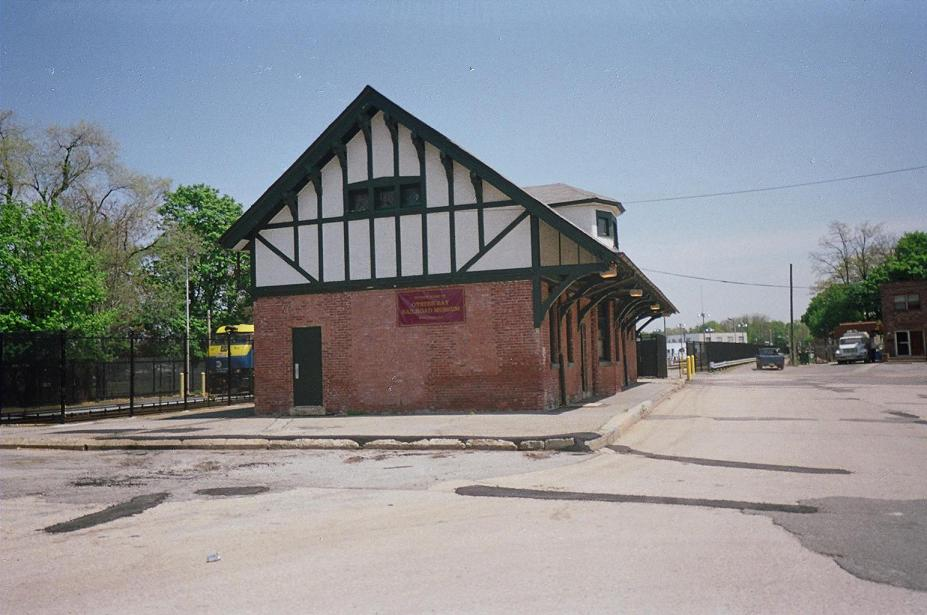
Oyster Bay LIRR station

=== 8. Theodore Roosevelt Memorial Park ===
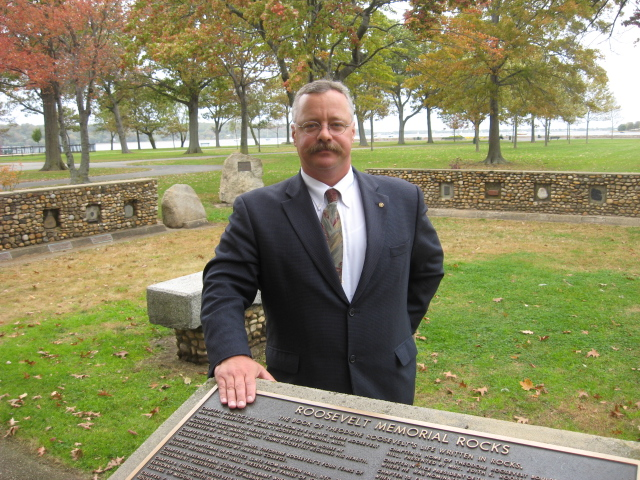
Theodore Roosevelt Memorial Park

=== 9. Oyster Bay Long Island Rail Road Turntable ===
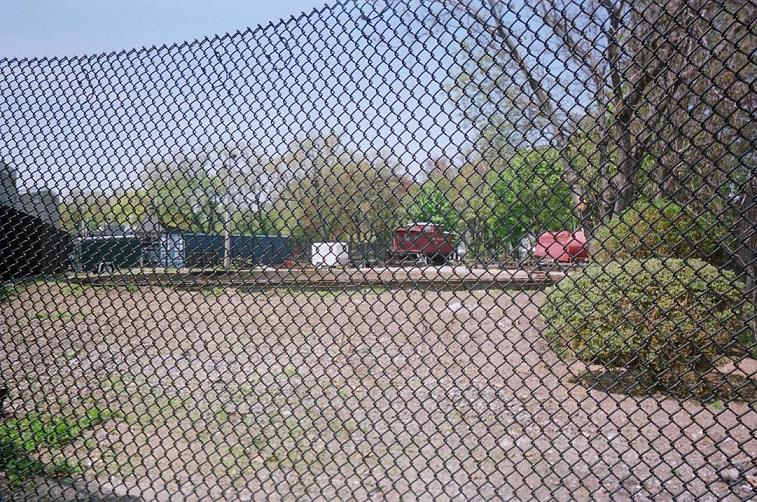
Turntable, beyond chain-link fence

=== 10. Waterfront Center ===
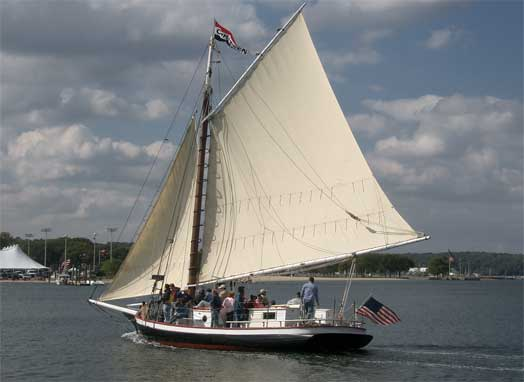
The Christeen is a sloop at the WaterFront Center

=== 11. Captain Kidd in Oyster Bay ===
Although Richard Coote, the Earl of Bellomont, had been instrumental in securing Kidd's commission as a privateer he later turned against Kidd and other pirates, writing that the inhabitants of Long Island were "a lawless and unruly people" protecting pirates who had "settled among them."

In an attempt to avoid his mutinous crew, who had gathered in New York, Kidd sailed 120 miles around the eastern tip of Long Island, and then doubled back 90 miles along the Sound to Oyster Bay. He felt this was a safer passage than the high-trafficked narrows between Staten Island and Brooklyn.

=== 12. Wightman Memorial Baptist Church ===
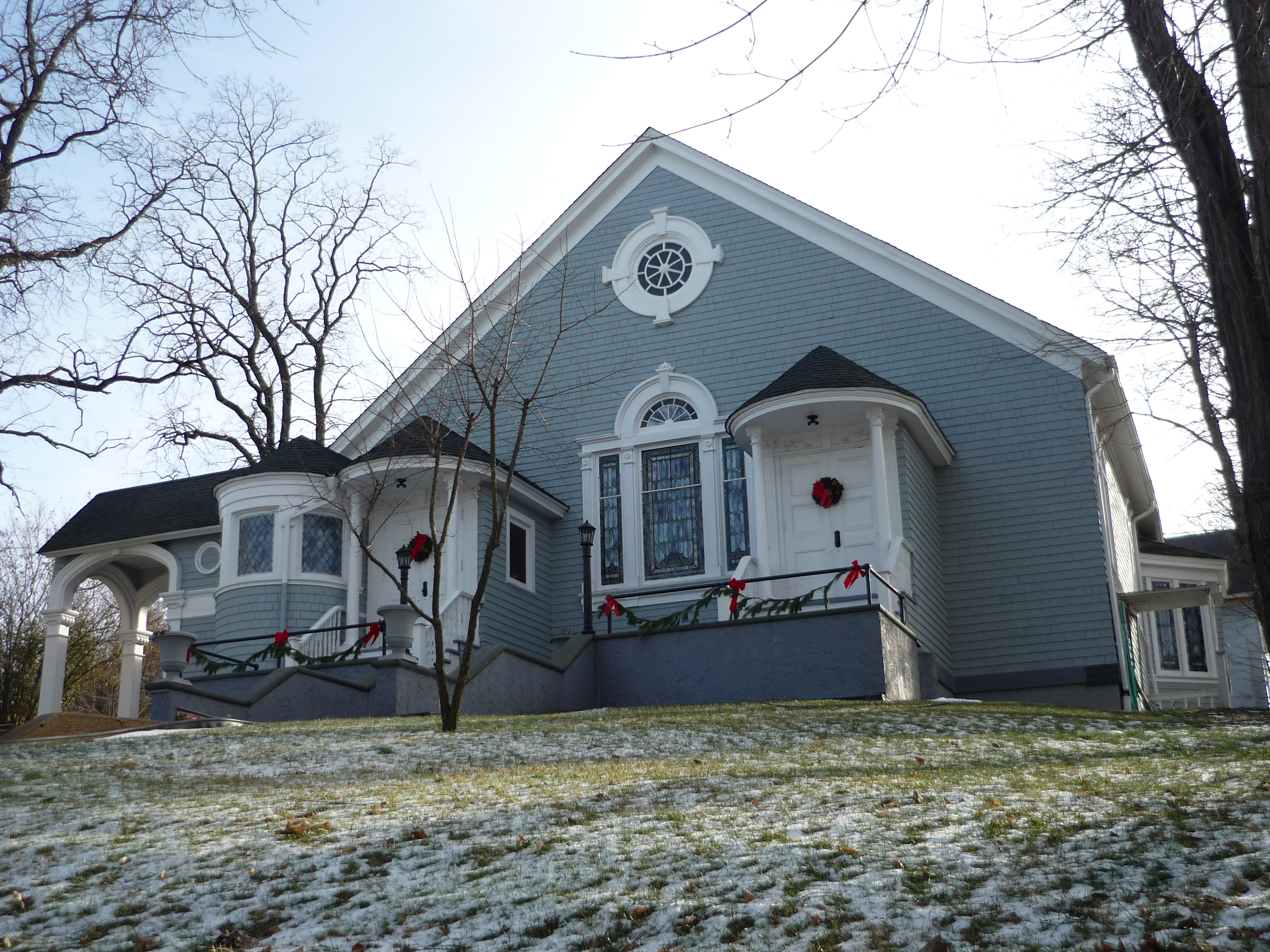
Wrightman Memorial Baptist Church

The first Baptist congregation started meeting in Oyster Bay in 1700 and it is the oldest Baptist congregation in the State of New York. The first minister, Robert Feeks was appointed in 1724 gaining him the distinction of being the first ordained minister in Oyster Bay of any denomination.

The original building was a plain unpainted wooden frame structure with flat planked pews and a small pulpit. During the Revolutionary War it was reportedly used to quarter occupying British troops, as were many other churches in the village. The congregation grew steadily and in 1806 a larger church was built on this site.

In 1882 this second building was moved back on the site and rotated 90 degrees to make room for the new church. In 1908, after several years of fundraising the church that is on the site today was completed. The 1806 building was then used as a Baptist church school.

Since the early 1980s the North Shore Assembly of God has made both the buildings their home, and have preserved the interior with all of its original details including carved pews and other woodwork, ornate pressed tin ceilings and walls, a built-in pipe organ, and the original stained glass windows.

=== 13. Octagon Hotel ===
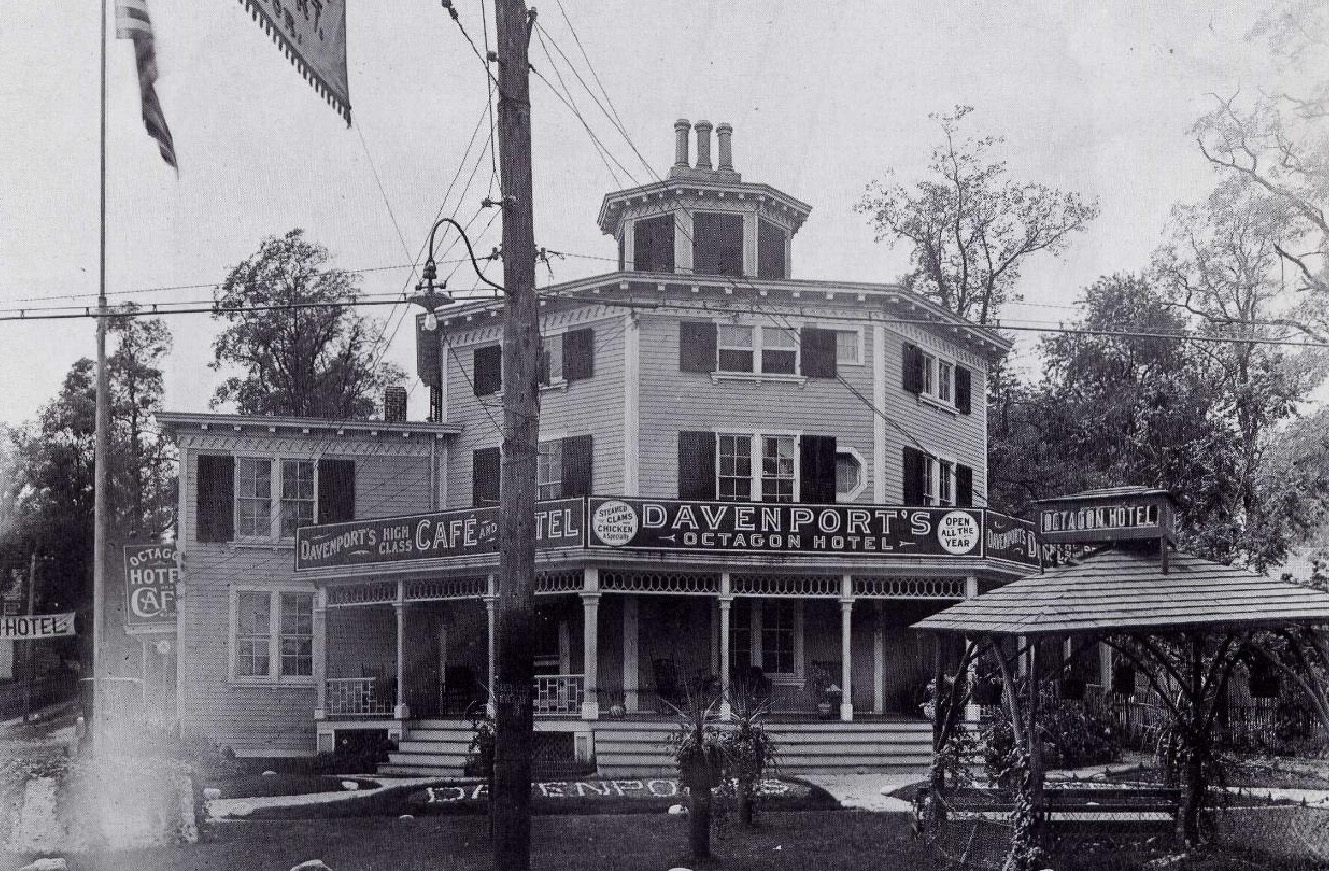
Octagon Hotel, c. 1910

=== 16. Raynham Hall Museum ===
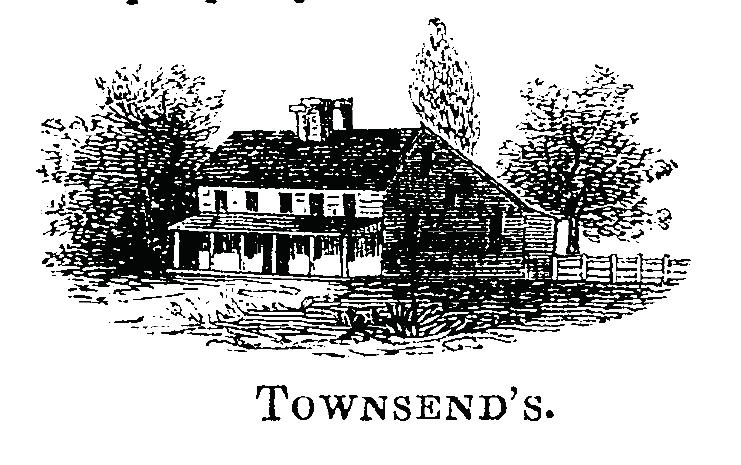
Raynham Hall Museum

=== 17. Seely/Wright House ===
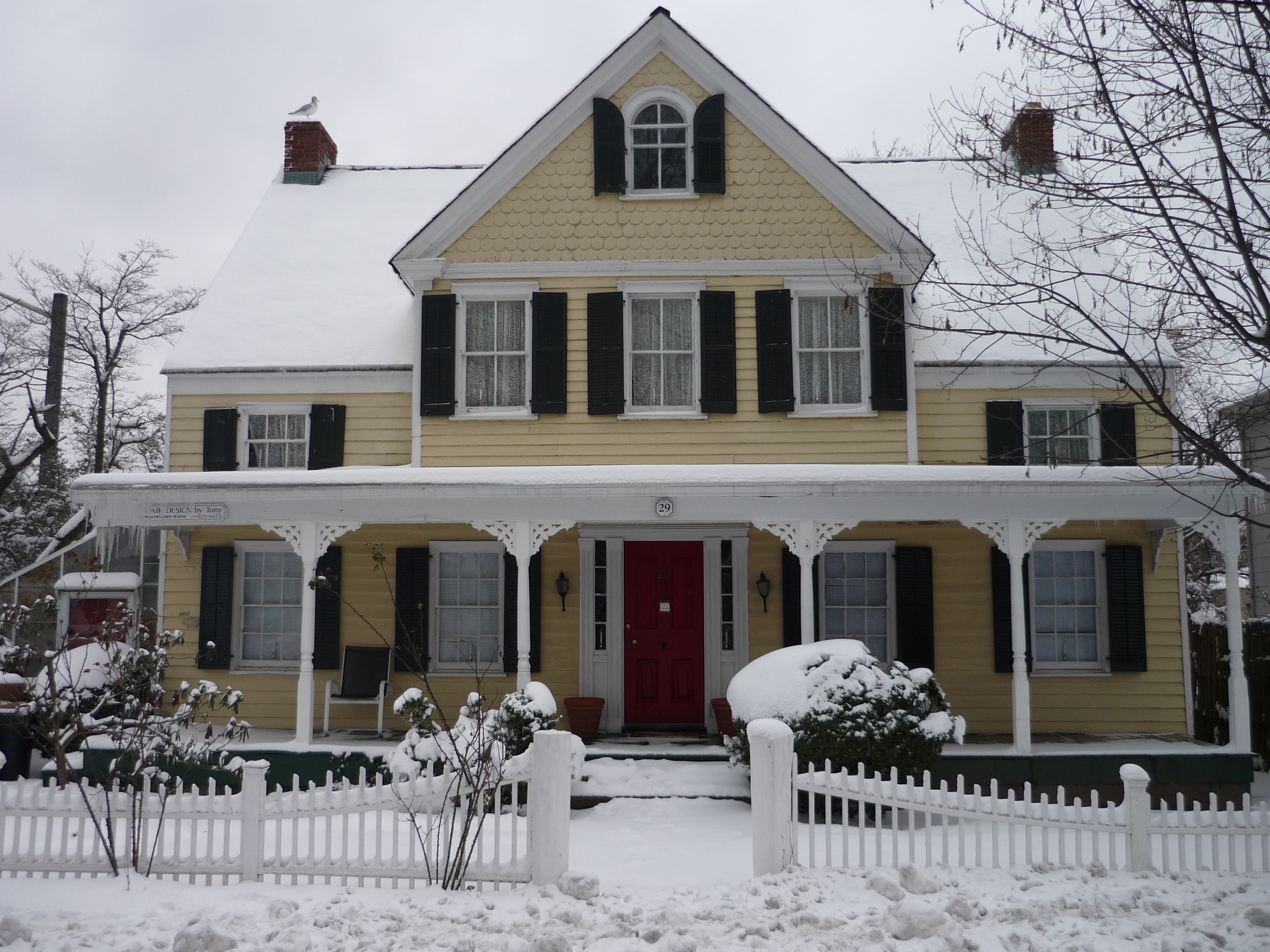
Seely/Wright House

=== 18. Ludlam Building ===
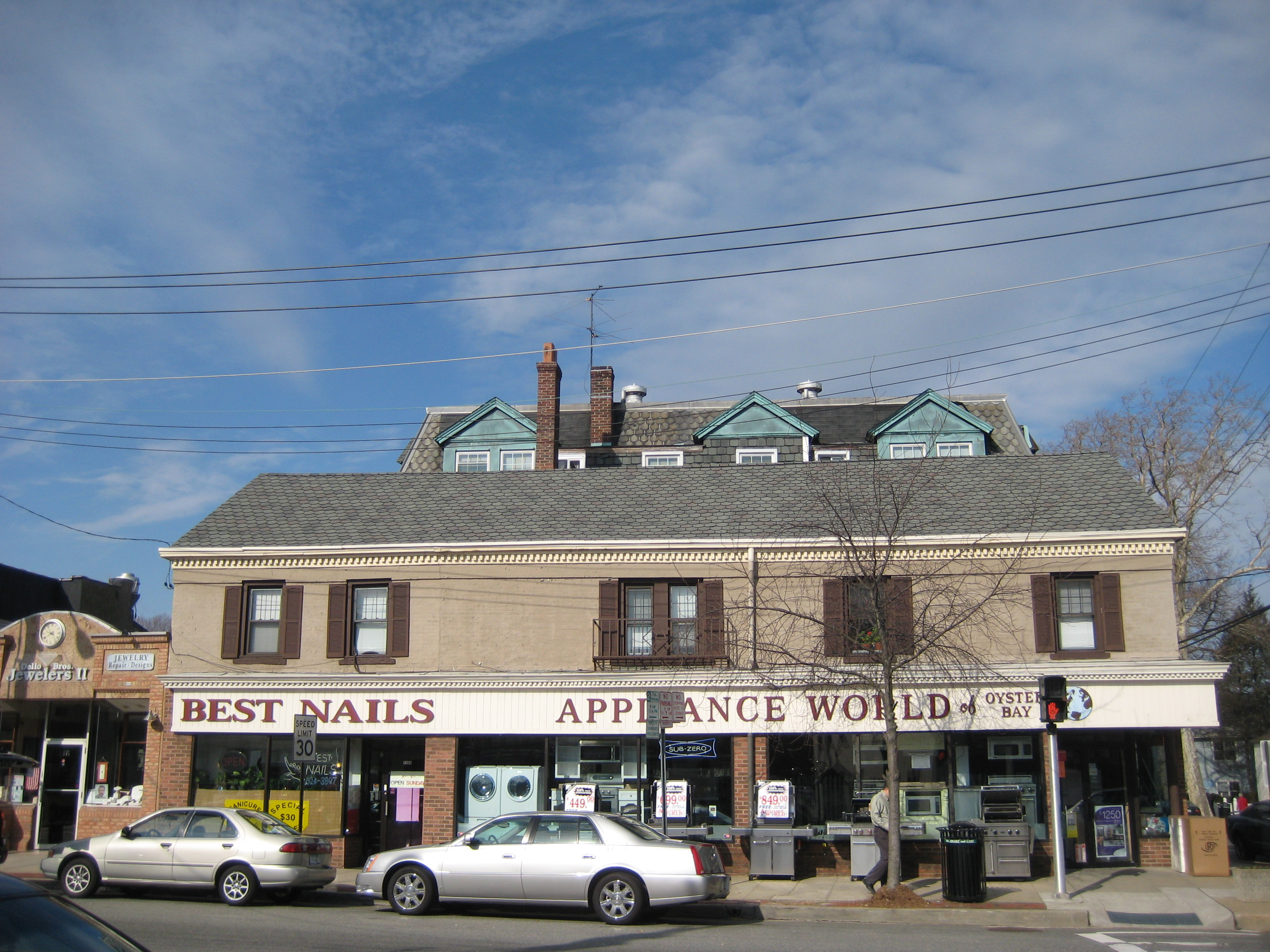
Ludlam Building

=== 19. Snouders Drug Store ===
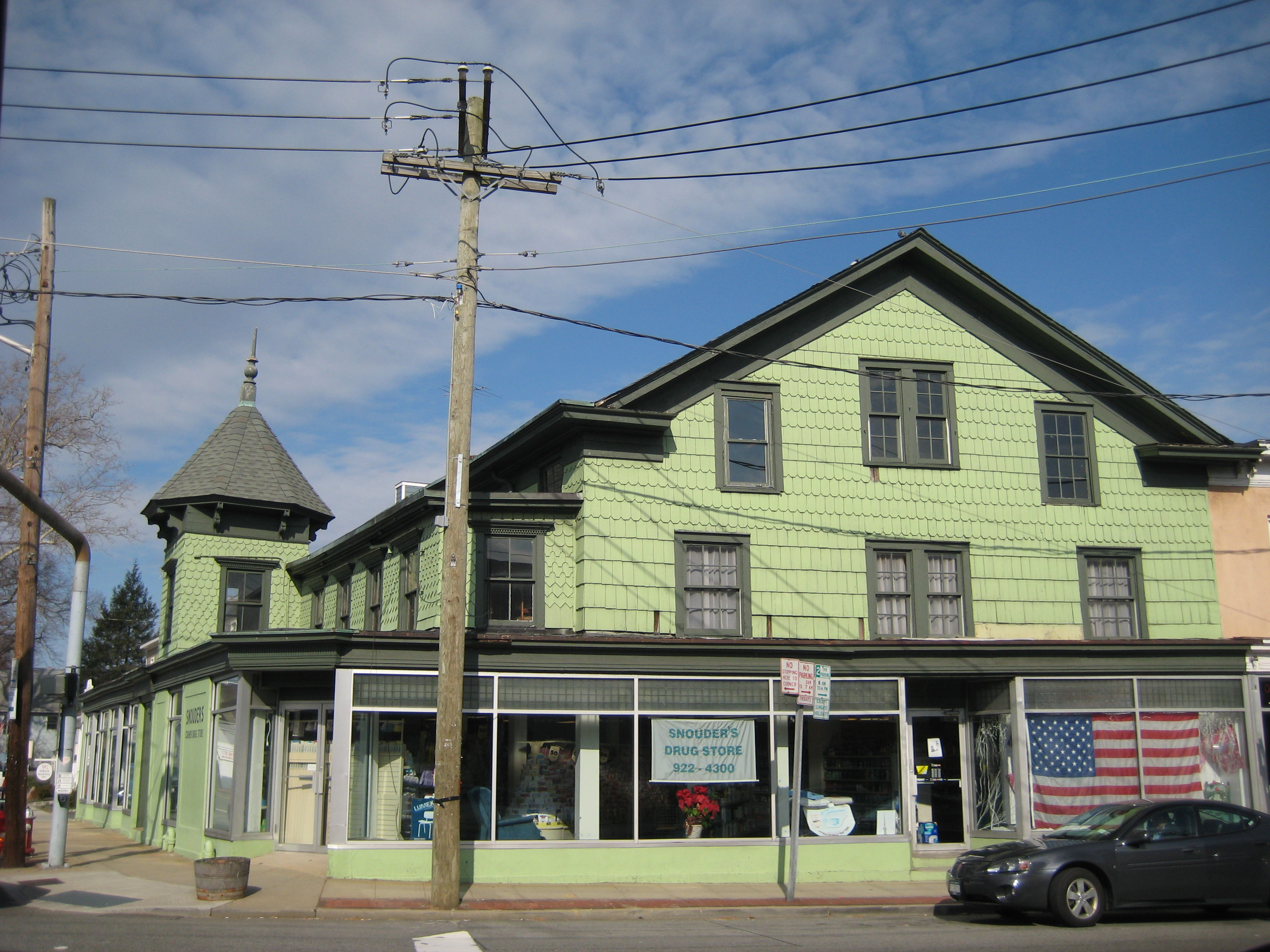
Snouders Drug Store

=== 20. Hood A.M.E. Zion Church ===
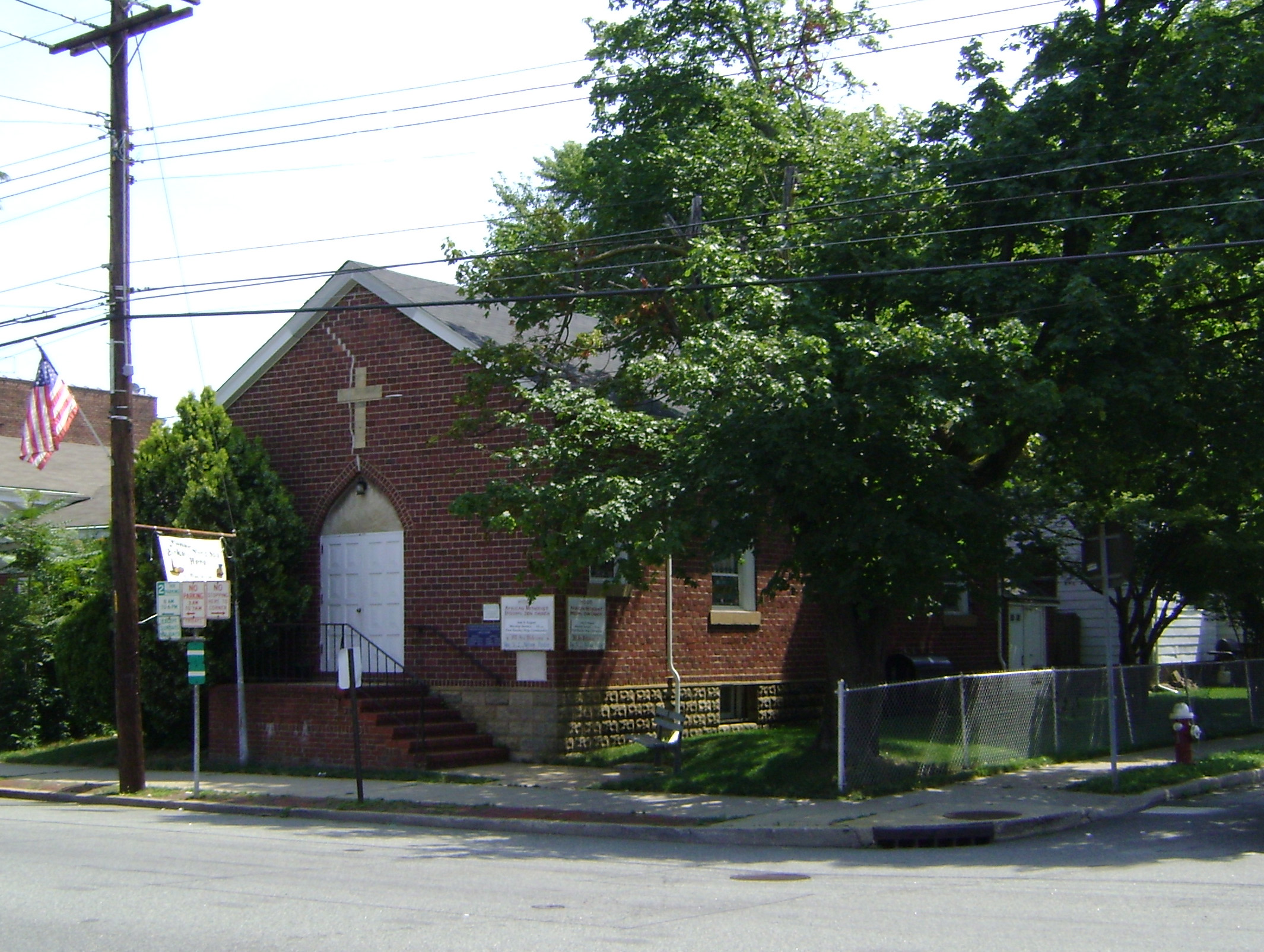
Hood A.M.E. Zion Church

=== 21. Earle-Wightman House ===
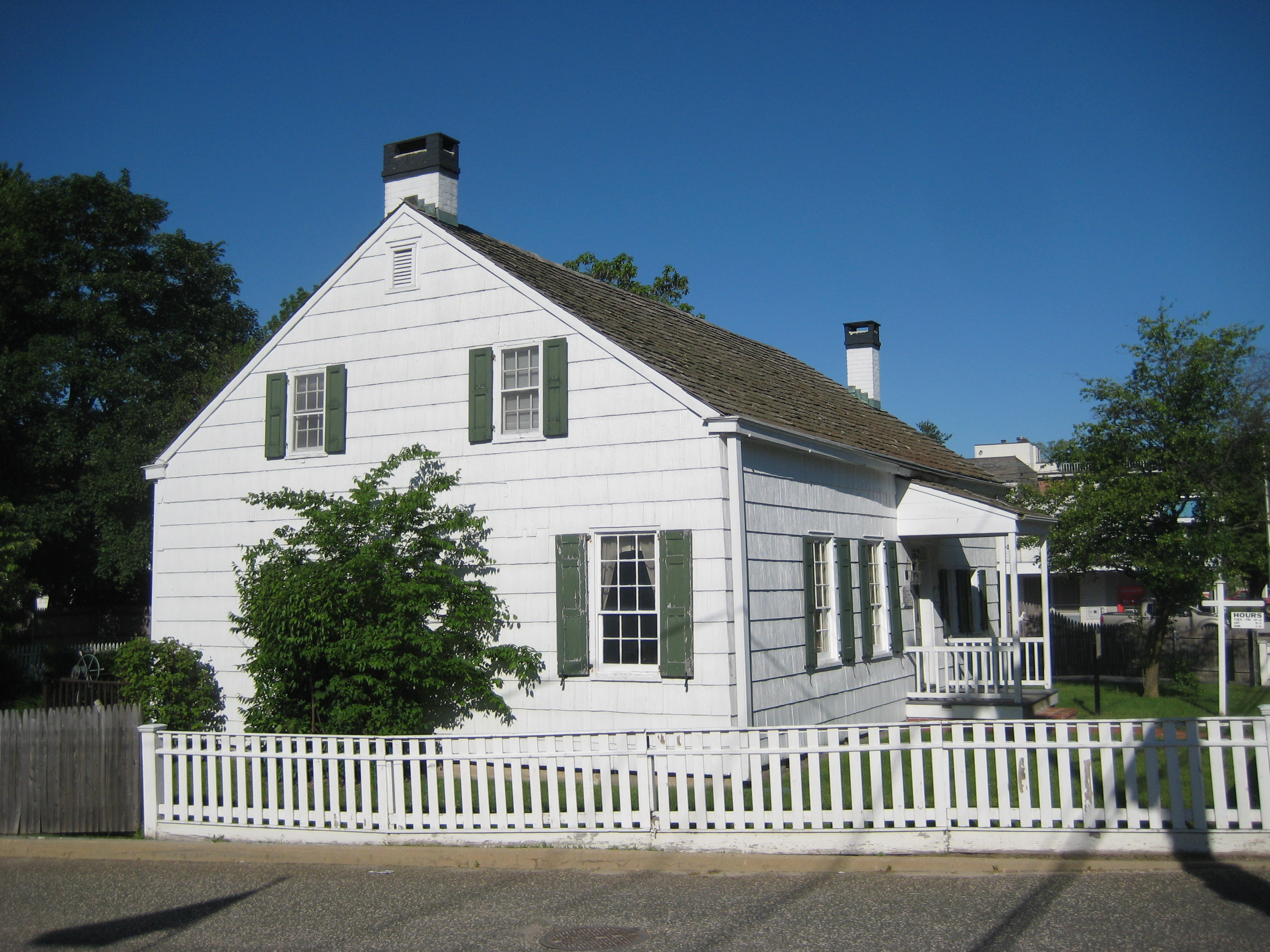
Earle-Wightman House

This house, named for two 19th-century Baptist ministers who resided in it, was originally built around 1720 as a small one-room dwelling. By 1897 it had been moved round the corner to its current site and extended.

In 1966 the house was donated to the Town of Oyster Bay, for the use of the Oyster Bay Historical Society. The society is headquartered at the house and operates it as a museum, with two rooms interpreted to the period 1740 and 1830.

=== 22. St. Paul's Methodist Church ===
The first group of Methodists in Oyster Bay formed in 1812 and used space at the Oyster Bay Academy for services when traveling ministers visited. Then in 1858 the congregation built a small church. In 1895 Joseph B. Wright, the blacksmith, bought the building from them and continued his business there for many years. The congregation then moved to St. Paul's, which they had been working on since 1891.

In 1904 a new pipe organ was installed; half of which was paid for by the wealthy philanthropist Andrew Carnegie. By 1913 the congregation had grown substantially, and to create more room the entire building was raised using a series of jacks. A basement was excavated and several rooms including a kitchen were built.

In the 1920s a forty-foot spire which used to extend above the bell tower was struck by lightning in the 1920s and had to be removed. The “Carnegie” organ no longer exists, and the interior has been given a more modern appearance.

In 1988 St. Paul’s Methodist Church merged with another congregation in East Norwich and the Bethel Pentecostal Church moved into this building. Bethel outgrew the building and moved to Westbury, and in 1999 the North Shore Community Church, part of the Presbyterian Church of America, made it their new home, along with the large parsonage next door.

The El Shaddai Pentecostal Church, another local congregation, holds their service in North Shore’s chapel.

The building is listed on the National Register of Historic Places.

=== 23. St. Dominic's Church and Chapel ===
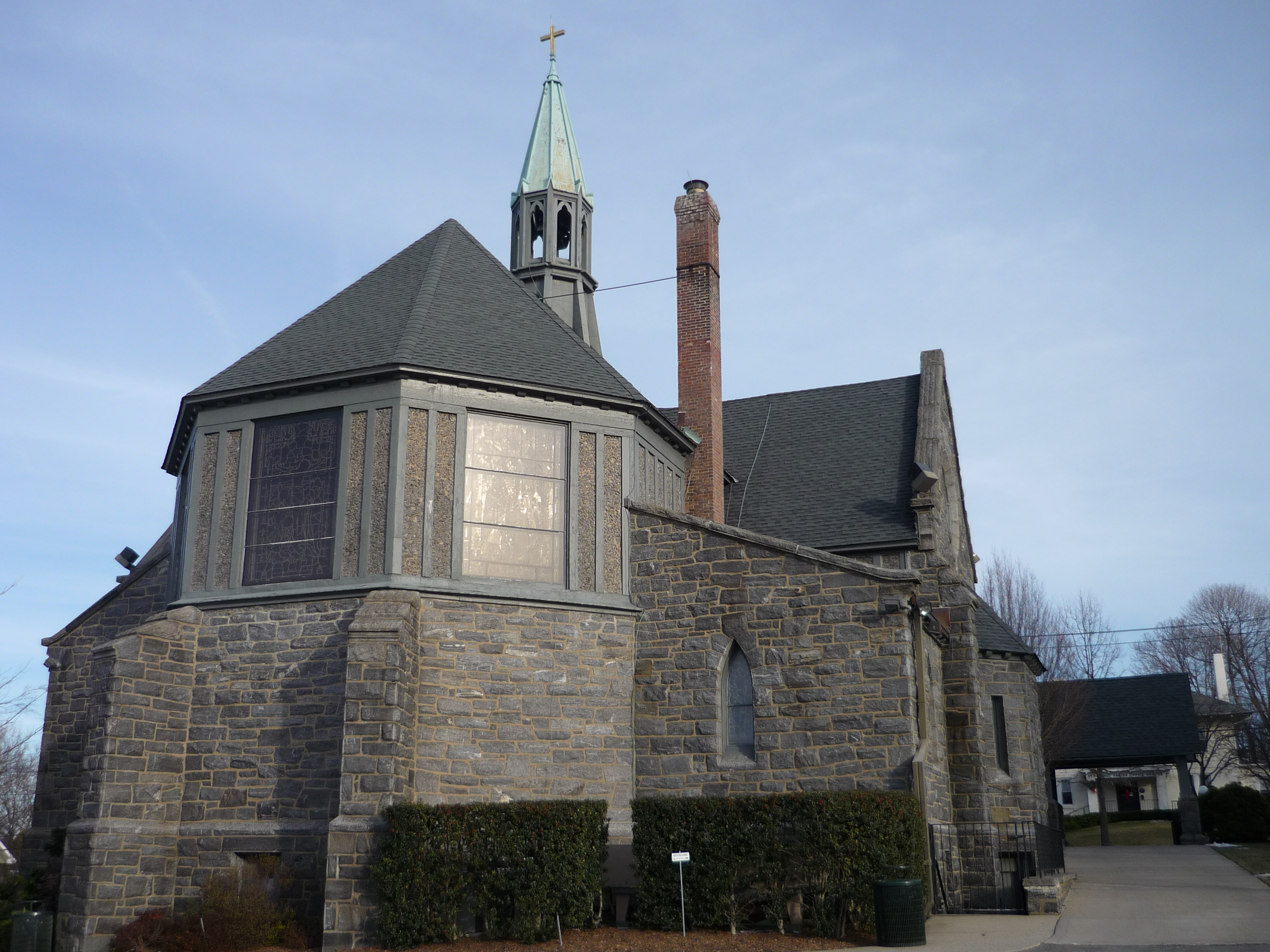
St. Dominic's Church and Chapel

=== 24. Oyster Bay Public Library ===
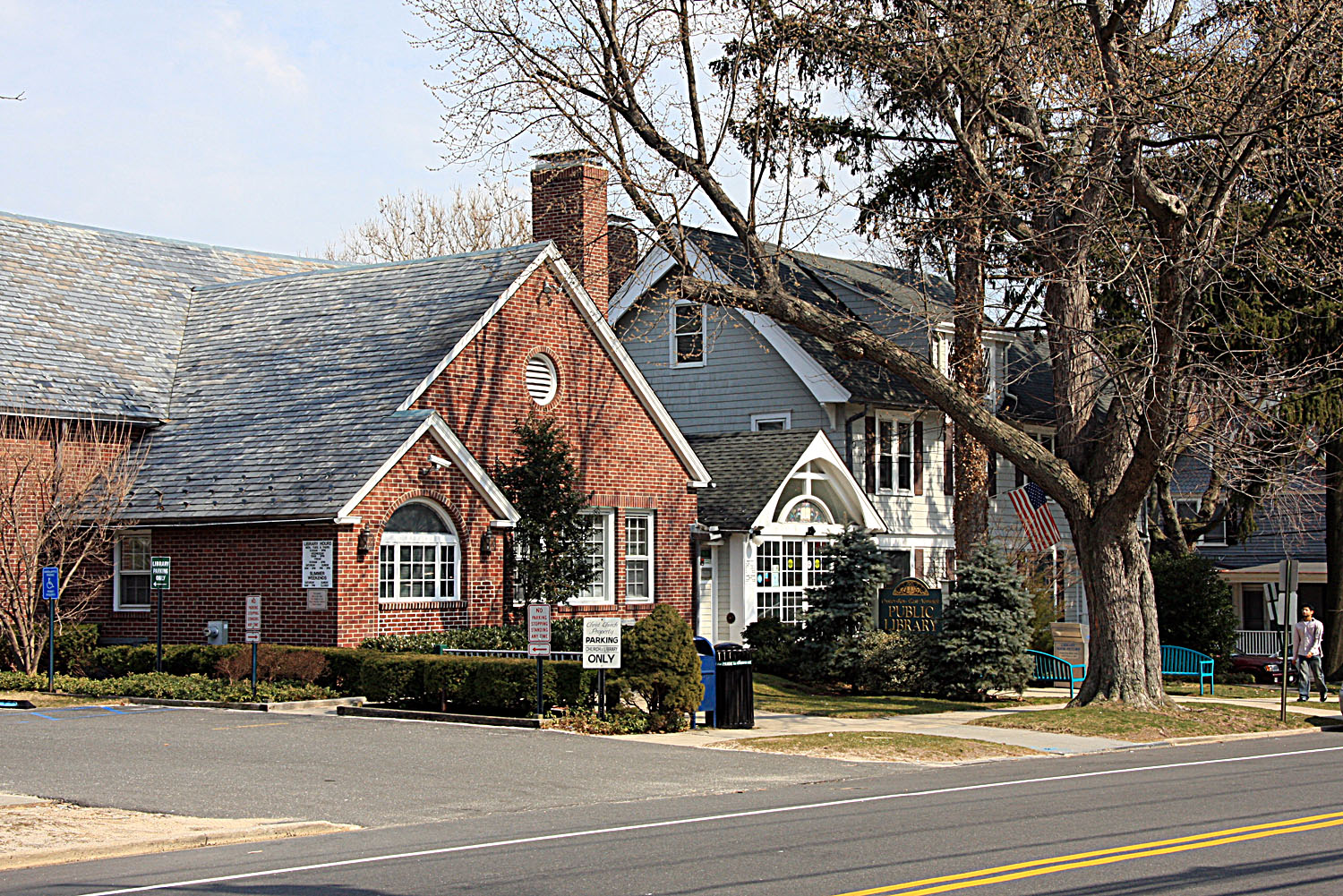
Oyster Bay Public Library

=== 25. Stoddard House ===
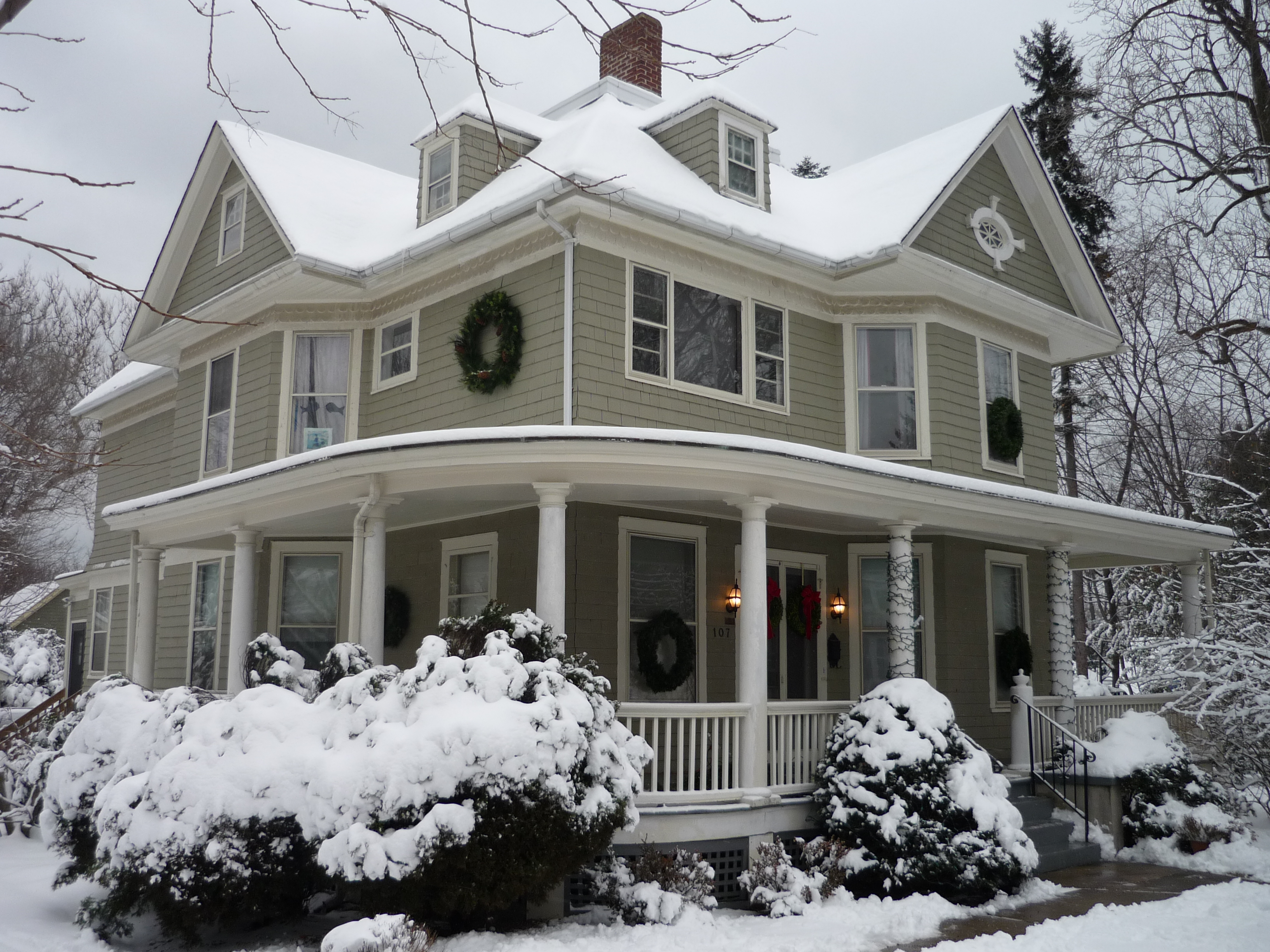
Stoddard House, 2008

=== 26. Oyster Bay High School ===
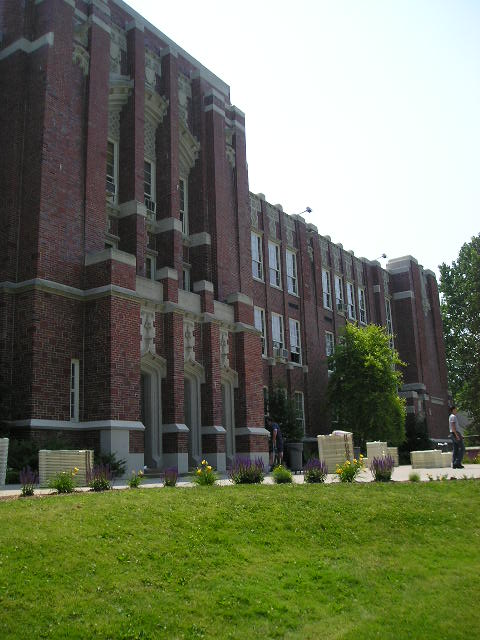
Oyster Bay High School

=== 27. Typhoid Mary in Oyster Bay ===
Mary Mallon worked as a cook in various part of the New York area between 1900 and 1907. One of her positions was with a wealthy New York banker, Charles Henry Warren and his family. When the Warrens rented the home of Mr. and Mrs. George Townsend in Oyster Bay for the summer of 1906, Mallon came along. From August 27 to September 3, six of the eleven people in the house came down with typhoid fever. Typhoid fever in Oyster Bay at that time was "unusual," according to three doctors who practiced medicine there.

The Townsends were worried they would be unable to rent their house and they hired George Soper in the winter of 1906 to investigate. Soper in his investigation published June 15, 1907, in the Journal of the American Medical Association, said he believed soft clams might be the source of the outbreak. He then wrote:

"It was found that the family changed cooks on August 4. This was about three weeks before the typhoid epidemic broke out... She remained in the family only a short time, leaving about three weeks after the outbreak occurred. The cook was described as an Irish woman about 40 years of age, tall, heavy, single. She seemed to be in perfect health."

Soper would later apprehend Mary Mallon in New York, and she was placed in isolation on North Brother Island, not once but twice.

=== 28. Wilson House ===
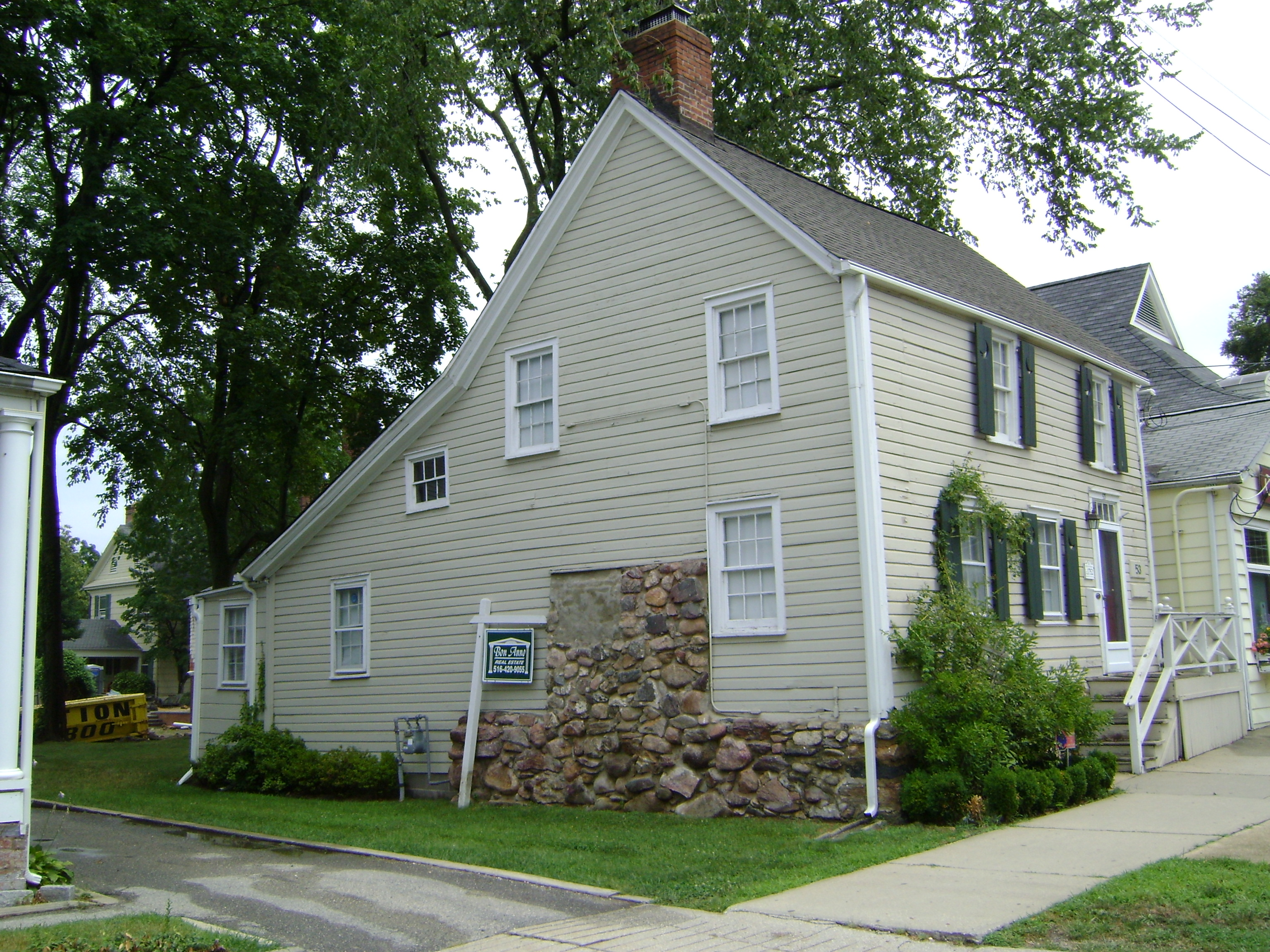
Wilson House, in 2008

=== 29. First Presbyterian Church of Oyster Bay ===
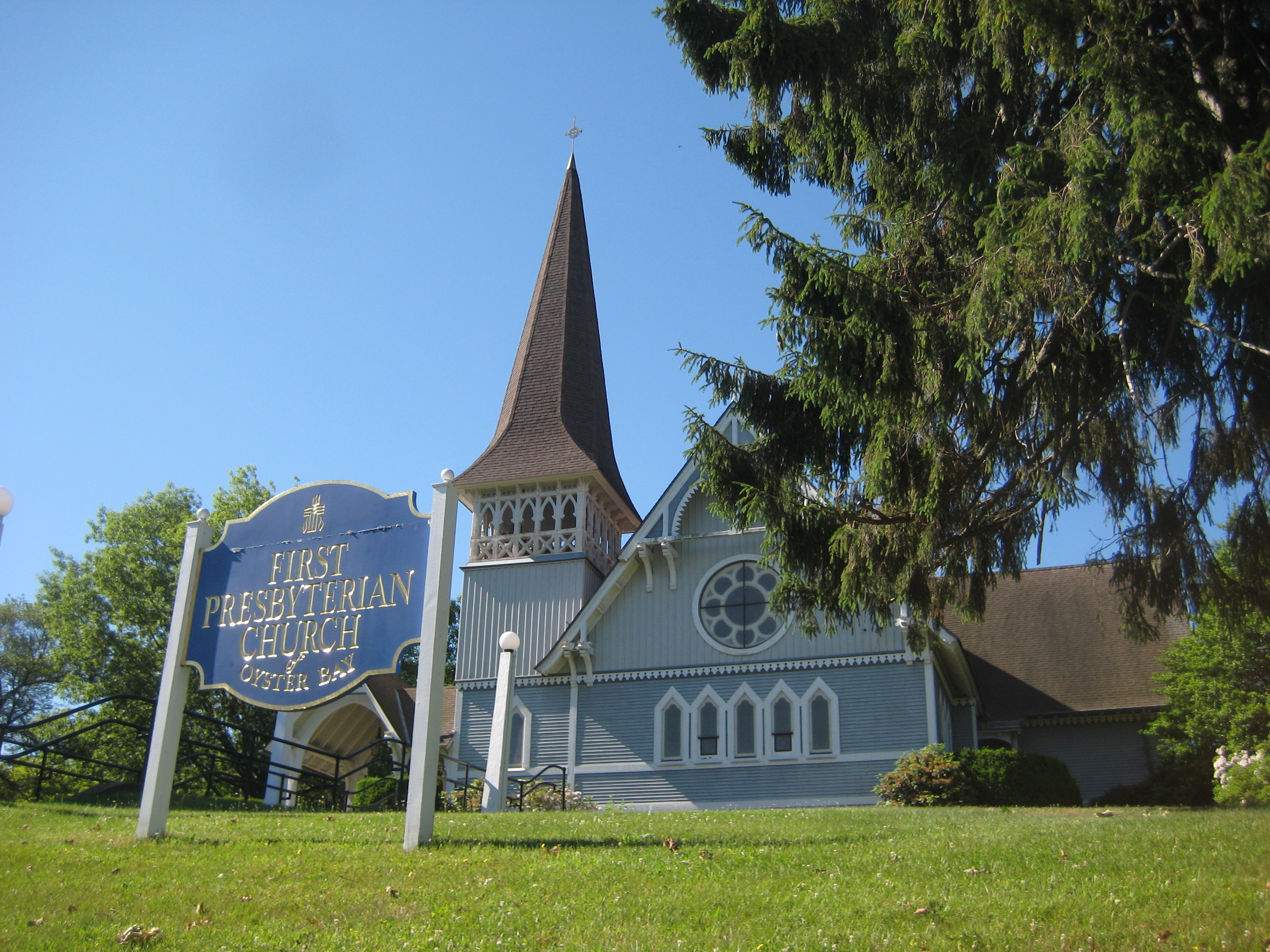
First Presbyterian Church of Oyster Bay

=== 30. Christ Church of Oyster Bay ===
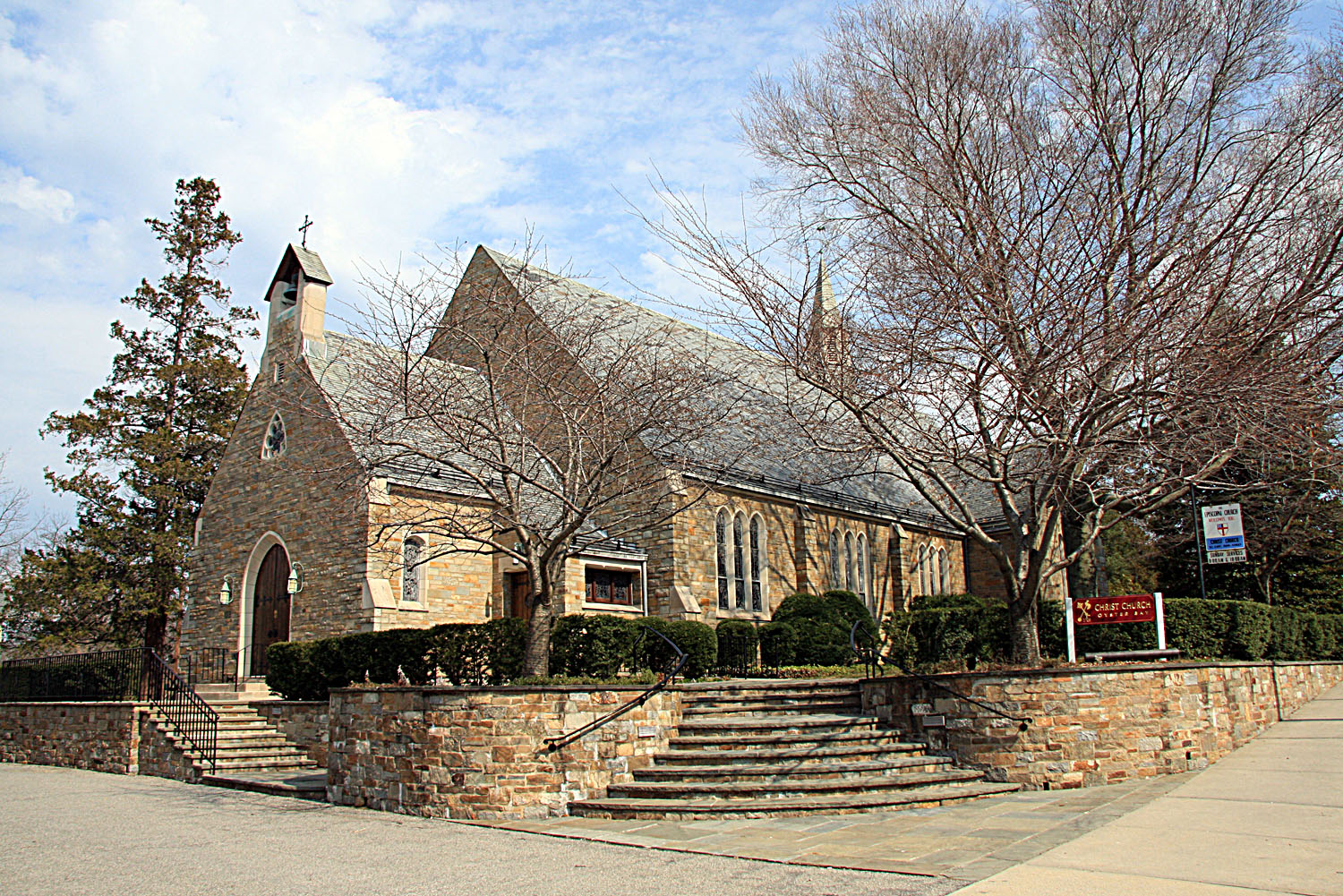
Christ Church of Oyster Bay

== See also ==
- List of Town of Oyster Bay Landmarks
- New York State Historic Markers, Nassau County, Town of Oyster Bay
- National Register of Historic Places listings in Nassau County, New York
- Similar walks:
  - Baltimore Heritage Walk
  - Boston Freedom Trail
  - New London Heritage Trail
