= National Register of Historic Places listings in Nassau County, New York =

Location of Nassau County in New York

List of the National Register of Historic Places listings in Nassau County, New York

This list is intended to provide a comprehensive set of listings on the National Register of Historic Places in Nassau County, New York. It includes 156 buildings, structures, sites, objects or districts listed on the U.S. National Register of Historic Places. Four of these are further designated National Historic Landmarks, and one is a National Historic Site operated by the National Park Service.

This National Park Service list is complete through NPS recent listings posted August 22, 2025.

Contents: Counties in New York
Albany (Albany) – Allegany – Bronx – Broome – Cattaraugus – Cayuga – Chautauqua – Chemung – Chenango – Clinton – Columbia – Cortland – Delaware – Dutchess (Poughkeepsie, Rhinebeck) – Erie (Buffalo) – Essex – Franklin – Fulton – Genesee – Greene – Hamilton – Herkimer – Jefferson – Kings – Lewis – Livingston – Madison – Monroe (Rochester) – Montgomery – Nassau – New York (Below 14th Street, 14th to 59th Streets, 59th to 110th Streets, Above 110th Street, Islands) – Niagara (Niagara Falls) – Oneida – Onondaga (Syracuse) – Ontario – Orange – Orleans – Oswego – Otsego – Putnam – Queens – Rensselaer – Richmond – Rockland – St. Lawrence – Saratoga – Schenectady – Schoharie – Schuyler – Seneca – Steuben – Suffolk – Sullivan – Tioga – Tompkins – Ulster – Warren – Washington – Wayne – Westchester (Northern, Southern, New Rochelle, Peekskill, Yonkers) – Wyoming – Yates

== NRHP listings by town and city ==
=== Hempstead ===
There are 29 places listed in the Town of Hempstead.

=== North Hempstead ===
There are 51 places listed in the Town of North Hempstead.

=== Oyster Bay ===
There are 63 places listed in the Town of Oyster Bay.

=== Glen Cove ===
There are 6 places listed in the City of Glen Cove.

=== Long Beach ===
There are 7 places listed in the City of Long Beach.

== See also ==
- National Register of Historic Places listings in New York
- List of Town of North Hempstead Designated Landmarks
- List of Town of Oyster Bay Landmarks
