= National Register of Historic Places listings in Oyster Bay (town), New York =

This is a list of all National Register of Historic Places listings in the Town of Oyster Bay, in Nassau County, New York. The locations of National Register properties for which the latitude and longitude coordinates are included below, may be seen in an online map.

== Current listings ==
	Name on the Register	Image	Date listed	Location	City or town	Description
1	Adam-Derby House	Adam-Derby House	May 17, 1979 (#79001597)	166 Lexington Avenue; 40°52′02″N 73°32′05″W	Oyster Bay	
2	John E. Aldred Estate	John E. Aldred Estate	August 3, 1979 (#79001594)	Lattingtown Road; 40°53′40″N 73°36′59″W	Lattingtown	
3	James William Beekman House		December 12, 1973 (#73001212)	West Shore Road; 40°52′45″N 73°32′49″W	Mill Neck	
4	Building at 390 Ocean Avenue	Building at 390 Ocean Avenue	October 27, 2017 (#100001770)	390 Ocean Avenue; 40°40′26″N 73°28′14″W	Massapequa	
5	Central Hall	Central Hall	February 18, 1988 (#88000019)	93 Central Avenue; 40°50′54″N 73°38′54″W	Sea Cliff	
6	Christ Building	Christ Building	January 4, 2012 (#11001002)	357-359 Sea Cliff Ave. 40°50′58″N 73°38′59″W	Sea Cliff	
7	Christ Church	Christ Church	November 9, 2018 (#100003115)	61 E Main St. 40°52′20″N 73°31′40″W	Oyster Bay	Theodore Roosevelt's family church, established in 1705, with buildings dating to 1870s
8	Christeen	Christeen	December 4, 1991 (#91002060)	40°52′40″N 73°32′23″W	Oyster Bay	Built in 1883, the oldest surviving oyster sloop in the U.S.
9	Church of Our Lady of Kazan	Church of Our Lady of Kazan	October 4, 2016 (#16000695)	2 Willow Shore Ave. 40°50′21″N 73°39′05″W	Sea Cliff	1942 Orthodox church built by Russian emigrés displaced by early 20th-century upheavals at home.
10	Cock-Cornelius House	Cock-Cornelius House	March 22, 2006 (#06000157)	34 Birch Hill Road; 40°52′27″N 73°35′17″W	Locust Valley	
11	Cold Spring Harbor Laboratory Historic District	Cold Spring Harbor Laboratory Historic District	March 30, 1994 (#94000198)	Jct. of NY 25A and Bungtown Road; 40°51′43″N 73°28′02″W	Laurel Hollow	
12	Crowell House	Crowell House	February 18, 1988 (#88000020)	375 Littleworth Lane; 40°50′20″N 73°38′55″W	Sea Cliff	
13	Lillian Sefton Dodge Estate	Lillian Sefton Dodge Estate	July 22, 1979 (#79001595)	Frost Mill Road; 40°52′39″N 73°33′34″W	Mill Neck	
14	DuPont-Guest Estate	DuPont-Guest Estate	December 11, 2009 (#09001084)	S. side of Northern Blvd. between Cotillion Ct. & DuPont Ct. 40°48′32″N 73°36′53″W	Brookville	
15	Elmwood		April 3, 1975 (#75001200)	E side of Cove Road; 40°51′59″N 73°29′45″W	Oyster Bay	
16	First Presbyterian Church of Oyster Bay	First Presbyterian Church of Oyster Bay	December 12, 1976 (#76001232)	E. Main Street; 40°52′18″N 73°31′45″W	Oyster Bay	
17	Fort Massapeag Archeological Site	Fort Massapeag Archeological Site	April 19, 1993 (#93000610)	Sunset Park; 40°39′11″N 73°27′40″W	Massapequa	Site of only known remaining Native American fort on western Long Island
18	A. Conger Goodyear House	A. Conger Goodyear House	December 4, 2003 (#03001246)	14 Orchard Lane; 40°48′04″N 73°35′24″W	Old Westbury	
19	Grace Church Complex	Grace Church Complex	June 30, 1983 (#83001713)	Merrick and Dover Roads; 40°40′01″N 73°27′33″W	Massapequa	
20	Stephen Harding House	Stephen Harding House	August 24, 2011 (#11000597)	182 14th Ave. 40°50′54″N 73°38′58″W	Sea Cliff	
21	Heitz Place Courthouse	Heitz Place Courthouse	July 30, 1974 (#74001263)	Heitz Place; 40°46′08″N 73°31′16″W	Hicksville	
22	House at 9 Locust Place	House at 9 Locust Place	February 18, 1988 (#88000030)	9 Locust Place; 40°50′40″N 73°39′05″W	Sea Cliff	
23	House at 18 Seventeenth Avenue	House at 18 Seventeenth Avenue	February 18, 1988 (#88000011)	18 Seventeenth Avenue; 40°50′49″N 73°38′49″W	Sea Cliff	
24	House at 19 Locust Place	House at 19 Locust Place	February 18, 1988 (#88000010)	19 Locust Place; 40°50′38″N 73°39′04″W	Sea Cliff	
25	House at 52 Eighteenth Avenue	House at 52 Eighteenth Avenue	March 18, 1988 (#88000032)	52 Eighteenth Avenue; 40°50′48″N 73°39′01″W	Sea Cliff	
26	House at 52 Frost Mill Road		August 24, 2011 (#11000598)	52 Frost Mill Road; 40°53′13″N 73°33′39″W	Mill Neck	
27	House at 58 Eighteenth Avenue	House at 58 Eighteenth Avenue	February 18, 1988 (#88000002)	58 Eighteenth Avenue; 40°50′48″N 73°39′01″W	Sea Cliff	
28	House at 65 Twentieth Avenue	House at 65 Twentieth Avenue	February 18, 1988 (#88000001)	65 Twentieth Avenue; 40°50′45″N 73°39′09″W	Sea Cliff	
29	House at 103 Roslyn Avenue	House at 103 Roslyn Avenue	February 18, 1988 (#88000018)	103 Roslyn Avenue; 40°50′51″N 73°38′43″W	Sea Cliff	
30	House at 112 Sea Cliff Avenue	House at 112 Sea Cliff Avenue	February 18, 1988 (#88000015)	112 Sea Cliff Avenue; 40°50′59″N 73°38′28″W	Sea Cliff	
31	House at 115 Central Avenue	House at 115 Central Avenue	February 18, 1988 (#88000014)	115 Central Avenue; 40°50′49″N 73°38′53″W	Sea Cliff	Also named "The Woodshed."
32	House at 137 Prospect Avenue	House at 137 Prospect Avenue	February 18, 1988 (#88000016)	137 Prospect Avenue; 40°50′54″N 73°39′02″W	Sea Cliff	
33	House at 173 Sixteenth Avenue	House at 173 Sixteenth Avenue	February 18, 1988 (#88000013)	173 Sixteenth Avenue; 40°50′51″N 73°39′10″W	Sea Cliff	
34	House at 176 Prospect Avenue	House at 176 Prospect Avenue	February 18, 1988 (#88000012)	176 Prospect Avenue; 40°50′54″N 73°39′03″W	Sea Cliff	
35	House at 195 Prospect Avenue	House at 195 Prospect Avenue	February 18, 1988 (#88000009)	195 Prospect Avenue; 40°50′49″N 73°39′04″W	Sea Cliff	
36	House at 199 Prospect Avenue	House at 199 Prospect Avenue	February 18, 1988 (#88000008)	199 Prospect Avenue; 40°50′49″N 73°39′04″W	Sea Cliff	
37	House at 207 Carpenter Avenue	House at 207 Carpenter Avenue	February 18, 1988 (#88000007)	207 Carpenter Avenue; 40°50′56″N 73°38′31″W	Sea Cliff	
38	House at 240 Sea Cliff Avenue	House at 240 Sea Cliff Avenue	February 18, 1988 (#88000006)	240 Sea Cliff Avenue; 40°50′58″N 73°38′44″W	Sea Cliff	
39	House at 285 Sea Cliff Avenue	House at 285 Sea Cliff Avenue	February 18, 1988 (#88000005)	285 Sea Cliff Avenue; 40°50′55″N 73°38′50″W	Sea Cliff	
40	House at 332 Franklin Avenue	House at 332 Franklin Avenue	February 18, 1988 (#88000038)	332 Franklin Avenue; 40°50′42″N 73°39′03″W	Sea Cliff	
41	House at 362 Sea Cliff Avenue	House at 362 Sea Cliff Avenue	February 18, 1988 (#88000037)	362 Sea Cliff Avenue; 40°50′58″N 73°39′01″W	Sea Cliff	
42	House at 378 Glen Avenue	House at 378 Glen Avenue	February 18, 1988 (#88000033)	378 Glen Avenue; 40°50′44″N 73°39′04″W	Sea Cliff	
43	Jericho Friends Meeting House Complex	Jericho Friends Meeting House Complex	May 10, 2002 (#02000473)	6 Old Jericho Turnpike; 40°47′40″N 73°32′12″W	Jericho	
44	Long Island Rail Road Station at Farmingdale	Long Island Rail Road Station at Farmingdale	November 13, 1991 (#91001677)	Along LIRR tracks between Farmingdale and Forest Avenues; 40°44′08″N 73°26′32″W	Farmingdale	
45	Matinecock Friends Meetinghouse	Matinecock Friends Meetinghouse	July 19, 1976 (#76001231)	Piping Rock and Duck Pond Roads; 40°51′59″N 73°35′41″W	Locust Valley	
46	Moore's Building	Moore's Building	September 30, 1996 (#96001043)	1 East Main Street; 40°52′18″N 73°31′37″W	Oyster Bay	
47	Benjamin Moore Estate	Benjamin Moore Estate	May 14, 1979 (#79001596)	N of Muttontown on NY 25A; 40°50′19″N 73°32′17″W	Muttontown	
48	Oyster Bay Long Island Rail Road Station	Oyster Bay Long Island Rail Road Station	July 6, 2005 (#05000666)	Railroad Avenue; 40°53′13″N 73°31′43″W	Oyster Bay	
49	Oyster Bay Long Island Rail Road Turntable	Oyster Bay Long Island Rail Road Turntable	July 6, 2005 (#05000667)	Railroad Avenue; 40°52′38″N 73°31′43″W	Oyster Bay	
50	Pine Hollow Cemetery	Pine Hollow Cemetery	July 27, 2018 (#100002740)	Pine Hollow Road; 40°51′37″N 73°32′11″W	Oyster Bay	Burial ground for members of small local black community since early 19th century
51	Planting Fields Arboretum	Planting Fields Arboretum	January 25, 1979 (#79001598)	Planting Fields Road; 40°51′29″N 73°33′29″W	Upper Brookville	
52	Raynham Hall	Raynham Hall	June 5, 1974 (#74001264)	20 West Main Street; 40°52′20″N 73°31′55″W	Oyster Bay	
53	James Alfred Roosevelt Estate		May 17, 1979 (#79001592)	360 Cove Neck Road; 40°53′02″N 73°30′29″W	Cove Neck	
54	Sagamore Hill National Historic Site	Sagamore Hill National Historic Site	October 15, 1966 (#66000096)	End of Cove Neck Road; 40°53′08″N 73°29′51″W	Cove Neck	
55	St. Luke's Protestant Episcopal Church	St. Luke's Protestant Episcopal Church	February 18, 1988 (#88000017)	253 Glen Street; 40°50′49″N 73°38′44″W	Sea Cliff	
56	Schenck-Mann House		February 24, 2005 (#05000089)	222 Convent Road; 40°49′19″N 73°29′25″W	Syosset	
57	Schmidlapp-Humes Estate Historic District		August 27, 2020 (#100005469)	5 Frost Mill Rd., 345 Oyster Bay Rd., and 3 Dogwood Ln. 40°52′17″N 73°34′22″W	Mill Neck	
58	Sea Cliff Firehouse	Sea Cliff Firehouse	May 18, 2003 (#03000408)	Roslyn Avenue; 40°50′54″N 73°38′43″W	Sea Cliff	
59	Sea Cliff Village Hall, Library and Museum Complex	Sea Cliff Village Hall, Library and Museum Complex	April 22, 2005 (#05000328)	300 Sea Cliff Avenue; 40°50′58″N 73°38′49″W	Sea Cliff	
60	Seawanhaka Corinthian Yacht Club	Seawanhaka Corinthian Yacht Club	January 8, 1974 (#74001265)	Centre Island Road; 40°54′08″N 73°30′49″W	Centre Island	
61	Edward H. Swan House		May 24, 1976 (#76001233)	Cove Neck Road; 40°52′38″N 73°30′12″W	Oyster Bay	
62	George Underhill House		July 5, 2003 (#03000592)	28 Factory Pond Road; 40°53′45″N 73°34′40″W	Locust Valley	
63	US Post Office-Oyster Bay	US Post Office-Oyster Bay	May 11, 1989 (#88002393)	Shore Avenue; 40°52′27″N 73°32′00″W	Oyster Bay	

== See also ==
- National Register of Historic Places listings in New York
- National Register of Historic Places listings in Nassau County, New York
- List of Town of Oyster Bay Landmarks
