= Sea Cliff Village Hall, Library and Museum Complex =

- U.S. National Register of Historic Places
- New York State Register of Historic Places
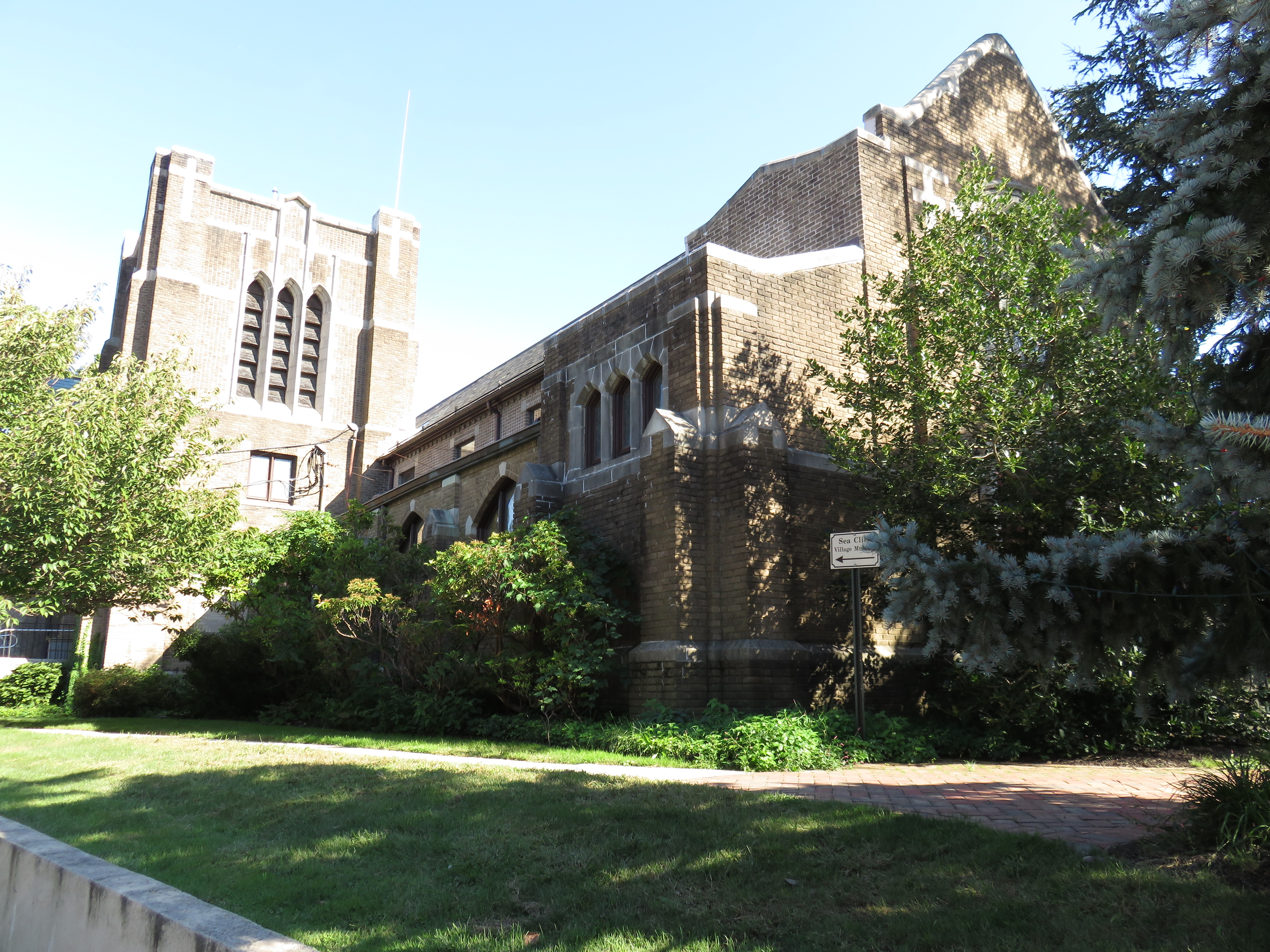
- The complex from the northwest

- Location within New York Location within the United States
- Location: 300 Sea Cliff Avenue, Sea Cliff, New York
- Coordinates: 40.849435°N 73.647120°W
- Area: less than one acre
- Built by: H. H. Vought
- Architect: Milton See & Son
- Architectural style: Tudor Revival, Late Gothic Revival
- NRHP reference No.: 05000328

Significant dates
- Added to NRHP: April 22, 2005
- Designated NYSRHP: January 5, 2005

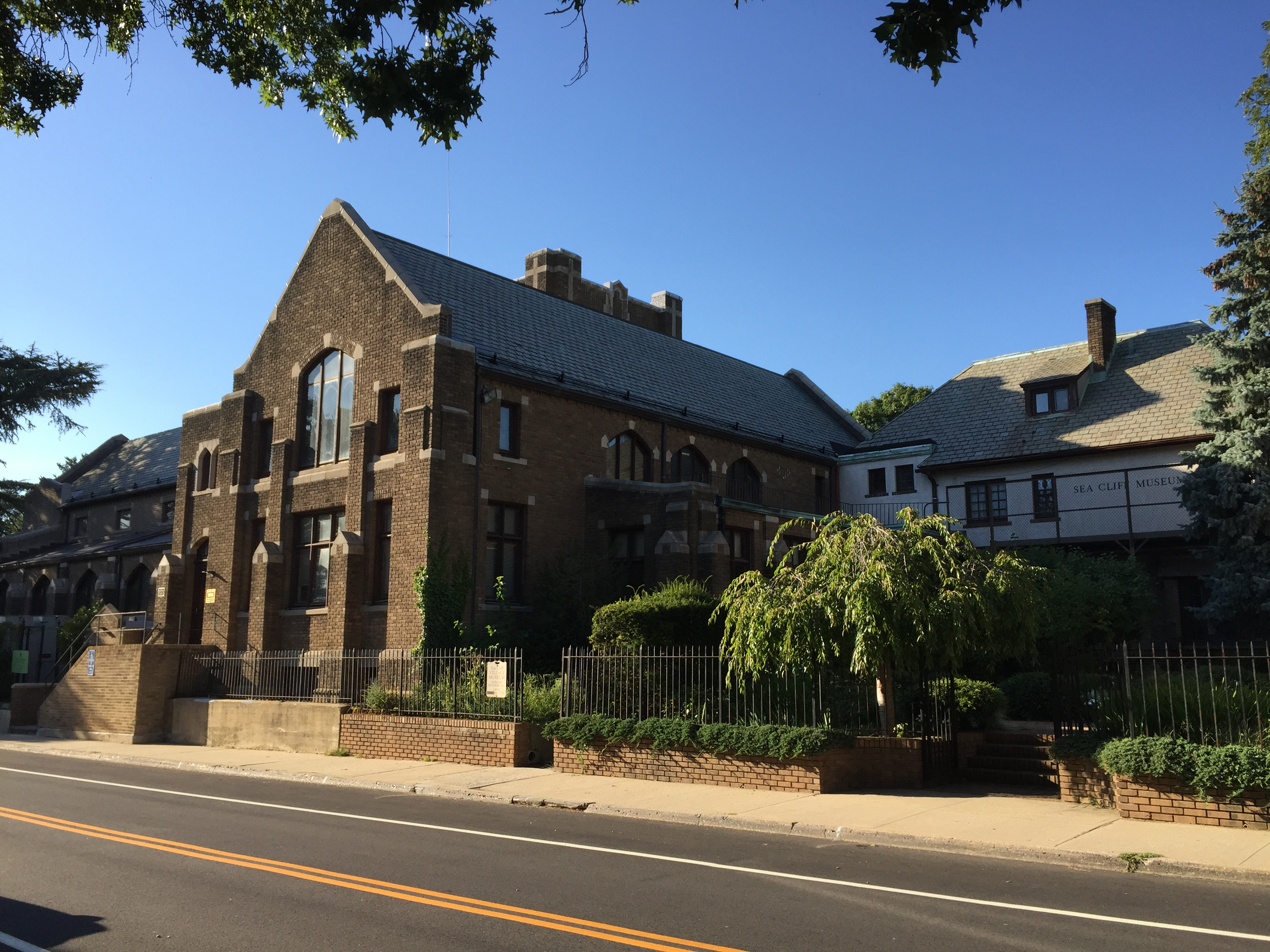
The complex from the southeast

The Sea Cliff Village Hall, Library and Museum Complex is a historic civic building complex located in the Village of Sea Cliff in Nassau County, New York, United States. Serving as the village's seat of government, it houses Sea Cliff Village Hall, the Sea Cliff Public Library, and the Sea Cliff Village Museum.

== Description ==
The complex is a grouping of three functional units in two interconnected buildings originally built in 1914 as the Sea Cliff Methodist Church, Sunday School / Chapel, and Rectory. It is constructed of beige brick with cast stone accents and slate-covered roofs in the Late Gothic Revival or Collegiate Gothic style. It features a square bell tower. The former rectory contains the museum and is a two-story rectangular building in the Tudor Revival style.

It was listed on both the New York State Register of Historic Places and the National Register of Historic Places in 2005.

== See also ==
- National Register of Historic Places listings in Oyster Bay (town), New York
- Bellerose Village Municipal Complex
