= Bellerose Village Municipal Complex =

- U.S. National Register of Historic Places
- New York State Register of Historic Places
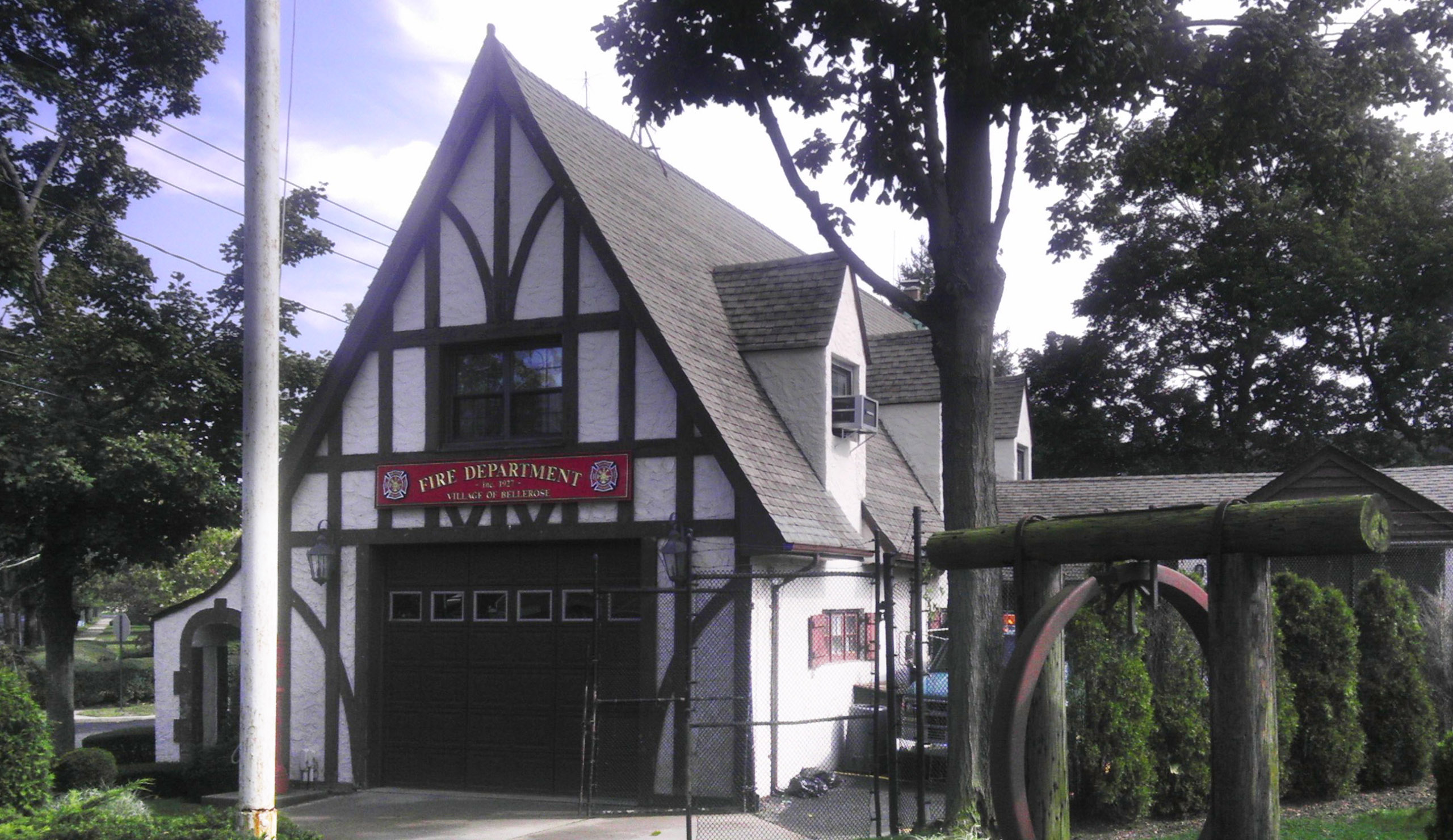

- Location within New York Location within the United States
- Location: 50 Superior Rd. and Magee Plaza, Bellerose, New York
- Coordinates: 40°43′21.5″N 73°42′59″W
- Built: 1930
- Architect: Anthony Waldeier
- Architectural style: Tudor Revival, Colonial Revival
- NRHP reference No.: 06000889

Significant dates
- Added to NRHP: September 28, 2006
- Designated NYSRHP: August 1, 2006

The Bellerose Village Municipal Complex is a municipal government office complex & civic center located at 50 Superior Road and Magee Plaza in the Village of Bellerose, in Nassau County, New York, United States.

== Description ==
Designed by architect Anthony Waldeier in a combined Tudor Revival/Colonial Revival style, the Bellerose Village Municipal Complex consists of Bellerose Village Hall, the Bellerose Women's Club Building, the Bellerose Fire Hall, and the Bellerose Police Booth.

On August 1, 2006, it was listed on the New York State Register of Historic Places. One month later, on September 28, 2006, it was added to the National Register of Historic Places.

== See also ==
- National Register of Historic Places listings in Hempstead (town), New York
- Sea Cliff Village Hall, Library and Museum Complex
