= House at 52 Eighteenth Avenue =

Historic house in New York, United States

- U.S. National Register of Historic Places
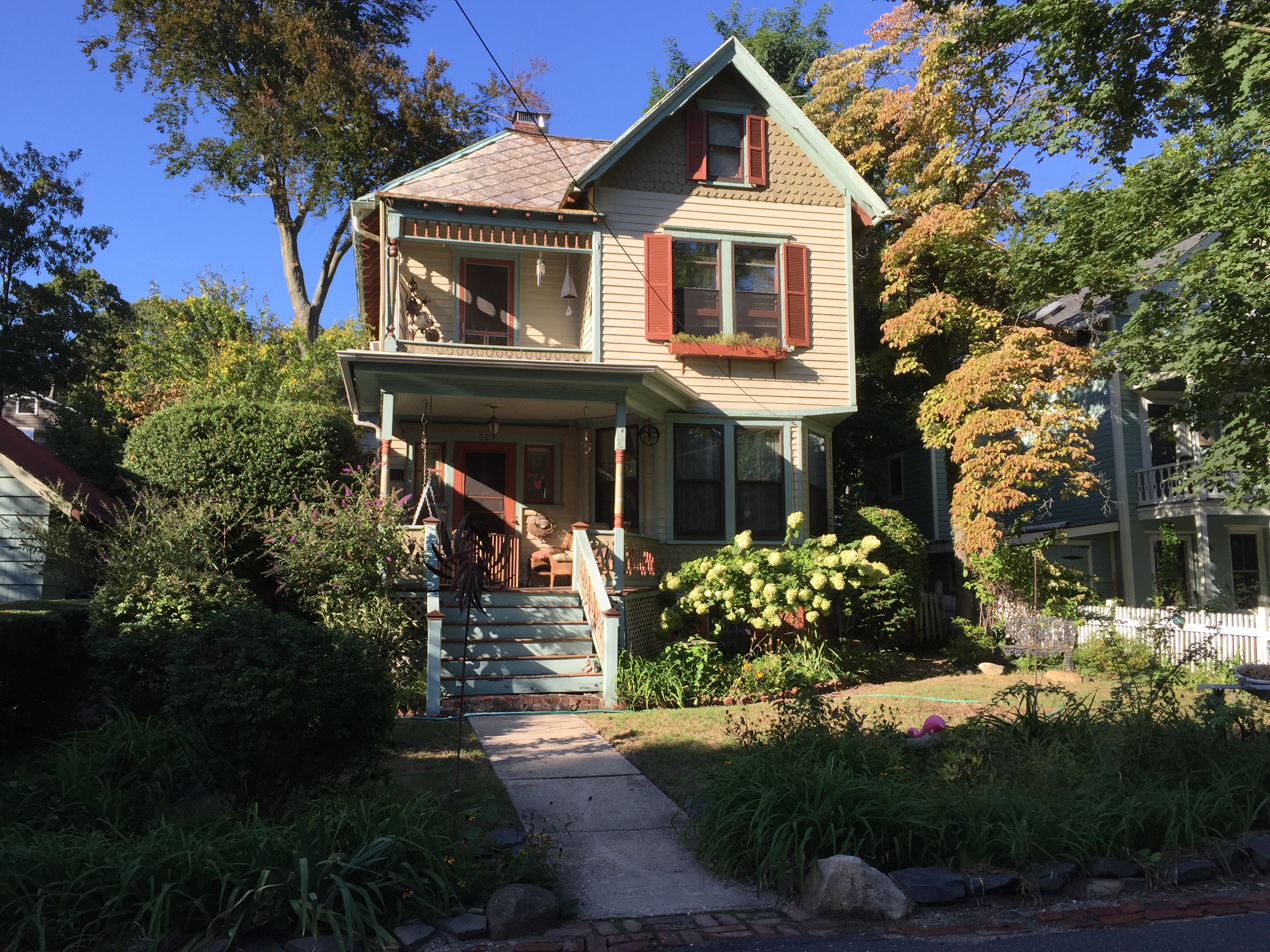

- Location within New York Location within the United States
- Location: 52 Eighteenth Ave., Sea Cliff, New York
- Coordinates: 40°50′48″N 73°39′1″W
- Area: 0.1 acres (0.040 ha)
- Built: 1895
- Architect: Maidment, William
- Architectural style: Late Victorian
- MPS: Sea Cliff Summer Resort TR
- NRHP reference No.: 88000032
- Added to NRHP: February 18, 1988

The house at 52 Eighteenth Avenue is a historic home located at Sea Cliff in Nassau County, New York. It was built in 1895 and is a two-story clapboard-sided residence with a slate-covered hipped roof in the Late Victorian style. It features a raised front porch with lattice work and a two-story bay window.

It was listed on the National Register of Historic Places in 1988. It was included in a study covering the Sea Cliff Summer Resort area as a "Thematic Group".
