= House at 112 Sea Cliff Avenue =

Historic house in New York, United States

- U.S. National Register of Historic Places
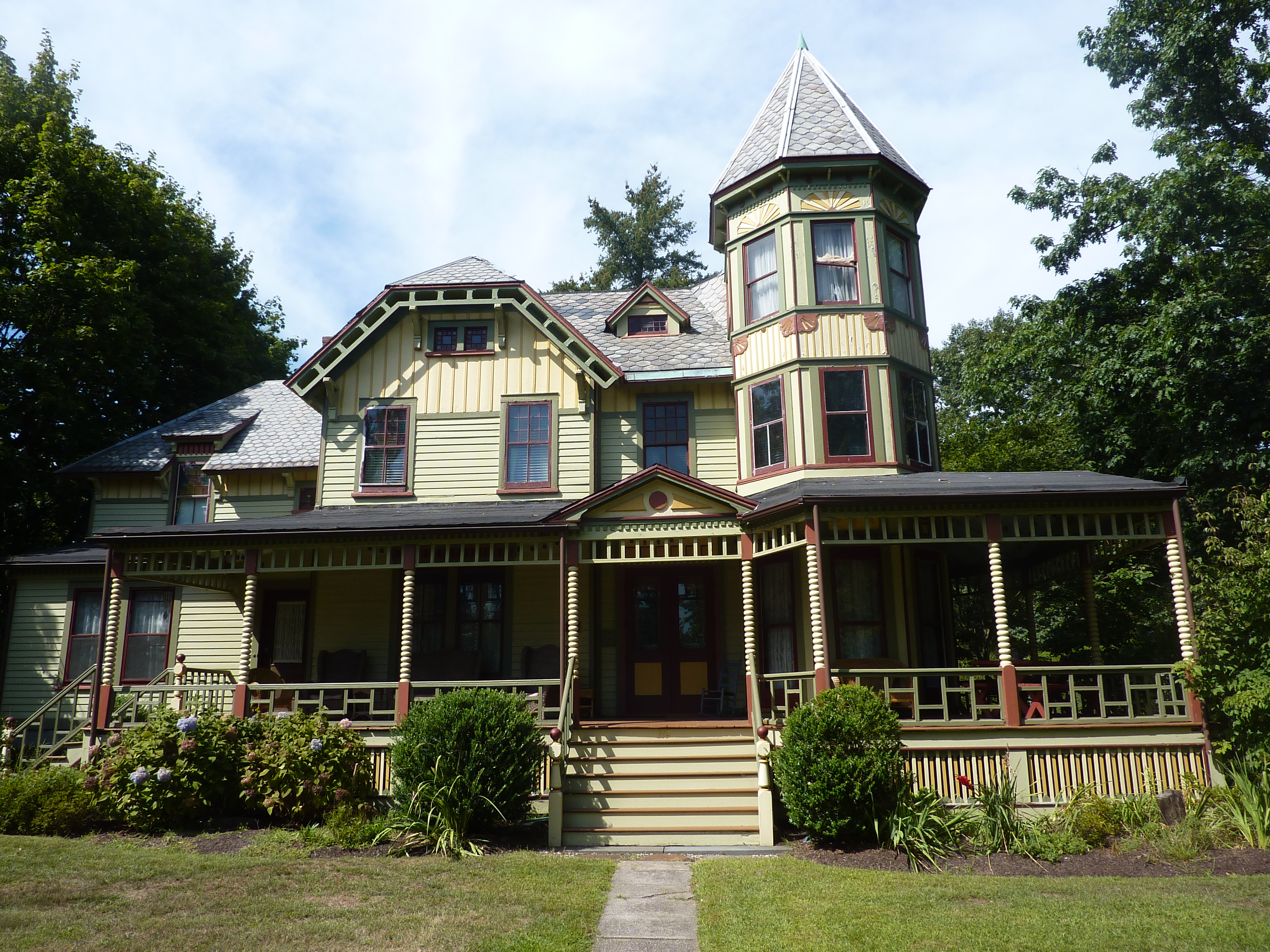

- Location within New York Location within the United States
- Location: 112 Sea Cliff Ave., Sea Cliff, New York
- Coordinates: 40°50′59″N 73°38′28″W
- Area: less than one acre
- Built: 1884
- Architectural style: Queen Anne
- MPS: Sea Cliff Summer Resort TR
- NRHP reference No.: 88000015
- Added to NRHP: February 18, 1988

112 Sea Cliff Avenue is a historic home located at Sea Cliff in Nassau County, New York. It is a 2 1/2-story, irregularly shaped building dominated by a 3-story, octagonal tower with a tent roof in the Queen Anne style. The original section was built in 1884, and the eastern extension and tower added in 1887. The main facade features a projecting two-bay cross-gable with a jerkin head roof.

It was listed on the National Register of Historic Places in 1988. It was included in a study covering the Sea Cliff Summer Resort area as a "Thematic Group".
