= Central Hall (Sea Cliff, New York) =

Historic commercial building in New York, United States

- U.S. National Register of Historic Places
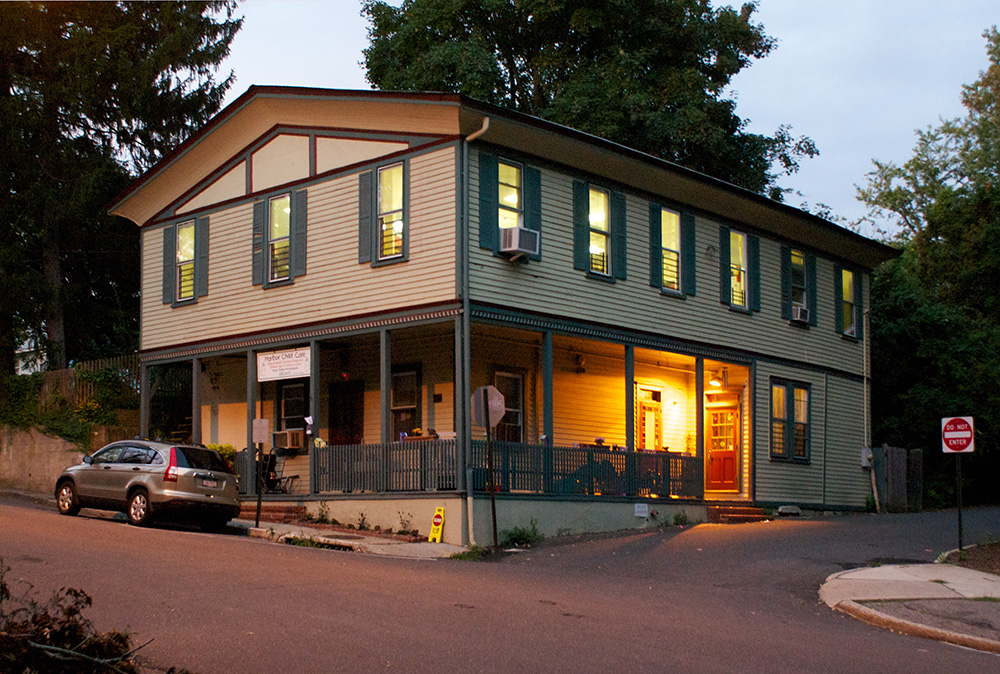

- Location within New York Location within the United States
- Location: 93 Central Avenue, Sea Cliff, New York
- Coordinates: 40°50′54″N 73°38′54″W
- Area: 0.1 acres (0.040 ha)
- Built: 1894
- Architect: Maidment, Fred; Maidment, William
- MPS: Sea Cliff Summer Resort TR
- NRHP reference No.: 88000019
- Added to NRHP: February 18, 1988

Central Hall is a historic commercial building located at Sea Cliff in Nassau County, New York. It was built in 1894 and is a two-story, clapboard sided building with a low gable roof. It originally served as a dry goods store and community meeting hall.

The structure was listed on the National Register of Historic Places in 1988. It was included in a study covering the Sea Cliff Summer Resort area as a "Thematic Group".
