= House at 240 Sea Cliff Avenue =

Historic house in New York, United States

- U.S. National Register of Historic Places
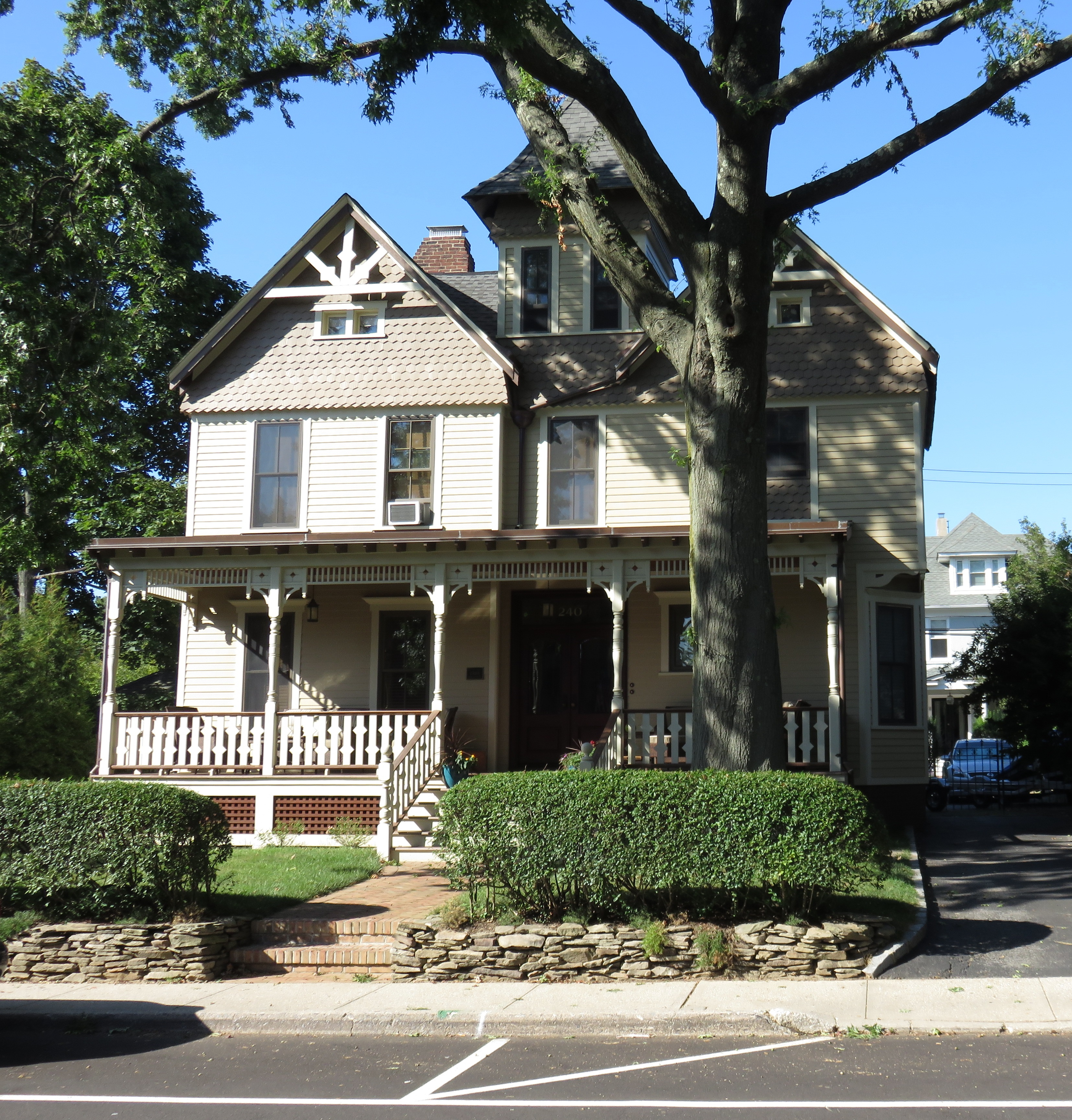

- Location within New York Location within the United States
- Location: 240 Sea Cliff Ave., Sea Cliff, New York
- Coordinates: 40°50′57.7746″N 73°38′44.1384″W
- Area: less than one acre
- Built: 1888
- Architectural style: Late Victorian, Eclectic
- MPS: Sea Cliff Summer Resort TR
- NRHP reference No.: 88000006
- Added to NRHP: February 18, 1988

House at 240 Sea Cliff Avenue is a historic home located at Sea Cliff in Nassau County, New York. It was built in 1888 and is an irregularly shaped, 2 1/2-story house with a multiple cross-gabled roof in the Late Victorian style. The 2 1/2-story, gable-roofed east wing was added in 1908. It features a 3-story central tower with a tent roof.

It was listed on the National Register of Historic Places in 1988. It was included in a study covering the Sea Cliff Summer Resort area as a "Thematic Group".
