= St. Luke's Protestant Episcopal Church (Sea Cliff, New York) =

Historic church in New York, United States

- U.S. National Register of Historic Places
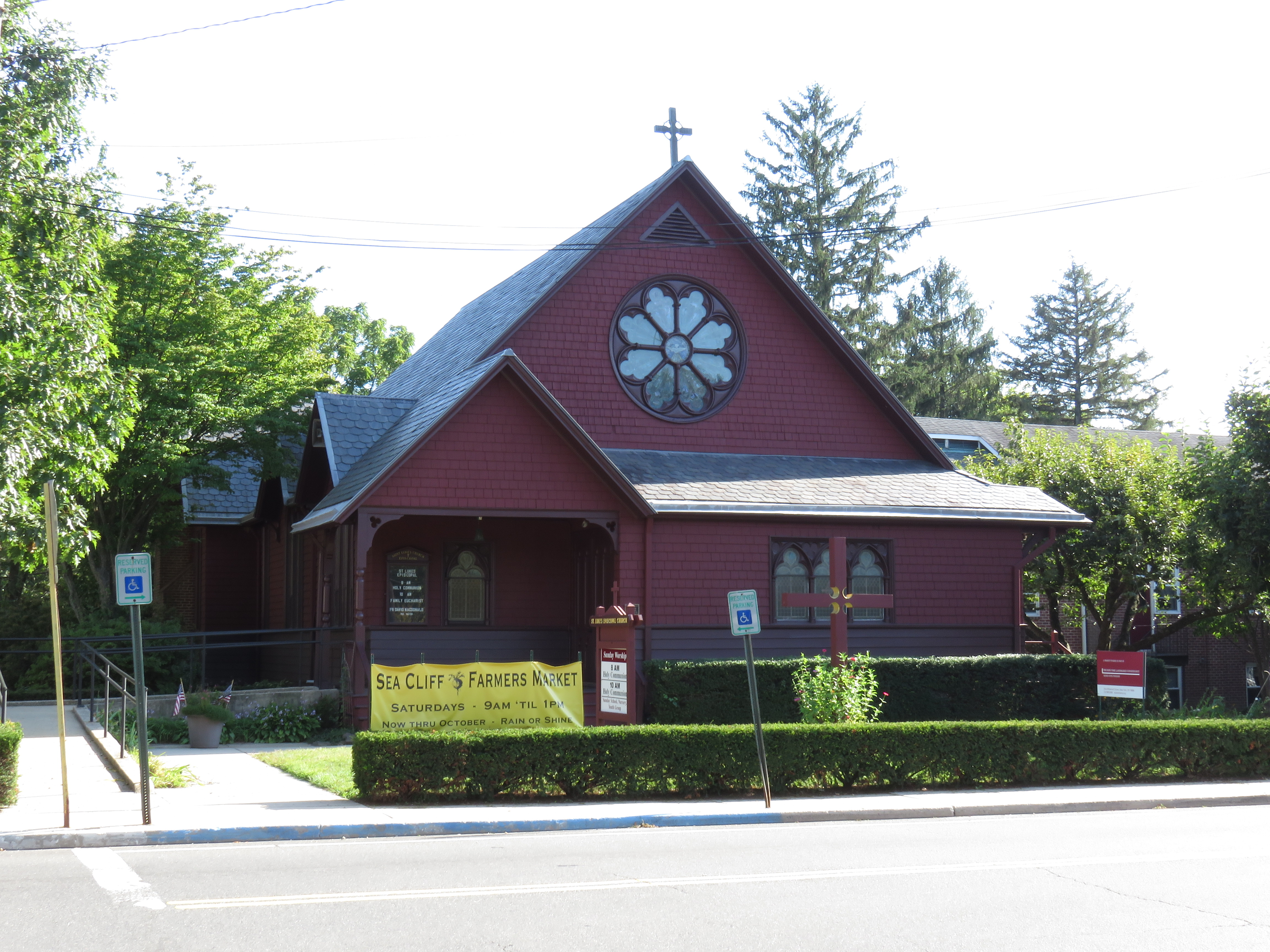

- Location within New York Location within the United States
- Location: 253 Glen St., Sea Cliff, New York
- Coordinates: 40°50′49″N 73°38′44″W
- Area: less than one acre
- Built: 1892–1894
- Architect: Sibell, H. Gardner; Miller, Charles E.
- Architectural style: Late Victorian
- MPS: Sea Cliff Summer Resort TR
- NRHP reference No.: 88000017
- Added to NRHP: February 18, 1988

St. Luke's Protestant Episcopal Church is a historic Episcopal church at 253 Glen Street in Sea Cliff, Nassau County, New York. The congregation was formed in 1889.

Completed in 1894, the church building is a 1 1/2-story, shingled and clapboard structure with a steeply pitched slate-covered gable roof. It bears the distinctive characteristics of the Queen Anne style of architecture.

It was listed on the National Register of Historic Places in 1988. It was included in a study covering the Sea Cliff Summer Resort area as a "Thematic Group".
