= Crowell House (Sea Cliff, New York) =

Historic house in New York, United States

- U.S. National Register of Historic Places
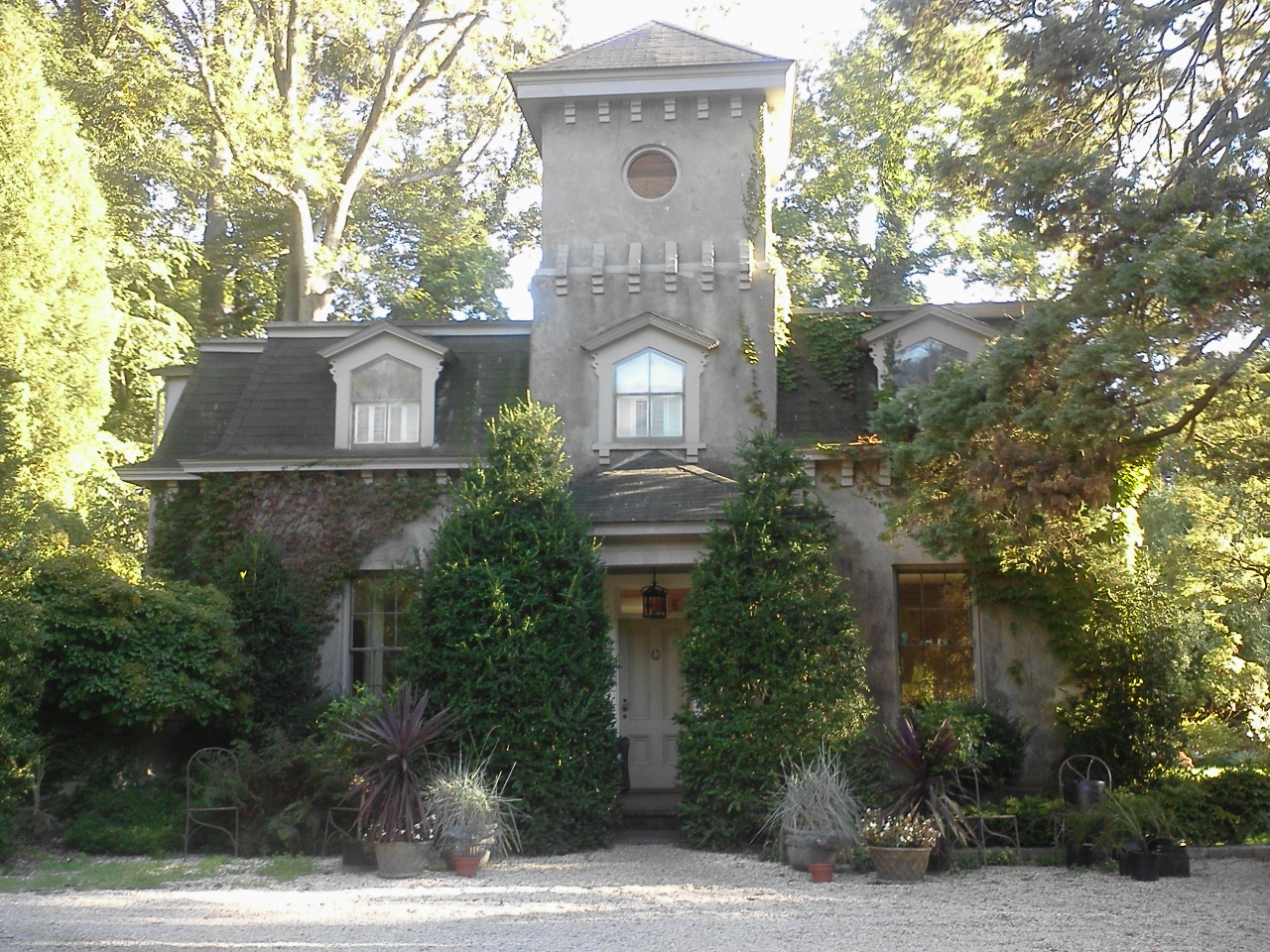

- Location within New York Location within the United States
- Location: 375 Littleworth La., Sea Cliff, New York
- Coordinates: 40°50′20″N 73°38′55″W
- Area: less than one acre
- Built: 1871
- Architectural style: Second Empire
- MPS: Sea Cliff Summer Resort TR
- NRHP reference No.: 88000020
- Added to NRHP: February 18, 1988

Crowell House is a historic home located at Sea Cliff in Nassau County, New York. It was built in 1871 and is a 1 1/2-story, rectangular building with 12-inch poured concrete walls and a mansard roof in the Second Empire style. It features a 2 1/2-story square tower with a tent roof.

It was listed on the National Register of Historic Places in 1988. It was included in a study covering the Sea Cliff Summer Resort area as a "Thematic Group".
