= House at 176 Prospect Avenue =

Historic house in New York, United States

- U.S. National Register of Historic Places
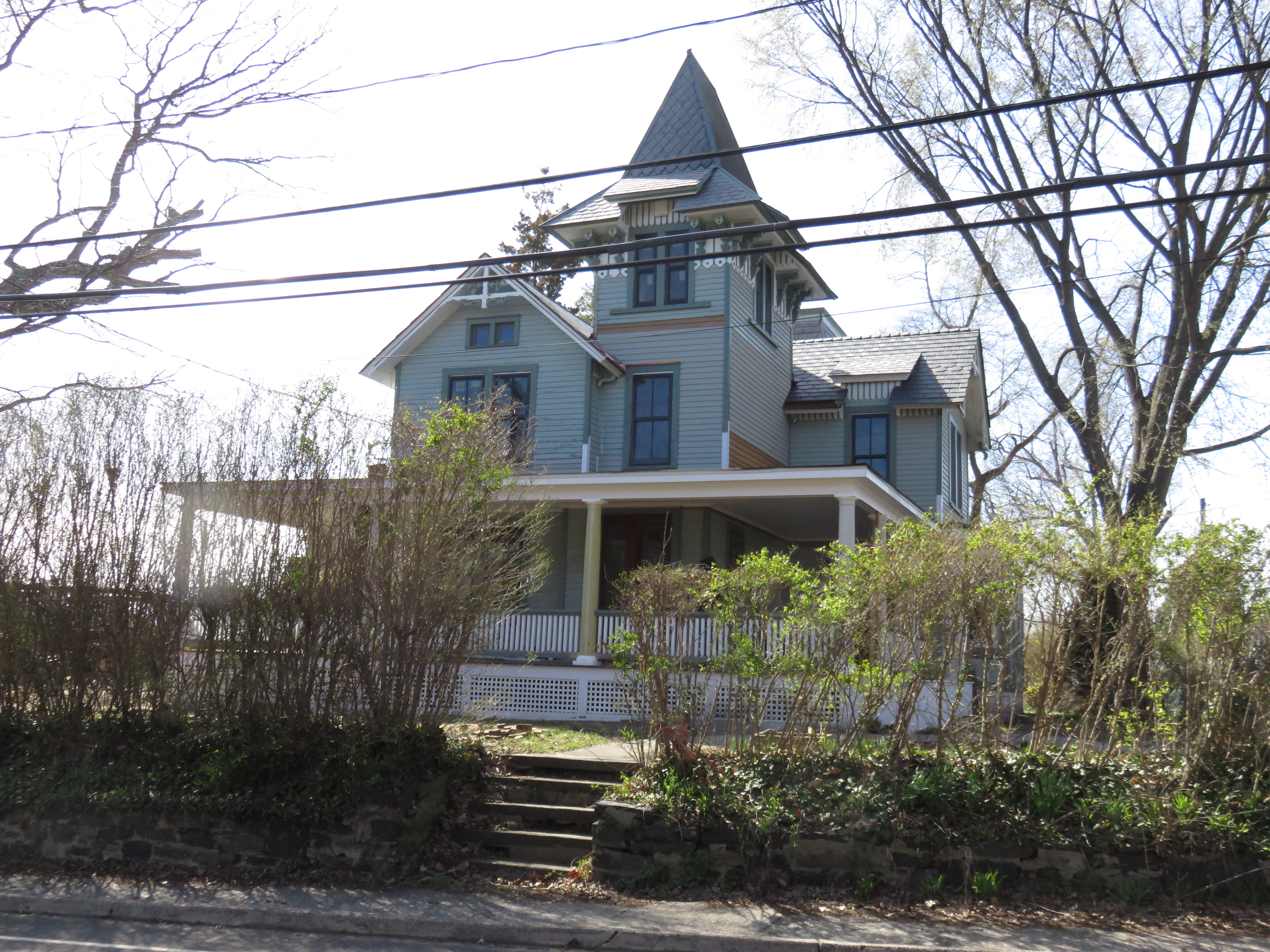

- Location within New York Location within the United States
- Location: 176 Prospect Ave., Sea Cliff, New York
- Coordinates: 40°50′54″N 73°39′3″W
- Area: less than one acre
- Built: 1886
- Architectural style: Queen Anne
- MPS: Sea Cliff Summer Resort TR
- NRHP reference No.: 88000012
- Added to NRHP: February 18, 1988

House at 176 Prospect Avenue is a historic home located at Sea Cliff in Nassau County, New York. It was built in 1886 and is a 2 1/2-story, clapboard residence with a cross-gable, slate-covered roof in the Queen Anne style. It features a 3-story square tower with a hipped roof and board and batten cornice.

It was listed on the National Register of Historic Places in 1988. It was included in a study covering the Sea Cliff Summer Resort area as a "Thematic Group".
