= House at 378 Glen Avenue =

Historic house in New York, United States

- U.S. National Register of Historic Places
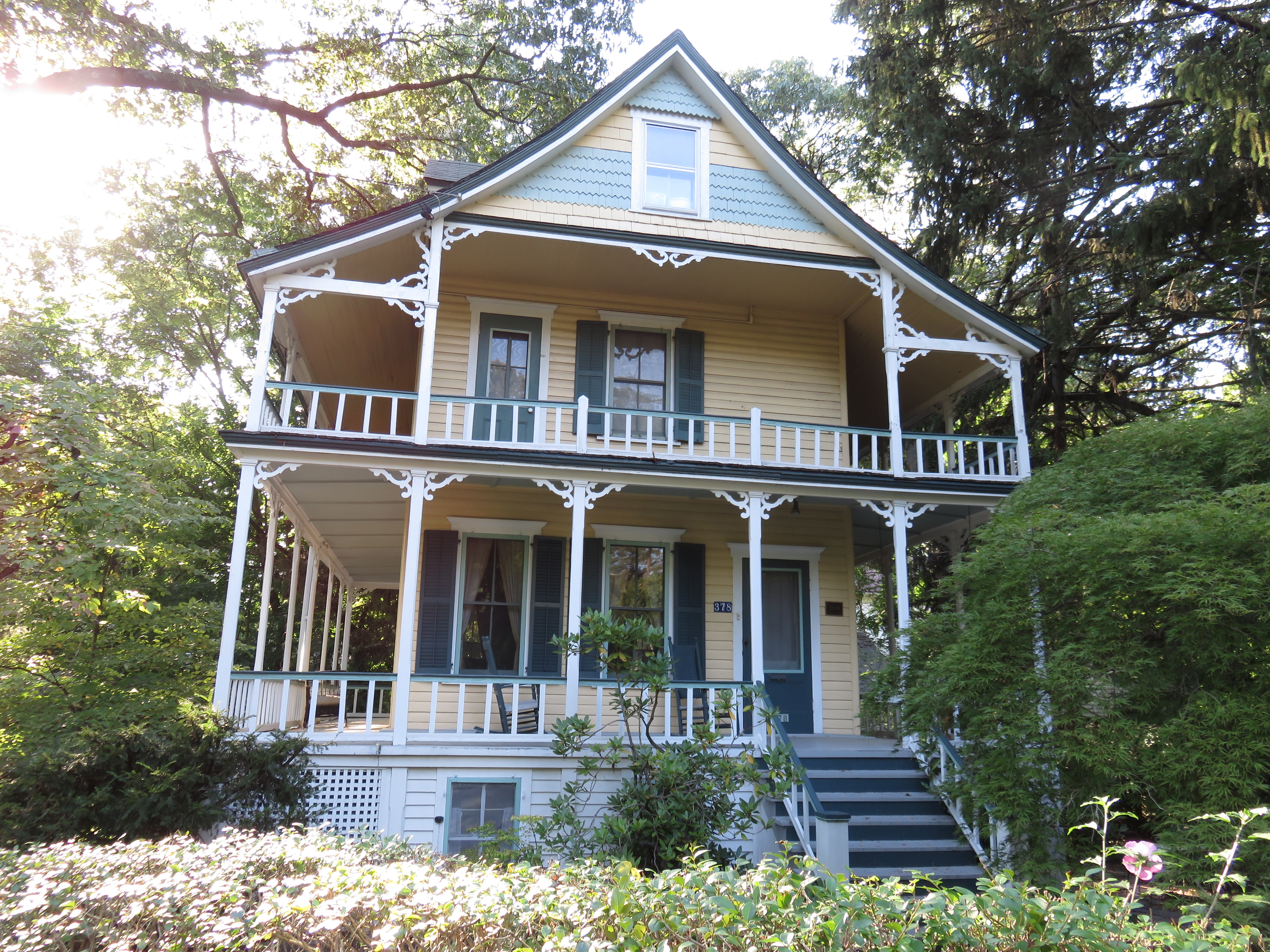

- Location within New York Location within the United States
- Location: 378 Glen Ave., Sea Cliff, New York
- Coordinates: 40°50′44″N 73°39′4″W
- Area: less than one acre
- Built: 1886
- Architectural style: Late Victorian
- MPS: Sea Cliff Summer Resort TR
- NRHP reference No.: 88000033
- Added to NRHP: February 18, 1988

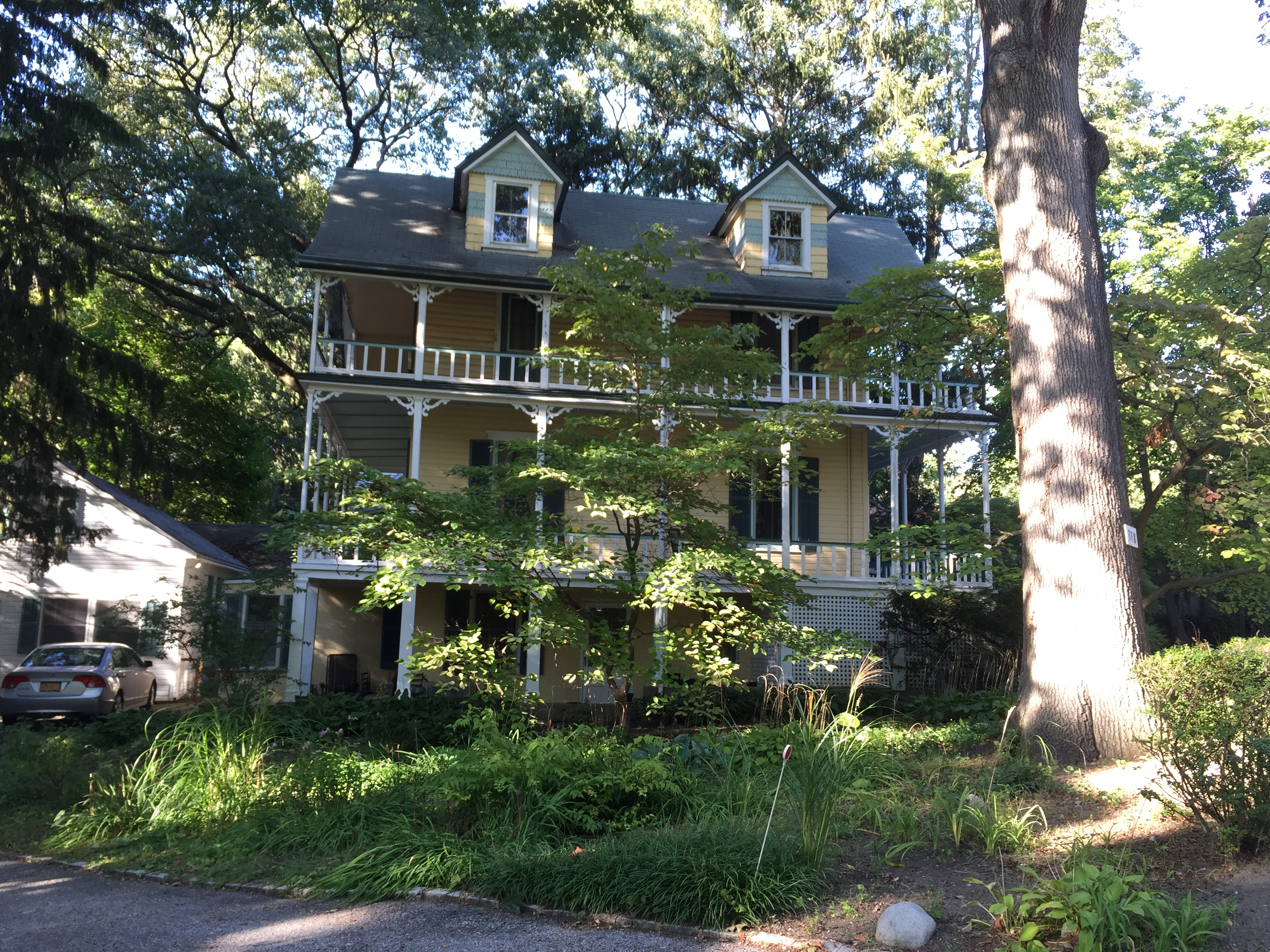
Side of the house

House at 378 Glen Avenue is a historic home located at Sea Cliff in Nassau County, New York. It was built in 1886 and is a two-story clapboard-sided residence with a sweeping gable roof in the Late Victorian style. It features a two-storey porch that surrounds the building and has lattice work on the first floor, scrollsawn corner braces, balustrade, and decorative detailing.

It was listed on the National Register of Historic Places in 1988. It was included in a study covering the Sea Cliff Summer Resort area as a "Thematic Group".
