= House at 173 Sixteenth Avenue =

Historic house in New York, United States

- U.S. National Register of Historic Places
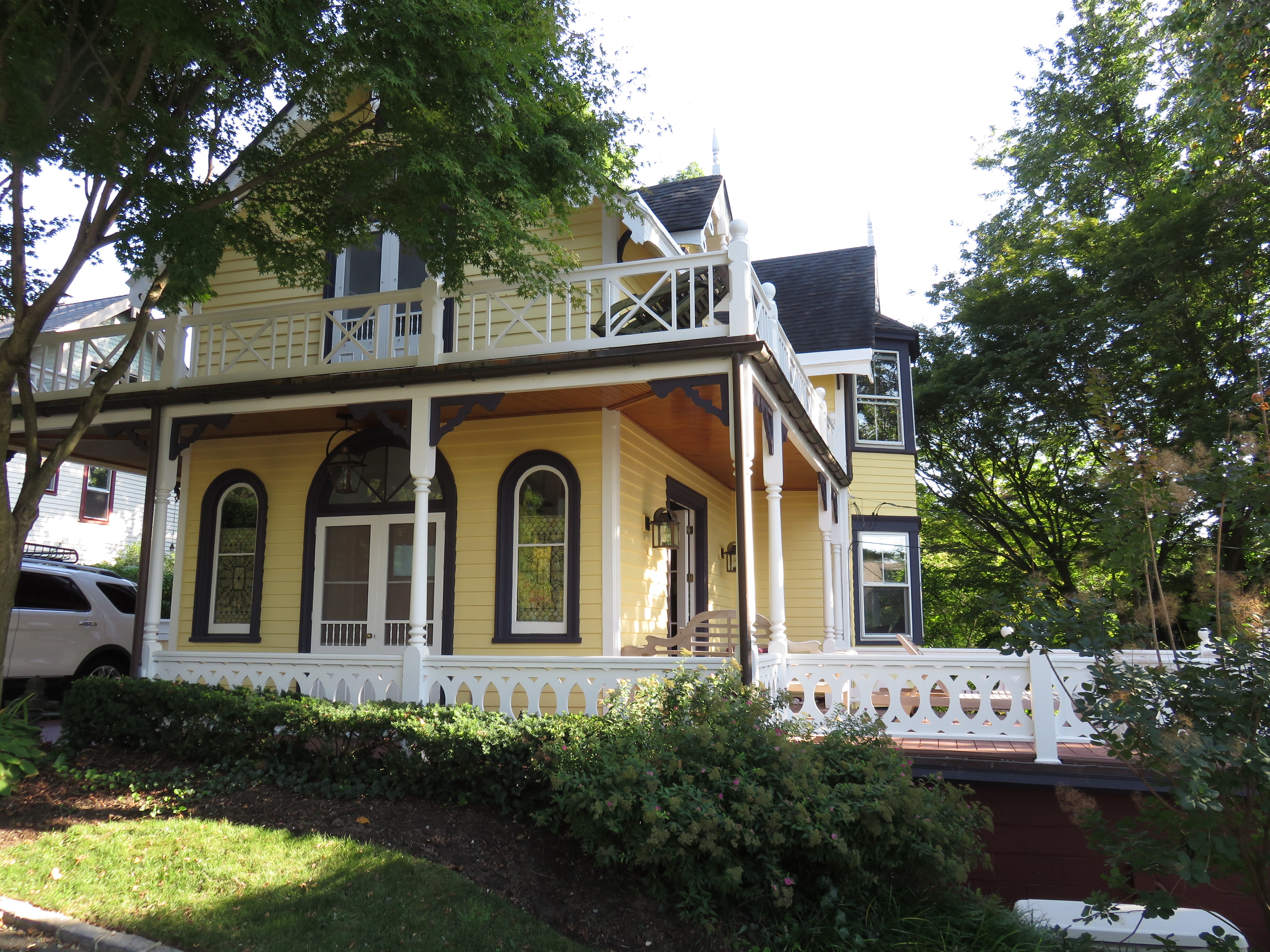

- Location within New York Location within the United States
- Location: 173 Sixteenth Ave., Sea Cliff, New York
- Coordinates: 40°50′51″N 73°39′10″W
- Area: 0.3 acres (0.12 ha)
- Built: 1880
- Architectural style: Gothic
- MPS: Sea Cliff Summer Resort TR
- NRHP reference No.: 88000013
- Added to NRHP: February 18, 1988

House at 173 Sixteenth Avenue is a historic home located at Sea Cliff in Nassau County, New York. It was built about 1880 and is a 1 1/2-story, cruciform clapboard residence with a cross-gable roof. It features a two-tiered wraparound porch and Gothic details.

It was listed on the National Register of Historic Places in 1988. It was included in a study covering the Sea Cliff Summer Resort area as a "Thematic Group".
