= House at 103 Roslyn Avenue =

Historic house in New York, United States

- U.S. National Register of Historic Places
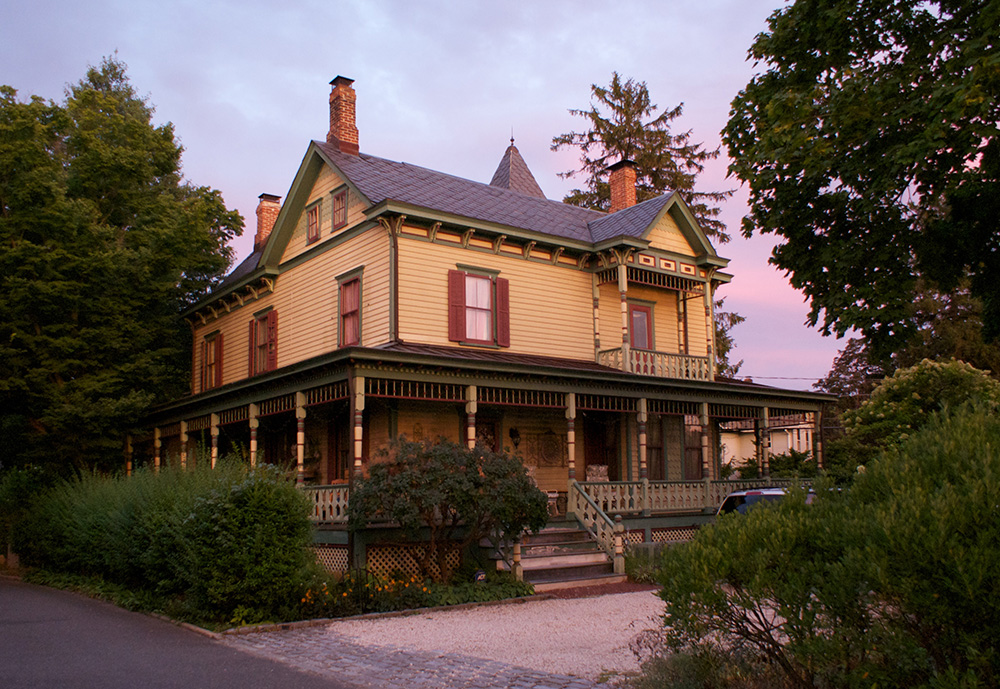

- Location within New York Location within the United States
- Location: 103 Roslyn Ave., Sea Cliff, New York
- Coordinates: 40°50′51″N 73°38′43″W
- Area: less than one acre
- Built: 1884
- Architect: Smith, W.H.
- Architectural style: Queen Anne
- MPS: Sea Cliff Summer Resort TR
- NRHP reference No.: 88000018
- Added to NRHP: February 18, 1988

House at 103 Roslyn Avenue is a historic home located at Sea Cliff in Nassau County, New York. It was built in 1884 and is a two-story, clapboard-sided residence with a cross-gable, slate-covered roof in the Queen Anne style. It features a three-story square tower with a pyramidal roof and a "wraparound shed roof" porch. It includes "three decorative corbelled chimneys".

It was listed on the National Register of Historic Places in 1988 as "House at 103 Roslyn Avenue".

It was included in a study covering the Sea Cliff Summer Resort area as a "Thematic Group".
