= House at 65 Twentieth Avenue =

Historic house in New York, United States

- U.S. National Register of Historic Places
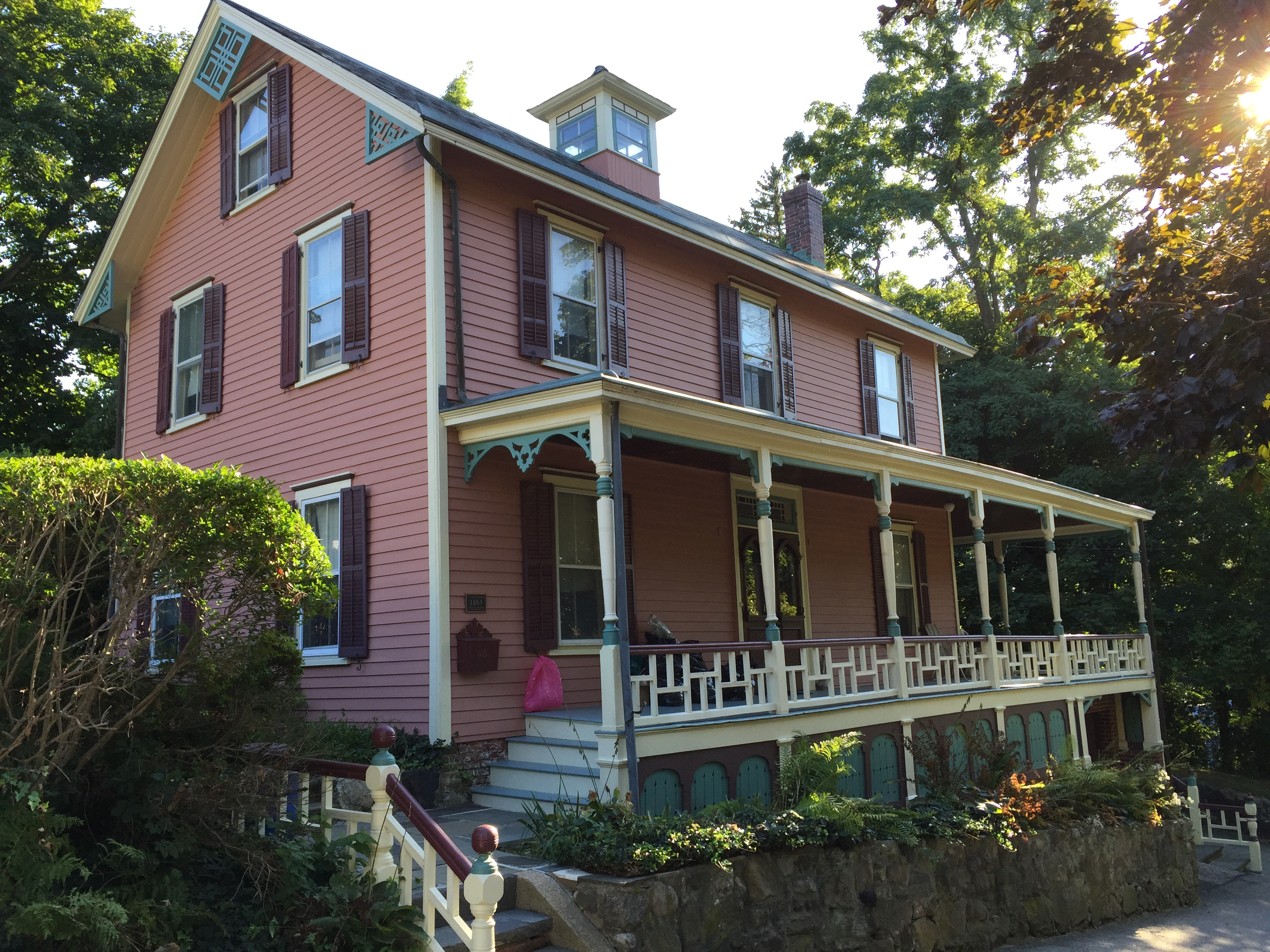

- Location within New York Location within the United States
- Location: 65 Twentieth Avenue, Sea Cliff, New York
- Coordinates: 40°50′45″N 73°39′9″W
- Area: less than one acre
- Built: 1893
- Architectural style: Late Victorian
- MPS: Sea Cliff Summer Resort TR
- NRHP reference No.: 88000001
- Added to NRHP: February 18, 1988

House at 65 Twentieth Avenue is a historic home located at Sea Cliff in Nassau County, New York. It was built in 1893 as a carriage house and converted to a summer residence in 1900. It remained as such until in 1946, when it was converted to its current status as a year-round residence.

It is a two-story, clapboard-sided building on a brick foundation with a gable roof and a cupola in the Late Victorian style.

The building was listed on the National Register of Historic Places in 1988. It was included in a study covering the Sea Cliff Summer Resort area as a "Thematic Group".
