= House at 115 Central Avenue =

Historic house in New York, United States

- U.S. National Register of Historic Places
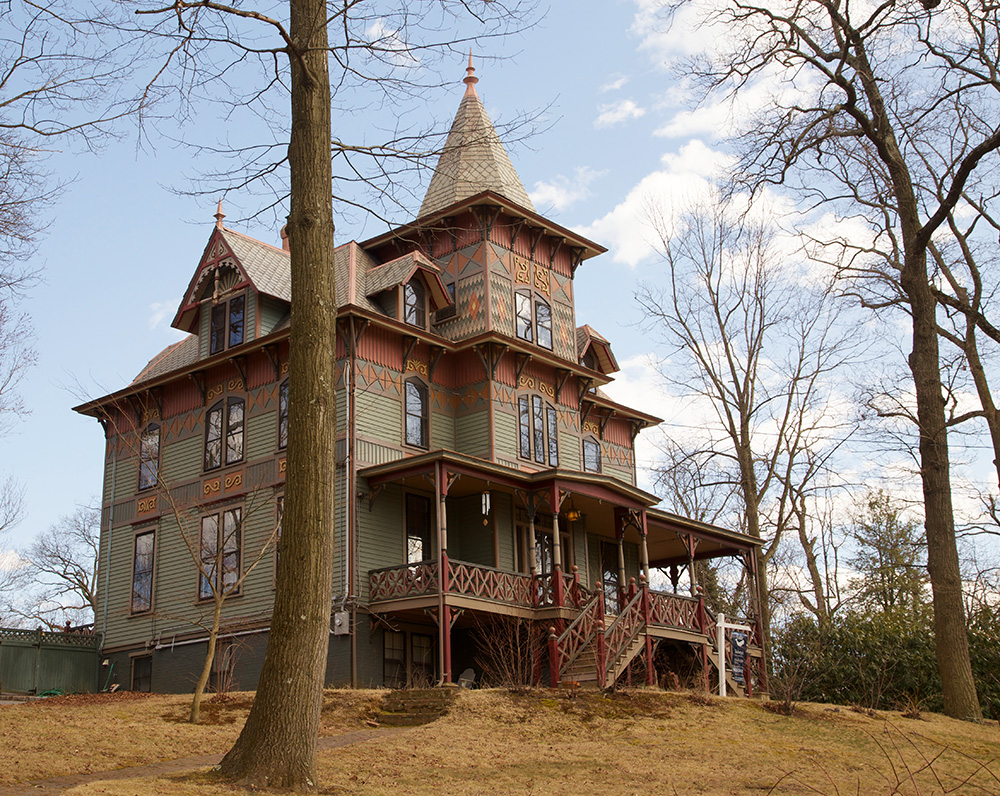
- "The Woodshed" in Sea Cliff, New York

- Location within New York Location within the United States
- Location: 115 Central Ave., Sea Cliff, New York
- Coordinates: 40°50′49″N 73°38′53″W
- Area: less than one acre
- Built: 1890
- Architect: Combs, Oliver
- Architectural style: Stick/Eastlake
- MPS: Sea Cliff Summer Resort TR
- NRHP reference No.: 88000014
- Added to NRHP: February 18, 1988

House at 115 Central Avenue is a historic home located at Sea Cliff in Nassau County, New York. It is a 2 1/2-story building with a full raised basement and a 3 1/2-story central tower with polygonal roof in the Queen Anne style. It has a decorative slate hipped roof with gable and jerkin head dormers and features a variety of exterior decorative details.

It was listed on the National Register of Historic Places in 1988. It was included in a study covering the Sea Cliff Summer Resort area as a "Thematic Group".
