= Stephen Harding House =

Historic house in New York, United States

- U.S. National Register of Historic Places
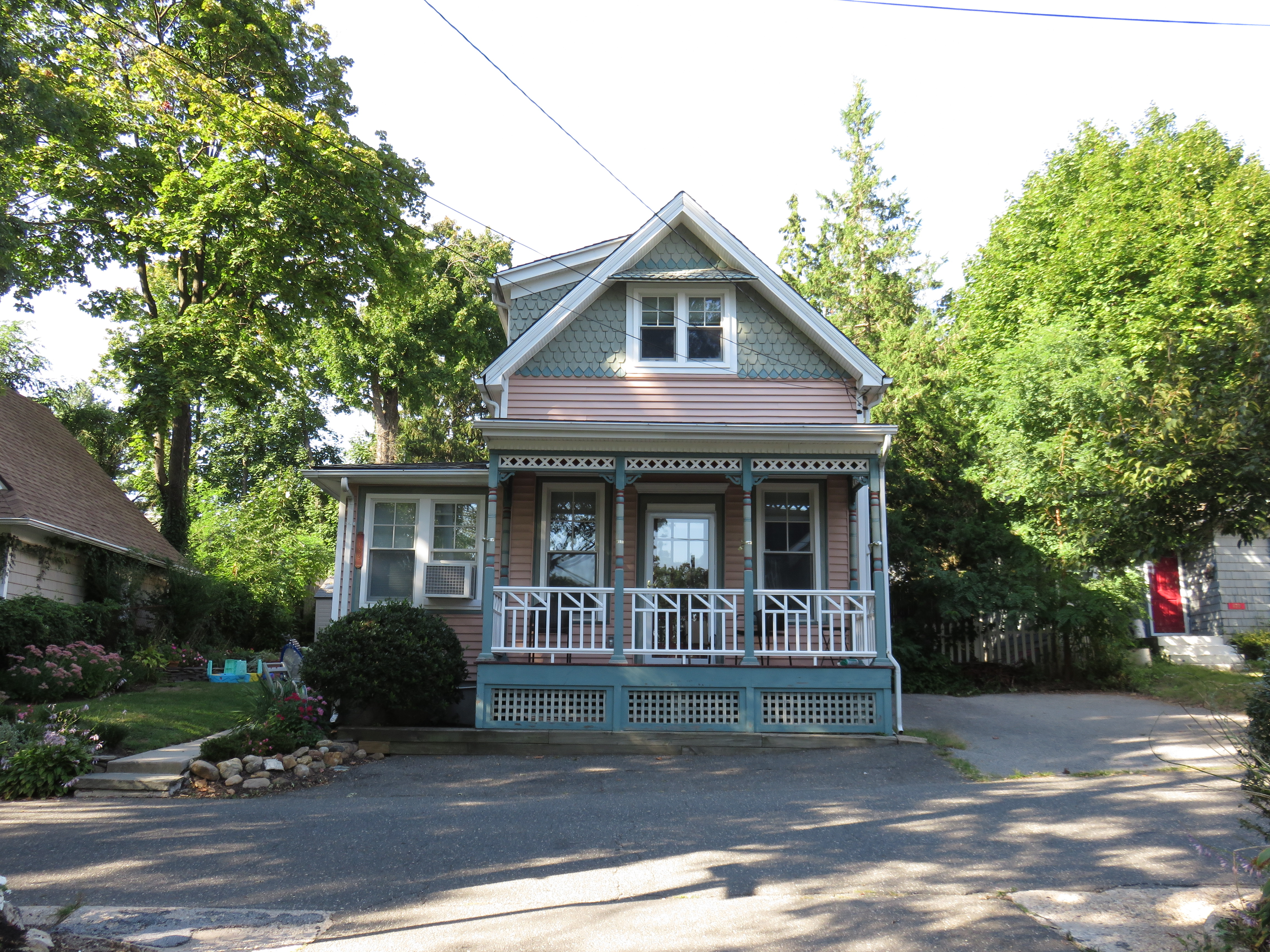
- Stephen Harding House, September 2015

- Location within New York Location within the United States
- Location: 182 14th Ave., Sea Cliff, New York
- Coordinates: 40°50′54″N 73°38′58″W
- Area: Less than 1 acre (0.40 ha)
- Built: 1878, 1911
- Architect: Stephen Harding
- Architectural style: Vernacular Queen Anne
- NRHP reference No.: 11000597
- Added to NRHP: August 24, 2011

Stephen Harding House is a historic home located at Sea Cliff in Nassau County, New York. It was built in 1878, and is a 1 1/2-story, rectangular balloon frame vernacular Queen Anne style cottage. It has three small one-story additions. It features a replacement front verandah with turned spindle supports and decorative frieze and railings and fishscale shingles on the gable ends. The cottage was built during the period when Sea Cliff functioned as a Methodist camp.

It was listed on the National Register of Historic Places in 2011.
