= House at 285 Sea Cliff Avenue =

Historic house in New York, United States

- U.S. National Register of Historic Places
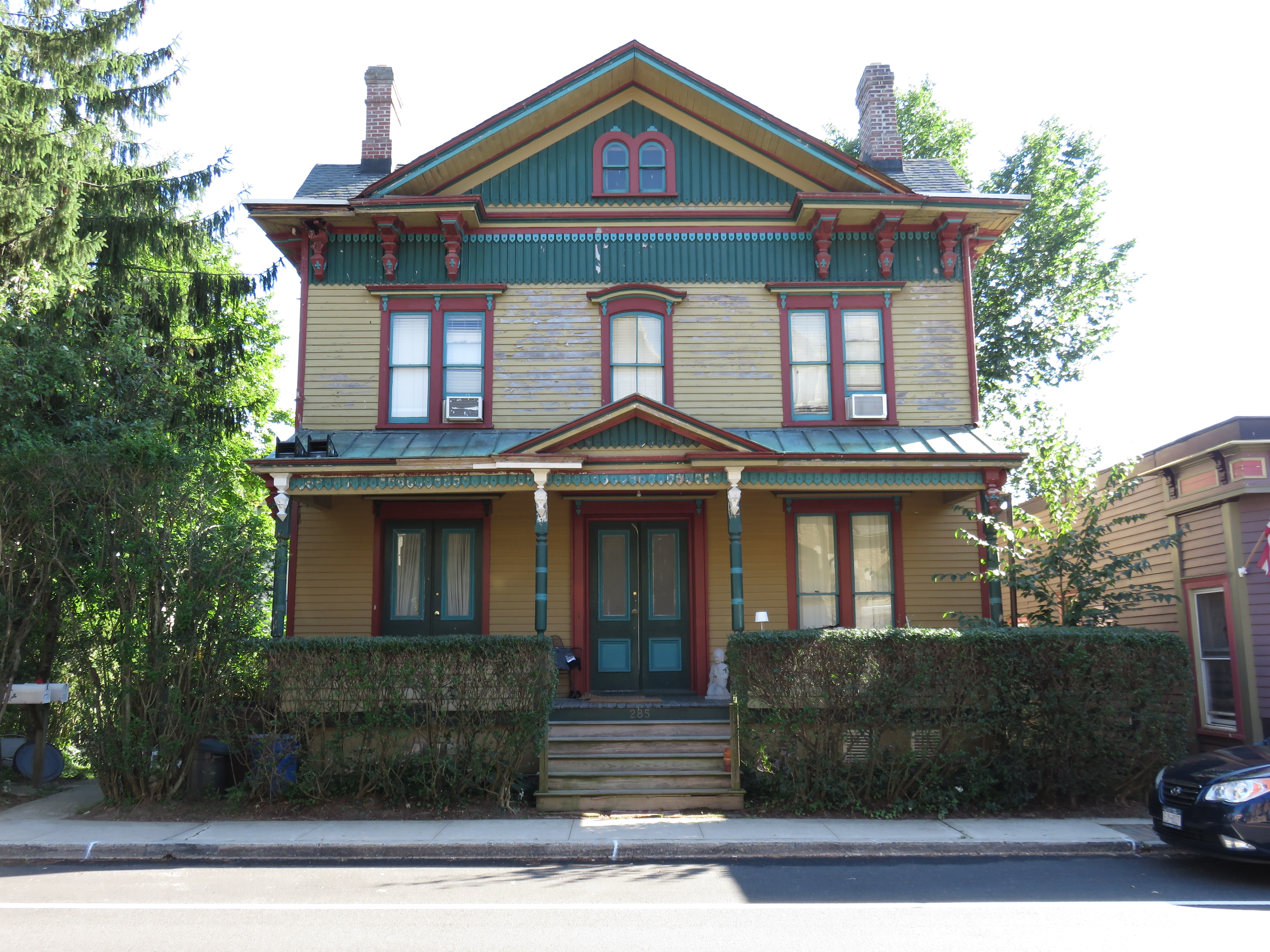

- Location within New York Location within the United States
- Location: 285 Sea Cliff Ave., Sea Cliff, New York
- Coordinates: 40°50′55″N 73°38′50″W
- Area: less than one acre
- Built: 1884
- Architect: Pearsall, Richard Seaman
- Architectural style: Italianate
- MPS: Sea Cliff Summer Resort TR
- NRHP reference No.: 88000005
- Added to NRHP: February 18, 1988

House at 285 Sea Cliff Avenue is a historic home located at Sea Cliff in Nassau County, New York. It was built in 1884 and is a 2 1/2-story clapboard house with a square plan and cross-gabled roof in the Italianate style. It features deep overhanging eaves with decorative scrollsawn brackets and round arched windows.

It was listed on the National Register of Historic Places in 1988. It was included in a study covering the Sea Cliff Summer Resort area as a "Thematic Group".
