= House at 332 Franklin Avenue =

Historic house in New York, United States

- U.S. National Register of Historic Places
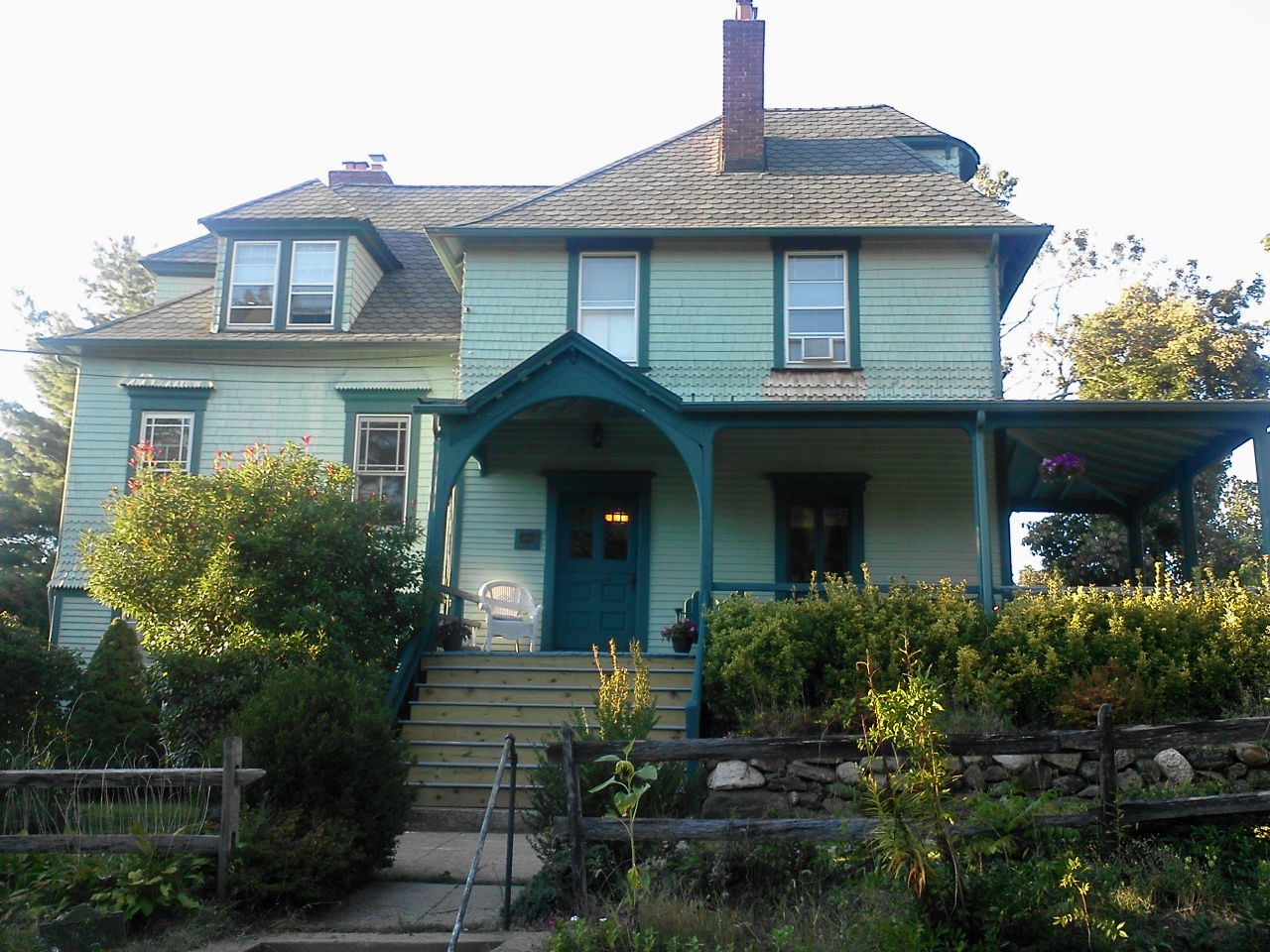

- Location within New York Location within the United States
- Location: 332 Franklin Ave., Sea Cliff, New York
- Coordinates: 40°50′42″N 73°39′3″W
- Area: less than one acre
- Built: 1888
- Architectural style: Queen Anne
- MPS: Sea Cliff Summer Resort TR
- NRHP reference No.: 88000038
- Added to NRHP: February 18, 1988

House at 332 Franklin Avenue is a historic home located at Sea Cliff in Nassau County, New York. It was built in 1888 and is a large two story clapboard and shingled house with a hipped roof in the Queen Anne style. It features a shed roofed wraparound porch on square posts and four tapered chimneys.

It was listed on the National Register of Historic Places in 1988. It was included in a study covering the Sea Cliff Summer Resort area as a "Thematic Group".
