= Christ Building (Sea Cliff, New York) =

Historic commercial building in New York, United States

- U.S. National Register of Historic Places
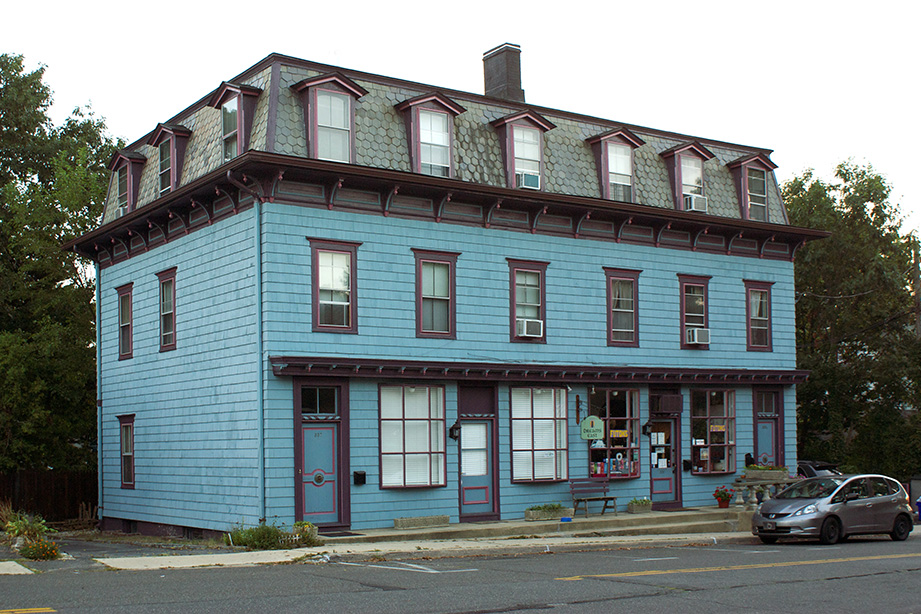
- Christ Building, September 2014

- Location within New York Location within the United States
- Location: 357-359 Sea Cliff Ave., Sea Cliff, New York
- Coordinates: 40°50′58″N 73°38′59″W
- Area: Less than 1 acre (0.40 ha)
- Built: c. 1880
- Architectural style: Second Empire
- NRHP reference No.: 11001002
- Added to NRHP: January 4, 2012

The Christ Building (also known as Harian's General Store) is a historic commercial building located at 357-359 Sea Cliff Avenue in Sea Cliff, Nassau County, New York.

== Description and history ==
It was built in about 1880, and is a three-story, Second Empire style frame building. It has a hexagonal slate mansard roof and is clad with wood shingles. The building houses a store on the first floor and two rental units on the upper floors. The building was built during the period when Sea Cliff functioned as a Methodist camp and originally housed a bakery and store on the first floor and boarding rooms on the upper floors.

It was listed on the National Register of Historic Places on January 4, 2012.
