= House at 137 Prospect Avenue =

Historic house in New York, United States

- U.S. National Register of Historic Places
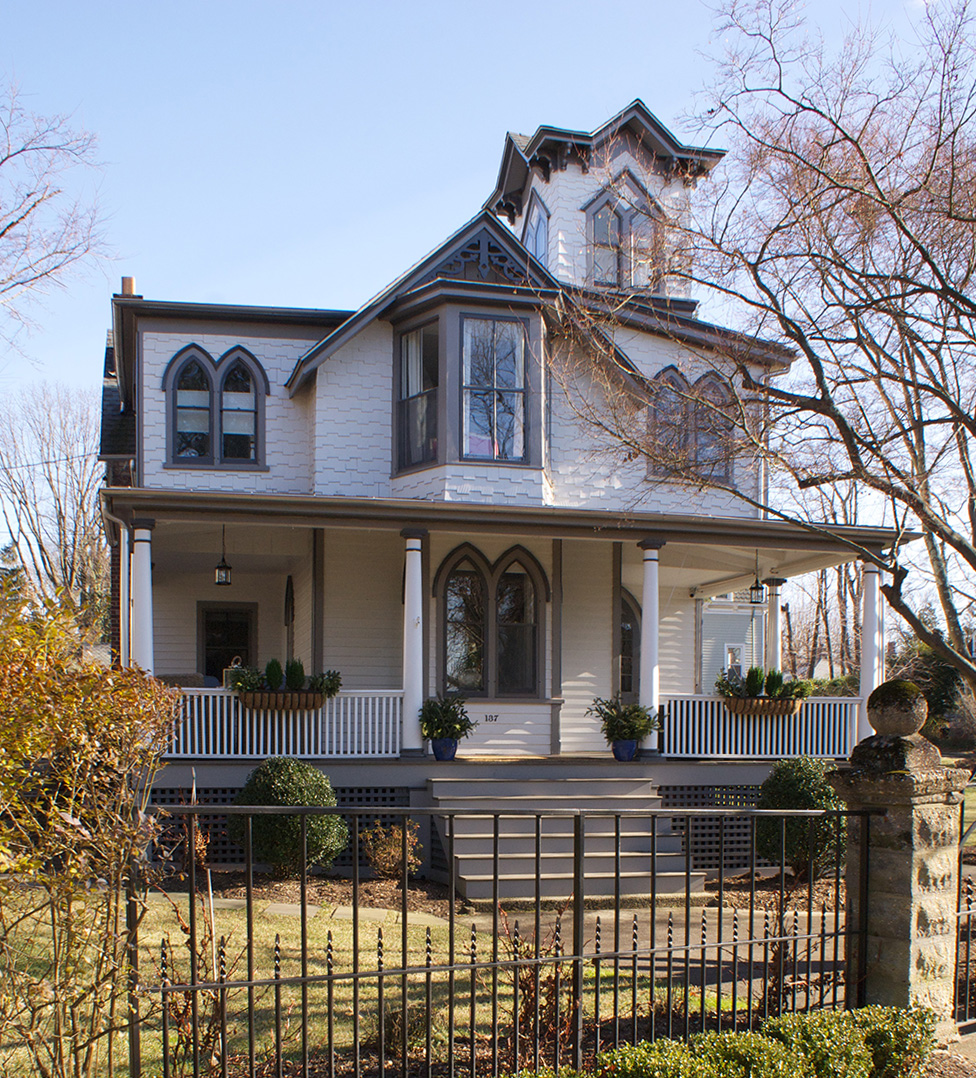

- Location within New York Location within the United States
- Location: 137 Prospect Ave., Sea Cliff, New York
- Coordinates: 40°50′54″N 73°39′2″W
- Area: less than one acre
- Built: 1875
- Architectural style: Late Victorian
- MPS: Sea Cliff Summer Resort TR
- NRHP reference No.: 88000016
- Added to NRHP: February 18, 1988

House at 137 Prospect Avenue is a historic home located at Sea Cliff in Nassau County, New York. It was built about 1875 and is a two-story, rectangular clapboard residence with a combination of a cross-gable and shallow hipped roof in the Late Victorian style. It features a three-story tower with a multi-gabled roof and bracketed overhanging eaves.

It was listed on the National Register of Historic Places in 1988. It was included in a study covering the Sea Cliff Summer Resort area as a "Thematic Group".
