= House at 9 Locust Place =

Historic house in New York, United States

- U.S. National Register of Historic Places
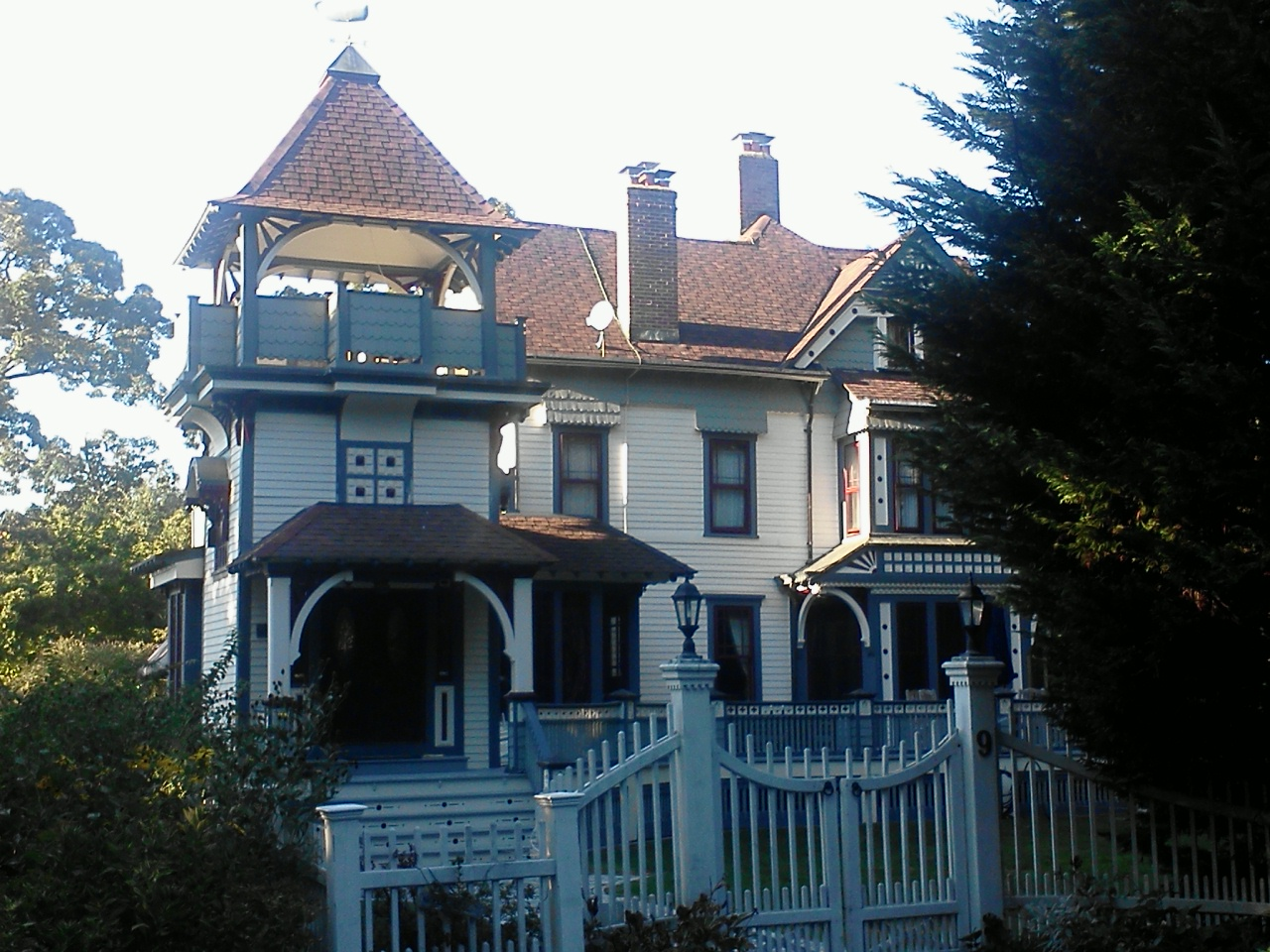

- Location within New York Location within the United States
- Location: 9 Locust Pl., Sea Cliff, New York
- Coordinates: 40°50′40″N 73°39′5″W
- Area: less than one acre
- Built: 1880
- Architectural style: Queen Anne
- MPS: Sea Cliff Summer Resort TR
- NRHP reference No.: 88000030
- Added to NRHP: February 18, 1988

9 Locust Place is a historic house located at the address of the same name in Sea Cliff, Nassau County, New York.

== Description and history ==
It was built in 1890, and is a large, three-story residence with a prominent cross-gable roof designed in the Queen Anne style. A porch and tower were added to the home in 1978; a kitchen extension was added in 2015. Also on the property is a two-bay brick garage built in 1918.

It was listed on the National Register of Historic Places on February 18, 1988. It was included in a study covering the Sea Cliff Summer Resort area as a "Thematic Group".
