= House at 207 Carpenter Avenue =

Historic house in New York, United States

- U.S. National Register of Historic Places
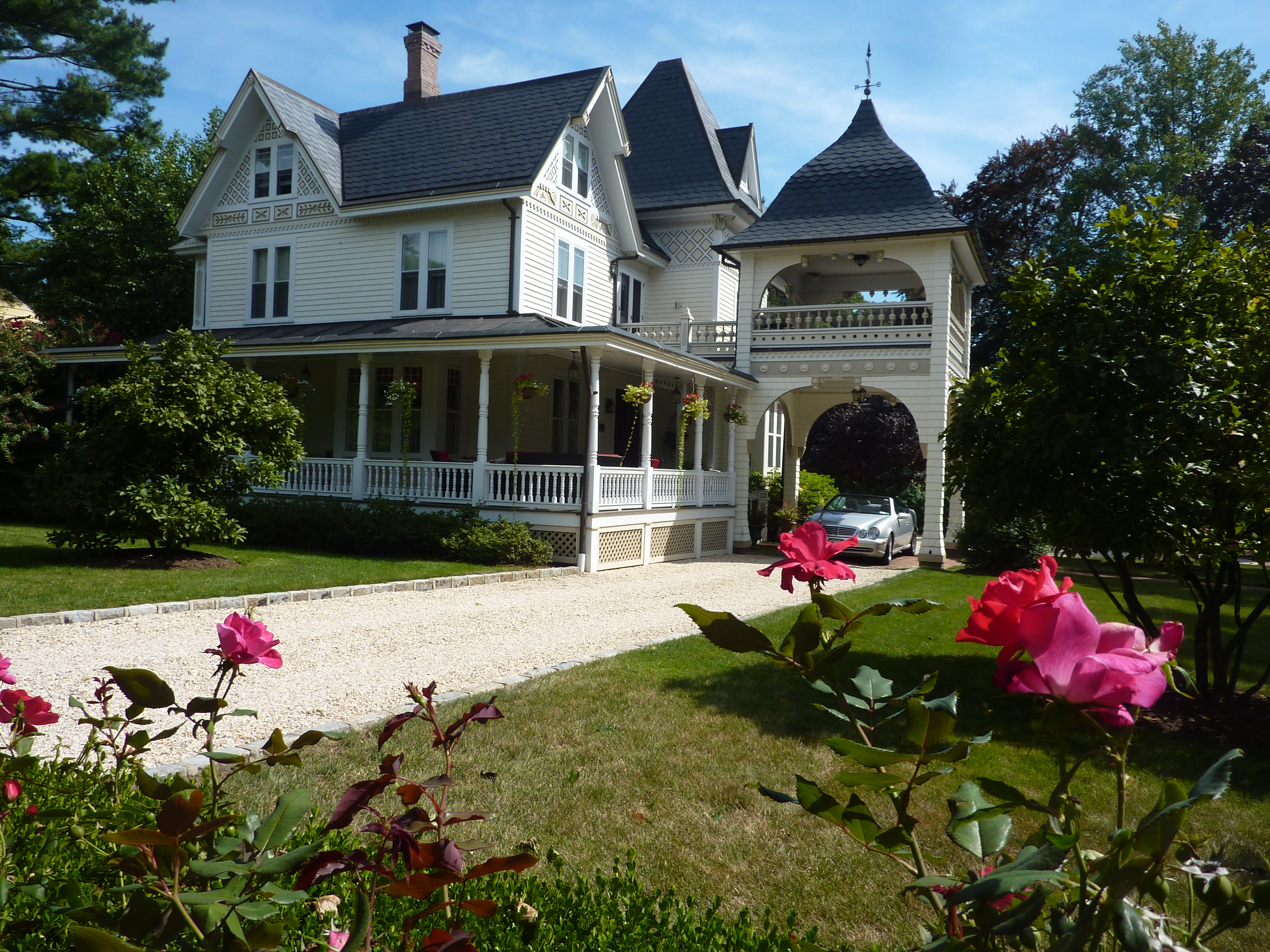

- Location within New York Location within the United States
- Location: 207 Carpenter Ave., Sea Cliff, New York
- Coordinates: 40°50′56″N 73°38′29″W
- Area: less than one acre
- Built: 1885
- Architectural style: Queen Anne
- MPS: Sea Cliff Summer Resort TR
- NRHP reference No.: 88000007
- Added to NRHP: February 18, 1988

House at 207 Carpenter Avenue is a historic home located at Sea Cliff in Nassau County, New York. It was built about 1885 and is a 2 1/2-story clapboard-sided house with a multi-gabled slate roof in the Queen Anne style. It features an attached tower with tent roof and a porte cochere with bell shaped roof. The porte cochere has a second floor sleeping porch with decorative balustrade.

It was listed on the National Register of Historic Places in 1988. It was included in a study covering the Sea Cliff Summer Resort area as a "Thematic Group".
