= House at 18 Seventeenth Avenue =

Historic house in New York, United States

- U.S. National Register of Historic Places
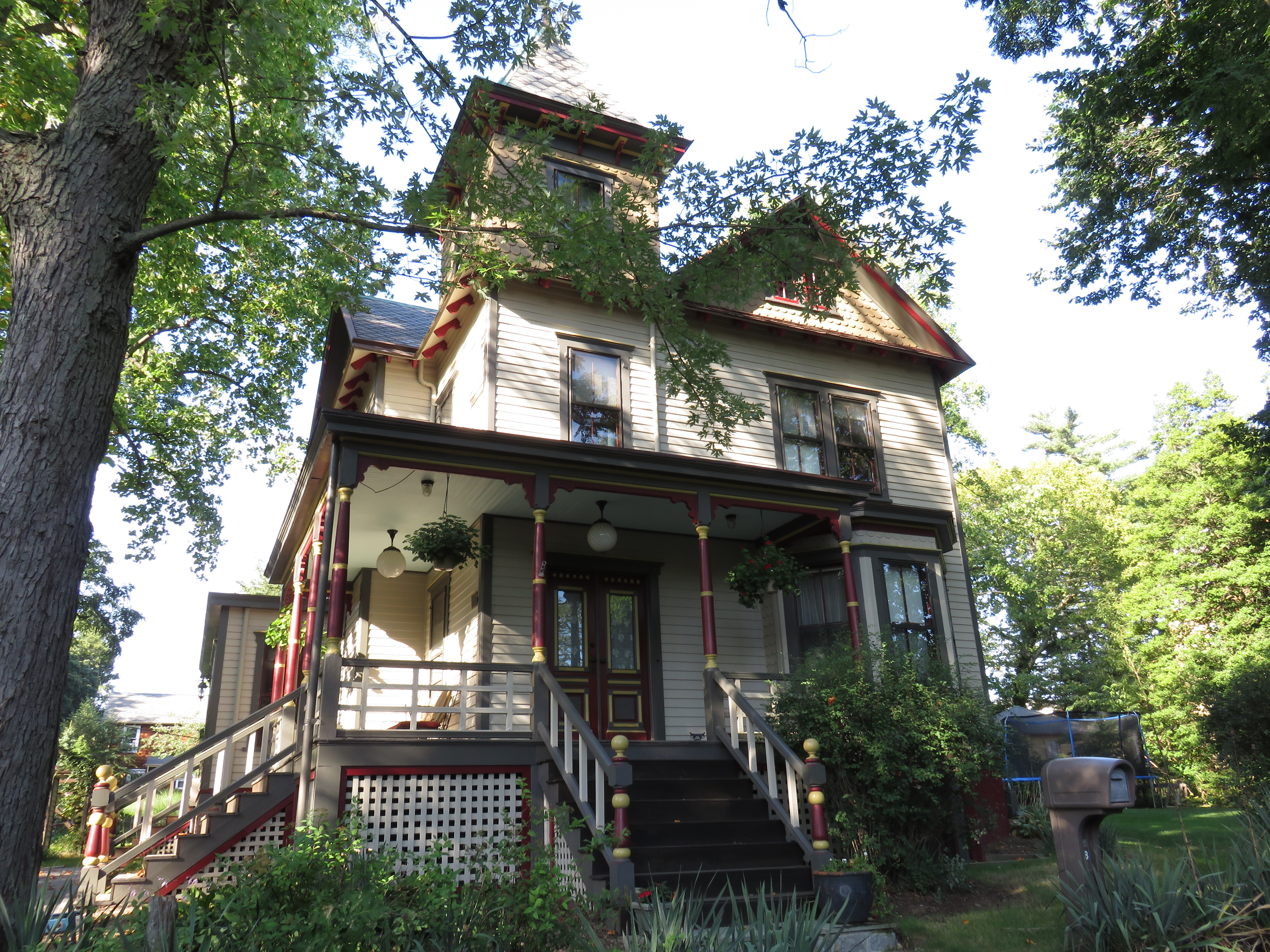

- Location within New York Location within the United States
- Location: 18 Seventeenth Ave., Sea Cliff, New York
- Coordinates: 40°50′48.951″N 73°38′49.0596″W
- Area: less than one acre
- Built: c. 1890
- Architect: Combs & Pearsall
- Architectural style: Queen Anne
- MPS: Sea Cliff Summer Resort TR
- NRHP reference No.: 88000011
- Added to NRHP: February 18, 1988

18 Seventeenth Avenue is a historic house located at the address of the same name in Sea Cliff, Nassau County, New York.

== Description and history ==
It was built in about 1890 by Combs & Pearsall, and is a two-story, clapboard sided, Queen Anne style residence with a cross-gabled roof. It features a three-story square tower with a pyramidal roof with overhanging eaves supported by decorative scroll sawn brackets.

It was listed on the National Register of Historic Places on February 18, 1988. It was included in a study covering the Sea Cliff Summer Resort area as a "Thematic Group".
