= House at 58 Eighteenth Avenue =

Historic house in New York, United States

- U.S. National Register of Historic Places
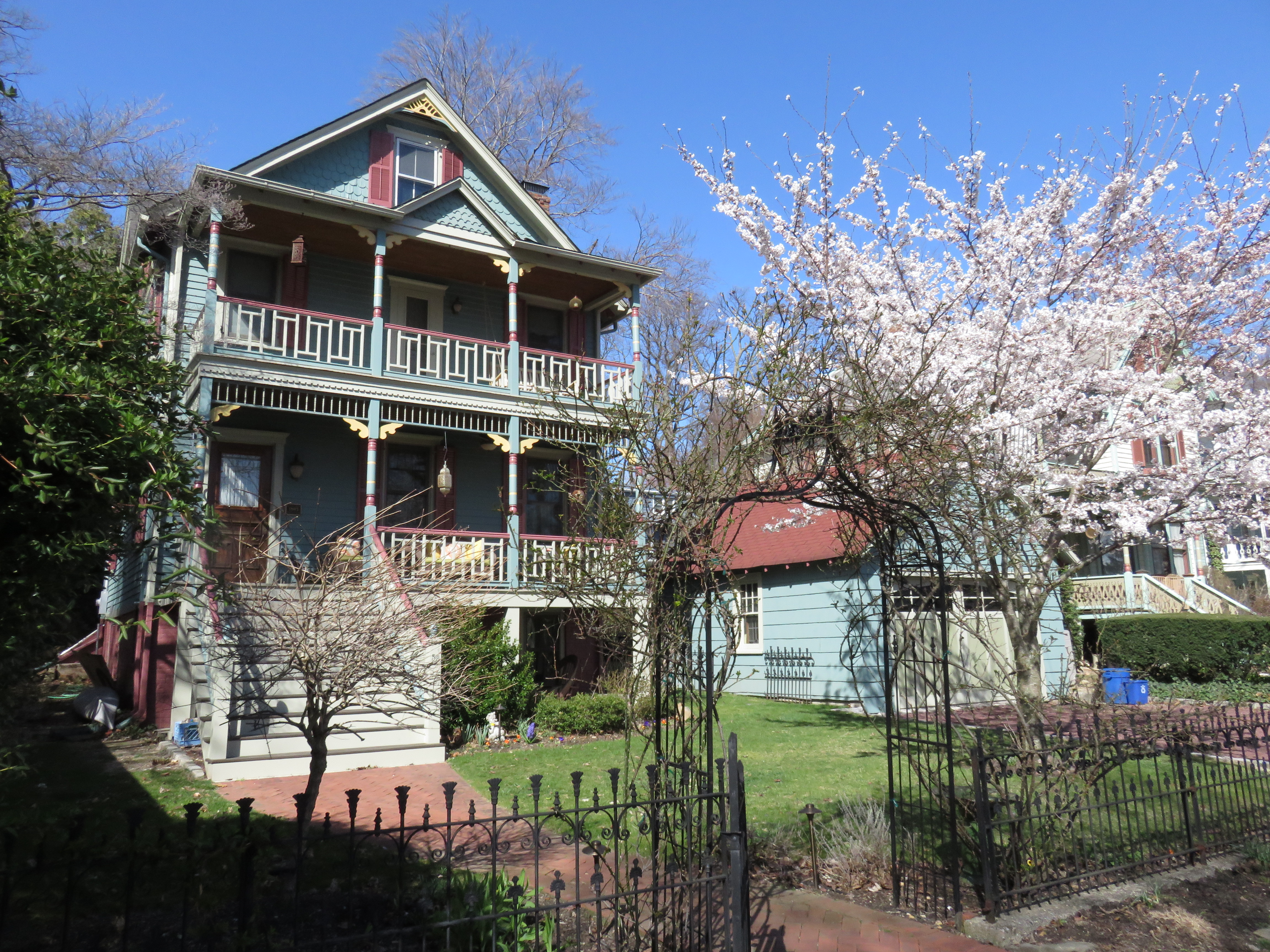

- Location within New York Location within the United States
- Location: 58 Eighteenth Ave., Sea Cliff, New York
- Coordinates: 40°50′48″N 73°39′1″W
- Area: less than one acre
- Built: 1893
- Architectural style: Late Victorian
- MPS: Sea Cliff Summer Resort TR
- NRHP reference No.: 88000002
- Added to NRHP: February 18, 1988

House at 58 Eighteenth Avenue is a historic home located at Sea Cliff in Nassau County, New York. It was built in 1893 and is a two-story, three bay clapboard sided residence with a cross gable roof in the Late Victorian style. It features a first floor porch with spindle balustrade and fishscale shingling. Also on the property is a contributing cast iron fence.

It was listed on the National Register of Historic Places in 1988. It was included in a study covering the Sea Cliff Summer Resort area as a "Thematic Group".
