= House at 362 Sea Cliff Avenue =

Historic house in New York, United States

- U.S. National Register of Historic Places
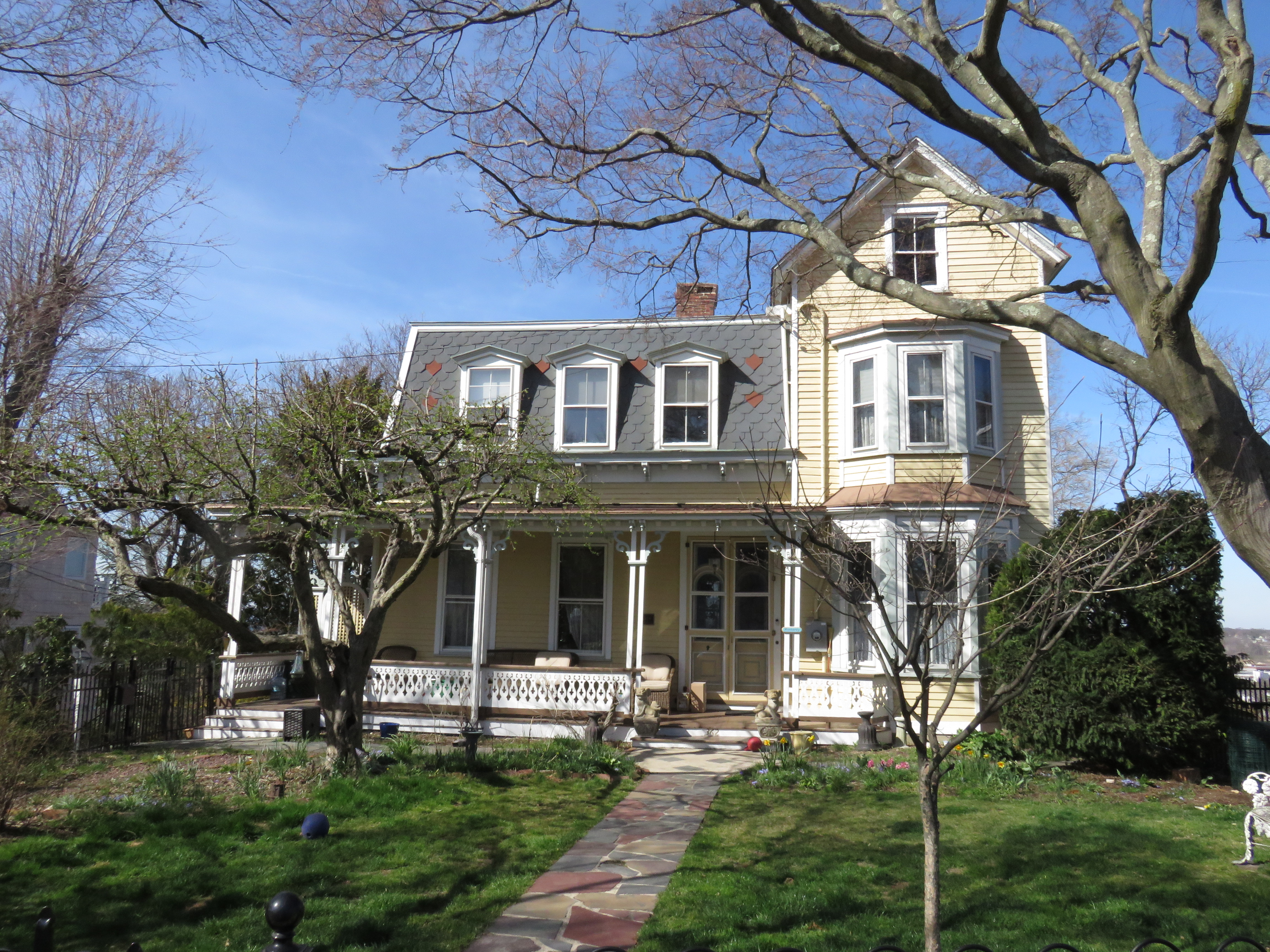

- Location within New York Location within the United States
- Location: 362 Sea Cliff Ave., Sea Cliff, New York
- Coordinates: 40°50′58″N 73°39′1″W
- Area: less than one acre
- Built: 1875
- Architect: McCormack, Joseph E.
- Architectural style: Second Empire
- MPS: Sea Cliff Summer Resort TR
- NRHP reference No.: 88000037
- Added to NRHP: February 18, 1988

House at 362 Sea Cliff Avenue is a historic home located at Sea Cliff in Nassau County, New York. It was built about 1875 and expanded in 1890. It consists of a three-bay, 2-story main section with a mansard roof and 1 1/2-story gable-roofed wing in the Second Empire style. It features a shed-roofed porch with scrollsawn corner brackets.

It was listed on the National Register of Historic Places in 1988. It was included in a study covering the Sea Cliff Summer Resort area as a "Thematic Group".
