= House at 52 Frost Mill Road =

Historic house in New York, United States

- U.S. National Register of Historic Places
- Location within New York Location within the United States
- Location: 52 Frost Mill Road, Mill Neck, New York
- Coordinates: 40°53′13″N 73°33′39″W
- Area: 4.27 acres (1.73 ha)
- Built: c. 1890, 1927, 1944
- Architectural style: Colonial Revival
- NRHP reference No.: 11000598
- Added to NRHP: August 24, 2011

Turbillion, also known as the Wright-Underhill House, is a historic home located at Mill Neck in Nassau County, New York. The house is believed to date to the 18th century settlement period, then substantially expanded and restyled in the Colonial Revival style in the late-19th and early-20th centuries. It is a two-story, five-bay, frame dwelling with a side-gable roof with three dormers. It has two two-story additions. Farm outbuildings include a wood-framed shed, horse barn, and chicken coop.

It was listed on the National Register of Historic Places in 2011.
