= House at 19 Locust Place =

Historic house in New York, United States

- U.S. National Register of Historic Places
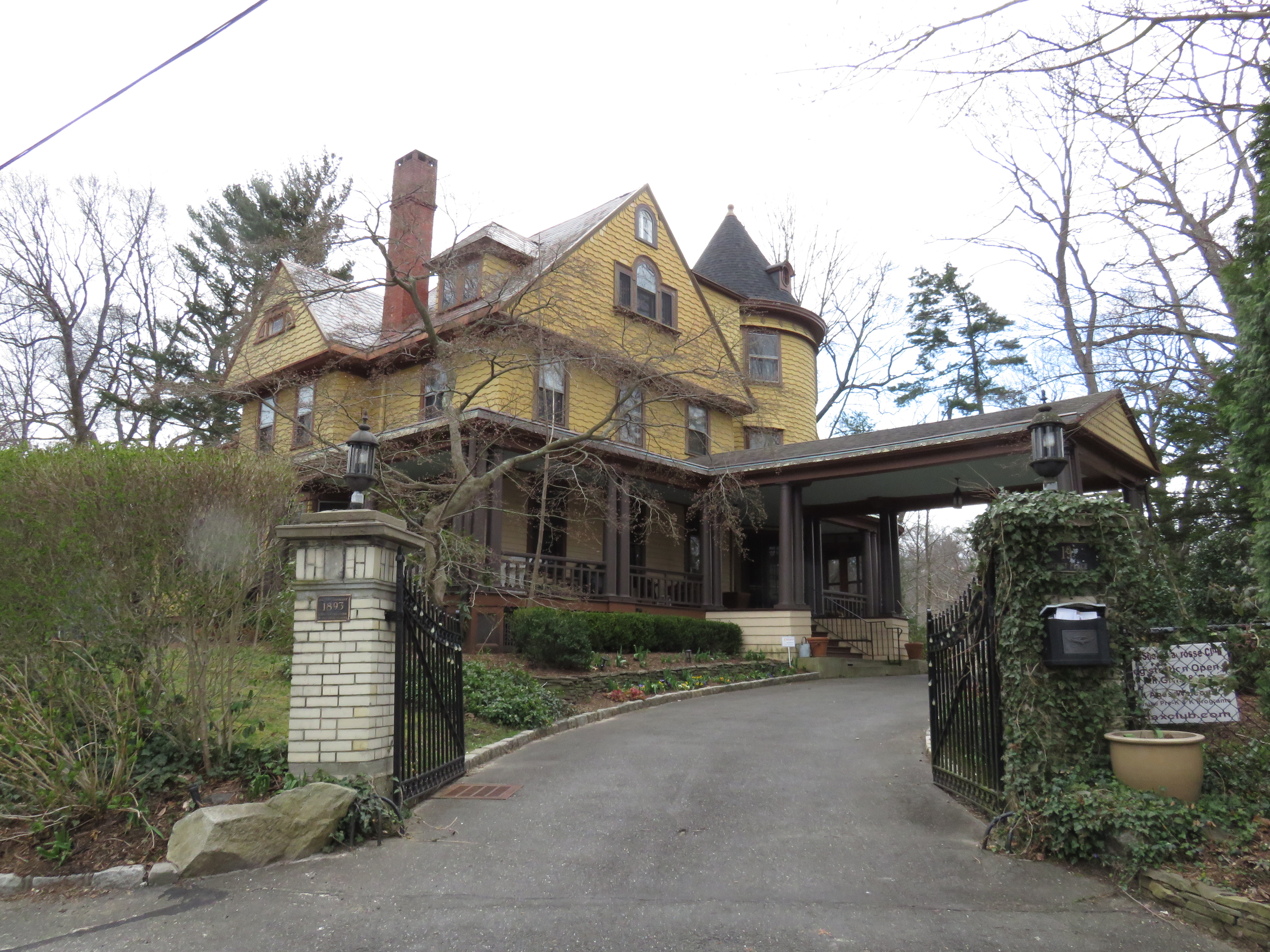

- Location within New York Location within the United States
- Location: 19 Locust Pl., Sea Cliff, New York
- Coordinates: 40°50′38″N 73°39′4″W
- Area: less than one acre
- Built: 1893
- Architectural style: Shingle Style
- MPS: Sea Cliff Summer Resort TR
- NRHP reference No.: 88000010
- Added to NRHP: February 18, 1988

House at 19 Locust Place is a historic home located at Sea Cliff in Nassau County, New York. It was built in 1893 and is a large, rambling 2 1/2-story house with slate-covered cross-gable roof and a large round tower in the Shingle Style. It features a broad shed-roofed wraparound porch supported by Doric order columns and a variety of window types.

It was listed on the National Register of Historic Places in 1988. It was included in a study covering the Sea Cliff Summer Resort area as a "Thematic Group".
