= Sea Cliff, New York =

- Village
- Incorporated Village of Sea Cliff
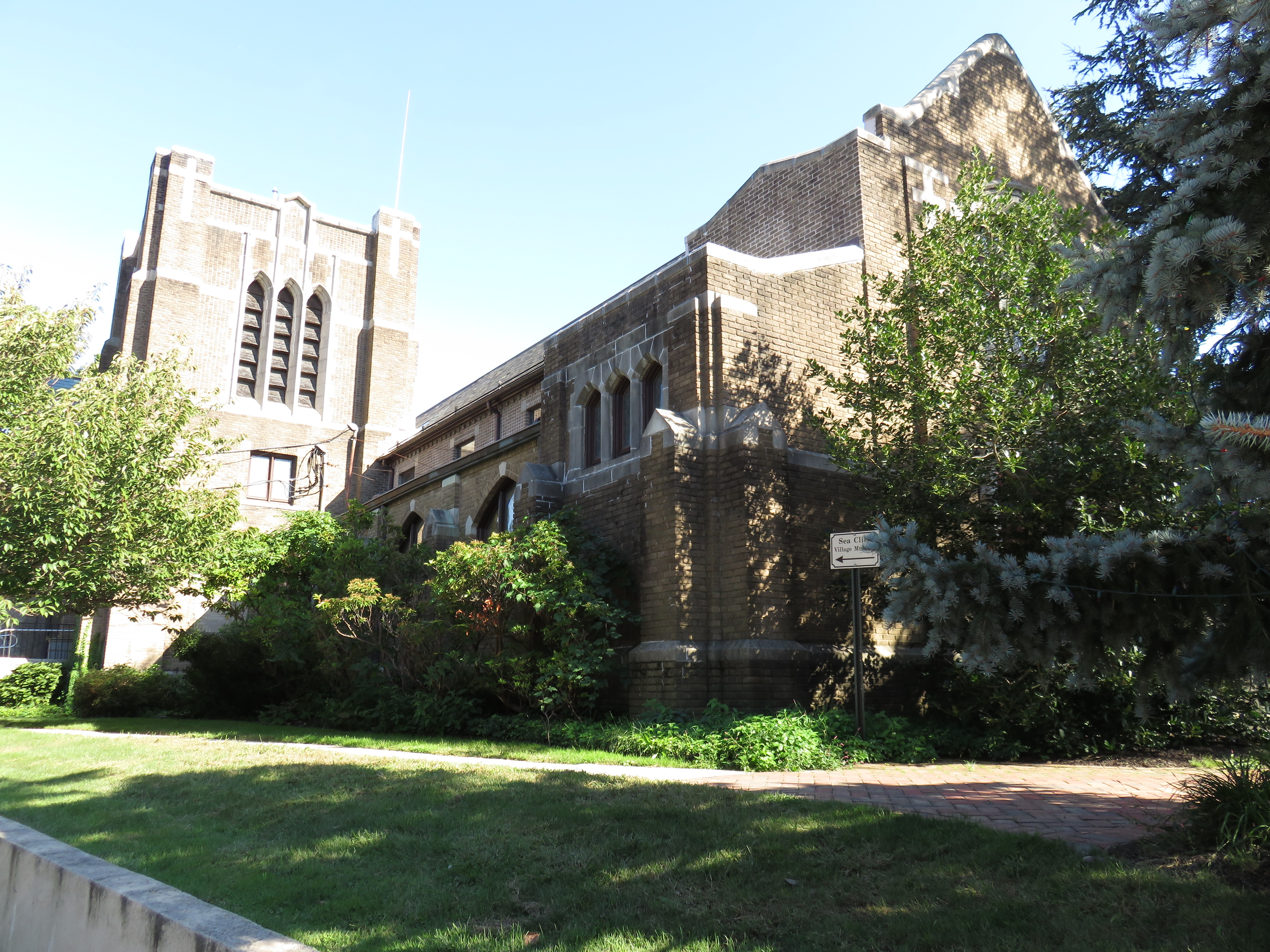
- The Sea Cliff Village Hall, Library, and Museum Complex in 2015
- Motto: One Square Mile, 16 Parks
- Location in Nassau County and the state of New York

- Location on Long Island Location within the state of New York
- Coordinates: 40°50′47″N 73°38′40″W
- Country: United States
- State: New York
- County: Nassau
- Town: Oyster Bay
- Incorporated: 1883
- Named after: Its location on a bluff overlooking Hempstead Harbor

Government
  - Mayor: Elena Villafane

Area
  - Total: 1.96 sq mi (5.08 km^{2})
  - Land: 1.12 sq mi (2.89 km^{2})
  - Water: 0.85 sq mi (2.19 km^{2})
- Elevation: 187 ft (57 m)

Population (2020)
  - Total: 5,062
  - Density: 4,540.6/sq mi (1,753.13/km^{2})
- Time zone: UTC-5 (Eastern (EST))
  - Summer (DST): UTC-4 (EDT)
- ZIP code: 11579
- Area codes: 516, 363
- FIPS code: 36-66047
- GNIS feature ID: 0964716
- Website: www.seacliff-ny.gov

Sea Cliff is a village located within the Town of Oyster Bay in Nassau County, on Long Island, in New York, United States. It is considered part of the greater Glen Cove area, which is anchored by the City of Glen Cove. The population was 5,062 at the time of the 2020 census.

== History ==
Sea Cliff incorporated as a village in 1883, with the growing community seeking to gain home rule powers and better control local affairs.

The community's public library initially opened in 1894. It formally became a village-administered agency in 1927, through a transfer of charter.

In 1968, the village moved its government offices and administrative facilities to its current location in the former Sea Cliff Methodist Church building and parsonage, which had been donated to the village by the church. The library followed suit in 1970, when it, too, moved into the building. The Sea Cliff Museum opened within the building later in the decade, following the United States Bicentennial.

In March 2025, Robert Ehrlich, the founder of Pirate's Booty, falsely claimed to be the mayor of Sea Cliff during a "tense standoff at Village Hall", making reference to the Citizen Empowerment Act. Village officials refuted Ehrlich's claim. Ehrlich ran for mayor as a write-in candidate, but lost to incumbent Elena Villafane by a vote of 1,064-62.

== Geography ==
According to the United States Census Bureau, the village has a total area of 2.0 square miles (5.2 km^{2}), of which 1.1 square miles (2.8 km^{2}) is land and 0.9 square miles (2.3 km^{2}), or 44.67%, is water.

=== Climate ===
According to the Köppen climate classification, Sea Cliff has a Humid subtropical climate (type Cfa) with cool, wet winters and hot, humid summers. Precipitation is uniform throughout the year, with slight spring and fall peaks.

== Demographics ==
Historical population
Census	Pop.	Note	%±
1880	554		—
1900	1,558		—
1910	1,694		8.7%
1920	2,108		24.4%
1930	3,456		63.9%
1940	4,416		27.8%
1950	4,868		10.2%
1960	5,669		16.5%
1970	5,890		3.9%
1980	5,364		−8.9%
1990	5,054		−5.8%
2000	5,066		0.2%
2010	4,995		−1.4%
2020	5,062		1.3%
U.S. Decennial Census

=== 2010 census ===
As of the 2010 census the population was 92.8% White, 88% Non-Hispanic white, 2.4% African American, 0.1% Native American, 1.9% Asian, 0.02% Pacific Islander, 0.95% from other races, and 1.4% from two or more races. Hispanic or Latino of any race were 6.8% of the population.

=== 2000 census ===
At the 2000 census there were 5,066 people, 2,013 households, and 1,356 families in the village. The population density was 4,655.1 inhabitants per square mile (1,797.3/km^{2}). There were 2,082 housing units at an average density of 1,913.1 per square mile (738.7/km^{2}). The racial makeup of the village was 94.83% White, 1.68% African American, 0.10% Native American, 1.22% Asian, 0.02% Pacific Islander, 0.95% from other races, and 1.20% from two or more races. Hispanic or Latino of any race were 4.76%.

Of the 2,013 households 31.0% had children under the age of 18 living with them, 56.1% were married couples living together, 8.4% had a female householder with no husband present, and 32.6% were non-families. 26.6% of households were one person and 9.4% were one person aged 65 or older. The average household size was 2.50 and the average family size was 3.06.

The age distribution was 24.1% under the age of 18, 4.6% from 18 to 24, 27.9% from 25 to 44, 27.8% from 45 to 64, and 15.5% 65 or older. The median age was 42 years. For every 100 females, there were 94.7 males. For every 100 females age 18 and over, there were 91.0 males.

The median household income was $78,501 and the median family income was $100,576. Males had a median income of $65,469 versus $41,146 for females. The per capita income for the village was $41,707. About 2.1% of families and 2.8% of the population were below the poverty line, including 0.7% of those under age 18 and 10.6% of those age 65 or over.

== Government ==
=== Village government ===
The Village of Sea Cliff is governed by the Village of Sea Cliff Board of Trustees. This governing body consists of an elected Mayor and four elected Village Trustees.

As of March 2026, the Mayor of Sea Cliff is Elena Villafane, and the Village Trustees are Nick Pinto, Mark Sobel, James Versocki, and George Williams.

=== Representation in higher government ===
==== County representation ====
Sea Cliff is located in Nassau County's 11th Legislative district, which as of March 2026 is represented in the Nassau County Legislature by Delia DeRiggi-Whitton (D–Glen Cove).

==== New York State representation ====
===== New York State Assembly =====
Sea Cliff is located in the New York State Assembly's 13th State Assembly district, which as of March 2026 is represented by Charles D. Lavine (D–Glen Cove).

===== New York State Senate =====
Sea Cliff is located in the New York State Senate's 7th State Senate district, which as of March 2026 is represented by Jack M. Martins (R–Old Westbury).

==== Federal representation ====
===== United States Congress =====
Sea Cliff is located in New York's 3rd congressional district, which as of March 2026 is represented in the United States Congress by Thomas R. Suozzi (D–Glen Cove).

===== United States Senate =====
Like the rest of New York, Sea Cliff is represented in the United States Senate by Charles E. Schumer (D) and Kirsten E. Gillibrand (D).

=== Politics ===
In the 2024 U.S. presidential election, the majority of Sea Cliff voters voted for Kamala D. Harris (D).

== Education ==
=== Schools ===
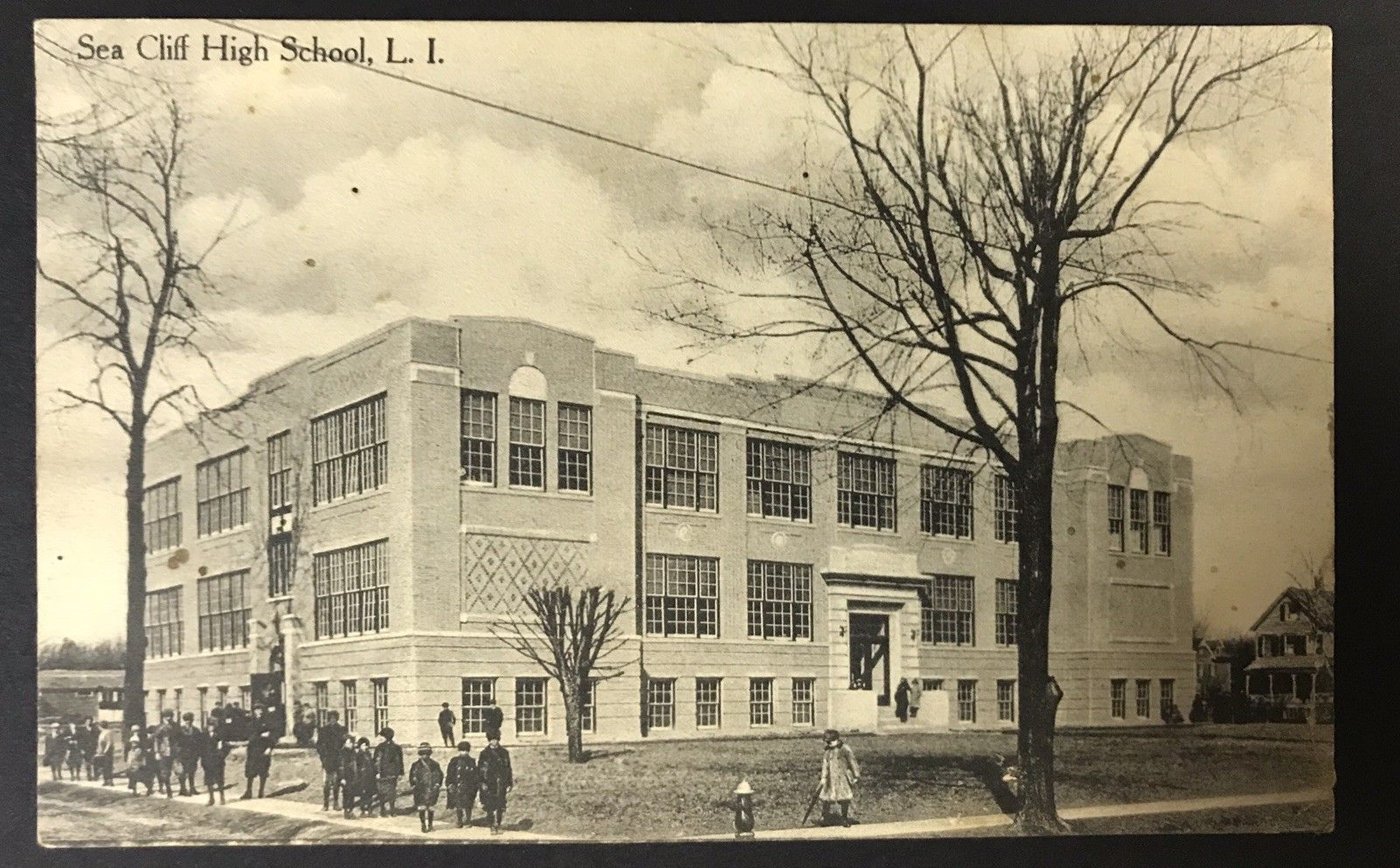
The Sea Cliff School in 1914

The village is part of the North Shore Central School District.

The North Shore CSD's Sea Cliff School, furthermore, is located within the village. It previously served as the community's sole school, prior to the Sea Cliff School District's merger into the North Shore Central School District in 1953; the school was then repurposed as one of the district's elementary schools.

=== Library ===
The Village of Sea Cliff operates its own municipal library. Known as the Sea Cliff Village Library, its service area boundaries are coterminous with those of the village. It is one of the 54 member libraries comprising the Nassau Library System.

== Landmarks ==
Several buildings in Sea Cliff, mostly Victorian houses, are listed on the National Register of Historic Places. Many of them were built as summer homes as part of Sea Cliff's late nineteenth century role as a resort town, and they have been collectively called "one of the best collections of late Victorian era architecture in Nassau County."

Properties in Sea Cliff listed on the National Register of Historic Places include:

- Central Hall
- Christ Building
- Crowell House
- House at 9 Locust Place
- House at 18 Seventeenth Avenue
- House at 19 Locust Place
- House at 58 Eighteenth Avenue
- House at 65 Twentieth Avenue
- House at 103 Roslyn Avenue
- House at 112 Sea Cliff Avenue
- House at 115 Central Avenue
- House at 137 Prospect Avenue
- House at 173 Sixteenth Avenue
- House at 176 Prospect Avenue
- House at 195 Prospect Avenue
- House at 199 Prospect Avenue
- House at 207 Carpenter Avenue
- House at 240 Sea Cliff Avenue
- House at 285 Sea Cliff Avenue
- House at 332 Franklin Avenue
- House at 362 Sea Cliff Avenue
- House at 378 Glen Avenue
- Sea Cliff Firehouse
- Sea Cliff Village Hall, Library, and Museum Complex
- St. Luke's Protestant Episcopal Church
- Stephen Harding House

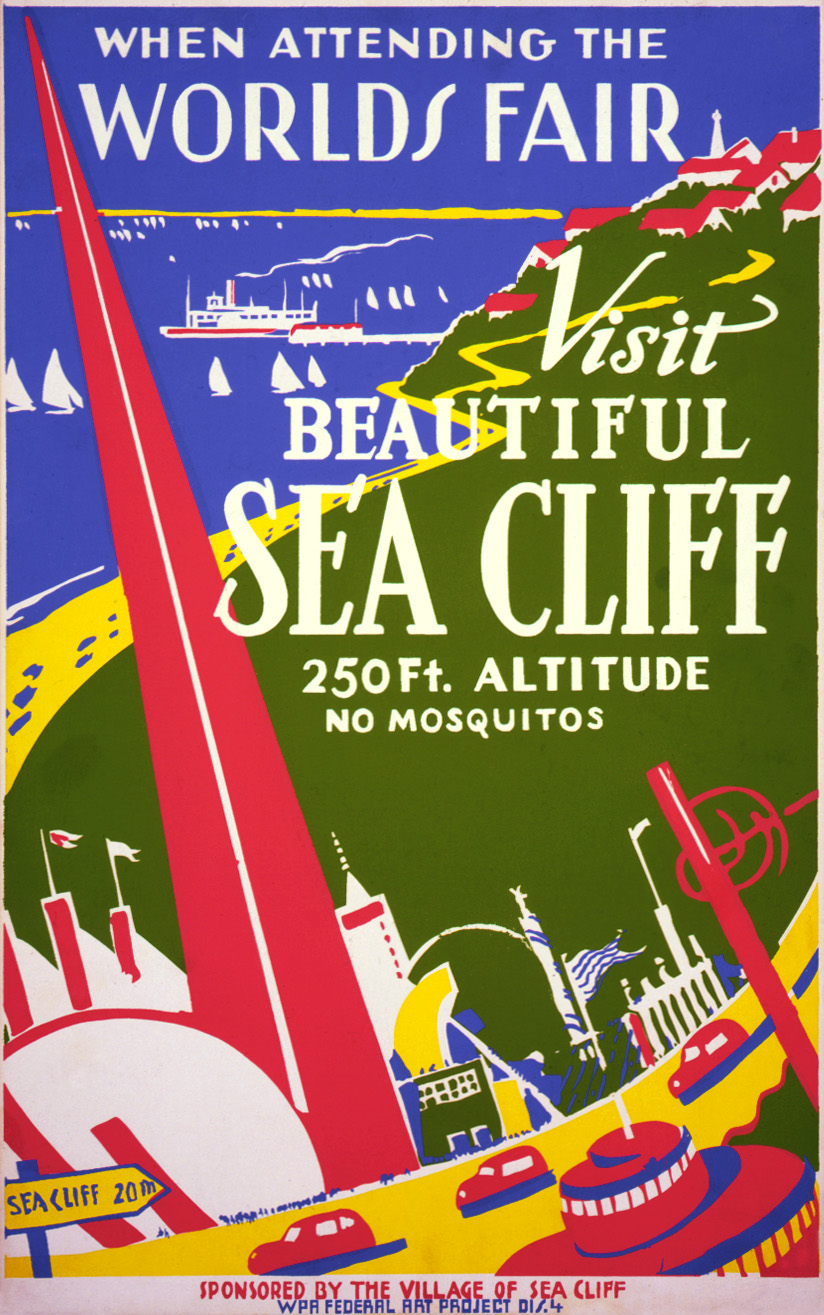
WPA Poster advertising Sea Cliff (c. 1939)

== Notable people ==
- Mac Ayres – Singer, songwriter
- Rose Elizabeth Bird – First female Chief Justice of California
- Robert Olen Butler – Writer
- Nini Camps – Lead singer of rock band Antigone Rising
- Robert Ehrlich – Businessman
- Dan Fagin – Writer
- Kristen Henderson – Drummer of rock band Antigone Rising
- Alfred Lansing – Author of Endurance: Shackleton's Incredible Voyage
- Arnold Levin – Cartoonist
- Michael McKean – Actor, comedian, screenwriter, and musician
- Kate McKinnon – Actress and comedian
- Natalie Portman – Actress
- John Rzeznik – Frontman of the rock band Goo Goo Dolls
- Amanda Sobhy – Professional squash player
- LaMarcus Adna Thompson – Inventor and businessman
- Linda Yaccarino - X Corp. and Twitter CEO

== See also ==
- List of municipalities in New York
- Sea Cliff station
