= Christ Church (Oyster Bay, New York) =

Historic church in New York, United States

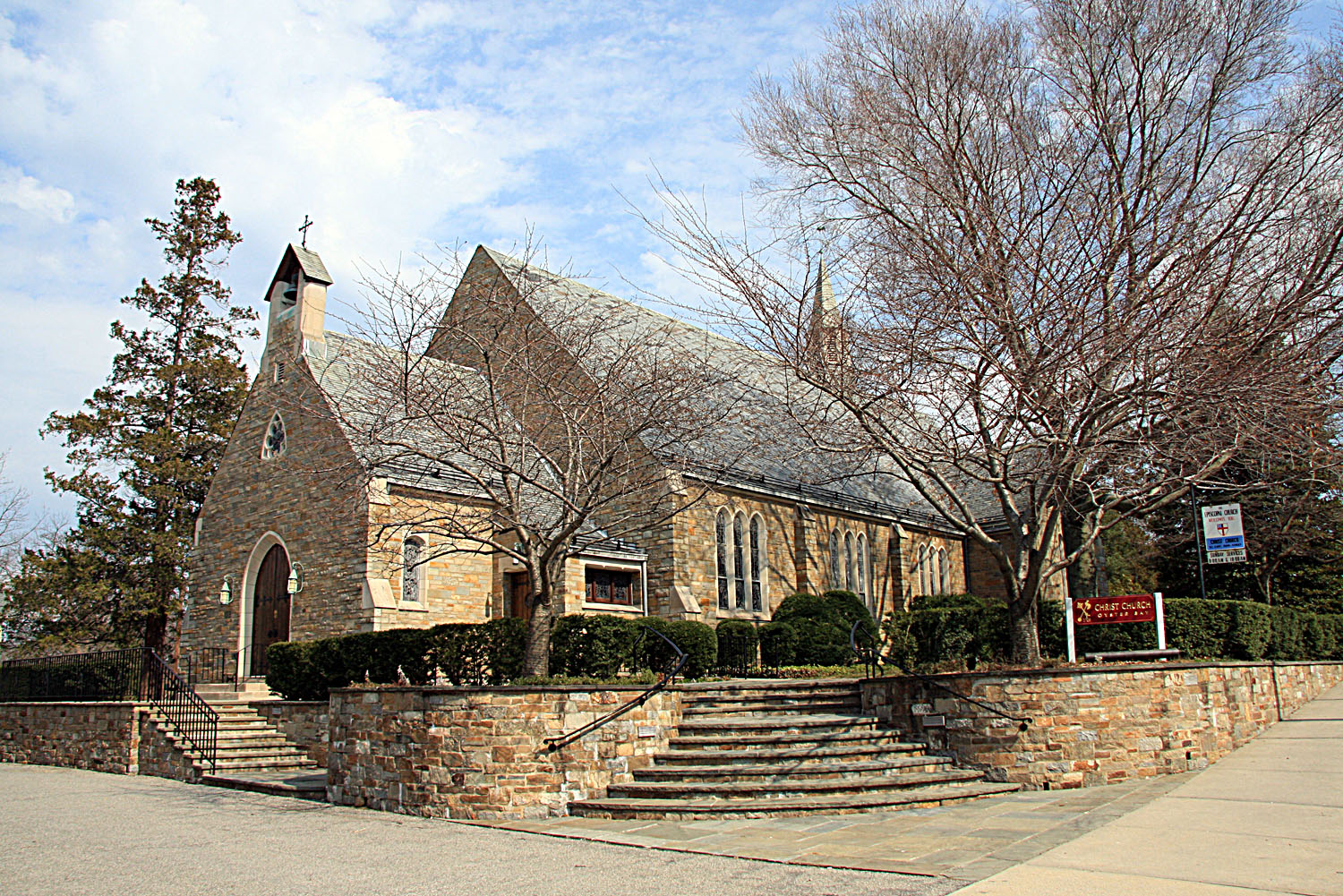
- Front elevation, 2008

Religion
- Affiliation: ECUSA
- Leadership: The Rev. Dr. Michael Piret, Rector

Location
- Location: 61 East Main Street; Oyster Bay, New York 11771, United States
- State: New York
- Interactive map of Christ Church
- Coordinates: 40°52′20.35″N 73°31′39.87″W

Architecture
- Type: Church
- Style: Carpenter Gothic

Specifications
- Direction of façade: West
- Materials: Stone, slate

U.S. National Register of Historic Places
- Added to NRHP: 2018
- NRHP Reference no.: SG100003115

Christ Church, founded in 1705, is a historic Episcopal parish located at 61 East Main Street in Oyster Bay, New York. Several church buildings have occupied this site, including one that served as soldiers' barracks during the Revolutionary War.

In the 1870s a Carpenter Gothic style building was erected. In 1925 it was greatly enlarged and encased in stone. Those additions also included striking stained glass windows. President Theodore Roosevelt attended church here, and his wife and children were active members. Roosevelt's funeral service was held here in 1919. Today Christ Church is a featured site on the Oyster Bay History Walk audio walking tour.

In 2018 it was listed on the National Register of Historic Places.

== Church buildings on this site ==
1. Built 1707 (ca). Served as town hall and church
2. Built 1750, occupied by British and Hessian forces during Revolutionary War, demolished 1801
3. Built 1844
4. Built 1878, original wood structure with wood trusses still visible inside, enlarged and encased in stone in 1925, stained glass windows added

== Rectors of Christ Church ==
Rectors of Hempstead and Oyster Bay, Sent by the Society for the Propagation of the Gospel in Foreign Parts

1. John Thomas, rector, 1704–1724, inducted at Hempstead on December 26, 1704 (assumed duties in Oyster Bay in 1705)
2. Robert Jenney, rector, 1726–1742, graduated from the University of Dublin, former chaplain in the Royal Navy
3. Samuel Seabury (1706–1764), rector, 1742–1764, originally a Congregationalist minister, later a deacon and priest in the Church of England (father of the first Episcopal bishop in America)
4. Leonard Cutting, rector, 1766–1784, went to Eton, taught Greek and Latin at King's College, now Columbia University, before entering the priesthood. Forced to leave by patriots because of Tory sympathies.

Rectors During the Transition Period

5. Andrew Fowler, 1790
6. John Churchill Rudd, 1805
7. Edward K. Fowler, 1822–1826
8. Samuel Seabury, 1826–1827
9. Joseph F. Phillips, 1832–1835

Rectors Since the Reorganization of 1835

10. Isaac Sherwood, 1835–1844
11. Edwin Harwood, 1844–1846
12. John Stearns, 1846–1849
13. Edmond Richards, 1849–1851
14. Joseph Ransom, 1852–1861
15. Richard Graham Hutton, 1861–1874
16. Charles W. Ward, 1874–1875
17. John Byron Murray, 1875–1876
18. George Roe Van De Water, 1876–1880
19. William Montague Geer, 1880–1888
20. Henry Homer Washburn, 1888–1911,
21. George E. Talmage, 1911–1934,
22. Harold Pattison, 1934–1940
23. John N. Warren, 1940–1967
24. Robert Titus Hollett, 1968–1987
25. Bruce D. Griffith, 1987–2002
26. Peter F. Casparian, 2004–2014

27. The Rev. Dr. Michael Piret, 2015-Present

Other Recorded Historical Figures

- Richard G. Hutton, rector, in 1844.

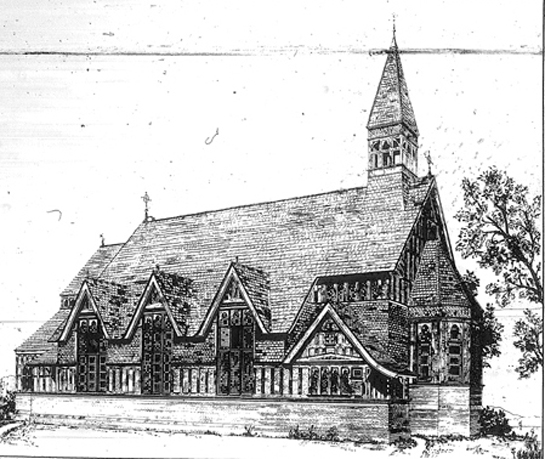
Drawings for third Christ Church building, ca. 1878

- Henry De Koven, assistant rector, 1845–1848, from Middletown, Connecticut, a relative of James DeKoven, who is listed on March 22 of the Calendar of saints (Episcopal Church in the United States of America)
- Foggo, Edward A., rector, in 1876?

== History and background ==
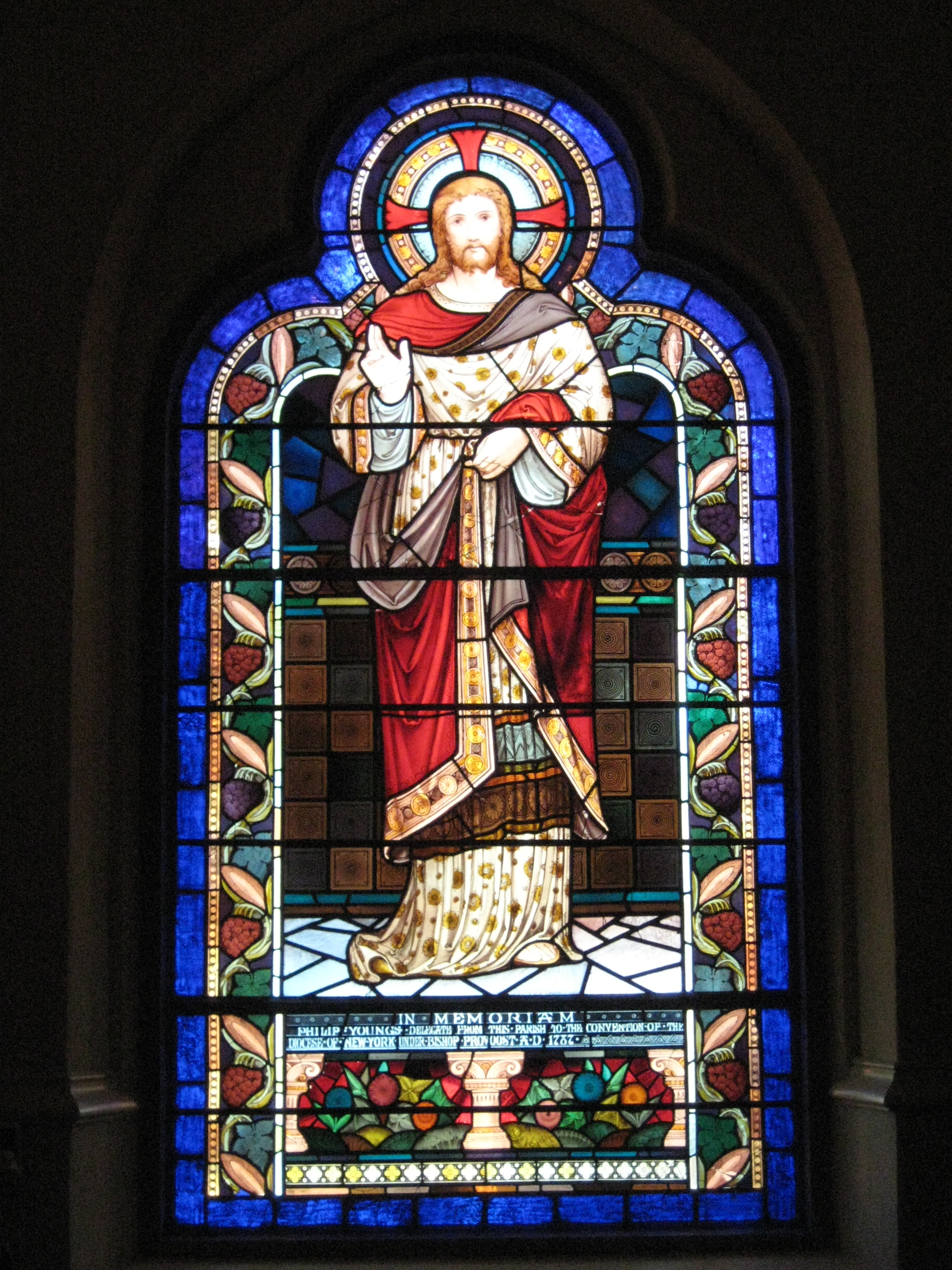
Photo of stained glass window by church entrance, 2008

Over 300 years ago the Church of England held services in Oyster Bay, led by missionaries from the Society for the Propagation of the Gospel in Foreign Parts. This congregation founded Christ Church in 1705, making it one of the oldest parishes on Long Island.

Services were first held in the "Town-House" in 1702. The town common was the present church property, and the town hall was located about where Christ Church stands today. A second town hall, authorized in 1707, was designed with seating for church purposes, and in 1750 a true church building was erected. Thus the town hall had morphed into a church, and in due time the town gave the common and the building to the congregation.

Then came the American Revolution. After many decades of growth and forward movement, the Church of England in America was stopped in her tracks. Disestablishment to the Anglican Church meant an end to any tax support. The church in Oyster Bay was damaged by Hessians who used the building as barracks, and was such a deteriorated state that it had to be demolished in 1801. The rector of Oyster Bay, Leonard Cutting, was a Tory and eventually forced to leave the area by patriots. Thereafter, Oyster Bay was only served by occasional visiting clergy until the 1830s. In short, it took about fifty years for the Anglican congregation in Oyster Bay to recover from the Revolution.

In 1802 the Oyster Bay Academy was established, in the two-story building seen at the end of the drive. Students attended class here until a public school was built in the 1840s on South Street. At that time the old Academy building became the Christ Church rectory.

The congregation had been dormant for over 40 years when they reorganized in 1843. By 1844 they had built their third church building on this site. This was removed to make way for a new building in 1878, portions of which remain visible today. These include the wood trusses in the nave and a small section of pews used by the Theodore Roosevelt family who worshiped here. Following the death of Theodore Roosevelt, a simple funeral service was held here before he was laid to rest in nearby Youngs Memorial Cemetery.

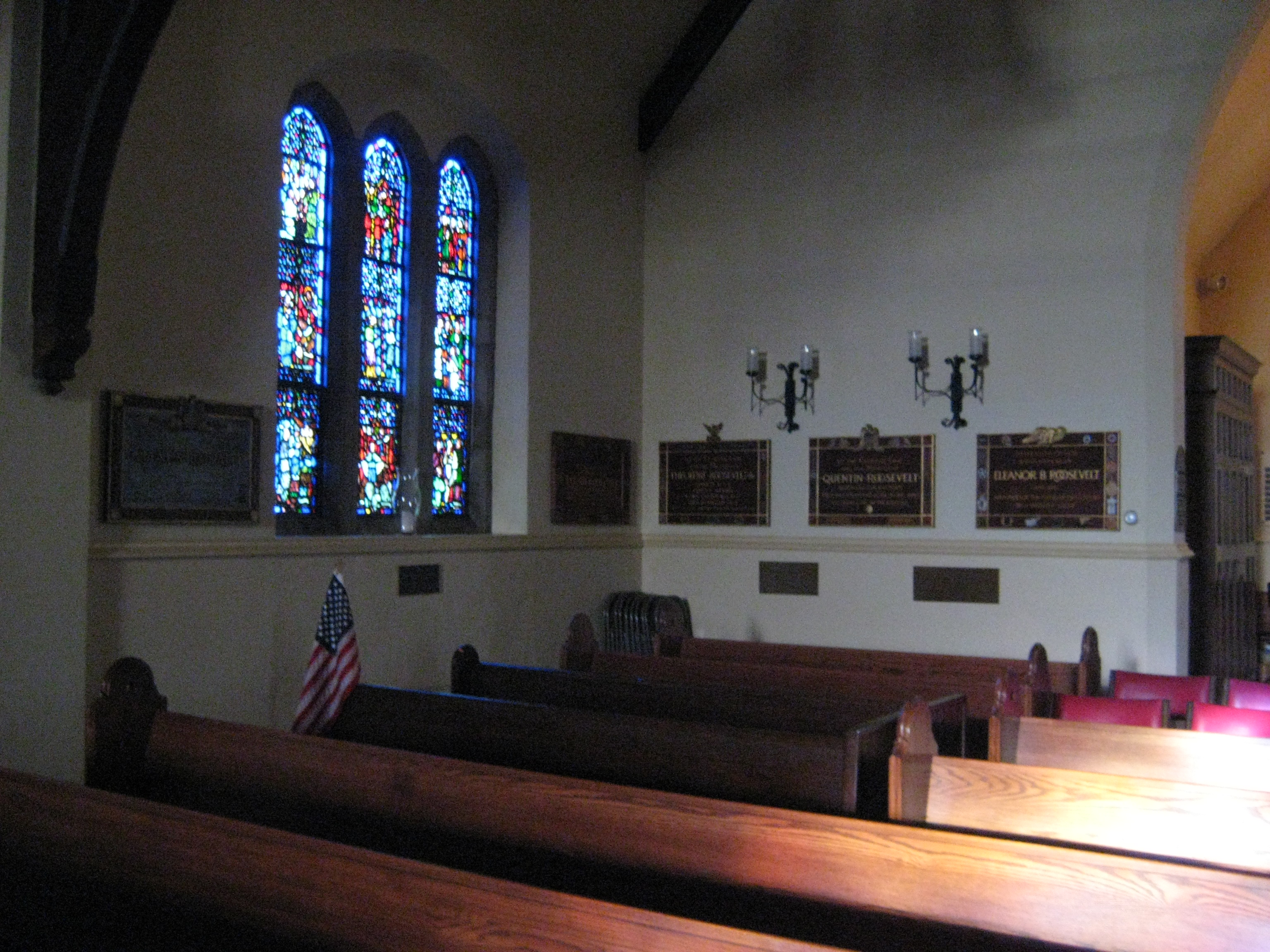
Photo of Roosevelt pew and memorial plaques for family members, 2008

A renovation in 1925 encased the wooden 1878 building in stone. Those additions also included striking stained-glass windows, modeled after the Chartres Cathedral in France. One of the finest pipe organs on Long Island was installed in 1986, a beautiful Hellmuth Wolff organ, to complement Christ Church's extensive music program.

Plaques in memory of many members of the Roosevelt family are mounted on the wall near the old pews, and all around the church are other memorials, dedicated to Christ Church members, many of whose names are familiar as place names in the community, such as Underhill, Fleet, Townsend, Beekman, Weeks and Youngs, to name only a few.

The congregation remained active over the ensuing years. A renovation of the 1802 rectory and addition of a pipe organ to the sanctuary was completed in the 1980s. In the 1990s a renovation of the church interior occurred. A campaign to renovate the Parish Hall came to a completion in 2008 when improvements were made to both the hall, and the area surrounding it.

== See also ==
- List of Town of Oyster Bay Landmarks
- National Register of Historic Places listings in Oyster Bay (town), New York
