= Swan House =

Swan House may refer to:

- Swan House (Atlanta), listed on the NRHP in Georgia
- Swan House (Chelsea Embankment), a Grade II* listed house on the River Thames in Chelsea, central London, England
- George B. Swan House, Davenport, IA, listed on the NRHP in Iowa
- Henry Swan House, Arlington, MA, listed on the NRHP in Massachusetts
- Asie Swan House, Methuen, MA, listed on the NRHP in Massachusetts
- Edward H. Swan House, Oyster Bay, NY, listed on the NRHP in New York
- Swan House and Vita Spring Pavilion, Beaver Dam, WI, listed on the NRHP in Wisconsin
