= Ken Labanowski =

American-Israeli basketball player (born 1959)

Ken Labanowski קני לבנובסקי
Personal information
- Born: May 13, 1959 (age 67)
- Listed height: 6 ft 8 in (2.03 m)

Career information
- High school: Oyster Bay (Oyster Bay, New York)
- College: Marshall (1977–1981)
- NBA draft: 1981: undrafted
- Position: Forward

Ken "Labo" Labanowski (Hebrew: קן "לאבו" לבנובסקי; born May 13, 1959) is an American-Israeli former basketball player. He played the forward position. He played for five seasons in the Israel Basketball Premier League.

== Biography ==
Labanowski was from Oyster Bay, New York. He is 6 ft 8 in (203 cm) tall. His son, Sean Labanowski, is also an Israeli-American professional basketball player; he plays for Hapoel Afula of the Israeli National League.

He played high school basketball for Oyster Bay High School ('77). In a game against Carle Place High School on January 25, 1977, Labanowski scored 50 points as he shot 25 for 29 from the floor, and that season he led Nassau County, New York, with a scoring average of 31.4. He was a 2005 inductee into the Oyster Bay High School Hall of Fame.

Labanowski attended Marshall University, and played basketball for the Marshall Thundering Herd from 1977 to 1981. He had one of the best single-game free throw performances in Southern Conference history, when in a game during the 1979–80 season he shot 13-for-13 from the line against Western Carolina University. He was named to the 1978 Southern Conference All-Freshman Team, and the 1980 Southern Conference All-Tournament First Team. He had 1,252 points, 751 rebounds, 150 assists, and 98 steals in his college career. He was inducted into the Marshall Athletic Hall of Fame in 2011.

He played for five seasons in the Israel Basketball Premier League for Hapoel Tel Aviv, Maccabi Kiryat Motzkin, and A.S. Ramat HaSharon.
