= Oyster Bay Cove, New York =

- Village
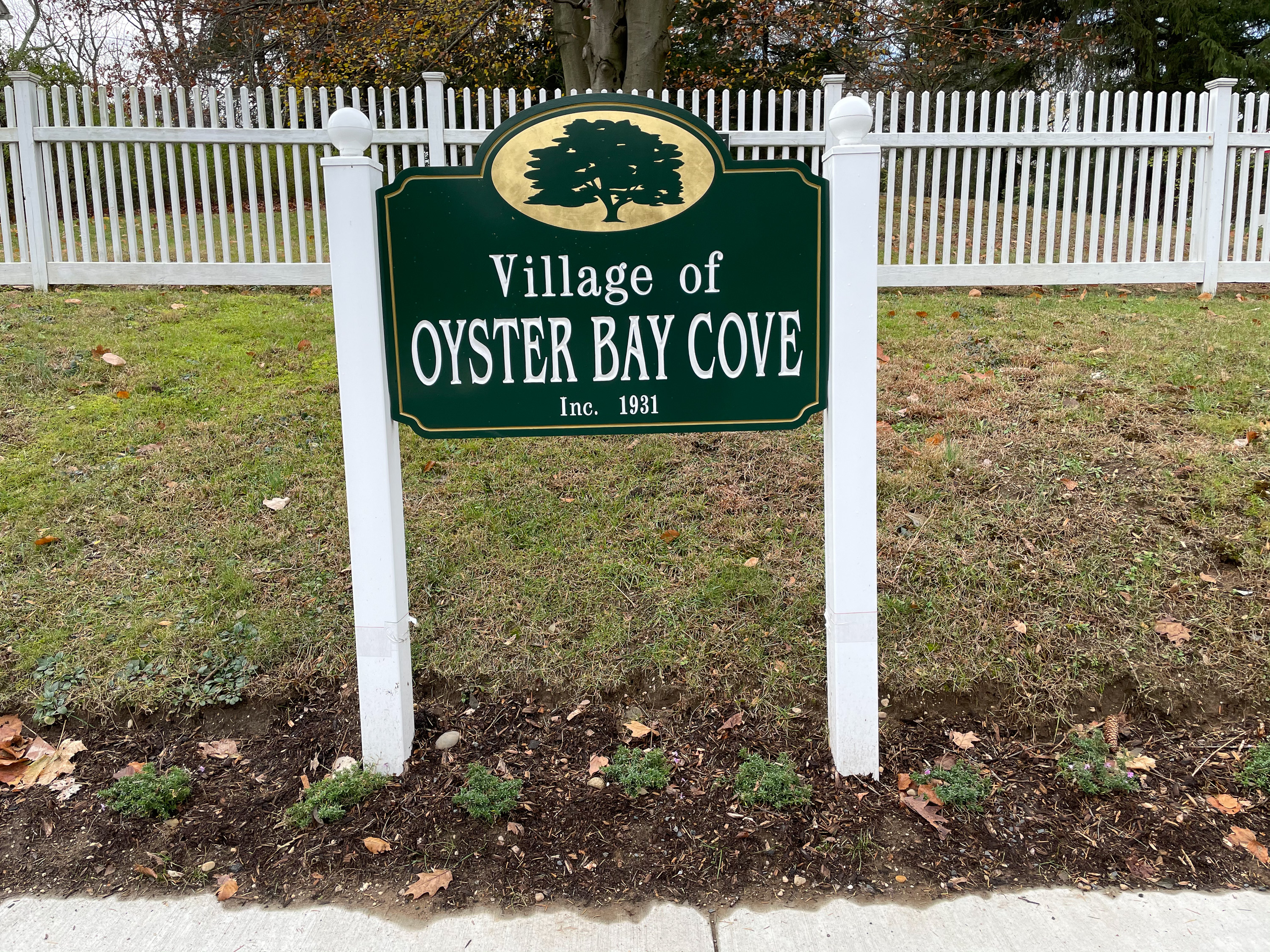
- An Oyster Bay Cove village welcome sign

- Location in Nassau County and the state of New York

- Location on Long Island Location within the state of New York
- Coordinates: 40°51′46″N 73°29′41″W
- Country: United States
- State: New York
- County: Nassau
- Town: Oyster Bay
- Incorporated: 1931

Area
  - Total: 4.25 sq mi (11.02 km^{2})
  - Land: 4.19 sq mi (10.84 km^{2})
  - Water: 0.069 sq mi (0.18 km^{2})
- Elevation: 59 ft (18 m)

Population (2020)
  - Total: 2,265
  - Density: 540/sq mi (209/km^{2})
- Time zone: UTC-5 (Eastern (EST))
  - Summer (DST): UTC-4 (EDT)
- ZIP Codes: 11771 (Oyster Bay); 11791 (Syosset)
- Area codes: 516, 363
- FIPS code: 36-56011
- GNIS feature ID: 0959719
- Website: www.oysterbaycove.net

Oyster Bay Cove is a village located within the Town of Oyster Bay in Nassau County, on the North Shore of Long Island, in New York, United States. It is considered part of the Greater Oyster Bay area, which is anchored by Oyster Bay. The population was 2,265 at the time of the 2020 census.

Youngs Memorial Cemetery, the resting place of President Theodore Roosevelt, is located in the village. The Central Administration of the Orthodox Church in America is located nearby.

== History ==
The village incorporated in 1931, and on January 14, 1932, residents unanimously voted in George T. Bowdoin as the first Mayor of Oyster Bay Cove.

The village expanded its borders through annexations in 1963.

== Geography ==
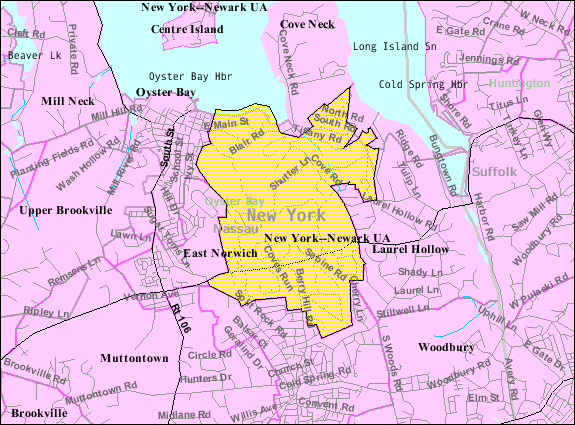
U.S. Census map of Oyster Bay Cove

According to the United States Census Bureau, the village has a total area of 4.3 square miles (11 km^{2}), of which 4.2 square miles (11 km^{2}) is land and 0.1 square miles (0.26 km^{2}) – or 1.41% – is water.

== Demographics ==
Historical population
Census	Pop.	Note	%±
1940	466		—
1950	561		20.4%
1960	988		76.1%
1970	1,320		33.6%
1980	1,799		36.3%
1990	2,109		17.2%
2000	2,262		7.3%
2010	2,197		−2.9%
2020	2,265		3.1%
U.S. Decennial Census

At the 2000 census there were 2,262 people, 725 households, and 633 families in the village. The population density was 538.1 inhabitants per square mile (207.8/km^{2}). There were 742 housing units at an average density of 176.5 per square mile (68.1/km^{2}). The racial makeup of the village was 90.23% White, 5.97% Asian, 1.77% African American, 0.09% Native American, 0.97% from other races, and 0.97% from two or more races. Hispanic or Latino of any race were 1.68%.

Of the 725 households 42.5% had children under the age of 18 living with them, 82.3% were married couples living together, 3.4% had a female householder with no male present, and 12.6% were non-families. 9.9% of households were one person and 4.3% were one person aged 65 or older. The average household size was 3.12 and the average family size was 3.31.

The age distribution was 28.4% under the age of 18, 5.5% from 18 to 24, 21.9% from 25 to 44, 32.3% from 45 to 64, and 11.9% 65 or older. The median age was 42 years. For every 100 females, there were 94.7 males. For every 100 females age 18 and over, there were 98.5 males.

The median household income was in excess $200,000, as is the median family income . Males had a median income of over $100,000 versus $53,750 for females. The per capita income for the village was $103,203. About 1.3% of families and 2.6% of the population were below the poverty line, including 0.8% of those under age 18 and 5.6% of those age 65 or over.

== Education ==
=== School districts ===
Oyster Bay Cove is primarily within the boundaries of (and is thus served by) the Oyster Bay–East Norwich Central School District. However, southern portions and some of the easternmost extremes of the village are served by the Syosset Central School District and the Cold Spring Harbor Central School District, respectively. As such, students who attend public schools and reside in Oyster Bay Cove attend school in one of these three districts depending on where they live in the village.

=== Library districts ===
Oyster Bay Cove is located within the boundaries of Cold Spring Harbor's library district, the Oyster Bay–East Norwich Library District, and the Syosset Library District. The boundaries of these districts within the village roughly correspond with those of the school districts.

== See also ==
- List of municipalities in New York
- Cove Neck, New York
- Oyster Bay (hamlet), New York
