= Yardmaster =

Railroad employee in charge of the rail yard

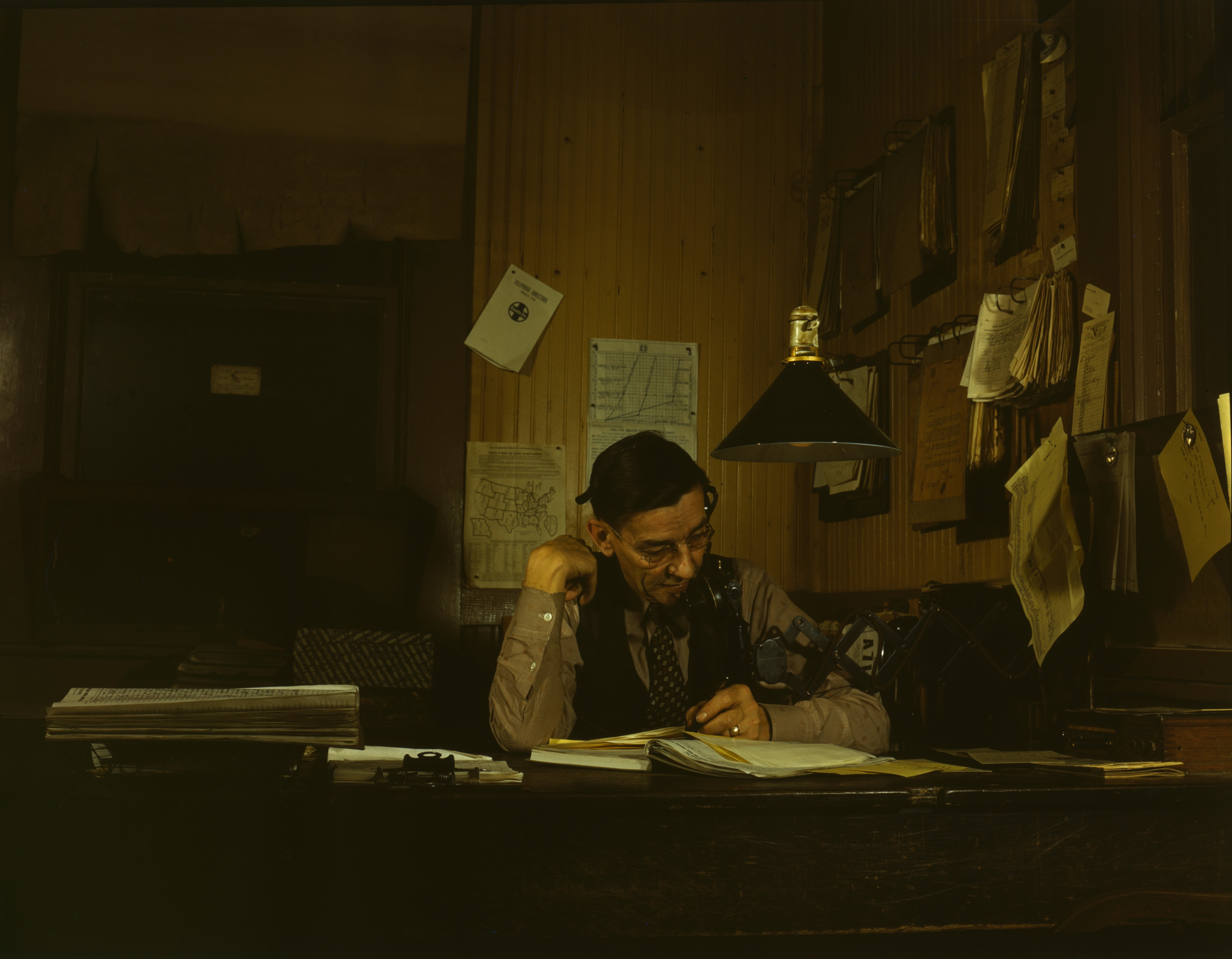
A yardmaster in Amarillo, Texas in 1943

The yardmaster is a railroad employee in charge of a rail yard. Duties involve managing and coordinating all activities in combining rolling stock into trains, breaking down trains into individual railroad cars, and switching trains from track to track in the rail yard. In the United States of America, yardmasters are eligible to join the Railroad Yardmasters of America.

For a person to work as a railroad yardmaster, they must work as a brake or signal operator, which requires the person to have a high school diploma. The training for yardmasters takes place in programs offered by the employer.

== Notable former yardmasters in the U.S. ==
- Al Alquist at the Southern Pacific Railroad
- Walter Ellsworth Bachman, Sr. (1879–1958) at the Lehigh Valley Railroad
- John Walker Barriger III (1899–1976) assistant yardmaster at the Pennsylvania Railroad
- George B. Swan, at the Chicago, Rock Island and Pacific Railroad
