= Octagon Hotel =

Coordinates: 40°52′19.56″N 73°31′59.87″W

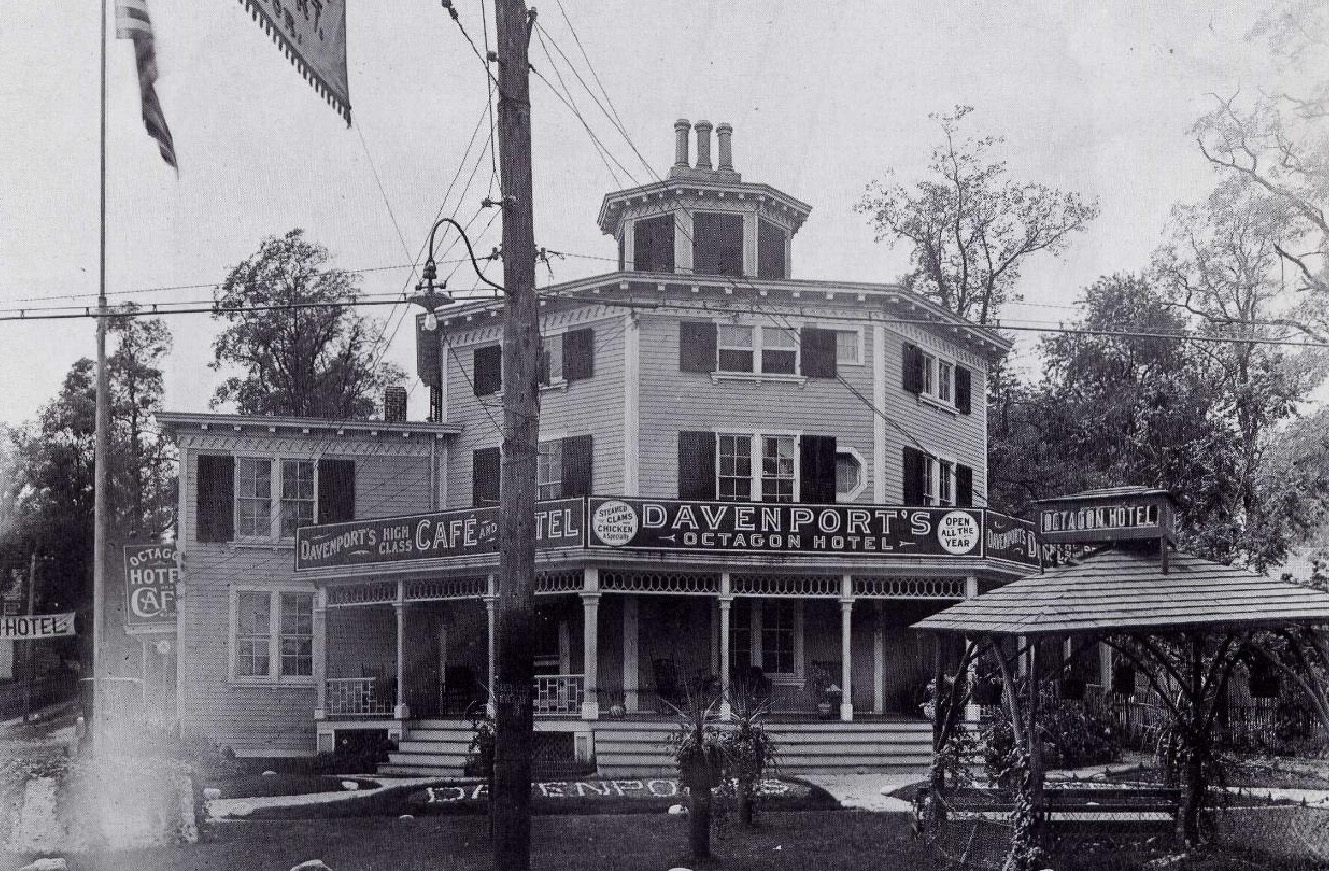
Photo of Octagon Hotel, ca.1910

The Octagon Hotel, built as the Nassau House by Luther Jackson in 1851 (175 years ago), was a pre-eminent political and social meeting space in Oyster Bay, New York. This eight-sided building is also believed to be among only a few like it on Long Island and perhaps the only octagon-shaped hotel in the United States.

== History ==
This eight-sided building was most famously known as the Octagon Hotel. It was built in 1851 for Luther Jackson and called Nassau House and later the Acker Nassau House. It was a popular restaurant and political meeting place. A less festive meeting took place here in 1884, when the hotel was the site of the coroner’s inquest into the murder of three area women, Lydia and Annie Maybee of Wolver Hollow and Oyster Bay’s own Charlotte Aurelia Townsend.

In 1887, Phillip and Mary Lavelle bought the business and renamed it the Octagon Hotel. When Phillip died Mary took over the operations and made many modern improvements which brought patrons from miles around. In 1889 she installed a central heating system which supplied year-round comfort to the guests of the hotel and in 1890 she built a generating plant which provided Oyster Bay’s first electrical lighting. Finding the new phone service offered by the Queens County Telephone and Telegraph Company unsatisfactory, she followed the example of nearby Snouder’s Drug Store and had her own direct phone line to New York City installed.

Theodore Roosevelt's secretary maintained a one-room office believed to have been on the second floor in the Octagon Hotel during 1899. Roosevelt was elected governor in late 1898 and began serving his term in January 1899. The one-room office soon proved to be too small and the staff moved to larger quarters in the nearby Oyster Bay Bank Building.

In 1899, when Roosevelt was elected Governor of New York, his staff had their offices here in the Octagon Hotel. The busy nature of the hotel however became unsuitable and the governor’s staff moved to the Oyster Bay Bank Building on Audrey Avenue.

The German Ambassador, Baron Speck von Sternburg, was the first foreign representative to be presented outside of the White House. When visiting Oyster Bay he took rooms in the Octagon Hotel during his visit. The Secret Service were also reputed to have stayed at the Octagon Hotel, including in 1902 when "the hotel was overcrowded with Secret Service men, reporters, and politicians."

Mary Lavelle took the Octagon Hotel into the 20th century, but a new owner, Charles Davenport, saw his customer base decline as newer hotels in the village competed for clientele. After ten years, he sold the building to Edward Fisher, who turned it into Oyster Bay’s first Ford automobile dealership. It has been used for various automotive businesses ever since. It is the only known octagonal building in this part of Long Island.

== Present condition ==
A proposal has emerged to restore the building to its original condition. This is being reviewed by the Town of Oyster Bay. Community groups have expressed their strong interest of seeing this building tied to the heritage of Theodore Roosevelt restored in a sensitive and thoughtful manner.

== See also ==
- Oyster Bay History Walk
- List of Town of Oyster Bay Landmarks
- National Register of Historic Places listings in Nassau County, New York
