= Moore's Building =

Historic commercial building in New York, United States

- U.S. National Register of Historic Places
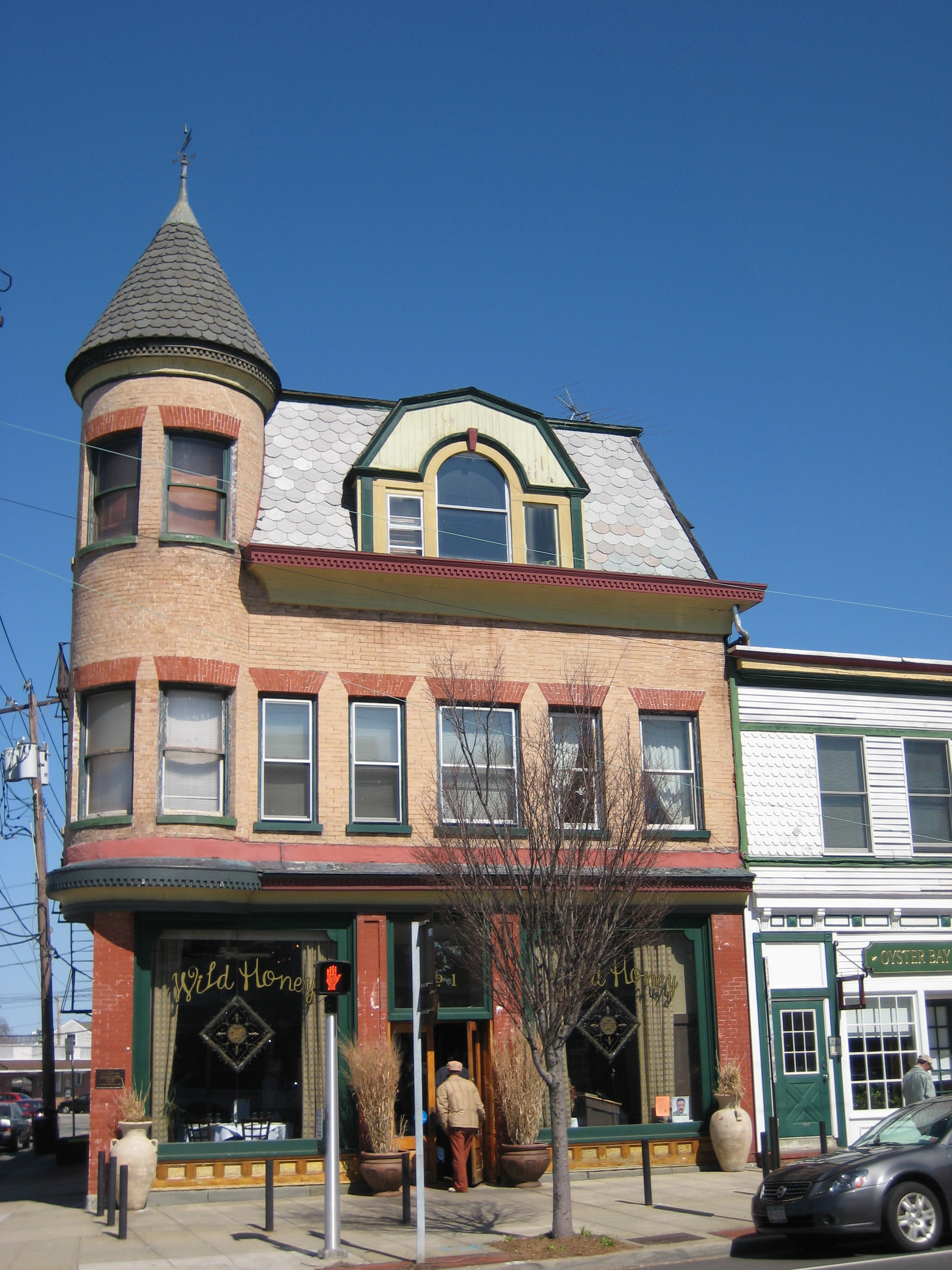
- Moore's Building, 2008

- Location within New York Location within the United States
- Location: Oyster Bay, New York
- Coordinates: 40°52′21.7″N 73°31′49.18″W
- Area: less than one acre
- Built: 1901
- Architectural style: Queen Anne
- NRHP reference No.: 96001043
- Added to NRHP: September 30, 1996

Moore's Building is a historic building located in the downtown area of the Hamlet of Oyster Bay and listed on the National Register of Historic Places. First built in 1901, the building gained significance when Theodore Roosevelt had his staff take offices here while he served as U.S. President. The Moore's Building is listed on the National Register of Historic Places, a Town of Oyster Bay Landmark, and a featured site on the Oyster Bay History Walk audio walking tour.

== History ==
This landmark building with its Queen Anne style tower and cornices is called the Moore Building, but when James Moore originally built it in 1891 to house his corner grocery store, it had a much more humble appearance. It began as a one-story structure, made mostly of wood with a section of brick on the front wrapping around each side for about 10 feet (3.0 m). Mr. Moore also built a row of attached wood buildings extending up East Main Street, which housed various shops such as Oyster Bay's first ice cream parlor, a furniture store, and an undertaker. Only five years after they had been built, several of these buildings were destroyed by a fire which broke out in the middle of the night.

Fortunately, the newly formed Atlantic Steamer Fire Company had invested in the Silsby Steamer, which extinguished the fire in time to save Moore's Grocery. In 1901, Moore built the statuesque building you see today, incorporating the original brick facade. It included a large ground floor for his growing grocery business and high-ceiling upper floors, in which public meetings could be held just as they had been across the street in Old Fleets Hall. But these upper floors were to rise to ever greater fame - when President Theodore Roosevelt outgrew his suite of offices at the Oyster Bay Bank Building on Audrey Avenue. While Sagamore Hill served as the Summer White House, Moore's Building now housed the Summer Executive Offices where Secretary William Loeb Jr. and his staff conducted any business of the President which did not require his personal attention.

Secretary Loeb installed telegraph and telephone "hotlines" which connected directly to Sagamore Hill and the White House in Washington, D.C., and in 1903, the first "round the world" cable was transmitted from this building.

After a restoration in 1995, several restaurants have occupied the building.

== See also ==
- Oyster Bay History Walk
- List of Town of Oyster Bay Landmarks
- National Register of Historic Places listings in Nassau County, New York
