= George Roe Van De Water =

American Episcopal Priest

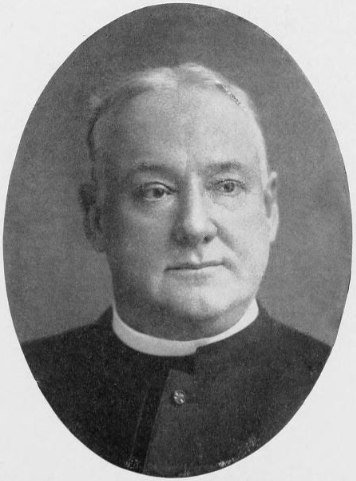
- Born: April 25, 1854; Flushing, New York, US
- Died: March 15, 1925 (aged 70); New York, New York, US
- Burial place: Youngs Memorial Cemetery
- Education: General Theological Seminary; Cornell University
- Occupation: Priest
- Spouse: Cornelia Townsend Youngs (m. 1879)

George Roe Van De Water (April 25, 1854 – March 15, 1925) was an Episcopal priest and a major proponent of the compatibility of Freemasonry with Christianity. A prominent American of Dutch descent, he was a graduate of the General Theological Seminary and a member of the Saint Nicholas Society of the City of New York and the Holland Society of New York.

== Biography ==
Van De Water was born on April 25, 1854 in Flushing, New York to John Titus Van Der Water and Ellen Fowler. He is a descendant of Jacobus van de Water, one of the last Dutch mayors of New York City.

Van Der Water earned a B.S. from Cornell University in 1874, where he later became an alumnus trustee. In 1879 he married Cornelia Townsend Youngs of Oyster Bay, a descendant of Elizabeth Fones.

Van De Water served as the rector of Christ Church in Oyster Bay, and accompanied Theodore Roosevelt to Cuba during the Spanish American War and became the chaplain of the 71st New York Volunteers. He served as rector of St. Andrew's Episcopal Church in Harlem from 1880 to 1920, as well as the chaplain of Columbia University from 1892 to 1905. He was also the Chaplain General for the General Society Daughters of the Revolution 1776.

After retiring from St. Andrew's he became the rector of the Church (later Chapel) of the Beloved Disciple in Manhattan's Upper East Side, which later became St. Thomas More Roman Catholic Church.

Van De Water died at his home in Manhattan on March 15, 1925, and was buried at Youngs Memorial Cemetery in Oyster Bay.
