= Henry G. Walter Jr. =

American businessman

- Born: September 25, 1910; Queens, New York, United States
- Died: November 20, 2000 (aged 90); Manhattan, New York
- Education: Columbia University (BA), Columbia Law School (LLB)
- Occupation: Businessman
- Known for: Pioneer in aromatherapy
- Spouse: Rosalind Walter (m. 1956)

Henry G. Walter Jr. (September 25, 1910 – November 11, 2000) was an American businessman who served as the former chairman and chief executive of International Flavors and Fragrances. He was also considered a pioneer in the field of aromatherapy.

== Early life ==
Walter was born on September 25, 1910, in Queens, New York. He attended Newtown High School, graduated from Columbia University in 1931 and received a law degree from Columbia Law School in 1933.

== Career ==
He spent a decade with Cravath, Swaine & Moore before serving as general counsel for the Heyden Chemical Corporation. He started the law firm Fulton, Walter & Halley in 1945 and stayed with the firm until he joined International Flavors and Fragrances.

Walter became president of International Flavors and Fragrances in 1962 and was named chairman and CEO in 1970. He was subsequently credited for building International Flavors and Fragrances into the world's largest producer and supplier of scents during his tenure. He was called a pioneer "in the burgeoning field of aromatherapy and established a tradition of innovation and research within the industry" by Harvard Business School. He retired from the company in 1985.

Walter was a trustee of the American Museum of Natural History and served as the vice president of the board of trustees from 1981 to 1988. He was also a fellow and a trustee of the Morgan Library & Museum for over twenty years.

Walter was also a founding member of the Philadelphia-based Monell Chemical Senses Center, a research institute dedicated to basic research on the senses of taste and smell.

== In popular culture ==
A fictionalized version of Hank Walter, Dan Logan, was portrayed by actor Josh Charles in the Lifetime TV series Masters of Sex.

== Personal life ==
He was described as an "earthy, saucy kind of guy" with a language that is "earthy, rich in sexual allusion" by a Fortune reporter.

Walter died on November 11, 2000, at 90. He was married to Rosalind P. Walter, the inspiration behind the WWII cultural icon, Rosie the Riveter.
