= Oyster Bay-East Norwich Central School District =

School district in the U.S. state of New York

Coordinates: 40.873°N 73.527°W

Address
- 1 McCouns Lane Oyster Bay, New York, 11771; United States

District information
- Type: Public
- Grades: PreK–12
- NCES District ID: 3622290

Students and staff
- Students: 1,514 (2020–2021)
- Teachers: 145.77 (on an FTE basis)
- Staff: 224.33 (on an FTE basis)
- Student–teacher ratio: 10.39:1

Other information
- Website: www.obenschools.org

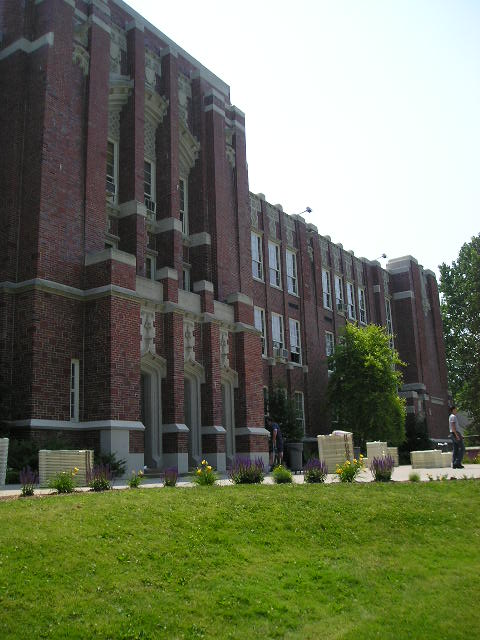
Oyster Bay High School

Oyster Bay-East Norwich Central School District is a school district headquartered in Oyster Bay hamlet in the town of Oyster Bay, New York on Long Island.

The district was created on July 1, 1960, by the action of the voters in the former Oyster Bay and East Norwich School Districts. The district's 13.1 square miles (34 km^{2}) boundaries include the hamlets of Oyster Bay and East Norwich and the incorporated villages of Centre Island, Oyster Bay Cove, Cove Neck, and portions of Mill Neck, Muttontown, Laurel Hollow, and Upper Brookville. There are three schools currently in the district: Roosevelt Elementary School (Grades K-2), James H. Vernon Middle School (Grades 3–6), and Oyster Bay High School (Grades 7–12).

== History ==
The first schoolhouse in Oyster Bay was built before the American Revolutionary War by Thomas Youngs, a short distance up Cove Hill from his homestead in Oyster Bay Cove. It was replaced in 1802 by the Oyster Bay Academy on East Main Street, led by the Reverend Marmaduke Earle. The first public school began in 1845, in a small wood building on South Street where Valley National Bank is currently located.

It is no mistake that a street on the hill near St. Dominic's Church is called School Street; its name was changed from Petticoat Lane when a much larger public schoolhouse was built in 1872. By the 1890s it too had become overcrowded forcing some classes to meet in the dank basement and even in private homes. This led to the construction of Oyster Bay's first high school completed in 1901 on Anstice Street.

== Schools ==
- Oyster Bay High School (Grades 7-12) (Oyster Bay hamlet)
- James H. Vernon Intermediate School (Grades 3–6) (Village of Upper Brookville)
- Theodore Roosevelt Elementary School (Grades K-2) (Oyster Bay hamlet)
- Pre-Kindergarten at Roosevelt (Oyster Bay Hamlet)
