= Sean Labanowski =

Israeli-American basketball player

Sean Labanowski שון לבנובסקי
No. 15 – Hapoel Afula
- Position: Power forward / center
- League: Liga Leumit

Personal information
- Born: December 9, 1992 (age 33) Boynton Beach, Florida, U.S.
- Listed height: 6 ft 8 in (2.03 m)
- Listed weight: 245 lb (111 kg)

Career information
- NBA draft: 2014: undrafted
- Playing career: 2010–present

Career history
- 2010–2011: Maccabi Tel Aviv
- 2011–2013: Maccabi Haifa
- 2012–2013: →Maccabi Kiryat Bialik
- 2013–2014: Maccabi Ashdod
- 2014: Hapoel Kfar Saba
- 2014: Elitzur Ramla
- 2014–2016: Elitzur Yavne
- 2016–2017: Ironi Ramat Gan
- 2018–2019: Hapoel Gilboa Galil
- 2019–2021: Hapoel Afula
- 2021–2023: Elitzur Shomron
- 2024–present: Hapoel Afula

Career highlights
- Israeli League champion (2011); Israeli State Cup winner (2011); Israeli League Cup winner (2010)

Sean Leon Labanowski (Hebrew: שון לבנובסקי; born December 9, 1992) is an Israeli-American professional basketball player for Hapoel Afula of the Israeli Liga Leumit.

== Early life ==
Labanowski was born in Boynton Beach, Florida. Labanowski lived his first 6 years in the United States before growing up in Hefer Valley, Israel. He played for Beitar Binyamina youth team and Sharet Netanya high school team. Labanowski joined Maccabi Tel Aviv youth team in his late teens.

== Professional career ==
In 2010, Labanowski started his professional career with Maccabi Tel Aviv. On May 12, 2011, he made his professional debut in a playoff win over Barak Netanya.

On September 8, 2011, Labanowski signed a three-year deal with Maccabi Haifa.

On November 28, 2012, Labanowski was loaned to Maccabi Kiryat Bialik of the Israeli National League. In 22 games played for Kiryat Bialik, he averaged 10 points and 4.4 rebounds per game.

On August 21, 2013, Labanowski signed a three-year deal with Maccabi Ashdod.

On February 14, 2018, Labanowski signed with Hapoel Gilboa Galil for the rest of the season. Labanowski helped Gilboa Galil to reach the 2018 Israeli League Playoffs, where they eventually lost to Hapoel Jerusalem.

On August 1, 2018, Labanowski signed a one-year contract extension with Gilboa Galil.

On July 23, 2019, Labanowski signed with Hapoel Afula of the Israeli National League for the 2019–20 season.

== Israel national team ==
Labanowski was a member of the U-16, U-18 and U-20 Israel national teams.

== Personal life ==
His father, Kenny Labanowski, is an American-Israeli former basketball player who played in Israel in the '80s.
