= Railroad Yardmasters of America =

Union that represented yardmasters in the United States

- Merged: United Transportation Union
- Founded: 2 December 1918
- Dissolved: 1 October 1985
- Headquarters: Columbus, Ohio
- Location: United States
- Affiliations: AFL–CIO

The Railroad Yardmasters of America (RYA) was a union that represented yardmasters in the United States from 1912 until its merger with the United Transportation Union in 1985 which later became the SMART Union in 2014.

== Foundation ==
The Railroad Yardmasters of America was organized on 2 December 1918 to handle abuses by railroad management. Membership was open to "any male white person of good moral character actually employed as general yardmaster, assistant general yardmaster, yardmaster, assistant yardmaster, and station masters." The first national convention was held in December 1918. The union had its headquarters in Columbus, Ohio. The union was independent, not affiliated with the American Federation of Labor.

The union aimed for a universal eight-hour work day with two days of rest each month and an annual two-week vacation. It also sought improved wages and working conditions. The union's bylaws gave it the power to levy assessments for unspecified purposes, saying the executive board could "levy assessments upon all the members affected when in its opinion such assessments are necessary."

== History ==
By 1921 the union had about 8,500 members, about three quarters of all yardmasters in the United States. A general railway strike was called for 1 November 1921. The grand president of the Railroad Yardmasters of America, J.L. Cone said the members of his union would stay on the job. Yardmasters on the Southern Pacific Railroad organized in 1938 and joined the Railroad Yardmasters of America in 1941. Twelve years later they withdrew and formed the independent Western Railway Supervisors Association, which merged with the Transportation-Communications Union in 1983.

The union was one of 26 in the United States that limited its membership to white men through its constitution or rituals.

In 1950 there were a series of disputes between the railroads and yard employees in connection with the 40-hour week. That year the government seized the railroads. The government's Railway Labor Act Emergency Board ruled on 15 June 1950 in favor of the 40-hour basic work week, overtime pay for work in excess of 40 hours, and other improvements. When the railroad owners rejected this John R. Steelman, the President's representative, defined a proposed settlement that included wage increases and cost of living adjustments. The Railroad Yardmasters of America, Railroad Yardmasters of North America and the Switchmen's Union of America agreed to settle with some railroads based on the Steelman formula effective 1 October 1950, but other operating unions held out.

In Railroad Yardmasters of America v Robert O. Harris (1983) the union challenged the authority of the National Mediation Board on the basis that it had no quorum, establishing the "Yardmasters exception", which came to be used in other labor relations cases.

== Dissolution ==
In 1985 the RYA voted to affiliate with the United Transportation Union. The merger took effect on 1 October 1985.
