= Edward H. Swan House =

Historic house in New York, United States

- U.S. National Register of Historic Places
- Location within New York Location within the United States
- Location: Cove Neck, New York
- Coordinates: 40°52′38″N 73°30′12″W
- Area: 4 acres (1.6 ha)
- Built: 1859
- Architectural style: Second Empire
- NRHP reference No.: 76001233
- Added to NRHP: May 24, 1976

Edward H. Swan House is a historic home located in the village of Cove Neck, New York on Long Island. It was built in 1859 in the Second Empire style. The rectangular house is built of double brick walls spaced nine inches apart. It is a substantial 2 1/2-story residence topped by a mansard roof of hexagonal shaped slate. The main entrance features a double entrance door beneath a cast iron portico. Also on the property are several barns and a board and batten-sided cottage.

It was listed on the National Register of Historic Places in 1976.

The house has been confused/conflated with one that was owned by John McEnroe Sr., father of the tennis pro, before becoming the home of John McEnroe Jr and his wife Tatum O'Neal. On January 25, 1990, their property at 13 Tennis Court Road was used as a makeshift command post, triage location, and morgue following the crash of Avianca Flight 052 which crashed into the hills of Cove Neck after running out of fuel.
