= Rosalind P. Walter =

American philanthropist and humanities advocate (1924–2020)

- Born: Rosalind Palmer; June 25, 1924; Brooklyn, New York, U.S.
- Died: March 4, 2020 (aged 95); Manhattan, New York, U.S.
- Occupation: Philanthropist
- Known for: Support of public television and the humanities; inspiration for the World War II song, "Rosie the Riveter"
- Spouses: Henry S. Thompson (m. 1946; div. 1954); Henry Glendon Walter Jr. (m. 1956; died 2000)
- Parent(s): Carleton Humphreys Palmer and Winthrop (Bushnell) Palmer

Rosalind P. Walter (née Palmer; June 25, 1924 – March 4, 2020) was an American philanthropist and humanities advocate who was best known for her late 20th- and early 21st-century support for public television programming across the United States. She also contributed to the improvement of educational opportunities for disadvantaged youth and the protection of wildlife and open space areas.

During World War II, she inspired the creation of "Rosie the Riveter", a song about civilian women employed in the war industry which was penned by Redd Evans and John Jacob Loeb and popularized by Kay Kyser and The Four Vagabonds.

"Known by the nickname Roz", according to executives of WNET, New York's public television station, Walter "cared deeply about the quality and educational value of public television and understood the importance of reaching the broadest possible audience".

== Early life ==
Rosalind Palmer was born on June 25, 1924, in Brooklyn, New York, a daughter of the late Winthrop (Bushnell) Palmer, chair and professor of literature and fine arts at Long Island University, and Carleton Humphreys Palmer, president of E. R. Squibb and Sons, a Brooklyn, New York-based pharmaceutical company which was founded in 1892 and is now a subsidiary of Bristol-Myers Squibb Company.

Raised in New York City, she was educated at Connecticut's Ethel Walker School. In 1940, she lived in Manhattan with her parents and older siblings, Lowell and Winthrop.

During the 1950s, she relocated with her family to Centre Island in Nassau County New York.

== World War II ==
Following her graduation from high school, Rosalind Palmer became one of many young women to secure jobs in the war industry during World War II. "The powerful female image of Rosie (the Riveter) was developed under the auspices of the War Production Board to inspire patriotic behavior," according to heritage writer Ginny McPartland, who reported in 2013 that the idea to give "the female war worker the name of 'Rosie' probably started with a newspaper story about Rosalind P. Walter, an aircraft factory worker in New York." Hired for the night shift, Palmer was, in fact, employed as "a riveter on Corsair fighter planes", according to The New York Times. Additional sources have noted that she worked on F4U marine gull-winged fighter airplanes, and that she "broke records for speed on the production line, advocating for equal pay for her female co-workers.

In 1942, she inspired Redd Evans and John Jacob Loeb to write the song, "Rosie the Riveter", which was then recorded by Kay Kyser and The Four Vagabonds.

In 1943, The Roanoke Times reprinted an article from a New York newspaper, which had described Palmer as follows: "We really have a Rosie the Riveter, who is Rosalind Palmer, 19, a dark-tressed society doll, who had just finished a year of hard work as a night-shift welder at the Sikorsky aircraft plant at Bridgeport, Conn." Adding that she was renting a room that summer in Fairfield, which enabled her to commute "25 miles to her job," she said she had been teamed with "a crackerjack welder" who helped her to become confident and competent in her work on fighter planes and would "'keep at this job until the war is over."

== Post-war life and philanthropy ==
Following war's end, Rosalind Palmer wed Henry S. Thompson, a lieutenant with the United States Navy Reserve. They were married at the Fifth Avenue Presbyterian Church in New York on June 22, 1946, and became the parents of son Henry. They divorced in 1954.

In 1956, Rosalind (Palmer) Thompson wed Henry Glendon Walter Jr. (1910–2000) in Manhattan. A friend of the Palmer family who was employed by the law firm of Fulton, Walter & Halley in 1945, Henry G. Walter Jr. later went on to become president (1962) and chairman and chief executive (1970) of International Flavors and Fragrances, a position he held until his retirement in 1985.

Throughout their marriage, they were jointly and independently active in a range of philanthropic activities, including serving as trustees for the American Museum of Natural History and Long Island University, which awarded her an honorary degree in 1983, and noted in 2000 that "Hank and Roz have been first citizens and benefactors of this University in every respect."

In 1951, she established the Walter Foundation, which is known today as The Rosalind P. Walter Foundation. Based in New York City, this private non-operating foundation was designated as a 501(c)(3) organization by the U.S. Internal Revenue Service in May 1953.

Best known for underwriting public television programming in the United States, she supported the PBS series, Great Performances, and such documentary films as: Blakeway Productions' Shakespeare Uncovered, Ken Burns' The Roosevelts: An Intimate History, Ric Burns' The Pilgrims, and Susan Lacy's Emmy Award-winning American Masters series for WNET.

In recognition of her history of giving, WNET appointed Rosalind P. Walter to its board of directors in 1989. Interviewed by The New York Times in 1994, station president Bill Baker observed, "She is one of those wonderful people that every nonprofit has to have.... We get a lot of people who come up to the altar with great suggestions and then we have to scamper for the funds. But she is usually the closing dollars that get a program over the hump." By the time that WNET leaders delivered the organization's Annual Report for 2007–2008, she had donated at least $5,000,000 to that public television station.

She also provided support to PBS NewsHour, served in various leadership capacities for the Paley Center for Media and established a journalism scholarship at Long Island University.

Walter's mother, Winthrop Palmer, died in 1988, and her husband, Henry Glendon Walter Jr., died at the age of 90 on November 11, 2000, at New York Hospital.

A Centre Island, New York home that had once been owned by Walter was purchased by the American singer-songwriter, composer and pianist Billy Joel.

=== USTA, the International Tennis Hall of Fame, wellness, and public education ===
A member of the board of overseers for the Grenville Baker Boys & Girls Club and lifetime supporter of its annual fund, Rosalind P. Walter was inducted into the club's Hall of Fame in 2016. She was also a member of the National Committee for Inner City Drug Prevention.

A Life Trustee of the International Tennis Hall of Fame in Newport, Rhode Island, she was also appointed by the United States Tennis Association to the board of its USTA Serves program, and provided the funding for the first college scholarships awarded under that initiative. Named in her honor in 2011, that program now annually grants funding "to one male and one female high-academic achieving student of good character who is entering a four-year college or university program" and who "share Walter's belief in always putting forth one's best effort and giving back to one's community to make it a better place." Each student selected is "eligible to receive $2,500 per year for a total of up to $10,000 to cover costs of tuition, room and board and educational materials."

=== Wildlife preservation and land conservation ===
A member of the board of trustees of the North Shore Wildlife Sanctuary, she contributed to efforts by the North Shore Land Alliance in 2014 to purchase the 28-acre Humes property in Mill Neck, New York, in order to preserve the meadow, freshwater woodlands, woodland, and nine structures located there.

In 2016, the North Shore Land Alliance listed "Mrs. Henry G. Walter Jr./The Rosalind P. Walter Foundation" on its registry of individuals and organizations who had donated to the Alliance in 2015 at the "$25,000 to $49,999" level.

== Death ==
Walter died in her home in Manhattan on March 4, 2020.

== See also ==
- Philanthropy in the United States
