= Sea Cliff Firehouse =

Historic fire station at Sea Cliff, Nassau County, New York

- U.S. National Register of Historic Places
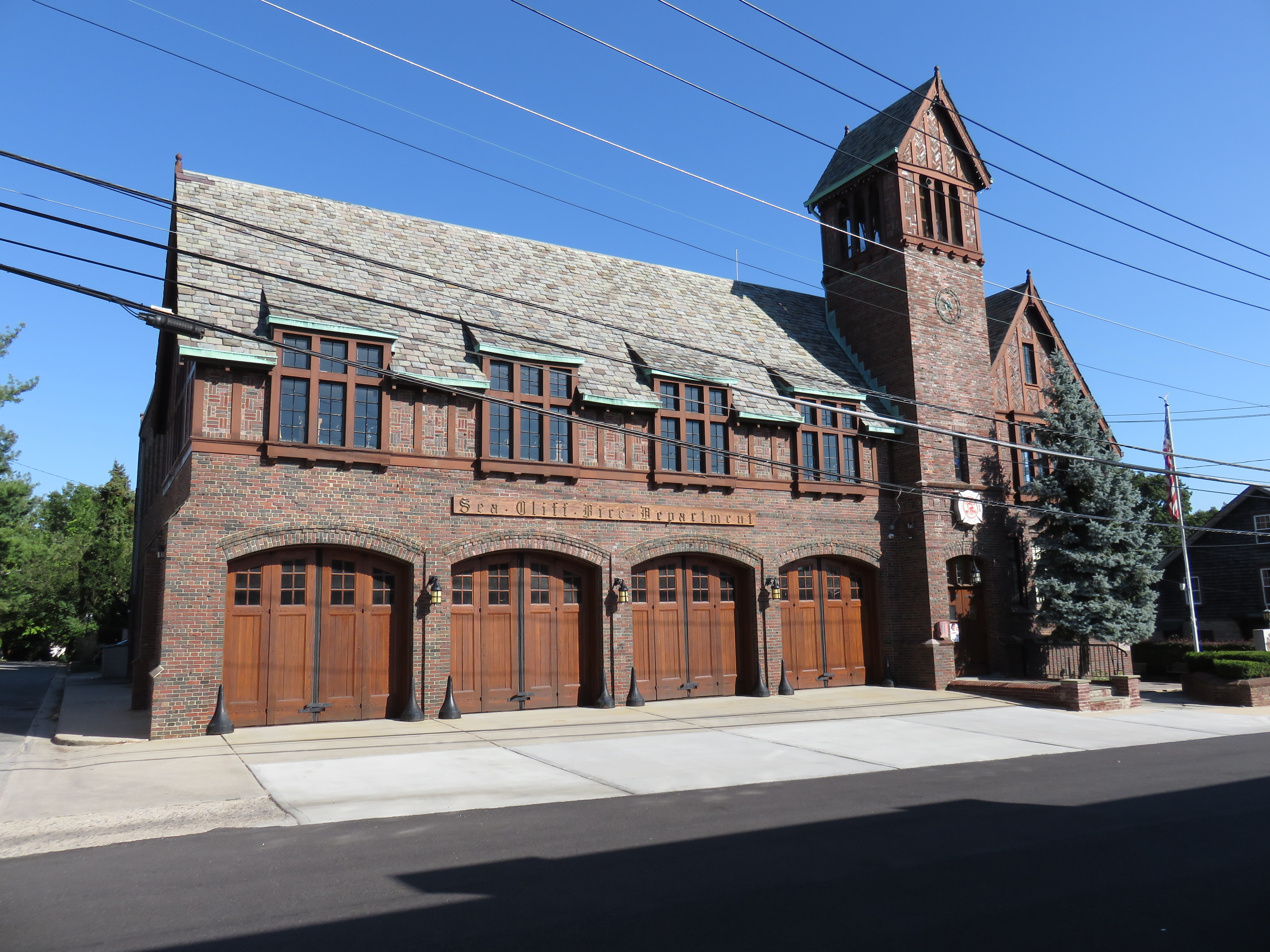
- The firehouse in September 2015

- Location within New York Location within the United States
- Location: Roslyn Avenue, Sea Cliff, New York
- Coordinates: 40.848602°N 73.644594°W
- Area: less than one acre
- Built: 1931
- Architect: Meyer, Jack
- Architectural style: Tudor Revival
- NRHP reference No.: 03000408
- Added to NRHP: May 18, 2003

The Sea Cliff Firehouse is a historic fire station located at Sea Cliff, Nassau County, New York. The fire department was established in 1884, and the firehouse was built in 1931. It is a 1 1/2-story, Tudor Revival style brick building with ornamental half timbering. It has four engine bays with segmental arched openings and a steep slate roof with dormers. It features a bell tower topped by a slate gable roof.

It was added to the National Register of Historic Places on May 18, 2003.

== See also ==
- National Register of Historic Places listings in Oyster Bay (town), New York
