= Oyster Bay Bank Building =

Coordinates: 40°52′22.46″N 73°31′51.51″W

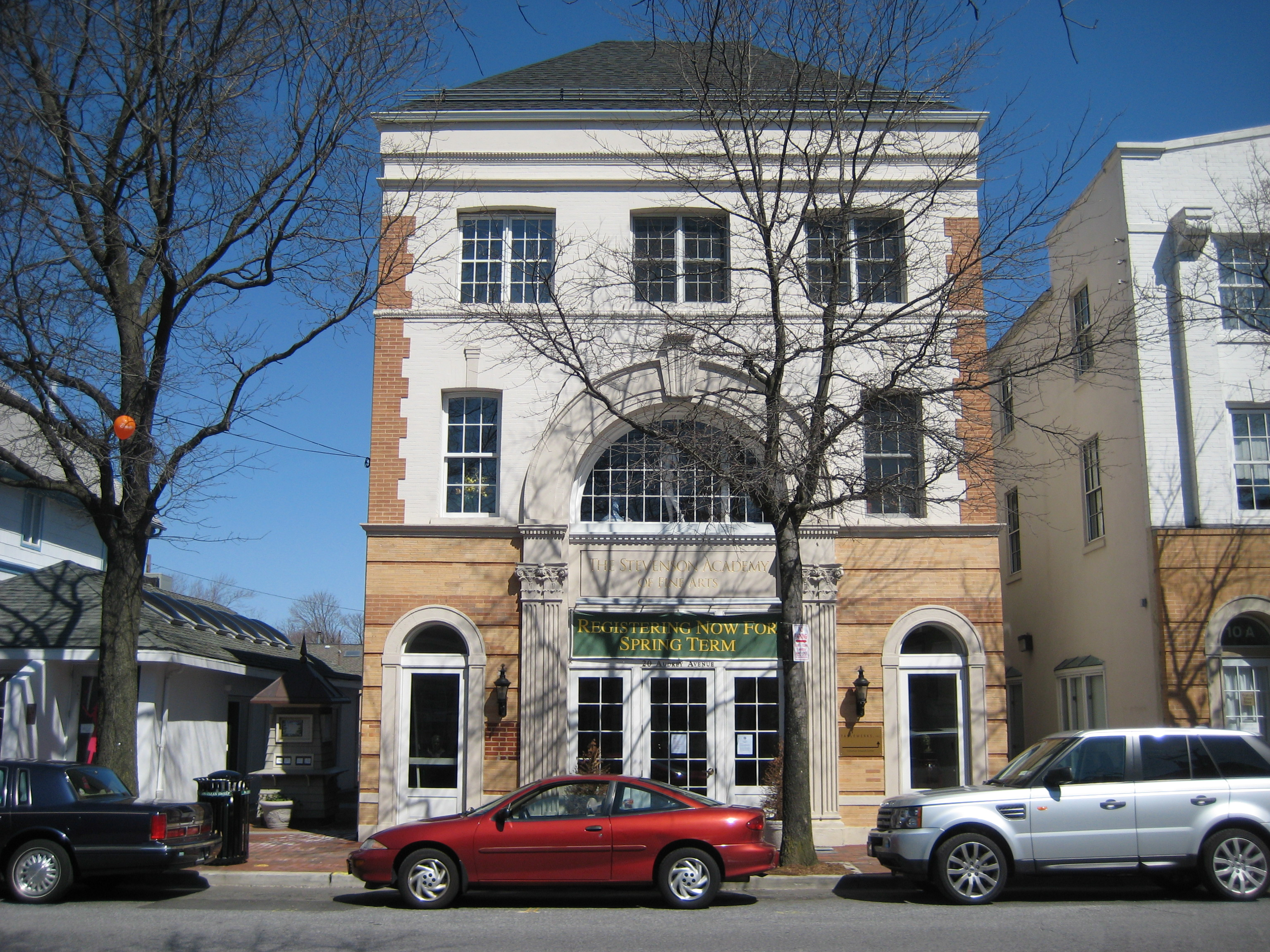
View (2008)

The Oyster Bay Bank Building was constructed in 1891 and served as the first bank in Oyster Bay on Long Island in New York State. In addition to the bank, other users have included the Masons of Matinecock Lodge, Theodore Roosevelt while he served as Governor of New York, and architect Edward Durrell Stone. Today this building is a featured site on the Oyster Bay History Walk audio walking tour.

== History ==
This building was constructed in 1891 to be the first bank in Oyster Bay. Built of sturdy brick, it originally consisted of 3 1/2 stories as well as a basement. The directors of the Oyster Bay Bank leased the third floor to the Masons of Matinecock Lodge #806, the second floor to various doctors and lawyers, part of the basement to a pool hall and tobacco shop, and used the first floor for the bank.

When Theodore Roosevelt was Governor of New York in 1900 he rented several rooms on the second floor. In 1901 he became a member of the Matinecock Lodge, attending Masonic meetings on the third floor as often as his schedule would permit.

When President, Theodore Roosevelt continued to use the Oyster Bay Bank Building. One newspaper recounts how in 1902, a flag was brought from Washington and raised from a new halyard at the Oyster Bay Bank Building, called the "little White House" in the article.

In the summer of 1905 the Oyster Bay Bank Building was chosen as the location for Roosevelt's telegraph office, while the clerical force worked a half-block away in the Moore's Building.

Perhaps the most fascinating fact about this building is that it was actually lowered. Originally the building was set back from the sidewalk about ten feet with a flight of wide stops leading up to the entrance. Local contractors excavated under the basement and through a system of hundreds of jacks and rollers the massive building was both lowered and brought forward.

This elaborate procedure took place on May 20, 1927 a day most people remember for Charles Lindbergh’s historic solo flight across the Atlantic. The lowering and moving were accomplished in only 18 hours. A 3 story extension was added to the back of the building. Now people could enter the main floor from street level and with the new additions the Oyster Bay Bank could better serve the growing community of Oyster Bay. Recently, the building has undergone extensive renovations, both inside and out, insuring its place as one of the most attractive and productive buildings on Audrey Avenue.

== See also ==
- Oyster Bay History Walk
- List of Town of Oyster Bay Landmarks
- National Register of Historic Places listings in Nassau County, New York
