= Oyster Bay High School =

Coordinates: 40°52′15″N 73°31′33″W

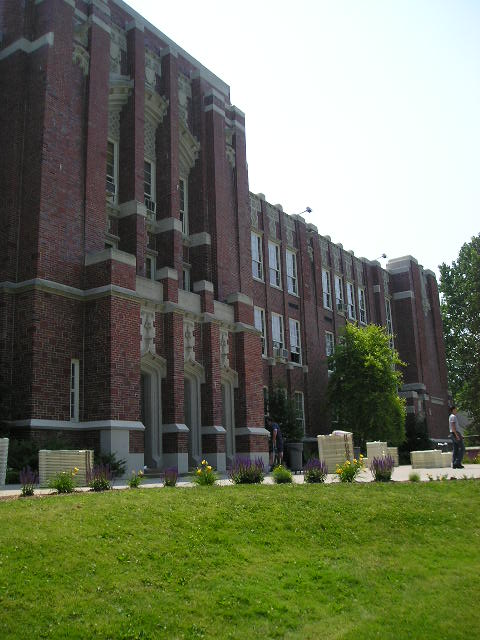
- Oyster Bay High School in June, 2005
- 150 East Main Street; Oyster Bay, New York 11771; United States

Information
- Type: Public school
- Established: 1929
- School district: Oyster Bay – East Norwich Central School District
- NCES District ID: 3622290
- NCES School ID: 362229003147
- Principal: Jessica Bader
- Teaching staff: 50.19 (on an FTE basis)
- Grades: 9–12
- Enrollment: 412 (2024–25)
- Student to teacher ratio: 8.21
- Campus type: Suburban
- Colors: Purple and gold
- Mascot: The Baymen
- Newspaper: Oyster Bay Harbour Voice
- Website: www.obenschools.org

Oyster Bay High School is a public high school located in Oyster Bay, New York, United States. The school is a part of the Oyster Bay-East Norwich Central School District.

As of the 2024–25 school year, the school had an enrollment of 412 students and 50.91 classroom teachers (on an FTE basis), for a student–teacher ratio of 8.21. There were 103 students (25% of enrollment) eligible for free lunch and 15 (3.6% of students) eligible for reduced-cost lunch.

== History ==
The present high school building was completed in 1929. Though primarily used as a high school, the building was originally built to house grades K through 12. Oyster Bay's original facade is an example of Art Deco styling, and includes has some interesting details such as eagles and the letters “B” and “G”, which originally indicated separate doors for the girls and boys to enter the building. In February 1929, the children did just that, carrying their books and personal belongings from the old school building to this one. At the time of its opening, the new school building contained many modern features, such as classroom loudspeakers, an auditorium with a balcony and projection booth, and a central vacuuming system.

Oyster Bay phased into a 'closed-campus' model beginning in 1986, citing the district's responsibly for its students during school hours.

Though it was modern in its day, the school's gym had become outdated by the 1990s; it was the oldest in Nassau County when the district replaced it in 2000 with a new, state-of-the-art gymnasium, dedicated to Howard Imhof. The 2000 additions also included a new library-media center with 18 computer stations, ushering the district's high school building into the new century.

== Notable alumni ==
- Marie Colvin (class of 1974), journalist who worked for the British newspaper The Sunday Times. She died while covering the siege of Homs in Syria
- John Knowles, novelist, transferred to Phillips Exeter Academy
- Ken Labanowski, (class of 1977), American-Israeli basketball player
- Jackie Martling, comedian, starred on the Howard Stern Show
- Heather Matarazzo, (class of 2000) actress
- Thomas Pynchon (class of 1953), novelist of Gravity's Rainbow and The Crying of Lot 49, once awarded "student of the year"
- Lee Ranaldo (class of 1974), musician and writer, co-founder of Sonic Youth
- Ken Rosenthal, baseball sportscaster and journalist
- Tage Thompson, professional hockey player

== See also ==
- List of Town of Oyster Bay Landmarks
- National Register of Historic Places listings in Nassau County, New York
- Oyster Bay History Walk
