= Sagamore Hill =

Estate in Cove Neck, New York

- Sagamore Hill National Historic Site
- U.S. National Register of Historic Places
- U.S. National Historic Site
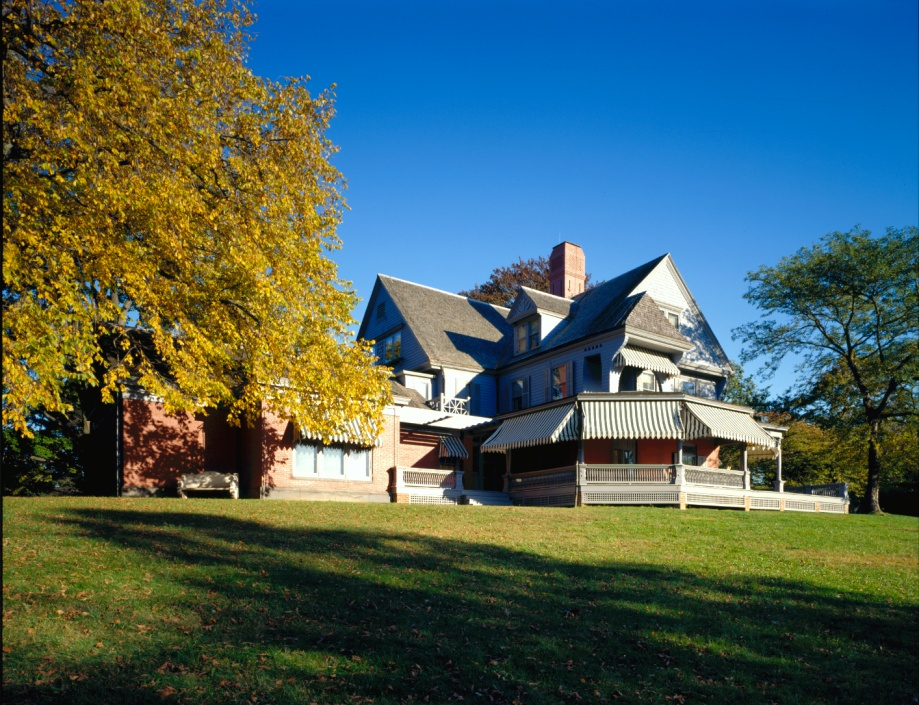
- Sagamore Hill

- Location within New York Location within the United States
- Interactive map showing Sagamore Hill’s location
- Location: Cove Neck, New York
- Coordinates: 40°53′8″N 73°29′51″W
- Area: 83.02 acres (33.60 ha)
- Built: 1884
- Architect: Lamb & Rich; C. Grant LaFarge
- Architectural style: Queen Anne
- Visitation: 122,124 (2025)
- Website: Sagamore Hill National Historic Site
- NRHP reference No.: 66000096

Significant dates
- Added to NRHP: October 15, 1966
- Designated NHS: July 25, 1962

Sagamore Hill is the former home of the 26th president of the United States, Theodore Roosevelt, from 1885 until his death in 1919. It is located in Cove Neck, New York, near Oyster Bay on the North Shore of Long Island, 25 miles (40 km) east of Manhattan. It is now the Sagamore Hill National Historic Site, which includes the Theodore Roosevelt Museum in a later building on the grounds.

== History ==
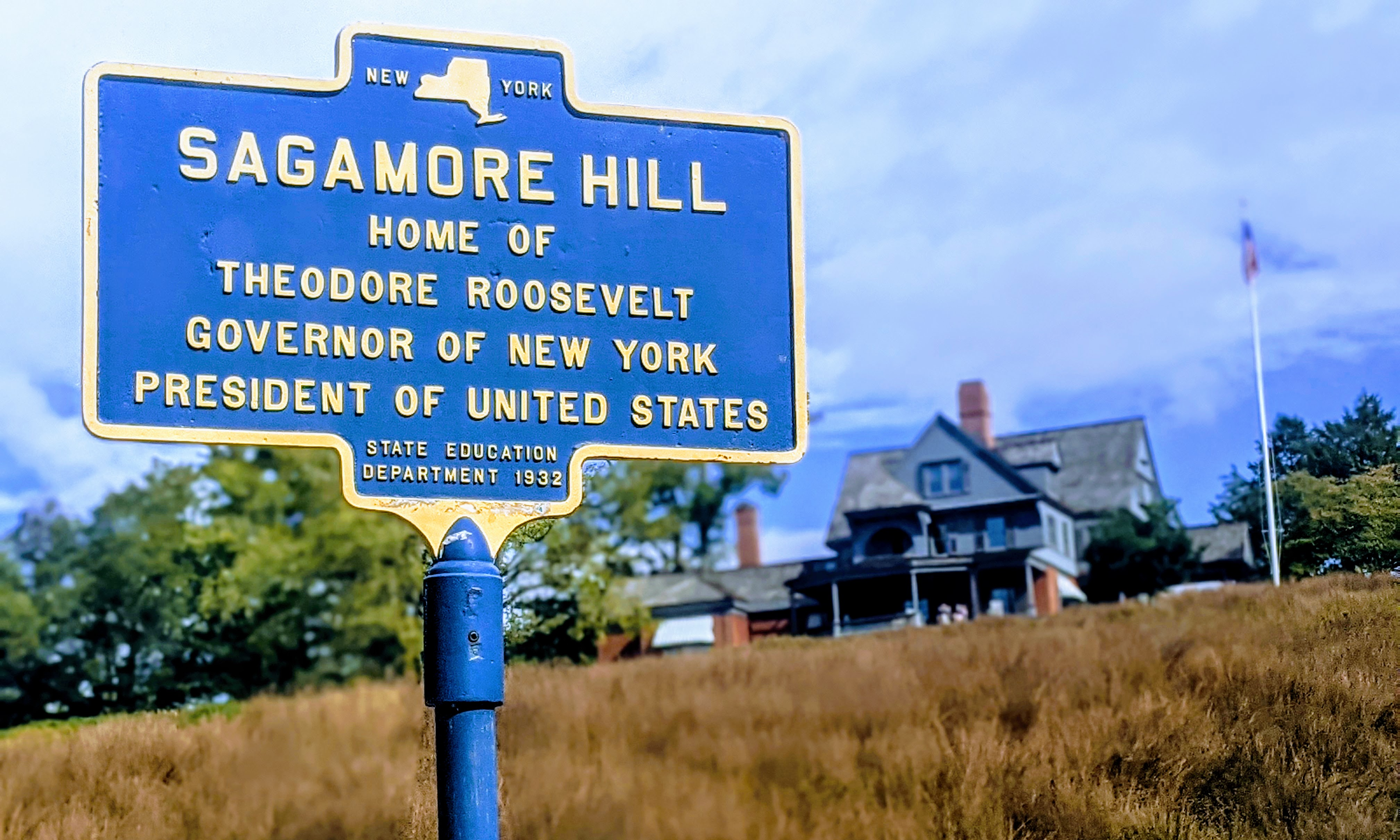
New York Historical Marker outside Sagamore Hill

A native of New York City, Theodore Roosevelt spent many summers of his youth on extended vacations with his family in the Oyster Bay area. In 1880, 22-year-old Roosevelt purchased 155 acres (63 ha) of land for $30,000 (equal to $1,000,862 today) on Cove Neck, a small peninsula roughly 2 miles (3.2 km) northeast of the hamlet of Oyster Bay. In 1881, his uncle James A. Roosevelt had an estate home built several hundred feet west of the Sagamore Hill property.

In 1884, Theodore Roosevelt hired the New York architectural firm of Lamb & Rich to design a shingle-style, Queen Anne home for the property. The 22-room house building commenced in May, 1884, completed by John A. Wood and Son, of Lawrence, Long Island, in March, 1885 for $16,975 (equal to $608,271 today). Roosevelt stayed there in the summer of 1885 with his sister and daughter for the hunts and moved into the house with second wife Edith in March, 1887. Roosevelt had originally planned to name the house "Leeholm" after his wife, Alice Hathaway Lee Roosevelt. However, she died in 1884 and Roosevelt remarried in 1886, so he decided to change the name to "Sagamore Hill". Sagamore is the Algonquin word for chieftain, the head of the tribe.

In 1905, Roosevelt expanded the house, adding the largest room, called the "North Room" to a design by C. Grant LaFarge (40 by 30 feet (12.2 by 9.1 m)), for $19,000 (equal to $680,833 today). The North Room is furnished with trophies from the former president's hunts and gifts from foreign dignitaries, alongside pieces of art and books from the Roosevelts' collection. The home then had 23 rooms, including a water closet with a porcelain tub, which was a luxury at the time of its construction.

The house and its surrounding farmland became the primary residence of Theodore and Edith Roosevelt for the rest of their lives and the birthplace of three of their five children (Theodore Jr., Kermit and Ethel). Sagamore Hill took on its greatest importance when it became known as the "Summer White House" during the seven summers (1902–1908) that Roosevelt spent there as President. It played host to numerous visits from foreign dignitaries and peace talks that helped draw an end to the Russo-Japanese War. Roosevelt died at Sagamore Hill on January 6, 1919, and he was buried at nearby Youngs Memorial Cemetery.

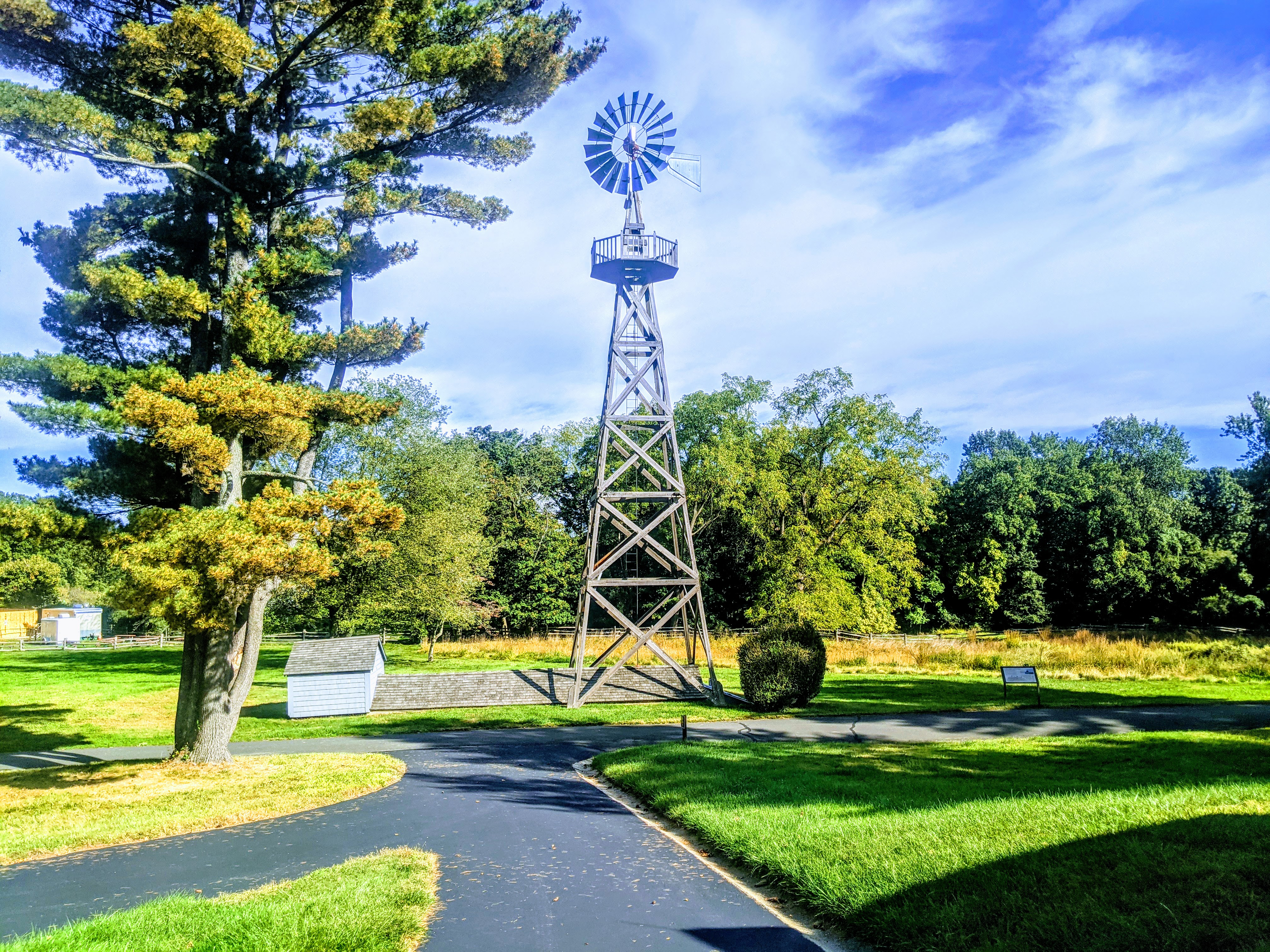
The windmill at Sagamore Hill

On July 25, 1962, Congress established Sagamore Hill National Historic Site to preserve the house as a unit of the National Park Service. As with all historic areas administered by the National Park Service, Sagamore Hill was listed on the National Register of Historic Places on October 15, 1966.

The interior of the home is viewable by ticketed tour and almost all of the furnishings are original. The grounds are open to the public and admission is free. Also on the site is the Theodore Roosevelt Museum, which chronicles the life and career of the President. The museum is housed in the 1938 house called "Old Orchard", the former residence of Brigadier General Theodore Roosevelt Jr. and his family which was designed by William G. McMillan, Jr. Sagamore Hill was closed for about 4 years (from 2011 to 2015) to allow for restoration work to take place. The Sagamore Hill visitor center was destroyed by a fire on Christmas Eve 2018; no one was injured, as Sagamore Hill was closed due to the government shutdown.

== In popular culture ==
Asteroid 218679 Sagamorehill, discovered by Richard Kowalski in 2005, was named for the home of former US President Theodore Roosevelt. The official naming citation was published by the Minor Planet Center on January 9, 2020 (M.P.C. 120069).

== See also ==
- List of residences of presidents of the United States
- Presidential memorials in the United States
