= Oyster Bay (hamlet), New York =

Oyster Bay, New York
- Hamlet and census-designated place Town Seat of Oyster Bay
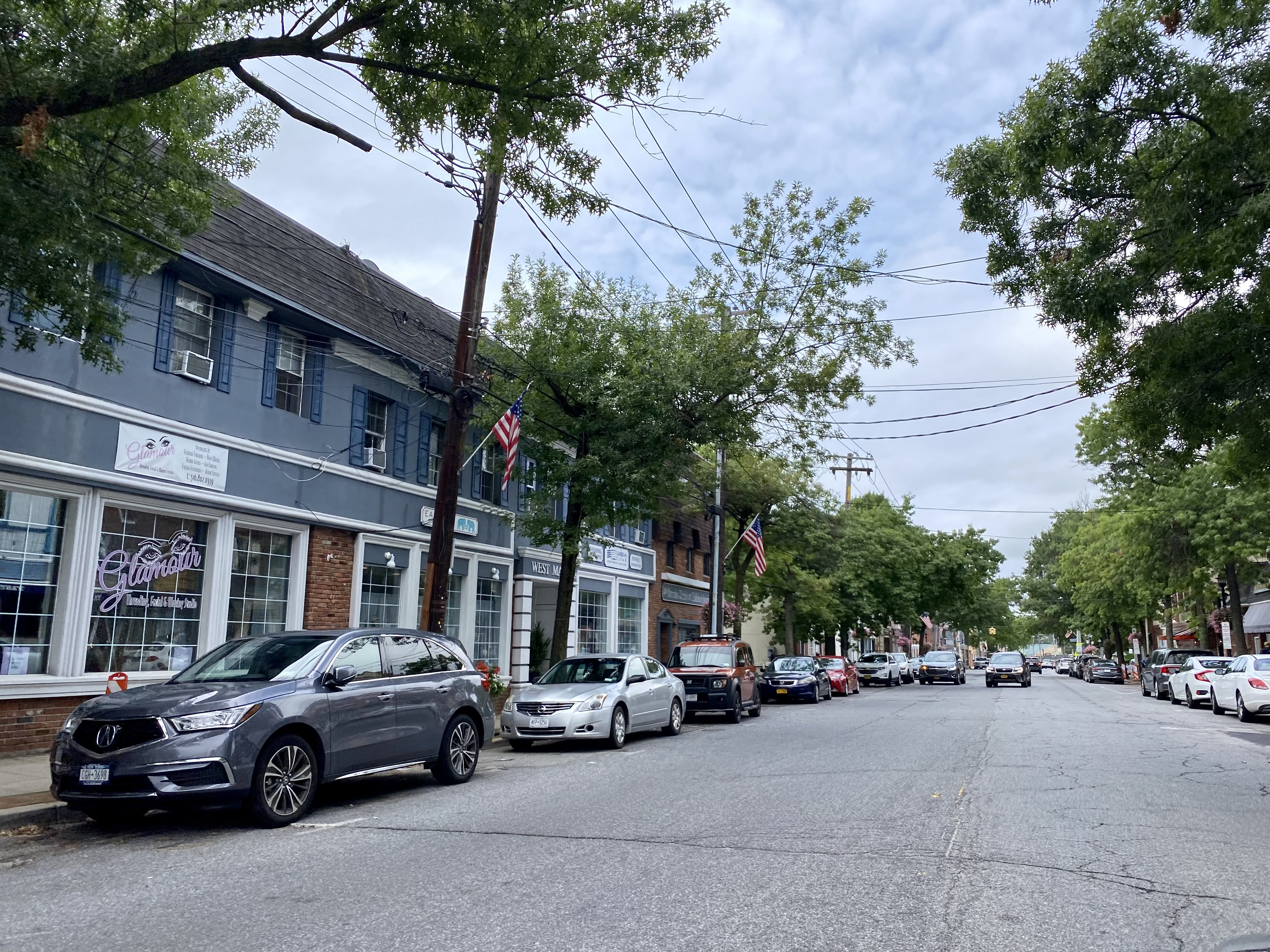
- Downtown Oyster Bay in 2021

- Location in Nassau County and the state of New York

- Location on Long Island Location within the state of New York
- Coordinates: 40°52′20.8″N 73°31′50.8″W
- Country: United States
- State: New York
- County: Nassau
- Town: Oyster Bay
- First settled: 1666

Area
  - Total: 1.61 sq mi (4.16 km^{2})
  - Land: 1.24 sq mi (3.20 km^{2})
  - Water: 0.37 sq mi (0.96 km^{2})
- Elevation: 180 ft (55 m)

Population (2020)
  - Total: 7,049
  - Density: 5,698.6/sq mi (2,200.23/km^{2})
- Time zone: UTC-5 (Eastern (EST))
  - Summer (DST): UTC-4 (EDT)
- ZIP Codes: 11771 (Oyster Bay); 11732 (East Norwich)
- Area codes: 516, 363
- FIPS code: 36-55992
- NWS SAME code: 036059

Oyster Bay is a hamlet and census-designated place (CDP) within – and the Town Seat of – the Town of Oyster Bay, in Nassau County, on the North Shore of Long Island, in New York, United States. The population was 7,049 at the time of the 2020 census.

The hamlet's area was considerably larger before several of its parts incorporated as separate villages. At least six of the 36 villages and hamlets of the Town of Oyster Bay have shores on Oyster Bay Harbor and its inlets, and many of these were previously considered part of the hamlet of Oyster Bay; three of those are now known as Mill Neck, Bayville, and Centre Island. The Oyster Bay Post Office (ZIP code 11771) serves portions of the surrounding villages also, including Oyster Bay Cove, Laurel Hollow, Mill Neck, Muttontown, Centre Island, Cove Neck, and Upper Brookville.

== History ==
The first mention of Oyster Bay comes from Dutch Captain David Pietersz. de Vries, who in his journal recalls how on June 4, 1639, he "came to anchor in Oyster Bay, which is a large bay which lies on the north side of the Great Island… There are fine oysters here, whence our nation has given it the name of Oyster Bay."

Oyster Bay was settled by the Dutch, and was the boundary between the Dutch New Amsterdam colony and the English New England colonies. The English, under Peter Wright, first settled in the area in 1653. The boundary between the Dutch and English was somewhat fluid which led to each group having their own Main Street. Many Quakers came to Oyster Bay, escaping persecution from Dutch authorities in New Amsterdam. These included Elizabeth Feake and her husband Captain John Underhill, whom she converted to Quakerism.

Other notable Quakers to settle in Oyster Bay were the brothers John Townsend and Henry Townsend. Noted dissenter and founder of Quakerism George Fox visited Oyster Bay in 1672, where he spoke with the Wrights, Underhill and Feake at a Quaker gathering on the site of Council Rock, facing the Mill Pond.

During the Revolutionary War, Raynham Hall was owned by the Townsend family. For a six-month period from 1778 to 1779, the Townsend home served as British headquarters for the Queen's Rangers led by Lt. Col. John Graves Simcoe. Simcoe was often visited by British officer Major John Andre. According to legend, on one of these visits Samuel Townsend's daughter Sally Townsend overheard the two officers discussing Benedict Arnold's traitorous plot to surrender the fort at West Point to the British. The plot was thwarted when three Americans on patrol captured Andre near West Point, preventing what would have been a disastrous defeat for the colonists in the Revolutionary War.

In the 1880s, the Long Island Rail Road (LIRR) extended rail service from Locust Valley as a means to establish a connection between New York and Boston, via steamboat on Long Island Sound. On June 21, 1889, the first LIRR train arrived in Oyster Bay. In the following year, service commenced with the train coaches being loaded onto a ferry for a connection to the New Haven Railroad at Norwalk, CT. Service lasted less than a year.

Around the time railroad service was introduced, Theodore Roosevelt, the future 26th President of the United States, chose to make his home at Sagamore Hill, in present-day Cove Neck, a neighboring incorporated village (Cove Neck was not incorporated until 1927). Sagamore Hill was completed in 1886. This is where Roosevelt lived until his death in 1919. His wife Edith Roosevelt continued to occupy the house until her death, nearly three decades later, in September 1948. On July 25, 1962, Congress established the Sagamore Hill National Historic Site to preserve the house.

Efforts to honor Theodore Roosevelt in Oyster Bay have greatly improved the hamlet. These include design of the Theodore Roosevelt Memorial Park. Other Roosevelt-related landmarks have been restored including Snouder's Drug Store – location of the first telegraph in Oyster Bay, Moore's Building – today the Wild Honey restaurant, and proposals to restore the Oyster Bay Long Island Rail Road Station – home station of TR and the Octagon Hotel – built in 1851 and once home to offices of Governor Roosevelt. A local non-profit, the Oyster Bay Main Street Association, developed an audio tour of these historic sites and many others called the Oyster Bay History Walk.

The oysters that give the bay its name are now the only source of traditionally farmed oysters from Long Island, providing up to 90% of all the oysters harvested in New York State.

When Hurricane Sandy hit Oyster Bay in 2012, West Shore Road was demolished. Due to the damages, commuters between Bayville and Oyster Bay had to take a detour through Mill Neck, on-and-off for four years, while the road was rebuilt.

== Geography ==
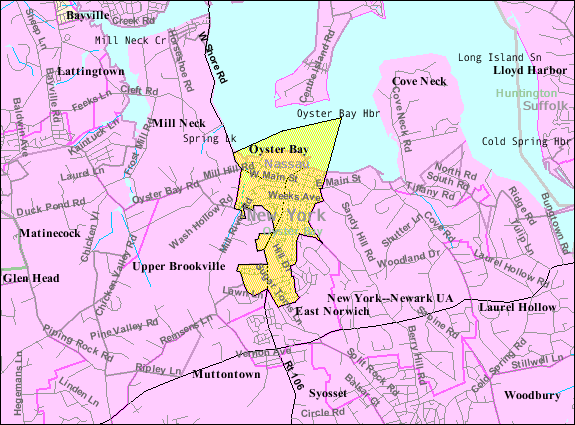
U.S. Census map of Oyster Bay

According to the United States Census Bureau, the CDP has a total area of 1.6 square miles (4.1 km^{2}), of which 1.2 square miles (3.1 km^{2}) is land and 0.4 square miles (1.0 km^{2}) – or 23.60% – is water.

For the 2000 census, the CDP was enlarged beyond the boundaries used for the 1990 census.

=== Greater Oyster Bay Area ===
The Greater Oyster Bay area consists of 12 villages and three unincorporated hamlets:

- Oyster Bay
- Centre Island
- Bayville
- Oyster Bay Cove
- Cove Neck
- East Norwich
- Mill Neck
- Locust Valley
- Matinecock
- Lattingtown

Note: Locust Valley, Matinecock, Lattingtown are also in the Greater Glen Cove area.

== Demographics ==
Historical population
Census	Pop.	Note	%±
2000	6,826		—
2010	6,707		−1.7%
2020	7,049		5.1%
U.S. Decennial Census

=== 2010 Census ===
As of the 2010 Census the population was 85% White 7.6% Non-Hispanic White, 3.3% Black or African American, 0.3% Native American, 2.9% Asian, 0.0% Pacific Islander, 5.4% from other races, and 3% from two or more races. Hispanic or Latino of any race were 16.7% of the population.

=== 2000 Census ===
As of the census of 2000, there were 6,826 people, 2,815 households, and 1,731 families residing in the CDP. The population density was 5,554.1 inhabitants per square mile (2,144.4/km^{2}). There were 2,898 housing units at an average density of 2,358.0 per square mile (910.4/km^{2}). The racial makeup of the CDP was 90.51% White, 3.16% Black or African American, 0.28% Native American, 1.76% Asian, 0.03% Pacific Islander, 2.17% from other races, and 2.09% from two or more races. Hispanic or Latino of any race were 12.25% of the population.

There were 2,815 households, out of which 26.0% had children under the age of 18 living with them, 48.3% were married couples living together, 9.7% had a female householder with no husband present, and 38.5% were non-families. 33.1% of all households were made up of individuals, and 13.4% had someone living alone who was 65 years of age or older. The average household size was 2.39 and the average family size was 3.06.

In the CDP, the population was spread out, with 20.7% under the age of 18, 6.4% from 18 to 24, 32.3% from 25 to 44, 23.8% from 45 to 64, and 16.8% who were 65 years of age or older. The median age was 40 years. For every 100 females, there were 92.3 males. For every 100 females age 18 and over, there were 89.3 males.

The median income for a household in the CDP was $57,993, and the median income for a family was $73,500. Males had a median income of $51,968 versus $41,926 for females. The per capita income for the CDP was $34,730. About 3.3% of families and 7.8% of the population were below the poverty line, including 5.5% of those under age 18 and 12.1% of those age 65 or over.

== Economy ==
Acclaim Entertainment was originally located in the hamlet of Oyster Bay. It originally occupied a one-room office in Oyster Bay. At a later time it occupied a brick structure with two stories. In 1994 Acclaim bought a headquarters building in Glen Cove.

== Education ==
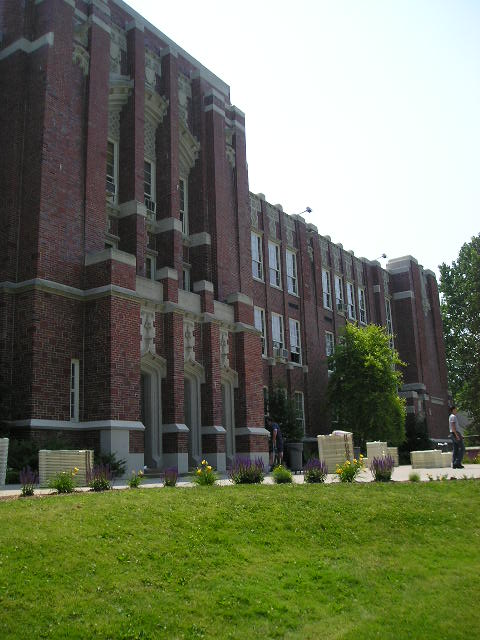
Oyster Bay High School

=== Public schools ===
Oyster Bay is served by the Oyster Bay-East Norwich Central School District. Schools in the district include:

- Oyster Bay High School, within the hamlet, is the sole public high school.
- James H. Vernon School
- Theodore Roosevelt Elementary School

=== Private school ===
- St. Dominic High School

== Library ==
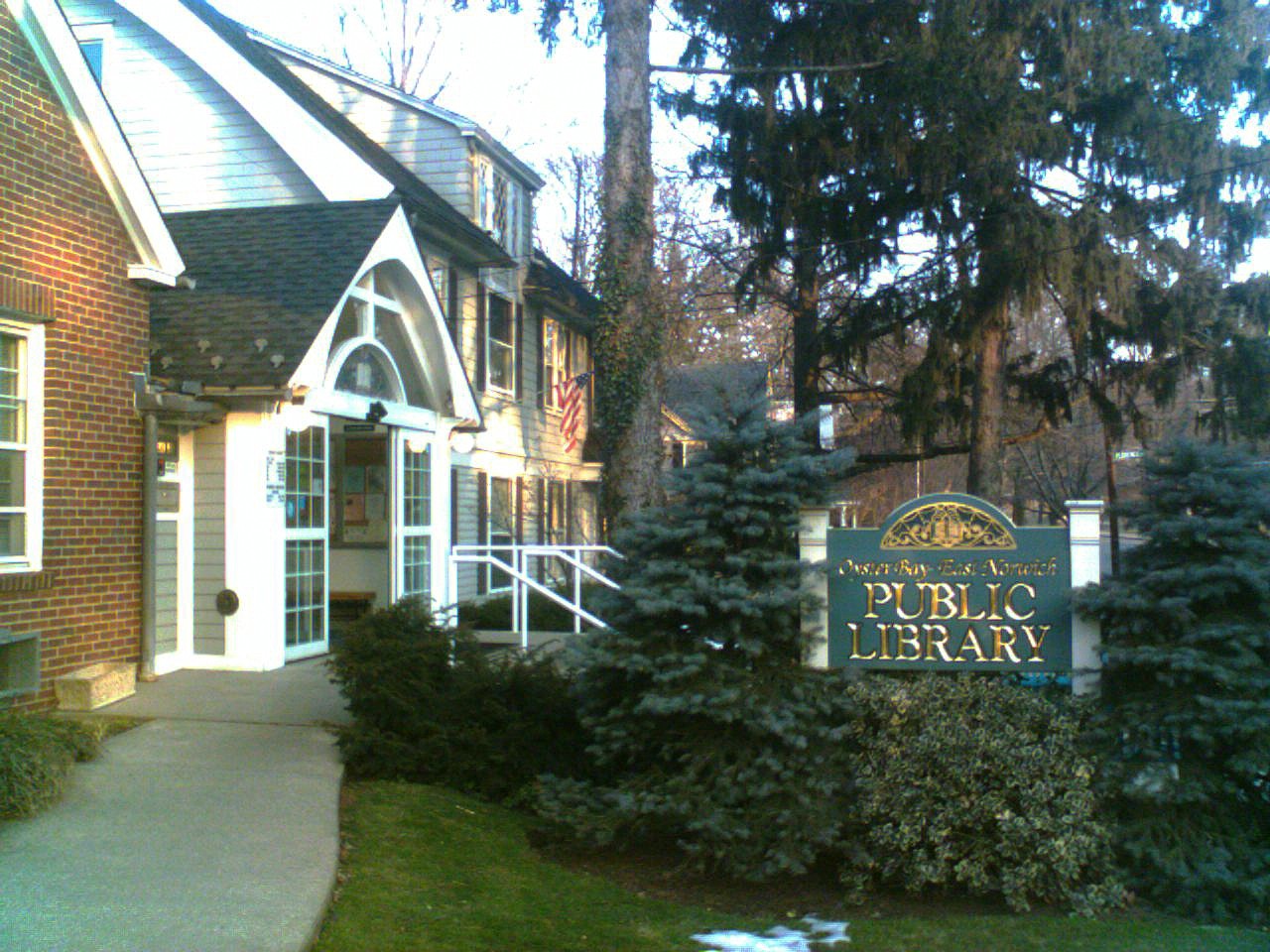
Oyster Bay - East Norwich Public Library

The Oyster Bay-East Norwich Public Library is a public library serving the residents of the communities of Oyster Bay and East Norwich. Today the library provides a variety of services for youth and adults.

=== History ===
For over two hundred years the residents of Oyster Bay did not have a public library as we know it today. Before the turn of the twentieth century there were "reading rooms" instead. One of the earliest was opened by the Daughters of the American Revolution in 1873, called the Oyster Bay Reading Room and Lyceum, with a focus on history and genealogy.

Others included one run by Christ Church, begun in 1889 by Reverend Henry Homer Washburn, to encourage people to spend less time at saloons. He gave up on the idea when his reading room was used more for card playing than reading.

Then in 1893 the People's Library and Reading Room opened on east Main Street and it is that collection of books which would later be brought to this building.

The Oyster Bay-East Norwich Public Library was originally constructed in 1901, through the efforts and donations of many community leaders, notably Andrew Snouder of Snouder's Drug Store. One of the early fundraising efforts was the laying of a cornerstone by Theodore Roosevelt in 1899, when the land had been donated by Mrs. Harriet Swan, but no plans for the building itself had yet been developed. In the time between the laying of that cornerstone, and the construction of the actual building, the symbolic masonry corner was lost and has still never been found.

Another early contributor was Andrew Carnegie, the industrialist and philanthropist. He had a niece who lived near the village and when he heard of the efforts to begin a library here he donated $1,000 to help the cause. Carnegie continued this thousand dollar annual contribution for many years afterwards, which helped greatly during the early years of the library's history. The brick building to the left as you face the front of the library represents the original structure, which was wood frame until 1949, when an extensive renovation took place.

To the right is a frame house built around 1890 which for many generations was a doctor's office. It was purchased by the library and connected to the original building in 1975. This house is often referred to as the Bishop house, named for Dr. Bishop who had a medical practice there. In 1994 the brick and glass additions behind the Bishop House were added on to further expand the facilities which now include a spacious and sunny children's room.

== Landmarks ==
- Raynham Hall Museum, home of the Samuel Townsend family and a British headquarters during the American Revolution. Townsend's son, Robert, was a member of the Culper Spy Ring.
- The WaterFront Center a non-profit center for marine education and recreation offering sailing lessons and environmental education programs. It also owns the Sloop Christeen which it uses for sails around the harbor.
- Beekman Beach
- Sagamore Rowing Association
- Oyster Bay Railroad Museum dedicated to preserving the rich legacy of Long Island's railroad history.

== Notable people ==
Oyster Bay is known for the residence and summer White House of Theodore Roosevelt, Sagamore Hill (though that residence is in a nearby area known since 1927 as the Village of Cove Neck).

Many well-known American celebrities spent their youth in this town. Among its better known former residents are musician Billy Joel, who mentions the town in his song "The Ballad of Billy the Kid"; tennis players John McEnroe and his brother Patrick; actress Heather Matarazzo; authors Thomas Pynchon and Tracy Kidder; basketball coach Rick Pitino of Bayville, who attended St. Dominic's School; composer John Barry; and Sonic Youth guitarist Lee Ranaldo (Pynchon and Ranaldo attended Oyster Bay High School).

A less distinguished figure from the hamlet's past is Typhoid Mary, whose contagiousness was discovered following an investigation into her employment at a summer home in Oyster Bay in 1906. William Woodward Jr., accidental victim of 1955's "Shooting of the Century" and subject of Dominic Dunne's book and NBC's The Two Mrs. Grenvilles was also a resident of Oyster Bay.

It was also the setting of the 2000 film Meet the Parents.

== See also ==
- Oyster Bay History Walk
- List of Town of Oyster Bay Landmarks
- National Register of Historic Places listings in Nassau County, New York
