= George B. Swan House =

Historic house in Iowa, United States

- U.S. National Register of Historic Places
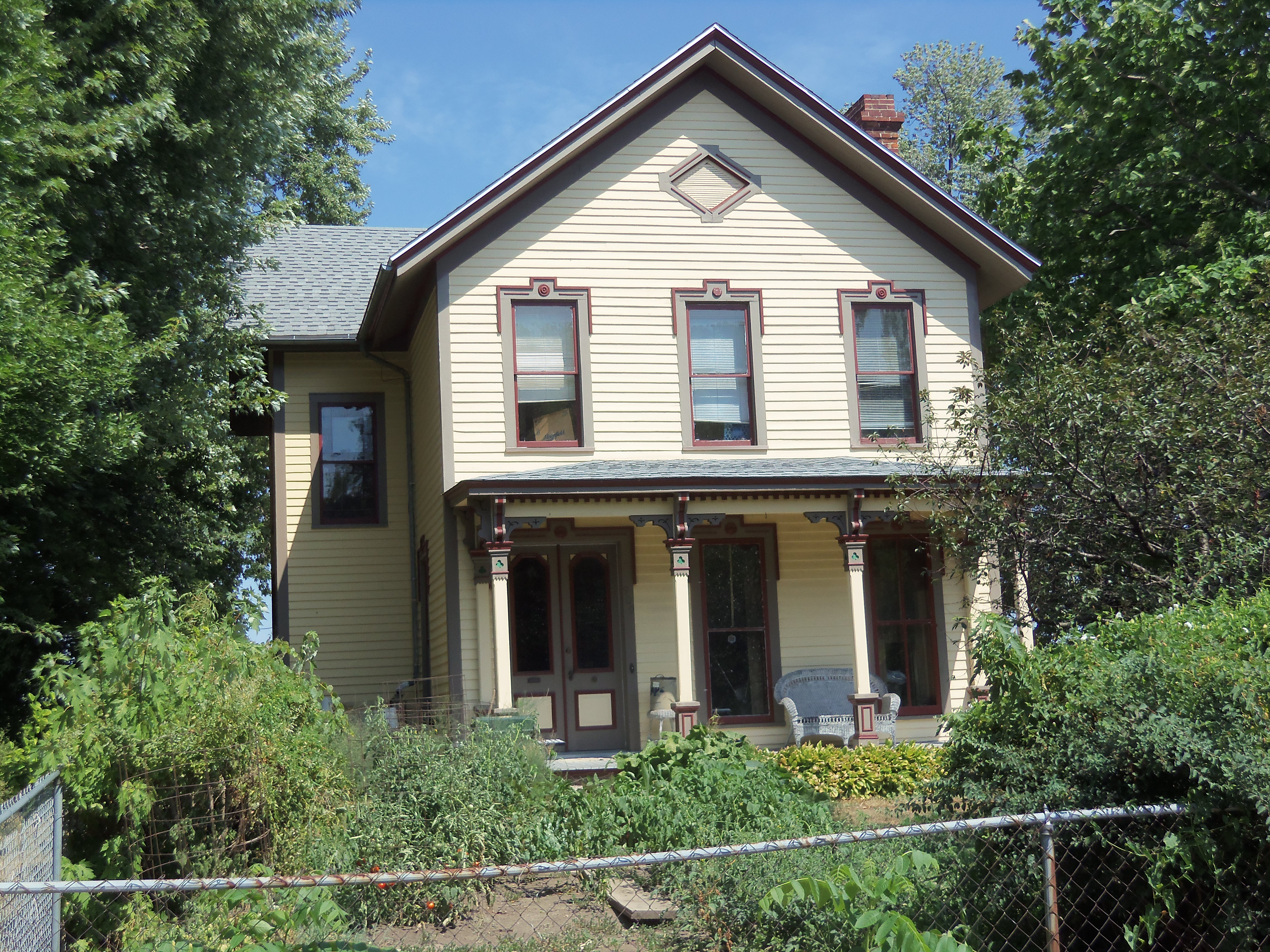

- Location within Iowa Location within the United States
- Location: 909 Farnam St. Davenport, Iowa
- Coordinates: 41°31′44″N 90°33′59″W
- Area: less than one acre
- Built: 1881
- Architectural style: Greek Revival
- MPS: Davenport MRA
- NRHP reference No.: 83002514
- Added to NRHP: July 7, 1983

The George B. Swan House is a historic building located on the east side of Davenport, Iowa, United States. It has been listed on the National Register of Historic Places since 1983.

== History ==
George B. Swan was the yardmaster for the Chicago, Rock Island and Pacific Railroad. Their roundhouse and switching yards were located down Farnam Street from his house. He had this house constructed in 1881 when the lot was subdivided from the LeClaire family's homestead.

== Architecture ==
The house is a two-story Greek Revival structure with a three-bay front and a front gable. Decorative features such as chamfered posts with small brackets, decorative window surrounds, a diamond-shaped window in the gable end and a two-story projecting side bay make this a Vernacular idiom of the style. A double-leaf door serves as the main entrance into the house.
