= Youngs Memorial Cemetery =

Small cemetery in Oyster Bay Cove, New York

- Interactive map of Youngs Memorial Cemetery

Details
- Established: 1900; 126 years ago
- Location: Oyster Bay Cove, New York
- Country: United States
- Coordinates: 40°52′13″N 73°30′23″W
- Find a Grave: Youngs Memorial Cemetery

Youngs Memorial Cemetery is a small cemetery in the village of Oyster Bay Cove, New York in the United States of America. It is located approximately one and a half miles south of Sagamore Hill National Historic Site. The cemetery was chartered in 1900 and was located on land owned by the Youngs family.

== Background ==
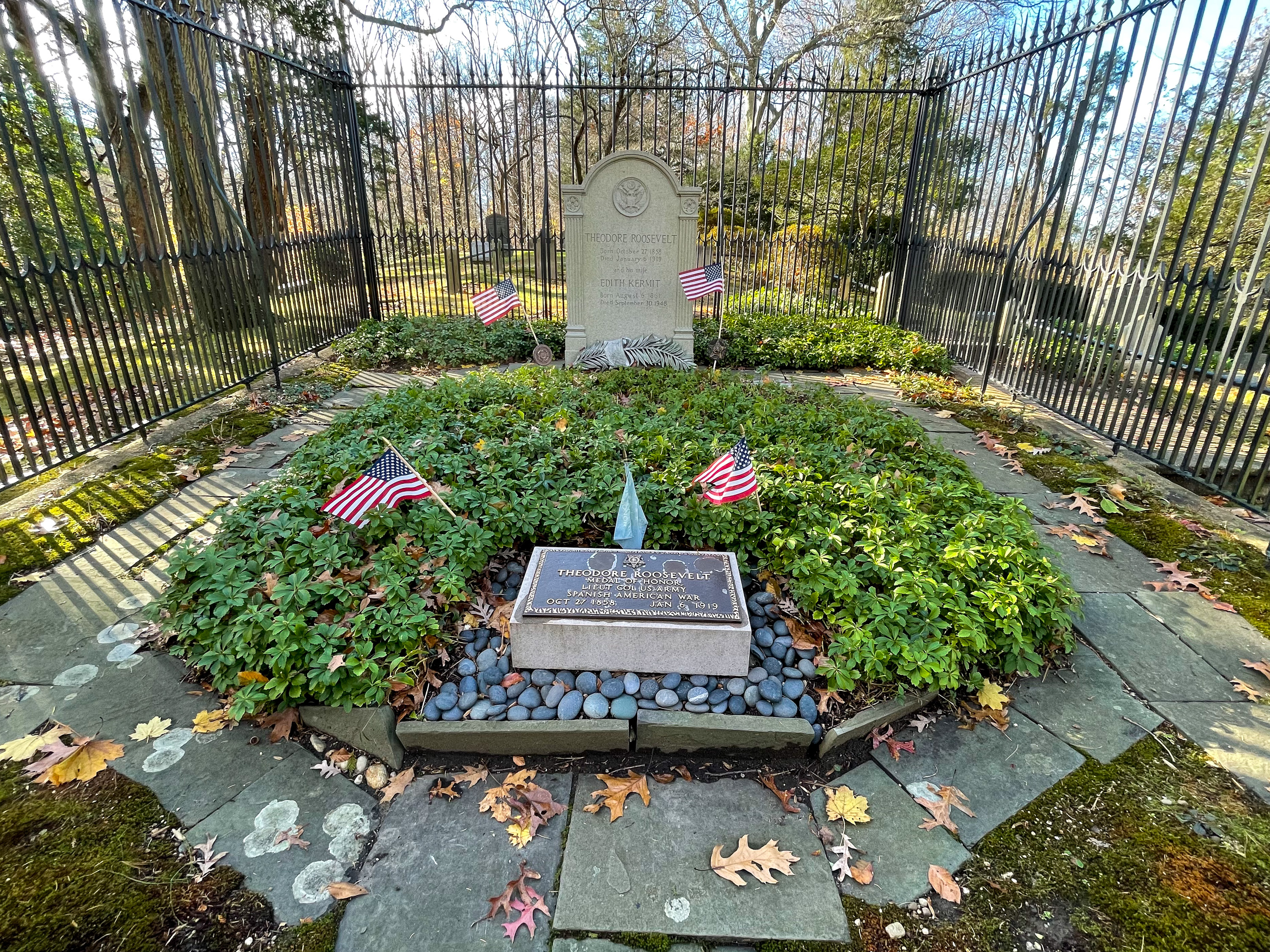
Theodore and Edith Roosevelt's grave at Youngs Memorial Cemetery

Theodore Roosevelt, the twenty-sixth President of the United States, and his wife Edith Roosevelt are buried at Youngs.

== See also ==
- Oyster Bay History Walk
- List of burial places of presidents and vice presidents of the United States
- List of Town of Oyster Bay Landmarks
- National Register of Historic Places listings in Nassau County, New York
