= Centre Island, New York =

- Village
- Incorporated Village of Centre Island
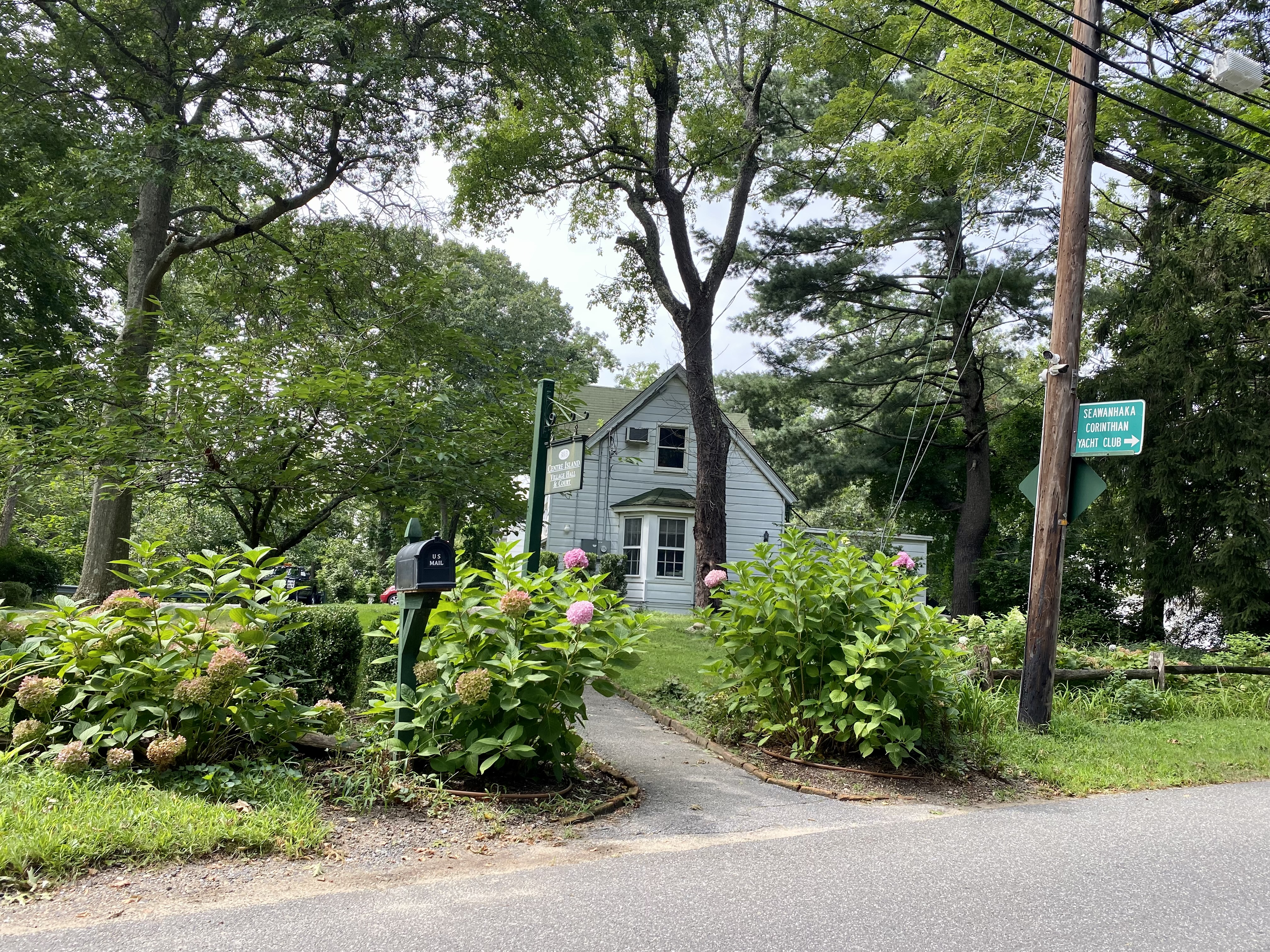
- Centre Island Village Hall in 2021

- Location in Nassau County and the state of New York

- Location on Long Island Location within the state of New York
- Coordinates: 40°54′27″N 73°30′57″W
- Country: United States
- State: New York
- County: Nassau
- town: Oyster Bay
- First settled: 1683
- Incorporated: 1926

Area
  - Total: 1.09 sq mi (2.83 km^{2})
  - Land: 1.09 sq mi (2.82 km^{2})
  - Water: 0 sq mi (0.00 km^{2})
- Elevation: 33 ft (10 m)

Population (2020)
  - Total: 407
  - Density: 373.3/sq mi (144.15/km^{2})
- Time zone: UTC-5 (Eastern (EST))
  - Summer (DST): UTC-4 (EDT)
- ZIP Code: 11771 (Oyster Bay)
- Area codes: 516, 363
- FIPS code: 36-13618
- GNIS feature ID: 0946329
- Website: centreisland.org

Centre Island is an upscale residential village located within the Town of Oyster Bay in Nassau County, on the North Shore of Long Island, in New York, United States. It is home to many high profile figures in politics, advertising, media, finance, and entertainment. Its population was 407 at the time of the 2020 census.

== History ==
The location of what is now the Village of Centre Island was originally inhabited by Matinecock Native Americans. In 1683 European colonists began to settle the area.

Centre Island incorporated as a village in 1926.

== Geography ==
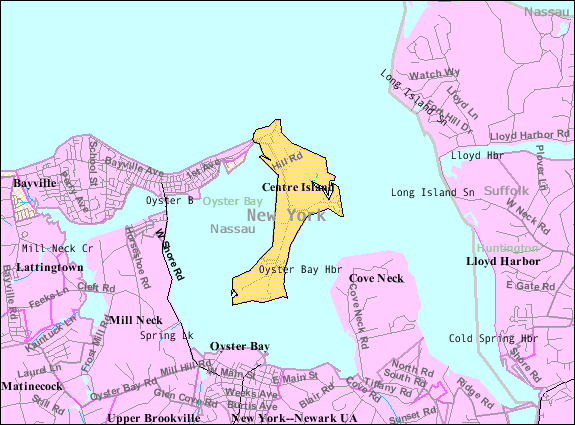
U.S. Census map of Centre Island

According to the United States Census Bureau, the village has a total area of 1.1 square miles (2.8 km^{2}), all land.

Despite its name, it is actually a peninsula in modern times.

== Demographics ==
Historical population
Census	Pop.	Note	%±
1930	139		—
1940	134		−3.6%
1950	199		48.5%
1960	270		35.7%
1970	374		38.5%
1980	378		1.1%
1990	439		16.1%
2000	444		1.1%
2010	410		−7.7%
2020	407		−0.7%
U.S. Decennial Census

=== Racial and ethnic composition ===
Centre Island village, New York – Racial and ethnic composition Note: the US Census treats Hispanic/Latino as an ethnic category. This table excludes Latinos from the racial categories and assigns them to a separate category. Hispanics/Latinos may be of any race.
Race / Ethnicity (NH = Non-Hispanic)	Pop 2000	Pop 2010	Pop 2020	% 2000	% 2010	% 2020
White alone (NH)	421	362	351	94.82%	88.29%	86.24%
Black or African American alone (NH)	2	0	2	0.45%	0.00%	0.49%
Native American or Alaska Native alone (NH)	0	0	0	0.00%	0.00%	0.00%
Asian alone (NH)	4	15	19	0.90%	3.66%	4.67%
Native Hawaiian or Pacific Islander alone (NH)	0	0	1	0.00%	0.00%	0.25%
Other race alone (NH)	0	3	0	0.00%	0.73%	0.00%
Mixed race or Multiracial (NH)	3	0	3	0.68%	0.00%	0.74%
Hispanic or Latino (any race)	14	30	31	3.15%	7.32%	7.62%
Total	444	410	407	100.00%	100.00%	100.00%

=== 2000 census ===
As of the census of 2000, there were 444 people, 174 households, and 128 families residing in the village. The population density was 397.2 inhabitants per square mile (153.4/km^{2}). There were 209 housing units at an average density of 187.0 per square mile (72.2/km^{2}). The racial makeup of the village was 96.62% White, 0.45% African American, 0.90% Asian, 0.45% from other races, and 1.58% from two or more races. Hispanic or Latino of any race were 3.15% of the population.

There were 174 households, out of which 29.9% had children under the age of 18 living with them, 63.2% were married couples living together, 6.9% had a female householder with no husband present, and 25.9% were non-families. 19.5% of all households were made up of individuals, and 6.3% had someone living alone who was 65 years of age or older. The average household size was 2.55 and the average family size was 2.93.

In the village, the population was spread out, with 20.9% under the age of 18, 3.8% from 18 to 24, 27.7% from 25 to 44, 31.1% from 45 to 64, and 16.4% who were 65 years of age or older. The median age was 43 years. For every 100 females, there were 98.2 males. For every 100 females age 18 and over, there were 105.3 males.

The median income for a household in the village was $117,848, and the median income for a family was $115,972. Males had a median income of $100,000 versus $40,000 for females. The per capita income for the village was $96,674. About 6.0% of families and 12.6% of the population were below the poverty line, including 32.5% of those under age 18 and 5.9% of those age 65 or over.

== Government ==
As of August 2021, the Mayor of Centre Island is Michael Chalos and the Village Trustees are Robert Broussard, Grace Haggerty, and the Hon. Victor Ort.

== Education ==
=== School district ===
The Village of Centre Island is located entirely within the boundaries of the Oyster Bay–East Norwich Central School District.

As such, all children who reside within Centre Island and attend public schools go to Oyster Bay–East Norwich's schools.

=== Library district ===
Centre Island is located within the boundaries of the Oyster Bay–East Norwich Library District.

== Landmarks ==
The National Register-listed Sewanhaka Corinthian Yacht Club is located within the village.

== Notable people ==
- John Barry, film composer.
- George M. Fletcher: Member of the New York State Assembly
- Sean Hannity: Radio host, television host, political commentator, and author.
- Billy Joel: American singer-songwriter, composer, and pianist.
- Alan Jay Lerner: Academy and Tony Award-winning lyricist.
- Rupert Murdoch: Media mogul who founded NewsCorp.
- Rosalind P. Walter: American philanthropist known for her support of PBS programs.

== See also ==
- List of municipalities in New York
- Middle Island, New York
