= Cove Neck, New York =

- Village
- Incorporated Village of Cove Neck
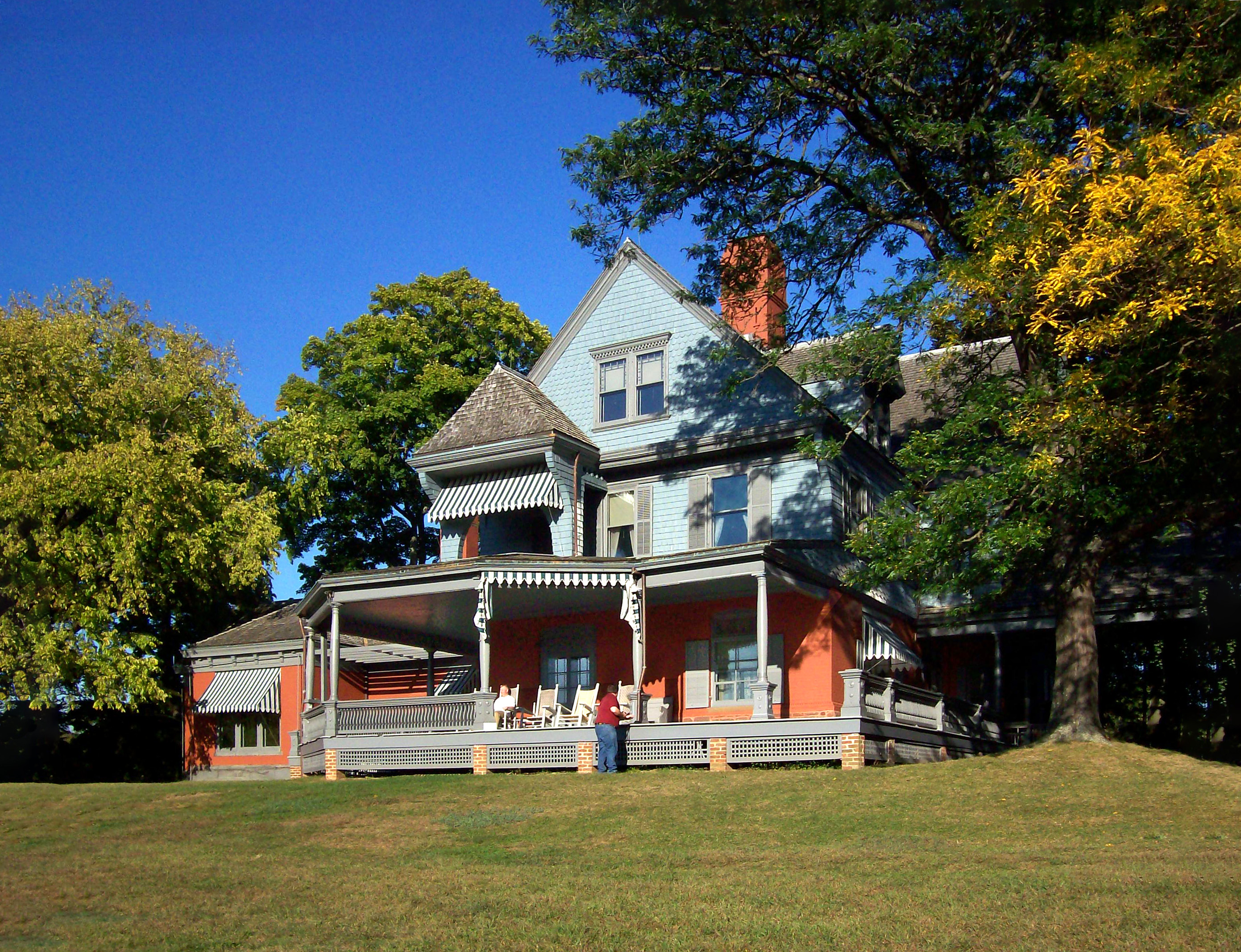
- Sagamore Hill, Cove Neck's best-known landmark, September 2007

- logo

- Location in Nassau County and the state of New York.

- Location on Long Island Location within the state of New York
- Coordinates: 40°52′40″N 73°29′50″W
- Country: United States
- State: New York
- County: Nassau
- Town: Oyster Bay
- Incorporated: 1927

Government
  - Mayor: Thomas R. Zoller

Area
  - Total: 1.56 sq mi (4.05 km^{2})
  - Land: 1.29 sq mi (3.33 km^{2})
  - Water: 0.28 sq mi (0.72 km^{2})
- Elevation: 23 ft (7 m)

Population (2020)
  - Total: 293
  - Density: 228/sq mi (88.1/km^{2})
- Time zone: UTC-5 (Eastern (EST))
  - Summer (DST): UTC-4 (EDT)
- ZIP Code: 11771 (Oyster Bay)
- Area codes: 516, 363
- FIPS code: 36-18597
- GNIS feature ID: 0947571
- Website: www.coveneck.org

Cove Neck is a village located within the Town of Oyster Bay in Nassau County, on the North Shore of Long Island, in New York. As of the 2020 census, Cove Neck had a population of 293.

== History ==
Cove Neck incorporated as a village in 1927.

Cove Neck is the site of the home of President Theodore Roosevelt. His estate, Sagamore Hill, is now a museum operated by the National Park Service. It attracts many visitors annually.

On January 25, 1990, Avianca Flight 052, which was operated by one of the airline's Boeing 707 jetliners, ran out of fuel before crashing into a hillside in Cove Neck. 73 out of the 158 passengers and crew on board died in the accident.

== Geography ==
According to the United States Census Bureau, the village has a total area of 1.6 square miles (4.1 km^{2}), of which 1.3 square miles (3.4 km^{2}) is land and 0.3 square miles (0.78 km^{2}), or 18.47%, is water.

The village is located on a peninsula projecting into Oyster Bay. It is located directly across from Centre Island.

== Demographics ==
Historical population
| Census | Pop. | Note | %± |
|---|---|---|---|
| 1930 | 276 | | — |
| 1940 | 130 | | −52.9% |
| 1950 | 200 | | 53.8% |
| 1960 | 299 | | 49.5% |
| 1970 | 344 | | 15.1% |
| 1980 | 331 | | −3.8% |
| 1990 | 332 | | 0.3% |
| 2000 | 300 | | −9.6% |
| 2010 | 286 | | −4.7% |
| 2020 | 293 | | 2.4% |
U.S. Decennial Census

=== Racial and ethnic composition ===
Cove Neck village, New York – Racial and ethnic composition Note: the US Census treats Hispanic/Latino as an ethnic category. This table excludes Latinos from the racial categories and assigns them to a separate category. Hispanics/Latinos may be of any race.
| Race / Ethnicity (NH = Non-Hispanic) | Pop 2000 | Pop 2010 | Pop 2020 | % 2000 | % 2010 | % 2020 |
|---|---|---|---|---|---|---|
| White alone (NH) | 275 | 264 | 264 | 91.67% | 92.31% | 90.10% |
| Black or African American alone (NH) | 0 | 1 | 0 | 0.00% | 0.35% | 0.00% |
| Native American or Alaska Native alone (NH) | 0 | 0 | 1 | 0.00% | 0.00% | 0.34% |
| Asian alone (NH) | 12 | 4 | 0 | 4.00% | 1.40% | 0.00% |
| Native Hawaiian or Pacific Islander alone (NH) | 0 | 0 | 0 | 0.00% | 0.00% | 0.00% |
| Other race alone (NH) | 0 | 0 | 1 | 0.00% | 0.00% | 0.34% |
| Mixed race or Multiracial (NH) | 0 | 3 | 9 | 0.00% | 1.05% | 3.07% |
| Hispanic or Latino (any race) | 13 | 14 | 18 | 4.33% | 4.90% | 6.14% |
| Total | 300 | 286 | 293 | 100.00% | 100.00% | 100.00% |

=== 2020 Census ===
As of the census of 2020, there were 293 people, 101 households, and 72 families in the village. The racial makeup of the village is 90.44% White, 0.68% American Indian or Alaska Native, 0.34% were of some other race alone, and 8.53% were of two races alone. Of those who were of two races alone, 1.02% were mixed White and Asian, 0.68% were mixed White and American Indian or Alaska Native, 0.34% were mixed White and Black, and 6.48% were mixed White and some other race.

=== 2000 Census ===
As of the census of 2000, there were 300 people, 110 households, and 83 families in the village. The population density was 233.4 inhabitants per square mile (90.1/km^{2}). Cove Neck is the least densely populated community in Nassau County. There were 140 housing units at an average density of 108.9 per square mile (42.0/km^{2}). es living together, 7.3% had a female householder with no husband present, and 24.5% were non-families. 19.1% of households were one person and 11.8% were one person aged 65 or older. The average household size was 2.73 and the average family size was 3.16.

The age distribution was 26.3% under the age of 18, 4.7% from 18 to 24, 20.3% from 25 to 44, 29.3% from 45 to 64, and 19.3% 65 or older. The median age was 44 years. For every 100 females, there were 96.1 males. For every 100 females age 18 and over, there were 87.3 males.

== Government ==
As of December 2021, the Mayor of Cove Neck is Thomas R. Zoller and the Village Trustees are Joseph Castellana, Marjorie Isaksen, and Marta Kelly.

=== Politics ===
In the 2016 U.S. presidential election, the majority of Cove Neck voters voted for Hillary Clinton (D).

== Education ==
The entirety of Cove Neck is located within the boundaries of (and is thus served by) the Oyster Bay-East Norwich Central School District. As such, all children who reside within the village and attend public schools go to Oyster Bay–East Norwich's schools.

== Notable people ==
- Charles Dolan – Businessman; founder of Cablevision and HBO.
- John McEnroe – Tennis player.
- Theodore Roosevelt – 26th President of the United States.
- Charles Wang – Businessman and former owner of the New York Islanders.
