= List of New York State Historic Markers in Nassau County, New York =

This is intended to be a complete list of New York State Historic Markers in Nassau County, New York.

== Listings county-wide ==
=== Town of Hempstead ===
	Marker name	Image	Date designated	Location	City or Town	Marker text
1	1666 JACKSON—JONES 1935			MERRICK RD. E. OF RIVERSIDE DR.	Wantagh	HOME OF COL. JOHN JACKSON BRIG. GEN. JACOB S. JACKSON SAMUEL JACKSON JONES (1923) AND THEIR DESCENDANTS FOR TEN GENERATIONS
2	BENJAMIN F. THOMPSON			FULTON AVE., W. OF TERRACE AVE.	Hempstead	1784–1849, WROTE "HISTORY OF LONG ISLAND" WHILE LIVING HERE. HIS GRAVE IS IN HEMPSTEAD.
3	CAMP MEETING GROUNDS			Fletcher Avenue and Haven Avenue	North Merrick	ANNUAL METHODIST CAMP MEETINGS WERE HELD NORTH OF THIS MARKER FROM 1869 TO THE EARLY 1920'S. Historical Society of the Merricks
4	CHERRYWOOD			WANTAGH AVE., NO. OF JERUSALEM AVE.	Wantagh	HOME OF CAPT. JOHN SEAMAN BUILT NEAR THIS SITE 1644. PATENTEE TO 300 ACRE TRACT OF HEMPSTEAD PURCHASE
5	DUKE'S LAWS CONVENTION		1939	Front Street and Cooper Square East	Hempstead	HELD NEAR THIS SPOT IN OLD BUILDING, 1664–65
6	FREEPORT POINT SHIPYARD		2014	417 Woodcleft Avenue	Freeport	1924 - 1968 FOUNDED BY FRED AND MIRTO SCOPINICH BUILT RUMRUNNERS, COAST GUARD BOATS, COMMERCIAL VESSELS, & AIR-SEA RESCUE BOATS RECEIVED NAVY EXCELLENCE AWARD DURING WWII; Landmarks Preservation Commission 2014
7	GRIST MILL SITE			MERRICK RD. E. OF RIVERSIDE DR.	Wantagh	COL. JOHN JACKSON GRANTED WHOLE LIBERTY AND PRIVILEGE JERUSALEM RIVER 1704; ALSO CONBURY PATENT 1708 FROM QUEEN ANNE (NOW JONES BEACH).
8	HOME OF ALEXANDER DAVISON			OCEAN & ATLANTIC AVES.	East Rockaway	HOME OF ALEXANDER DAVISON, SON OF ROBERT DAVISON, REVOLUTIONARY SOLDIER, WHOSE GRANDSON CHARLES AND FAMILY LIVED HERE UNTIL THE YEAR 1921
9	HOMESTEAD SITE			MERRICK RD. E. OF CENTRAL BLVD.	Freeport	1687–1884, SIX GENERATIONS OF THE JONATHAN SMITH JR. BRANCH ROCK SMITH FAMILY. LONG ISLAND SETTLERS, 1664
10	TRUBIA RIFLE		2015	Church Street and North Main Street	Freeport	TROPHY GUN OBTAINED FROM THE US NAVY DEPARTMENT WAS UNVEILED ON JULY 4, 1902 BY THE DBP MOTT POST OF THE GRAND ARMY OF THE REPUBLIC; William G. Pomeroy Foundation 2015
11	VILLAGE HALL - 1928			North Ocean Avenue	Freeport	ALSO KNOWN AS THE MUNICIPAL BUILDING. IT WAS BUILT TO REPLICATE INDEPENDENCE HALL IN PHILADELPHIA ENLARGED 1973
12	INDIAN TRAIL			NYS 27 & SEAMAN NECK RD.	Seaford	INDIAN TRAIL AND SEAMAN'S NECK PATH THROUGH TRACT PURCHASED FROM MASSAPEQUA INDIANS, 1664, BY CAPTAIN JOHN SEAMAN; BECAME PUBLIC HIGHWAY, 1762
13	JERUSALEM		2009	WANTAGH AVE., N. OF Jerusalem Ave at Duck Pond Drive N.	Wantagh	AN EARLY ENGLISH SETTLEMENT ESTABLISHED IN THIS AREA CIRCA 1666 BY JOHN SEAMAN A FOUNDER OF THE TOWN OF HEMPSTEAD IN 1644; Jerusalem Chapter NSDAR 2009
14	LINDBERGH'S FLIGHT		1936	Cradle of Aviation Museum	Garden City	ON MAY 20, 1927, COL. CHARLES A. LINDBERGH ROSE 1/4 MILE WEST FROM ROOSEVELT FIELD, LANDING 33 HOURS LATER AT LE BOURGET FIELD, FRANCE
15	MEETING HOUSE			WANTAGH AVE., NO. OF JERUSALEM AVE.	Wantagh	BUILT 1827 BY RELIGIOUS SOCIETY OF FRIENDS, FIRST MEETING IN JERUSALEM HELD AT HOME OF BENJAMIN SEAMAN, 1699
16	NORTH JERUSALEM AVENUE			WANTAGH AVE., NO. OF SOUTHERN STATE PKWY.	Wantagh	VERY OLD ROUTE FROM HEMPSTEAD TO JERUSALEM SETTLED 1644
17	RICHARD JACKSON			WANTAGH AVE., S. OF STRATFORD RD.	Wantagh	CAPTAIN, JERUSALEM COMPANY, QUEENS CO. MILITIA 1776, LIVED HERE: DAUGHTER JANE M. LT. JOHN ALTHAUSE, HESSIAN ON BRITISH EVACUATION 1783
18	ROCK HALL		1954	Rock Hall Museum	Lawrence	COLONIAL MANOR HOUSE BUILT BY JOSIAH MARTIN 1767 RESIDENCE OF HEWLETT FAMILY 1824–1948 OWNED BY TOWN OF HEMPSTEAD
19	SAINT AGNES			NW CORNER OF CLINTON AVE. AND QUEALY PL.	Rockville Centre	1887 FIRST MASS CELEBRATED, 1904 FIRST CHURCH ERECTED, 1935 PRESENT CHURCH ERECTED, 1957 DIOCESE OF RVC EST., 1981 CATHEDRAL RENOVATED, STATE EDUCATION DEPARTMENT
20	SAND HOLE CHURCH			BABYLON TRNPKE. & SEAMAN AVE.	Freeport	SITE OF CONVERTED STORE. FIRST METHODIST CHURCH IN FREEPORT, 1833–58 NEAR CORNER OF OLD CROOKED AVENUE
21	SITE OF COL. RICHARD HEWLETT HOME		1936	MAIN ST., BETWEEN CARMAN AND GRANT AVES.	East Rockaway	FAMOUS TORY OF LONG ISLAND, WHO PLANNED TO CAPTURE GEN. GEORGE WASHINGTON
22	SITE OF STAGE COACH STOP ROUTE BROOKLYN TO BABYLON			BABYLON TRNPKE. S. OF MEADOWBROOK RD.	Merrick	MERRICK POST OFFICE AND GENERAL STORE 1840–73; "LIBERTY FLAG POLE" 1862–92
23	SITE OF FIRST GRIST AND SAW MILL			E. ROCKAWAY RD. OCEAN AVE.	East Rockaway	BUILT BY JOSEPH HAVILAND IN 1688. LAST OPERATORS CHARLES DAVISON AND SONS, ROBERT, HERBERT, AND JOHN
24	SITE OF FIRST GRIST AND SAW MILL		1935	MILL RD., E. OF NASSAU RD.	Freeport	OF DANIEL RAYNOR RAYNORTOWN SETTLED BY EDWARD RAYNOR OR HIS CHILDREN, 1659
25	SITE OF INDIAN VILLAGE LODGES			NYS 27, W. OF CENTRAL BLVD.	Merrick	SITE OF INDIAN VILLAGE LODGES OF MEROKE TRIBE WERE FEW HUNDRED FEET SOUTH. MERRICK SETTLED IN 1643. FLAG POLE" 1862–92
26	SITE OF HOME ROBERT JACKSON		1935	WANTAGH AVE., S. OF HEMPSTEAD AVE.	Wantagh	SITE OF HOME ROBERT JACKSON PIONEER SETTLER JERUSALEM, 1644. PATENTEE TO TRACT SOUTHWARD AFTER HEMPSTEAD PURCHASE
27	SITE OF OVEN		2000	MAIN ST., SO. OF ATLANTIC AVE.	East Rockaway	FIRST OVEN FOR PUBLIC USE. SOLD BY AARON ALBURTIS TO ISAAC BLOOM IN 1760. BREAD WAS BAKED HERE FOR THREE CENTS TWICE A WEEK FOR NEIGHBORS. East Rockaway Centennial 2000
29	TEMPLE BETH EL		2023	46 Locust Avenue	Cedarhurst	CONGREGATION INCORPORATED NOVEMBER 11, 1922 AS UNITED COMMUNITY CENTER. BUILT THIS SYNAGOGUE IN 1923 & DEDICATED ON SEPTEMBER 14, 1924. William G. Pomeroy Foundation 2023
30	WANTAGH		1936	WANTAGH AVE., Old Railroad Station Museum Complex	Wantagh	FIRST SETTLEMENT 1644 NAMED IN MEMORY OF GRAND SACHEM OF MONTAUKS 1651–1658
31	WASHINGTON TOUR 1790		1999	MERRICK RD. E. AT CEDAR CREEK PARK 40.664754, -73.507073	Wantagh	PRESIDENT GEORGE WASHINGTON TRAVELLED NEAR THIS SITE APRIL 21, 1790, WHILE TOURING LONG ISLAND TO THANK SUPPORTERS OF THE WAR EFFORT; Jerusalem Chapter NSDAR 1999

=== Town of North Hempstead ===
	Marker name	Image	Date designated	Location	City or Town	Marker text
1	ALICIA PATTERSON		1998	119 Middle Neck Road	Sands Point	IN TRIBUTE TO ALICIA PATTERSON, 1906–1963 WAS A CO-PUBLISHER & EDITOR. SHE FOUNDED & LED LONG ISLAND'S NEWSDAY TO STATUS OF A MAJOR DAILY NEWSPAPER. George E. Pataki, Governor
2	CEDARMERE		2013	225 Bryant Avenue	Roslyn Harbor	THE HOME FROM 1843 TO 1878 OF WILLIAM CULLEN BRYANT (1794–1878), PROMINENT AMERICAN POET, NEWSPAPER EDITOR AND CIVIC LEADER; William G. Pomeroy Foundation 2013
3	MONFORT CEMETERY		2017	Entrance of Montfort Cemetery	Port Washington	GRAVESITES OF EARLY SETTLERS BURIED FROM 1737 TO 1892 INCLUDING THE ONDERDONK, HEGEMAN, DODGE, RAPELJE AND SCHENCK FAMILIES. William G. Pomeroy Foundation 2017
4	ROSLYN GRIST MILL		2018	1347 Old Northern Boulevard	Roslyn	BUILT BETWEEN 1715–1741, THIS RARE SURVING DUTCH- FRAMED WATERMILL OPERATED FOR OVER 150 YEARS. SERVED AS A TEA HOUSE 1920–1974. William G. Pomeroy Foundation 2018
5	ROSLYN HISTORIC DISTRICT MAIN STREET		October 9, 1966	Main Street and East Broadway	Roslyn	In this block stand 37 structures built 1690–1865. Town of North Hempstead Marker erected October 9, 1966.
6	ROSLYN HISTORIC DISTRICT MAIN STREET		October 9, 1966	Main Street and Tower Place	Roslyn	In this block stand 37 structures built 1690–1865. Town of North Hempstead Marker erected October 9, 1966.
7	SAINT MARY'S EPISCOPAL CHURCH		July 9, 1999	Rushmore Avenue and Roslyn Avenue	Carle Place	Erected 1926. Oldest Church in Carle Place, New York. New York State Landmark Site. Erected July 9, 1999.
8	TIDAL GRIST MILL		2020	190 Grist Mill Lane	Great Neck	BUILT CA. 1715 BY HENRY ALLEN TO GRIND CORN AND GRAIN. AFTER 1833 OPERATED BY THE UDALL FAMILY. RESTORED CA. 1940 BY LOUISE UDALL ELDRIDGE. William G. Pomeroy Foundation 2020
9	WILLIAM CULLEN BRYANT		2017	225 Bryant Avenue	Roslyn Harbor	NEW YORK EVENING POST EDITOR 1829–1878 SUPPORTED ABOLITION, UNION RIGHTS, AMERICAN ART, PUBLIC LIBRARIES AND PARKS. Press Club of Long Island

=== Town of Oyster Bay ===
	Marker name	Image	Date designated	Location	City or Town	Marker text
1	Arthur F. White		2018	215 Broadway	Bethpage	Funeral home - Bethpage - 1946. 5 generations funeral dirs. Previous home - circa - 1910 of Albert and Katherine Guerin prominent community family Sponsored by Nancy White
2	Bethpage - JFK		October 8, 2014	500 Broadway	Bethpage	1963 - First school in USA named for assassinated President John F. Kennedy in tribute by Bethpage Board of Education; Sponsored by Terrence Clark
3	Bethpage Hamlet		2017	215 Broadway	Bethpage	1687 T. Powell obtains land. 1695 Deed Bethpage Purchase. 1857 Name Jerusalem Station. 1867 Renamed Central Park. 1936 Changed To Bethpagen; Central Park Historical Society
4	Broad Spring			Central Avenue and Meeting House Road	Farmingdale 40.7438°N 73.4611°W	This spring marks point laid out in first highway survey of Bethpage made 1732 by Samuel Willis.
5	Cantiag Woods		1952	Cantiague Lane and West John Street	Hicksville	Northwest corner of land conveyed by Indian deed to Robert Williams 1648. Rock placed as Town boundary marker 1745.
6	Carll Hill Road		February 2024	Carll Hill Road and Pine Hollow Road	Oyster Bay	Named after Civil War veteran David Carll, a free Black man who volunteered in 1864 to serve in the 26th N.Y. United States Colored Troop Regiment. Funded through a government stipend and by philanthropists, including James Roosevelt, uncle of President Theodore Roosevelt. Upon returning home after the war in 1865, soon after President Abraham Lincoln signed the Emancipation Proclamation, David and wife Louisa Appleford Carll purchased land in the Pine Hollow community that continues to house generations of his descendants to this day. David's legacy is an important chapter in the history of Oyster Bay and the nation.
7	Chin Chin Ranch		2025	460 Clocks Boulevard	Massapequa	1913–1925. Country home of Fred Stone. One of the most acclaimed and beloved stars of American musical comedy for more than half a century. Historical Society of the Massapequas 40.665635°N 73.426288°W
8	Council Rock		1939	Entrance of Council Rock Cemetery	Oyster Bay	Here George Fox, 1672, met with Wrights, Underhill and Feeke at Quaker Gatherings. State Education Department
9	Fort Hill		July 9, 2026	Entrance of Fort Hill Cemetery	Oyster Bay	Robert Townsend: Washington's Secret Agent; Established in 1668, this site began as a private burying ground when John Townsend was laid to rest on his own land. John and his brother Henry Townsend, founder of the first mill in Oyster Bay, were signers of the Flushing Remonstrance of 1657, a landmark document advocating religious tolerance. Following persecution by Governor Peter Stuyvesant, the Townsends relocated to Oyster Bay in search of greater freedom. Also buried here is Robert Townsend (1753–1838), known as "Culper Jr.," a key member of General George Washington's Culper Spy Ring during the American Revolution. Operating under the cover of a Manhattan merchant, Townsend gathered vital intelligence for Washington. His reports traveled by courier to Setauket, by whaleboat across Long Island Sound to Connecticut, and onward by horseback to Washington's headquarters. After his father's death in 1790, Robert Townsend returned to the family home, now Raynham Hall Museum, where he lived until his death. His role as Washington's secret agent remained unknown until 1930, when it was revealed by New York historian Morton Pennypacker.
10	Fortified Hill		1932	Orchard Street and Prospect Street	Oyster Bay	Occupied by Colonel Simcoe's Queens Rangers 1779–1781. State Education Department
11	Farmingdale LIRR Station			Depot Avenue and Atlantic Avenue	Farmingdale	Original station located at Main Street to which rail service began on October 15, 1841. Permanent station built in 1896. Tower added in 1905 to house electrical equipment. Farmingdale-Bethpage Historical Society
12	First Firehouse		May 30, 2005	428 Stewart Avenue	Bethpage	Original site of Central Park Firehouse erected with donations from sixty one residents. Firehouse served the hamlet from 1910 to 1948; Erected by Bethpage Fire District
13	First Post Office		May 2014	Seaman Avenue and Central Avenue	Bethpage	January 29, 1857 1st post office in village. Jeremiah Weaver Postmaster. Ahern Home - W. Ahern involved. In 1936 - name change from Central Park to Bethpage; Central Park Historical Society
14	Grumman 1930–94		June 22, 2003	Central Avenue and Hickey Boulevard	Bethpage	Site of their first Airfield & Plant #1. Est. Oct. 1936 in Bethpage, N.Y. Birthplace of the famous F4F-3 Wildcat Navy Fighter. Central Park Historical Society
15	Grumman 1930–94		June 25, 2004	Grumman Airport and South Broadway	Bethpage	On Dec. 7, 1941 while Pearl Harbor was under attack, this Assembly Building #2 was dedicated to build the TBF Avengers and F6F Hellcats; Grumman Retiree Club Inc.
16	Grumman Corp 1936–94		October 5, 2006	South Oyster Bay Road and Grumman Road West	Bethpage	Birthplace of the Apollo lunar modules that landed men on the moon from July 20, 1969, to Dec 11 1972; Sponsored by Steel Equities
17	Historic Complex			4751 Merrick Road	Massapequa	1844 Old Grace Church. DeLancey Floyd-Jones Library 1896. 1870 Floyd-Jones Servant Cottage. Floyd-Jones Burial Ground 1892. 1960 Home of the Historical Society of the Massapequas
18	Home of Samuel Jones			Merrick Rd., E. of NYS 107	Massapequa	Home of Samuel Jones 1734–1819. Father of the N.Y. Bar. Grandson of Thomas Jones. Studied law with William Smith.
19	L. I. Motor Pkwy		September 29, 2012	Stewart Avenue and Arthur Avenue	Bethpage	First parkway in America built for the automobile & famed Vanderbilt Cup races. Ground breaking in Central Park (Bethpage) June 6, 1908; Central Park Historical Society
20	L. I. Motor Pkwy		September 29, 2012	194 Central Avenue	Bethpage	10/10 1908 – 4/17 1938. Private toll road from Queens to Ronkonkoma AKA Vanderbilt Parkway. Also hosted auto racing Central Park Historical Society
21	Kessler Glass		June 28, 2009	300 Broadway Avenue	Bethpage	Site of Warren Kessler Inc. manufacturer of hand-blown lamps & vases 1938-78 that have graced the White House and U.S. Embassies worldwide Donated by Kessler Family
22	Manetto Hill School		2020	55 Manetto Hill Road	Plainview	First school est. ca 1820. This two-room building, built 1899, was Plainview's only school until 1951. Class held here until 1960. William G. Pomeroy Foundation 2020
23	Matinecock Lodge			14 West Main Street	Oyster Bay	Masonic lodge of President Theodore Roosevelt, 26th President of the United States. Raised to a Master Mason April 24, 1901. Matinecock Lodge N0 806 F & AM
24	Presbyterian Church			60 East Main Street	Oyster Bay	Completed in 1873, stick-style architecture. Boyhood church of Theodore Roosevelt, 26th President. Listed on National Register of Historic Places. J. Cleveland Cady, Architect
25	Powell Cemetery		2008	Entrance of Powell Cemetery	Bethpage	Established - 1817. Herein rests descendants of Thomas Powell who purchased from Native Americans 1695 and named the area Bethpage; Owen Murphy Eagle Scout 2008
26	Powell Home		1932	33 Merritts Road	Farmingdale	Built by Thomas Powell in 1700 after purchase of Bethpage from Massapequa Indian tribe October 18, 1695.
27	Quaker Meeting House		1932	24 Quaker Meeting House Road	Farmingdale	Quaker Meeting House built and first meetings held 1698.
28	Raynham Hall		1949	30 West Main Street	Oyster Bay	Built 1740, used by British as Col Simcoe's headquarters; information from here led to Major Andre's capture after his visits, home of Robert Townsend. State Education Department
29	Sagamore Hill		1932	66 Sagamore Hill Road	Cove Neck	Home of Theodore Roosevelt. Governor of New York. President of the United States. State Education Department
30	Site of Central Park Cider Mill		September 29, 2012	462 Stewart Avenue	Bethpage	George Benkert, proprietor ca. 1888 processed apples for local farmers Central Park Historical Society
31	Site of Central Park New School K–8 (Powell Avenue School)		May 31, 2009	47 Powell Avenue	Bethpage	8 Classrooms brick building. Dedicated 1911 – Razed 1962. Motto "Aim High Succeed"; Family of Dan Schiavetta
32	Site of the Beau Sejour		May 23, 1999	Stewart Avenue and Central Avenue	Bethpage 40.738876°N 73.481548°W	World famous restaurant host to the rich & famous. Owned & operated by the Wilson Family 1907 – 1975; Central Park Historical Society
33	Swedetown		August 11, 2021	Flamingo Lane and Caffrey Avenue	Bethpage 40.758836°N 73.477798°W	North Central Park / Bethpage Scandinavian settlement. 1919 - Formed a social club. 1924 - Founded Civic Association to promote quality of life In memory of Bob Albertson
34	Theodore Roosevelt		2019	134 Cove Road	Oyster Bay	1858-1919 NY Governor 1898-1900 President of the United States 1901-1909 buried here. William G. Pomeroy Foundation 2019
35	Tryon Hall Site		1992	Beverly Avenue and Cartwright Boulevard	Massapequa	1770 Georgian Manor House, also named Fort Neck House. Owned by 7 generations of Colonial Jones / Floyd-Jones families. Razed in 1940. Historical Society of the Massapequas
36	Youngs Home		1932	Cove Neck Road and Cove Road	Oyster Bay	George Washington rested here on April 23/24, 1790, while on his Long Island tour. State Education Department
37	Zorn's Est 1930		October 9, 2020	4321 Hempstead Turnpike	Bethpage	Site of Zorn's poultry farm founded by the Zorn family. The retail store opened in 1940 serving Bethpage and surrounding communities With pride Merrill S. Zorn

=== City of Glen Cove ===
	Marker name	Image	Date designated	Location	City or Town	Marker text
1	DOSORIS		1967	Dosoris Lane and Old Tappan Road	Glen Cove	("Wife's Dowry"), Home of Benjamin Woolsey, colonial clergyman and ancestor of several college presidents. City of Glen Cove - Erected 1967
2	EAST ISLAND		1967	1 Southland Drive	Glen Cove	Bought from the Indians by Robert Williams, June 22, 1667. Home of J.P. Morgan 1909–1943. City of Glen Cove - Erected 1967
3	LIBERTY POLE		1967	School Street and Brewster Street	Glen Cove	Near this spot a flagpole was erected during the early days of the Civil War. City of Glen Cove - Erected 1967
4	METHODIST CHURCH		1967	70 School Street	Glen Cove	Founded in 1785 by circuit rider Ezekiel Cooper. One of the oldest Methodist organizations on Long Island. City of Glen Cove - Erected 1967
5	QUAKER MEETING		1967	267 Duck Pond Road	Glen Cove	Founded in 1671, oldest officially organized Friends Meeting in the United States. Building erected in 1725. City of Glen Cove - Erected 1967
6	R.R. STATION		1967	Glen Street LIRR Station	Glen Cove	First train to New York from Glen Cove Glen Street. May 16, 1867. City of Glen Cove - Erected 1967
7	SAW MILL		1967	Herb Hill Road and Charles Street	Glen Cove	Erected on this site by Joseph Carpenter in 1668. City of Glen Cove - Erected 1967
8	STARCH WORKS		1967	Glen Cove Avenue and Charles Street	Glen Cove	Located here 1855. Largest corn starch manufacturing plant in the world. Building destroyed in the Great Fire of 1906. City of Glen Cove - Erected 1967
9	SUFFRAGISTS		2017	127 Dosoris Lane	Glen Cove	Helen Sherman Pratt and Florence Gibb Pratt, sisters-in-law who advocated for woman's voting rights ca. 1917, lived near here. William G. Pomeroy Foundation 2017 392
10	THE PLACE		1967	The Place and Ellwood Street	Glen Cove	The first settlers built their homes along this street in 1668. City of Glen Cove - Erected 1967
11	THE LANDING		2017	Landing Road and Germain Street	Glen Cove	Named for the steamboat wharf built here ca. 1829 by William Weeks serving the New York City to Glen Cove route until 1916. William G. Pomeroy Foundation 2017 447

=== City of Long Beach ===
	Marker name	Image	Date designated	Location	City or Town	Marker text
1	COBBLE VILLA			657 Laurelton Boulevard	Long Beach	Erected circa 1912 for the late Senator Reynolds, developer of City of Long Beach. Placed on the National Register of Historic Places by the U.S. Department of Interior. The Steele Residence since 1978
2	TEMPLE ISRAEL		2023	75 East Walnut Street	Long Beach	CONGREGATION INCORPORATED OCTOBER 14, 1920 BY RESIDENTS OF MANHATTAN, BROOKLYN AND LONG BEACH. SYNAGOGUE DEDICATED AUGUST 31, 1924. William G. Pomeroy Foundation 2023
3	THE LIRR STATION			19 West Park Avenue	Long Beach	The Long Beach station was opened in 1909 soon after the closing of a station just south of here. The City of Long Beach and the LIRR renovated the station in 1986; Long Beach Island Landmarks Association

== See also ==
- List of New York State Historic Markers
- National Register of Historic Places listings in New York
- List of National Historic Landmarks in New York
