= Robert Coles (settler) =

Early settler in New England

Deputy in the Massachusetts Bay Colony General Court
- In office 1632
- Constituency: Roxbury

Elected Committeeman for Providence
- 1640: Committee to form a new government with Chad Brown, William Harris, and John Warner

Personal details
- Born: c. 1600 England
- Died: 1655 Warwick, Rhode Island Colony
- Spouses: Mary (unknown surname); Mary Hawxhurst
- Children: 7
- Occupation: farmer; miller; politician
- Known for: Scarlet-letter punishment; Rhode Island original proprietor

Robert Coles (c. 1600 – 1655) was a 17th-century New England colonist who is known for the scarlet-letter punishment he received in the Massachusetts Bay Colony and his role as an original proprietor of Providence and co-author of the Providence Combination of 1640, which established the first secular, representative democracy in America.

Coles arrived in Massachusetts Bay in 1630 on the Winthrop Fleet where he became a first settler of the towns of Roxbury and Agawam, now Ipswich, and an early settler of Salem. After repeated fines for drunkenness, he was ultimately sentenced to wear a red letter "D" as a badge of shame for a year, an event that may have served as an inspiration for Nathaniel Hawthorne's 1850 novel The Scarlet Letter.

He left Massachusetts Bay to join Roger Williams at Providence where he was one of the 13 original proprietors and a founding member of the First Baptist Church in America. He was a first settler of Pawtuxet and an early settler of Shawomet, now the Rhode Island towns of Cranston and Warwick.

The Providence Combination of 1640 was signed by both men and women in Providence and contained 12 articles that defined borders, created elected arbitrators, and affirmed liberty of conscience.

After Coles's death his family moved to Long Island, New York. Three of his sons founded the city of Glen Cove, New York, while three of his daughters married into the Townsend family who engaged in civil disobedience to promote the separation of church and state.

== Massachusetts Bay ==
=== Arrival and settlements ===
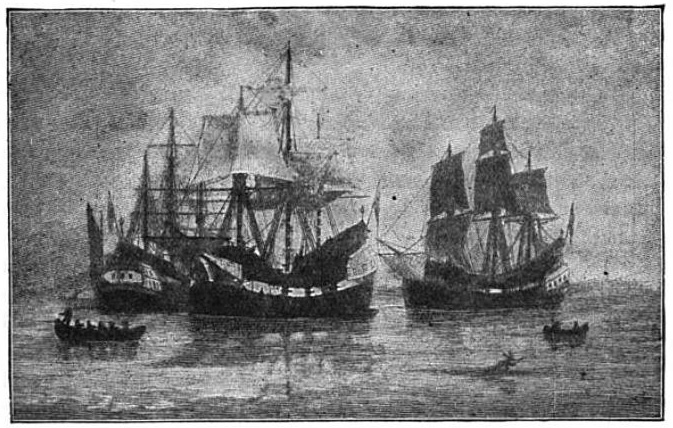
Arrival of the Winthrop Colony, by William F. Halsall

Coles arrived in New England in the summer of 1630 as a passenger in the Winthrop Fleet, and was among the first settlers of the town of Roxbury. In October of that year he petitioned the Massachusetts Bay Colony's General Court in Boston to become a freeman and in 1631 he took the freeman's oath. He was a founding member of the First Church of Roxbury, which was a non-separating Congregationalist church established in 1631, and in 1632 he was one of two townsmen elected to represent Roxbury in the General Court. During his term, Massachusetts Bay became the first colony to adopt formal arbitration laws.

In 1633, Coles was in the first company, led by John Winthrop the Younger, that went to Agawam where he was granted a large home lot on the Ipswich River at present-day East and Cogswell Streets and 200 acres—a property now called Greenwood Farm—on the neck of land north of town. He moved to Salem in 1635 where he received a home lot in town and 300 acres of farmland south of Felton Hill "in the place where his cattle are by Brooksby."

=== The scarlet letter ===
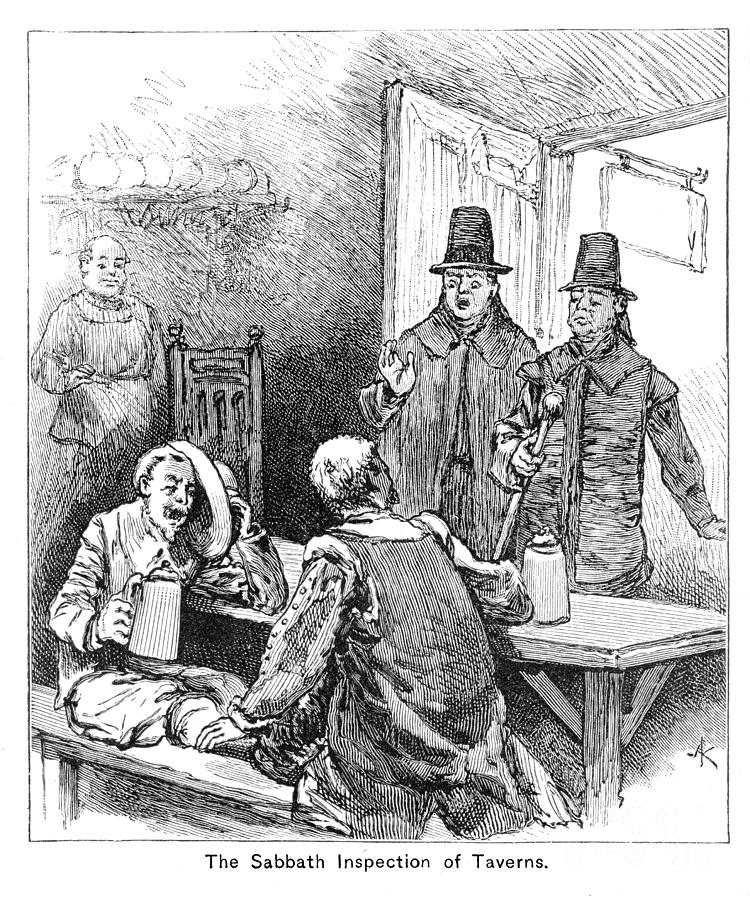
Sabbath inspection of taverns

In 1631, Coles was fined five marks or £3.33 (equivalent to US$779 in 2025) for drunkenness aboard the Friendship and at Winnissimet, now Chelsea. The Friendship was carrying two hogsheads (more than 120 gallons) of flavored mead called metheglin. Coles's fellow carousers—who were not pious Puritans—included Edward Gibbons, a former polytheist "who chose rather to Dance about a May pole...than to hear a good Sermon" and Samuel Maverick, a wealthy Anglican "very ready to entertain strangers." In 1632, Coles was again fined for drunkenness, this time in Charlestown. In addition to his fine of £1 he was required to appear before the General Court and the Court of Assistants to publicly confess.

Coles was charged a third time for drunkenness in 1633, along with fellow settler John Shatswell, at Agawam. Shatswell was fined £2, but Coles was fined £10 (equivalent to US$2,599 in 2025) for multiple offenses: drunkenness, encouraging Shatswell's wife to drink, and "intiseing her to incontinency (Note: Incontinency, or adultery, was a capital offense ("...both shalbe punished by death") and not a misdemeanor, so he was more likely convicted of merely "enticing" and not fornication.) and other misdemeanor." Coles was also sentenced "to stand with a whte sheete of pap on his back wherein a drunkard shalbe written in great letters, & stand therewith soe longe as the Court thinks meete...." He was charged a fourth time in 1634, this time in Roxbury, and the court responded with more severe penalties: he was forced to wear a red letter "D" (for drunkenness) for a year and was disenfranchised (deprived of voting rights).

The court orders that Coles, for drunkenness by him committed at Roxbury shall be disfranchized, weare about his necke & soe to hange upon his outward garment a D made of redd clothe & sett upon white, to contynue this for a yeare & not to leave it off at any tyme when hee comes amongst company....

Coles was re-enfranchised just two months later and was never again charged with drunkenness. However, his wife, Mary, was accused of intemperance in the Roxbury church records, where it was noted that "after her husband's excommunication and falls, she did too much favor his ways...." (Note: From the Roxbury church records: "Mary Cole, the wife of Robert Cole. God also wrought vpon her heart (as it was hoped after her coming to NE) but after her husband's excommunication, & falls she did too much favor his ways, yet not as to incur any just blame, she lived an aflicted life, by reason of his vnsetlednesse & removing fro place to place.")

The sanctions against Coles are referenced in historical fiction. His red-letter punishment is mentioned in Anya Seton's 1958 bestselling historical novel, The Winthrop Woman, about the governor's daughter-in-law, Elizabeth Fones. He appears as a minor character in Jackie French Koller's 1995 historical novel, Primrose Way, in which the author notes he "was indeed 'a known tippler' and was arrested for drunkenness and sentenced to wear a sign about his neck...."

Some scholars argue that Coles's red-letter punishment was among those Nathaniel Hawthorne had in mind when he wrote the 1850 novel, The Scarlet Letter, which chronicles the struggles of a fictional woman sentenced to wear a red letter for adultery. Melissa McFarland Pennell, a University of Massachusetts English professor, recounts Coles's punishment in her book The historian's Scarlet letter: reading Nathaniel Hawthorne's masterpiece as social and cultural history (2018). In Henry Augustin Beers's Initial Studies in American Letters (1895), the late Yale University literary historian wrote:

The reader of Winthrop's Journal comes everywhere upon hints which the imagination has since shaped into poetry and romance. The germs of many of Longfellow's "New England Tragedies," of Hawthorne's "Maypole of Merrymount," and Endicott's "Red Cross," and of Whittier's "John Underbill" and "The Familists' Hymn" are all to be found in some dry, brief entry of the old Puritan diarist. "Robert Cole, having been oft punished for drunkenness, was now ordered to wear a red D about his neck for a year," to wit, the year 1633, and thereby gave occasion to the greatest American romance, "The Scarlet Letter."

== Providence ==
=== Arrival and settlements ===
Roger Williams—a Salem preacher who advocated for church-state separation and Native American land rights—was banished from Massachusetts Bay Colony in 1635 and in the following year he acquired land from Canonicus and Miantonomi, the chief sachems of the Narragansett people, to create the town of Providence. By 1637 Robert Coles moved from Salem to Providence and in 1638 he became one of Providence's first 13 proprietors and a founding member of the first Baptist church congregation in America. At the inaugural church meeting, at least twelve settlers gathered together with Roger Williams who, after being baptized by Ezekiel Holliman, baptized Coles and the others.

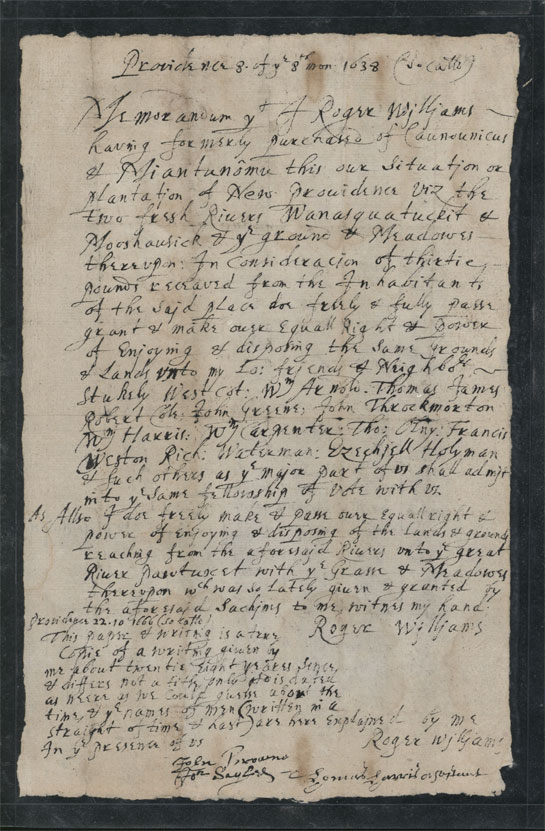
Initial deed

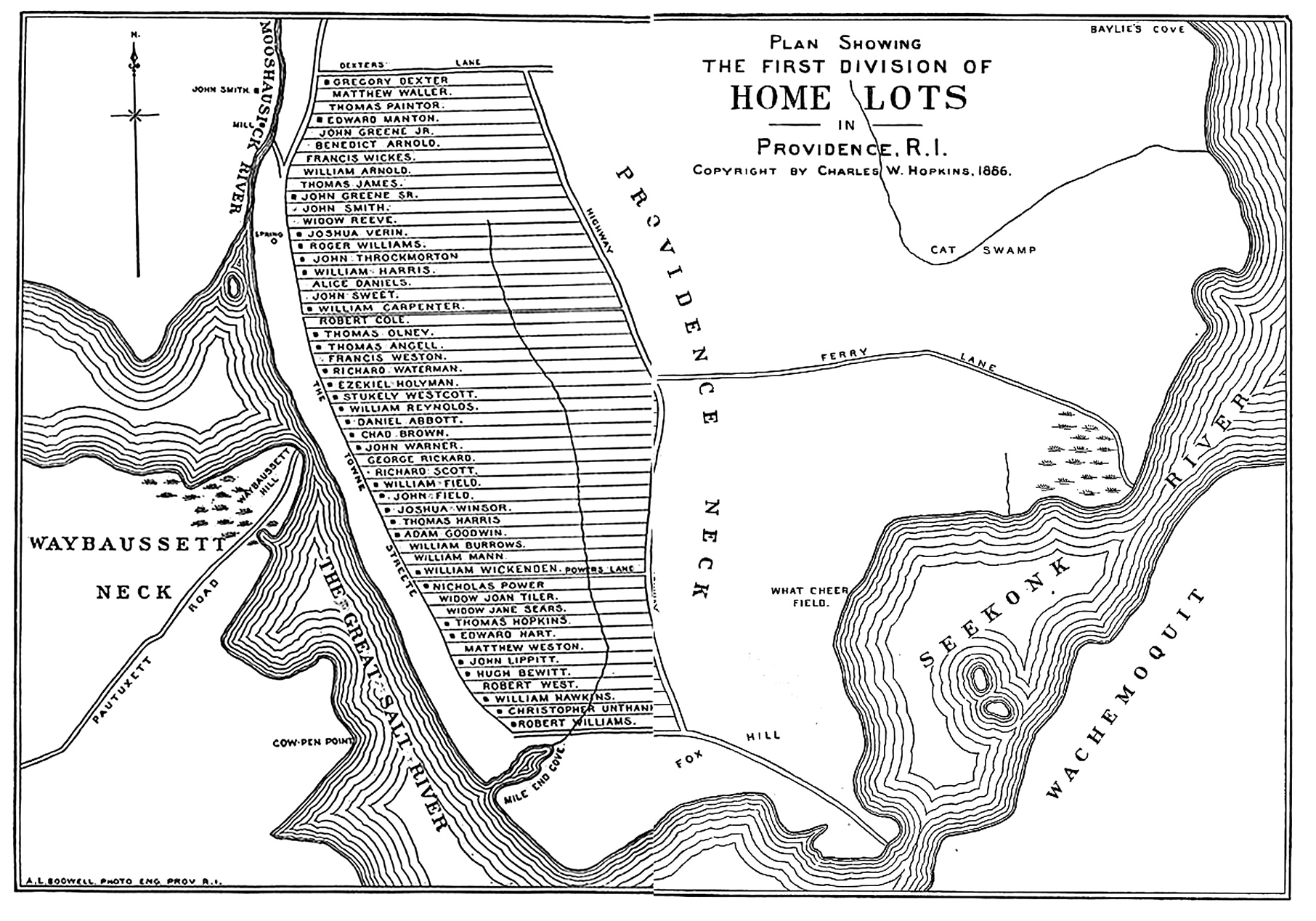
Original home lot map

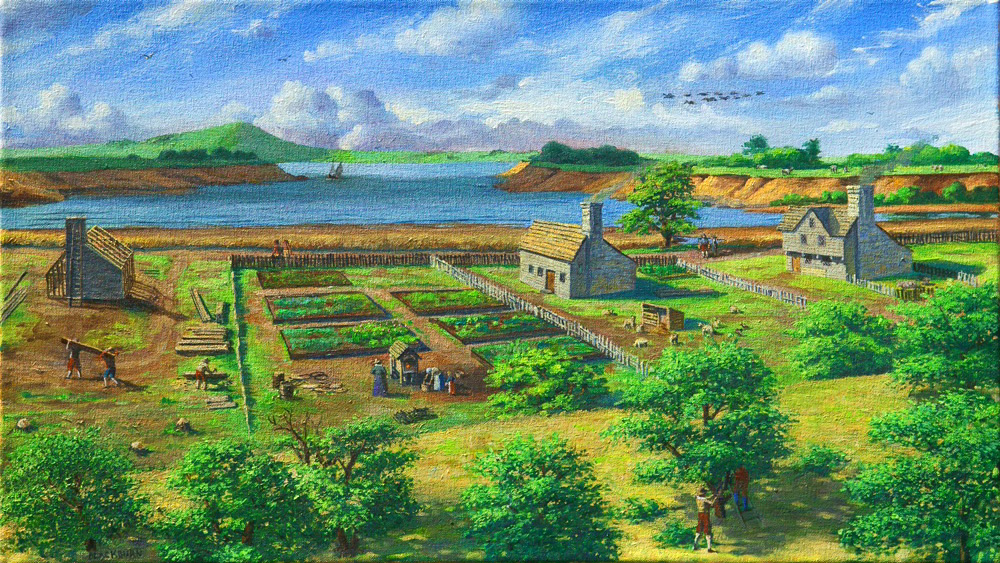
Great Salt Cove c. 1650

Each of the original proprietors received a narrow, five- or six-acre, river-front home lot that stretched eastward from Towne Street, now Main Street, to "a highway," now Hope Street in present-day College Hill, Providence, and they received shares of upland and meadow on the south side of town. Robert Coles's home lot was on the Great Salt Cove between the lots of Thomas Olney and William Carpenter and along the ancient "highway" called the Wampanoag trail, now Meeting Street. The land granted to him south of town laid east of Mashapaug Pond.

Roger Williams sold land north of the Pawtuxet River to Coles and twelve others on August 8, 1638, with full payment confirmed on October 3. Soon after the 1638 purchase, Coles built a home on the Pawtuxet River near the falls in present-day Pawtuxet Village.

Previous to 1639, the Pawtuxet sachem Socononoco sold land to Roger Williams that stretched from the meadows on the Pawtuxet River southward to Conimicut Point. On January 1, 1639, Williams sold a share to Coles that included an inland meadow and land at Passeonkquis Cove and Namquid, now called Gaspee Point, and Coles was granted permission by the Pawtuxet tribe to graze cattle on their farmland in the winter. On February 10, 1641, Coles received a confirmatory deed from the sachems Canonicus and Miantonomi.

By 1648—the year Shawomet was renamed to honor the Earl of Warwick—Coles was listed as a townsman of Warwick, where he was a mill proprietor and resided for the remainder of his life.

=== Providence Combination of 1640 ===
Preamble

Wee, Robert Coles, Chad Browne, William Harris, and John Warner, being freely chosen by the consent of our loving friends and neighbors the Inhabitants of this Towne of Providence, having many differences amongst us, they being freely willing and also bound themselves to stand to our Arbitration in all differences amongst us to rest contented in our determination, being so betrusted we have seriously and carefully indeavoured to weigh and consider all those differences, being desirous to bringe to unity and peace, although our abilities are farr short in the due examination of such weighty things, yet so farre as we conceive in laying all things together we have gone the fairest and the equallest way to produce our peace.

— Providence Combination of 1640

Coles, Chad Brown, William Harris, and John Warner co-authored the Providence Combination of 1640 containing proposals for a new form of government and referred to as the Combination. It was signed by 39 male and female townsmen—an early milestone in women's rights. The Combination is listed among the colonial documents that influenced American constitutionalism.

The Combination replaced the direct democracy of the original compact of 1637 with a representative, democratic government designed to solve disputes, especially land disputes. It contained 12 articles that defined the borders of Providence, created an elected board of arbitrators and an appeals process, created town offices, and affirmed the separation of church and state as the determination "to hold forth liberty of conscience." The Combination resolved the problem of assembling a quorum of busy townsmen to make decisions. The General Assembly replaced the arbitration system with a town charter in 1649.

=== Gorton controversy ===
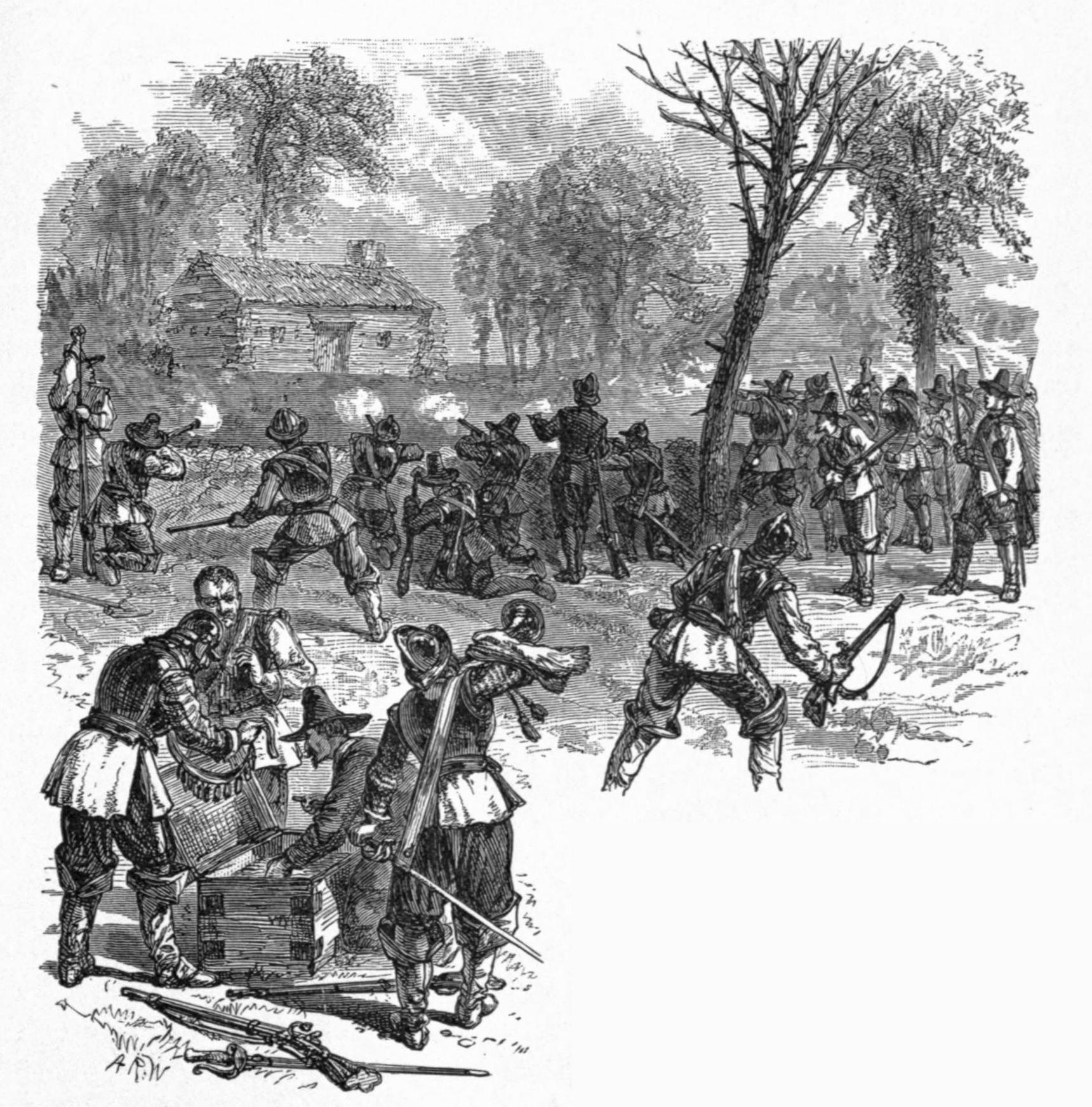
Arrest of Gortonites

In 1641, Coles and John Greene gave Samuel Gorton—a religious leader and agitator fleeing Portsmouth—some of their land in Pawtuxet. The parcel Coles gave to Gorton was at Papaquinapaug, the region near present-day Fenner Pond south of Roger Williams Park. To Coles's dismay, Gorton and his followers, the Gortonites, rejected the authority of the Providence Combination of 1640 and became embroiled in bitter disputes. The trouble began when the Providence arbitrators voted to settle a dispute by seizing some cattle owned by a Gortonite named Francis Weston. The Gortonites fought off the townsmen sent to take the cattle. Seeking a way to expel the Gortonites from Pawtuxet, Coles and three other original Pawtuxet settlers—William Arnold, William Carpenter, and Benedict Arnold—traveled to Boston in 1642 to petition the General Court to place their land under the jurisdiction of Massachusetts Bay Colony. The General Court made Coles and the other three petitioners justices of the peace. The Gortonites moved south to Shawomet, out of the jurisdiction of the justices and Massachusetts Bay, where they purchased 90 square miles from the sachem Miantonomi. Benedict Arnold convinced Socononoco and Pomham, the sachems of Pawtuxet and Shawomet, to complain to Massachusetts Bay that they did not agree to the sale. Gorton and some Gortonites were arrested in 1643 by Massachusetts Bay soldiers after a violent struggle and were taken to Boston to stand trial.

== Personal life ==
Coles was said to suffer from an unusual "vnsetlednesse & removing frō place to place" which, according to the Puritan minister of his former church in Roxbury, contributed to his first wife's death. Notwithstanding, and indeed because of, his unsettledness he acquired hundreds of acres of land in Massachusetts Bay and the Providence Plantations. In 1650, of the 50 tax-payers in Providence, Benedict Arnold paid the highest property tax while five townsmen—Coles, William Arnold, Richard Scott, William Field, and William Carpenter—paid the second highest tax.

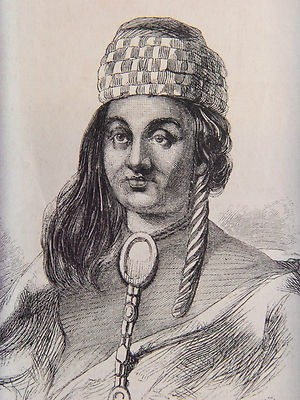
Sachem Ninigret

His religious life, too, was unsettled. He was excommunicated by his Puritan church in Massachusetts Bay, which may have contributed to his moving to Providence. In Providence, he was a founding member of the Baptist church, but it was later said that, in lieu of Christian worship, he "usually conversed with and was conversant amongst the Indians on the Sabbath days" to learn about Native American religion. (Note: According to Samuel Gorton, "...Robert Cole whom they had censured to weare a D on his back for a whole year, to proclaim unto all men his guiltiness of the sin of drunkenness and had also cast him out of their Church, and delivered him unto Satan several times, who before, and in the time of this his submission usually conversed with, and was conversant amongst the Indians on the Sabbath days, professing the Indians' religion to be the same with that which the Massachusetts professed and practised.")

In the winter of 1637, three members of the Pequot tribe escaped captivity in Boston and were taken in by Providence residents. One was a woman who joined Coles's household, probably as a servant. Roger Williams recounted her treatment in Boston: "...of the natives in Boston [she] is used worst: is beaten with firesticks...because a fellow lay with her, but she saith, for her part she refused.” Roger Williams instructed the Providence residents to welcome them and "to walke wisely and justly towards them, so to make mercy eminent...."

Coles occasionally fell out with his indigenous neighbors. In 1649, Nanheggen of Pawtuxet and Wesuontup of Mashapaug were accused of breaking into the Providence homes of Coles and Jane Sayers. Nanheggen, who was one of Coles's workers, was convicted by a jury while Wesuontup was acquitted. In 1652, Coles sold a mastiff dog to Ninigret, the sachem of the Niantic people. The dog ran away from Ninigret and returned to Coles who killed it, possibly to protect poultry or livestock. Coles was fined after Ninigret pressed charges.

== Family ==
Robert Coles, whose ancestry remains unknown, was born c. 1600 probably in England. (Note: According to historian Charles Anderson in The Great Migration Begins (1995), Coles's place of origin and parentage remain unproven.) He and his first wife, Mary, appeared together for the first time in the records of the Roxbury church. Because Mary's death was recorded in an undated note in Roxbury church records, it is thought she died before he moved to Providence. His second wife, Mary Hawxhurst (c. 1602–1656), was the daughter of Sampson Hawxhurst (1571–1627), vicar of Nuneaton in Warwickshire, England, and Elizabeth. (Note: Robert Coles's first son, John, refers to Mary Hawxhurst as his "mother-in-law" in 1655, confirming she was his stepmother.) After Robert Coles's death, Mary Hawxhurst married Matthias Harvey and moved to Oyster Bay on Long Island.

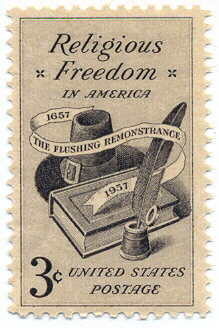
U.S. postage stamp commemorating the Flushing Remonstrance.

Coles had at least seven children, four of whom were under 18 years of age when he died. His children by his first wife, Mary, were John Coles (m. Ann), Deliverance Coles (m. Richard Townsend), and Ann Coles (m. Henry Townsend). His children by his second wife, Mary Hawxhurst, were Daniel Coles (m. Mahershalalhasbaz Gorton, daughter of Samuel Gorton), Nathaniel Coles (m. Martha Jackson, Deborah Wright, Sarah Harcurt), Sarah Coles (m. Captain Thomas Townsend), and Captain Robert Coles Jr. (m. Mercy Wright).

Coles died intestate in 1655 in Warwick. The Warwick town council settled his debts and distributed net assets of about £400 (equivalent to US$122,382 in 2025) to his heirs. The settlement included the sale of the "Mill of Warwick" and land in Pawtuxet to establish a trust worth £170 (equivalent to US$52,012 in 2025) for his minor children.

Three of Coles's daughters married into the Townsend family. The Townsends came to Warwick after conflicts over religious liberty with authorities in the Dutch colony of New Netherland. Ann Coles's husband, Henry Townsend, was fined and imprisoned more than once in New Netherland for hosting Quaker meetings and for political agitation. He signed the Flushing Remonstrance in 1657 to protest the persecution of Quakers and others in New Netherland. A year later Ann Coles was charged with support of the "odious sect." The Townsends later settled in Oyster Bay, which was out of Dutch jurisdiction.

== Legacy and notable descendants ==
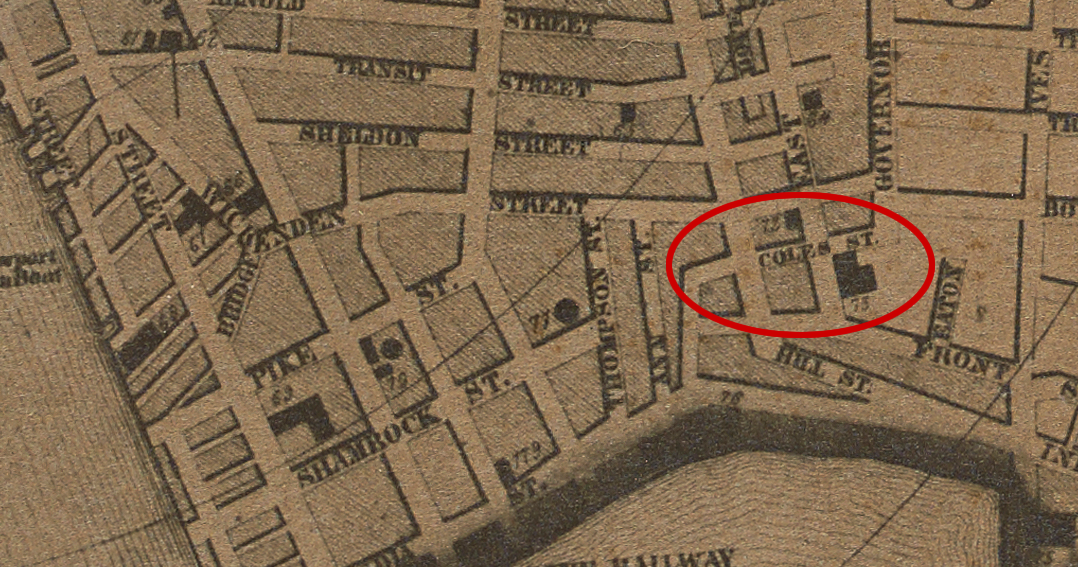
Coles Street in Providence in 1849

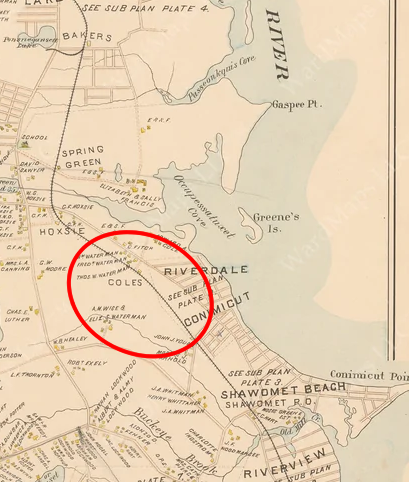
Coles Village in Warwick

A portion of present-day Wickenden Street in Providence that crosses Hope Street and stretches from Governor to Ann Streets was once called Coles Street. Coles Village, south of Hoxie Village in Warwick, Rhode Island, bears the family name.

Three of Coles's sons—Robert Jr., Nathaniel, and Daniel Coles—were original proprietors of Musketa Cove Plantation, now the city of Glen Cove, New York, near Oyster Bay. The home that Robert Coles Jr. built there in 1668 still stands.

The notable descendants of Robert Coles include industrialist Walter Chrysler (1875–1940) who founded the Chrysler Corporation, novelist Miriam Coles Harris (1834–1925), American Revolutionary War spies Robert Townsend (1753–1838) and Sarah "Sally" Townsend (1760–1842) who were siblings and members of the secret Culper Ring, spy Jesse Coles (1757–1839) who was captured while carrying a message to General Washington, and Robert R. Coles (1907–1985) who was chairman of the Hayden Planetarium.
