= Samuel Jones (New York comptroller) =

American politician

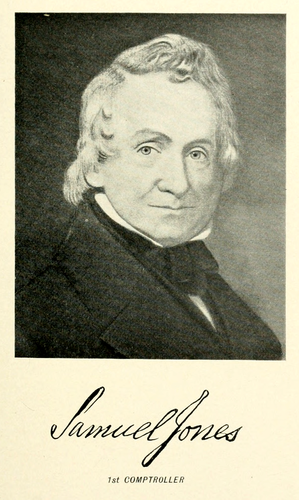

1st Comptroller of New York
- In office March 15, 1797 – 1800
- Preceded by: Peter T. Curtenius
- Succeeded by: John Vernon Henry

Recorder of New York City
- In office 1789–1797
- Preceded by: Richard Varick
- Succeeded by: James Kent

Member of the New York State Senate
- In office 1791–1799

Personal details
- Born: July 26, 1734 Oyster Bay, Province of New York, British America
- Died: November 25, 1819 (aged 85) New York, U.S.
- Spouse: Cornelia Haring
- Children: Samuel Jones
- Parent(s): William Jones; Phoebe Jackson Jones

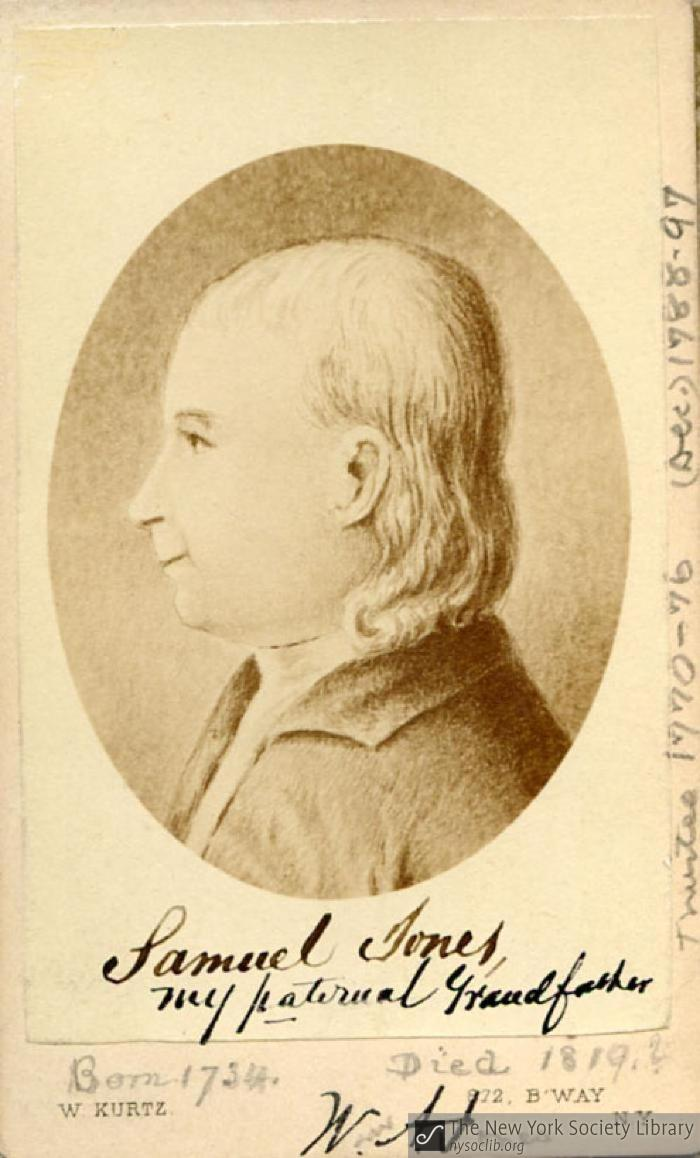
Portrait of Samuel Jones (ca. 1800), New York Society Library.

Samuel Jones (July 26, 1734 – November 25, 1819) was an American lawyer and politician. In 1788, he played a key role in convincing the State of New York to ratify the Constitution of the United States.

== Early life ==
Jones was born on July 26, 1734, in Oyster Bay in what was then the Province of New York. He was the son of William Jones (1708–1779) and Phoebe (née Jackson) Jones (1715–1800).

Thomas Jones, who was also a Record of New York City, was Jones's first cousin as both were grandchildren of Major Thomas Jones who emigrated to Rhode Island from Strabane, in Ireland and became influential figure on Long Island. His paternal grandmother, Freelove (née Townsend) Jones, was daughter of Captain Thomas Townsend.

== Career ==
In 1760, Jones was working in the law office of William Smith, and was admitted in October of that year to practice before the New York Bar. During the New York-Massachusetts boundary dispute of 1784-1786, Jones along with Alexander Hamilton represented New York, and Jones traveled to Boston such as to obtain materials that would support New York's claims.

In 1786, he was appointed along with Richard Varick to collect and publish all of the statutes then in force; with only minor changes by the state legislature, this work by Jones and Varick remained the only comprehensive collection of New York's laws for the remainder of that century. Also in 1786, he was elected from Queens County to the New York State Assembly, as a member of the Anti-Federalist Party aligned with Governor George Clinton, serving in the Assembly until 1790.

Jones was elected a delegate to the Continental Congress in 1788, but did not attend the session. That was also the year of the greatest and most historical thing he ever did: at the New York convention in Poughkeepsie to consider ratifying the United States Constitution, he broke the impasse about whether a Bill of Rights had to be added. In particular, Jones proposed to remove the words "on condition that" a listing of rights would be added, and proposed to insert the words “in full confidence that" a listing of rights would be added; Jones won that battle by 31 votes to 29, which assured both the success of the Constitution as well as the later addition of a Bill of Rights.

Jones was Recorder of New York City from 1789 to 1797, and was a member of the New York State Senate from 1791 to 1799. In 1794, Jones ran for Congress. On February 17, 1797, the office of New York State Comptroller was created by the New York State Legislature to succeed to the State Auditor, Peter T. Curtenius; on March 15 of that year, Jones was appointed by the Council of Appointment as the first holder of the office. Three years later, the state legislature reduced his salary, and the legislature also moved from New York City to Albany; for some combination of those reasons he resigned and returned to his home on Long Island.

== Personal life ==
Jones's first wife was Ellen Turk, who died young. In 1768, he married Cornelia Haring, a daughter of Elizabeth Haring. Together, Samuel and Cornelia were the parents of Samuel Jones (1769–1853), who also served as Recorder of New York City and the Chancellor of New York.

Jones died on November 25, 1819. He left a widow and five sons.

=== Legacy ===
Great Jones Street in New York City's NoHo district was named after Samuel Jones.

== Sources ==
- United States Congress. "Samuel Jones (id: J000251)". Biographical Directory of the United States Congress.

Legal offices
Preceded by Richard Varick	Recorder of New York City; 1789–1797	Succeeded by James Kent
Political offices
Preceded by Peter T. Curtenius as Auditor	New York State Comptroller; 1797–1800	Succeeded by John Vernon Henry
