= Major Jones (disambiguation) =

Major Jones is a retired American basketball player. The name may also refer to:

- Major Thomas Jones
- Francis Jones (historian)
- Major Jones, fictional character in the miniseries XIII: The Conspiracy, adapted from the comic book and played by Lucinda Davis
- Major Jones, fictional minor comic book villain in Marvel 2099
