= Sarah Townsend (disambiguation) =

Sarah Townsend, known professionally as Sarah McGuinness, is a British singer, composer, producer, director, and screenwriter.

Sarah Townsend may also refer to:

- Sarah Townsend (spy), an informant of the Culper Ring
- Sarah Townsend, wife of Buchanan Winthrop

== See also ==
- Sarah, Marchioness Townshend
