= Council Rock =

Council Rock may refer to:

- Council Rock (Cooperstown, New York)
- Council Rock (Oyster Bay, New York)
- Council Rock School District in Bucks County, Pennsylvania.
- Council Rock, New Mexico
