= Henry Townsend (Oyster Bay) =

American settler (c.1649–1703)

- Born: c. 1649; Oyster Bay, New York
- Died: 1703; Oyster Bay, New York
- Spouse: Deborah Underhill
- Children: Uriah Townsend Robert Townsend Elizabeth Townsend
- Parent(s): Henry Townsend and Anne Coles

Henry Townsend (c. 1649–1703) was the son of Henry Townsend, an early settler of the American Colonies.

== Biography ==
Henry Townsend was the son of Henry Townsend who immigrated to the colonies from England. Eventually Henry Townsend settled in Oyster Bay, where his son Henry Townsend was raised. Townsend Society of America DNA testing project has established that the Oyster Bay family is not related to Thomas Townsend of Lynn, MA. The county of origin in England for Henry, John and Richard Townsend is not known.

Henry Townsend married Deborah Underhill in 1677. Deborah Underhill (1659–1698) was daughter of Captain John Underhill (1597–1672), another important figure in Colonial America who trained the militia of the Massachusetts Bay Colony and served as magistrate of Flushing for a brief period of time, before settling on 150 acres (0.61 km^{2}) of land outside of Oyster Bay. Captain Underhill was converted to Quakerism by his second wife, thus making the union of Henry Townsend and Deborah Underhill the combining of two of the most influential Quaker families in Oyster Bay.

They had at least four children together: Robert Townsend (b. 1687), Elizabeth Townsend (1692–1756), Henry (d. 1709) and Uriah Townsend (1698–1767).
