= Thomas Jones (historian) =

Thomas Jones (April 20, 1731 – July 25, 1792) was a lawyer and politician of colonial New York who also wrote a history of New York after being compelled to flee to England.

== Early life ==
Jones was born at Tyrone House in Fort Neck, then in Queens County, now in Nassau County. He was the grandson of Major Thomas Jones, the son of Judge David Jones (1699–1775) and Anna (Willett) Jones (1704–1750), and the first cousin of New York Comptroller Samuel Jones. Thomas graduated A.B. from Yale College in 1750, after which he studied law and was admitted to the bar.

== Career ==
In 1757, he was appointed Clerk of the Court of Common Pleas of Queens County, but left the office the next year.

From 1769 to 1773, he was Recorder of New York City. From 1771 to 1773, he was also Corporation Counsel of New York City. In 1773, he was appointed to the Provincial Supreme Court and held the office until the end of the colonial administration.

Opinion in the colony was sharply divided in 1775 when Massachusetts rebelled against British rule, and Judge Jones came down squarely on the side of loyalty to Crown authority. For his disaffection from the rebellion he was kidnapped and exchanged for Gold Selleck Silliman of opposing opinions.

On October 23, 1779, the New York State Legislature passed an Act of Attainder which included ex-Judge Jones's name. His estate was confiscated, and he was forced to sail with his wife to England, remaining in exile until his death. There he wrote a History of New York During the Revolutionary War and of the Leading Events in the Other Colonies at That Period.

The book supplied details about the battle for Brookland (as he called it or Battle of Long Island) and complained about the generosity of the Treaty of Paris (1783) and consequent mistreatment of Loyalists. Jones singled out for particular attention the evacuation of the village of Hempstead, the recovery of escaped slaves by their Rebel owners, and the abandonment of Britain's Iroquois allies in northern New York. The manuscript lay almost a hundred years on a closet shelf until it was discovered and published.

== Personal life ==
On December 9, 1762, he married Anna DeLancey (1746–1817), daughter of Lt. Gov. James DeLancey, but they had no children.

Jones left the US and died in Hoddesdon, Hertfordshire, England.

== Sources ==
- The Jones Family of Long Island: Descendants of Major Thomas Jones (1665-) by John Henry Jones (pages 86 to 96)

Legal offices
Preceded by Simon Johnson	Recorder of New York City; 1769–1773	Succeeded by Robert R. Livingston
