= Townsend Cemetery =

Cemetery in Oyster Bay, Nassau County, New York

Coordinates: 40°52′11.05″N 73°31′57.16″W

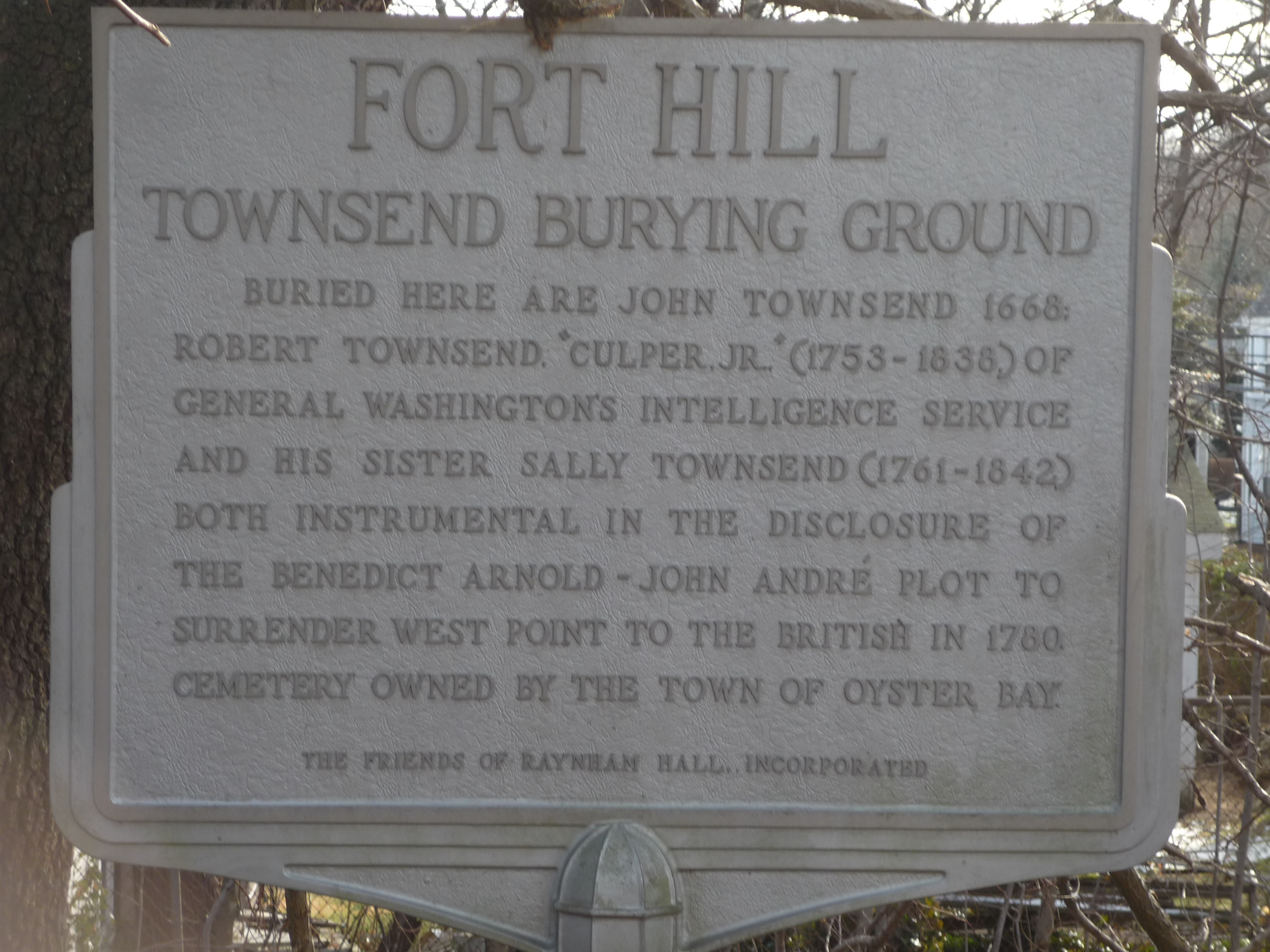
Photo of Townsend Cemetery marker, 2009

The Townsend Cemetery is located atop one of the most distinguished hills surrounding Oyster Bay, New York, USA. Members of the prominent Townsend family, some of whom built and later lived in Raynham Hall, are buried here. An old fort dating from before the Revolutionary War stood on this site.

== History ==
Simcoe Street which leads to Townsend Cemetery was named after a commander of the occupying British forces during the Revolutionary War. Lt. Colonel John Graves Simcoe ordered his troops to cut down the vast apple orchard which once grew here and to rebuild the remains of an old fort which stood on this site.

Nothing of the old fort remains, but the hill still holds a special significance to the Townsends; it is one of their family's early graveyards. The cemetery is now owned by the town and is the final resting place of not only members of the Townsend family, but also the Weeks, Butler, Haviland and Stoddard families. John Townsend is believed to have been the first buried here in 1668. His initialed headstone is greatly worn and weathered but a bronze marker has been added noting his immigration from England and his original ownership of this land. He and his two brothers, Richard and Henry, settled in Oyster Bay in the 1660s and their descendants have been leaders in the community for centuries.

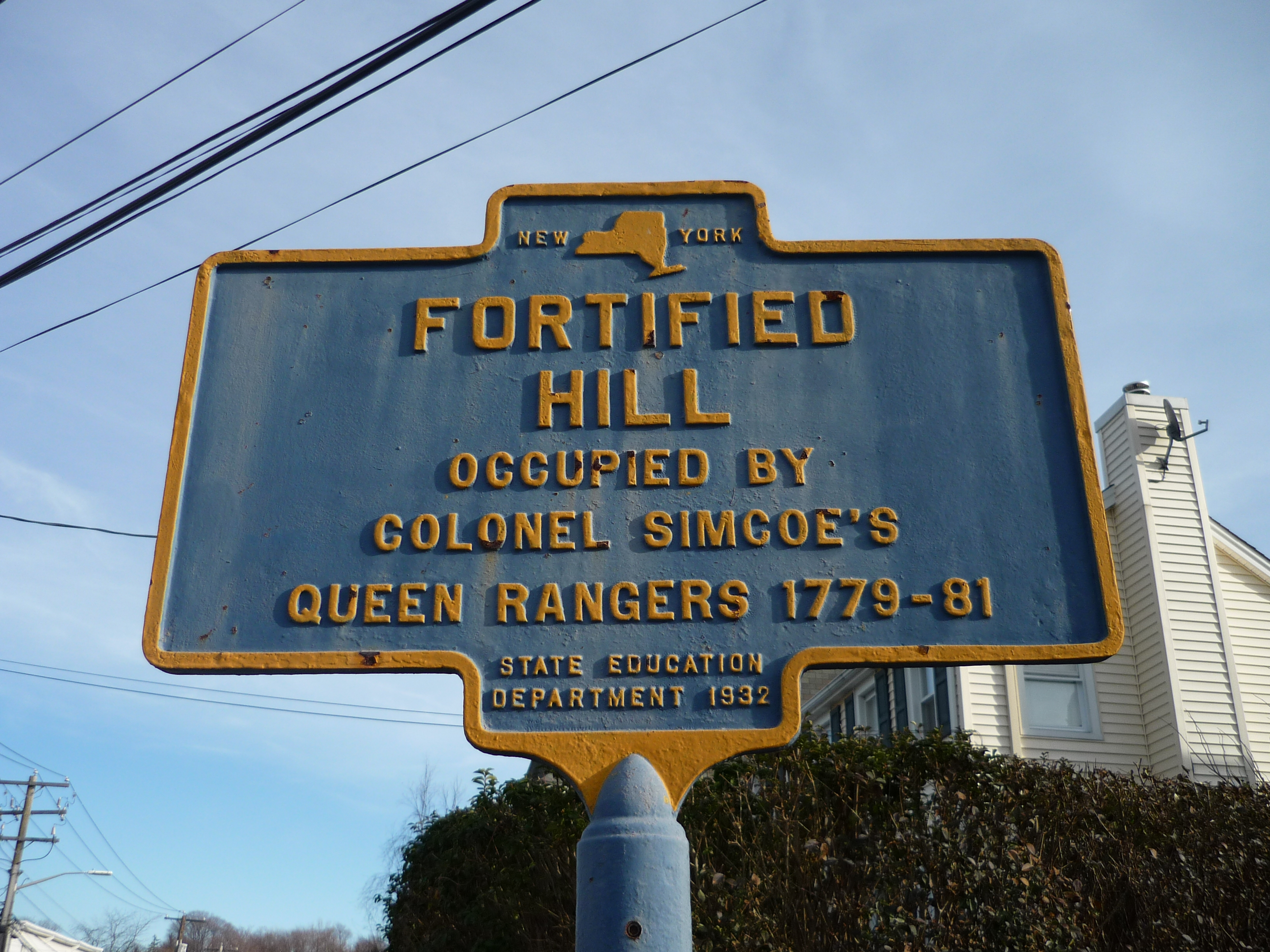
Photo of Oyster Bay Fortified Hill Marker, 2009

Both Samuel and Sarah Townsend, the original owners of Raynham Hall are buried here, as are six of their eight children: Solomon, Robert, Sally, Phebe, David and William. The historic marker commemorates Robert and Sally and makes reference to the Culper Spy Ring, which supplied General George Washington with critical information during the Revolutionary War.

Sixteenth and seventeenth century graveyards dot the landscape of Oyster Bay, some almost invisible. There is one on Orchard Street named after the apple orchard, another on Lexington Avenue on the property of a housing development, a third on Cove Road and yet another near the Mill Pond on Lake Avenue. The names on these fading stones are reminders of the origins of the community and its history.

Those same names often appear as street names as well, such as Weeks Avenue, White Street, Burtis Avenue, Audrey Avenue (named after Audrey Townsend), Feeks Lane, McCoun's Lane, Sugar Tom's Lane, Anstice Street, Underhill Place, Larrabee Avenue and Simcoe Street.

== See also ==
- Oyster Bay History Walk
- List of Town of Oyster Bay Landmarks
- List of New York State Historic Markers, Town of Oyster Bay
- National Register of Historic Places listings in Nassau County, New York
