= Greenwood Farm (Ipswich, Massachusetts) =

Historic farm in Massachusetts, United States

- Paine-Dodge House
- U.S. National Register of Historic Places
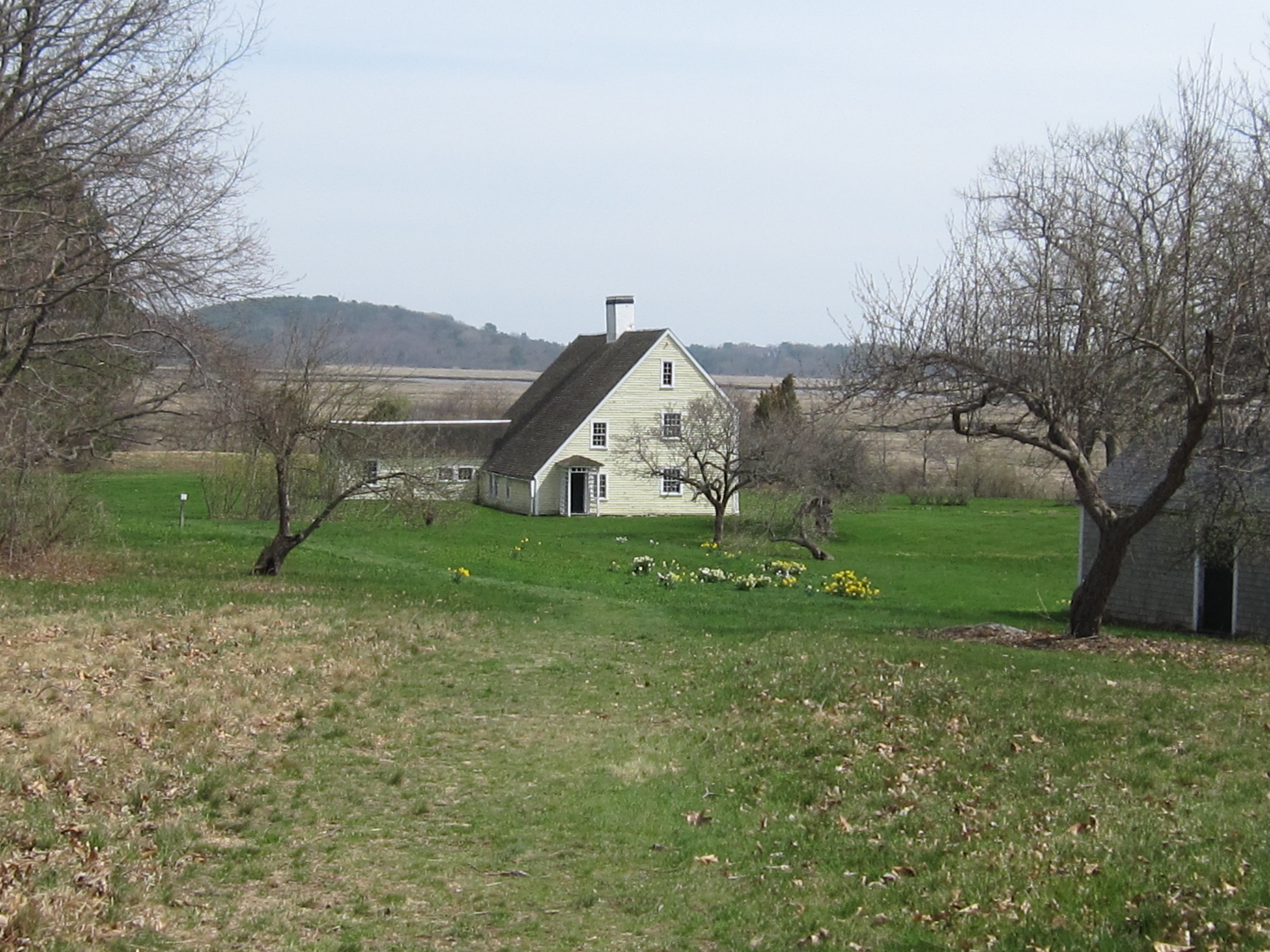
- Paine House at Greenwood Farm

- Location within Massachusetts Location within the United States
- Location: Ipswich, Massachusetts
- Coordinates: 42°41′36″N 70°49′0″W
- Area: 216 acres (87 ha)
- Built: 1694
- Built by: Robert Paine Jr.
- Architectural style: First Period, Saltbox
- MPS: First Period Buildings of Eastern Massachusetts TR
- NRHP reference No.: 90000231
- Added to NRHP: March 9, 1990

Greenwood Farm is a historic property and nature reserve located in Ipswich, Massachusetts, and owned by The Trustees of Reservations. The farm is 216 acres of gardens, pastures, meadows, woodlands and salt marsh and it features the Paine (or Paine-Dodge) House, a First Period farmhouse constructed in 1694.

== Farm history ==
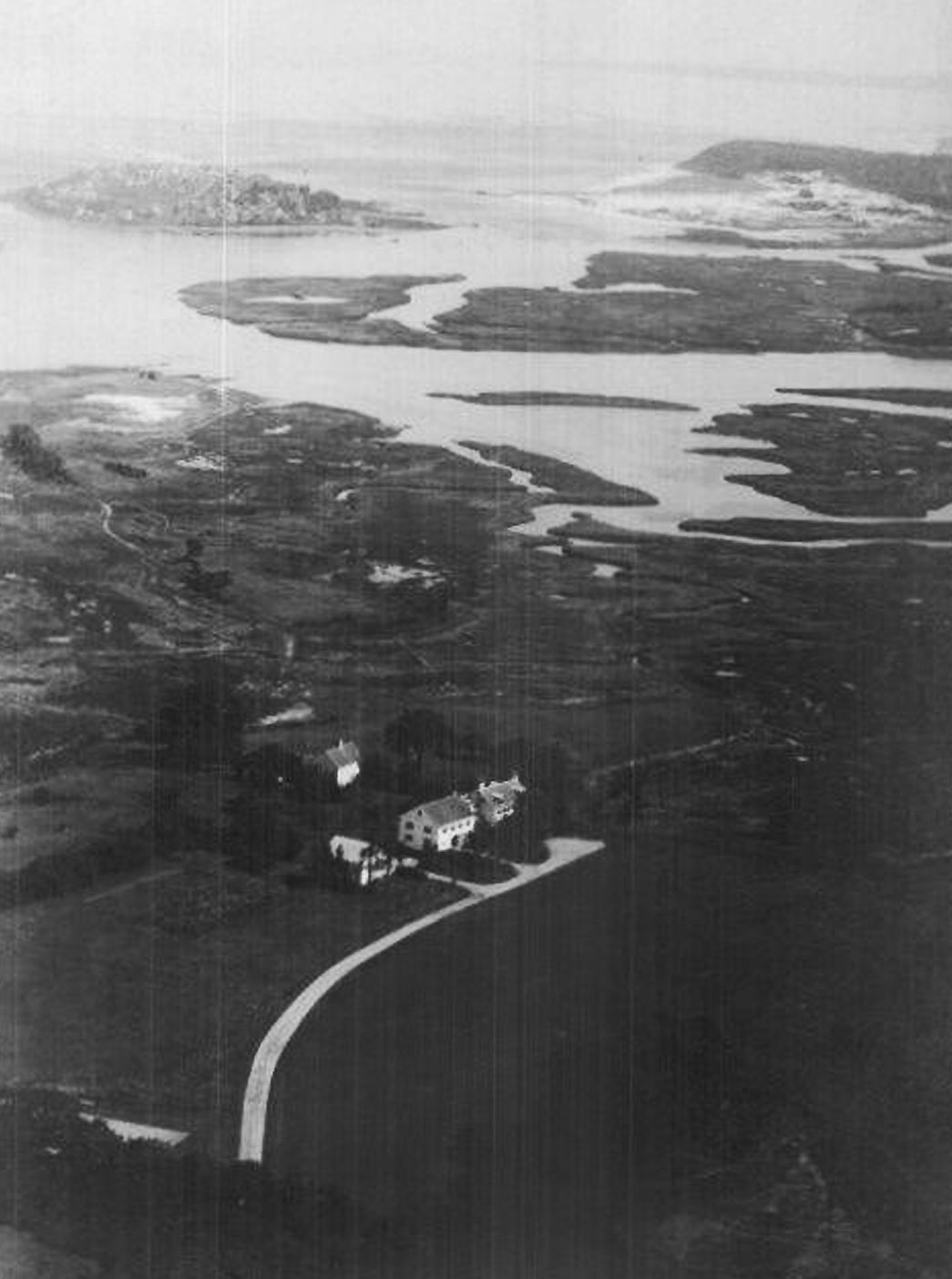
An aerial photo believed to have been taken in 1920 of Greenwood Farm

Greenwood Farm is located on a neck of land in the north part of Ipswich, Massachusetts. The neck, called Great Neck and later Jeffreys Neck, is about 350 acres and is surrounded on three sides by the Eagle Hill River, the Ipswich River, and Plum Island Sound. Prior to its settlement by European colonists, the land was a homeland to the Pawtucket people who called the local village Agawam, which is translated from Algonquin as "beyond" (aga) "the marsh" (wam).

About 1623, Great Neck was purchased from the Pawtucket—presumably from their sagamore named Quonopkonat (better known by his honorific Masquenomoit or Masconomet)—by William Jeffrey (1591–1675) to establish a fishermen's trading post. Jeffrey gave the neck its current name.

In 1633, Robert Coles (c. 1600–1655) was in the first company, led by John Winthrop the Younger, that went to Agawam (now Ipswich, Massachusetts). Coles was granted 200 acres—thought to be the Greenwood Farm land—on Jeffreys Neck north of town. Coles removed to Salem in 1635 and would become an original proprietor of Rhode Island.

By 1639, Robert Paine Sr. (1601–1684) was in Ipswich and in 1640 he received a grant to the farmland. Robert Sr. was the founder of the town's grammar school, a preacher, and Ruling Elder of the First Church.

The farm was conveyed to his son, Robert Paine Jr. (1627–aft. 1703), who built the Paine House in 1694 which still stands. Robert Jr. graduated from Harvard in 1656 and served as foreman of the Salem witch trial jury in 1692.

Robert Paine Jr.'s son, Robert Paine 3rd (1670–1693), died as a young man, so in 1703 he deeded the Paine House and much of the Paine farmland to Daniel Smith (1705–1744), who lived on a neighboring farm and a year earlier had married his daughter, Elizabeth Paine (1677–1717). After the death of Elizabeth, Daniel Smith married Deborah Willcomb (1688–aft. 1735) and the farm remained in the possession of Smith/Willcomb descendants for five generations.

The farm was acquired by Thomas Smith Greenwood (1807–1883), the first keeper of the Ipswich Lighthouse and son of Ruth Smith (1786–1807), the great granddaughter of Daniel Smith. The farm was passed to his daughter, Pauline Greenwood (1845–1932), who was the last of the Smith descendants to own the farm.

The farm and Paine House were acquired in 1911 by Guy Murchie (1872–1958), a Harvard law graduate and former Roosevelt Rough Rider. In 1916 the farm was purchased by Robert Gray Dodge (1872–1964), a Harvard law graduate and Boston attorney, whose daughters turned it over to the care of the Trustees of Reservations in 1975. After the death of Sally Dodge (1907–1993), a New England Conservatory of Music graduate and violinist, Greenwood Farm was opened to the public.

== Paine House ==
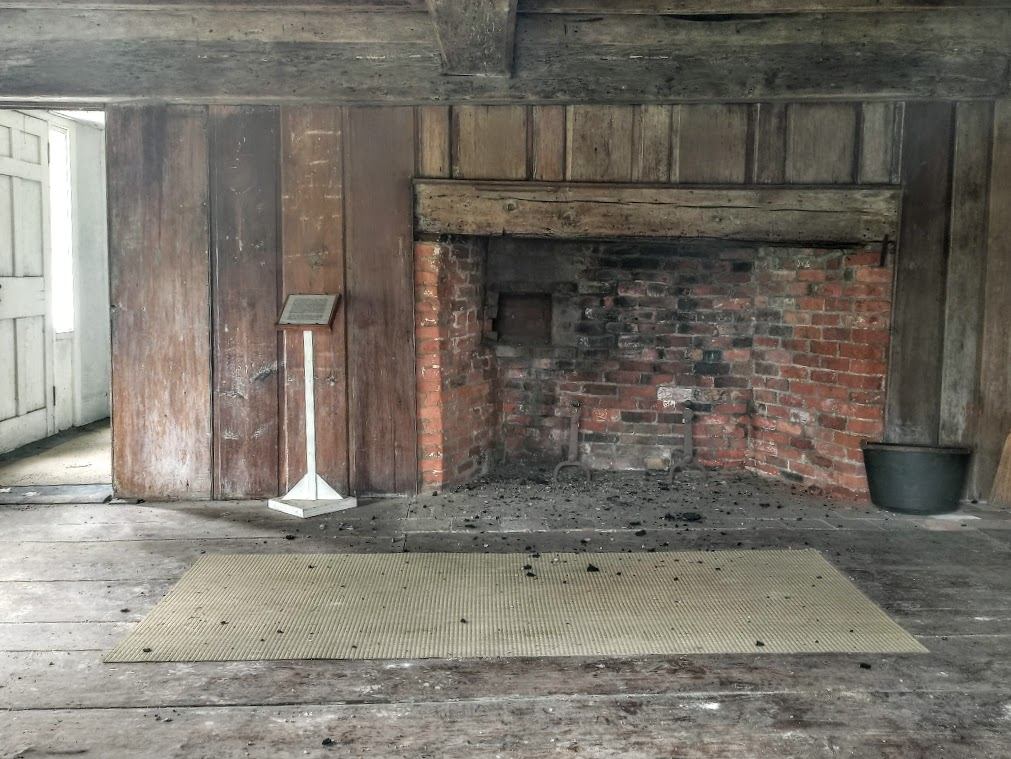
Room in Paine House at Greenwood Farm

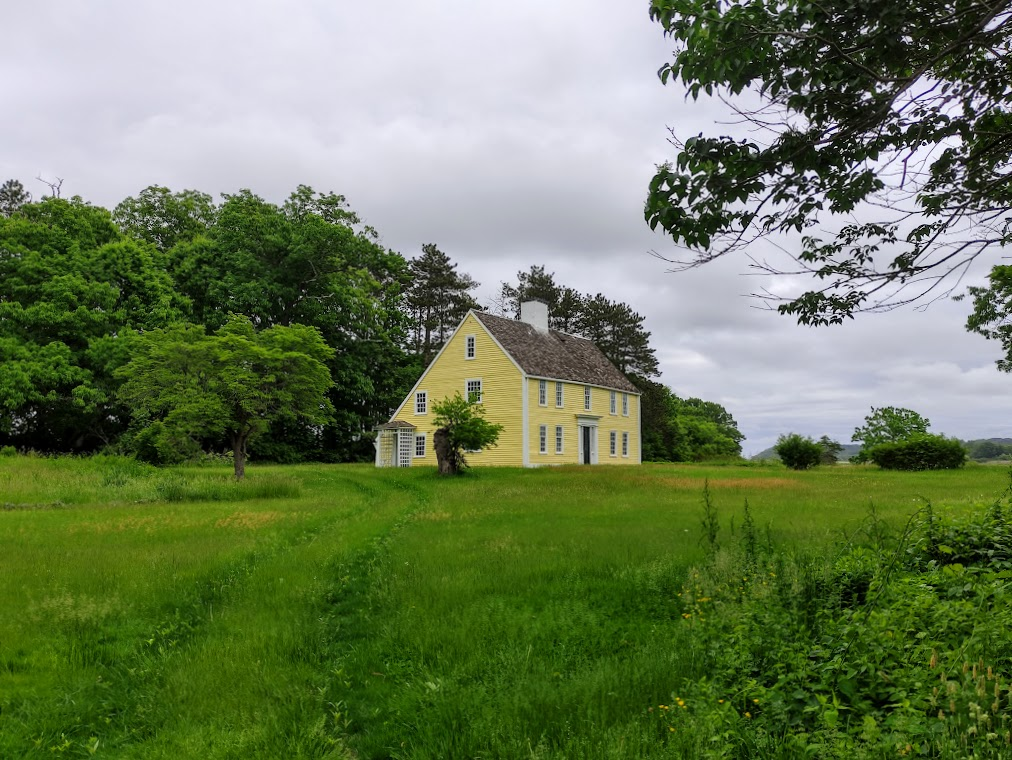
Paine House

The saltbox house built by Robert Paine Jr. stands on its original site and is now a museum owned by The Trustees of Reservations. Once thought to have been built in 1702, a dendrochronological study commissioned in 2002 by the Trustees revealed that it was built in 1694. The Paine House was listed on the National Register of Historic Places in 1990.

Here is a description of the Paine House on the website Historic Ipswich, which is maintained by the town historian, Gordon Harris:

This saltbox was built in 1694, a well-preserved example of First Period architecture. This house uses the principal rafter and purlin system in which multiple purlins span the principal rafters beginning directly above the bay posts, and support vertically laid roofing boards. The method probably evolved from the roof framing of the west of England. Sheathed walls and doors in the Paine house are decorated with shadow moldings created by planes that were run along the outer face of a board at its juncture with another, a relatively rare interior finish. A section of the crawl space basement appears to have served as a dairy. Its interiors are furnished with late 17th–19th-century pieces acquired during the Colonial Revival by former owners Alice and Robert Gray Dodge. The picturesque house remains on its original saltwater farm location.

== See also ==
- National Register of Historic Places listings in Ipswich, Massachusetts
- National Register of Historic Places listings in Essex County, Massachusetts

== Bibliography ==
- Anderson, Robert Charles (2015). The great migration directory : immigrants to New England, 1620–1640 : a concise compendium. Boston, Massachusetts: New England Historic Genealogical Society.
- Austin, John Osborne (1899). The journal of William Jefferay, gentleman. Born at Chiddingly, old England ... 1591; died at Newport, New England ... 1675. Being some account of divers people, places and happenings, chiefly in New England. A diary that might have been. New York Public Library. [Providence, R.I., Press of E. L. Freeman & Sons].
- Felt, Joseph Barlow (1834). History of Ipswich, Essex, and Hamilton. C. Folsom.
- Harris, Gordon (2022). "47 Jeffreys Neck Road, the Paine house (1694)". Historic Ipswich.
- Ipswich (Mass.) (1899). The Ancient Records of the Town of Ipswich: Vol. 1, from 1634 to 1650. G.A. Schofield.
- Ipswich Historical Society (1900). Publications of the Ipswich Historical Society. Vol. 8–15. The Society.
- Lepionka, Mary Ellen (June 7, 2014). "Who Were the Agawam Indians Really?" (PDF). historicipswich.net. Archived from the original (PDF) on October 8, 2021.
- Paine, Albert W. (Albert Ware) (1881). Paine genealogy. Ipswich branch. Including a brief history of the Norman race (to which all families of "Paine" belong) from its origin until the conquest and the crusade in which Hugo de Payen served. University of California Libraries. Bangor, Me. : Printed by O. F. Knowles.
- Paine, Henry D. (1883). Paine Family Records: A Journal of Genealogical and Biographical Information Respecting the American Families of Payne, Paine, Payn &c. Albany, J. Munsell, printer.
- Perley, M. V. B. (1888). The Agawam manual and directory : a summer resort, religious, school and society manual and resident and business directory of the Agawam district : first part, Ipswich, Rowley, and Hamilton. H. Lee M. Pike, Printer. OCLC 4886864.
- Salem Witch Museum (2022). "The 1692 Salem Witch Trials".
- Sargent, William (February 3, 2015). The House on Ipswich Marsh: Exploring the Natural History of New England. University Press of New England. ISBN 978-1-61168-771-2.
- Spieldenner, Sharon (March 2015). "Guide to Greenwood Farm Collection, 1840s-1993 GF.MS.Coll.1" (PDF). thetrustees.access.preservica.com.
- "Sally Dodge, 86; music teacher gave family farm to land group". The Boston Globe. August 6, 1993.
- "ROBERT G. DODGE, LAWYER, 91, DEAD; 'Dean of Massachusetts Bar' Practiced for 67 Years". The New York Times. February 16, 1964. ISSN 0362-4331.
- The Trustees of Reservations (2021). "Greenwood Farm History".
- Waters, Thomas Franklin; Ipswich Historical Society; Goodhue, Sarah; Wise, John (1905). Ipswich in the Massachusetts Bay Colony. Ipswich, Massachusetts: The Ipswich historical society.
- Waters, T. Frank (1912). "Jeffrey's Neck and the Way Leading Thereto". Publications of the Ipswich Historical Society. XVIII. Salem Press Co.
- Willcomb, Oliver Clifton (1902). Genealogy of the Willcomb Family of New England (1665–1902): Together with a Condensed History of the Town of Ipswich, Massachusetts.
- Wilson, Doris H. (1984). Great Neck, Ipswich, Massachusetts: A History (PDF). Rowley, Massachusetts: Defiance Graphics Corp. for The Association of Great Neck, Inc.
