= Captain Thomas Townsend =

Early settler (??–1712)

- Died: 1712
- Known for: Early settler of American colonies
- Spouses: Sarah Coles; Mary Almy
- Children: Temperance; Sylvanus Townsend; John; Freelove; Sarah
- Parents: John Townsend; Elizabeth Montgomery

Captain Thomas Townsend was an early settler of the American Colonies. Captain Townsend was the son of John Townsend and his wife Elizabeth, both early settlers on Long Island.

== Biography ==
John Townsend, Capt. Thomson's father, and his brothers Henry Townsend and Richard Townsend, were in Boston in 1637, from which they moved to Flushing on Long Island. Captain Thomas Townsend, the second son of John, was baptized in the Reformed Dutch Church of New Netherland on 16 Dec 1642 and his sponsors included his uncle Henry Townsend, Rebecca Breton, and Claertje Gerrits.

In 1645, John Townsend received a land patent from Gov. Kieft in Flushing. In 1658, John Townsend moved with his brothers to Oyster Bay, which was beyond the active reach of the Dutch. Here he spent the remainder of his life, and died at Oyster Bay, in 1695.

Captain Thomas Townsend was in Rhode Island after the Dutch and English war, and engaged in trading. Later he went to Oyster Bay where he obtained land and built a house around 1673. He was named a patentee securing title to land in 1677.

Records indicate Thomas resided in Portsmouth, Rhode Island in 1686, where he was chosen sheriff in 1696. At a town meeting at Portsmouth on 4 May 1698, it was found "that whereas Thos. Townsend, late sheriff, did by his neglect let Wm. Downs, a pirate, escape from jail, voted that said Townsend be brot (sic) to trial for said act."

Shortly after this he moved to Tiverton, a new settlement in Massachusetts. In a deed dated July 1702 to his daughter Sarah, then wife of Abraham Underhill, he calls himself "now living in Tiverton, county of Bristol, Province of Mass."

Captain Townsend in his official position as Justice performed marriages, and it is believed he performed the rite between his daughter Freelove and Major Thomas Jones. In 1688, Thomas Townsend bought a piece of land at Souther Oyster Bay from the Massapequa Indians, which he gave it "unto Thomas Jones of Oyster Bay, my son-in-law, and to Freelove his wife, my daughter" in 1695.

== Personal life ==
Captain Townsend married his first wife Sarah, daughter of Robert Coles and Mary Hawxhurst. From this marriage he had his children including:

- Temperance Townsend
- Sylvanus Townsend
- Freelove Townsend (born 29 Dec 1674), who married Major Thomas Jones (c. 1665–1713)
- Sarah Townsend
- John Townsend

Captain Townsend married a second wife, Mary, the widow of Col. Job Almy, and daughter of Christopher and Susannah Unthank, of Warwick, R.I. His second marriage resulted in no offspring.

=== Legacy ===
He is posthumously remembered as being "untiring energy and for many years took an active and leading part in the early matters of Oyster Bay, and in the settlement of the boundary disputes between the towns of Huntington and Oyster Bay, and in the dealings between his townspeople and the Indians the services of our trusty and beloved friend, Thos. Townsend, were indispensable."
