= John Townsend (Oyster Bay) =

English settler (c.1608–1668)

- Born: c. 1608; England, Norfolk Cty
- Died: 1668; Oyster Bay, Long Island, Province of New York
- Spouse: Elizabeth Montgomerie
- Children: John; Thomas; James; Elizabeth; Rose; Ann; Sarah; George; Daniel
- Parent: (unknown)

John Townsend (c. 1608–1668) was an early settler of the American Colonies who emigrated from England before 1642. Townsend was a signatory to the Flushing Remonstrance, a precursor to the United States Constitution's provision on freedom of religion in the Bill of Rights. Because of their persecution by the Dutch authorities of New Amsterdam, he and his brother Henry supported the Quakers, and later generations of this Townsend family joined the movement. They can be found in Friends' records on Long Island, New York, Newport, Rhode Island, Cape May County, New Jersey and around Philadelphia. John Townsend arrived in Oyster Bay in 1661 and he died there in 1668. There is a marker for him in Fort Hill Cemetery in the village of Oyster Bay. Members of his family would go on to be distinguished leaders in the Oyster Bay community, throughout New York State, the mid-Atlantic colonies and wherever they settled in the rest of the United States. The talented and famous furniture makers of Newport, Rhode Island Job, Christopher, John and Edmund descend from him.

== Biography ==
John Townsend was born about 1608 in England, however the names of his parents and the maiden name of his wife Elizabeth are not yet known. The Townsend brothers were not related to Thomas Townsend of Lynn, MA and his family; this man had a son named John born about 1644 and who died in Massachusetts. Nor are they related to the other Townsend families found throughout the colonies prior to the Revolutionary War. Old genealogies often perpetuate this myth but better access to records and YDNA testing have resolved this issue.

John was one of the original settlers of Flushing, having been granted a patent by Gov. Keift in 1645. He and his brothers Henry Townsend and Richard Townsend settled there. Henry Townsend's support for the Quakers created political difficulties with the Dutch governor, Peter Stuyvesant. By 1647/1648 Henry and Richard had moved to Warwick, Rhode Island. John was received as an inhabitant in July 1649. The brothers were very active there serving as jurymen, constables, committeemen and commissioners to the Provincial Assembly. In 1655 all three were listed as freemen.

In 1656 John sold his house and lots in Warwick to his brothers and obtained a patent in Rusdorp (now Jamaica). In 1656 and 1657 Henry sold his property in Warwick and joined John in Jamaica. Richard remained in Warwick until 1666. John and Henry Townsend signed the Flushing Remonstrance which was dated 27 December 1657. Stuyvesant rejected the petition. Henry had continued run-ins with the Dutch, spending time in prison..

In 1661 Henry received the "Mill Grant" in Oyster Bay and John bought a house in December of the same year. They were now out of the jurisdiction of the Dutch. Here John spent the remainder of his life.

It is believed that he was buried at Fort Hill, a Townsend Cemetery in Oyster Bay, New York. A somewhat inaccurate marker placed long after he died reads: "This stone marks the grave of John Townsend who came from England about 1630, and settled in Oyster Bay in 1661. He died in 1668, and was buried here on his own land." John died intestate, so on the "10th day of the fifth month 1671" his widow Elizabeth, in consultation with John Townsend's surviving brothers Henry and Richard and her eldest sons John and Thomas Townsend, partitioned his property to include their younger children. Elizabeth died in 1684 and is also buried at the Townsend Cemetery
