= Council Rock (Oyster Bay, New York) =

Rock woods in Oyster Bay

Coordinates: 40°52′24.6″N 73°32′29″W

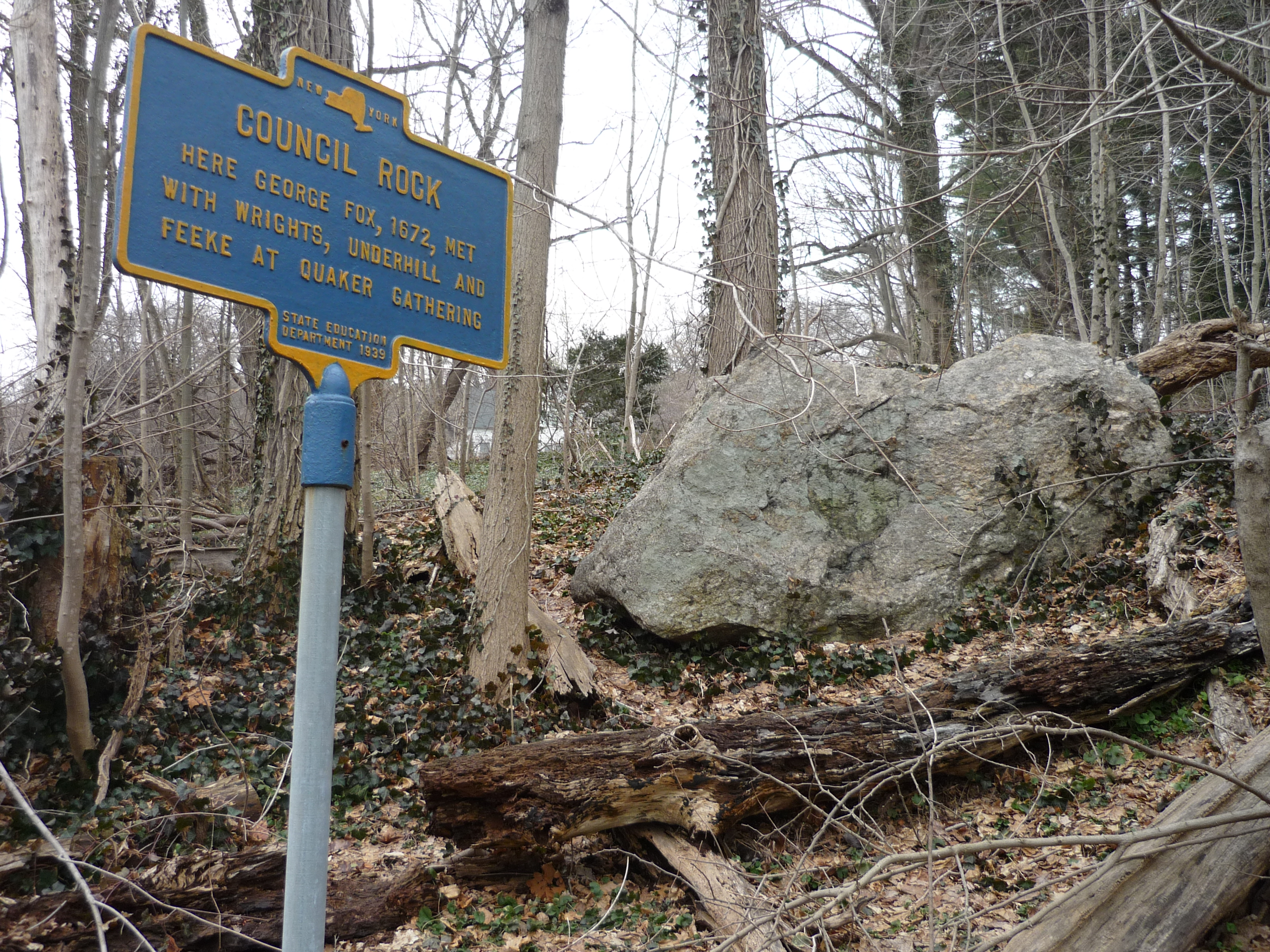
Council Rock in Oyster Bay, New York with New York State Historic Marker to the left.

Council Rock is located on Lake Avenue, a hundred yards south of West Main Street in Oyster Bay, New York. It was a Matinecock meeting ground and the location of a sacred council fire. In 1672, George Fox, the founder of the Religious Society of Friends (Quakers), gave a sermon there during his visit to America.

== History ==
George Fox was an English Dissenter and a founder of the Religious Society of Friends, commonly known as the Quakers or Friends. He rebelled against religious and political consensus by proposing an unusual and uncompromising approach to the Christian faith. He toured Britain for many years as a preacher, for which he was often persecuted by the authorities who disapproved of his beliefs. His ministry expanded and included tours of North America and the Low Countries, between which he was imprisoned for a year.

During this tour of North America, George Fox landed in Barbados on 3 October 1671 and made his way northward through Maryland, before returning to England in June 1673. It was during this time in 1672 that he visited Oyster Bay.

George Fox described his visit to Oyster Bay and Long Island in some detail in his Journal, later published after his death. An excerpt from this follows:

Then we crossed the Sound, all very wet, and much difficulty we had to get to land, the wind being strong against us. But blessed be the Lord God of heaven and earth, and of the seas and waters, all was well. We got safe to Oyster-bay, in Long-Island, the seventh of the sixth month (1672), very early in the morning, which, they say, is about two hundred miles from Rhode-Island. At Oyster-bay we had a very large meeting... From Oyster-bay, we passed about thirty miles to Flushing, where we had a very large meeting, many hundreds of people being there; some of whom came about thirty miles to it. A glorious and heavenly meeting it was (praised be the Lord God!) and the people were much satisfied.

Fox met with notable Oyster Bay families at Council Rock, including the Wrights, Underhills, and Feekes at Quaker Gatherings. In 1939, the New York State Education Department erected a historic marker at this site. Due east of the Council Rock is a cemetery including members of families that were there the day George Fox visited, including the Townsends.

Those in attendance are likely to have included:

- Captain John Underhill (1597-1672) and his wife Elizabeth Feake
- Henry Townsend (1626-1695)

== See also ==
- Oyster Bay History Walk
- List of Town of Oyster Bay Landmarks
- List of New York State Historic Markers, Town of Oyster Bay
- National Register of Historic Places listings in Nassau County, New York
