= Sarah Townsend (spy) =

American spy

- Born: c. 1760; Oyster Bay, New York
- Died: 1842; Oyster Bay, New York
- Other name: Sally Townsend
- Known for: Informant for the Culper Ring
- Parents: Samuel Townsend (1717-1790) (father); Sarah Stoddard (1724-1800) (mother)

Sarah "Sally" Townsend (c.1760–1842) was thought to be an informant for George Washington's Culper Ring, a spy ring founded in the summer of 1778. Townsend lived in Oyster Bay and passed information to her brother, Robert Townsend, a main member of the ring. She died in December 1842 and is buried at the Townsend Cemetery.

== The Culper Spy Ring ==
The Culper Spy Ring was assembled in 1778 by Major Benjamin Tallmadge on orders of George Washington. The ring was to be formed inside New York City, the site of British intelligence headquarters. Townsend's brother Robert was recruited to gather intelligence inside the city under the alias "Culper Jr." Washington placed special emphasis on the true identities of agents remaining secret and using aliases, and none were able to meet him in person. This was designed to avoid spies being captured and hung, as Nathan Hale was two years prior to the ring's formation. British officers were stationed at the Townsend home including John Graves Simcoe of the Queen's Rangers, who was often visited by the British army's Adjutant General, John Andre. According to legend, Sarah told Robert about how she overheard Simcoe and André discussing plans to capture West Point thanks to Benedict Arnold's treachery. This information through Robert was sent to Tallmadge's agents, and led to André's capture. André was captured on Westchester County's Neutral Ground, carrying documents with the plans to capture West Point, and was soon hanged.

== Courtship ==
Simcoe courted Townsend for a time and declared his love for her in 1779 in America's first known valentine. In it he asks her to choose him as her valentine. An excerpt reads,

"Say, must I all my joys forego and still maintain this outward show? / Say, shall this breast that’s pained to feel be ever clad in horrid steel? / Nor swell with other joys than those of conquest o’er unworthy foes? / Shall no fair maid with equal fire awake the flames of soft desire: / My bosom born, for transport, burn and raise my thoughts from Delia’s urn? / “Fond Youth,” the God of Love replies, “Your answer take from Sarah’s eyes.”

Townsend, who was about 18 at the time of this proposal, did not choose Simcoe to be her valentine, likely due to greatly differing political sentiments, however it is believed the two had a brief flirtation. The theme of the lengthy valentine revolves around the difficulty of loving an enemy. Townsend was never married, and it is said that the valentine was found among her possessions after her death. The Raynham Hall Museum features a preserved windowpane where a British officer scratched a message to "The adorable Miss Sally Townsend".

== Personal life ==
Townsend was the seventh of eight children born to Samuel and Sarah Townsend in Oyster Bay. Her father was a Quaker and her mother was an Episcopalian. She never married and grew old with her brother, Robert and her sister Phebe and died in 1842. The home in which she lived in Oyster Bay is now the Raynham Hall Museum. According to Rose, her nephew Peter drew a sketch of her at age 65, where she shows significant similarities to her brother such as a slim long nose, a firm chin, and small, round glasses.
