= Thomas Jones (privateer) =

Irish emigrant to New England and privateer

Major Thomas Jones
- Born: c. 1665; Ireland
- Died: 1713; Long Island, Province of New York
- Known for: Early settler of American colonies
- Spouse: Freelove Townsend
- Relatives: Thomas Jones (historian) (grandson)

Thomas Jones (c. 1665 – 13 December 1713) emigrated from Strabane, Ireland, to Rhode Island. There he married Freelove Townsend, daughter of Captain Thomas Townsend, and went on to serve as a privateer. He later became an influential figure on Long Island.

== History ==
Thomas Jones was born about 1665. He fought in the Battle of the Boyne, Aghrim, and at the capitulation of Limerick, serving under William III of England and under James II of Ireland. For this service he attained the rank of major.

He emigrated to America where he met and married Freelove Townsend, daughter of Captain Thomas Townsend, while in Warwick, Rhode Island. After that he was outfitted as a privateer and absent for three years, during which time he made many captures. His father-in-law, Captain Thomas Townsend, moved to Oyster Bay with his daughter Freelove.

Freelove Townsend was a woman of great intelligence and ability. Following her husband's death, management of his estates was given over to her, as well as the education of their children. She was baptized in 1702 by the famous George Keith and the Rev. John Thomas, who were sent by the Society for the Propagation of the Gospel in Foreign Parts.

In 1688, Captain Thomas Townsend had bought from the Massapequa Indians a piece of land at South Oyster Bay, which he gave in 1695 "unto Thomas Jones of Oyster Bay, my son-in-law, and to Freelove his wife, my daughter". In 1696, Jones built the first house of bricks so far east on Long Island.

Jones was admitted an associate freeholder under the original patent of Oyster Bay, granted by Governor Andros, on 29 September 1677. Lord Cornbury, the Governor of New York, commissioned him to be Captain of Militia in Queens County on 20 October 1702. Two years later, on 14 October 1704, he was appointed High Sheriff of Queens and, on 3 April 1706, was made Major of the Queens County Regiment. Hunter appointed Jones the "Ranger General of the Island of Nassau", the legal name then referring to Long Island. This commission started on 4 September 1710 and made him an officer of the Crown, with "Royal rights" or franchises of waifs, estrays, hunting, royal fish, treasure trove, mines, deodands, forfeitures, and the like.

Jones died on 13 December 1713 and was buried on a slight elevation on the left bank of the Massapequa. His tombstone, made of hard red sandstone of Rhode Island, bore an inscription written by himself (with original spelling preserved):

Here Lyes Interred The Body of
Major Thomas Jones, who came from
Strabane, in the Kingdom of Ireland,
Settled here, and Died, December, 1713.
From distant Lands to this Wild Waste he came,
This Seat he chose, and here he fix'd his Name.
Long May his Sons this Peaceful Spot Injoy,
And no Ill Fate his Offspring here Annoy.

== Famous descendants ==
Judge David Jones, son of Jones and Freelove Townsend, was born on 16 September 1699. He became judge of Queens County in 1734, and in 1763 was the 2nd Justice of the Supreme Court of New York, where he sat for ten years.

Judge, loyalist and historian Thomas Jones (1731–1792) was the son of David Jones and Anna Willet. He was born on 30 April 1731 at his father's house in Fort Neck. He became Recorder of the City of New York and Judge of the Supreme Court, which later office he held until the close of the Revolutionary War, when he was forced to leave the country for England. There, he wrote his History of New York During the Revolutionary War, which recounts how during the Revolutionary War, a party of rebels from New England broke into and plundered his house at Fort Neck in November 1779.

== Namesakes ==
Jones Beach State Park on Long Island is named after Jones.
