= Henry Townsend (Norwich) =

Early settler of the American Colonies

- Born: 1610-15
- Died: 1695; Oyster Bay, Long Island, Province of New York
- Known for: Early settler of American colonies, signatory to the Flushing Remonstrance
- Spouse: Ann Coles
- Children: 7, including Rose, Henry
- Parent: unknown
- Relatives: John Townsend (brother)

Henry Townsend (abt 1610/15–1695) was an early settler of the American Colonies.

== Early life ==
Henry Townsend (1610/15-1695) was born to unknown parents. The location has yet to be identified. YDNA testing at the FamilyTree DNA Townsend Project on male descendants of both the Oyster Bay Townsends and Thomas Townsend (1694/5-1677) of Lynn, MA has conclusively proven there is no relationship between the two families. This long held and incorrect assumption that Thomas, barely 13 years older than the oldest brother John, was based on no evidence. John Townsend (abt 1608–1668) was the older brother of Henry and one of the original settlers of Flushing. Henry's younger brother was Richard Townsend (abt 1620–1670).

== Career ==
Townsend settled in Flushing, where his brother John Townsend was granted a patent by Gov. Willem Kieft in 1645. Due to political difficulties with the Dutch governor, Peter Stuyvesant, the Townsend brothers moved to Warwick, Rhode Island.

In 1656, Townsend and his brothers, John and Richard, again attempted to settle in Long Island, this time obtaining the patent of Rustdorp (now Jamaica). The following year in 1657, he was arrested, imprisoned and fined. Records from 15 September 1657 show Henry Townsend was asked to pay £8 Flanders or depart the Dutch province within six weeks, "upon the penalty of corporeal punishment." His penalty was handed out due to his practice of allowing meetings of Quakers in his house, which Stuyvesant had outlawed by banning the practice of all religious activity outside of the Dutch Reformed Church.

Later a petition, known as the Flushing Remonstrance was signed by Henry, his brother John and many others on 27 December 1657. Stuyvesant rejected the petition. Henry Townsend was arrested, imprisoned and fined £8 Flanders for harboring Quakers in his house.

In the following year, 1658, Townsend moved with his brothers to Oyster Bay, which was out of the jurisdiction of the Dutch. Here he spent the remainder of his life.

== Personal life ==
In 1649, Henry Townsend married Ann Coles, with whom he had seven children:

- Rose Townsend (1648-1720), who fed her father through the bars of the window while imprisoned by the Dutch government; married Captain Joseph Dickenson.
- Henry Townsend (1649-1703), who married Deborah Underhill in 1677. Deborah Underhill (1659-1698) was daughter of Captain John Underhill (1597-1672), another important figure in Colonial America who trained the militia of the Massachusetts Bay Colony and served as magistrate of Flushing for a brief period of time, before settling on 150 acres (0.61 km^{2}) of land outside of Oyster Bay. Captain Underhill was converted to Quakerism by his second wife, thus making the union of Henry Townsend and Deborah Underhill the combining of two of the most influential Quaker families in Oyster Bay.
- John Townsend (1653-1705)
- Susanna Townsend, who married Aaron Forman, Jr. and had sons Aaron and Jacob.
- Mary Townsend, who married John Wright, son of Nicholas Wright, and had Rose, Eliphal, and Mary.
- Elizabeth Townsend (d. 1680), who died unmarried.
- Robert Townsend (1667-1687), who bought land on Long Island from the Indians

Townsend died at Oyster Bay in 1695.

=== Descendants ===
Henry Townsend (1670-1709) was the son of Henry Townsend and Deborah Underhill. He bought the mill his grandfather had built from his uncle John Townsend, and when his Uncle John died, he was elected town surveyor, being the third generation in direct descent engaged in surveying and to operate the mill. He married Eliphal Wright, daughter of his aunt Mary Townsend and John Wright.
