= House at 199 Prospect Avenue =

Historic house in New York, United States

- U.S. National Register of Historic Places
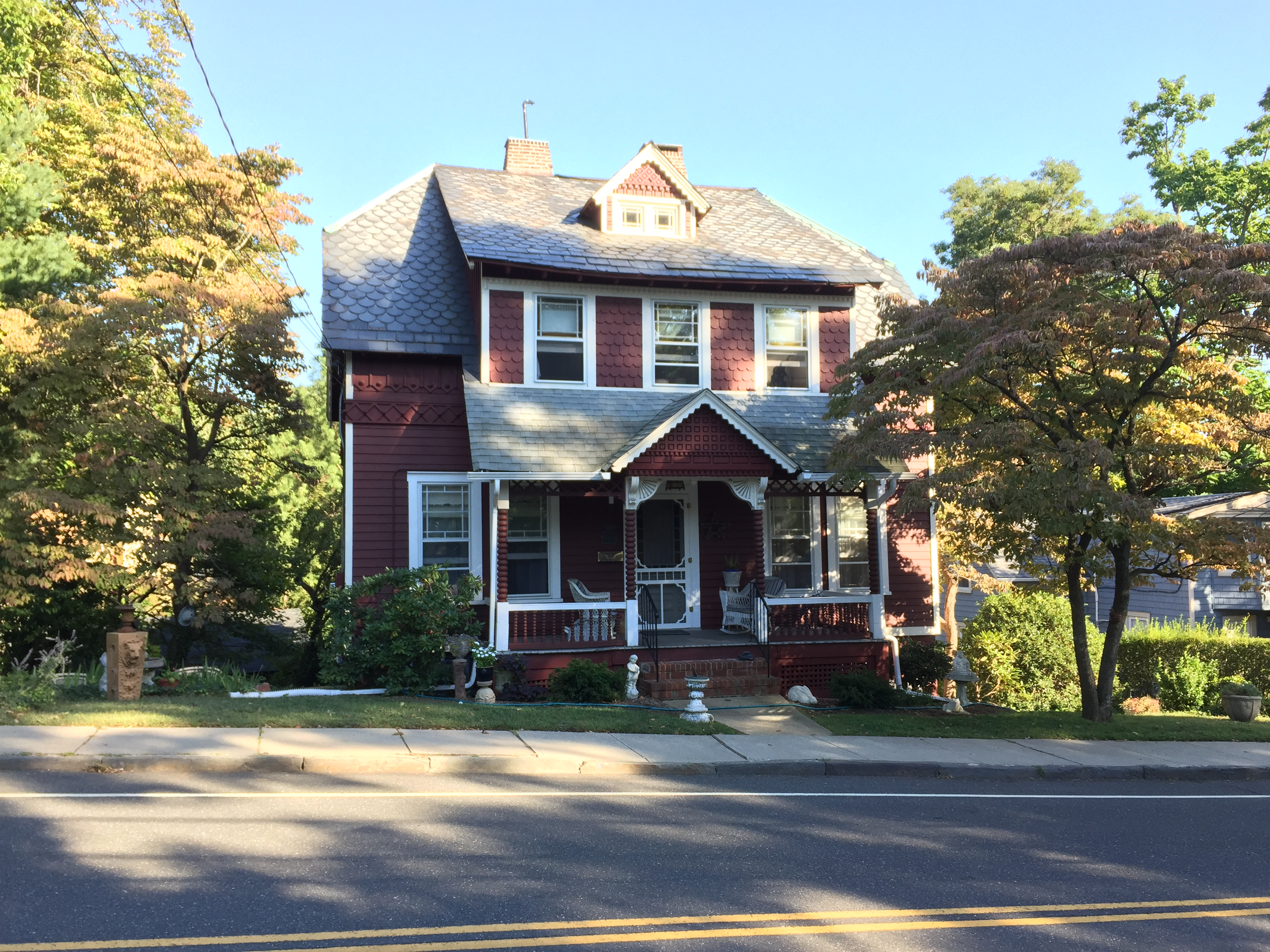

- Location within New York Location within the United States
- Location: 199 Prospect Ave., Sea Cliff, New York
- Coordinates: 40°50′49″N 73°39′4″W
- Area: less than one acre
- Built: 1890
- Architectural style: Late Victorian
- MPS: Sea Cliff Summer Resort TR
- NRHP reference No.: 88000008
- Added to NRHP: February 18, 1988

House at 199 Prospect Avenue is a historic home located at Sea Cliff in Nassau County, New York. It was built about 1890 and is a two-story house with decorative slate jerkinhead roof in the Late Victorian style. It features a three bay shed roof dormer that forms the second floor and covers the entrance porch. It is identical to the House at 195 Prospect Avenue.

It was listed on the National Register of Historic Places in 1988. It was included in a study covering the Sea Cliff Summer Resort area as a "Thematic Group".
