= List of St. Mark's School (Massachusetts) alumni =

The following is a list of famous and notable former students of St. Mark's School of Southborough, Massachusetts.

== A ==
- Charles Francis Adams IV, businessman and philanthropist associated with Woods Hole Oceanographic Institute
- Samuel A. Adams, '51, crusading CIA official who exposed bad Vietnam intelligence of Defense Department
- Matthew Tobin Anderson '86, writer, winner of National Book Award
- A. Watson Armour III, businessman and philanthropist

== B ==
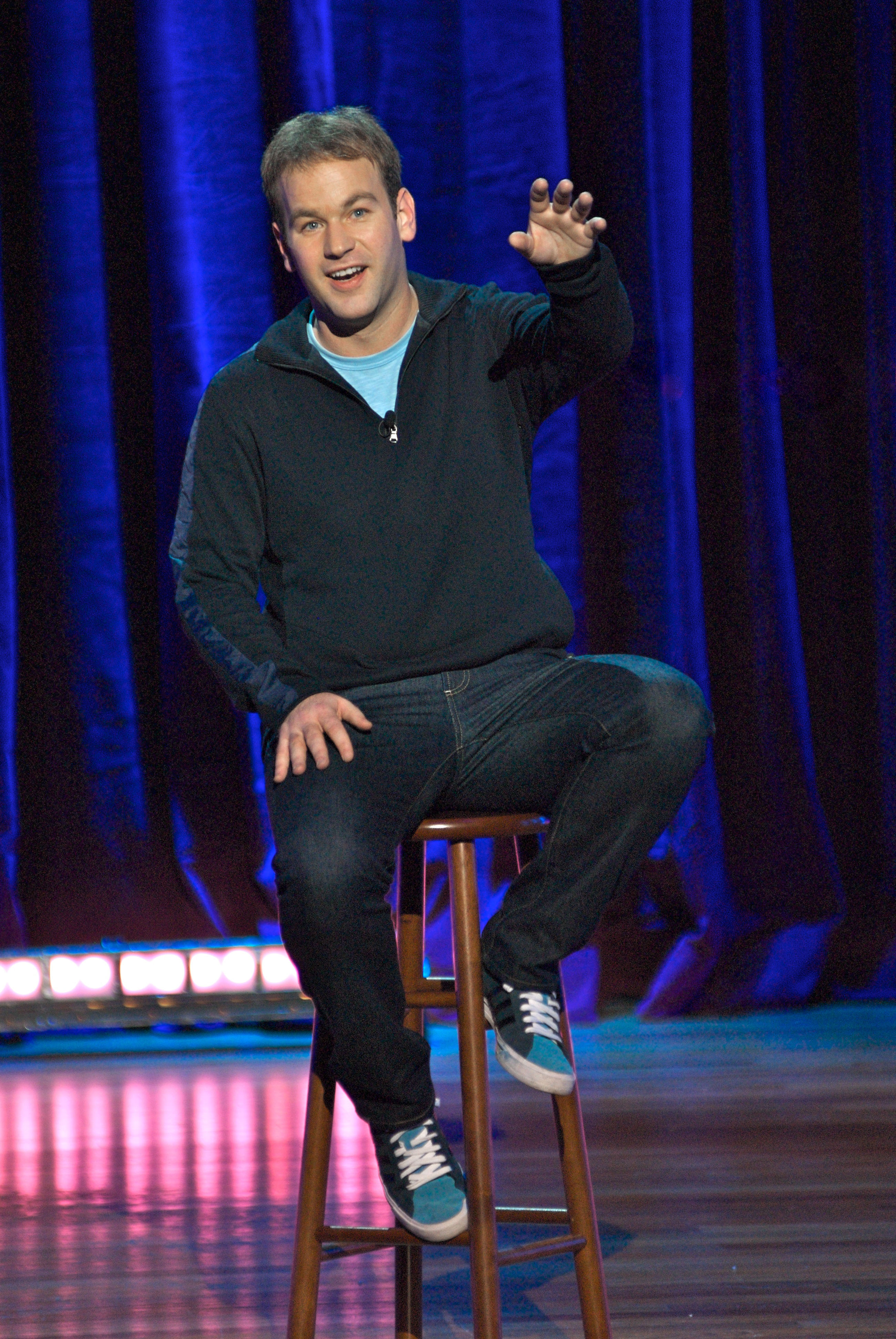
Mike Birbiglia

- Charles L. Bartlett, 1956 winner of the Pulitzer Prize for National Reporting
- Melsahn Basabe, basketball player
- Walter Van Rensselaer Berry, lawyer, friend and mentor of Edith Wharton
- Mike Birbiglia, comedian, class of 1996
- Ben Bradlee, former editor, The Washington Post
- Nicholas F. Brady, U.S. treasury secretary (1988–93); New Jersey senator (1982)
- Nicholas Braun, actor
- John Leslie Breck, class of 1877, friend of Claude Monet who introduced Impressionism to the United States
- Doug Brown, former National Hockey League player
- Greg Brown, former National Hockey League player, current head coach of Boston College Eagles men's ice hockey
- Edward Burnett, U.S. representative from Massachusetts

== C ==
- Wayne Chatfield-Taylor, president of the Export-Import Bank, undersecretary of commerce
- Gregory R. Ciottone, Harvard professor, White House consultant, president emeritus of the World Association for Disaster and Emergency Medicine, pioneering physician in counter-terrorism medicine
- Blair Clark, journalist, former general manager of CBS News
- Nick Clements, theoretical linguist specializing in phonology, notably with CNRS in Paris
- Ernest Amory Codman, pioneering surgeon who made contributions to a variety of specialties and the study of medical outcomes
- William G. Congdon, representationalist painter who used abstract expressionism techniques
- Harry Crosby, poet and founder of the Black Sun Press

== D ==
- J. Richardson Dilworth, former Yale trustee and benefactor of Yale University
- Peter Hoyt Dominick, U.S. congressman, then senator for Colorado; US ambassador to Switzerland
- Wickliffe Draper, American political activist and eugenicist

== E ==
- Kenward Elmslie, lyricist, librettist, and playwright

== F ==
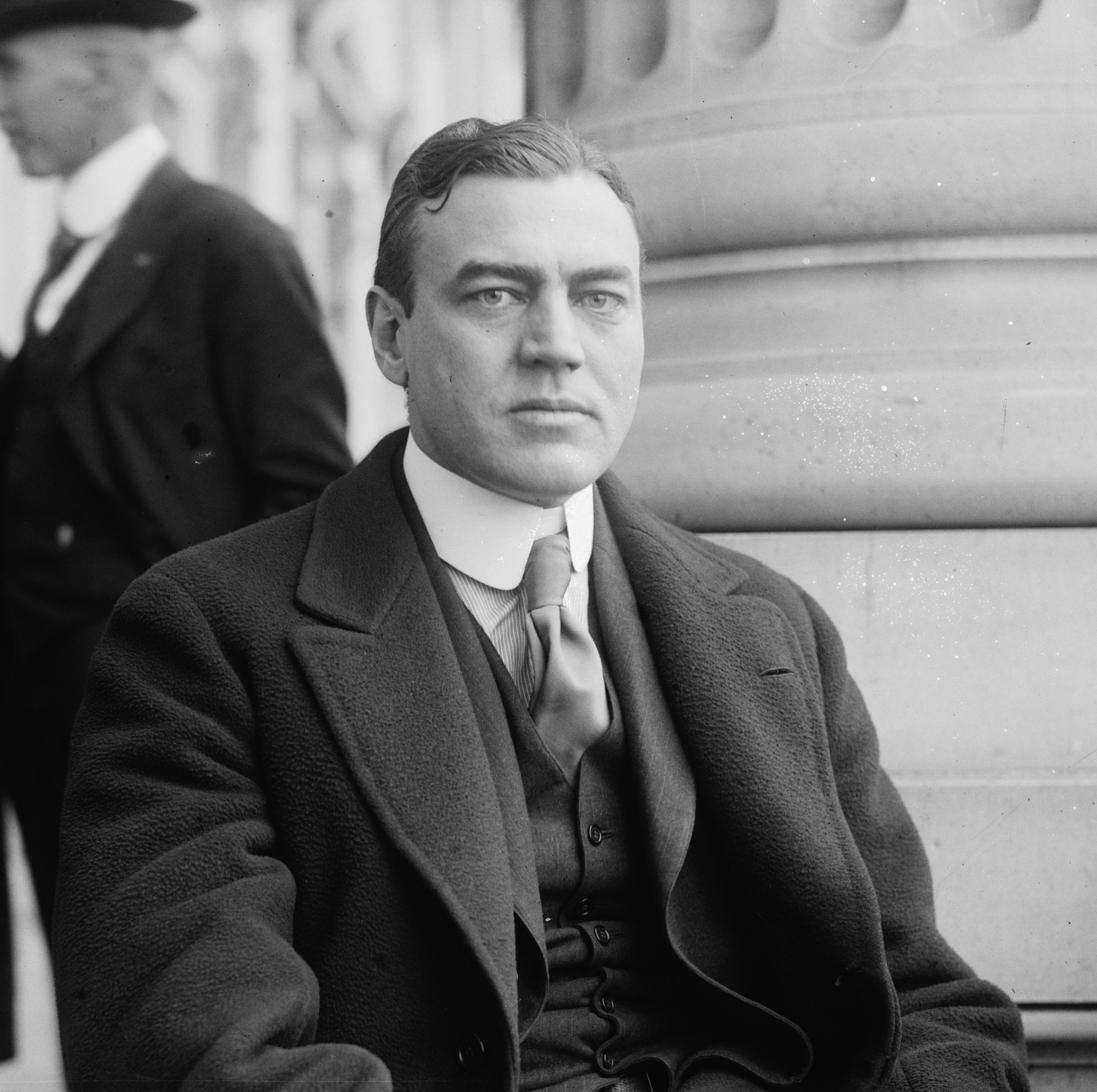
Hamilton Fish III

- Hamilton Fish III, U.S. congressman from New York, 1920–1945; elected to College Football Hall of Fame
- Hamilton Fish V, publisher, politician and philanthropist
- Christopher Forbes, publisher, vice-chairman of Forbes Inc.
- Peter Hood Ballantine Frelinghuysen, Jr., U.S. representative from New Jersey 1953–1975
- Rodney P. Frelinghuysen, U.S. representative from New Jersey 1995–2019

== G ==
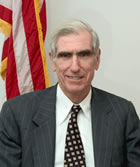
C.Boyden Gray

- Stephen Galatti, visionary director general of the American Field Service and educational pioneer
- David Gardner, founder of the Motley Fool
- C. Boyden Gray, White House counsel to President George H. W. Bush; U.S. envoy to the European Union

== H ==
- Michael N. Hall, molecular biologist
- Mason Hammond, Harvard University classicist and Harvard historian
- Truxtun Hare, Olympic athlete; elected to College Football Hall of Fame
- Prince Hashim Al Hussein, of Jordan
- Hal Haskell, U.S. representative from Delaware and former president of Abercrombie and Fitch
- Ingolv Helland, portrait artist

== I ==
- John Jay Iselin, former president, The Cooper Union in New York City

== K ==
- Robert Winthrop Kean, U.S. representative from New Jersey 1938–1959
- Thomas Kean, former New Jersey governor; former chairman of the 9/11 Commission; former president of Drew University
- John Marshall Kernochan, IPR pioneer; founder of Columbia Law School's Kernochan Center for Law, Media, and the Arts
- William A. Knowlton, four-star general, former superintendent of West Point

== L ==
- Storm Large, musician; her father Henry spent 45 years teaching history and coaching football and baseball at the school before his retirement in 2010
- Frederick Lippitt, Rhode Island lawyer, politician, public servant and philanthropist
- Robert Lowell, poet

== M ==
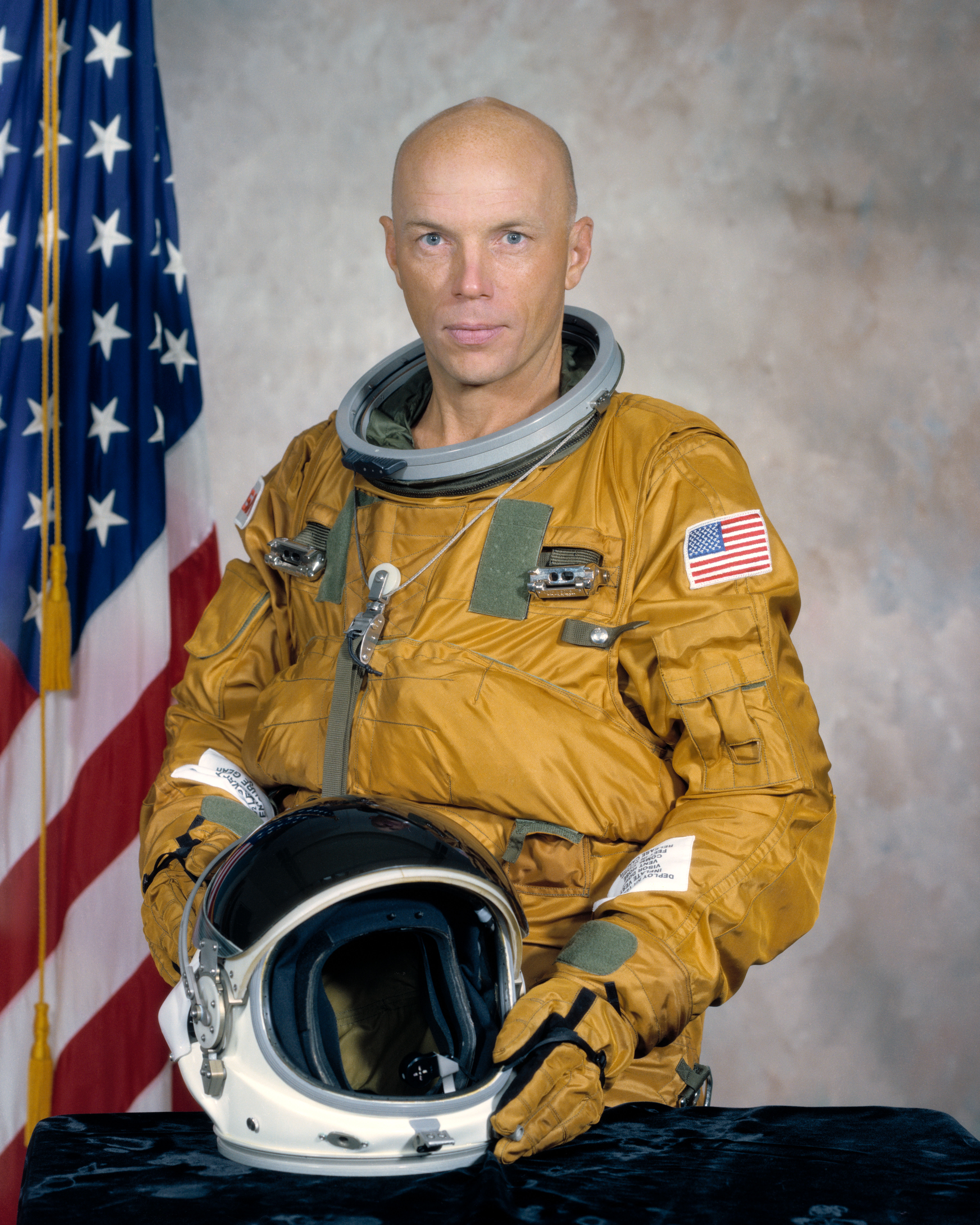
Story Musgrave (M.D.), NASA astronaut

- Robert McC. Marsh (1878–1958), lawyer, politician, and judge
- Samuel Livingston Mather II, Ohio industrialist, philanthropist, and benefactor of Kenyon College
- Lansing McVickar, career officer with the United States Army
- Mark Mulvoy, sports journalist and writer for The Boston Globe and Sports Illustrated
- Story Musgrave, astronaut

== N ==
- Dmitri Nabokov, son and translator of Vladimir Nabokov
- Jordon Nardino, television writer
- Eugene Nickerson, federal judge and Nassau County, New York politician
- John H. Noseworthy, CEO and president of Mayo Clinic Health System

== P ==
- Robert William Packwood, senator from Oregon 1969–1999
- G. Willing "Wing" Pepper, Philadelphia businessman and philanthropist
- Sheffield Phelps, Seattle philanthropist and arts patron
- William Stone Post, architect
- Joseph Pulitzer III, publisher
- Ralph Pulitzer, publisher
- George Putnam III '69, 1990 USA Today's investor of the year; trustee for The Putnam Companies

== R ==
- Franklin Delano Roosevelt III, economist
- George Emlen Roosevelt, financier and philanthropist
- William Donner Roosevelt, investment banker and philanthropist
- Emily Rutherfurd, television actress

== S ==
- Stephen "Laddie" Sanford, international polo player
- John Sargent, former president and CEO of publisher Doubleday and Company
- Eugene Lytton Scott, tennis player; member of International Tennis Hall of Fame, founder of the magazine Tennis Week
- John Sculley, former president of PepsiCo and former CEO of Apple Computer
- John W. Sears, Massachusetts Metropolitan District commissioner
- Mason Sears, member of the Massachusetts General Court, chairman of the Massachusetts Republican Party, and United States representative to United Nations Trusteeship Council
- John Simpkins, representative from Massachusetts, 1895–1898
- Nik Stauskas, professional basketball player (Sacramento Kings)

== T ==
- Kaleb Tarczewski, basketball player
- Robert H. Thayer, New York lawyer, diplomat, and intelligence officer
- Sigourney Thayer, theatrical producer, World War I aviator and poet
- Henry Thrun, current defenseman for the San Jose Sharks
- Herbert Sears Tuckerman, former Massachusetts state representative and senator
- Harrison Tweed, New York lawyer and bar association officer

== V ==
- Harold Stirling Vanderbilt, railroad executive, champion yachtsman and champion bridge player

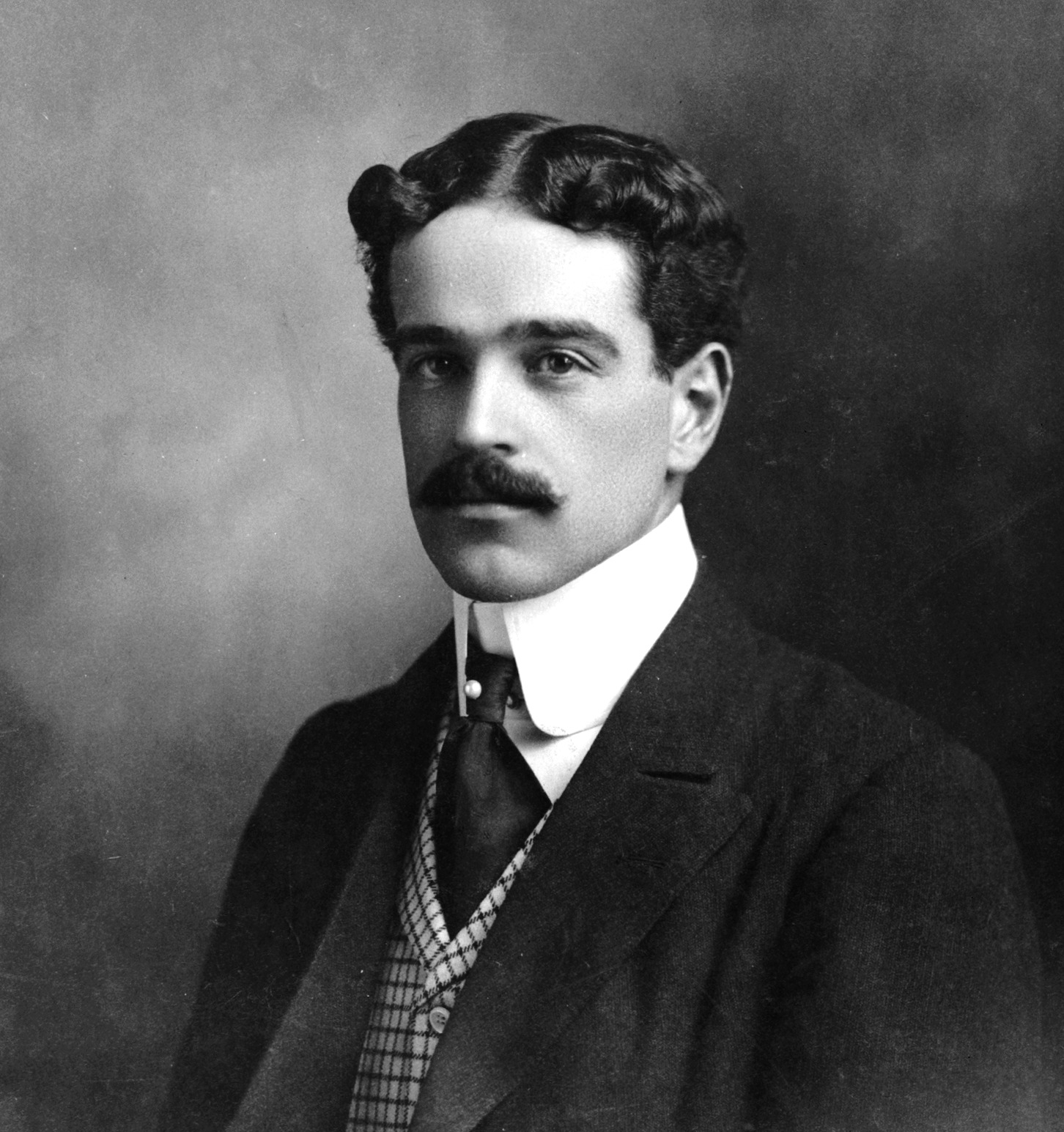
William Kissam Vanderbilt II

- William Kissam Vanderbilt II, railroad executive, industrialist, yachtsman, Fisher Island founder

== W ==
- James Wolcott Wadsworth Jr, New York senator 1915–1927
- T. Tileston Wells, consul general for Romania in America
- O.Z. Whitehead, character actor
- Karl Wiedergott, actor, best known for doing voices for The Simpsons; his father Fritz was the longtime athletic director at the school
- Sean Wilsey (did not graduate), memoirist

== Y ==
- Scott Young, National Hockey League player, St. Louis Blues
