= James Otis (New York politician) =

American politician (1836–1898)

Member of the New York State Senate from the 1st district
- In office January 1, 1884 – December 31, 1885
- Preceded by: James W. Covert
- Succeeded by: Edward F. Fagan

Personal details
- Born: October 12, 1836 New York City, New York, U.S.
- Died: July 22, 1898 (aged 61) Bellport, New York, U.S.
- Party: Republican
- Spouse: Adelia Ludlum (died 1890)
- Relations: See Otis family
- Children: 4
- Parent(s): James William Otis; Martha Church Otis

James Otis (October 12, 1836 – July 22, 1898) was a Republican member of the New York State Senate and a society leader during the Gilded Age.

== Early life ==
Otis was born in New York City on October 12, 1836, as a member of the prominent Boston Brahmin Otis family. He was the son of James William Otis (1800–1869) and Martha (née Church) Otis. His elder brother was William Church Otis, who married Margaret Sigourney (their daughter Violet was married to William Greenough Thayer).

He was the grandson of Harrison Gray Otis, a U.S. Senator and U.S. Representative from Massachusetts who was one of the wealthiest men of Boston during his time, and a great-grandson of Samuel Allyne Otis, a delegate from Massachusetts to the Second Continental Congress who served as the Speaker of the Massachusetts House of Representatives and the 1st Secretary of the United States Senate. He was also the granduncle of Sigourney Thayer, the theatrical producer, and Robert Helyer Thayer, the U.S. Minister to Romania under Dwight D. Eisenhower.

== Career ==
During the U.S. Civil War, Otis was a member of the Union Army, achieving the rank of colonel with the 22nd New York Regiment. He began his career working as an East Indian commission broker.

In 1878, he was an unsuccessful candidate to represent New York's 1st congressional district in the U.S. House of Representatives. In 1883, he was elected as a Republican to represent New York's 1st Senate District (comprising Queens and Suffolk counties) in the New York State Senate during the 107th and 108th New York State Legislatures, which was during the second and third year of Grover Cleveland's governorship. During his time in the Legislature, he served alongside cousin Norton P. Otis, who represented Westchester County in the Assembly. Norton later represented New York's 19th congressional district in the House of Representatives.

=== Society life ===
In 1892, the widower Otis and several of his relatives, including his unmarried daughter Sarah and grand-nephew J. Wadsworth Ritchie, were included in Ward McAllister's "Four Hundred", purported to be an index of New York's best families, published in The New York Times. Conveniently, 400 was the number of people that could fit into Mrs. Astor's ballroom. Otis, who spent his summers in Newport, Rhode Island, was a member of the Union League and Seawanhaka Yacht Club, and was known for many years a famous cotillion leader, bon vivant and raconteur.

== Personal life ==
Otis was married to Mary Adelia Ludlum (d. 1890), daughter of Nicholas Ludlum. They had a large country home and estate in Bellport on Long Island known as "Near-the-Bay" and a home in New York City at 22 East 10th Street near Tompkins Square Park. Together, they were the parents of:

- Mary Ludlum "May" Otis (1866–1946), who married Robert R. Livingston Clarkson (1855–1924), the son of Levinus Clarkson and Mary (née Livingston) Clarkson (daughter of Lt. Gov. of New York Edward Philip Livingston), on November 6, 1886.
- James Otis Jr., who predeceased his father.
- Martha Otis, who married banker George Munroe, and lived in Paris and married in 1889.
- (Sarah) Birdsall Otis Edey (1872–1940), an active campaigner for women's suffrage. She served as president of the Girl Scouts of the USA from 1930 to 1935. She married Frederick Edey, a member of the New York Stock Exchange, in 1893.

Otis died from congestion of the lungs on July 22, 1898, at his home in Bellport on Long Island. His funeral was held at Christ Chapel in Bellport and he was interred in the family vault in the Bellport Cemetery.

=== Descendants ===
Through his daughter Mary, he was the grandfather of James Otis Clarkson (1888–1951), Mary Adelia Clarkson (1889–1976), Pauline Livingston Clarkson (1892–1983), and Elizabeth Clarkson (1896–1956).

New York State Senate
Preceded by James W. Covert	New York State Senate; 1st District; 1884–1885	Succeeded by Edward F. Fagan
