= Stephen Galatti =

Director General of AFS (1888–1964)

- Born: August 6, 1888; Monmouth Beach, New Jersey
- Died: July 13, 1964 (aged 75)
- Occupation: Banker
- Known for: Putero
- Awards: Croix de Guerre (1915); Chevalier of the Legion of Honor; Medal of Freedom (1946); Commander of the Order of the British Empire (1946); Legion of Merit (1947); Verdienstkreuz erster Klasse (1959, Bundesrepublik Deutschland); Officer of the Order of Orange-Nassau (1960)
- Football career

Profile
- Position: Quarterback

Career information
- High school: St. Mark's
- College: Harvard

Stephen Galatti (August 6, 1888 — July 13, 1964) was for many years the Director General of the AFS, American Field Service. He transformed the AFS from a volunteer medical corps during World Wars I and II into an international educational exchange service that has profoundly transformed the lives of thousands of young people around the world.

Born on August 6, 1888, in Monmouth Beach, New Jersey, he was a graduate of St. Mark's School and Harvard College, he quarterbacked the Harvard football team.

Before World War I he began a career in banking in New York and Paris; following the war he returned to private life with the New York firm of Paine Webber. He first joined the American Field Service in 1915 and served as second in command to the founder and first director of AFS, A. Piatt Andrew. In World War I, the AFS played a major role in supplying ambulance drivers to the Franco-German front, and many drivers were killed. Following the war, the AFS became dormant except for limited scholarship aid for studies in France.

In 1935 Stephen Galatti became the Director General of the AFS. When World War II broke out, Galatti summoned veterans of World War I to his side. He re-established AFS in 1939 as the Germans invaded Poland then turned on France, England, and Russia. Despite American isolationism, Galatti organized and equipped the first unit of the AFS, and subsequently served through the war as a Director-General with the rank of Colonel.

Searching for a role for the AFS following the war, he founded the Scholarship Program (AFSIS) in 1946, and then led the AFS as its president for the rest of his life, over time transforming it from an auxiliary medical corps for wartime into an international educational exchange service with tens of thousands of volunteers worldwide.

During his lifetime, Stephen Galatti received the Croix de Guerre and the post of Chevalier of the Legion of Honor, Commander of the Order of the British Empire, the Medal of Freedom, the posts of Officer of the Order of Orange-Nassau and Verdienstkreuz erster Klasse (Bundesrepublik Deutschland), and honorary MA from Yale, and honorary LL.D. from the University at Buffalo and from Harvard.

== See also ==
- List of St. Mark's School alumni
