= George Putnam =

George Putnam may refer to:

- George Putnam (minister) (1807–1878), American Unitarian minister, politician, and Transcendentalist
- George Putnam (editor) (1872–1961), Oregon newspaper publisher and editor of the Statesman Journal
- George Putnam (newsman) (1914–2008), Los Angeles, California, television newsman
- George D. Putnam (born 1948), screenwriter, Unlawful Entry
- George Palmer Putnam (1814–1872), founder of the publishing firm that became G. P. Putnam's Sons
- George Haven Putnam (1844–1930), American soldier, publisher, author, son of George Palmer Putnam
- George Herbert Putnam (1861–1955), lawyer, publisher, librarian of Library of Congress, son of George Palmer Putnam
- George P. Putnam (1887–1950), publisher, author, explorer, grandson of George Palmer Putnam, husband of Amelia Earhart
- George Washington Putnam (1826–1899), American soldier and politician
- George Putnam (businessman), founder of Putnam Investments
  - George Putnam III, his grandson, editor and founder of The Turnaround Letter

== See also ==
- G. P. Putnam's Sons, a United States book publisher
