= Embassy of Egypt, Moscow =

Diplomatic mission of Egypt to Russia

Embassy of the Arab Republic of Egypt in Moscow
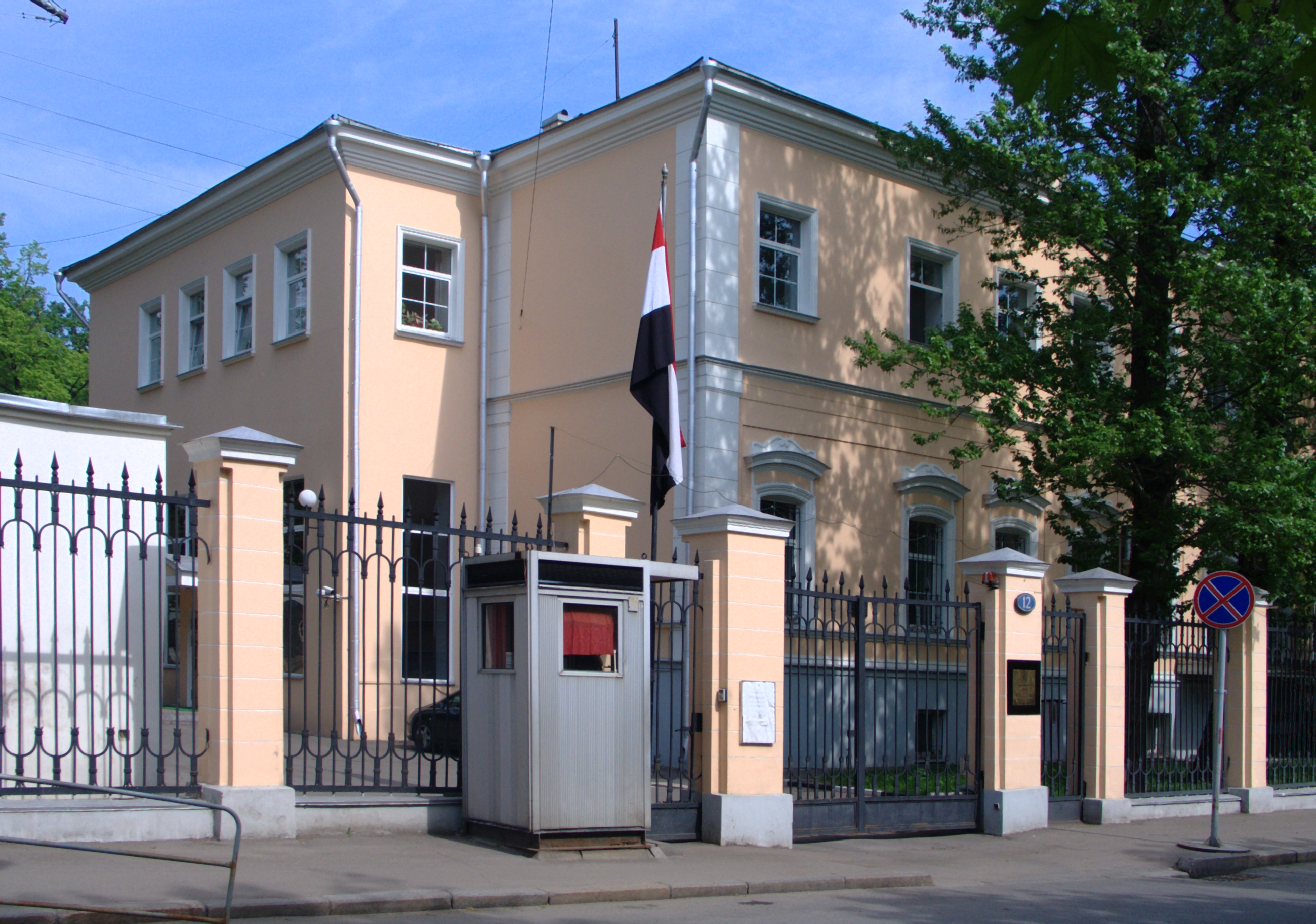
- Location: Khamovniki, Moscow
- Address: 12 Kropotkinsky Lane
- Coordinates: 55°44′21″N 37°35′30″E
- Ambassador: Hamdi Shaaban

The Embassy of Egypt in Moscow (Russian: Посольство Арабской Республики Египет в Москве; Arabic: سفارة جمهورية مصر العربية في موسكو) is the diplomatic mission of the Arab Republic of Egypt to the Russian Federation. The chancery is located at 12 Kropotkinsky Lane (Russian: Кропоткинский пер., 12) in the Khamovniki District of Moscow.

The current Egyptian ambassador to Russia is Hamdi Shaaban.

== History ==
Diplomatic relations between the Soviet Union (USSR) and the Kingdom of Egypt were established on August 26, 1943. The first Egyptian ambassador to the USSR was Kamil Abdul Rahim. In the 1950s and 1960s, Egypt was the USSR's most important partner in the Middle East. However, in the early 1970s, President Anwar Sadat significantly changed Egypt's political course and relations between the USSR and Egypt cooled. In the mid-1980s, under Egyptian President Hosni Mubarak, relations improved again. On December 26, 1991, Egypt declared its recognition of the Russian Federation as the successor to the former USSR. In 2009, a strategic partnership agreement was signed.

The embassy is housed at the former Girshman Manor, built in 1897 and designed by architect Semen Eibushitz.

== List of representatives ==
Below is a list of diplomatic representatives from Egypt to Soviet Union and the Russian Federation.

Ambassador		Term	
Ambassador		Appointment	End date
Kamil Abdul Rahim	كامل عبد الرحيم	June 17, 1944	1948
Aziz Ali al-Misri	عزيز علي المصري	1952	1953
Mohammed Awad al-Kuni	محمد عوض القوني	1957	1961
Mohammed Murad Ghaleb	محمد مراد غالب	July 12, 1961	1971
Yahya Abdel Kader	يحيى عبد القادر	September 27, 1972	
Mohammed Hafez Ismail	محمد حافظ إسماعيل	1974	April 1, 1976
Mohammad Hamdi Abuzeid	محمد حمدي أبو زيد	April 1975	December 1977
Mohammed Sami Anwar	محمد سامي أنور	November 18, 1979	1980
Salah al-Din Basyouni	صلاح الدين بسيوني	September 17, 1984	1988
Ahmed Maher El Sayed	أحمد ماهر السيد	1988	July 9, 1992
Reda Ahmed Shehata	رضا أحمد شحاتة	2000	2003
Ezzat Saad El-Sayed El Buraey	عزت سعد سيد بوراي	April 13, 2006	2010
Mohammed Alaa Eldin Ali Shawky Elhadidi	علاء الدين علي محمد شوقى الحديدي	June 3, 2010	
Mahmoud Gamil Ahmed Eldib	محمود جميل الديب	January 24, 2013	2015
Mohamed Abd El-Sattar Elbadri	محمد عبد الستار البدري	2015	October 2017
Ihab Talaat Nasr	إيهاب طلعت نصر	November 15, 2017	
Nazih Ali Bahaeldin El-Nagary	نزيه علي بهاء الدين النجاري	2021	2025
Hamdi Shaaban	حمدي شعبان	2026	Incumbent

== See also ==
- Egypt–Russia relations
- Diplomatic missions in Russia
