= Sheffield Phelps =

American businessman and philanthropist (1920–2006)

Sheffield Phelps (1921–2006) was an American businessperson, and a prominent figure in the art community. He was the scion of an old New England family who moved to Washington state and rose to become president of Seafirst Mortgage company, the Seattle Opera Board, and the Pacific Northwest Ballet. He left behind a remarkable record in business and civic life, most notably as a financial and organizational pillar for the Pacific Northwest Ballet.

Descended from a family that landed in Massachusetts in 1634, he grew up in New England, preparing for college at St. Mark's School in Southborough, Massachusetts and attending Yale University. He served as a United States Marine Corps Major during World War II, flying 92 missions with reconnaissance planes and earning the Distinguished Flying Cross.

He was president of the Seattle Opera board when it helped launch the Pacific Northwest Ballet. He joined the new venture as board president, and in 1977 helped recruit the company's founding artistic directors, Kent Stowell and Francia Russell. The company's headquarters, the Phelps Center, bears his name. "Without him, there would not be Pacific Northwest Ballet," Stowell said.

Phelps' financial skills helped the ballet become a national model, and he never asked for artistic sacrifices to make the books balance, Stowell said.
