= Sigourney Thayer =

American poet (1896–1944)

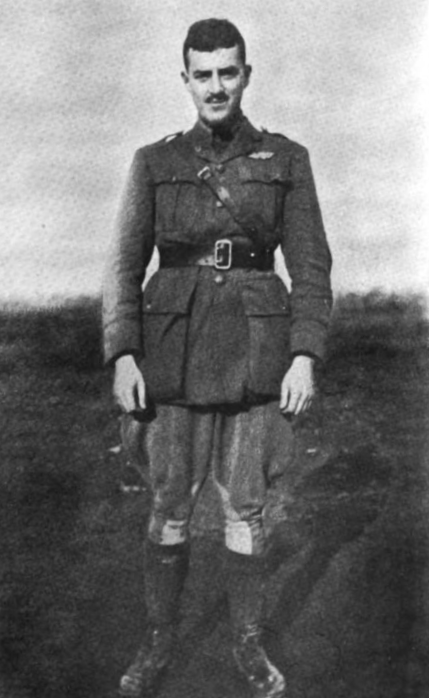
- Thayer in January 1919
- Born: March 24, 1896; Southborough, Massachusetts, U.S.
- Died: November 2, 1944 (aged 48); Allentown, Pennsylvania, U.S.
- Education: St. Mark's School
- Alma mater: Amherst College
- Occupations: Producer; aviator; poet
- Spouses: Emily Davies Vanderbilt (m. 1928; div. 1929) Mary Van Rensselaer Cogswell (m. 1931)
- Parent(s): William Greenough Thayer; Violet Otis
- Relatives: Robert H. Thayer (brother)

Sigourney Thayer (March 24, 1896 – November 2, 1944) was an American theatrical producer, World War I aviator, and poet.

== Early life ==
Thayer was born in Southborough, Massachusetts, the son of Rev. William Greenough Thayer (1863–1934), headmaster of St. Mark's School from 1894–1930, and Violet (née Otis) Thayer, a member of the Boston Brahmin Otis family of Boston. He was the brother of Robert Helyer Thayer (1901−1984), a lawyer, naval officer and diplomat.

== Career ==
In June 1916, Thayer enlisted and first served on the American-Mexican border. He became a 1st lieutenant and pilot in the 1st Operations Group, and afterwards graduated from Amherst College in 1918. He wrote regular poetry for the Atlantic Monthly, and his poem, "The Dead" has appeared in numerous World War I anthologies.

In later life, Thayer became an executive at Vultee Aircraft.

=== Theatrical producer ===
In the 1920s and 1930s, Thayer was a theatrical producer. He produced Last Night of Don Juan: The Pilgrimage (1925), Beau-Strings (1926), Damn the Tears (1927), Bridal Wise (1932), and Keeper of the Keys (1933).

== Personal life ==
In December 1928, he married Emily O'Neill (née Davies) Vanderbilt (1903–1935) of Manhattan (who had divorced William Henry Vanderbilt III earlier the same year). She was the daughter of Frederick Martin Davies, granddaughter of Daniel O'Neill, owner of the Pittsburgh Dispatch newspaper, and the grandniece of Frederick Townsend Martin, a prominent writer of the 1920s. Their marriage lasted less than a year. After her divorce from Thayer in 1929, Emily married writer Raoul Whitfield (1896–1945) in 1933. She filed for divorce in February 1935, and killed herself at the Dead Horse Ranch near Las Vegas, New Mexico, on May 24, 1935.

In April 1931, Thayer married Mary "Molly" Van Rensselaer Cogswell (1902–1983), daughter of Cullen Van Rensselaer Cogswell, a Manhattan socialite, and great granddaughter of General John Cullen Van Rensselaer. She was a society columnist for the New York Journal, and wrote under the house pseudonym "Madame Flutterby", covering the Lindbergh kidnapping. She wrote the first biography of Jacqueline Bouvier Kennedy, published by Doubleday in 1961. Together, they had a daughter:

- Eugenie Sigourney Thayer (1933–2015), who married Hussein Rahim, the son of Kamil Abdul Rahim, the Egyptian Ambassador to the United States, in 1961.

He died in 1944 in an automobile accident in Allentown, Pennsylvania, and is buried at Southborough Rural Cemetery, Southborough, Massachusetts.
