= Egypt–Russia relations =

- Egypt: Russia

Diplomatic mission
- Egyptian Embassy, Moscow: Russian Embassy, Cairo

Egypt–Russia relations (Russian: Российско-египетские отношения) are the bilateral relations between Egypt and Russia. Diplomatic relations between the Soviet Union and Egypt were established on August 26, 1943. Egypt has an embassy in Moscow, while Russia has an embassy in Cairo and a consulate-general in Alexandria.

== History ==
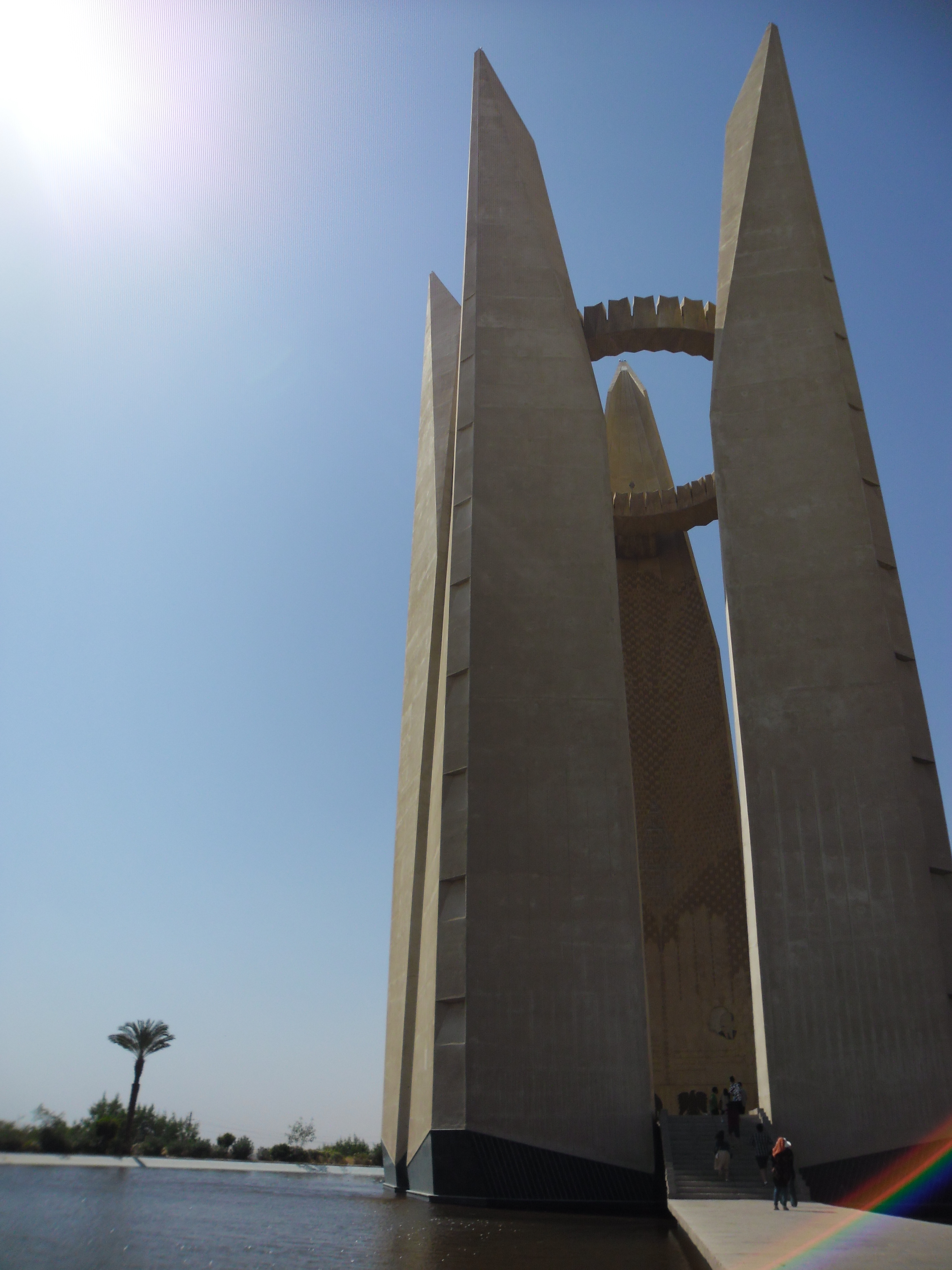
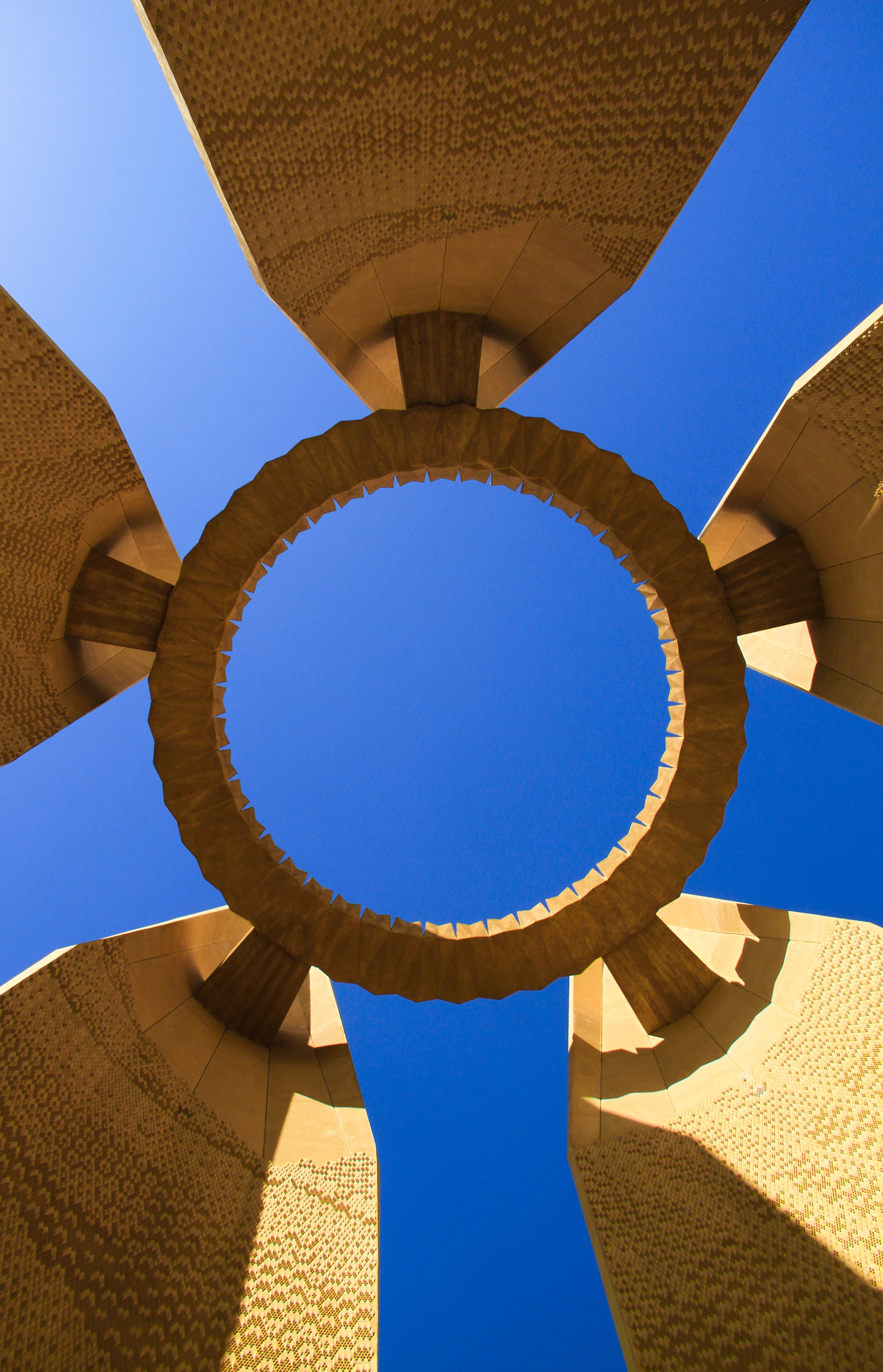
The Russian-Egyptian Friendship Monument is located near the Aswan High Dam in Egypt

Relations between Russia and Egypt have a long history, dating back to before the 16th century. Early on, they were centered on the Russian government's and the Russian Church's support for the Greek Orthodox Church of Alexandria. As early as in 1556, Patriarch Joachim of Alexandria sent a letter to the Russian Tsar Ivan IV, asking the Orthodox monarch to provide some material assistance for the Saint Catherine's Monastery in the Sinai Peninsula, which had suffered from the Turks. In 1558, the Czar sent to Egypt a delegation led by archdeacon Gennady, who, however, died in Constantinople before he could reach Egypt. From then on, the embassy was headed by a Smolensk merchant, Vasily Poznyakov. Poznyakov's delegation visited Alexandria, Cairo, and Sinai, brought the patriarch a fur coat and an icon sent by the Tzar. Poznyakov's account of its two and half years' travels, which may have been the first ever Russian first-hand African trip report, became popular among Russian readers for centuries to follow.

Russia continued to provide support to Egyptian Christians for centuries to come.

During the Russo-Turkish War of 1768–1774, Russia supported the Mamluks of Egypt against the Ottomans. The Russians sent multiple expeditions to the Levant. In the first half of the 19th century, Russia and Egypt were at odds over the fate of the Ottoman Empire.

In the 1950s, Gamal Abdel Nasser's independent and anti-imperialist policy earned him enthusiastic support from the communist government of the Soviet Union. In 1955, Egypt made a major arms deal with Soviet Union, and from then, teams of Egyptian officers were trained in Eastern Bloc countries. Czechoslovak instructors also came in 1956, to train Egyptian personnel in the use of Soviet weapons. When France, Britain, and Israel attacked Egypt during the Suez Crisis, Khrushchev threatened to use nuclear weapons against them in defense of Egypt. The degree of the Soviet approval of the Egyptian leader's policies culminated, rather controversially, in the award of the highest Soviet decoration, the star of the Hero of the Soviet Union with the Order of Lenin to Nasser during Nikita Khrushchev's visit to the country in 1964.

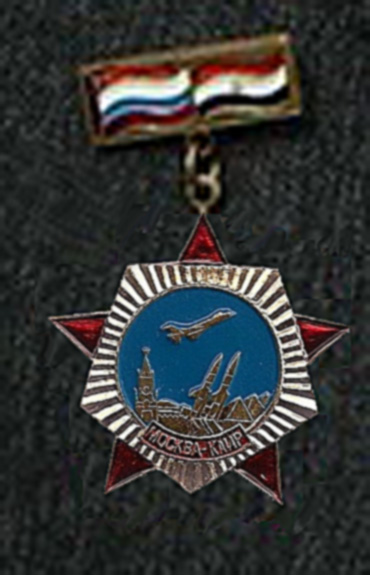
Soviet badge issued to Soviet soldiers who served during the War of Attrition in United Arab Republic (Egypt).

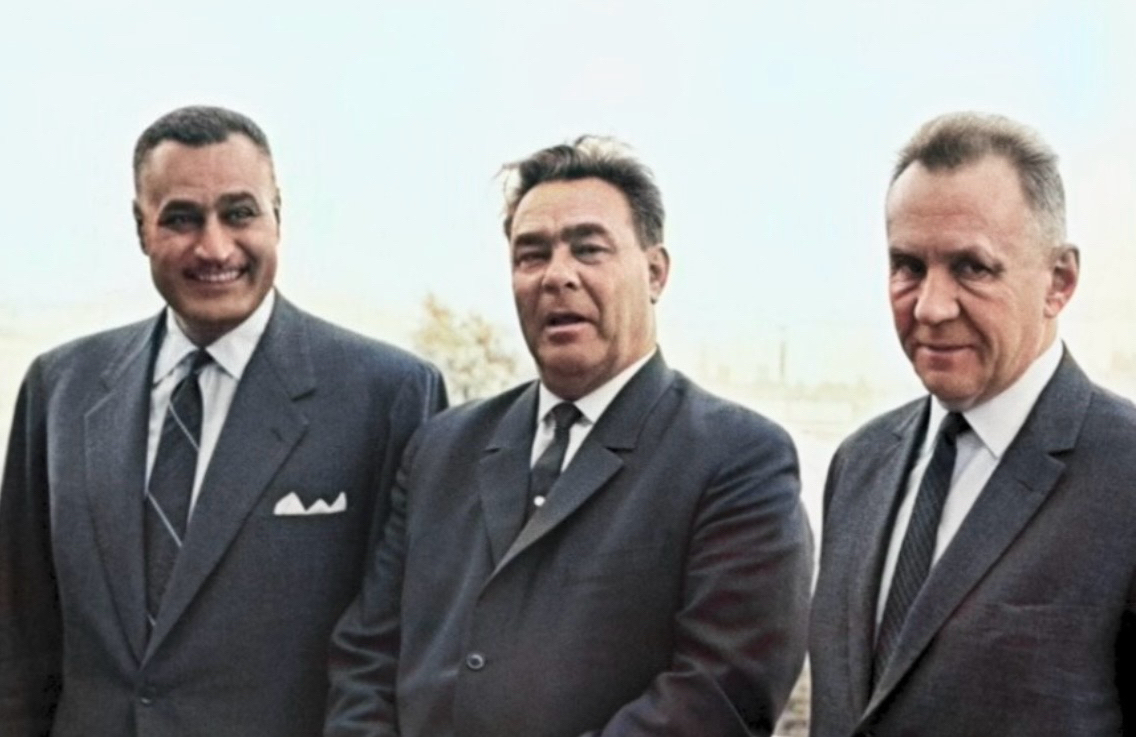
From left to rights: leaders: Gamal Abdel Nasser, Leonid Brezhnev, and Alexei Kosygin.

During the Nasser era, many young Egyptians studied in Soviet universities and military schools. Among them was the future president, Hosni Mubarak, who went for training in a military pilot school in Kyrgyzstan. During the War of Attrition, the USSR sent 10-15,000 servicemen to operate the air defense of Egypt against Israeli air attacks.

The relationship went sour within years after the death of Nasser, when the new president, Anwar Sadat, started re-orienting the country towards the West. On May 27, 1971, the Soviet-Egyptian Treaty of Friendship and Cooperation was signed between the two countries, but relations were nevertheless declining. In July 1972, it was claimed that the Egyptian government had expelled Soviet military advisors from Egypt, however new research indicates that this was disinformation to hide Egypt's offensive plans, and captured Egyptian documents demonstrate that Soviet advisors continued in their previous roles of training Egyptian troops, and were certainly present during the war in 1973. During the Yom Kippur War, the Soviet Union sent several thousands of tonnes of aid to Egypt. Brezhnev threatened to intervene on behalf of Egypt if Israel broke the ceasefire. Lieutenant General Anatoly Pushkin claimed that 1,500 Soviet pilots and air defense experts engaged in combat for Egypt during the war. In March 1976 Egypt abrogated the friendship treaty, and relations between the two countries were damaged once again when Egypt supported the Mujahideen in Afghanistan when the USSR invaded in 1979. In September 1981, these relations were severed by the Egyptian government, accusing Soviet leadership of trying to undermine Sadat's leadership in retaliation to the Israeli-Egyptian peace treaty. Relations were reestablished under president Hosni Mubarak in 1984, and Alexander Belonogov became the Ambassador. In February 1989, Soviet Minister of Foreign Affairs Eduard Shevardnadze visited Egypt.

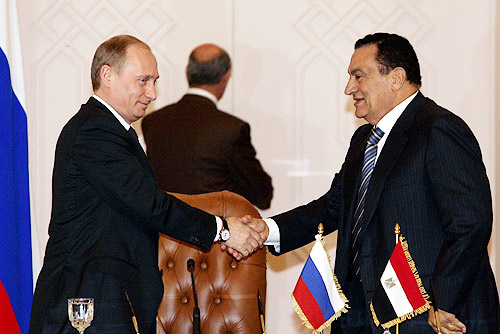
Vladimir Putin with Egyptian president Hosni Mubarak in April 2005

Intergovernmental relations improved after the fall of communism and the breakup of the USSR, and Russia's appearance as an independent political actor.

In April 2005, Russian President Vladimir Putin visited Egypt, and Egyptian President Hosni Mubarak visited Russia in April 2008. Both countries agreed to work together to help Egypt create a nuclear program which is mostly for civilian purposes. In May 2013, Egyptian President Mohamed Morsi visited Russia.

=== After the removal of Mohamed Morsi from office ===
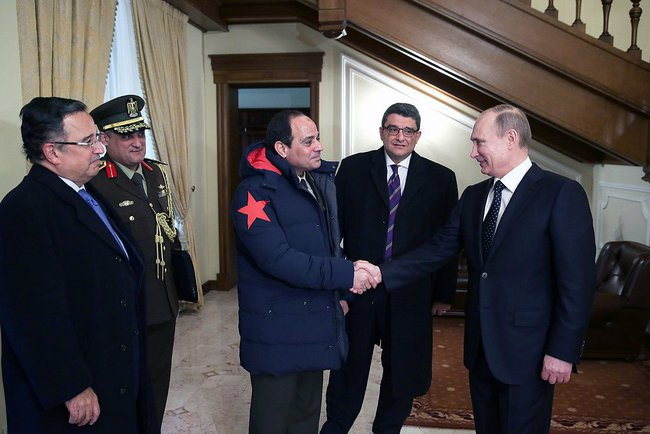
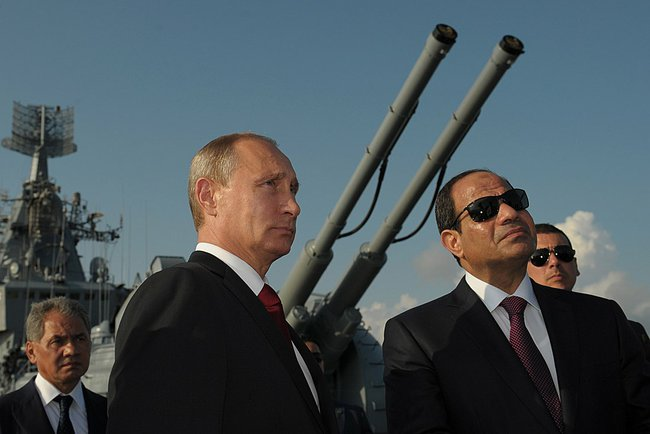
Left: Sisi on his first visit to Russia as defense minister, during which Putin gave him a red star jacket. (February 13, 2014)
Right: Putin and Sisi, during the latter's second visit, on board the Russian cruiser Moskva in Sochi. (August 12, 2014).

Relations between the two countries improved even further following the removal of Mohamed Morsi from office in July 2013. Both countries have since then worked closely to strengthen military and trade ties, among other aspects of bilateral cooperation. From 2009 to 2018, Russia accounted for 31% of Egypt's imports of major weapons.

In November 2013, Egypt's then Defense Minister Abdel Fattah al-Sisi and Foreign Minister Nabil Fahmy met with their Russian counterparts, Defense Minister Sergei Shoigu and Foreign Minister Sergey Lavrov who were on a visit to Cairo. Fahmy stated that Egypt wished to return to Soviet-level relations with Russia, and Shoigu hinted that there may be military cooperation between the Russian and Egyptian navies and air forces. Badr Abdelatty, an Egyptian foreign ministry spokesman, stated that Egypt was seeking to increase the independence of its foreign policy. It was the first meeting of its kind since the Soviet era.

Since then, Egyptian and Russian leaders have exchanged two rounds of four-way visits in both Cairo and Moscow. Sisi went to Russia twice in 2014: in February, when he was still Egypt's defense minister, and in August after his election as president. The February meeting was Sisi's first visit abroad following Mohamed Morsi's removal, during which Russian president Vladimir Putin offered him Russia's backing in his race for the presidency of Egypt before Sisi even officially announced his campaign.

Sisi made his second visit on August 12 at the Black Sea resort of Sochi, and it was his first to a non-Arab or African country since his inauguration as president two months earlier. During the visit, both him and Putin agreed on boosting bilateral cooperation between the two countries. Putin promised to speed up arms sales to Egypt. "We are actively developing our military and technological cooperation," Putin told Sisi. He added that a corresponding protocol was signed in March and that weapons are being delivered to Egypt.

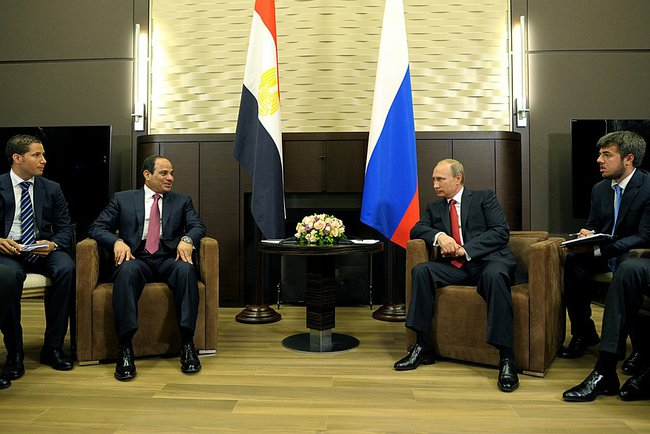
Vladimir Putin held talks in Sochi with President of Egypt Abdel Fattah al-Sisi.

Trade and economic investment plans were also announced during the meeting, during which Putin said that Egypt was discussing a free trade zone with the Russian-led Eurasian Customs Union which also includes Belarus and Kazakhstan. Additionally, both leaders have discussed plans to establish a Russian industrial zone in the New Suez Canal project that was recently inaugurated by Sisi, as well as another plan to renew and redevelop important projects that were established by the former Soviet Union.

In September 2014, a preliminary deal was reached between both countries to buy arms worth $3.5 billion from Russia, despite international sanctions on Moscow as a result of its involvement in the war in Donbas.

As a result of the Metrojet Flight 9268 crash on October 31, 2015, which carried 224 passengers on board toward Russia, both countries were planning investigating the crash.

On November 28, 2015, Egypt and Russia signed a deal which would allow Russian and Egyptian warplanes to use each other's airbases and airspace. Both countries could be described as "close allies" as Putin usually referred to Sisi as a "Trusted and Close Partner." On 11 December 2017, during President Vladimir Putin's visit to Cairo, the two countries signed agreements in which Russia would build Egypt's first nuclear reactor, and supply nuclear fuel for the same. It was also agreed that a "Russian Industrial Zone" would be built along the Suez Canal, explained by Putin as being "the biggest regional center for producing Russian products onto the markets of the Middle-East and North Africa."

=== International collaborations ===
Russia supported the Assad government in the Syrian civil war, and intervened militarily in its favor in 2015. Egypt also supported the Syrian government during the civil war. In 2020, Egypt was reported to have deployed 150 troops to help the Syrian government. Egypt openly backed the House of Representatives in the Second Libyan Civil War, while the Russian mercenary organization Wagner Group also supported the House of Representatives' forces.

=== Arms deal ===
In Summer 2020, Egypt received five Su-35 jets from Russia, despite a threat from the United States that it would violate international sanctions. However, the Russian journalist who revealed the transaction, Ivan Safronov, was detained for disclosing a state secret.

=== Russian Invasion of Ukraine and beyond ===
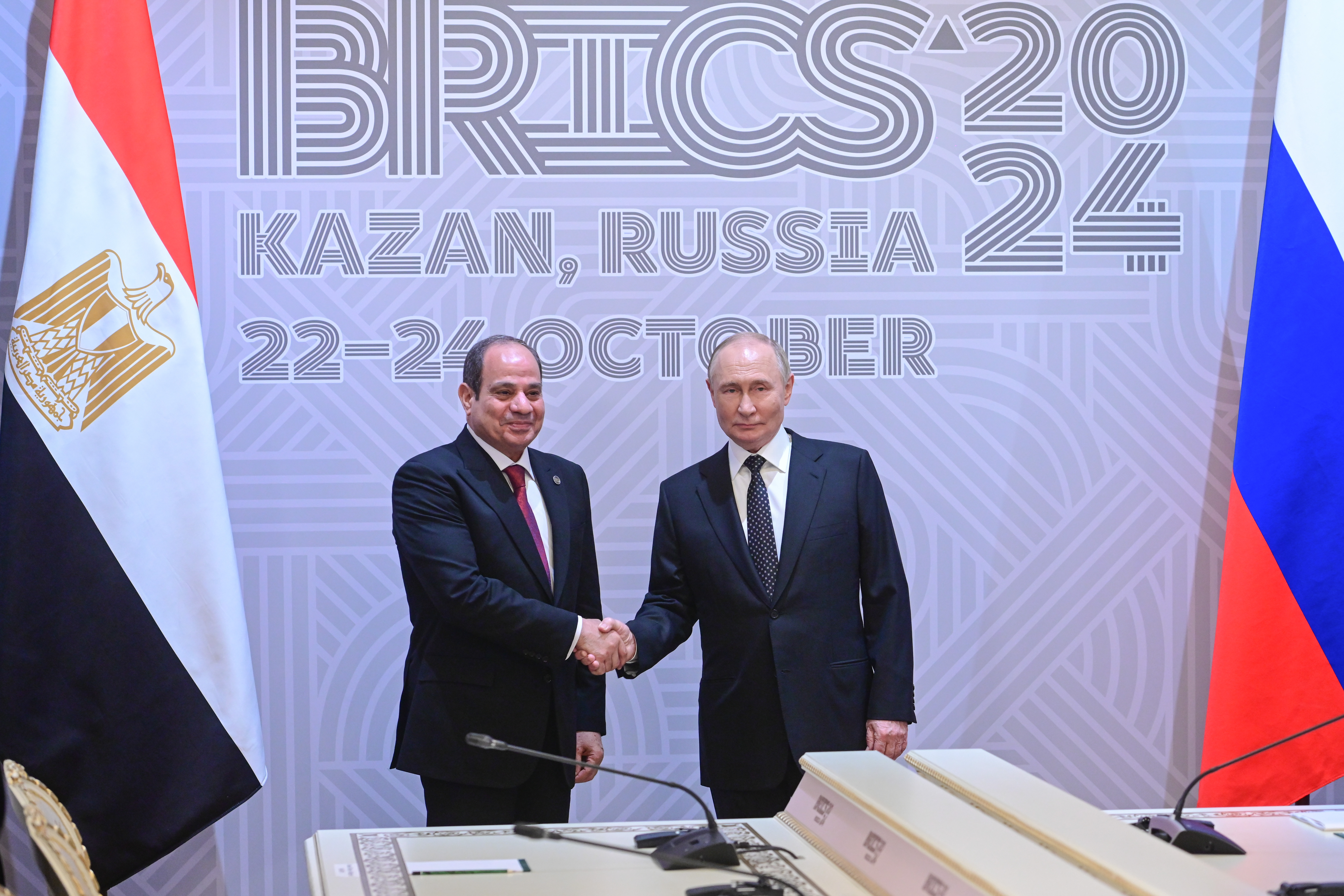
Russian President Vladimir Putin with Egyptian President Abdel Fattah el-Sisi during the 16th BRICS Summit in Kazan, Russia, 22 October 2024

Egypt voted in favor of the United Nations resolution condemning Russia's invasion of Ukraine and calling for a withdrawal of Russia's forces from the country. However, President Sisi called President Putin on March 9 to clarify Egypt's vote and both countries said they would keep working together to develop their strategic partnership. Egypt has rejected economic sanctions against Russia. In fact, the country has encouraged the Mir payment system to stimulate Russian trade and tourism with Egypt.

During the 2023 Russia–Africa Summit, Egyptian President Abdel Fattah el-Sisi urged Vladimir Putin to renew the grain deal and allow Ukraine to export grain via the Black Sea route. In August 2023, a Russian drone attack on the port of Izmail in southern Ukraine destroyed 13,000 tons of grain destined for Egypt and Romania.

On 23 August 2023, at the 15th BRICS summit, Russia along with the other members of BRICS formally invited Egypt to join the organization. Egypt became a full member starting 1 January 2024.

On 27 March 2025, a tragic event occurred when a tourist submarine operated by Sindbad Submarines sank near Hurghada, killing six Russian tourists and injuring 29 others. The submarine, carrying 45 Russian passengers and five Egyptian crew members, was on an underwater excursion to observe coral reefs when it sank. Despite the high number of casualties, the incident was swiftly managed by local rescue teams, and investigations were initiated to determine the cause. This event was part of a series of recent tourist-related accidents in the Red Sea region.

The relationship between Egypt and Russia has been marked by Russian tourism's growing importance to Egypt's economy, with Russia ranking as one of the largest sources of tourists, particularly in resorts like Hurghada, a major destination for Russian nationals.

== Tourism ==
Russians constitute the largest group of outsiders to visit Egypt, while Russia is popular with Egyptian tourists as well. As of 2015 Egypt is the most popular tourist destination for Russians traveling abroad—a basic vacation package including flight, hotel and meals can be purchased for as little as US$1,000.

In August 2021, direct commercial flights between Russia and Egypt resumed for the first time since the Metrojet Flight 9268 bombing in 2015, which killed 224 people, most of whom were Russian tourists. A Rossiya Airlines passenger plane landed in Sharm El Sheikh carrying 518 passengers, and was welcomed with a water cannon salute, roses and flags.

== Higher education ==
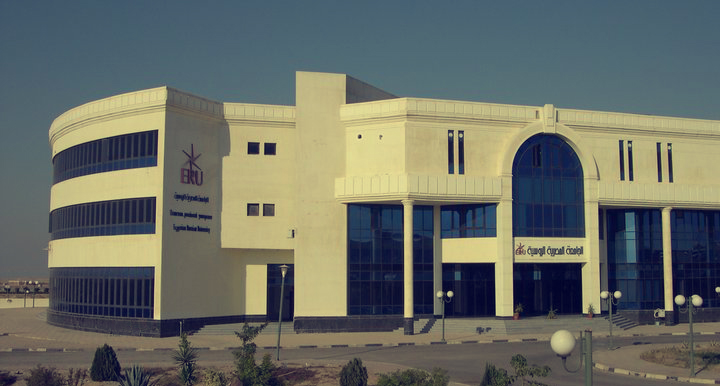
Egyptian Russian University

In 2006, the Egyptian Russian University was opened in Badr City, Cairo, offering training in pharmacy and engineering. Many of its students visit Izhevsk, Russia, for additional classroom study and summer internships. Plans are underway to add a program in nuclear power engineering as well.

== See also ==
- Foreign relations of Egypt
- Foreign relations of Russia
- List of ambassadors of Russia to Egypt
- List of ambassadors from Egypt
