= George Putnam III =

- Born: United States
- Education: Harvard University
- Occupations: Editor, publisher
- Relatives: George Putnam (grandfather)

George Putnam III is the editor and founder of The Turnaround Letter, a newsletter published by New Generation Research, Inc. which deals with investment opportunities related to distressed securities, bankruptcies and turnarounds. He is also president of New Generation Advisers, Inc., which manages a hedge fund which invests in distressed securities.

He graduated from St. Mark's School in Southborough, Massachusetts, where he is an active trustee making a speech at graduation every year.

Putnam is a graduate of Harvard College, Harvard Law School and Harvard Business School.

He is also a trustee for Putnam Investments, a mutual fund group founded by his grandfather George Putnam, and an Overseer of the Sea Education Association.
