= William Greenough Thayer =

William Greenough Thayer (December 24, 1863 – November 27, 1934) was an American educator, Episcopal reverend. Thayer was one of the "principal figures in private education in the United States," serving as the headmaster of St. Mark's School in Southborough, Massachusetts, from 1894 to 1930.

== Early life and education ==
Thayer was born in New Brighton, Staten Island, New York, the son of Robert H. Thayer, a hardware merchant and ship chandler, and Hannah F. (Appleton) Thayer.

He attended the Orange Classical Institute in Orange, New Jersey, before attending Amherst College. He was graduated from Amherst in 1885 with an A.B. degree then attended Union Theological Seminary from 1885 to 1888. (He taught at Groton School in Groton, Massachusetts, from 1886 to 1887, before returning to Union Theological Seminary.) In 1888, he was awarded an A.M. degree from Amherst College.

== Career ==
In June 1889, Thayer was ordained an Episcopal deacon, and in May 1890, he was ordained an Episcopal priest. In 1891, after marrying nineteen-year-old Violet Otis, he returned to Groton, while also serving as vicar of St. Andrew's Church in nearby Ayer, Massachusetts.

Thayer taught at Groton School (1886-1887, 1889-1894) before being appointed headmaster of St. Mark's School, a post he held for 36 years until 1930. During this period, Thayer made numerous improvements to the school and its reputation rose to be amongst the most prominent private schools in the country.

Eight or ten times in the school year, Thayer would leave school to marry his alumni. From the Time article: Imposing is his Record at Socialite Weddings, for Loyal St. Mark's Grooms will have no other Cleric.

He was known by staff and students as "Twill".

== Personal life ==
His wife was Violet (Otis) Thayer (January 17, 1871 – November 16, 1962), daughter of William C. and Margaret (Sigourney) Otis of Boston.

They married in Boston on June 1, 1891. They had five sons and two daughters:

1. Violet Otis Thayer Parker (1892-1990)
2. William Greenough Thayer Jr. (1893-1970)
3. Liet. Sigourney Thayer (1896-1944)
4. James Appleton Thayer Sr. (1899-1978)
5. Robert Helyer Thayer (1901-1984)
6. Margaret Thayer Suydam (1905-1968)
7. John Otis Thayer (1911-1988)
