= Samuel Allyne Otis =

American politician

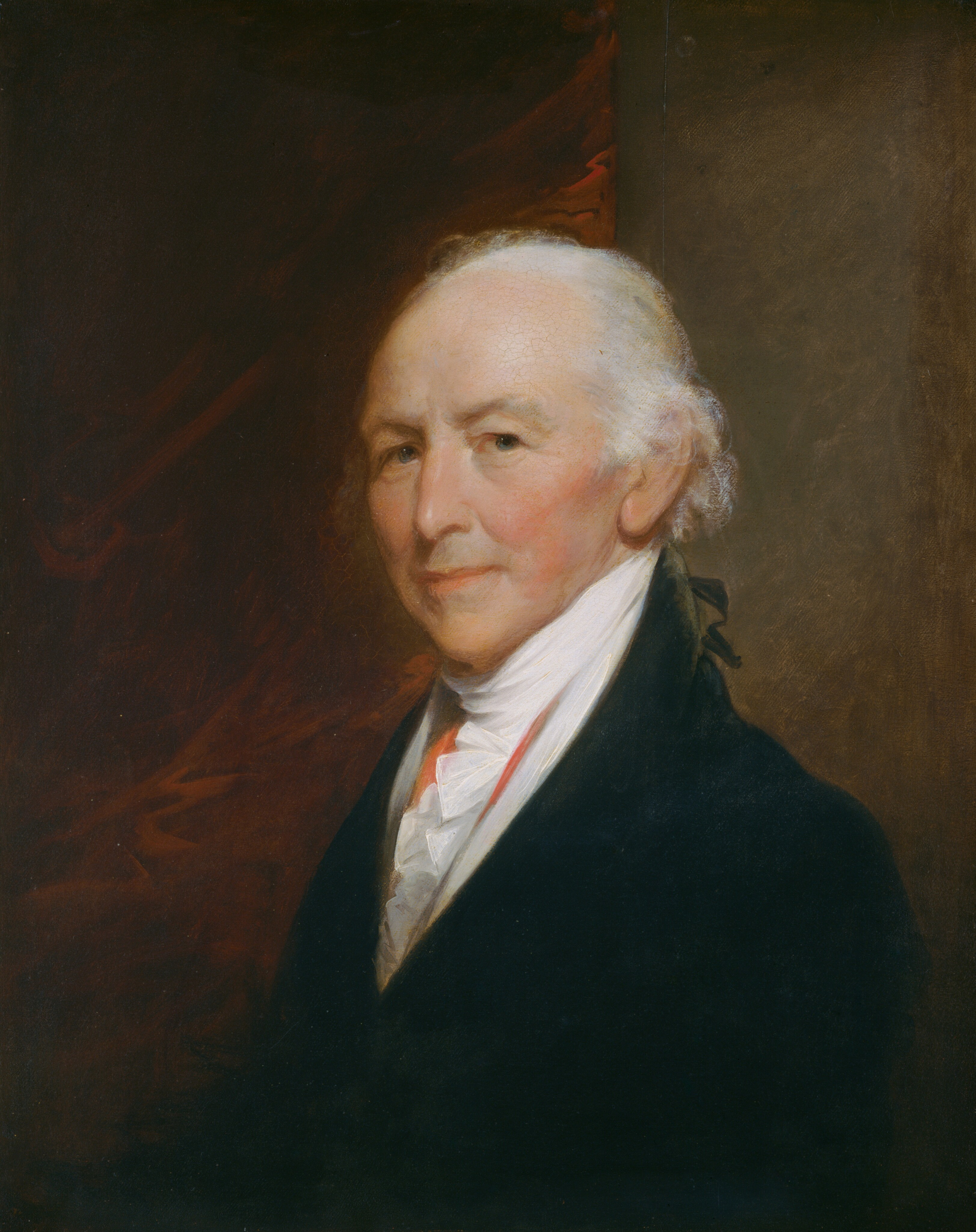
- Portrait by Gilbert Stuart, c. 1811–1813

1st Secretary of the United States Senate
- In office April 8, 1789 – April 22, 1814
- Preceded by: Office established
- Succeeded by: Charles Cutts

Speaker of the Massachusetts House of Representatives
- In office 1784–1785
- Preceded by: Tristram Dalton
- Succeeded by: Nathaniel Gorham

Delegate from Massachusetts to the Second Continental Congress
- In office 1777–1778

Personal details
- Born: November 24, 1740 Barnstable, Massachusetts, British America
- Died: April 22, 1814 (aged 73) Washington, D.C., U.S.
- Party: Federalist
- Children: Harrison Gray Otis (lawyer)
- Relatives: Otis family
- Education: Harvard University
- Profession: merchant

Samuel Allyne Otis (November 24, 1740 – April 22, 1814) was an American politician who was the first Secretary of the United States Senate, serving for its first 25 years.

== Early political career ==
Otis was a delegate to both the Second Continental Congress, from 1777 to 1778, and to the Congress of the Confederation in 1787 and 1788. He was also a Massachusetts state representative, serving as speaker in 1784 and 1785, and an unsuccessful congressional candidate in 1788.

== Secretary of the Senate ==
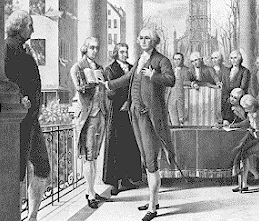
Washington's Inauguration: Samuel A. Otis holding Bible

Coat of Arms of Samuel Allyne Otis

Early in 1789, as plans went forward for establishing the new Congress under the recently ratified Constitution, a heated contest developed for the job of Senate Secretary. The obvious candidate was dapper sixty-year-old Charles Thomson, secretary of the soon-to-expire Continental Congress during its entire fifteen-year existence. But Thomson weakened his candidacy by telling friends that he had a different secretarial post in mind—one in George Washington's cabinet. As the March 1789 convening date of the Senate neared, however, Thomson realized that he had no chance of landing a cabinet appointment. Consequently, he decided he would indeed like to become the first Secretary of the Senate—as well as Secretary of the House and Secretary of the entire government. This would not be too taxing, he thought, because he expected to have an assistant who would "do the ordinary business of the [Senate], so that I may not be under the necessity of attending except on special occasions and when the great business of the Nation is under deliberation." This expression of Thomson's lofty self-importance helps explain why he had attracted a more-than-usual number of enemies during his public career.

A group of those foes devised a scheme—disguised as an honor—to get him out of town during the crucial last-minute maneuvering leading to the Secretary's election. Congressional leaders asked Thomson to travel from the nation's temporary New York City capital to Virginia to "notify" George Washington of his election and accompany the president-elect back to New York. Washington needed no notification, but he accepted Thomson's companionship in good humor. With Thomson safely away from the Senate, Vice President-elect John Adams maneuvered for the election of his own candidate—Samuel Allyne Otis.

Supremely qualified for the job, the forty-eight-year-old Otis had been a former quartermaster of the Continental Army, speaker of the Massachusetts House of Representatives, member of Congress under the Articles of Confederation, and John Adams' long-term ally. On April 8, 1789, two days after the Senate achieved its first quorum, members elected Otis as their chief legislative, financial, and administrative officer.

Otis' early duties combined symbolism and substance. On April 30, he had the high honor of holding the Bible as George Washington took his presidential oath of office. Throughout that first session, which lasted until September, Otis tirelessly engaged the many tasks associated with establishing a new institution. As the Senate set down its legislative procedures and carefully negotiated relations with the House and President Washington, Otis became a key player.

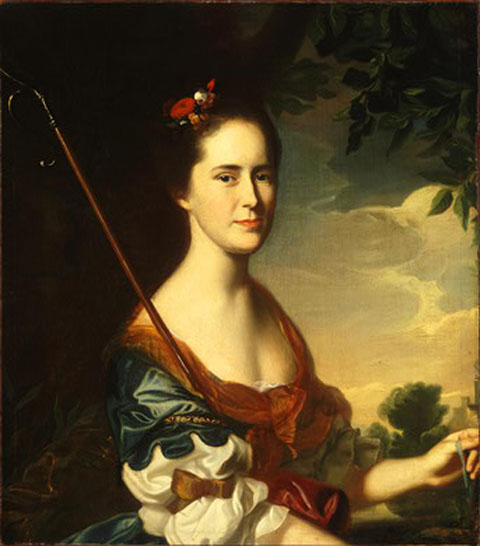
Elizabeth Gray Otis, wife of Samuel Allyne Otis

Others noticed and several coveted his increasingly influential job. Among the contenders was William Jackson, a secretary to President Washington. Jackson asked Washington to advance his prospects by removing Otis from the scene—through an appointment to a federal post in Massachusetts. Washington failed to cooperate, perhaps thinking that John Adams might view this as executive meddling in legislative affairs. From 1789 to 1801—the period of Adams' eight years as Vice President, and four as President—Otis enjoyed great job security. The situation changed in 1801. The electoral "Revolution of 1800", which shifted control of Congress and the presidency from the Adams Federalists to the Jeffersonian Republicans, gave Otis reason to begin checking his retirement options. When John Quincy Adams became a senator in 1803, he reported to his father that Otis "is much alarmed at the prospect of being removed from office. It has been signified to him that in order to retain it, he must have all the [Senate's] printing done by [William] Duane [editor of an anti-Adams newspaper]. His compliance may possibly preserve him one session longer." The Senate subsequently awarded Duane the lucrative contract.

Through the considerable political turbulence between 1800 and 1814, Samuel Otis held on as Secretary. But with the passing years, Otis appeared to some as less vigorous in attending to his duties. Senators complained that the Senate Journal was not being kept up to date, official communications not recorded in a timely way, and records kept in a "blind confused manner" – but no one actively moved to replace him. Like Continental Congress Secretary Charles Thomson, Otis had become the body's institutional memory at a time of great turnover among members.

When the seventy-three-year-old Otis died on April 22, 1814, having not missed a single day's work in twenty-five years, senators seemed to truly lament his death. The stability that he brought to the office endured well into the nineteenth century. His successor, former New Hampshire Senator Charles Cutts, served for eleven years. Cutts' successor, former Pennsylvania Senator Walter Lowrie, held the post from 1825 to 1836, followed by Asbury Dickins, who came within six months of breaking Otis' still-standing quarter-century service record. When Dickins retired in 1861 at age eighty, the Senate voted him an additional year's salary, using language that would have been equally fitting for Otis – "an old and faithful servant of the Senate."

== Children and siblings ==
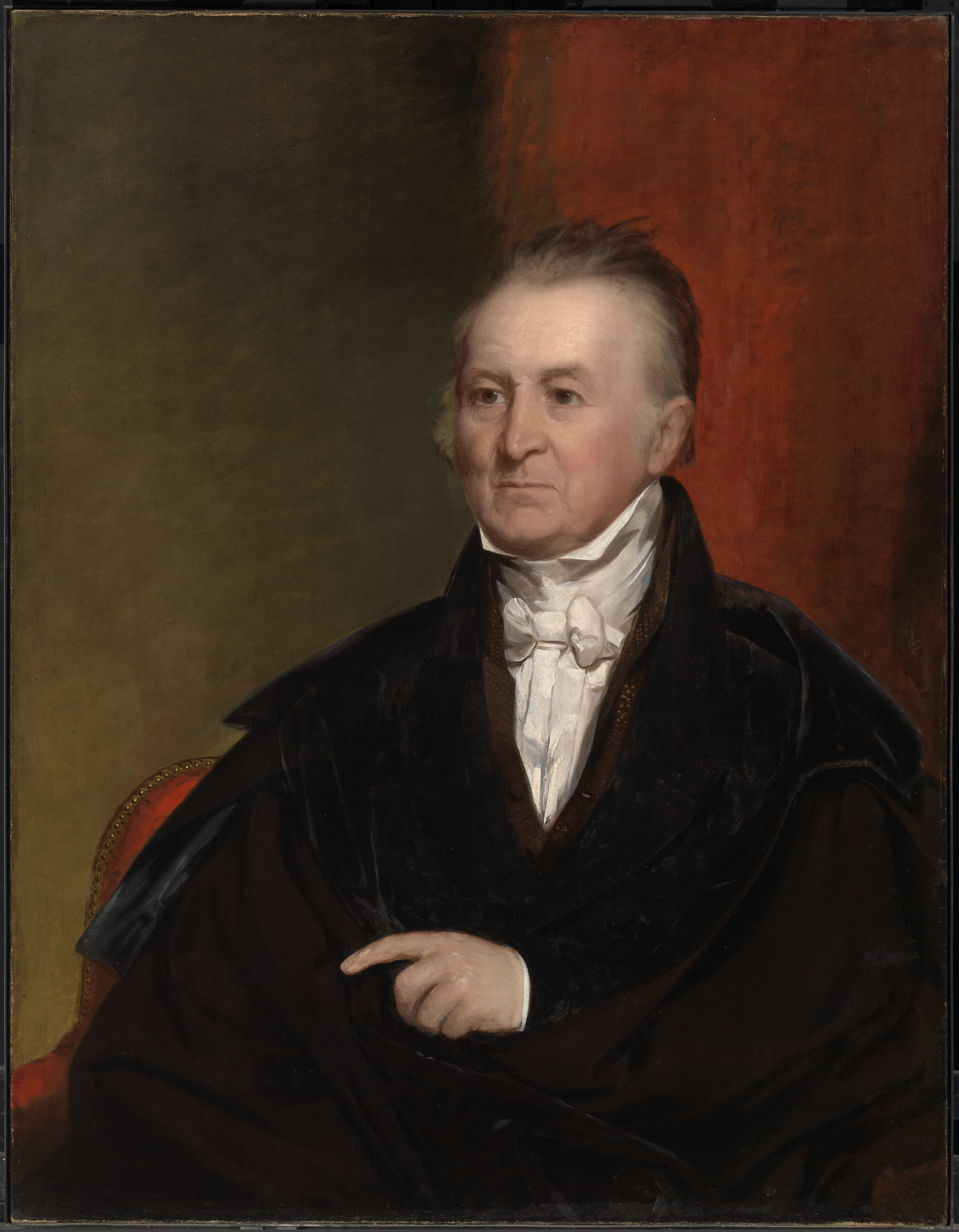
Harrison Gray Otis

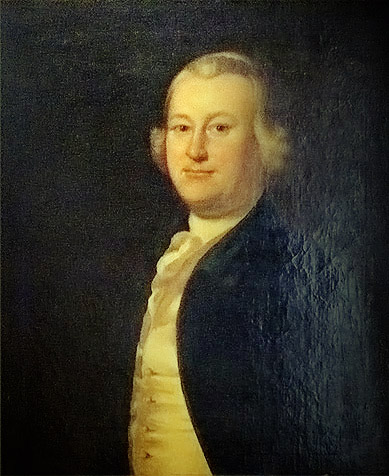
James Otis, Jr.

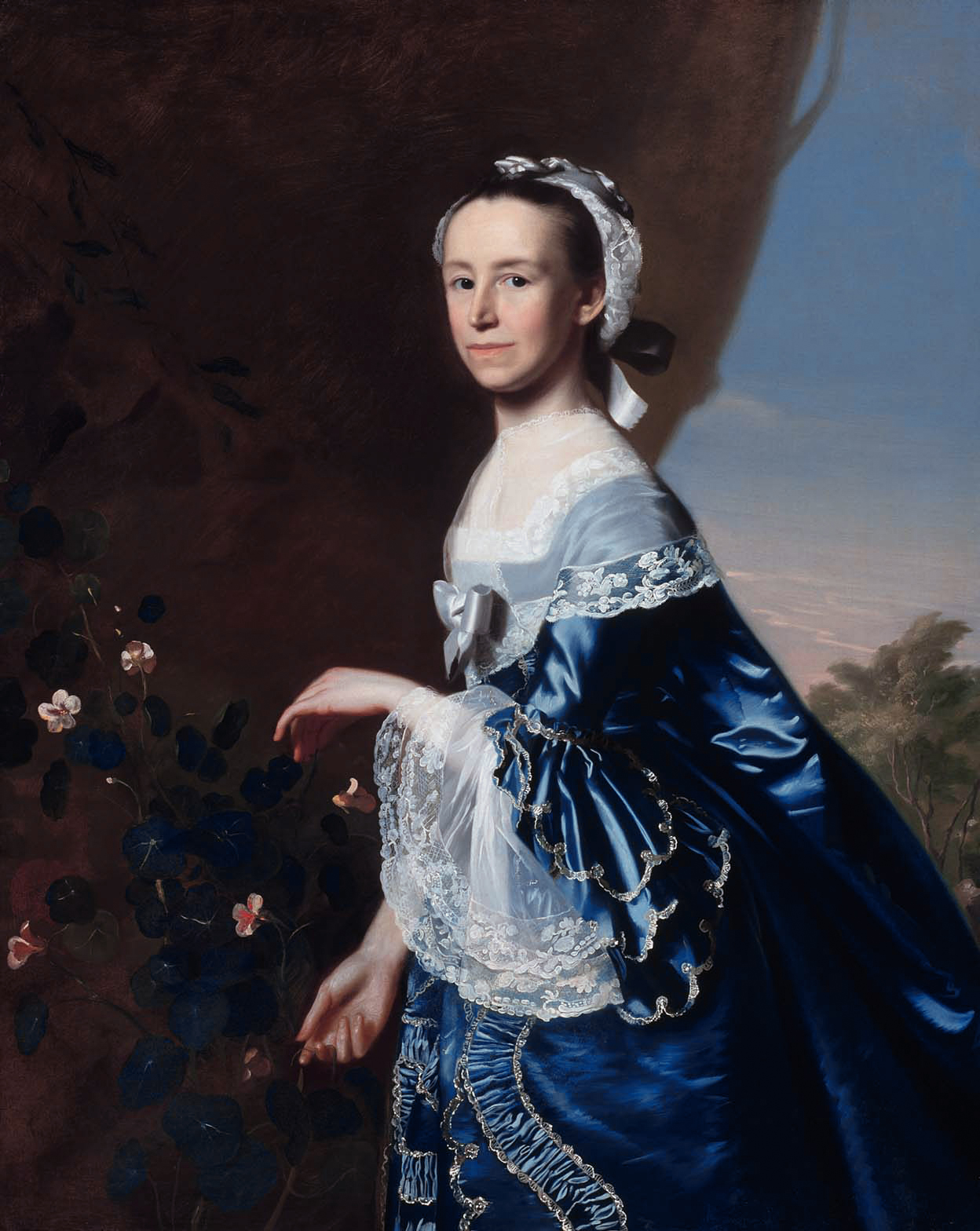
Mercy Otis Warren
