= Kamil Abdul Rahim =

Egyptian diplomat and businessman (1897–1966)

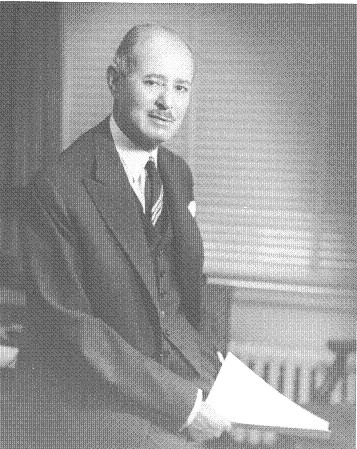
Ambassador Kamil Abdul Rahim

Kamil Abdul Rahim (Arab: كامل عبد الرحيم) (October 20, 1897 – February 3, 1966) was a career diplomat and a businessman.

== Early life ==
Kamil Abdul Rahim earned a Bachelor's and Master's degrees in Political Science & Economics from the University of Cambridge, England, as well as an L.L.B Faculty of Law from Cairo University.

== Career ==
1964–1955: Ambassador Extraordinary & Plenipotentiary of the Arab League at the United Nations, Director of the Arab Information Center in the United States.

1952: Doctor of Law, Rollins College, Florida.

1951: Appointed by the Egyptian government to sign the Peace Treaty with Japan at the War Memorial in San Francisco on September 8, 1951.

1950: Chief Delegate of Egypt and President to the International Civil Aviation Organization in Montreal, Canada.

1953: Members of the U.S. Congress mentioned Rahim as a possible candidate for the U.N. Secretary General.

1954–1948: Ambassador Extraordinary & Plenipotentiary to the United States. Chief Delegate and Permanent Representative of Egypt for the 5th session of the United Nations Assembly.

1948–1946: Ambassador Plenipotentiary Under Secretary of State for the Ministry of Foreign Affairs.

1944–1946: Minister Plenipotentiary to the Soviet Union. First diplomat to establish diplomatic relations between Egypt and the Soviet Union.

1942–1944: Minister Plenipotentiary to Turkey.

1939–1942: Various assignments in the Ministry of Foreign Affairs.

1936–1938: Chargé d'Affaires in Poland.

1934–1936: Director of Budgets, Ministry of Finance.

1932–1934: Engaged in private business, founded the Egyptian Petroleum Co-Operative.

1930–1931: Director, Bureau of Commercial Relations, Ministry of Commerce and Industry.

1929–1931: Various government assignments, participated in the Henderson-Mahmoud Pasha Negotiations of the Anglo-Egyptian Treaty.

=== Accomplishments ===
Rahim published The Hearts Cure: Selected verses from the Holy Kuran Traditions of the Prophet Muhammed, established two social welfare programs for the underprivileged and orphans, and was influential in establishing and building the mosque at the Islamic Center of Washington.

== Personal life ==
Ambassador Rahim was married to the daughter of Mohamed Mahmoud Pasha, former prime minister of Egypt and, was the father of Hussein Rahim, who married Eugenie Sigourney Thayer, the daughter of Sigourney Thayer (1896–1944) and Mary "Molly" Van Rensselaer Cogswell (1902–1983). Hussein attended Sidwell Friends School in Washington, D.C., graduated from Harvard in 1955, and worked at the United Nations Secretariat in New York.
