= Otis family =

American political dynasty

Otis
- Current region: New England; United States East Coast
- Earlier spellings: Otis, Oates, Otties, Oattis
- Origin: Kingdom of England (now part of the United Kingdom)
- Members: James Otis Jr. Mercy Otis Warren; Harrison Gray Otis (Senator); Harrison Gray Otis (General); Samuel Eliot Morison; Amelia Earhart
- Estate: Harrison Gray Otis House

The Otis family is a Boston Brahmin family from Massachusetts best known for its involvement in early American politics.

== History ==
The family was originally landowning farmers of Glastonbury, Somerset, the Otises went to New England during the Puritan migration of the 1630s settling first in Hingham before finally moving to Barnstable. It was there that John Otis built a homestead that served many members of the family for generations. Although not much is known about John Otis, his son, John Otis (generally referred to as "Judge Otis") was the first of the family to rise to provincial eminence. Judge Otis held a variety of judicial and military appointments and represented Barnstable County for 20 successive years in the general court of Massachusetts Bay. In 1708, he was chosen a member of Her Majesty's Council (at the time, the highest position a native could achieve) and was annually reelected until his death in 1727. He left six children, of whom the following are descendants:

== Members ==
- James Otis, Sr. (1702–1778), prominent colonial lawyer, Attorney General of the Massachusetts Bay Province, Colonel Massachusetts Militia.
  - James Otis, Jr. (1725–1783), prominent lawyer and patriot.
  - Mercy Otis Warren (1728–1814), American writer and playwright. Known as the "Conscience of the American Revolution".
  - Samuel Allyne Otis (1740–1814), Speaker of the Massachusetts General Court; Representative to the Second Continental Congress; First Secretary of the United States Senate; Son of James Otis, Sr. and father of Harrison Gray Otis.
    - Harrison Gray Otis (1765–1848), U.S. Senator from Massachusetts; Third Mayor of Boston; U.S. Representative from Massachusetts; Massachusetts District Attorney; Son of Samuel Allyne Otis.
- Harrison Gray Otis (publisher) (1837–1917), Publisher of the Los Angeles Times, Brigadier General United States Army, delegate to the Republican National Convention 1860. Married Eliza Ann Otis.
  - Marian Otis Chandler (1866–1952), Born Emma Marian Otis. Was the daughter of General Harrison Gray Otis and Secretary of the Times-Mirror Company (formerly the publishing company of the Los Angeles Times). Married Harry Chandler.
    - Norman Chandler (1899–1973), Publisher of the Los Angeles Times. Grandson of Harrison Gray Otis.
      - Otis Chandler (1927–2006), Publisher of the Los Angeles Times (1960 and 1980) and great-grandson of Harrison Gray Otis
- Elwell Stephen Otis (1838–1909), United States of America General who served in the Philippines late in the Spanish–American War and during the Philippine–American War.
- Elisha Otis (1811–1861), founder of Otis Elevator Company, inventor of safety device that prevented elevators from falling if hoisting cable broke.
- Samuel Eliot Morison (1887–1976) Rear Admiral, United States Naval Reserve; Prominent American historian; received numerous honors including two Pulitzer Prizes, two Bancroft Prizes, and the Presidential Medal of Freedom. Descendant of U.S. Senator and lawyer Harrison Gray Otis.
- Franklin Otis Booth, Jr. (1923–2008), Billionaire Los Angeles Times executive and Berkshire Hathaway investor. Great-grandson of Gen. Harrison Gray Otis.
- Montgomery Harrison Wadsworth Ritchie (1910–1999), Businessman and cattle rancher. Descendant of Harrison Gray Otis.
- Robert H. Thayer (1901–1984), U.S. Minister to Romania 1955–1957, delegate to the Republican National Convention 1936, candidate for U.S. Representative from New York 1946. Great-great-great-grandson of Samuel Allyne Otis.
- John Otis (1801–1856), Maine State Representative 1841 1846–1847, Maine State Senator 1842, U.S. Representative from Maine 1849–1851. Second cousin twice removed of Samuel Allyne Otis.
- James Otis (1826–1875), Mayor of San Francisco, California 1873–1875. Second cousin twice removed of Samuel Allyne Otis.
- John G. Otis (1838–1916), U.S. Representative from Kansas 1891–1893. Son of Harris F. Otis.
- Norton P. Otis (1840–1905), Mayor of Yonkers, New York 1880–1882; New York Assemblyman 1884; candidate for U.S. Representative from New York 1900; U.S. Representative from New York 1903–1905. Second cousin thrice removed of Samuel Allyne Otis.
- Amelia Earhart (1897–1937), noted American aviation pioneer, and author.

== Affiliated U.S. cities and institutions ==
- Otis, Massachusetts, Officially incorporated in 1810, the town was created when the unincorporated town of Loudon annexed the adjacent District of Bethlehem in 1809. It was named after Harrison Gray Otis, an influential lawyer, financier, and politician in revolutionary Massachusetts.
- East Otis, Massachusetts, part of the town of Otis, Massachusetts. Otis Reservoir is located primarily within its limits.
- Harrison, Maine, Incorporated March 8, 1805, it was named after principal landowner, Harrison Gray Otis of Boston, the heir of James Otis.
- Otisfield, Maine, Granted by the Massachusetts General Court on June 15, 1771, to James Otis, Nathaniel Gorham and other descendants of Captain John Gorham and certain members of his company who had fought in the 1690 Battle of Quebec.
- Otis, Maine, a town in Hancock County, Maine, United States. The population was 543 at the 2000 census.
- Otis Reservoir, a 1,085 acre reservoir located primarily in Otis, Massachusetts.
- Los Angeles Times, a daily newspaper published in Los Angeles, California and distributed throughout the Western United States. It is the second-largest metropolitan newspaper in the United States and the fourth-most widely distributed newspaper in the United States. Army General Harrison Gray Otis bought the paper in 1884 to form the Times-Mirror Company which eventually merged with the Tribune Company in 2000.
- Otis Elevator Company, is the world's largest manufacturer of vertical transportation systems today, principally elevators and escalators. Founded in Yonkers, New York, USA in 1853 by Elisha Otis, the company pioneered the development of the safety elevator, invented by Otis, which used a special mechanism to lock the elevator car in place should the hoisting ropes fail.
- Otis Air National Guard Base, is an Air National Guard installation located within the Massachusetts Military Reservation (MMR), a military training facility, located on the upper western portion of Cape Cod, bordering the towns of Bourne, Falmouth and Sandwich, Barnstable County, Massachusetts, United States.
- Otis College of Art and Design, has been long considered one of the major art institutions in California. Otis began in 1918, when Los Angeles Times founder Harrison Gray Otis bequeathed his MacArthur Park property to start the first public, independent professional school of art in Southern California.
- Harrison Gray Otis House, There are three houses named the Harrison Gray Otis House that were designed by Charles Bulfinch for politician Harrison Gray Otis.
- Amelia Earhart Birthplace Museum, The Birthplace of Amelia Earhart. It was once the home of her Grandfather, Kansas Judge Alfred Gideon Otis.

== See also ==
- List of United States political families
