= St. Mark's School (Massachusetts) =

School in Southborough, Massachusetts, US

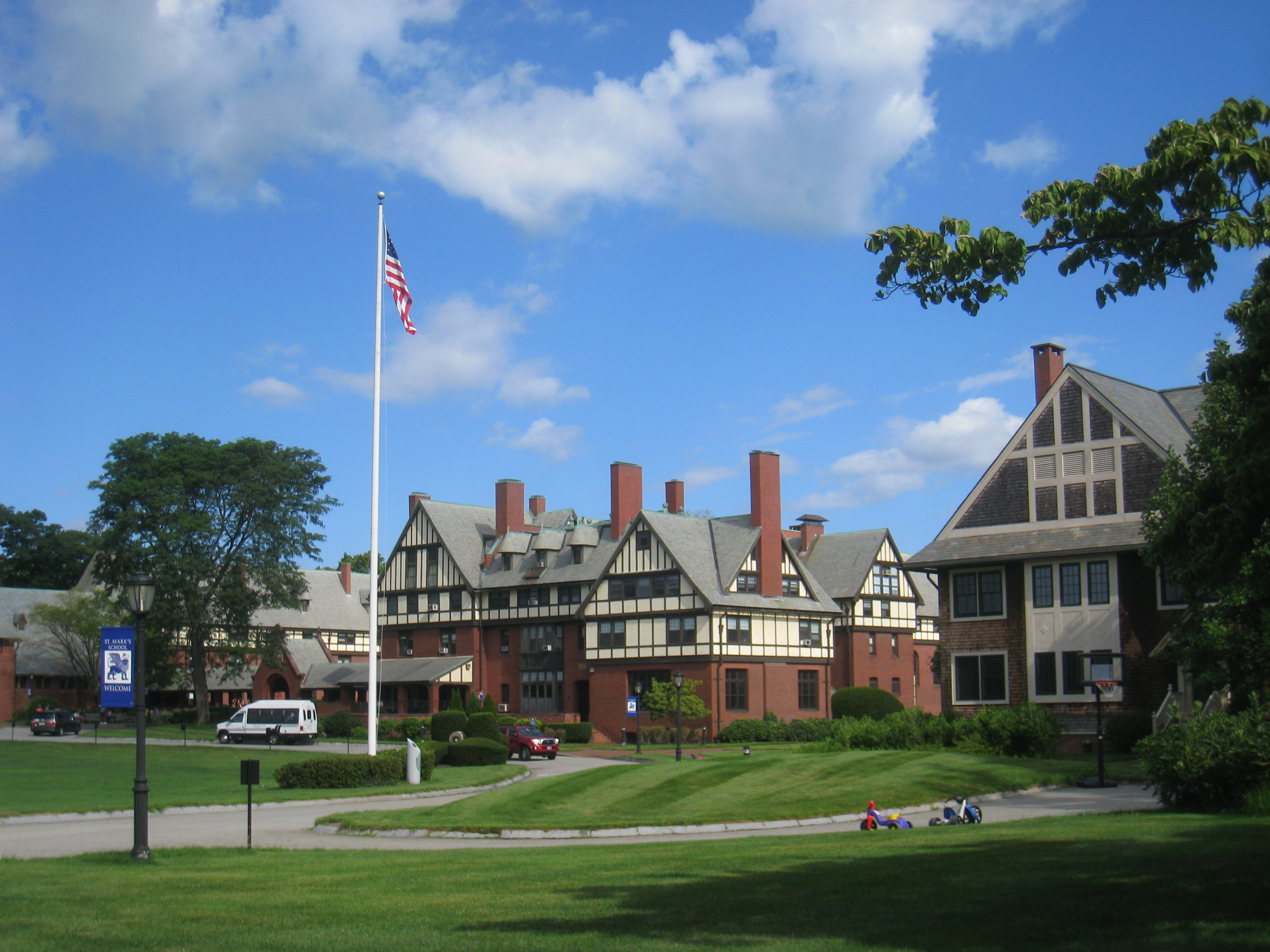
- St. Mark's School in August 2010

Location
- 25 Marlboro Road; Southborough, Massachusetts; United States; 42.31°N 71.53°W

Information
- Type: Private day and boarding school
- Motto: Age Quod Agis literal translation: "Do What You Do", figurative translation: "Drive because you are driven".
- Established: 1865
- Founder: Joseph Burnett
- Head of school: Ivory D. Hills
- Chaplain: Katrina Solter
- Grades: 9–12
- Enrollment: 377 (2023–2024)
- Campus: Suburban
- Colors: Navy blue and white
- Mascot: Winged Lion
- Nickname: Lions
- Rival: Groton School
- Accreditation: NEASC
- Website: www.stmarksschool.org

St. Mark's School is an Episcopal college-preparatory day and boarding school in Southborough, Massachusetts, a suburb of Boston. Founded in 1865, it was one of the first British-style boarding schools in the United States.

St. Mark's educates 377 students, 75% of whom reside on campus. The school has a 4:1 student-faculty ratio, and 30% of the students are on financial aid.

== History ==
=== Early days ===
St. Mark's was founded in 1865 by Southborough native Joseph Burnett, a chemist and entrepreneur who amassed a large fortune manufacturing surgical anesthetic, cough syrup, hair tonic, cologne, soda, sausages, bottled milk, and most famously America's first commercially viable vanilla extract. Burnett was a major civic leader: in addition to establishing St. Mark's, he bankrolled the town's Episcopal church, town hall, library, and its other private school, Fay School (a junior high). He also helped establish Boston's Church of the Advent.

Along with St. Paul's School in Concord, New Hampshire, St. Mark's was one of the first New England schools founded on the British public school model, as opposed to Revolutionary-era academies like Andover and Exeter. The resemblance was intentional, as Burnett had sent his eldest son to St. Paul's. The Concord school was filled to capacity, and to relieve pressure on its admissions office, its headmaster encouraged Burnett to start a school of his own. St. Mark's started with twelve students and steadily grew, reaching 47 students by 1878 and 60 students by 1883. New York financier August Belmont Sr. was an early supporter of the school, and his son August Belmont Jr. (a St. Mark's alumnus and trustee) eventually donated the school chapel and football field.

=== Evolution into college-preparatory institution ===
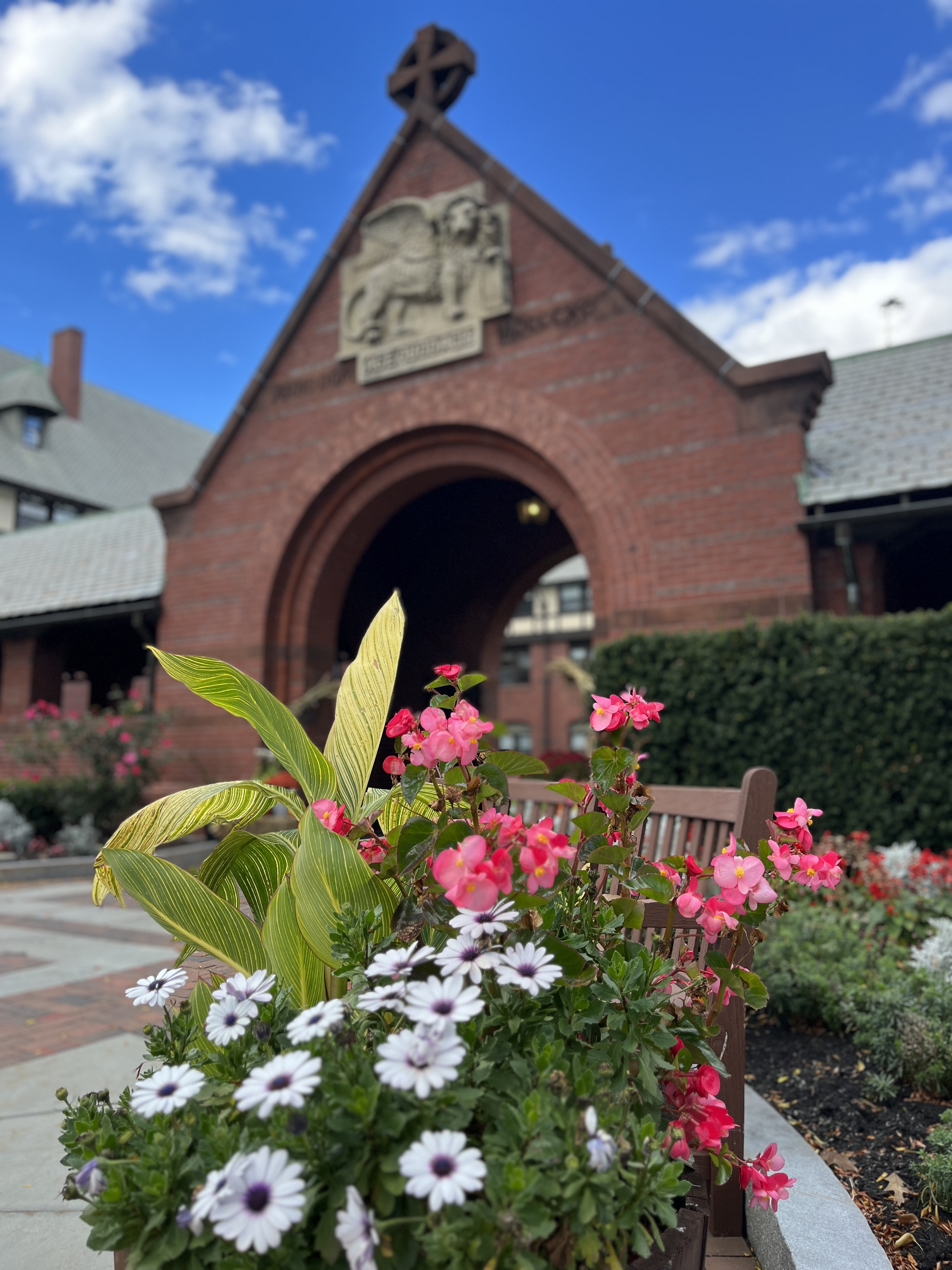
The Main Building

In 1882, William Peck became the headmaster of St. Mark's. He rapidly expanded enrollment and recruited the sons of some of America's richest families. In 1886, the school announced that it had outgrown its facilities and could not accept any more applicants. It moved into a new school building in 1890, which allowed enrollment to increase to 103 students; St. Mark's still uses this building today.

The school endured a severe crisis in 1894, when Peck resigned to start Pomfret School in Connecticut. The staunchly Episcopalian board of trustees clashed with Peck, a layman with (according to Pomfret) "progressive tendencies." Peck took half the faculty and a third of the student body with him. Joseph Burnett died that same year, robbing the school of its most important benefactor.

The St. Mark's trustees responded to this crisis by appointing Groton School English teacher William Greenough Thayer as the new headmaster. Not coincidentally, Bishop William Lawrence was president of the board of both St. Mark's and Groton. Lawrence was one of Thayer's early mentors: he influenced him to convert from Presbyterianism to Episcopalianism, and led him to the Episcopalian ministry. A "tireless fundraiser," Lawrence would later lead Harvard University's first capital campaign in 1904 and raise the money for the Harvard Business School campus in 1926. Thayer's relationship with Lawrence gave St. Mark's access to the bishop's vast network of donors.

Thayer ran the school for the next thirty-six years. He revived and then accelerated St. Mark's institutional trajectory under Peck, building St. Mark's into a distinctly upper-class institution that commanded loyalty "from Boston and the Knickerbocker families of New York." He continued Peck's project of recruiting the sons of American business titans, adding William Kissam Vanderbilt and Joseph Pulitzer to the parent list. A study of the St. Mark's class of 1906 found that 79% of the graduates' fathers were listed in the Social Register; 59% had attended Ivy League schools; and 54% worked in finance, law, or other professional services. Thayer also built a strong pipeline to Harvard College; from 1906 to 1925, an average of fifteen St. Mark's students went on to Harvard every year. (A future headmaster, Edward T. Hall '37, recalled that at the time, colleges "were for the most part willing to accept any boys who could pass the [College] Boards and whose fathers could pay the tuition," so "[s]trong boarding schools[] with capable disciplinarians who knew their subjects ... enjoyed phenomenal success in getting their students into any college they chose.")

As the school grew in stature, its enrollment rapidly increased, bouncing back to 131 in 1906 and 191 in 1926. Competition for places was fierce, and Thayer estimated that he received 145 or more applicants for 30–35 openings a year. Edward Hall recalled that "[e]xcept for a handful (it was seven in 1927) of competitive places, priority of application governed likelihood of acceptance. Getting into St. Mark's in the 1920s was a little like getting into the Somerset Club of Boston: a boy's name was put down within hours or days of his birth if he was to have a chance of acceptance."

=== Modernization ===
Thayer retired in 1930. He was allowed to pick his successor, and chose Francis Parkman '15, a former administrator at Harvard College. Parkman reformed the admissions system. He increased the number of students admitted by competitive examination to ten and based the remaining admissions on a mixture of factors, which still included priority of application but also interviews and geographic diversity. However, he was not a natural fundraiser, which was becoming an increasingly important skill for boarding school headmasters, particularly during the worst periods of the Great Depression, when many St. Mark's families encountered financial difficulties and turned to the school for financial aid. Parkman resigned in 1942 and joined the U.S. Army Air Corps during World War II. After the war, he joined the predecessor of the National Association of Independent Schools; when NAIS was created, he became its first president.

William Brewster (h. 1943–48) made the first concerted attempts to change the school's image as an institution of social elites. He increased the number of financial aid students, although he initially did not condition aid awards on academic achievement. He was quickly forced to change course, as college admissions were becoming increasingly competitive, and the 1945–46 school year was the first year that a St. Mark's diploma no longer guaranteed students admission to the college of their choice. In April 1946, the school adopted a policy of awarding financial aid based on scholastic promise, financial need, and geographic distribution. Finding the money to fund a financial aid program was another matter; the school's endowment traditionally lagged its peers', and in 1955 only 11% of the school was on scholarship. In 1956 Brewster's successor William Barber Jr. '28 (h. 1948–68) hired a professional fundraising firm to manage a full-scale fundraising campaign, which more than doubled the size of the school's endowment.

St. Mark's began accepting day students in 1944, black students in 1962 (the first black student to matriculate arrived in 1964), and female students in 1977. In the 1960s, the school took its first steps towards coeducation by agreeing to move the all-girls St. Margaret's School in Waterbury, Connecticut to Southborough; St. Mark's hoped that St. Margaret's would accommodate female students who wished to attend St. Mark's but could not due to the boys-only policy in force at the time. However, the Connecticut legislature torpedoed the plans. The St. Margaret's leadership moved to Southborough anyway and established Southborough School in 1972 to serve as St. Mark's sister school instead. The two schools formally merged five years later.

=== Recent years ===
In the 21st century, St. Mark's has focused on expanding its facilities and raising money for teacher salaries and student financial aid. The school completed a $50 million fundraising campaign in 2002 and a $112 million fundraising campaign in 2022. In 2012, the school issued a $25 million bond to renovate its student center and build a new STEM building. In 2021, the school issued a $48 million bond to build a new dormitory housing 150 students, which opened in 2022.

St. Mark's was a major filming location for Alexander Payne's 2023 film The Holdovers, standing in for the fictional Barton Academy. The production team shot footage in the dining hall, headmaster's office, and basketball court. Although the St. Mark's campus has been modernized since the 1970s (when the movie is set), anachronistic fixtures were temporarily removed to accommodate the production crew.

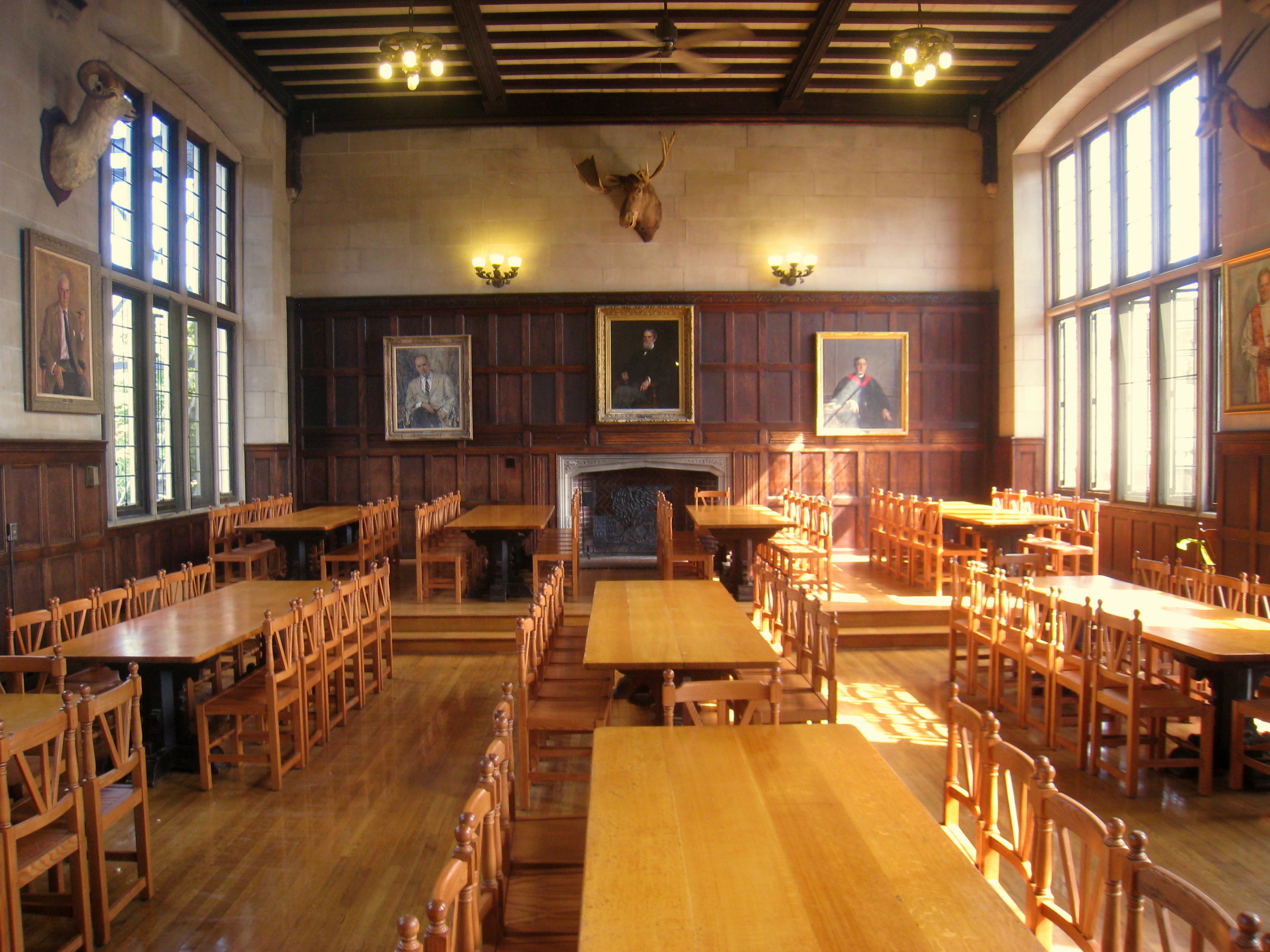
Dining Hall (featured in The Holdovers)

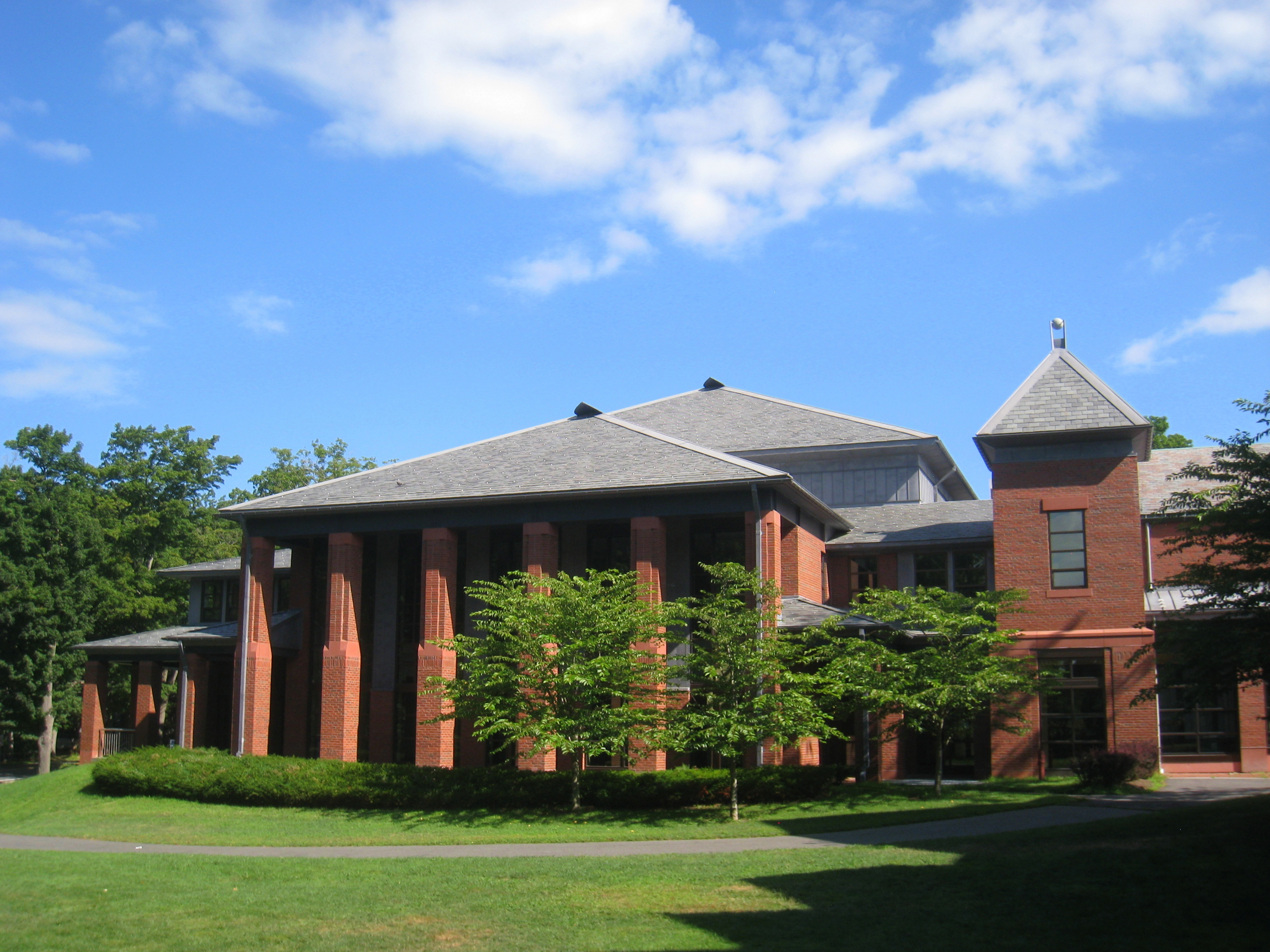
Performing Arts Center

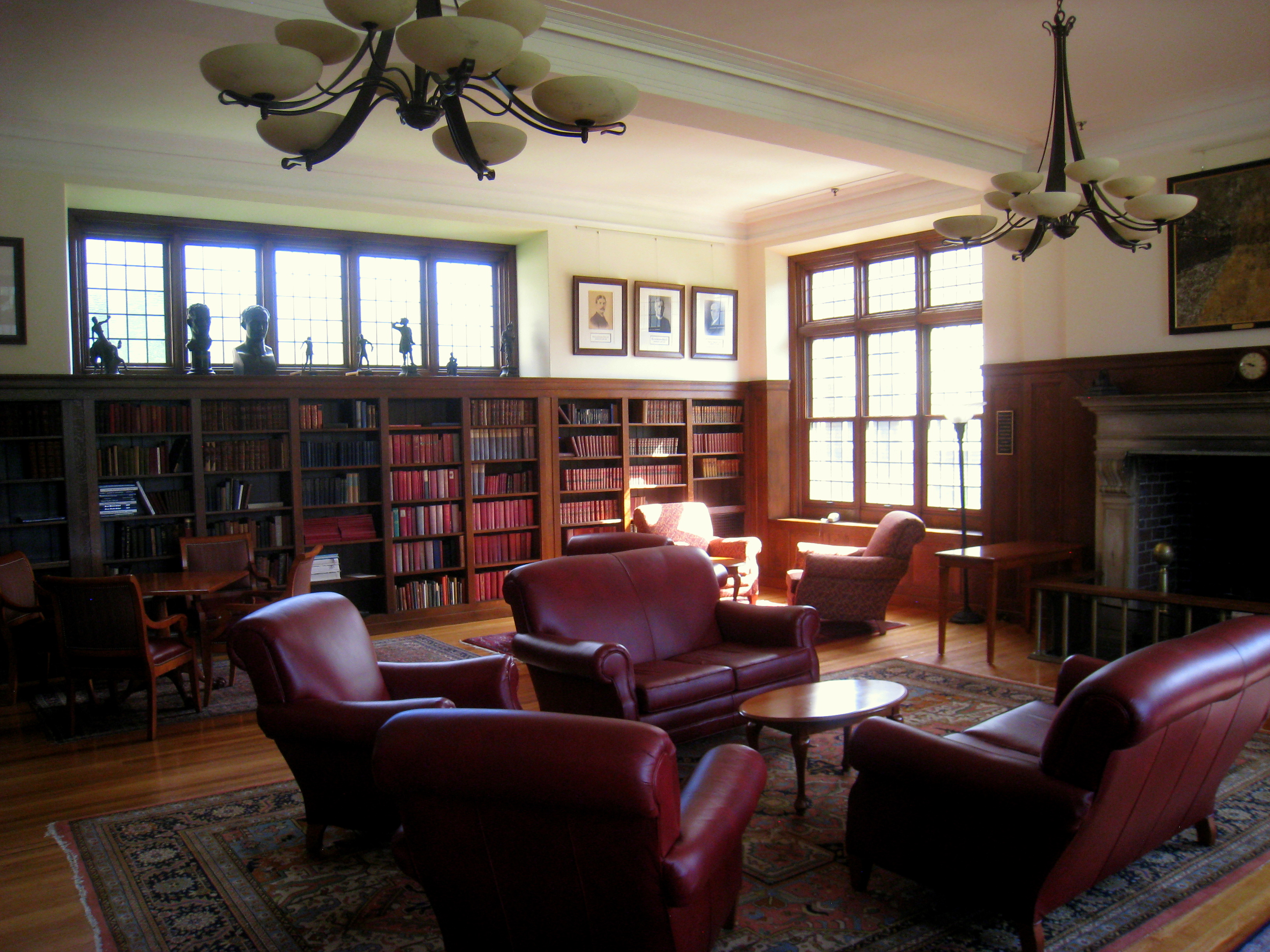
Faculty Room (featured in The Holdovers)

== Finances ==
=== Tuition and financial aid ===
Tuition and fees for the 2023–2024 academic year are $72,930 for boarding students and $58,080 for day students. 30% of the student body is on financial aid. In the 2021–2022 school year, the average financial aid grant was $55,400.

=== Endowment and expenses ===
St. Mark's financial endowment stood at $150.1 million as of June 30, 2022. In its Internal Revenue Service filings for the 2021–22 school year, St. Mark's reported total assets of $236.8 million, net assets of $185.8 million, investment holdings of $146.9 million, and cash holdings of $13.3 million. St. Mark's also reported $29.8 million in program service expenses and $6.0 million in grants (primarily student financial aid).

== Leadership ==
Dr. Ivory D. Hills is St. Mark's current head of school. Prior to coming to St. Mark's, Dr. Hills was the faculty dean at Deerfield Academy. Dr. Hills succeeds John C. Warren '74, who served as head of school from 2006 through June 2024.

=== Full list of Heads of School ===
- John Kerfoot Lewis, 1865–1866
- George Herbert Patterson, 1866–1869
- Robert Traill Spence Lowell, 1869–1873
- William Ivers Trecothick Coolidge, 1873–1882
- William Edward Peck, 1882–1894
- William Greenough Thayer, 1894–1930
- Francis Parkman '15, 1930–1942
- William Brewster, 1943–1948
- William Wyatt Barber Jr. '28, 1948–1968
- Edward Tuck Hall '37, 1968–1974
- Robert Raymond Hansel, 1974–1977
- William Evill (interim), 1977–1978
- Mark Barlow Jr., 1978–1988
- Christopher T. Mabley, 1988–1994
- Antony J. de V. Hill, 1994–2006
- Elsa N. Hill, 1996–2006
- John C. Warren '74, 2006–2024
- Ivory D. Hills, 2024–

== Athletics ==
St. Mark's is a member of the Independent School League, previously known as the Private School League. St. Mark's and Groton began playing an annual football game in 1886; they contest the fifth-oldest high school football rivalry in the United States.

St. Mark's has educated several Olympic athletes, including Truxtun Hare in track and field (also one of only four four-time College Football All-Americans), Suzanne King in cross-country skiing, Scott Young and Greg Brown in ice hockey, and Chris Sahs in rowing.

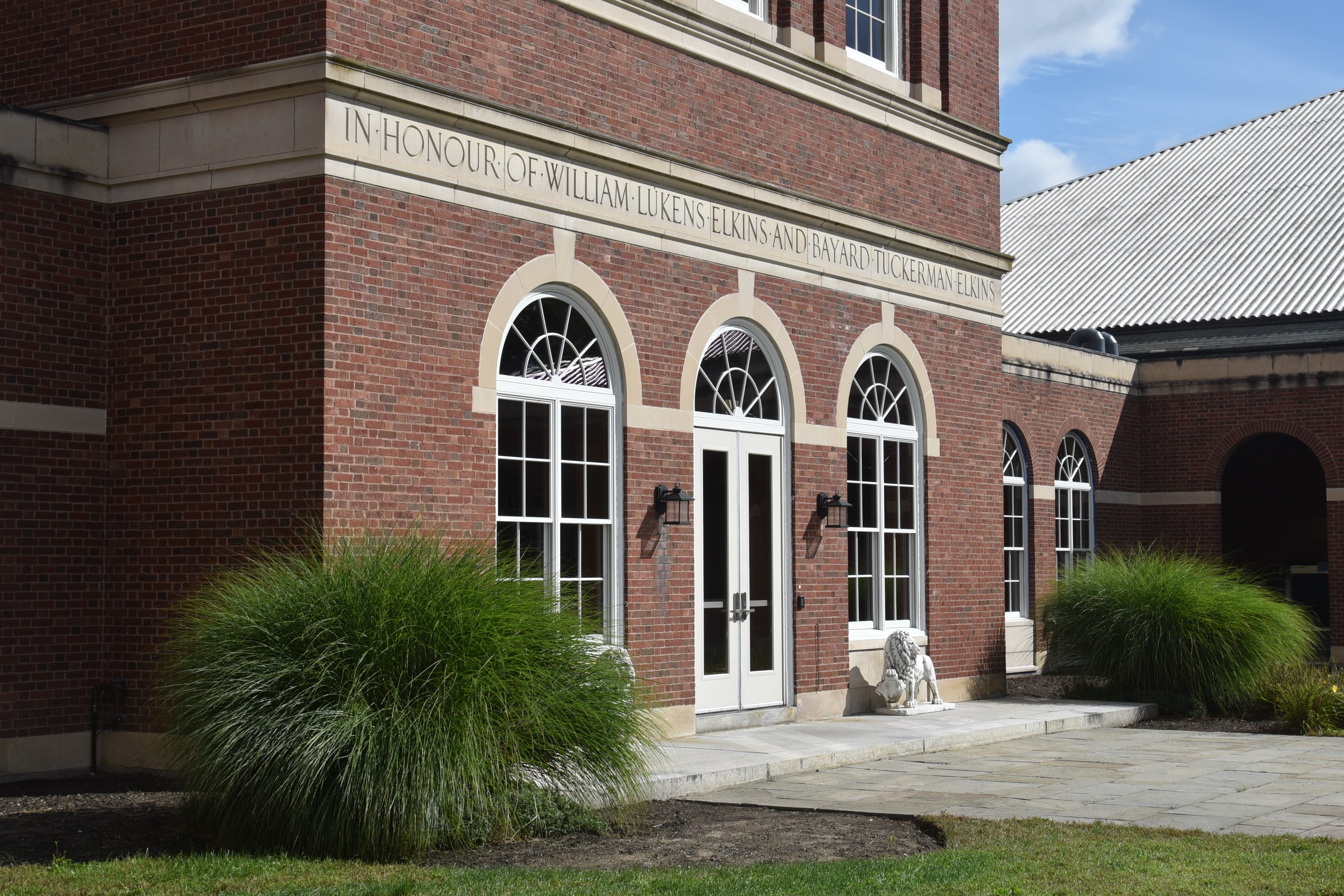
Elkins Athletic Building

The boys' ice hockey team won New England championships in 1992, 2015, and 2016; ISL Eberhart Division championships in 1976, 2001, 2002, 2003, 2015, 2020, and 2022; and ISL/Private School League Championships in 1959, 1960, 1961, 1962, 1981, 1982, 1983, 1984, 1985, 1986, 1987, 1988, 1989, 1990, 1991, 1992, 1993, 1994, 1997, 1998, 1999, and 2000. Alumni have gone on to careers in the National Hockey League.

In 2006 and 2007, St. Mark's boys' cross-country team was the New England Division IV Champion, while the girls' cross-country team was the runner-up in 2007. After finishing second in the New England championships in 2008, 2009, and 2010, St. Mark's boys' cross-country had an undefeated season in 2011 and went on to win the ISL Championships and New England Division II Championship. St. Mark's boys' cross-country replicated this feat in 2013, capturing the ISL and New England Championships.

The girls' field hockey team won the New England championship in 1992, 1997, 2012, and 2013.

The boys' basketball team won ISL/Private School League championships in 1951, 1954, 1972, 1999, 2006, 2008, 2009, 2011, and 2012, and were New England champions in 1972, 1973, 1999, 2006, 2008, 2009, 2012, and 2025.

== Notable faculty ==
- Richard Eberhart (1933-1941)
- W. H. Auden (1939)

== See also ==
- Saint Grottlesex
