= List of elections in 1819 =

The following elections occurred in the year 1819.

== Europe ==
- 1819 French legislative election

== North America ==
=== United States ===
==== United States lieutenant gubernatorial ====
- 1819 Connecticut lieutenant gubernatorial election

==== United States gubernatorial ====
- 1819 Alabama gubernatorial election
- 1819 Connecticut gubernatorial election
- 1819 Delaware gubernatorial election
- 1819 Georgia gubernatorial election
- 1819 Indiana gubernatorial election
- 1819 Maryland gubernatorial election
- 1819 Massachusetts gubernatorial election
- 1819 Mississippi gubernatorial election
- 1819 New Hampshire gubernatorial election
- 1819 New Jersey gubernatorial election
- 1819 North Carolina gubernatorial election
- 1819 Rhode Island gubernatorial election
- 1819 Tennessee gubernatorial election
- 1819 Vermont gubernatorial election
- 1819 Virginia gubernatorial election

==== United States Senate ====
- 1818 and 1819 United States Senate elections
- 1819 United States Senate elections in Maryland
- 1819–1820 United States Senate election in New York

==== United States House of Representatives ====
- 1818 and 1819 United States House of Representatives elections
- 1819 Alabama's at-large congressional district special election
- 1819 United States House of Representatives election in Arkansas Territory
- 1819 Delaware's at-large congressional district special election
- 1819 Indiana's at-large congressional district special election
- 1819 Kentucky's 5th congressional district special election
- 1819 Kentucky's 6th congressional district special election
- 1819 Maryland's 6th congressional district special election
- 1819 Massachusetts's 11th congressional district special election
- 1819 Massachusetts's 12th congressional district special election
- 1819 United States House of Representatives election in Michigan Territory
- 1819 New York's 4th congressional district special election
- 1819 North Carolina's 10th congressional district special election
- 1819 Ohio's 1st congressional district special election
- 1819 Ohio's 5th congressional district special election
- 1819 Ohio's 6th congressional district special election
- 1819 Pennsylvania's 6th congressional district special election
- 1819 Pennsylvania's 7th congressional district special election
- 1819 South Carolina's 7th congressional district special election
- 1819 Virginia's 11th congressional district special election

== See also ==
- Category:1819 elections
