= Sarah Bradlee Fulton =

American revolutionary spy (1740–1835)

- Born: December 24, 1740; Dorchester, Boston, British America
- Died: November 9, 1835 (aged 94); Medford, Massachusetts, U.S.
- Spouse: John Fulton

Sarah Bradlee Fulton (December 24, 1740, Dorchester - November 9, 1835, Medford) was an active participant of the Revolutionary War on the American side. A tablet stone was dedicated to her memory at the Salem Street Burying Ground in Medford, Massachusetts in 1900.

She was born in 1740 as Sarah Bradlee in Boston, Massachusetts, married John Fulton in 1762 and moved to Medford, Massachusetts. She was an active member of Daughters of Liberty and is sometimes referred to as the "Mother of the Boston Tea Party". Her brother, Nathaniel Bradlee, a carpenter, lived in Boston on the corner of Tremont and Hollis streets. Friends and neighbors, who were Boston's most devoted patriots, regularly gathered to enjoy his codfish suppers on Saturday nights. It was in Bradlee's carpenter shop, that a detachment of "Mohawks" who "turned Boston Harbor into a teapot" gathered on the night of the Boston Tea Party. Sarah Fulton and her sister-in-law, Mrs. Bradlee, are credited with disguising Nathanial Bradlee and his compatriots as Mohawks and, later, as transforming them back into "respectable Bostonians." A spy, hoping to catch Nathaniel Bradlee "in the act," peered into the window, saw the women going about their business, and thought nothing of it.

She was involved with the Revolutionary War on several occasions. In June 1775, after the Battle of Bunker Hill, the wounded were brought into town, and the large open space by Wade's Tavern was turned into a field hospital. Because few surgeons were available, the women did their best as nurses. Among them, Sarah Fulton became a leader. She tended to one poor fellow who had a bullet in his cheek. With steady nerves, she removed the bullet and almost forgot about it until years afterwards, when the patriot came to thank her for her service.

In March 1776, Major John Brooks came to the house of John Fulton, knowing his patriotism and his intimate knowledge of Boston, and asked him to deliver dispatches by General Washington which must be delivered inside the enemy's lines. When her husband was unable to do the job, she accepted. She dispatched an important message from John Brooks, the mayor of Medford, to George Washington to the Charlestown war front. She managed to cross the enemy lines and return home safe.

Still later, during the Siege of Boston, she and her husband used their own ship to provide the American troops in Medford with wood and fuel.

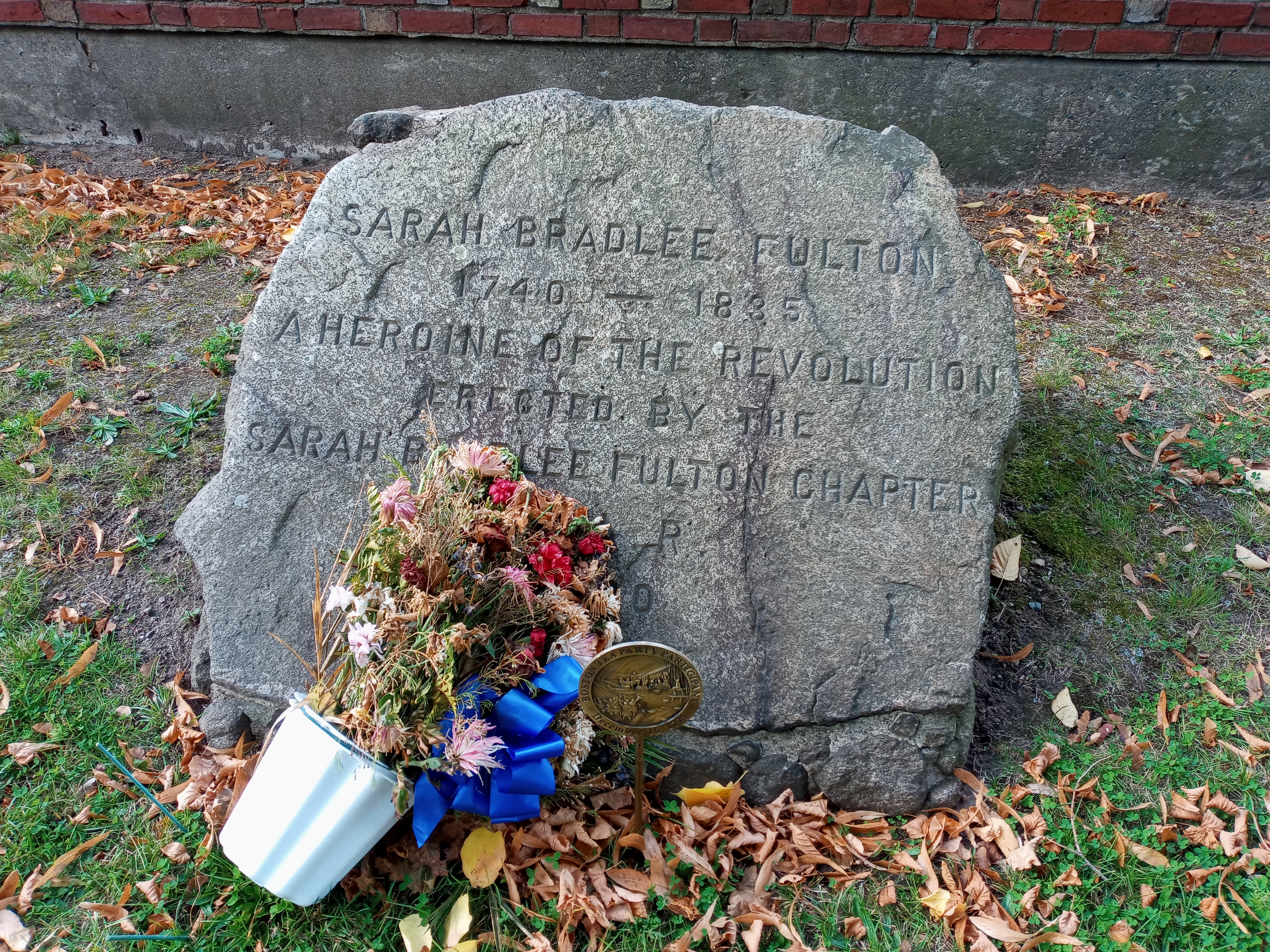
Sarah Bradlee Fulton stone in the Salem Street Burying Ground

A play Sarah Bradlee Fulton, Patriot: A Colonial Drama in Three Acts was written about her by Grace Jewett Austin in 1919.

== See also ==
- Intelligence operations in the American Revolutionary War
