= 1823 Massachusetts gubernatorial election =

- April 7, 1823
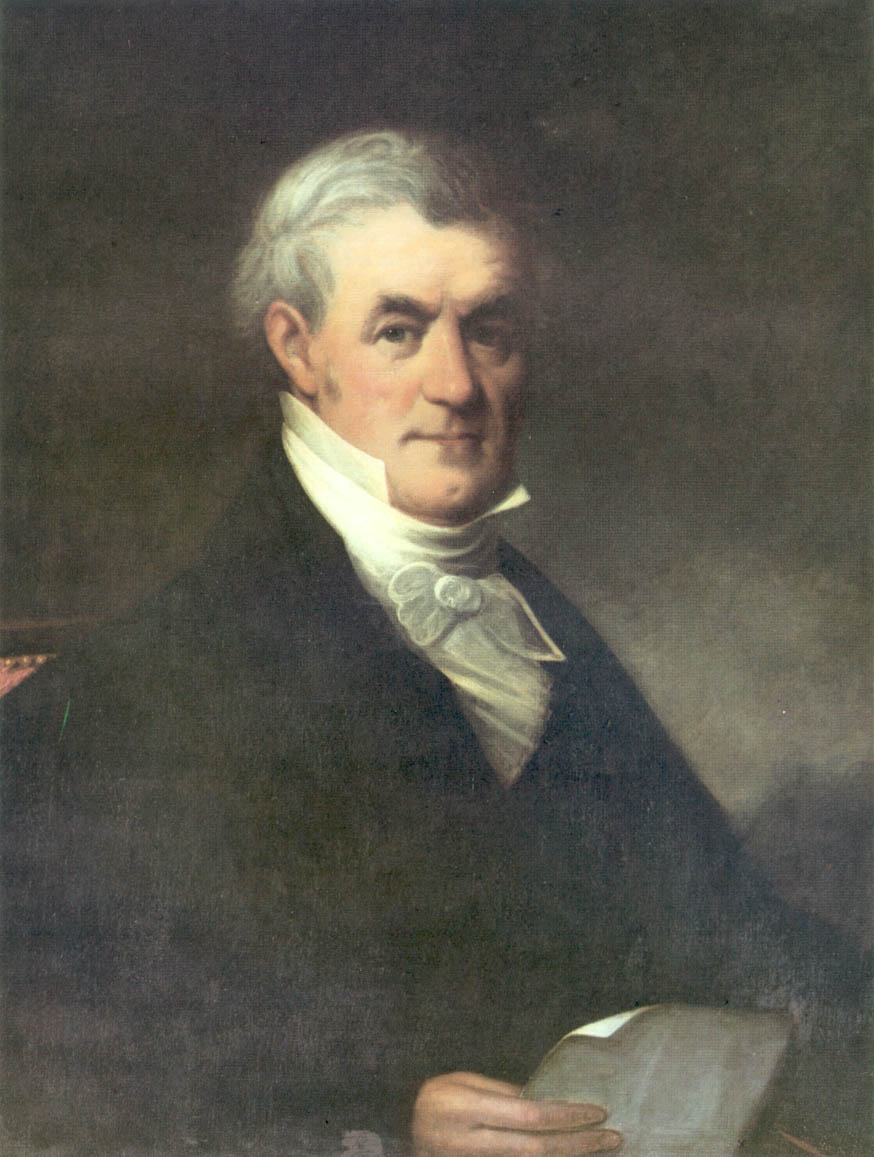

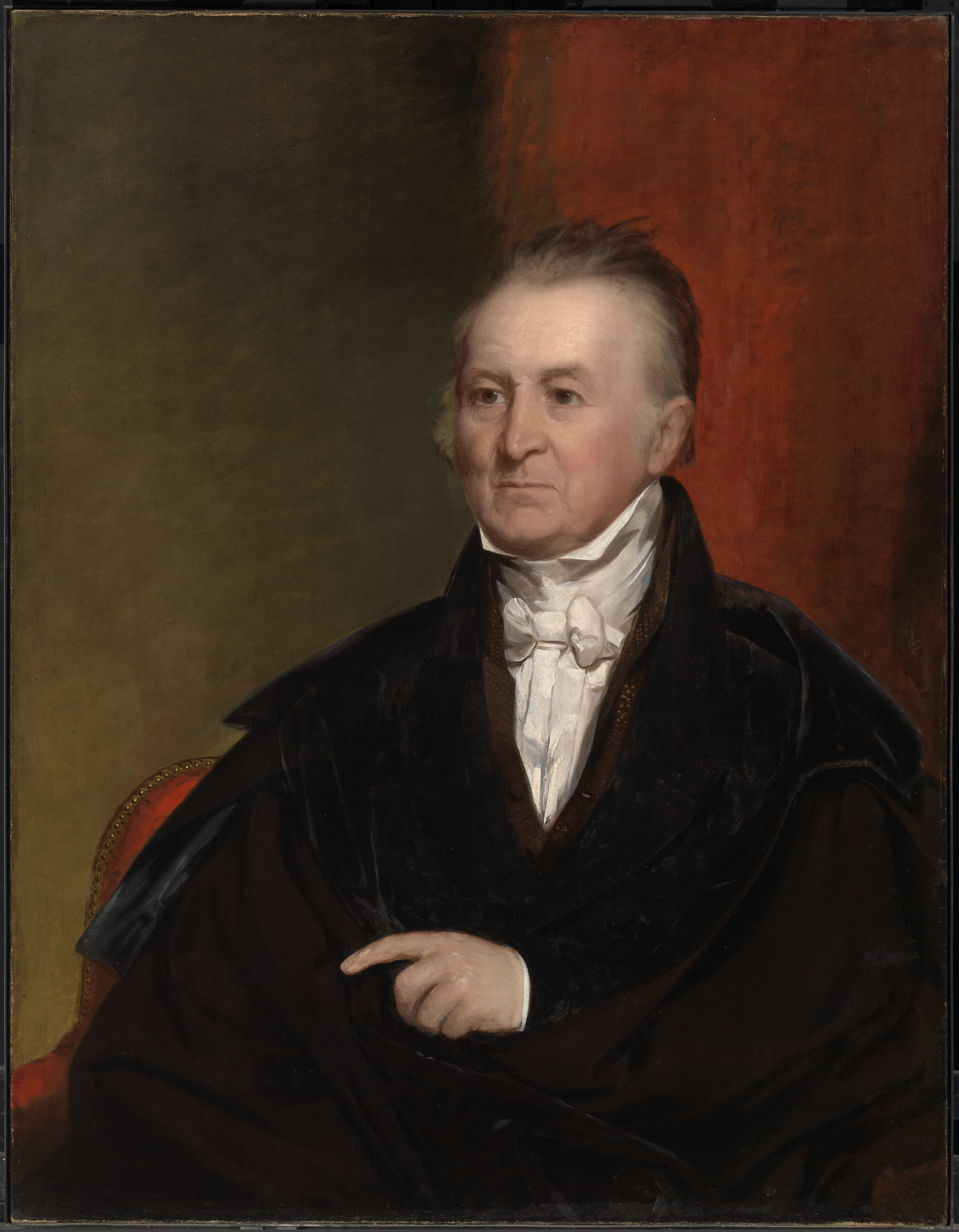
Nominee	William Eustis	Harrison Gray Otis
Party	Democratic-Republican	Federalist
Popular vote	34,402	30,171
Percentage	52.66%	46.18%
- County results Eustis: 50–60% 60–70% Otis: 50–60% 60–70%
Governor before election
John Brooks
Federalist
Elected Governor
William Eustis
Democratic-Republican

The 1823 Massachusetts gubernatorial election was held on April 7.

Federalist Governor John Brooks did not run for a seventh term in office. William Eustis, a Republican, was elected to succeed him over U.S. Senator Harrison Gray Otis. Eustis was the first Republican elected governor since Elbridge Gerry in 1811; no Federalist would ever win a gubernatorial election again, and the state party rapidly collapsed.

== General election ==
=== Candidates ===
- William Eustis, U.S. representative and former U.S. secretary of war (Republican)
- Harrison Gray Otis, former U.S. senator (Federalist)

=== Results ===
1823 Massachusetts gubernatorial election
Party	Candidate	Votes	%	±%
Democratic-Republican	William Eustis	34,402	52.66%	▲10.14
Federalist	Harrison Gray Otis	30,171	46.18%	▼10.97
Write-in		757	1.16%	▲0.79
Total votes		65,340	100.00%	
