= 1819 Massachusetts gubernatorial election =

- April 5, 1819
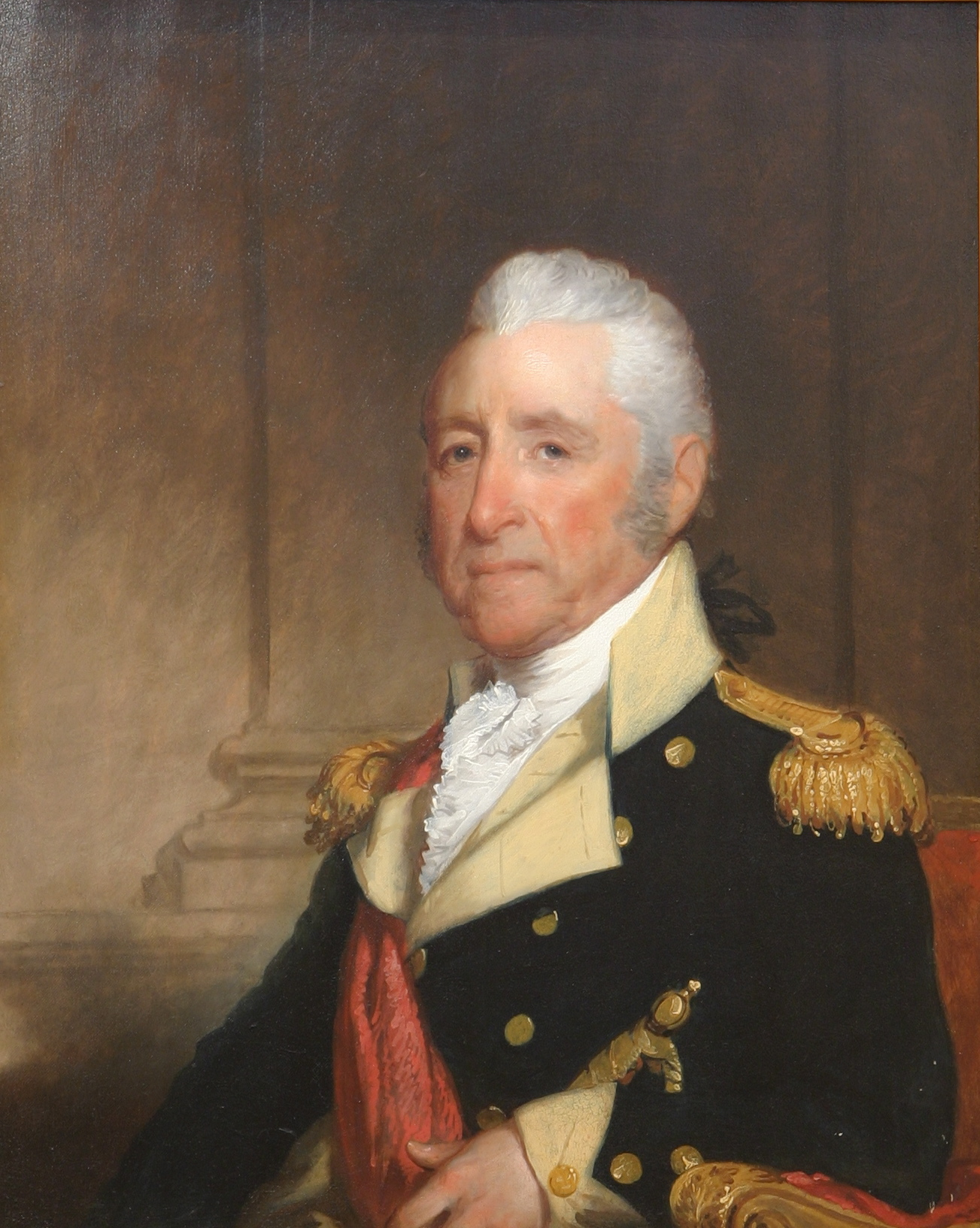

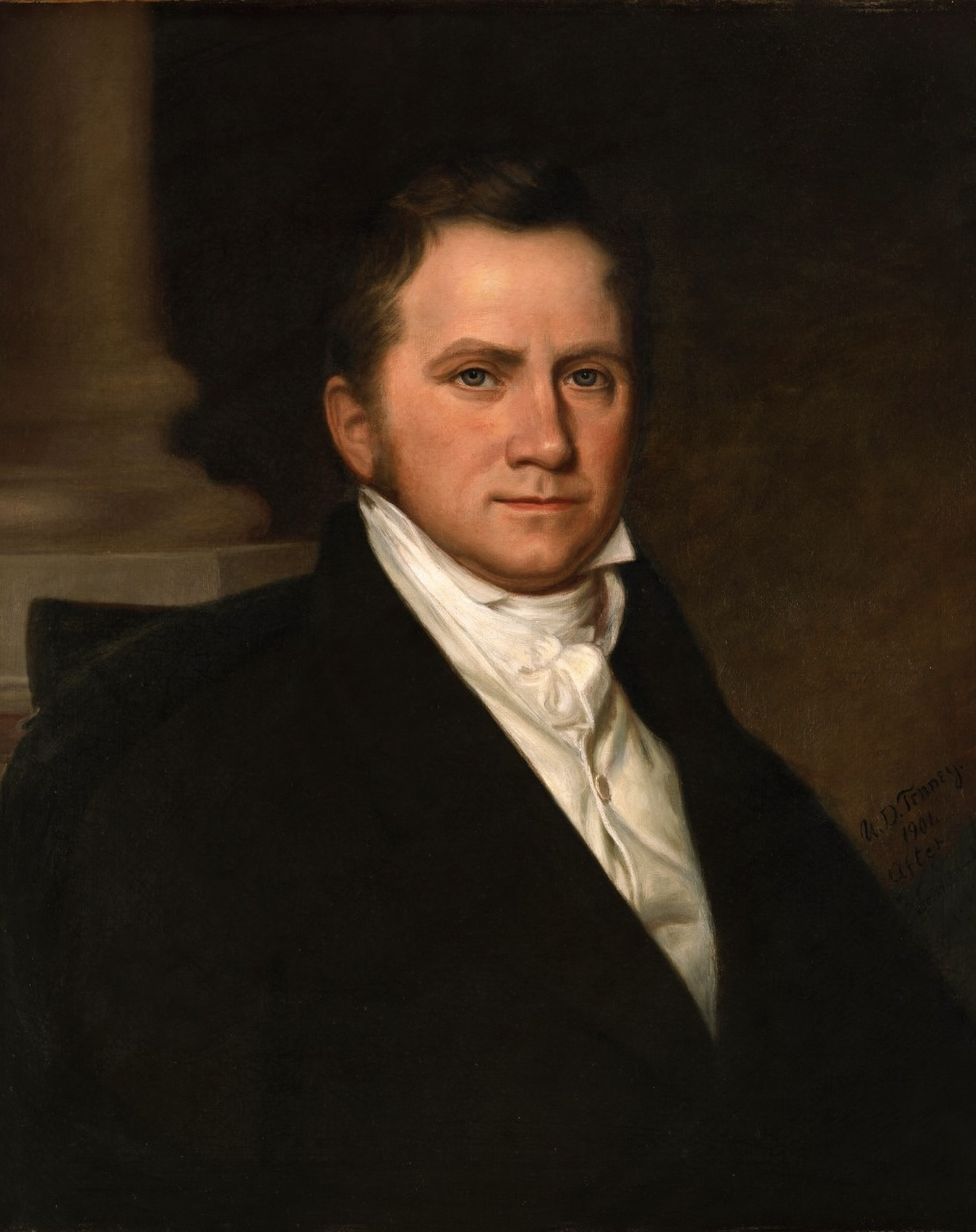
Nominee	John Brooks	Benjamin Williams Crowninshield
Party	Federalist	Democratic-Republican
Popular vote	42,875	35,271
Percentage	53.67%	44.15%
- County results Brooks: 50–60% 60–70% 80–90% Crowninshield: 50–60% 60–70% 70–80%
Governor before election
John Brooks
Federalist
Elected Governor
John Brooks
Federalist

The 1819 Massachusetts gubernatorial election was held on April 5, 1819, in order to elect the Governor of Massachusetts. Incumbent Federalist Governor John Brooks won re-election against Democratic-Republican candidate and former United States Secretary of the Navy Benjamin Williams Crowninshield in a rematch of the previous election.

== General election ==
On election day, April 5, 1819, incumbent Federalist Governor John Brooks won re-election by a margin of 7,604 votes against his opponent Democratic-Republican candidate Benjamin Williams Crowninshield, thereby retaining Federalist control over the office of governor. Brooks was sworn in for his fourth term on May 31, 1819.

=== Results ===
Massachusetts gubernatorial election, 1819
Party	Candidate	Votes	%
Federalist	John Brooks (incumbent)	42,875	53.67%
Democratic-Republican	Benjamin Williams Crowninshield	35,271	44.15%
	Scattering	1,739	2.18%
Total votes		79,885	100.00%
Federalist hold			
