= Salem Street Burying Ground =

Historic cemetery in Massachusetts, United States

- U.S. National Register of Historic Places
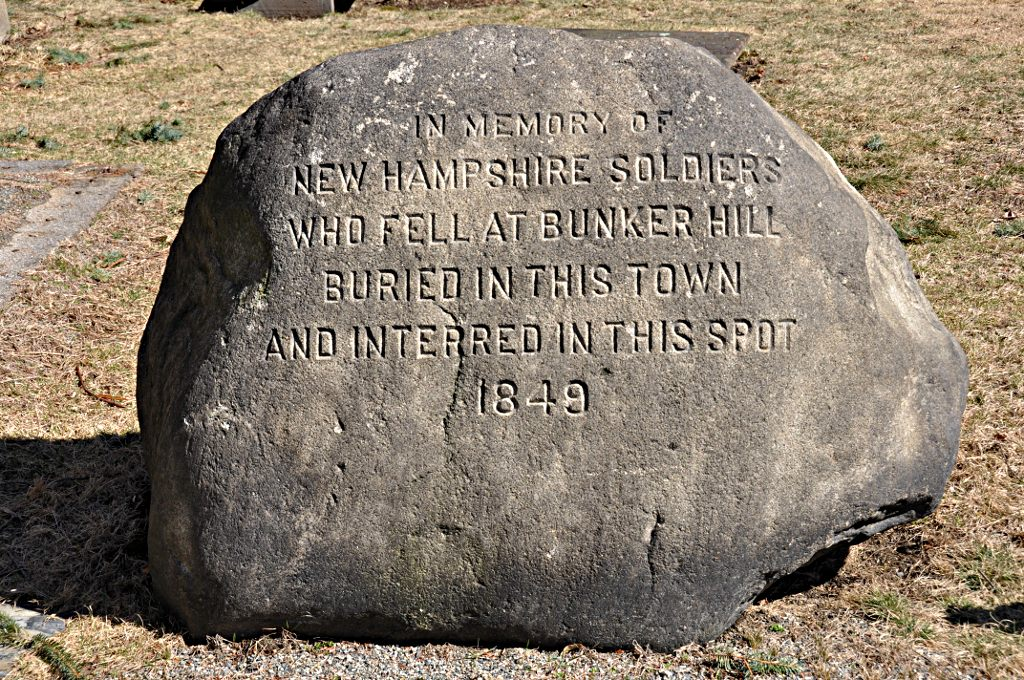
- Marker for New Hampshire's fallen in the Battle of Bunker Hill

- Location within Massachusetts Location within the United States
- Location: Medford Square
- Nearest city: Medford, Massachusetts
- Coordinates: 42°25′5.42″N 71°6′27.41″W
- NRHP reference No.: 81000115
- Added to NRHP: August 27, 1981

Salem Street Burying Ground is a cemetery located at the intersection of Salem Street and Riverside Avenue in Medford, Massachusetts. The Salem Street Burying Ground was used exclusively from the late 17th century to the late 19th century for the burial of the town's wealthy. The cemetery was listed on the National Register of Historic Places in 1981.

The Salem Street Burying Ground was originally the private cemetery of the Wade family. It was acquired by the town of Medford in May 1717. The earliest stone is dated 1683 and the latest 1881. Records indicate that there are six hundred people buried there, but there are only 485 markers. There are several known reasons for this discrepancy.

During the 17th century, one gravestone often marked the burial place of several members of the same family. The final resting place of no less than four members of the Wade family is marked by a single large, brown, slate block; among the largest in the burial ground. Similarly, near the Riverside Avenue entrance of the cemetery, a flagpole and granite stone marker (pictured) commemorate the graves of several unknown Revolutionary war soldiers buried there. The marker's text reads, "In Memory of New Hampshire Soldiers who Fell at Bunker Hill Buried in this Town and Interred at this Spot."

Records also indicated that there are more than fifty enslaved people buried in unmarked graves in the southwest corner of the cemetery.

== History ==
The cemetery and the area surrounding it were settled as a plantation owned by the absent Matthew Craddock, the first governor of the Massachusetts Bay Colony, in 1630. The land was used as a private farm and plantation for forty-five years. From 1660 to 1675, the second owner of the land, Edward Collins, broke the land up into smaller tracts which were sold individually. The purchasers, the Tufts, Bradshaw, Willis, Wade, Brooks, Francis, and Whitmore families became the founders of the town of Medford.

The largest farm in the area was owned by Jonathan Wade. When Wade died in 1689, he left the estate to his son, Dudley. It included "that little pasture called the burying place". By 1717, the Wade family plot had become the town burying ground.

== The graves ==
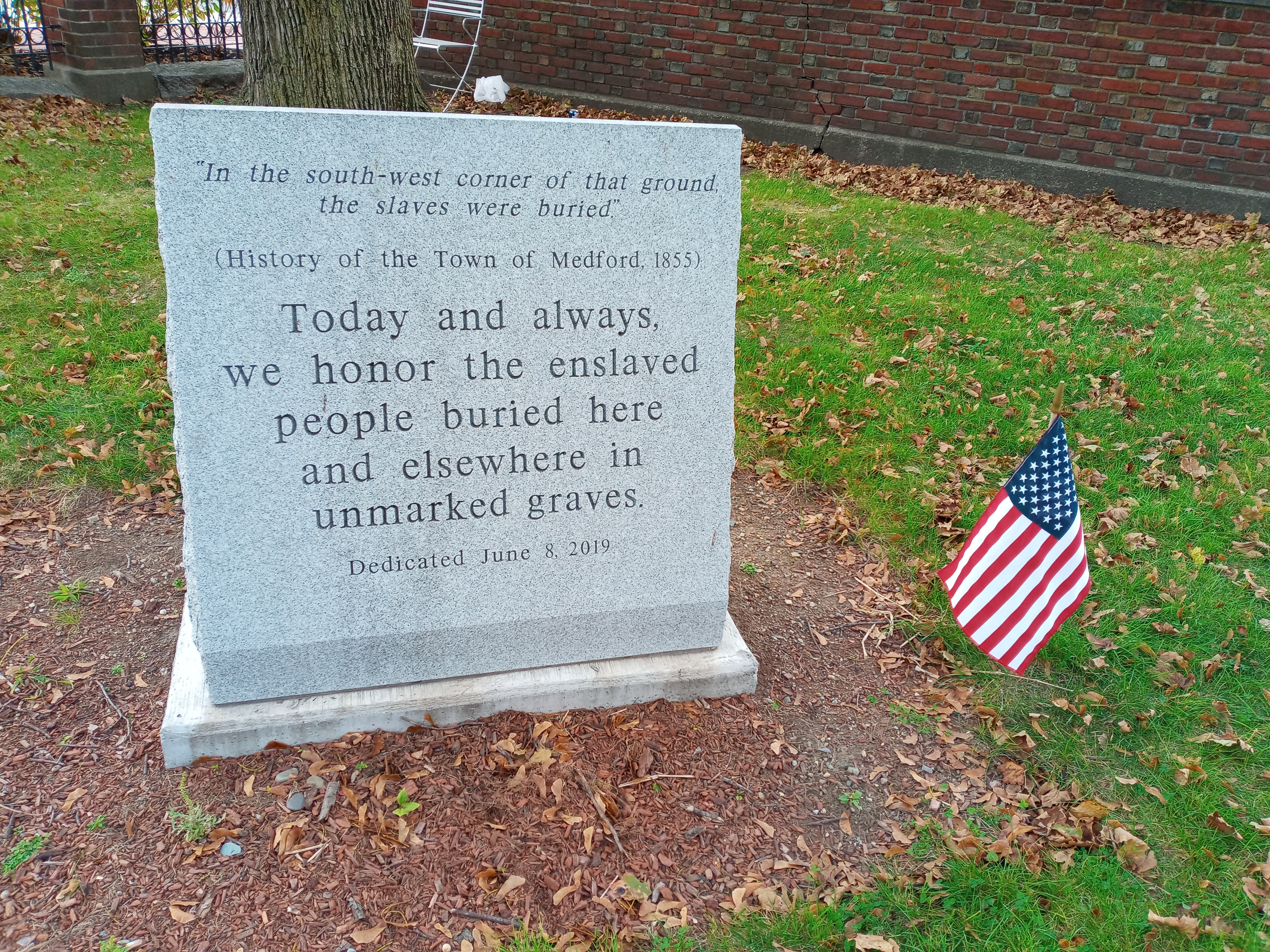
Memorial stone for enslaved people in Medford MA

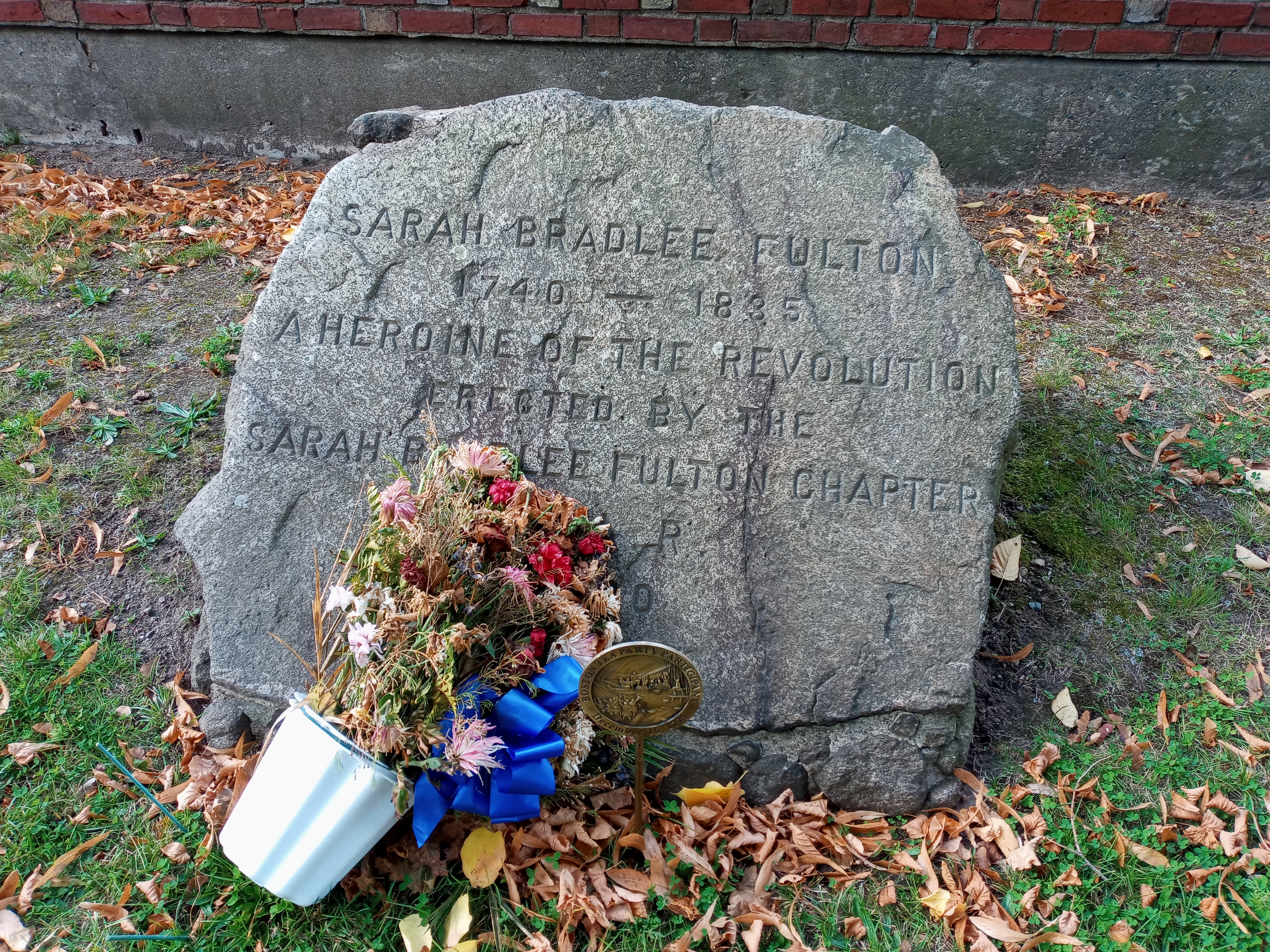
Memorial stone for Sarah Bradlee Fulton, member of the Daughters of Liberty and American Revolutionary War hero.

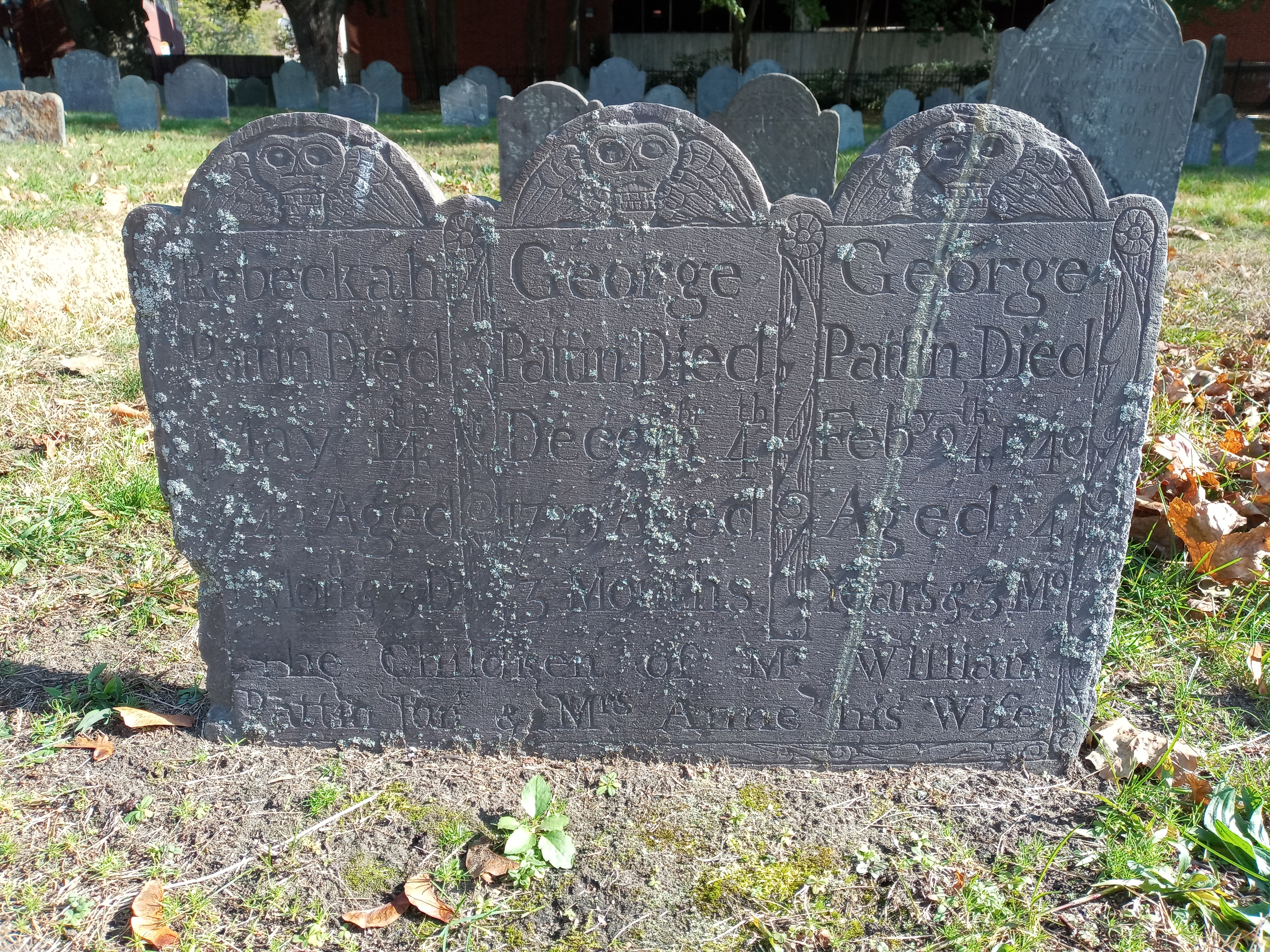
The grave memorial for three children of the Pattin family

Among several notable figures buried there are Massachusetts Governor and Revolutionary War figure John Brooks, whose grave is marked by a large obelisk located in the approximate center of the Burying Ground, and Sarah Bradlee Fulton, a Revolutionary War heroine whose grave is marked by a rock to the left of the Brooks monument.

The details of 35 graves have been documented. Starting from the Burying Ground's northwest corner and working eastward, the graves were selected for documentation in alternating groups of five (five were chosen and their data recorded, the next five were skipped, the following five chosen, and so on). The information collected included first and last names, ages, birth dates (when available), death dates and gravestone iconography. Also included were any pertinent titles (Deacon, Captain, Major, etc.).

Many of the markers fail to provide any specific birth date, noting instead the age of the deceased in years, months, and days. The tombstones of the female dead often omit a first name (for example, "Here lyes buried the wife John Chalcedony, Mrs. Chalcedony").

By far the most prevalent image on the tombstones is the winged skull motif, which represents an ascension into Heaven. Among other symbols engraved on the stones are the willow tree, representing sadness or mourning; the hourglass, representing the passage of time; and bones, representing death or decay.

For the most part the markers are headstones, but there are also three obelisks, two table tombs, one double stone, and three large slabs. There is also a large, tall block of what appears to be granite in the most southerly corner of the cemetery that has no markings of any kind, and it is unclear whether this is a memorial of or just surplus stone. There is no mention of it in any of the records consulted.

Aside from that granite block, most of the markers are made from slate.

In 2019, a memorial for the unnamed enslaved people buried in the cemetery was dedicated.

== See also ==
- National Register of Historic Places listings in Medford, Massachusetts
- National Register of Historic Places listings in Middlesex County, Massachusetts
