= USS Brooks =

Clemson-class destroyer

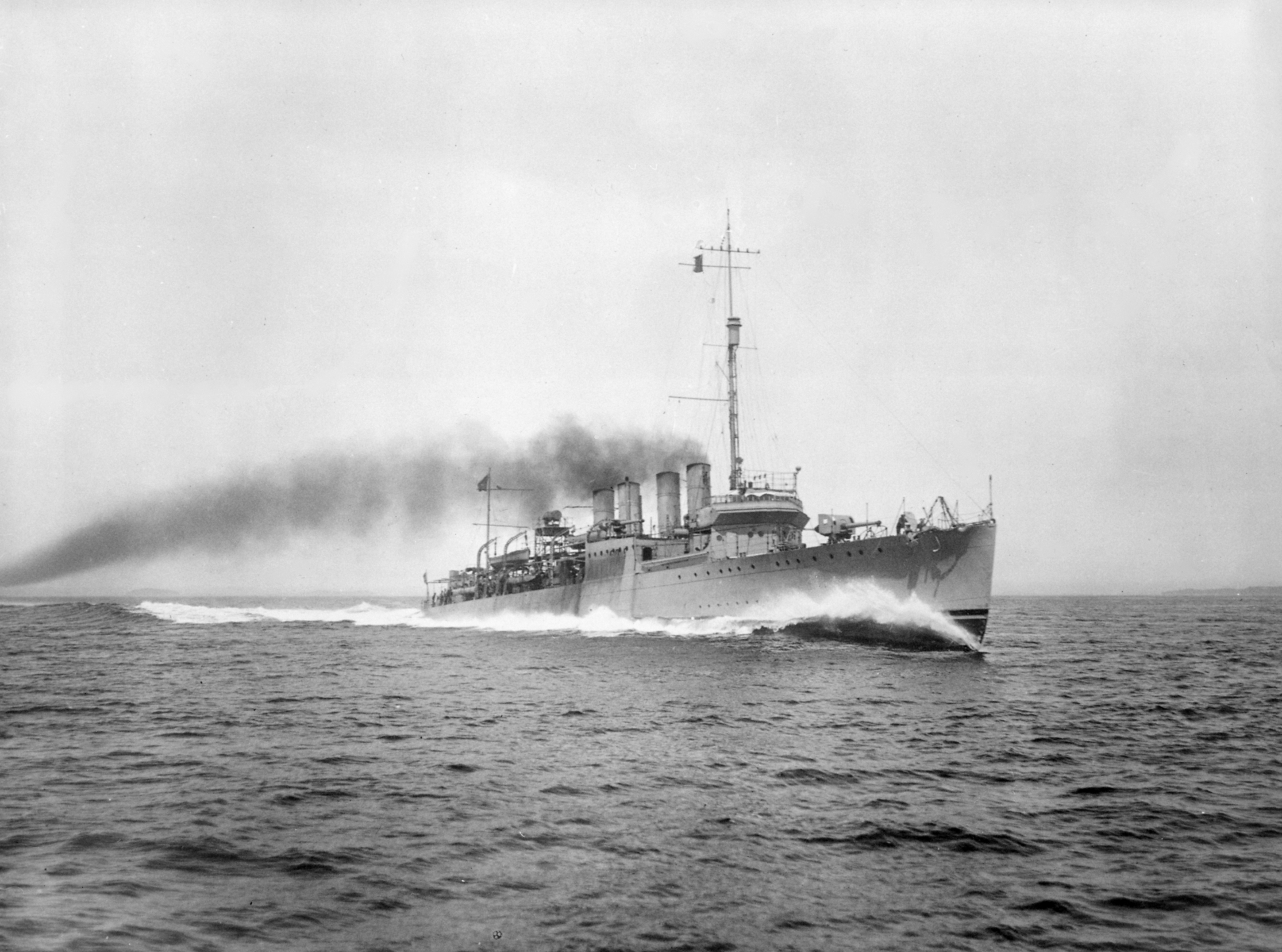
- USS Brooks (DD-232) underway during trials in 1920

History

United States
- Namesake: John Brooks, Jr.
- Builder: New York Shipbuilding
- Cost: $1,096,655.06 (hull & machinery)
- Laid down: 11 June 1918
- Launched: 24 April 1919
- Commissioned: 18 June 1920
- Decommissioned: 20 January 1931
- Recommissioned: 18 June 1932
- Decommissioned: 2 September 1938
- Recommissioned: 25 April 1939
- Reclassified: High-speed transport, APD-10, 1 December 1942
- Decommissioned: 2 August 1945
- Stricken: 17 September 1945
- Fate: Sold for scrap 30 January 1946

General characteristics
- Class & type: Variant of Clemson-class destroyer
- Displacement: 1,215 tons
- Length: 314 feet 4 inches (95.81 m)
- Beam: 31 feet 8 inches (9.65 m)
- Draft: 9 feet 10 inches (3.00 m)
- Propulsion: 26,500 shp (20 MW); geared turbines, 2 screws
- Speed: 33.2 knots (61.5 km/h)
- Range: 4,900 nautical miles (9,100 km); @ 15 kt
- Complement: 130 officers and enlisted
- Armament: 4 x 5 in (130 mm), 1 x 3 in (76 mm), 12 x 21 inch (533 mm) tt.

USS Brooks (DD-232/APD-10) was a Clemson-class United States Navy destroyer who served primarily in Europe and the Atlantic, the Adriatic, and both the Pacific and Caribbean after WWI. Between 1931 and 1939 she was placed out of commission. She was recommissioned in 1939 and served in the Atlantic until 1941, switching to the Pacific Theatre during World War II where she was badly damaged at the Battle of Lingayen Gulf in January 1945. She was named for Lieutenant John Brooks, Jr.

== Construction and commissioning ==
Brooks was launched 24 April 1919 by New York Shipbuilding Company, sponsored by Mrs. George S. Keyes, grandniece of Lieutenant Brooks, and commissioned 18 June 1920.

== Service history ==
Brooks left Philadelphia for European waters 26 August 1920. She was first assigned to the Baltic Patrol for a short time and then the Naval Forces in the Adriatic Sea. She joined the United States Naval Forces in Turkish waters in June 1921. Brooks departed for the United States 26 September 1921 and arrived at New York City 19 October. She was then assigned to the Scouting Fleet, U. S. Fleet, and participated in fleet maneuvers in the Caribbean, Atlantic, and Pacific until placed out of commission in reserve at Philadelphia Navy Yard 20 January 1931.

Brooks was recommissioned at Philadelphia Navy Yard 18 June 1932, and assigned to the Scouting Force, participating in fleet operations on both coasts until going out of commission in reserve at Philadelphia on 2 September 1938. She was recommissioned 25 April 1939 and assigned to the Neutrality Patrol on the Atlantic coast, where she remained until she joined the Local Defense Force, 13th Naval District, in November 1940. Brooks was operating with this force when the United States entered World War II.

=== World War II ===
As a patrol and escort ship, Brooks operated between California, Washington, and Alaska during the first year of World War II. On 20 September 1942, she arrived at Seattle, to commence conversion to a high-speed transport. On 1 December 1942, her classification was changed to APD-10 and she was assigned to the South Pacific.

==== WWII Pacific stations ====
She served as a transport and minesweeper during the Lae, New Guinea, landings (4–14 September 1943); Finschhafen, New Guinea, landings (22 and 29–30 September); Cape Gloucester, New Britain, assault (26 and 28–29 December); Saidor, New Guinea, landings (2 January-17 February 1944); Admiralty Islands landings (29 February-5 March and 19 March); Hollandia, New Guinea, assault (22–28 April); capture of Saipan (14–22 June); Leyte occupation (18 November-4 December); Mindoro invasion (12–18 December); and the Lingayen Gulf landings (3–6 January 1945).

=== Fate ===
At 1252 on 6 January 1945, the worst day for the Navy during the costly Invasion of Lingayen Gulf, a Japanese kamikaze crashed into Brooks' port side, causing extensive damage and starting a fire amidships. The main and auxiliary steam lines were severed, the fire main was broken, and the sea valve to the condenser was pierced, causing the forward engine room to flood. Three of Brooks' crew were killed and 11 wounded. A number of Brooks's abandoned survivors, were rescued by the adjacent HMAS Warramunga (I44) and later transferred to her sister ship the USS Hovey, a minesweeper staged in Minesweeping Unit 1 for the Lingayen invasion, as was Brooks. Five more of Brooks's crew were killed when the US Hovey was sunk by an aerial torpedo at 455 on the following morning of 7 January. The badly damaged Brooks was towed to San Pedro, California, Watch Hill and decommissioned there on 2 August 1945. Brooks was sold 30 January 1946.

== Awards ==
Brooks received the Navy Unit Commendation and six battle stars for her World War II service.

As of 2015, no other U.S. Navy ships have been named Brooks.

== Former crew ==
- Sherman A. Minton, World War II
- Kenneth J. Clark, World War II
- Robert Schmiedeberg 1921

== See also ==
- USS Brooke (FFG-1) for a ship with a similar name.
