= 1820 Massachusetts gubernatorial election =

- April 3, 1820
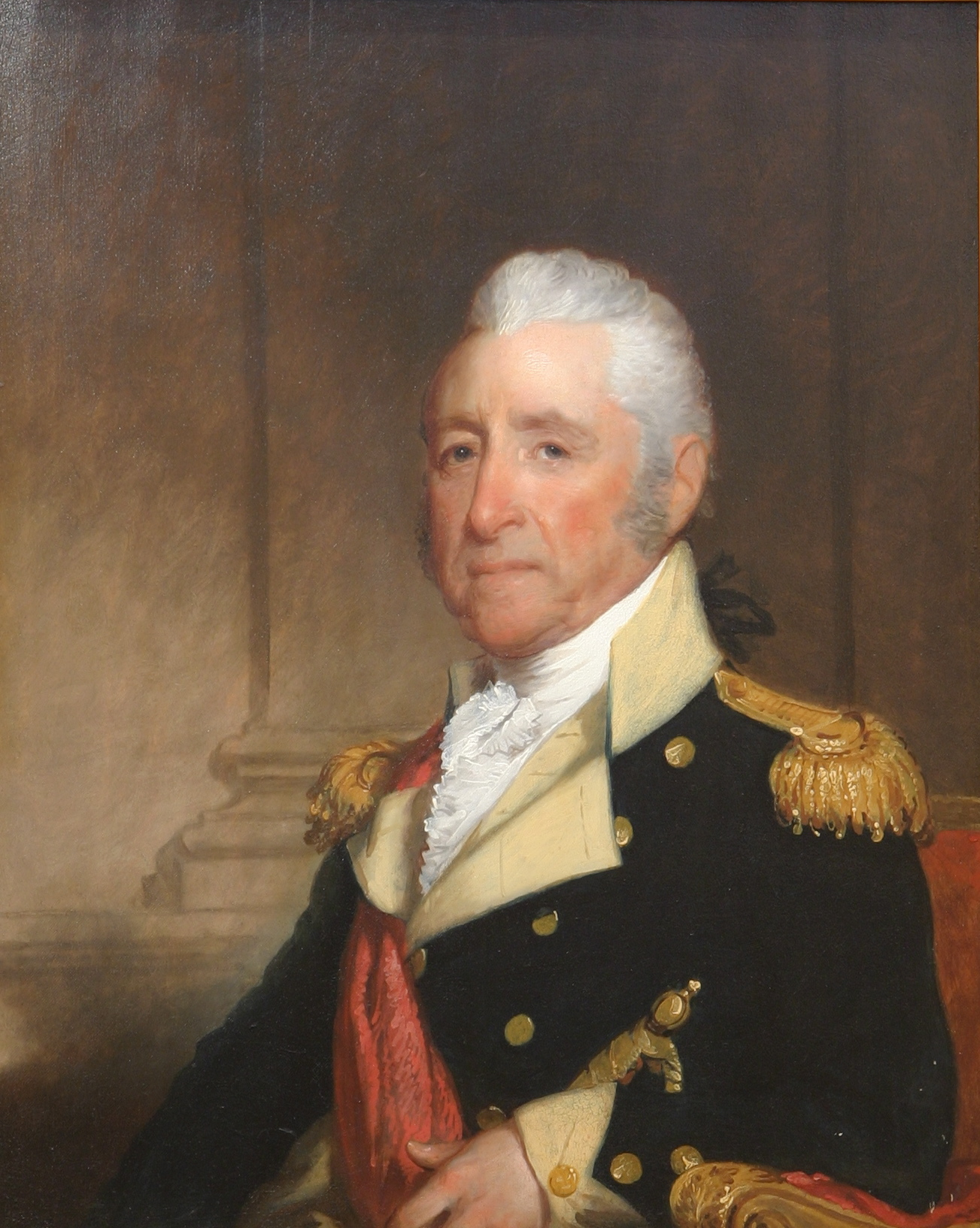

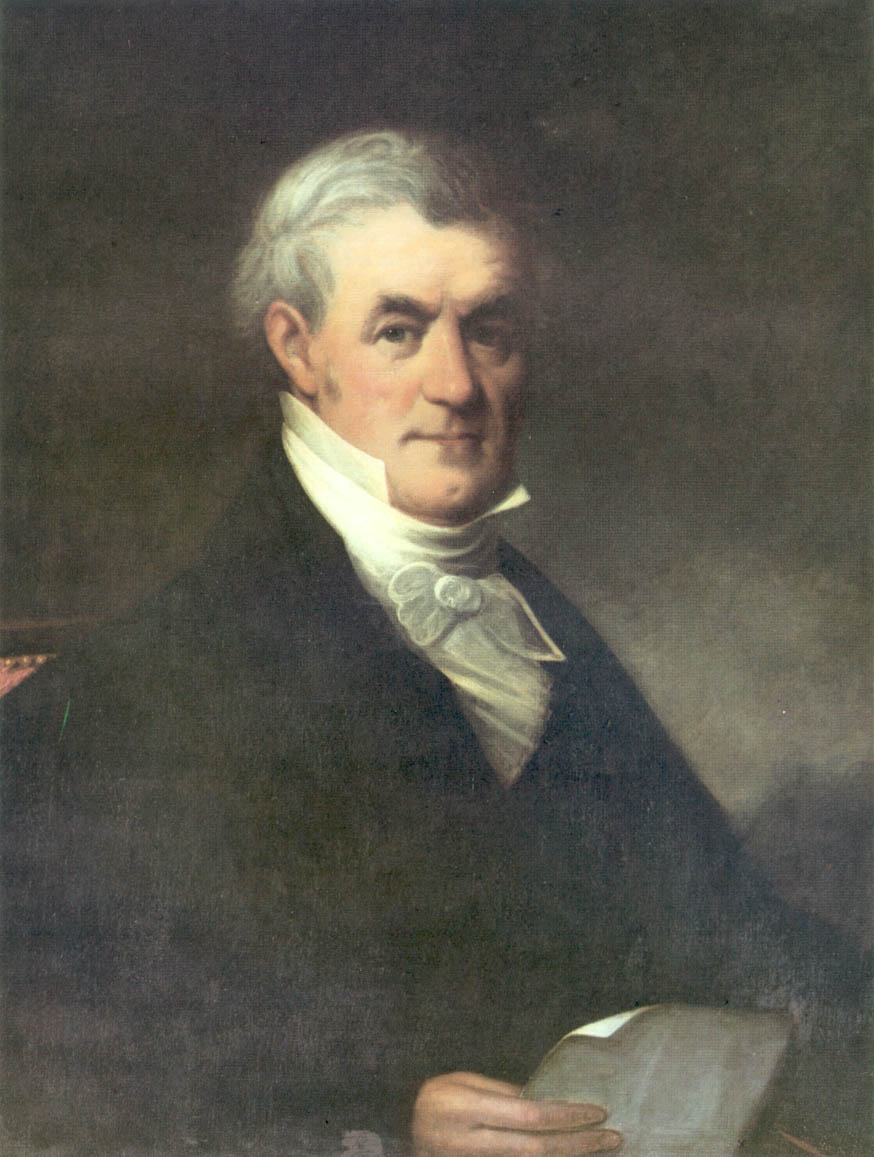
| Nominee | John Brooks | William Eustis |
| Party | Federalist | Democratic-Republican |
| Popular vote | 31,072 | 21,927 |
| Percentage | 58.30% | 41.14% |
- County results Brooks: 50–60% 60–70% 70–80% 80–90% Eustis: 50–60% 60–70%
Governor before election
John Brooks
Federalist
Elected Governor
John Brooks
Federalist

The 1820 Massachusetts gubernatorial election was held on April 3, 1820.

Incumbent Federalist Governor John Brooks won re-election to a fifth term, defeating Democratic-Republican nominee William Eustis.

== General election ==
=== Candidates ===
- John Brooks, Federalist, incumbent governor
- William Eustis, Democratic-Republican, incumbent U.S. representative, former secretary of war

=== Results ===
1820 Massachusetts gubernatorial election
| Party | Candidate | Votes | % | ±% |
|---|---|---|---|---|
| Federalist | John Brooks (incumbent) | 31,072 | 58.30% | |
| Democratic-Republican | William Eustis | 21,927 | 41.14% | |
| Scattering | | 298 | 0.56% | |
| Majority | | 9,145 | 17.16% | |
| Turnout | | 53,297 | | |
| Federalist hold | | Swing | | |
