= John Brooks Jr. =

John Brooks (c. 1783 – September 10, 1813) was an officer in the United States Marine Corps during the War of 1812. He was the son of later Governor of Massachusetts John Brooks.

== Biography ==
Born in Brookfield, Massachusetts, Brooks was appointed a 2nd Lieutenant, October 1, 1807. He commanded the detachment of Marines on Commodore Oliver Hazard Perry's flagship, USS Lawrence.

He was killed in action during the Battle of Lake Erie on September 10, 1813.

Concurrent with the issuance of Congressional Gold Medals to Commodore Perry and Jesse Elliott, Congress awarded Silver Medals (modeled on the Perry medal) to each commissioned officer and one to the nearest male relative of Lt. John Brooks Jr. of the U.S. Marine Corps, who was killed in the engagement.

The destroyer USS Brooks, launched in 1919, was named for him.
