= 1822 Massachusetts gubernatorial election =

- April 1, 1822
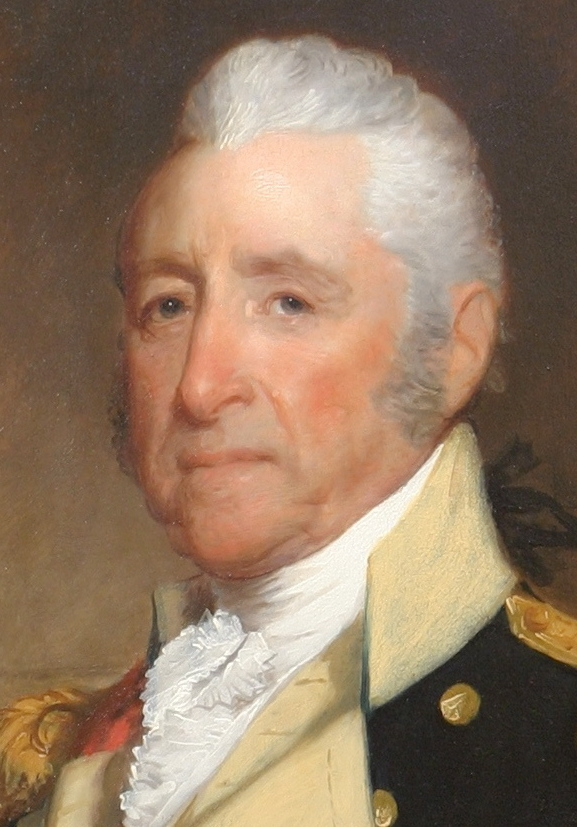

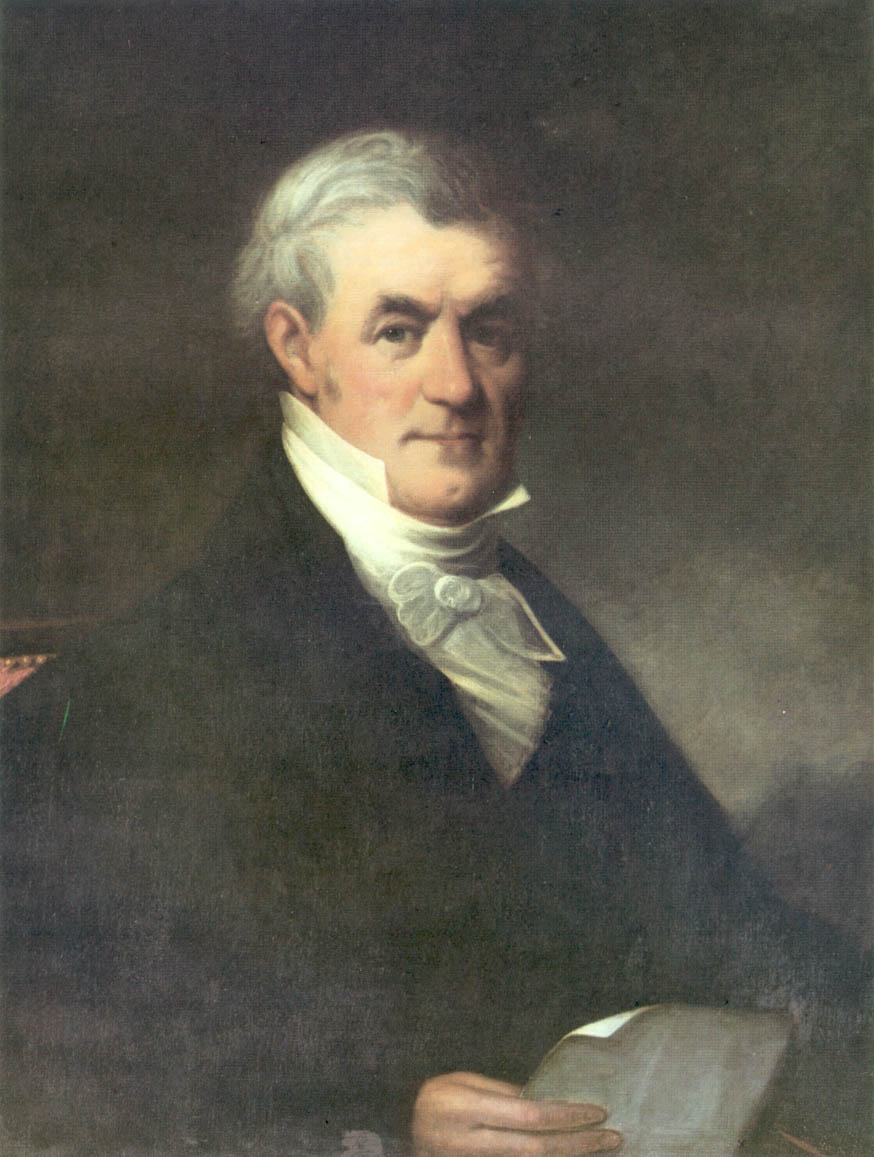
Nominee	John Brooks	William Eustis
Party	Federalist	Democratic-Republican
Popular vote	28,751	21,410
Percentage	57.11%	42.53%
- County results Brooks: 50–60% 60–70% 70–80% 80–90% Eustis: 50–60% 60–70%
Governor before election
John Brooks
Federalist
Elected Governor
John Brooks
Federalist

The 1822 Massachusetts gubernatorial election was held on April 1.

Federalist Governor John Brooks was re-elected to a seventh term in office over Republican William Eustis.

== General election ==
=== Candidates ===
- John Brooks, incumbent governor since 1816 (Federalist)
- William Eustis, U.S. representative and former U.S. secretary of war (Republican)

=== Results ===
1822 Massachusetts gubernatorial election (Note: There is disagreement among the sources for the exact totals. The listed totals are those provided by Tufts University.)
Party	Candidate	Votes	%	±%
Federalist	John Brooks (incumbent)	28,751	57.11%	▼1.13
Democratic-Republican	William Eustis	21,410	42.53%	▲1.19
Write-in		185	0.37%	▼0.06
Total votes		49,849	100.00%	
