= 1818 Massachusetts gubernatorial election =

- April 6, 1818
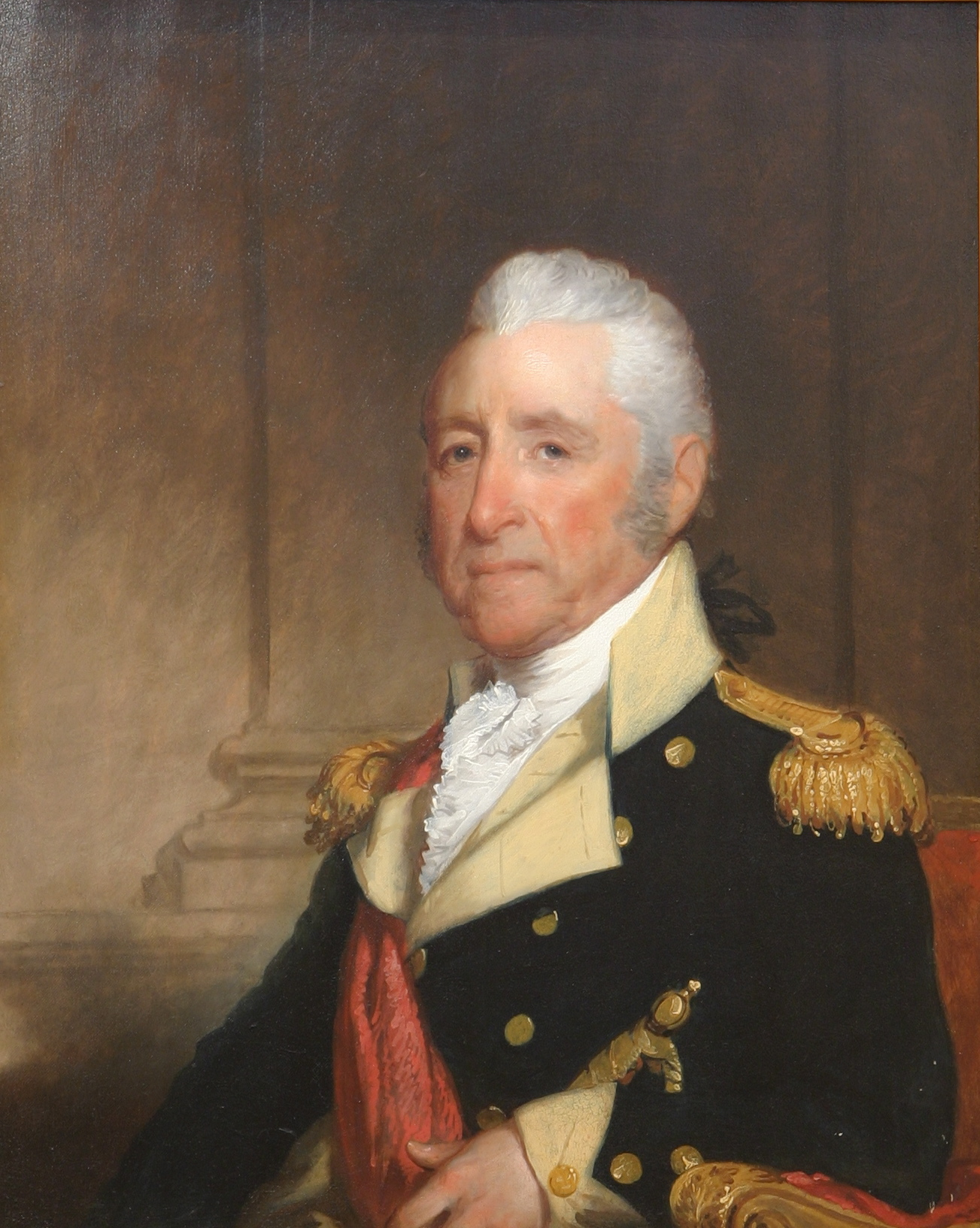

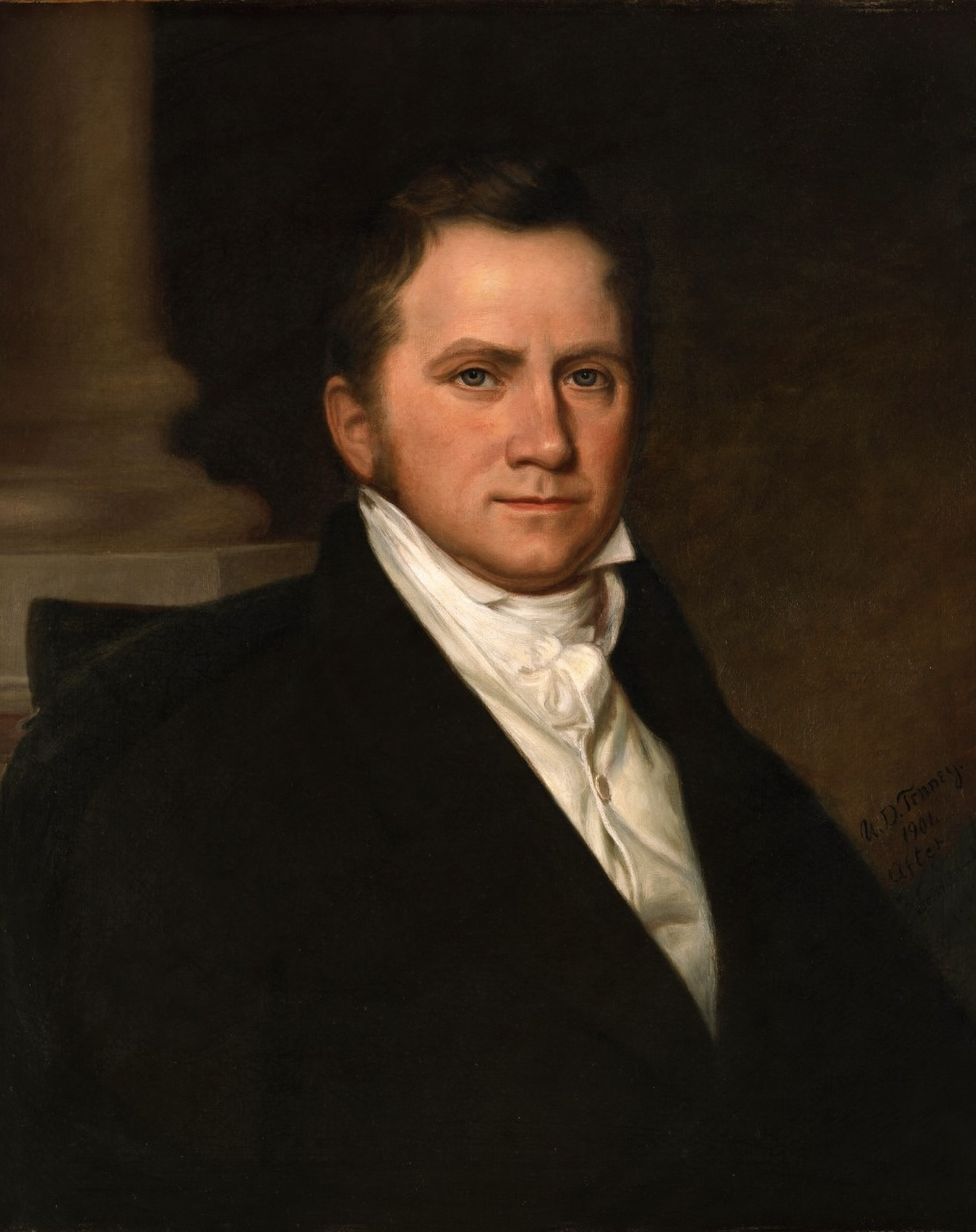
| Nominee | John Brooks | Benjamin Williams Crowninshield |
| Party | Federalist | Democratic-Republican |
| Popular vote | 39,538 | 30,041 |
| Percentage | 55.75% | 42.35% |
- County results Brooks: 50–60% 60–70% 70–80% 80–90% Crowninshield: 50–60% 60–70%
Governor before election
John Brooks
Federalist
Elected Governor
John Brooks
Federalist

The 1818 Massachusetts gubernatorial election was held on April 6, 1818, in order to elect the Governor of Massachusetts. Incumbent Federalist Governor John Brooks won re-election against Democratic-Republican candidate and incumbent United States Secretary of the Navy Benjamin Williams Crowninshield.

== General election ==
On election day, April 6, 1818, incumbent Federalist Governor John Brooks won re-election by a margin of 9,497 votes against his opponent Democratic-Republican candidate Benjamin Williams Crowninshield, thereby retaining Federalist control over the office of governor. Brooks was sworn in for his third term on May 31, 1818.

=== Results ===
Massachusetts gubernatorial election, 1818
| Party | Candidate | Votes | % |
|---|---|---|---|
| Federalist | John Brooks (incumbent) | 39,538 | 55.75% |
| Democratic-Republican | Benjamin Williams Crowninshield | 30,041 | 42.35% |
| | Scattering | 1,348 | 1.90% |
| Total votes | | 70,927 | 100.00% |
| Federalist hold | | | |
