= 1819 Connecticut lieutenant gubernatorial election =

- April 9, 1819
Nominee	Jonathan Ingersoll
Party	Toleration
Popular vote	20,051
Percentage	93.90%
Lieutenant Governor before election
Jonathan Ingersoll
Toleration
Elected Lieutenant Governor
Jonathan Ingersoll
Toleration

The 1819 Connecticut lieutenant gubernatorial election was held on April 9, 1819, in order to elect the lieutenant governor of Connecticut. Incumbent Toleration lieutenant governor Jonathan Ingersoll won re-election as he ran virtually unopposed.

== General election ==
On election day, April 9, 1819, incumbent Toleration lieutenant governor Jonathan Ingersoll won re-election with 93.90% of the vote, thereby retaining Toleration control over the office of lieutenant governor. Ingersoll was sworn in for his fourth term on May 13, 1819.

=== Results ===
Connecticut lieutenant gubernatorial election, 1819
Party	Candidate	Votes	%
Toleration	Jonathan Ingersoll (incumbent)	20,051	93.90
	Scattering	1,309	6.10
Total votes		21,360	100.00
Toleration hold			
