= 1819 Virginia gubernatorial election =

- December 10, 1819
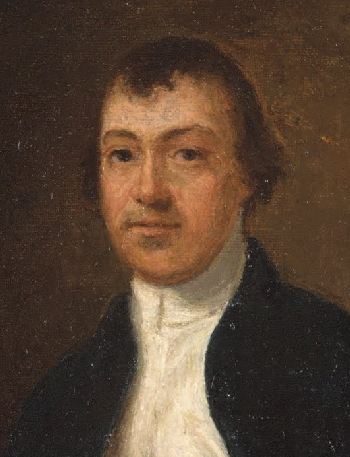

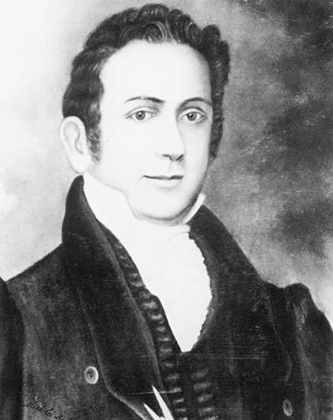
Nominee	Thomas Mann Randolph Jr.	Burwell Bassett	Linn Banks
1st ballot	112	46	32
Governor before election
James Patton Preston
Democratic-Republican
Elected Governor
Thomas Mann Randolph Jr.
Democratic-Republican (Note: Lampi lists no parties for this election. Kallenbach and Kallenbach list Randolph as a Jeffersonian Republican, while Sobel and Raimo do not indicate a party.)

A gubernatorial election was held in Virginia on December 10, 1819. The member of the Virginia House of Delegates from Albemarle County Thomas Mann Randolph Jr. defeated the member from James City County Burwell Bassett and the speaker of the Virginia House of Delegates Linn Banks.

The incumbent governor of Virginia James Patton Preston was ineligible for re-election due to term limits established by the Constitution of Virginia. The election was conducted by the Virginia General Assembly in joint session. Randolph was elected with a majority on the first ballot.

== General election ==
1819 Virginia gubernatorial special election
Candidate	First ballot	
Candidate	Count	Percent
Thomas Mann Randolph Jr.	112	58.95
Burwell Bassett	46	24.21
Linn Banks	32	16.84
Total	190	100.00

== Bibliography ==
- Kallenbach, Joseph E.; Kallenbach, Jessamine S. (1977). American State Governors, 1776–1976. Vol. 1. Dobbs Ferry, NY: Oceana Publications.
- Lampi, Philip J. (2012). "Virginia 1819 Governor". A New Nation Votes. American Antiquarian Society.
- Sobel, Robert; Raimo, John (1978). Biographical Directory of the Governors of the United States 1789–1978. Vol. 4. Westport, CT: Meckler Books.
