= John Brooks (Massachusetts politician) =

American general and governor

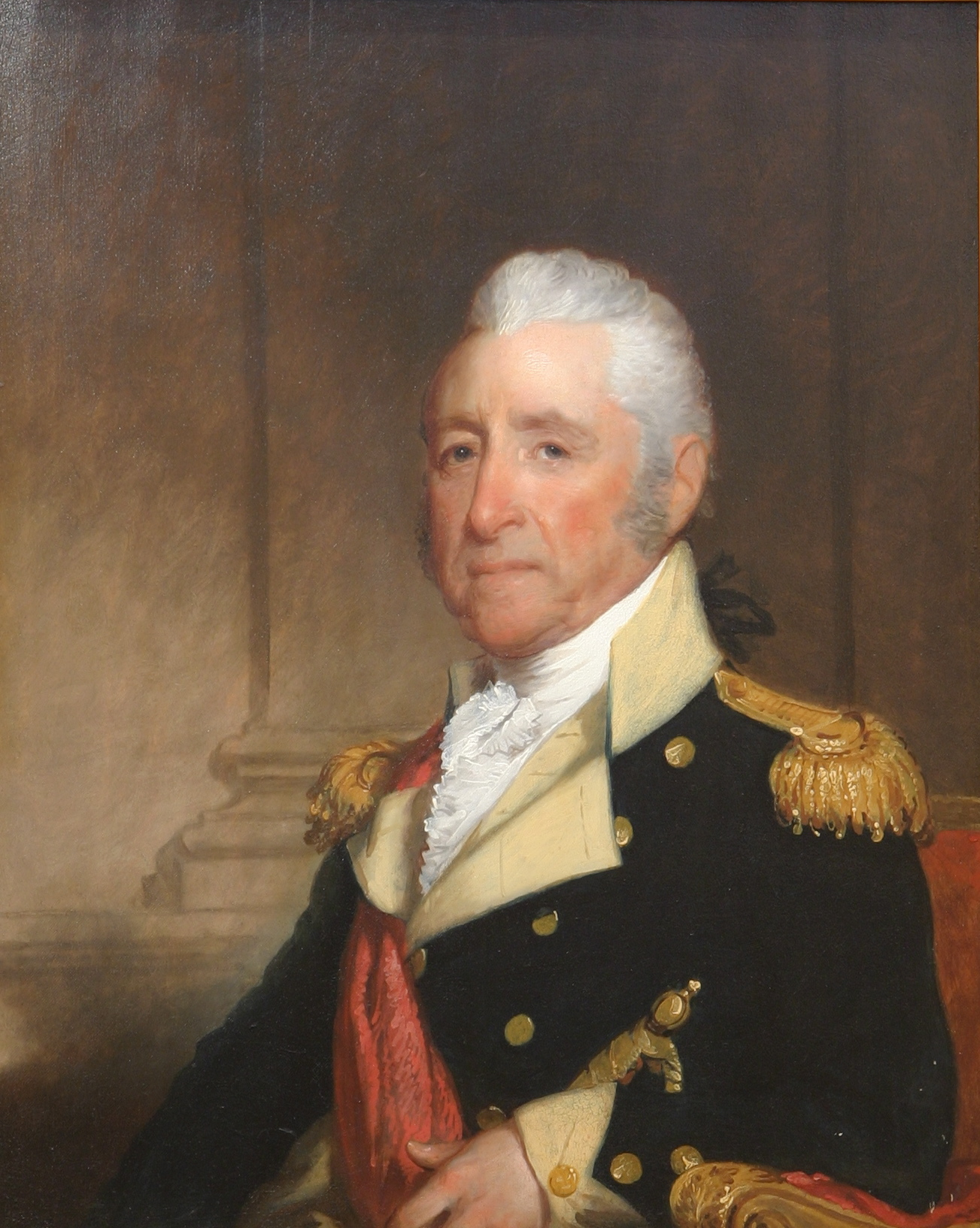
- Portrait c. 1820

11th Governor of Massachusetts
- In office May 30, 1816 – May 31, 1823
- Lieutenant: William Phillips, Jr.
- Preceded by: Caleb Strong
- Succeeded by: William Eustis

Personal details
- Born: baptized May 4, 1752 Medford, Province of Massachusetts Bay, British America
- Died: March 1, 1825 (aged 72) Medford, Massachusetts, U.S.
- Resting place: Salem Street Burying Ground
- Party: Federalist
- Spouse: Lucy Smith
- Children: 3

Military service
- Branch/service: Continental Army; Massachusetts militia
- Battles/wars: American Revolutionary War: Battles of Lexington and Concord; Battle of Meriam's Corner; Siege of Boston; Battle of White Plains; Siege of Fort Stanwix (relief); Battles of Saratoga; Battle of Monmouth; Shays' Rebellion War of 1812

John Brooks (baptized May 4, 1752 – March 1, 1825) was an American medical doctor, military officer, and politician from Massachusetts. He served as the 11th governor of Massachusetts from 1816 to 1823, and was one of the last Federalist officials elected in the United States.

Trained as a doctor, Brooks was an officer of the Reading, Massachusetts militia when the American Revolutionary War broke out, and led his troops in the Battles of Lexington and Concord. He served under George Washington in the New York and New Jersey campaign of 1776, although he missed the Battle of Trenton due to illness. In 1777 he was part of the relief force for the Siege of Fort Stanwix, and led a successful assault against British positions in the key Second Battle of Saratoga. He played a significant role in the 1783 Newburgh Conspiracy, in which he helped quash ideas of mutiny in the Continental Army.

After the war he returned to medical practice, but continued to be active in the state militia, helping to put down Shays' Rebellion in 1787. He served in the militia during the War of 1812, after which he was elected governor. Brooks was popular and politically moderate, and came to personify the "Era of Good Feelings" that followed the war. He retired in 1823, and died two years later.

== Early years ==
John Brooks was born in Medford, the son of Caleb and Ruth Albree Brooks, who were local farmers, and was baptized on May 4, 1752. After education in the local schools, Brooks studied medicine with Dr. Simon Tufts alongside Benjamin Thompson. In his free time he engaged in military drills with other local boys and carefully watched the maneuvers of British Army troops stationed in nearby Boston. When his apprenticeship with Dr. Tufts ended Brooks established a medical practice in Reading, where he was active in the local militia.

== Revolutionary War service ==
When Paul Revere gave the alarm that sparked the Battles of Lexington and Concord on April 19, 1775, Brooks, then 22 and a major in the Reading militia, marched with his unit in response. His troops were among the first to reach Concord as the British took the road back to Boston, and are credited with beginning the running battle that took place. Brooks led his company during the Battle of Meriam's Corner. Brooks later described that day as the most difficult of his life. He then joined the Continental Army in May 1775 as a major in Bridge's Regiment, and was among the troops sent to fortify Breed's Hill on the night of June 16–17. He missed the next day's Battle of Bunker Hill, because he was sent by Colonel William Prescott to request reinforcements. He continued to serve in the Siege of Boston, transferring to the 19th Continental Regiment on January 1, 1776. One of Brooks' subordinates in this unit was William Hull, with whom he formed a fast friendship. After the British withdrawal from Boston, Brooks' regiment next saw action in the October 1776 Battle of White Plains, and was in General George Washington's retreat across New Jersey afterward. Brooks was ill in camp when the army engaged in the Battle of Trenton on December 26. On November 1, 1776 he transferred to the 8th Massachusetts Regiment, where he was promoted to lieutenant colonel.

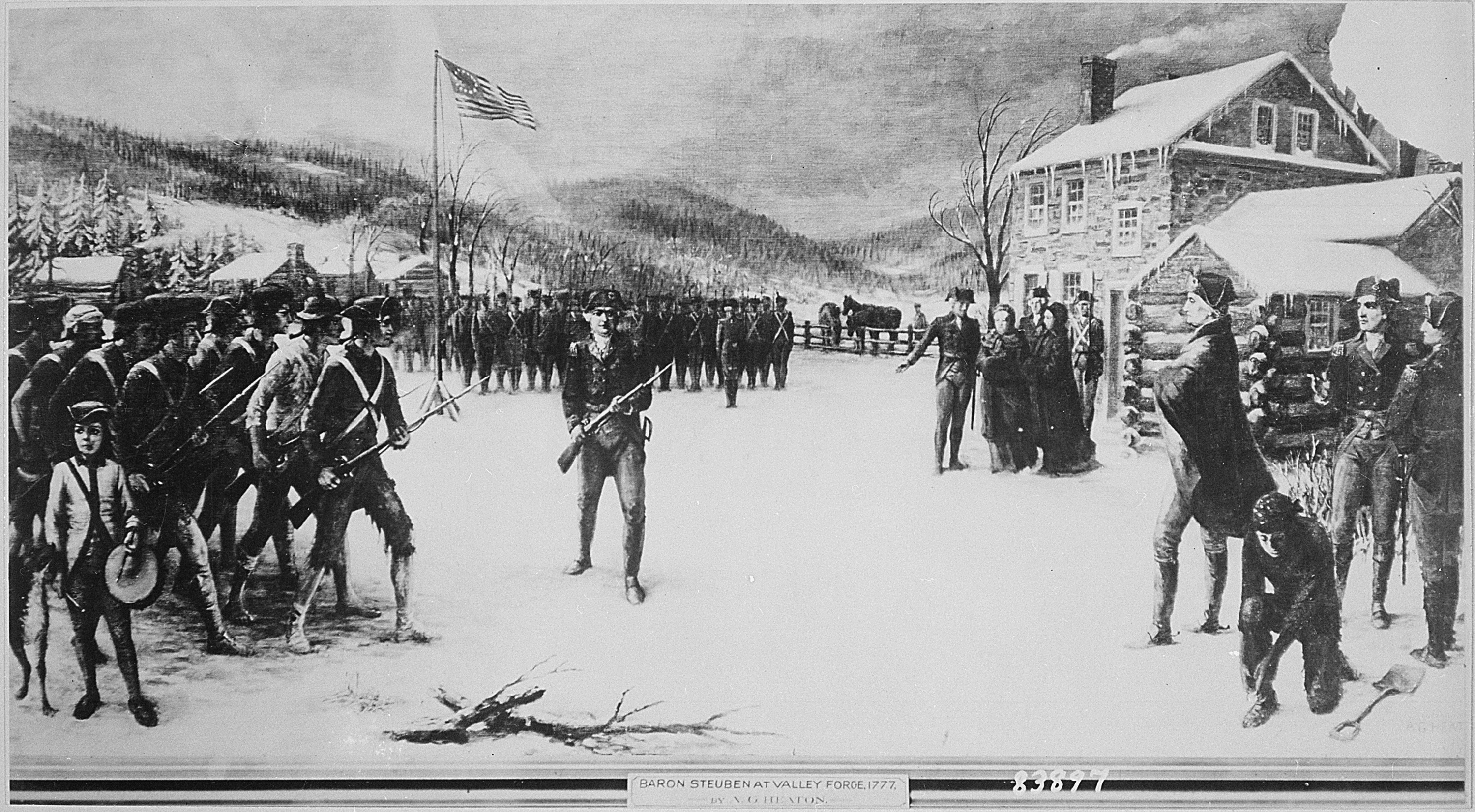
Von Steuben drilling troops at Valley Forge

The 8th Massachusetts was among the forces Benedict Arnold led in relief of the Siege of Fort Stanwix in upstate New York, and was present at the Battles of Saratoga. In the second battle on October 7, 1777, Brooks gained a reputation for fearlessness in the assault and capture of Hessian fortifications on the British right. In the winter of 1777–78 Brooks was at Valley Forge, where he served as a leading drill master under Baron von Steuben. In a letter to a friend Brooks describes the harsh conditions of the camp at Valley Forge, as he mentions the “poor brave fellows” that were living in tents “bare-footed, bare-legged, bare-breeched”.

Brooks was temporarily named adjutant to General Charles Lee when the army followed the British across New Jersey in 1778, engaging them in the Battle of Monmouth. He was transferred to the 7th Massachusetts in November 1778, and was its lieutenant-colonel commandant until June 12, 1783 when he resigned. His regiment was involved in garrison duty in New England and the New York City area until the end of his service.

Brooks was a Freemason and in 1781 was elected master of Washington Lodge under the Grand Lodge of Massachusetts. Washington Lodge was a "Travelling Lodge" which travelled with the Continental Army.

In 1783 Brooks played a prominent role in events concerning army pay arrears and pensions that became known as the Newburgh Conspiracy. He was one of three officers who delivered to the Continental Congress a letter drafted by discontented officers, and participated in hearings in which the army delegation outlined serious issues among the officers at Newburgh, New York. He then carried letters back to the army headquarters, and took part in actions orchestrated by Washington supporters to put down any ideas of mutiny. He was accused, apparently falsely, of informing Washington of the conspiracy (Washington was tipped off by Alexander Hamilton to anticipate unrest.) Historian Richard Kohn writes that details are lacking of Brooks' actions and motivations in the critical days of the conspiracy in February and March 1783, but describes his role in the affair as "crucial".

In 1783 Brooks was admitted as an original member of The Society of the Cincinnati in the state of Massachusetts and served as that constituent society's first secretary from 1783 to 1786. In 1810 he was elected president of the Massachusetts Society and in 1811 he was elected vice president of the national society. He served both offices until his death in 1825.

== Post-Revolution and War of 1812 ==
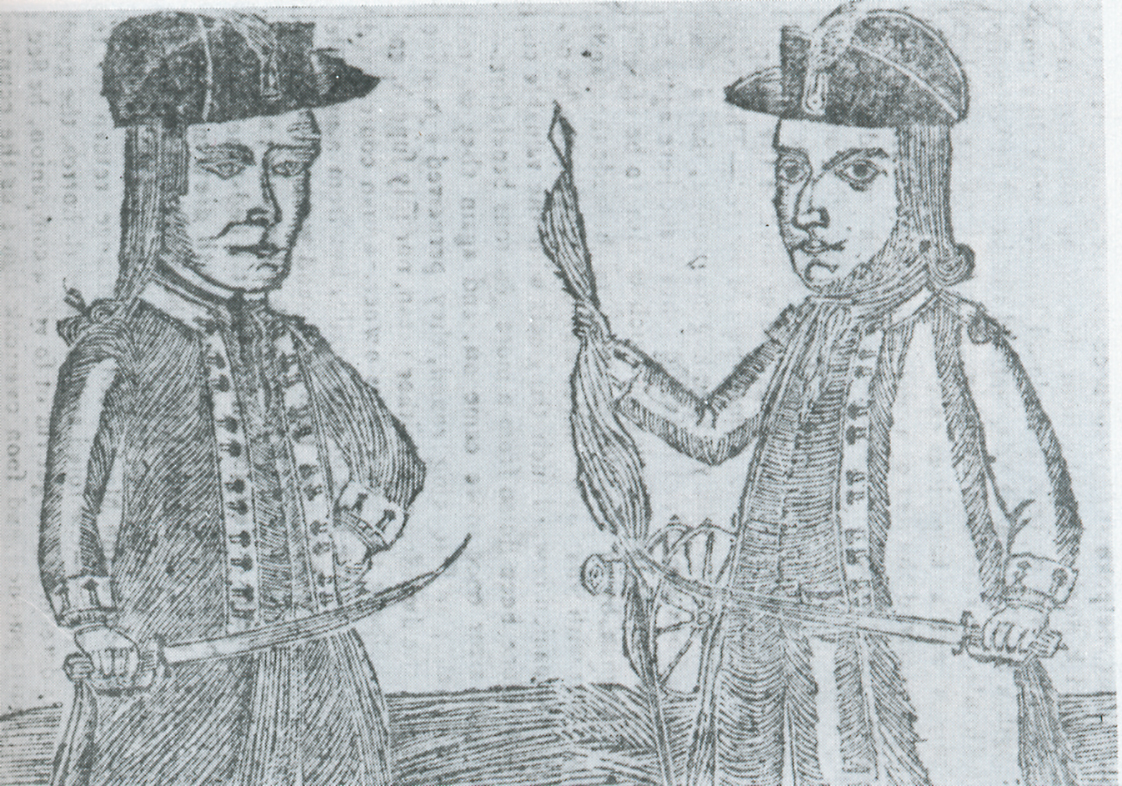
Contemporary unflattering depiction of the leaders of Shays' Rebellion

After the war Brooks returned to medical practice, taking over the office of Dr. Tufts in Medford. He was the first member elected to the Ancient and Honorable Artillery Company when it was revived after the Revolution in 1786.

In the militia he rose to the position of major general in command of the Middlesex Division. He commanded the division under Major General Benjamin Lincoln when the Massachusetts Militia put down Shays' Rebellion in 1787. That same year, he was elected to a one-year term as captain of the Ancient and Honorable Artillery Company. He was elected to the state convention that ratified the United States Constitution in 1788, and also unsuccessfully ran for the United States House of Representatives that year.

From 1791 to 1796, Brooks was the United States Marshal for the District of Massachusetts. In 1792, Secretary at War Henry Knox offered him a position as brigadier general in the Legion of the United States, a reorganization of the United States Army headed by General Anthony Wayne. Brooks refused the appointment, which went instead to his friend William Hull. He was elected to a second one-year term as captain of the Ancient and Honorable Artillery Company in 1794. Brooks was offered a position as brigadier general in the United States Army by George Washington when war was threatened with France in 1797, but refused. During the War of 1812 Brooks was the state militia's adjutant general with the rank of major general.

== Governor of Massachusetts ==
Brooks, politically a Federalist, served in the state legislature for a number of years. In 1816 Governor Caleb Strong announced his retirement. The Federalist caucus first chose Harrison Gray Otis as its candidate, but he categorically refused the nomination. The nomination was next offered to Lieutenant Governor William Phillips, Jr., but he also turned the nomination down because he was not the first choice. The caucus then cast about for other candidates; Brooks was proposed by House Speaker Timothy Bigelow. He also initially refused the nomination, but was convinced by a committee from the caucus to accept, and won the election. He won reelection annually until 1823, when he retired from public service.

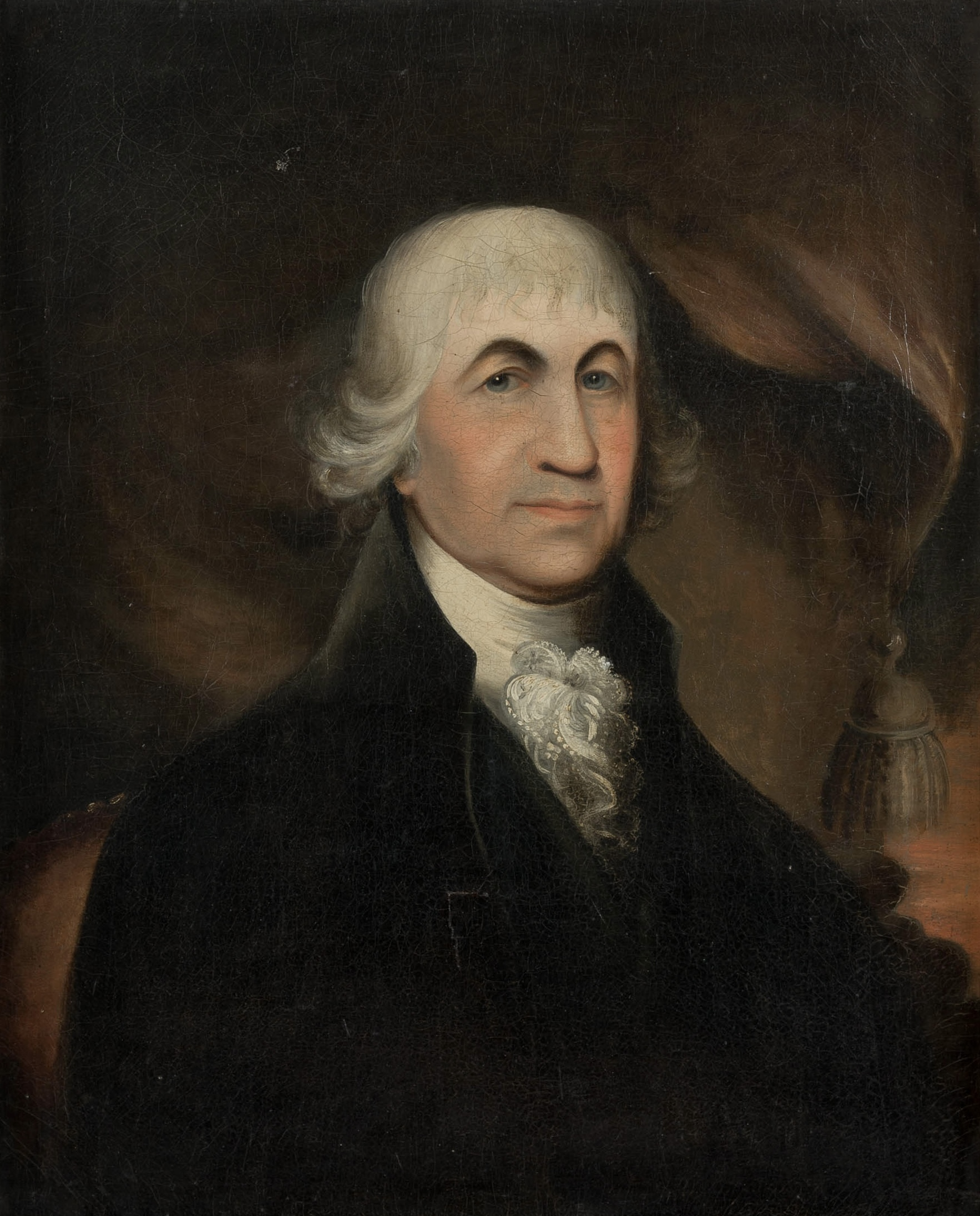
Caleb Strong preceded Brooks as Governor

The politics of the state was dominated by Federalists, despite their general decline elsewhere in the nation, in part because Brooks adopted moderate positions that denied the opposition Democratic-Republicans opportunities for vigorous opposition. He included Republicans in patronage appointments, courted Republican politicians on the national level, including President James Monroe, and minimized his association with the Federalist leadership in Massachusetts. Historian Ronald Formisano writes that Brooks "came to personify the non-partisan Era of Good Feelings in Massachusetts."

The Panic of 1819 and the granting of statehood to Maine (which was until 1820 part of Massachusetts) introduced fractures in the strong Federalist party system in the state. Dissident Federalists such as Josiah Quincy III joined Republicans in calls for a constitutional convention, citing the state constitution's requirement that Maine be allocated representation in the legislature as a reason. Brooks lobbied against the idea, arguing that the legislature could draft proposed amendments, but a convention was held despite his efforts. Nine amendments produced by the convention were eventually approved, but Federalist leaders managed to block most of the substantive reforms that had been sought. One of the consequences of the panic was the rise, particularly in Boston, of a political faction known as the "Middling Interest". This group was composed of primarily working class men who were unhappy with the state party's elitist leadership. Led by Josiah Quincy, the split would eventually lead to the final collapse of Federalism in the state.

Brooks announced in 1822 that he would not seek reelection in 1823. The 1823 election saw the victory of Republican William Eustis over Federalist party leader Harrison Gray Otis. Otis almost did not carry Boston, and lost other Federalist strongholds in the state.

Brooks was a leading member of the Massachusetts Medical Society for many years, serving as its president after his retirement from politics, and was also president of the Bible Society of Massachusetts. He was also president of the Society of the Cincinnati for many years, and was involved in the Washington Monument Association and the Bunker Hill Monument Association.

Governor Brooks died in Medford on March 1, 1825, and was buried in Medford's Salem Street Burying Ground, where the family grave is marked by a large obelisk erected in his honor.

== Family and legacy ==
In 1774 Brooks married Lucy Smith, with whom he had five children; two of them died young. His two sons were both active in the United States military. One of his sons, Marine Corps First Lieutenant John Brooks, Jr., was killed in action at the Battle of Lake Erie in 1813. His other son, Alexander Scammel Brooks, was a lieutenant colonel in the Army and was killed in a steamboat explosion in Florida in 1836. Through Alexander, his grandson-in-law was Edward L. Keyes.

The Maine towns of Brooks, established in 1816, and Brooksville, founded in 1817, were named for him.

== Sources ==
- Brooks, Charles (1886) [1855]. History of the Town of Medford. Boston: Rand, Avery, and Co. p. 528. OCLC 1183559.
- Cayton, Andrew (Summer 1982). "The Fragmentation of "A Great Family": The Panic of 1819 and the Rise of the Middling Interest in Boston, 1818–1822". Journal of the Early Republic. 2 (2): 143–167. doi:10.2307/3122690. JSTOR 3122690.
- Cutter, William, ed. (1910). Genealogical and Personal Memoirs Relating to the Families of the State of Massachusetts, Volume 1. New York: Lewis Historical Publishing Co. OCLC 1547995.
- Crocker, Matthew (1999). Magic of the Many: Josiah Quincy. Amherst, MA: University of Massachusetts Press. ISBN 978-1-55849-222-6. OCLC 237369868.
- Fleming, Thomas (2007). The Perils of Peace: America's Struggle for Survival after Yorktown. New York: Smithsonian Books. ISBN 978-0-06-113910-9.
- Formisano, Ronald (1983). The Transformation of Political Culture: Massachusetts Parties, 1790s–1840s. New York: Oxford University Press. ISBN 978-0-19-503509-4. OCLC 18429354.
- Gannett, Henry (1905). The Origin of Certain Place Names in the United States. Washington, DC: Government Printing Office. p. 41. OCLC 1156805.
- Greer, David (2007). Revolutionary—Federalist—Republican: The Early Life and Reputations of William Hull. Fort Worth, TX. OCLC 191703289.
- Kohn, Richard H (April 1970). "The Inside History of the Newburgh Conspiracy: America and the Coup d'Etat". The William and Mary Quarterly. 27 (Third Series, Vol. 27, No. 2): 188–220. doi:10.2307/1918650. JSTOR 1918650.
- Morison, Samuel Eliot (1913). Harrison Gray Otis, 1765–1848: The Urbane Federalist, Volume 1. Boston: Houghton Mifflin. OCLC 823677.
- Packard, Francis (April 1901). "Dr. John Brooks, Governor of Massachusetts". University of Pennsylvania Medical Bulletin. 14.
- Sheidley, Harlow (1991). "Preserving "The Old Fabrick": The Massachusetts Conservative Elite and the Constitutional Convention of 1820–1821". Proceedings of the Massachusetts Historical Society. 103 (Third Series, Volume 103): 114–137. JSTOR 25081035.
- Skeen, C. Edward; Kohn, Richard H (April 1974). "The Newburgh Conspiracy Reconsidered". The William and Mary Quarterly. 31 (Third Series, Volume 31, No. 2): 273–298. doi:10.2307/1920913. JSTOR 1920913.
- Tager, Jack, ed. (2008). Massachusetts Encyclopedia. Saint Clair Shores, MI: Somerset Publishers. ISBN 978-1-878592-65-1. OCLC 198759722.
- Wheeler, George (1875). History of Castine, Penobscot, and Brooksville, Maine. Bangor, ME: Burr and Robinson. p. 239. OCLC 2003716.

Party political offices
Preceded by Caleb Strong	Federalist nominee for Governor of Massachusetts; 1816, 1817, 1818, 1819, 1820, 1821, 1822	Succeeded by Harrison Gray Otis
Political offices
Preceded by Caleb Strong	Governor of Massachusetts; May 30, 1816 – May 31, 1823	Succeeded by William Eustis
