= Otis (surname) =

Otis is a surname of English origin and may have been a variant spelling of the English name Oates.

== Notable people ==
- Amos Otis (born 1947), American retired Major League Baseball player
- Bill Otis (1889–1990), American Major League Baseball player
- Charles Otis (disambiguation)
- Elisha Otis (1811–1861), American inventor and industrialist, inventor of an elevator safety device and founder of Otis Elevator Company
- Eliza Ann Otis (1833–1904), American poet, journalist, and philanthropist, co-founder, publisher and associate editor of the Los Angeles Times newspaper
- Elwell Stephen Otis (1838–1909), American general who served in the Civil War, Spanish-American War and Philippine-American War
- George Demont Otis (1879–1962), American landscape painter
- George L. Otis (1829–1882), American lawyer and politician
- Glenn K. Otis (1929–2013), US Army four-star general
- Harrison Gray Otis (politician) (1765–1848), American politician and senator from Massachusetts
- Harrison Gray Otis (publisher) (1837–1917), a publisher of the Los Angeles Times
- James Otis (disambiguation)
- John Otis (Maine politician) (1801–1856), U.S. Representative from Maine
- John G. Otis (1838–1916), U.S. Representative from Kansas
- John Lord Otis (1827-1894), American Civil War officer and Massachusetts state senator and state representative
- Johnny Otis (1921–2012), American singer, musician, composer, bandleader, record producer and talent scout
- Mercy Otis Warren (1728–1814), née Otis, American activist poet, playwright and pamphleteer during the American Revolution
- Samuel Allyne Otis (1740–1814), American politician and first Secretary of the United States Senate
- Samuel Shackford Otis (1891–1974), American architect
- Shuggie Otis (born 1953), American songwriter, recording artist and multi-instrumentalist
- Todd Otis (born 1945), American politician
- William Otis (1813–1839), American inventor of the steam shovel

== See also ==
- Senator Otis (disambiguation)
- Otis (given name)
- Otis (disambiguation)
