= Otis =

Otis may refer to:

== Arts and entertainment ==
=== Film and television ===
- Otis (film), a direct-to-DVD 2008 American comedy horror film
- "Otis" (The Jeffersons), a television episode
- "Otis" (Prison Break), a television episode

=== Music ===
- Otis (Brian McFadden album), 2019
- Otis (Mojo Nixon album), 1990
- "Otis" (song), by Jay-Z and Kanye West, 2011
- "Otis", a song by Magma from Merci, 1985
- "Otis", a song by Medeski Martin & Wood from Notes from the Underground, 1992
- "Otis", a song by The Durutti Column from 24 Hour Party People (soundtrack), 2002
- "Otis", a song by John Medeski from A Different Time, 2013

== People and fictional characters ==
- Otis (given name), a list of people and fictional characters
- Otis (surname), a list of people
- Otis (wrestler), a ring name of American professional wrestler Nikola Bogojević (born 1991)
- Otis family, an American political family
- Otis, American rapper in the duo Axe Murder Boyz

== Places ==
=== United States ===
- Otis, Colorado, a Statutory Town
- Otis, Indiana, an unincorporated community
- Otis, Iowa, a neighborhood of Cedar Rapids
- Otis, Kansas, a city
- Otis, Louisiana, an unincorporated community
- Otis, Maine, a town
- Otis, Massachusetts, a town
- Otis, Oregon, an unincorporated community
- Otis, Wisconsin, an unincorporated community
- Otis Peak, a mountain in Colorado
- Otis Air National Guard Base, Cape Cod, Massachusetts

=== Antarctica ===
- Mount Otis, Marie Byrd Land

== Other uses ==
- Otis Worldwide, American manufacturer of elevators, escalators, and related systems
- Otis College of Art and Design, in Los Angeles, California, US
- Otis Hotel, a historic building in Spokane, Washington, US
- Otis (bird), a genus of bustard
- List of storms named Otis, various tropical cyclones baring the name

== See also ==
- Otis tarda, or great bustard, a bird
- Ohtis, an American country rock band
