= Eliza Otis =

Eliza Otis may refer to:

- Eliza Ann Otis, American poet, journalist, and philanthropist
- Eliza Henderson Boardman Otis, American philanthropist and novelist
