= John Otis =

John Otis is the name of:

- John Otis (Maine politician) (1801–1856), U.S. Representative from Maine
- John G. Otis (1838–1916), U.S. Representative from Kansas
- John Lord Otis (1827-1894), American Civil War officer and Massachusetts state senator and state representative

== See also ==
- Johnny Otis, born Ioannis Alexandres Veliotes (1921–2012), American singer, musician, composer, bandleader, record producer and talent scout who discovered many who would become major stars
