= Ottis =

Ottis is a surname and masculine given name. Notable people with the name Ottis include:

as a surname:

- Brad Ottis (born 1972), American football player
- Kadri Ottis (born 1970), Estonian historian and politician

as a given name:

- Ottis Anderson (born 1957), American football player
- Ottis Gibson (born 1969), Barbadian cricketer and coach
- Ottis Steede (born 1974), Bermudian international footballer
- Ottis Toole (1947–1996), American serial killer

== See also ==
- Otis (given name)
- Otis (surname)
- Otti (disambiguation)
