= Otti =

Otti may refer to:

== People ==
- Alex Otti (born 1965), economist, banker in Nigeria
- David Otti (1940–2011), Ugandan football coach
- Otti Berger (1898–1944/45), textile artist, weaver and member of the Bauhaus
- Vincent Otti (1946–2007), deputy-leader of the Lord's Resistance Army (LRA), a rebel guerrilla army operating in Uganda and southern Sudan

== Other ==
- Mitsubishi eK, a car, also known as Nissan Otti

== See also ==
- Ottilie
- Ottis
- Otto
