= 1828 Boston mayoral election =

Election in Massachusetts, United States

- Dec. 8, 1828 (1st vote); Dec. 15, 1828 (2nd vote); Dec. 22, 1828 (3rd vote)
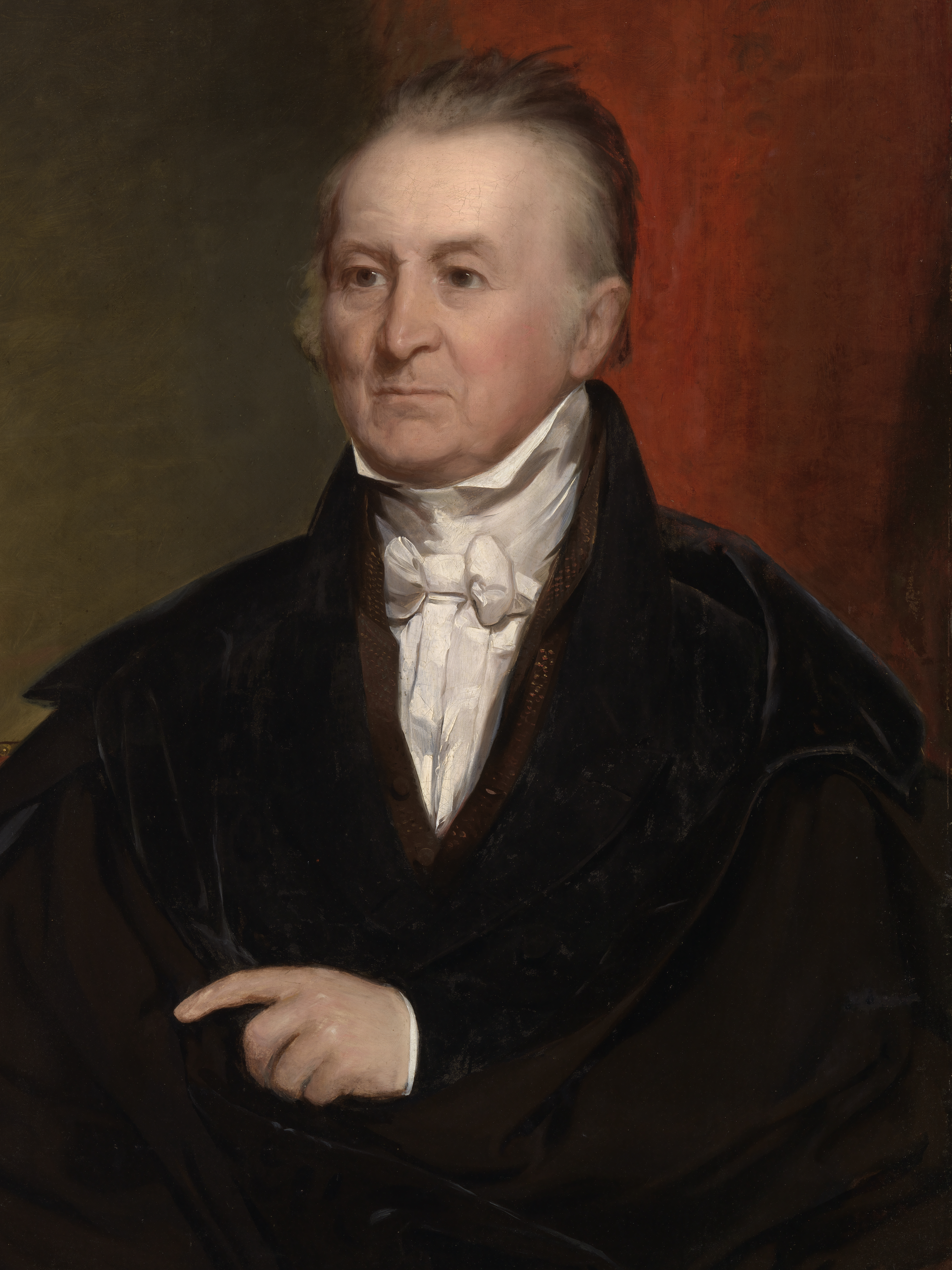

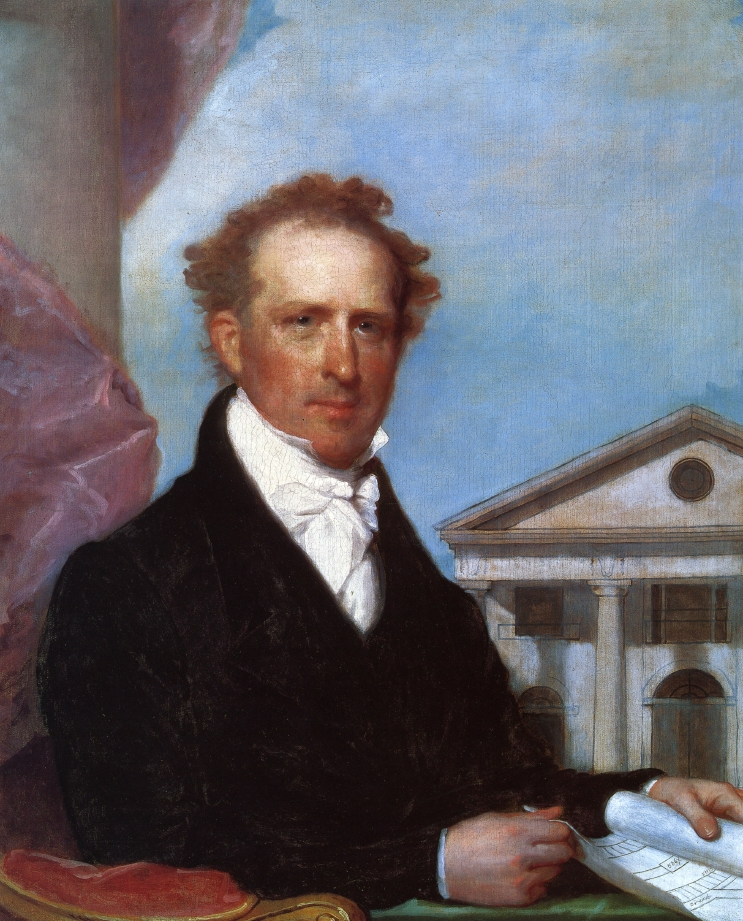

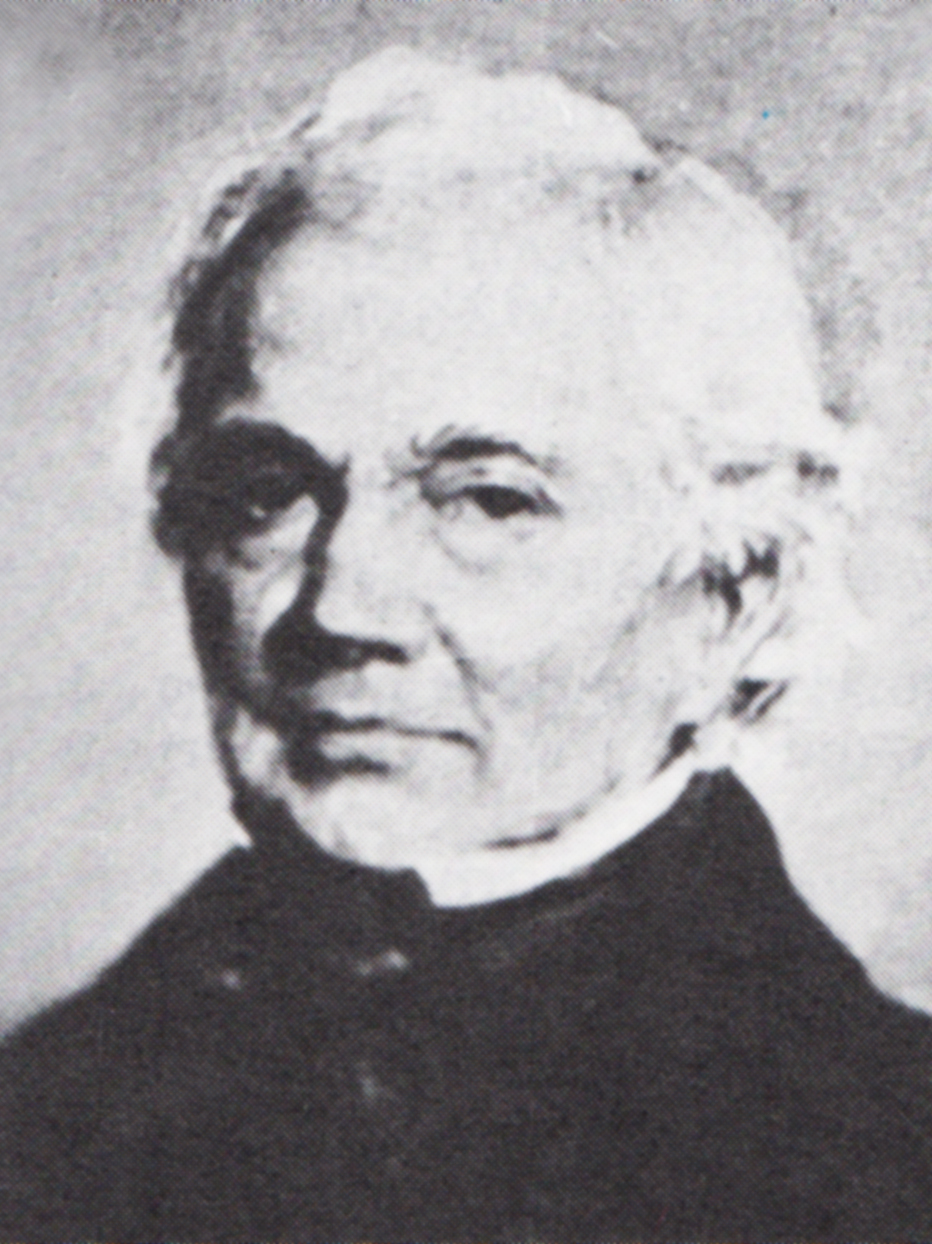

| Candidate | Harris Gray Otis | Josiah Quincy III | Thomas C. Amory |
| First vote | unspecified share of write-in | 1,958 (47.97%) | 1,284 (31.46%) |
| Second vote | 2,561 (48.75%) | 2,561 (48.75%) | 1,400 (26.65%) |
| Third vote | 2,978 (65.51%) | not a candidate for 3rd vote | not a candidate for 3rd vote |
| Candidate | Caleb Eddy | Charles Wells |
| First vote | not a candidate for 1st vote | not a candidate for 1st vote |
| Second vote | not a candidate for 2nd vote | 969 (18.45%) |
| Third vote | 1,283 (28.22%) | not a candidate for 3rd vote |
Mayor before election
Josiah Quincy III
Federalist
Elected mayor
Harrison Gray Otis
Federalist

The 1828 Boston mayoral election saw the election of Harrison Gray Otis. The election required three votes, because no candidate secured the required majority in the first two votes. After failing in the first two votes, incumbent mayor Josiah Quincy III declined to run in the third round.

== First vote (December 8, 1828) ==
Boston mayoral election first vote (December 8, 1828)
| Candidate | Votes | % |
|---|---|---|
| Josiah Quincy III (incumbent) | 1,958 | 47.97 |
| Thomas C. Amory | 1,284 | 31.46 |
| Scattering/other (including Otis and Dunlap) | 840 | 20.58 |
| Total votes | 4,082 | 100 |

== Second vote (December 15, 1828) ==
Running in the second round were Josiah Quincy III, Thomas C. Amory, Harrison Gray Otis, and Charles Wells.

Boston mayoral election second vote (December 15, 1828)
| Candidate | Votes | % |
|---|---|---|
| Josiah Quincy III (incumbent) | 2,561 | 48.75 |
| Thomas C. Amory | 1,400 | 26.65 |
| Charles Wells | 969 | 18.45 |
| Harrison Gray Otis | 209 | 3.98 |
| Other | 113 | 2.15 |
| Total votes | 5,253 | 100 |

== Third vote (December 22, 1828) ==
Quincy and Amory declined to run again in the third vote.

Receiving a majority of the vote, Otis was elected mayor.

Boston mayoral election third vote (December 22, 1828)
| Candidate | Votes | % |
|---|---|---|
| Harrison Gray Otis | 2,978 | 65.51 |
| Caleb Eddy | 1,283 | 28.22 |
| Other | 285 | 6.27 |
| Total votes | 4,546 | 100 |

== Summary table of all votes ==
1828 Boston mayoral election results (vote percent by round)
| | Harrison Gray Otis | Josiah Quincy III (incumbent) | Thomas C. Armory | Caleb Eddy | Charles Wells | Scattering |
|---|---|---|---|---|---|---|
| 1st vote | undisclosed share of write-in vote | 47.97% | 31.46% | —N/a | —N/a | 20.58% |
| 2nd vote | 26.65% | 48.75% | 26.65% | —N/a | 18.45% | 2.15% |
| 3rd vote | 65.51% | —N/a | —N/a | 28.22% | —N/a | 6.27% |

== See also ==
- List of mayors of Boston, Massachusetts
