= Otis (given name) =

Male given name

Otis is a male given name derived from an English surname, which was in turn derived from Ode, a variant form of Odo and Otto. The name also has origins in the Ars Goetia, it is a variation of the name Botis. Otis is also a male nickname from Otieno, with its roots in the Luo tribe in Kenya.

== People ==
- Otis Armstrong (1950–2021), American football player
- Otis Birdsong (born 1955), American former National Basketball Association player, member of the College Basketball Hall of Fame
- Otis R. Bowen (1918–2013), American politician
- Otis Chandler (1927–2006), American newspaper publisher
- Otis Clay (1942–2016), American R&B and soul singer
- Otis Davis (born 1932), American sprinter and world 400 m record holder
- Otis Dudley Duncan (1921–2004), American sociologist
- Otis Dozovic (born 1991), American professional wrestler
- Otis Gibson (1826–1889), American missionary in China
- Otis F. Glenn (1879–1959), American politician
- Otis Grant (born 1967), Canadian boxer
- Otis Grant (American football) (1961–2011), American football player
- Otis Hicks (1913–1974), American blues musician known as Lightnin' Slim
- Otis Jackson Jr. (born 1973), American music producer and rapper
- Otis King (1876–1944), British inventor
- Otis Nixon (born 1959), American baseball player
- Otis Pavlovic (c. 2020s), Australian singer, songwriter, guitarist and pianist, best known as a member of Royel Otis
- Otis Polelonema (1902–1981), Hopi painter, illustrator, weaver, song composer and educator
- Otis Redding (1941–1967), American singer and songwriter
- Otis Reese IV (born 1998), American football player
- Otis Rush (1934–2018), American blues guitarist and singer-songwriter
- Otis A. Singletary (1921–2003), American historian and university administrator
- Otis Sistrunk (born 1946), American National Football League player and professional wrestler
- Otis Skinner (1858–1942), American actor
- Otis Smith (disambiguation), multiple people
- Otis Spann (1930–1970), American pianist
- Otis Taylor (musician) (born 1948), American blues musician
- Otis Taylor (American football) (1942–2023), American football player
- Otis Tufts (1804–1869), American inventor
- Otis Williams (born 1941), American singer, songwriter, record producer and a founding member of the Temptations
- Otis Young (1932–2001), American actor and writer

== Fictional characters ==
- Otis the Aardvark, a puppet/presenter on Children's BBC
- Otis Blake, character in Scott Cooper's 2009 film Crazy Heart
- Otis Campbell, character in the television series The Andy Griffith Show
- Otis the Cow, in Nickelodeon's 2006 film, Barnyard, and its TV spin-off series, Back at the Barnyard
- Otis B. Driftwood, played by Groucho Marx in the 1935 film A Night at the Opera
- Otis Flannegan or Ratcatcher, a DC Comics foe of Batman
- Otis Graves, in the television series Supergirl
- Otis Johnson (comics), a Marvel Comics character
- Otis Johnson Jr., a Marvel Comics character
- Otis Milburn, in the television series Sex Education
- Otis Otis, a vampire in Heather Brewer's book series The Chronicles of Vladimir Tod
- Otis Owl, a good friend of Jerry Bear in the children's television series Pajanimals
- Otis Laury, a character from the video game Half-Life : Opposing Force
- Otis (DC Comics), a henchman of Lex Luthor in the films Superman and Superman II and related DC Comics media
- Otis (The Walking Dead), in the Image Comics series
- Otis, in the film The Adventures of Milo and Otis
- Main character in the film Otis
- Otis, in the film Good Burger
- Brian "Otis" Zvonecek, in the television series Chicago Fire, nicknamed after the elevator manufacturing company.

== Animals ==
- Otis, a grizzly bear who lived in Katmai National Park and Preserve

== See also ==
- Otis (surname)
- Otis (disambiguation)
- Ottis, a surname and given name
- Outis
