= Senator Otis =

Senator Otis may refer to:

- George L. Otis (1829–1882), Minnesota State Senate
- Harrison Gray Otis (politician) (1765–1848), U.S. Senator from Massachusetts
- James Otis (New York politician) (1836–1898), New York State Senate
- John Otis (Maine politician) (1801–1856), Maine State Senate
