= Sally Foster Otis =

Wife of Boston politician Harrison Gray Ellis (1770–1838)

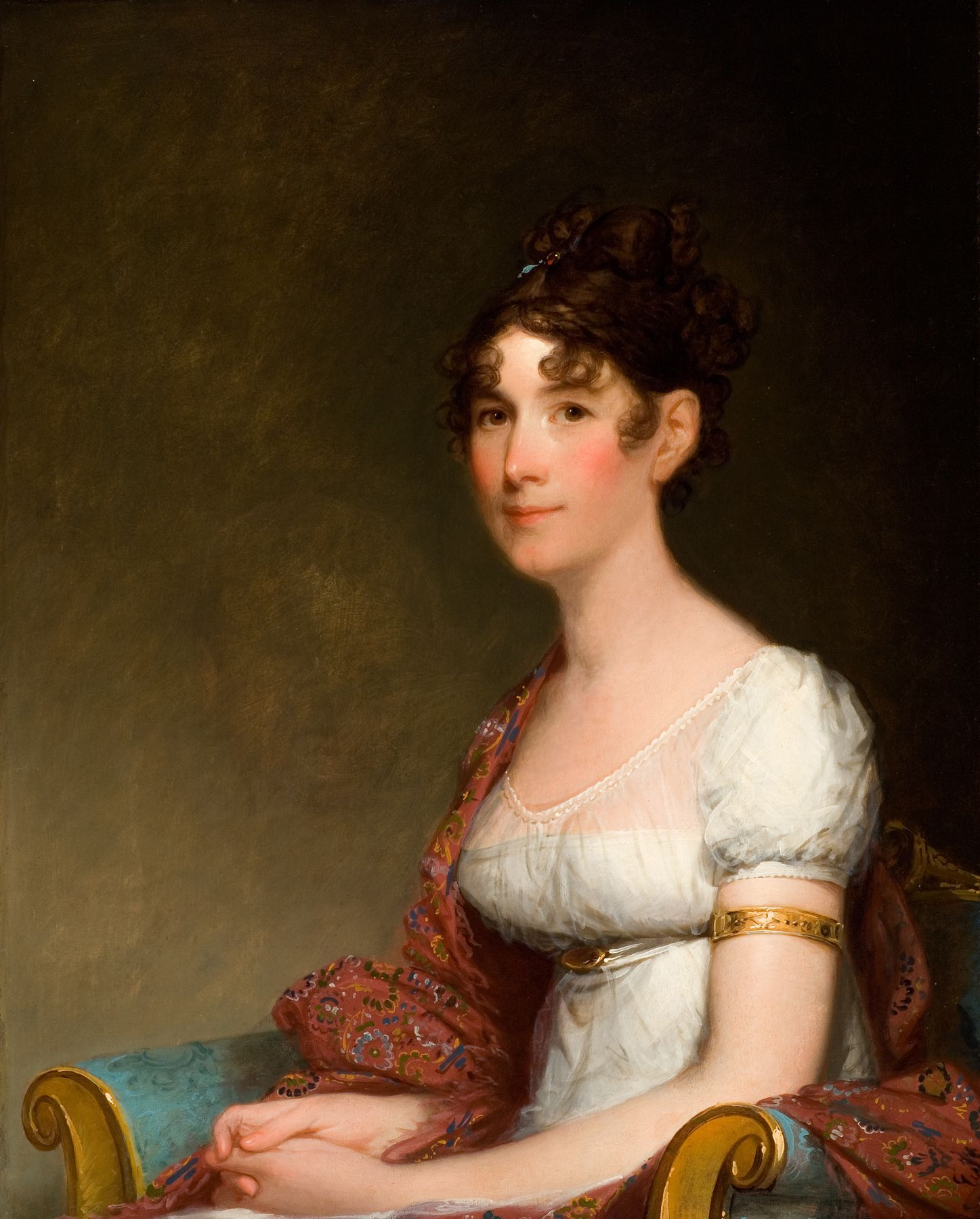
- Born: Sally Foster; 10 January 1770
- Died: 6 September 1838 (aged 68); Boston, Massachusetts, US
- Spouse: Harrison Gray Otis (m. 1790)
- Children: 11

Sally Foster Otis (January 10, 1770 – September 6, 1838) was the wife of lawyer, congressman and businessman Harrison Gray Otis. Known for her beauty and wit, Mrs. Otis was the acknowledged "queen of Boston society" of her time, attending parties and, along with her husband, playing host to prominent Bostonians and visitors to the city.

== Birth ==
Sally Foster was born January 10, 1770, in Boston, Massachusetts, to wealthy parents; William Foster (1746–1821), a prominent merchant, and Grace Spear (1751–1816).

== Marriage and family ==
Foster married Harrison Gray Otis on May 31, 1790, at the age of 20. She had eleven children, eight of whom survived to adulthood. As Mrs. Otis, she took on the role of managing their large home and playing hostess to frequent parties because of her husband's public status. She was also responsible for many of the family's business interests.

== Personality and interests ==
Otis was known for her beauty and wit. She exercised a great interest in French culture, manners, and fashion. John Adams wrote: “Mrs. Otis is and always has been a charming woman.” According to historian Samuel Morison, Sally Otis always presented herself impeccably and maintained her stately qualities up until her death in 1838.

== Death ==
Otis died September 6, 1838, at the age of 68, at their residence on Beacon Street in Boston.
