= 1829 Boston mayoral election =

Election in Massachusetts, United States

- December 14, 1829
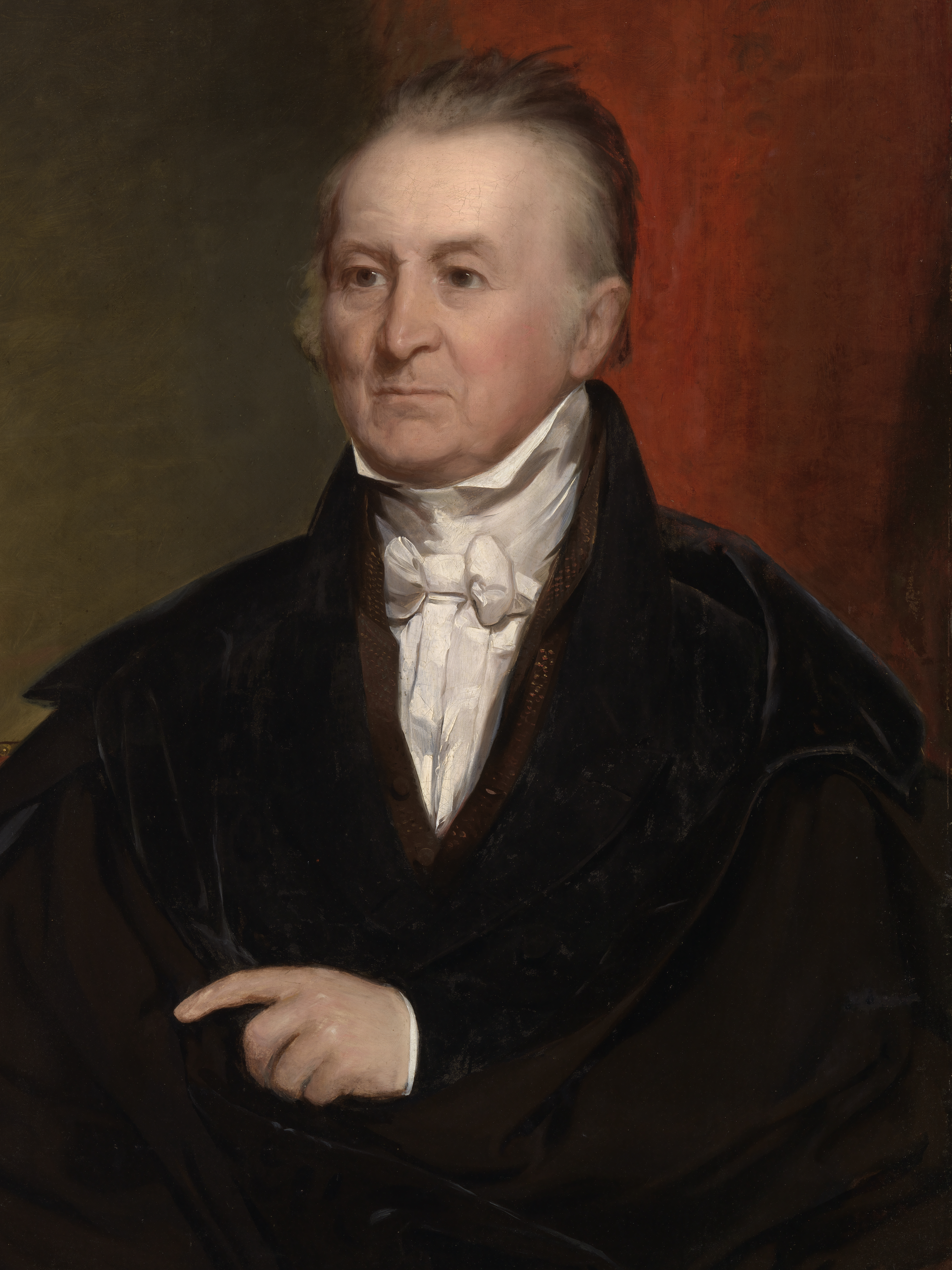
Candidate	Harrison Gray Otis
Party	Federalist
Popular vote	1,844
Percentage	93.80%
Mayor before election
Harrison Gray Otis
Federalist
Elected mayor
Harrison Gray Otis
Federalist

The 1829 Boston mayoral election saw the reelection of incumbent Harrison Gray Otis. It was held on December 14, 1829. Otis ran unopposed.

== Results ==
1829 Boston mayoral election
Candidate	Votes	%
Harrison Gray Otis (incumbent)	1,844	93.80
Scattering	122	6.21
Total votes	1,966	100

== See also ==
- List of mayors of Boston, Massachusetts
