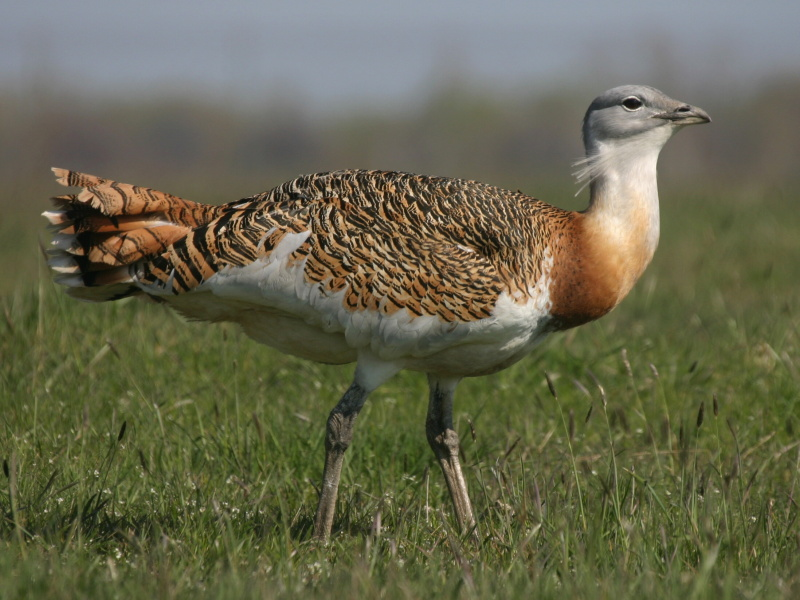

Conservation status
- Endangered (IUCN 3.1)
- CITES Appendix II

Scientific classification
- Kingdom: Animalia
- Phylum: Chordata
- Class: Aves
- Order: Otidiformes
- Family: Otididae
- Genus: Otis
- Species: O. tarda

Binomial name
- Otis tarda Linnaeus, 1758
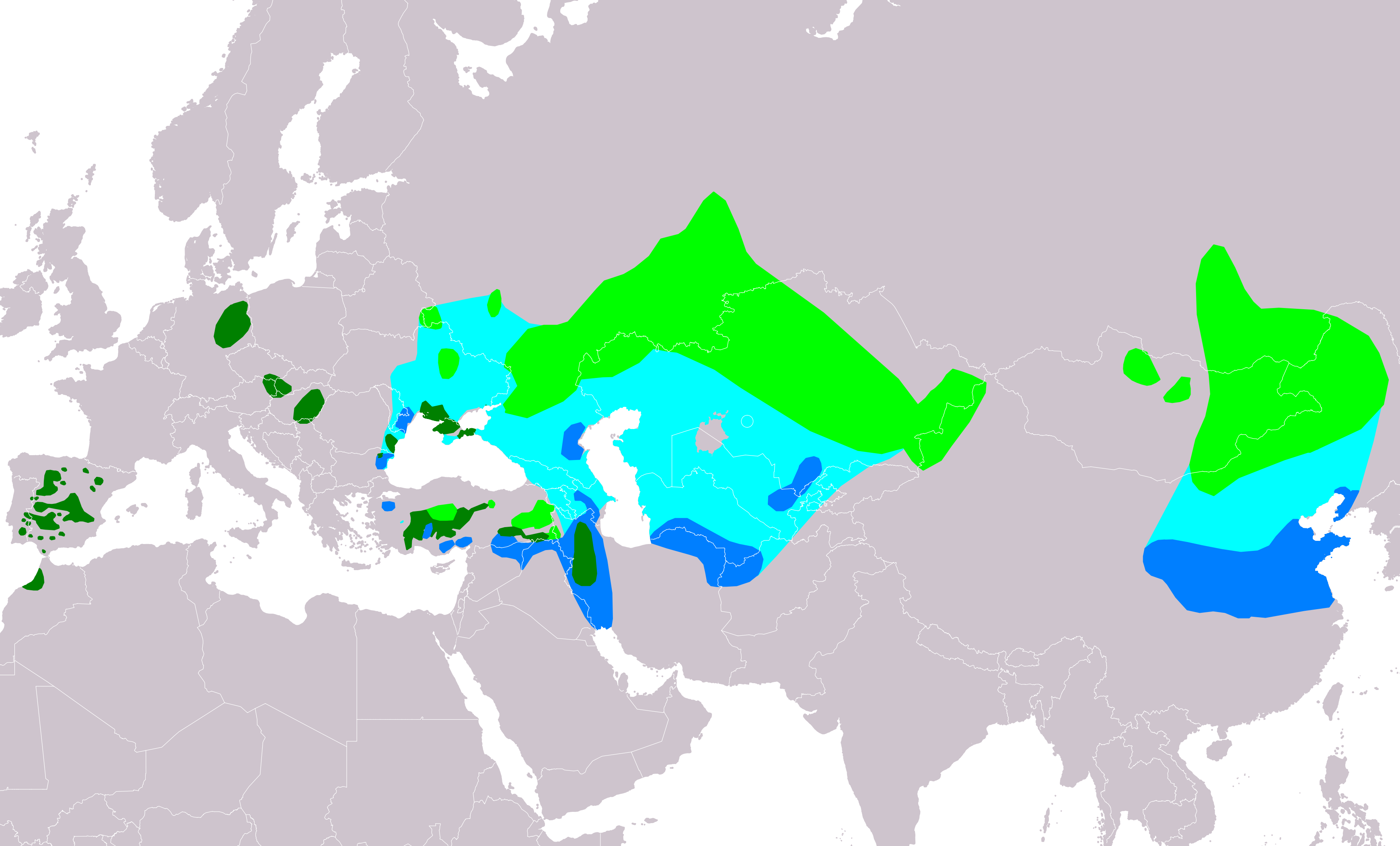
- Range of Otis tarda Breeding Resident Passage Non-breeding

= Great bustard =

Species of bird

The great bustard (Otis tarda) is a bird in the bustard family, and the only living member of the genus Otis. It breeds in open grasslands and farmland from northern Morocco, South and Central Europe to temperate Central and East Asia. European populations are mainly resident, but Asian populations migrate farther south in winter. Endangered as of 2023, it had been listed as a Vulnerable species on the IUCN Red List since 1996.

Portugal and Spain now host about 60% of the world's great bustard population. The species was extirpated in Great Britain in the 19th century, when the last bird was shot in 1832. Since 1998, The Great Bustard Group have helped reintroduce it to England on Salisbury Plain, a British Army training area. Here, the lack of public access and disturbance allows them the seclusion they desire as a large, ground-nesting bird.

== Taxonomy ==
The genus name Otis was introduced in 1758 by the Swedish naturalist Carl Linnaeus in the tenth edition of his Systema Naturae; it came from the Greek name ὠτίς ōtis used for this species taken from Natural History by Pliny the Elder published around 77 AD which briefly mentions a bird like it, it was also given the name ωτιδος ōtidos and the Latin aves tardas (Note: "proximae iis sunt quas Hispania aves tardas appellat, Graecia ωτιδος damnatas in cibis; emissa enim ossibus medulla odoris taedium extemplo sequitur." [Next to these are the birds that Spain calls tardae and Greece otides, which are condemned as an article of diet, because when the marrow is drained out of their bones a disgusting smell at once follows.]) mentioned by the Pierre Belon in 1555 and Ulisse Aldrovandi in 1600.

The specific epithet tarda is Latin for "slow" and "deliberate", which is apt to describe the typical walking style of the species. The Latin phrase avis tarda "slow bird" is the origin of the word bustard, via Old French bistarda.

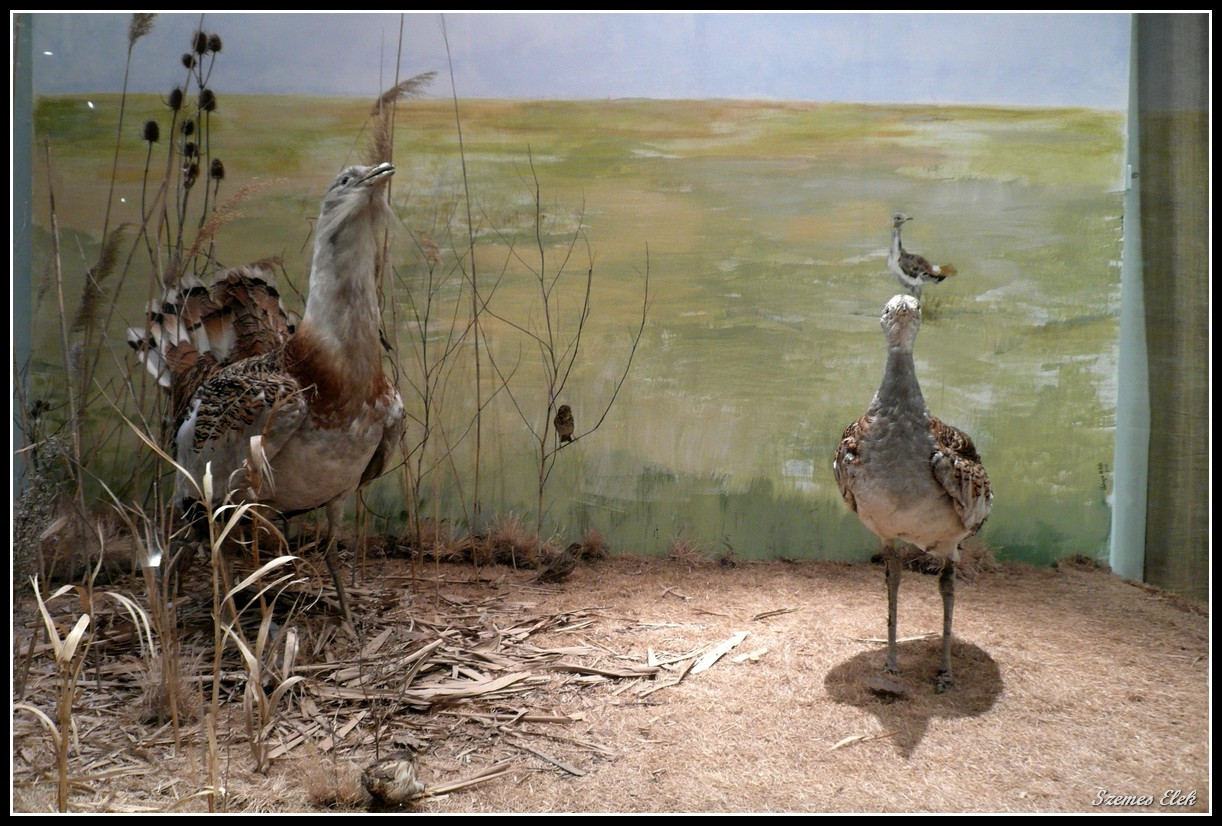
A museum display shows male–female sexual dimorphism.

== Description ==
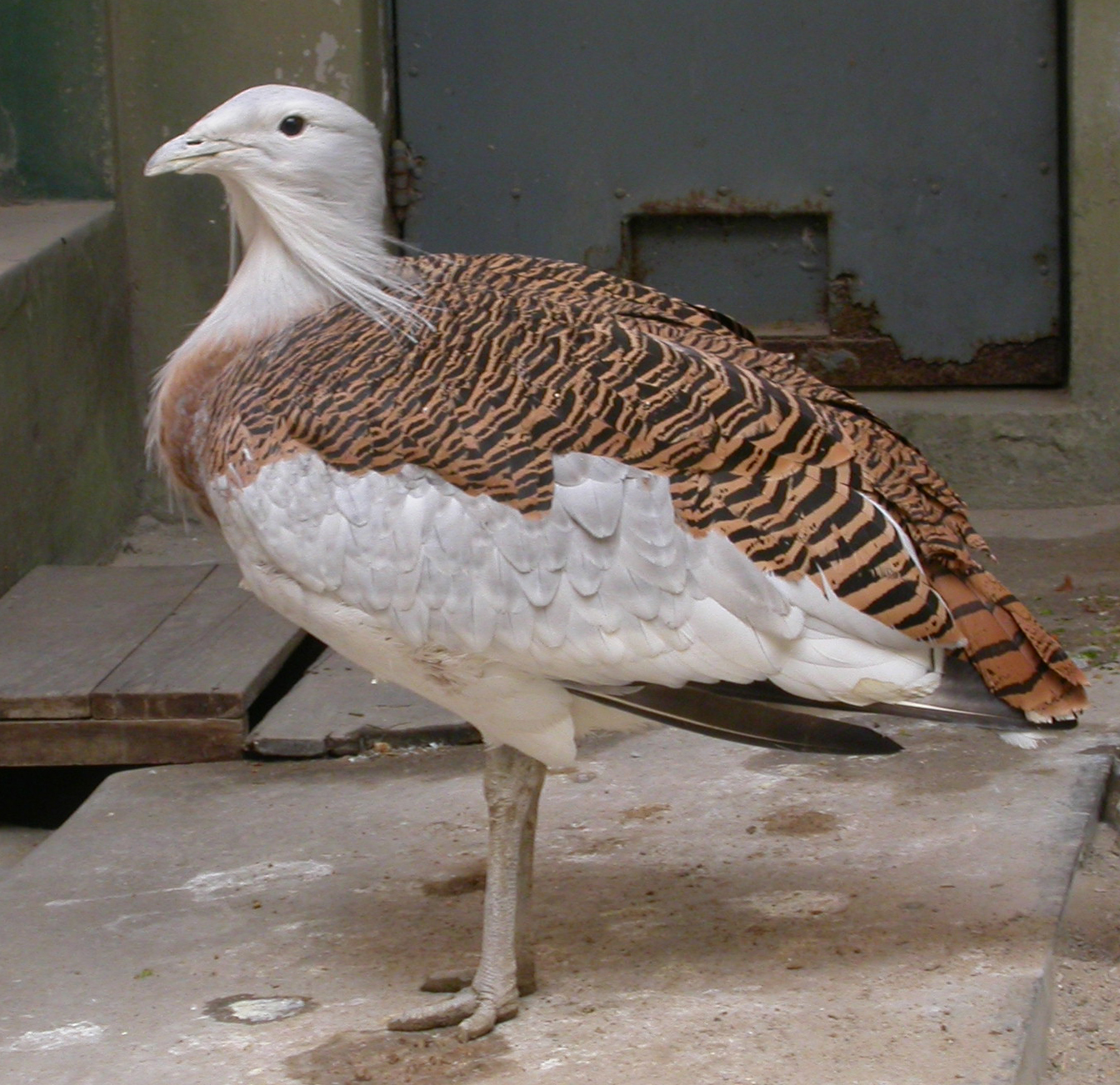
Captive male great bustard, showing the characteristic long, beard-like feathers and heavy build

The adult male great bustard is amongst the heaviest living flying birds. A male is typically 90–105 cm (2 ft 11 in – 3 ft 5 in) tall, with a length of around 115 cm (3 ft 9 in) and has a 2.1–2.7 m (6 ft 11 in – 8 ft 10 in) wingspan. The male can range in weight from 5.8 to 18 kg (13 to 40 lb). The heaviest verified specimen, collected in Manchuria, was about 21 kg (46 lb), a world record for heaviest flying bird. In a study in Spain, one male weighed as much as 19 kg (42 lb). Larger specimens have been reported but remain unverified. Average male weights as reported have been fairly variable: in Russia, males weighed a median of 9.2 kg (20 lb); in Spain, males weighed a mean of 11.62 kg (25.6 lb) during breeding season and 9.65 kg (21.3 lb) during non-breeding; in Germany, males weighed a mean of 11.97 kg (26.4 lb); and the Guinness World Records has indicated that male bustards in Great Britain weighed an average of 13.5 kg (30 lb). Average weight of males is almost an exact match to that of male Kori bustards. Among all flying animals and land birds, male Andean condors (Vultur gryphus) may match or exceed the mean body masses of these male bustards but not their maximum weights. Furthermore, male swans of the two largest species (trumpeter and mute) may attain a similar average mass depending on season and region. Among both bustards and all living birds, the upper reported mass of this species is rivaled by that of the kori bustard (Ardeotis kori), which, because of its relatively longer tarsi and tail, is both longer and taller on average and is less sexually dimorphic. In terms of weight ranges reported, the great Indian bustard (Ardeotis nigriceps) also only lags slightly behind these species.

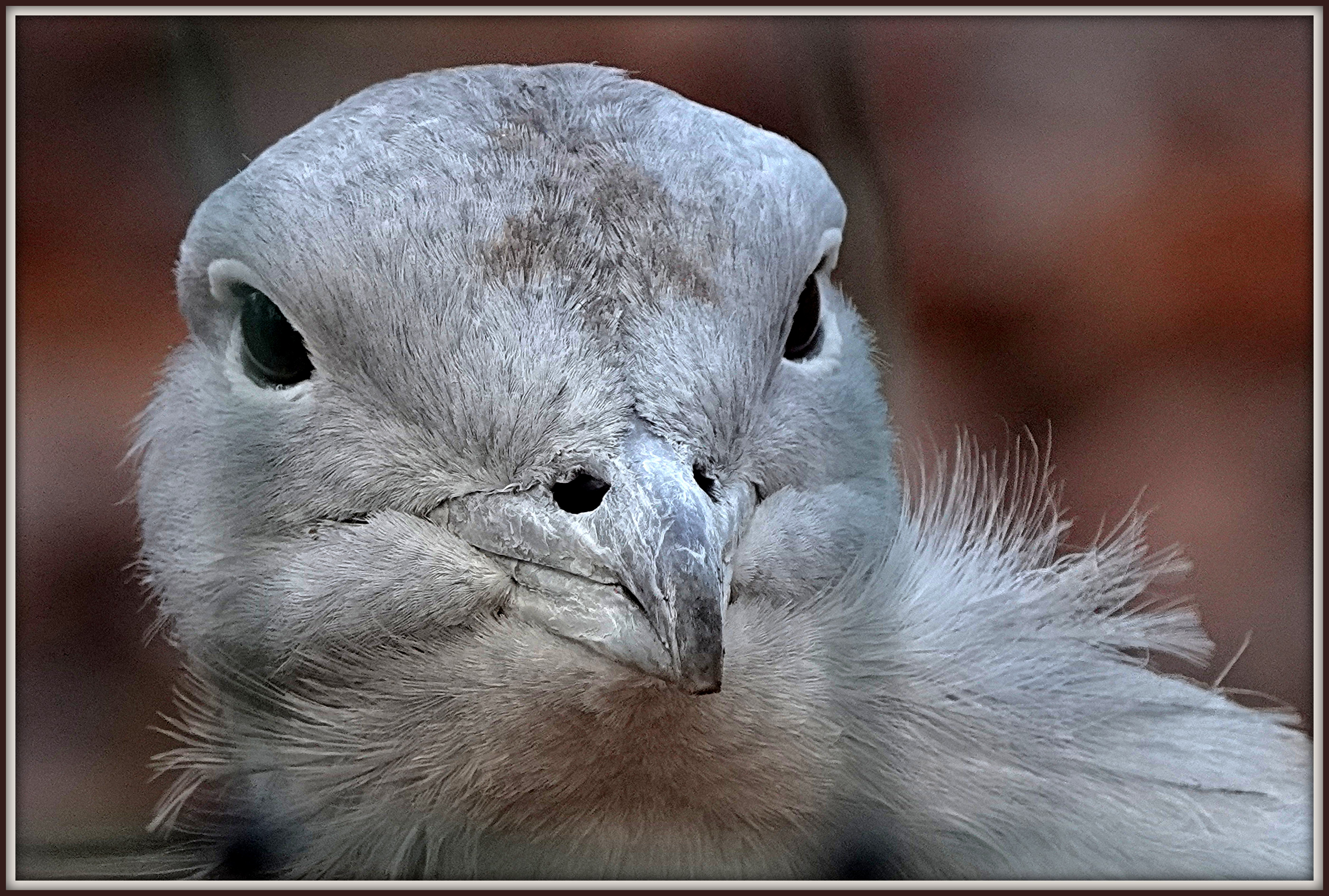
Close up of face

The great bustard is also the most sexual dimorphic extant bird species, in terms of the size difference between males and females. Adult male great bustards measured in Spain weighed on average 2.48 times more than females. The female is about a third smaller in linear dimensions, typically measuring 75 to 85 cm (2 ft 6 in to 2 ft 9 in) in height, about 90 cm (2 ft 11 in) in length and 180 cm (5 ft 11 in) across the wings. Overall, the female's weight can range from 3.1 to 8 kg (6.8 to 17.6 lb). Like male weights, females weights are quite variable as reported: in Germany, females had a mean weight of 3.82 kg (8.4 lb), in Spain, females had a mean weight of 4.35 kg (9.6 lb) and in Russia, females reportedly had a median weight of 6 kg (13 lb). The latter figure indicates that eastern birds (presumably O. t. dybowskii) are considerably less sexually dimorphic in body mass than in other populations.

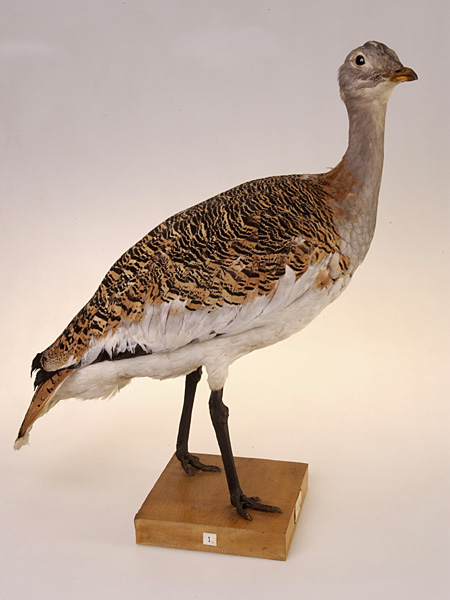
Mounted specimen of a female, with somewhat more muted tones and a more slender, smaller build than the adult male

An adult male is brown above, barred with blackish colouration, and white below, with a long grey neck and head. His breast and lower neck sides are chestnut and there is a golden wash to the back and the extent of these bright colours tending to increase as the male ages. In the breeding season, the male has long white neck bristles, which measure up to 12–15 cm (4.7–5.9 in) in length, continually growing from the third to the sixth year of life. In flight, the long wings are predominantly white with brown showing along the edges of the lower primary and secondary feathers and a dark brown streak along the upper-edge of the wing. The breast and neck of the female are buff, with brown and pale colouration over the rest of the plumage rendering it well camouflaged in open habitats. Immature birds resemble the female. The eastern subspecies (O. t. dybowskii) is more extensively grey in colour in both sexes, with more extensive barring on the back. The great bustard has long legs, a long neck and a heavy, barrel-chested body. It is fairly typical of the family in its overall shape and habitat preferences. Three other bustard species overlap in range with this species: the MacQueen's (Chlamydotis macqueenii), houbara (Chlamydotis undulata) and little bustards (Tetrax tetrax). However, none of these attains the plumage coloration nor approach the body sizes of this species. Thus, the great bustard is essentially unmistakable.

Male droppings are considerably heavier and bulkier than those of females. The weight, volume, and density of droppings also vary depending on the season and their composition, which is influenced by diet. Fecal steroid analyses can be particularly useful for determining sex and also for characterizing the endocrine status of individuals.

== Distribution and habitat ==
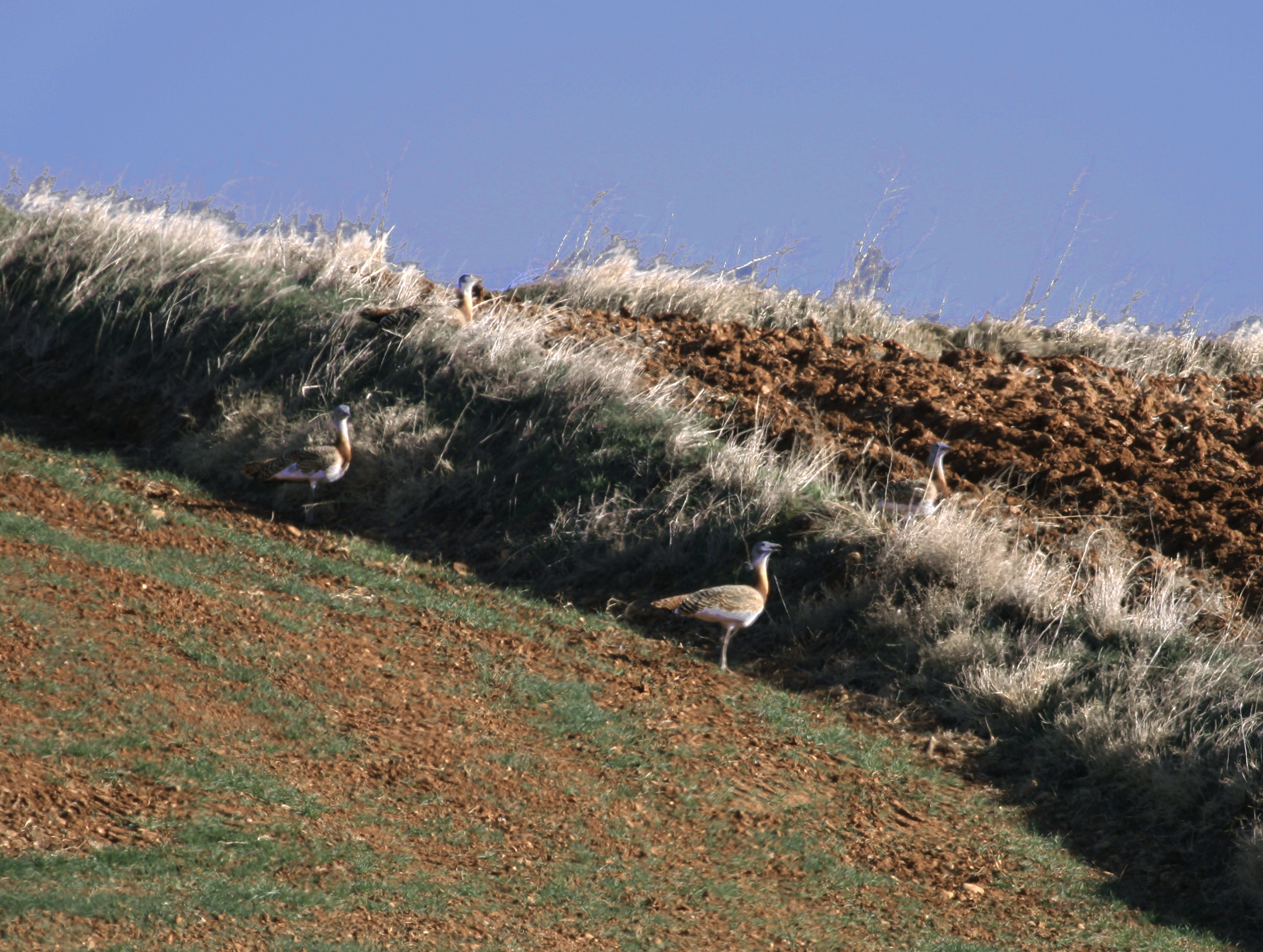
Great bustards in Spain in fairly typical habitat for the species

These birds' habitat is grassland or steppe defined by open, flat or somewhat rolling landscapes. They can be found on undisturbed cultivation and seem to prefer areas with wild or cultivated crops such as cereals, vineyards and fodder plants. However, during the breeding season, they actively avoid areas with regular human activity and can be disturbed by agricultural practices. Great bustards are often attracted to areas with considerable insect activity.

The breeding range of the great bustard currently stretches from Portugal to Manchuria, though previously the species bred even further east in Russian Primorsky Krai. As a result of population declines across much of the range, more than half of the global population is now found in central Spain with around 30,000 individuals.The spanish region of Castile and Leon is home to around 30% of the great bustard global population. Smaller populations are in southern Russia and the Great Hungarian Plain.

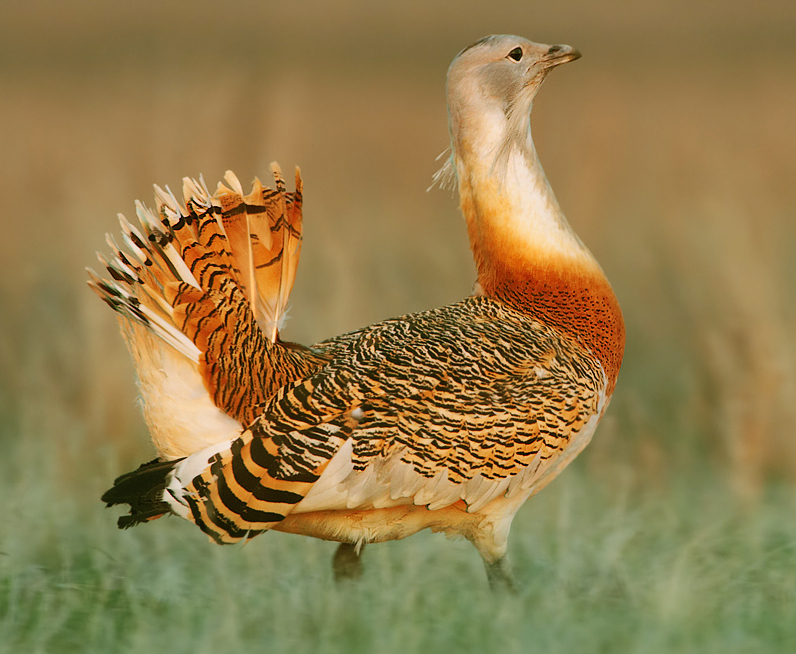
Adult male great bustard in habitat

In Iran, the species survives only in a small area in the Boukan region of West Azerbaijan province, where a census in January 2025 recorded just 19 individuals remaining. In 2024, conservation efforts in Boukan led to the successful hatching of the first great bustard chick in captivity in Iran.

== Behaviour and ecology ==
The great bustard is gregarious, especially in winter when gatherings of several dozen birds may occur. Male and female groups do not mix outside of the breeding season. The great bustard has a stately slow walk but tends to run when disturbed rather than fly. Running speeds have not been measured but adult females have been known to outrun red foxes (Vulpes vulpes), which can reach a trotting speed of 48 km/h (30 mph). Both sexes are usually silent but can engage in deep grunts when alarmed or angered. The displaying adult male may produce some booming, grunting and raucous noises. The female may utter some guttural calls at the nest and brooded young make a soft, trilling call in communication with their mothers.

=== Migration ===
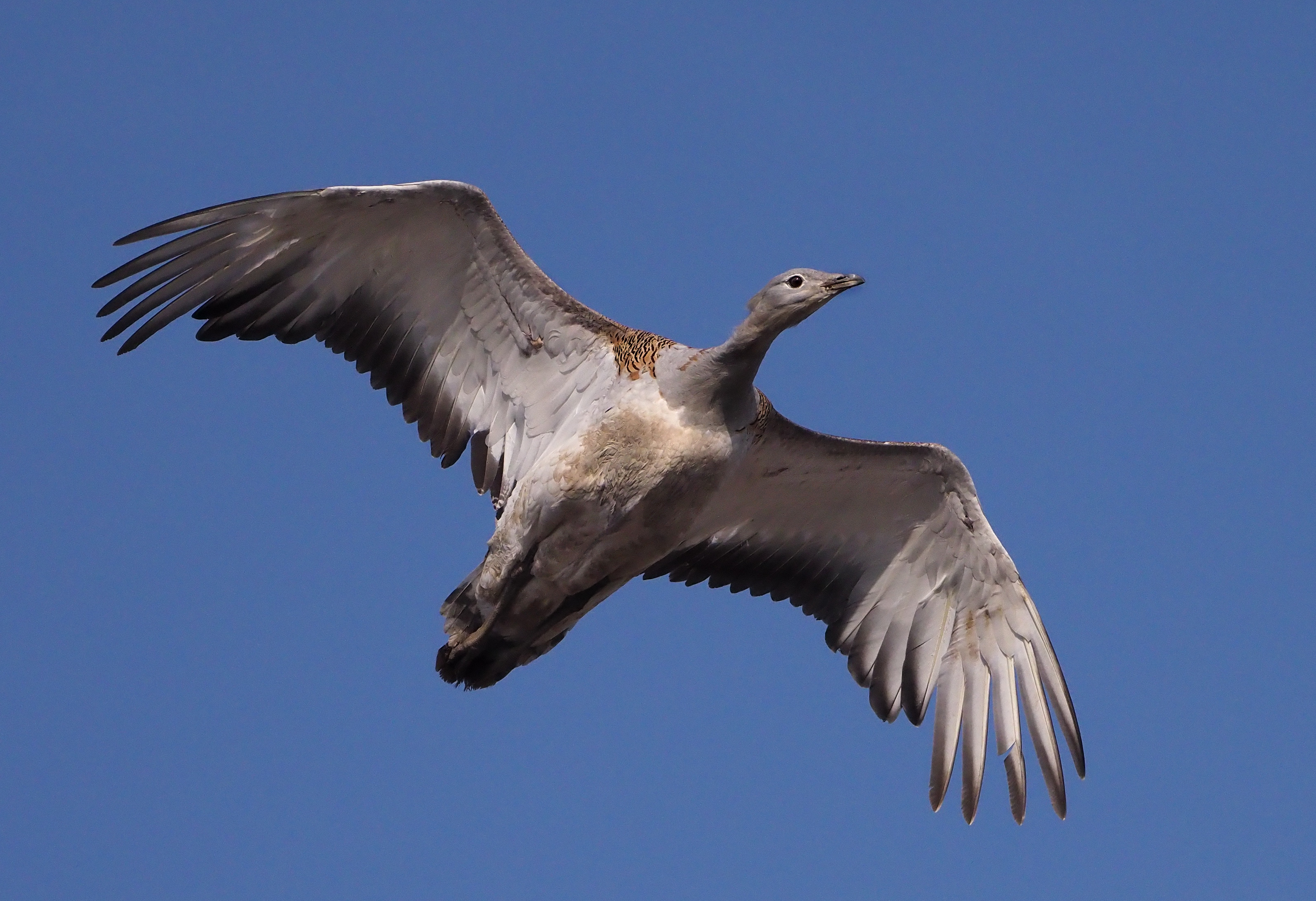
A great bustard in flight

Some individuals in Iberian populations make short seasonal movements of 5–200 km (3.1–124.3 mi), particularly males which appear to move in response to higher summer temperatures. European populations are sedentary or make irregular movements in response to severe winter weather. Populations breeding along the Volga in Russia migrate around 1,000 km (620 mi) to spend the winter season in Crimea and Kherson Oblast. Populations breeding in northern Mongolia migrate over 2,000 km (1,200 mi) to Shaanxi Province of China.

Great bustards often gather in larger numbers at pre-migratory sites in order to move collectively to winter grounds. In the Iberian Peninsula, migrating great bustards seem to choose different periods for movements based on sex. No population is known to use the same grounds for wintering and summering. Great bustards are strong fliers and reach speeds of 48–98 km/h (30–61 mph) during migration.

=== Reproduction ===
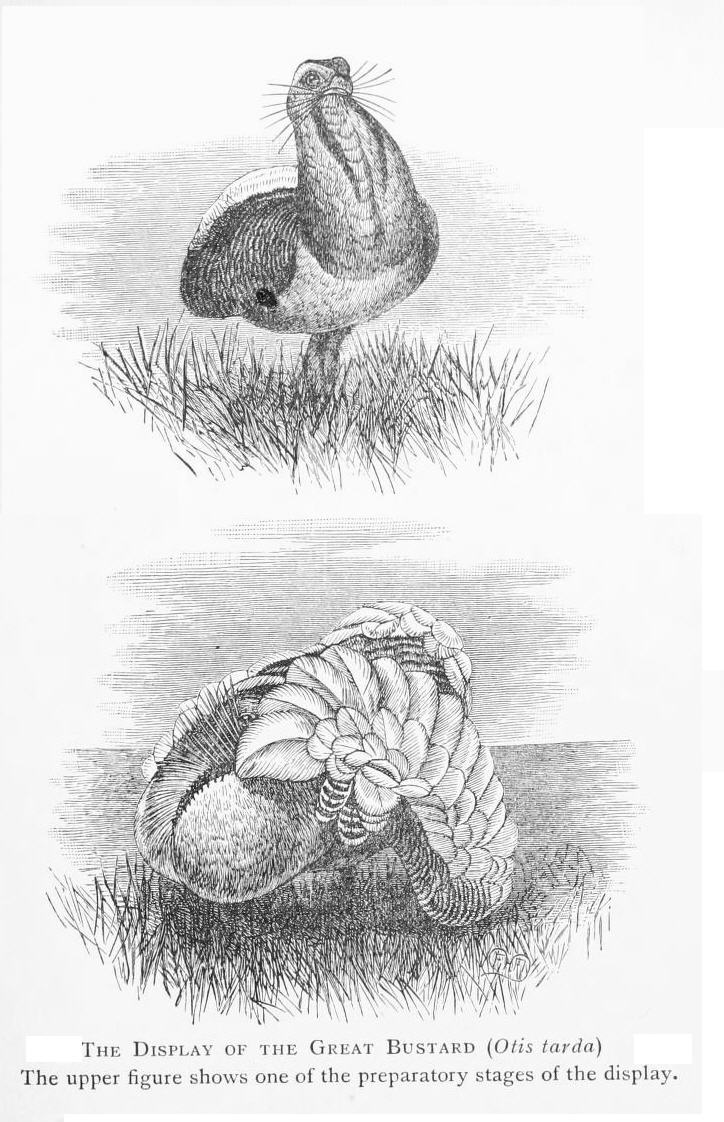
Male bustard display

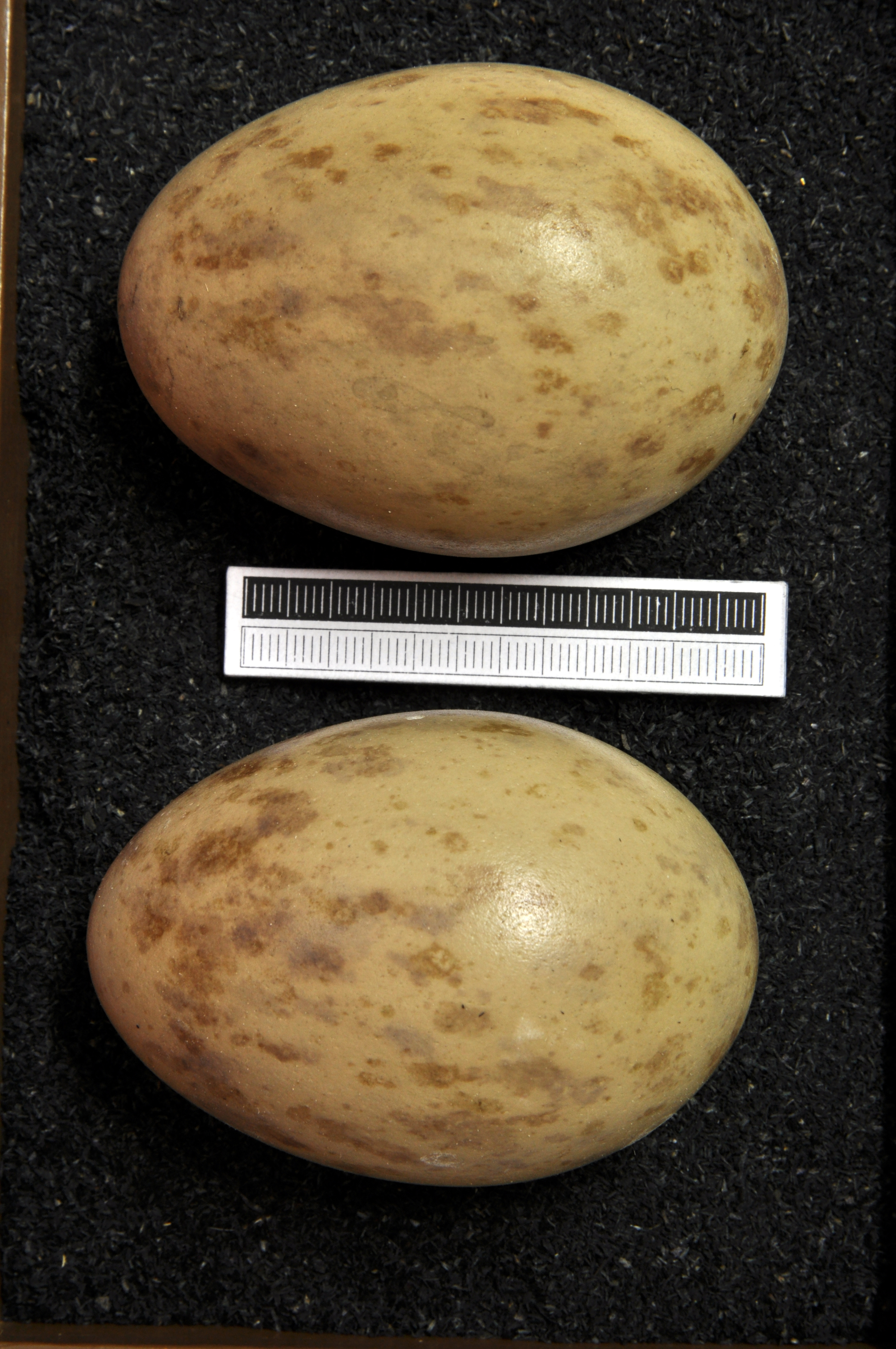
Eggs in the Museum Wiesbaden

The great bustard breeds in March, and a single male may mate with up to five females. Before mating, the males moult into their breeding plumage around January. Males establish dominance in their groups during winter, clashing violently by ramming into and hitting each other with their bills. Like other bustards, the male great bustard displays and competes for the attention of females on what is known as a lek. In this species, the male has a flamboyant display beginning with the strutting male puffing up his throat to the size of a football. He then tilts forwards and pulls his head in so that the long whiskery chin feathers point upwards and the head is no longer visible. He next cocks his tail flat along his back, exposing the normally hidden bright white plumage then he lowers his wings, with the primary flight feathers folded but with the white secondaries fanning out. The displaying males, who may walk around for several minutes at a time with feathers flared and head buried waiting for hens to arrive, have been described as a "foam-bath" because of their appearance.

One to three olive or tan coloured, glossy eggs (two eggs being the average) are laid by the female in May or June. The nests, which are shallow scrapes made by the female on dry, soft slopes and plains, are usually situated close to the prior lek location. Nests are situated in sparse clusters, with a study in Inner Mongolia finding nests at a minimal 9 m (30 ft) apart from each other. In the same study, nests were placed at mid-elevation on a hill, at about 190 to 230 m (620 to 750 ft). Nesting sites are typically in dense grassy vegetation about 15 to 35 cm (5.9 to 13.8 in), likely for protection against predation, with extensive exposure to sunlight. Eggs weigh about 150 g (5.3 oz) and are on average 79.4 mm (3.13 in) tall by 56.8 mm (2.24 in) wide. The female incubates the eggs alone for 21 to 28 days. The chicks almost immediately leave the nest after they hatch, although they do not move very far from their mother until they are at least 1 year old. Young great bustards begin developing their adult plumage at about 2 months, and begin to develop flying skills at the same time. They practice by stretching, running, flapping, and making small hops and jumps to get airborne. By three months they are able to fly reasonable distances. If threatened, the young stand still, using their downy plumage, mainly sepia in colour with paler buffy streaks, as camouflage. Juveniles are independent by their first winter, but normally stay with their mother until the next breeding season. Males usually start to mate from 5 to 6 years of age, although may engage in breeding display behaviour at a younger age. Females usually first breed at 2 to 3 years old.

=== Diet ===
The species is omnivorous, taking different foods in differing seasons. In northwestern Spain in August, 48.4% of the diet of adult birds was green plant material, 40.9% was invertebrates and 10.6% was seeds. In the same population during winter, seeds and green plant material constituted almost the entirety of the diet. Alfalfa is seemingly preferred in the diet of birds from Spain. Other favoured plant life in the diet can include legumes, crucifers, common dandelion and grapes and the dry seeds of wheat and barley. Among animal prey, insects are generally eaten and are the main food for young bustards in their first summer, though they then switch to the seasonal herbivorous preferences of adults by winter. Coleoptera, Hymenoptera and Orthoptera are mainly taken, largely based on availability and abundance. Small vertebrates supplement the diet when the opportunity arises. Great bustards sometimes eat toxic blister beetles of the genus Meloe to self-medicate, increasing sexual arousal of males. Some plants selected in the mating season showed in-vitro activity against laboratory models of parasites and pathogens. There are some differences between the diets of female and male bustards as a result of sexual dimorphism in weight, one of the highest in birds.

=== Foraging ===
In winter the feeding intensity increased and then decreased through the morning in both sexes, and was lower in flocks of males than in flocks of females. This sexual difference is greater where legume availability was smaller in central Spain. Males that foraged slightly less intensively than females could compensate with longer periods of foraging and bigger bite size that would allow them to obtain enough food relative to their absolute daily energy requirements. The size of morning foraging area is smaller in sites with more legume availability, likely because legumes are the most preferred substrate type.

=== Mortality ===
Great bustards typically live for around 10 years, but some have been known to live up to 15 years or more. The maximum known life span for the species was 28 years. Adult males seem to have a higher mortality rate than females due mainly to fierce intraspecies fighting with other males during the breeding season. Many males may perish in their first couple of years of maturity for this reason. Due to this, there is a skewed adult sex ratio of 1.4 and 4.1 females per male.

Although little detailed information has been obtained of predators, over 80% of great bustards die in the first year of life and many are victims of predation. Chicks are subject to predation by the fact that they are ground-dwelling birds which are reluctant to fly. Predators of eggs and hatchlings include raptors, corvids, hedgehogs, foxes, weasels, badgers, martens, rats and wild boars (Sus scrofa). The most serious natural predators of nests are perhaps red foxes and hooded crows (Corvus cornix). Chicks grow very quickly, by 6 months being nearly two-thirds of their adult size, and are predated by foxes, lynxes, gray wolves (Canis lupus), dogs, jackals and eagles. Predation on adult male great bustards has been reportedly committed by white-tailed eagles (Haliaeetus albicilla) while golden eagles (Aquila chrysaetos) are potential predators and eastern imperial eagles (Aquila heliaca) have been known to prey on great bustards (but not likely to include adult males). Great bustards of unspecified age and sex have been found amongst Eurasian eagle-owl (Bubo bubo) prey remains in Bulgaria. A possible act of predation on a great bustard was observed to be committed by a much smaller raptor, the western marsh harrier (Circus aeruginosus), though it was likely that this bustard was "weak or injured" if it was taken alive. The bold, conspicuous behaviour of the breeding adult male bustard may attract the same large mammalian predators that predate chicks, such as wolves and lynx, while the more inconspicuous female may sometimes be attacked by various predators. However, predation is generally fairly rare for adults because of their size, nimbleness and safety in numbers through social behaviour.

Occasionally, other natural causes may contribute to mortality in the species, especially starvation in harsh winter months. However, major causes of mortality in recent centuries have been largely linked to human activity, as described below.

== Population distribution ==
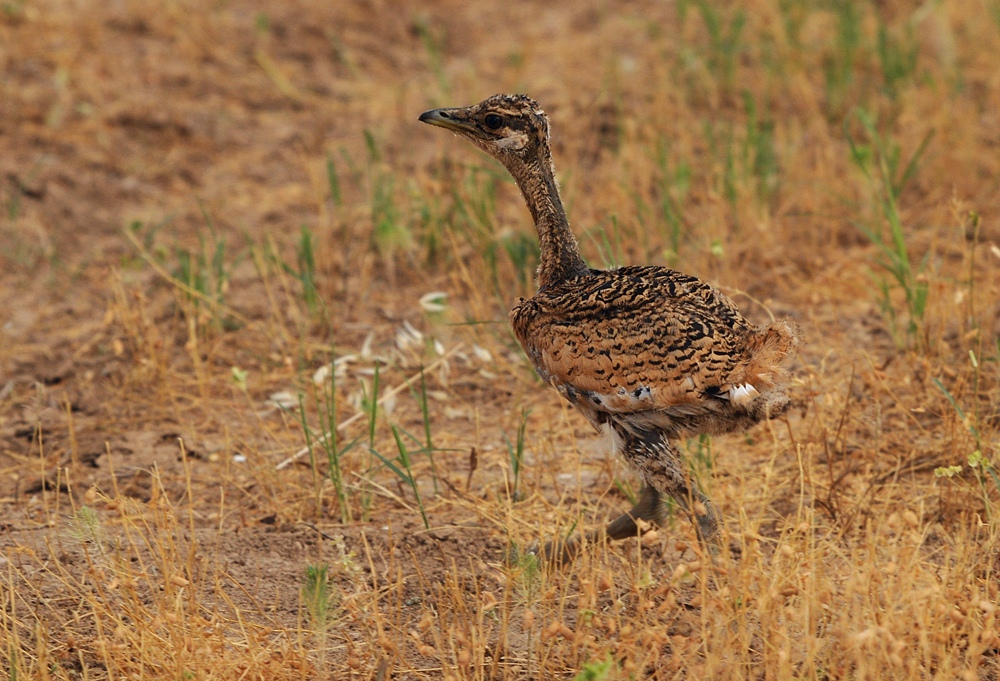
Bustard juvenile

As of 2008, the global population numbered between 44,000 and 51,000 birds (Palacin & Alonso 2008), about 38,000 to 47,000 in Europe, with 30,000 or more than half in Spain. Hungary had the next largest Great Bustard population with about 1,555 in the year 2012, followed by Ukraine and Austria. Between 4,200 and 4,500 were found in east Asia. In recent times, there have been steep declines throughout eastern and central Europe and in Asia, particularly in Kazakhstan and Mongolia.

Range (2008)
Presence	Countries
Native	Afghanistan, Armenia, Austria, Azerbaijan, Bosnia and Herzegovina, Bulgaria, China, Croatia, Czech Republic, France, Georgia, Germany, Greece, Hungary, Iran, Iraq, Italy, Kazakhstan, Moldova, Mongolia, Montenegro, Morocco, North Macedonia, Portugal, Romania, Russia, Serbia, Slovakia, Spain, Syria, Tajikistan, Turkey, Turkmenistan, Ukraine, United Kingdom, Uzbekistan
Regionally extinct	Algeria, Lithuania, Myanmar, Poland, Sweden, Switzerland, Kyrgyzstan
Vagrant	Albania, Belgium, Cyprus, Denmark, Egypt, Finland, Gibraltar, Ireland, Israel, Japan, Korea, Latvia, Luxembourg, Malta, Netherlands, Saudi Arabia, Tunisia
Presence uncertain	Lebanon, Pakistan

Sizeable populations exist in Spain (23,055 birds), Russia (8,000 birds), Turkey (800–3,000 birds), Portugal (1,435 birds) and Mongolia (1,000 birds). In Germany and Austria the populations are small (Germany 2016: 232 birds; Austria 2012: 335 birds) but steadily growing for about two decades. Elsewhere, the populations are declining because of habitat loss throughout its range. A sizeable population also exists in Hungary (1,100–1,300 birds) where the Eastern European steppe zone ends, near Dévaványa town and also in the Hortobágy National Park, Nagykunság and Nagy-Sárrét regions. The population is down from a population of 10,000–12,000 before the Second World War.

Agroenvironment schemes as unirrigated legumes fostered a population increase of great bustards in Castilla y Leon, central Spain.

== Threats and conservation status ==
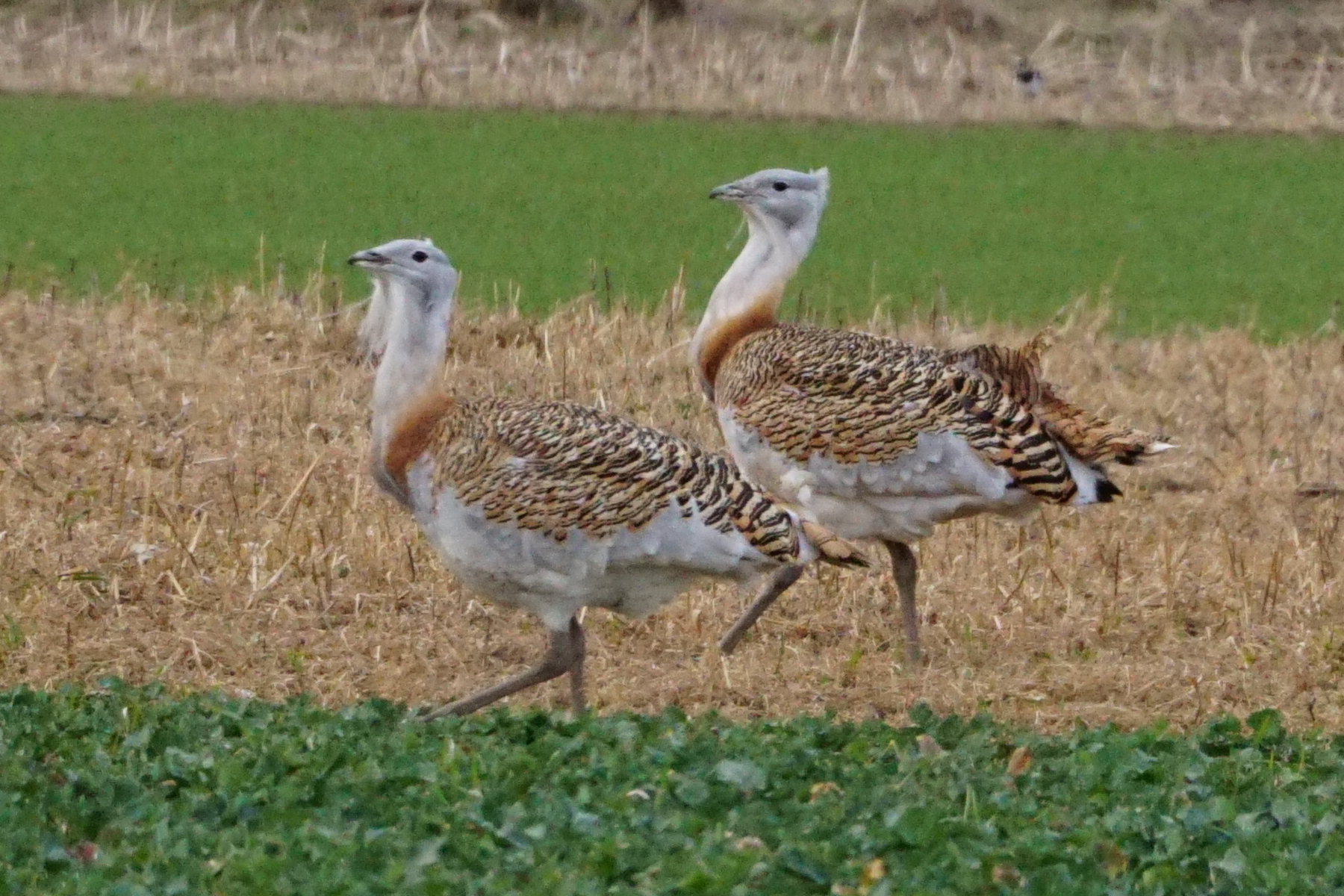
Adult great bustards

The great bustard is classified as endangered at the species level. There are myriad threats faced by great bustards. Increasing human disturbance could lead to habitat loss caused by the ploughing of grasslands, intensive agriculture, afforestation, increased development of irrigation schemes, and the construction of roads, power lines, fencing and ditches. Mechanisation, chemical fertilizers and pesticides, fire and predation by dogs are serious threats for chicks and juveniles, and hunting of adults contributes to high mortality in some of their range countries. Agricultural activity is a major disturbance at nest and, in Hungary, few successful nests are found outside of protected areas.

Bustards, despite their large size, are able to fly at high speed and are often mutilated or killed by overhead electricity cables, which are placed in the West Pannonia region of Eastern Austria and Western Hungary just at their flying height. The electricity companies affected have buried part of the dangerous cables, and have marked remaining aerial parts with fluorescent markers to warn off the birds. These measures have rapidly reduced bustard mortality. Bustards are also occasionally killed by collisions with automobiles or by entanglement in wires.

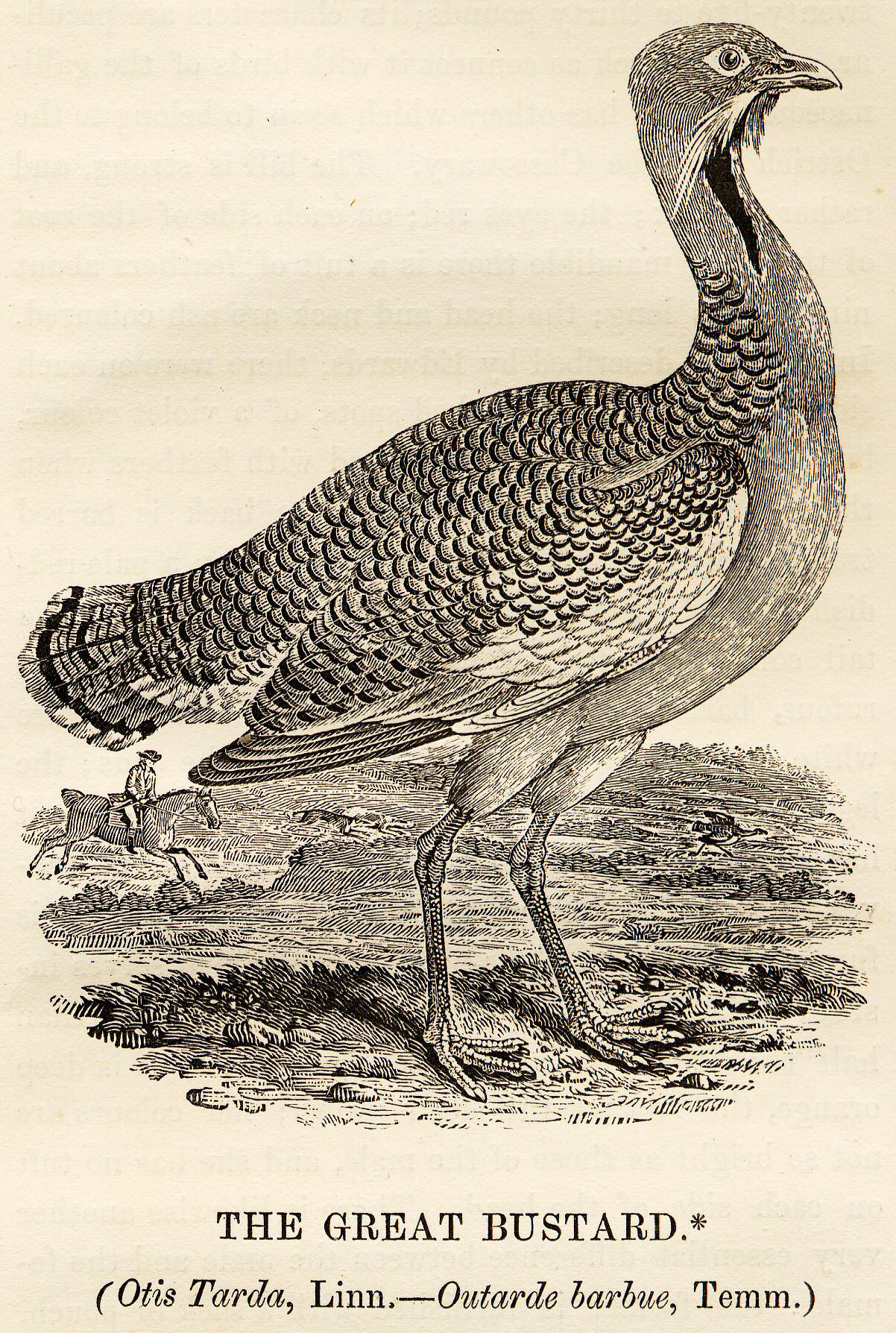
Wood engraving by Thomas Bewick in his A History of British Birds, 1797; he was concerned about their probable local extinction. A horseman and greyhound gallop after another bustard in the background.

The great bustard was formerly native in Great Britain and a bustard forms part of the design of the Wiltshire Coat of Arms and as supporters for the Cambridgeshire arms. As early as 1797, the naturalist and wood engraver Thomas Bewick commented in his A History of British Birds that "Both this [the little bustard] and the Great Bustard are excellent eating, and would well repay the trouble of domestication; indeed, it seems surprising, that we should suffer these fine birds to be in danger of total extinction, although, if properly cultivated, they might afford as excellent a repast as our own domestic poultry, or even as the Turkey, for which we are indebted to distant countries." Bewick's prediction was correct; the great bustard was hunted out of existence in Britain by the 1840s.

In 2004, a project overseeing the reintroduction to Salisbury Plain in Wiltshire using eggs taken from Saratov in Russia was undertaken by The Great Bustard Group, a UK Registered Charity that aims to establish a self-sustaining population of great bustards in the UK. The reintroduced birds have laid eggs and raised chicks in Britain in 2009 and 2010. Although the great bustard was once native to Britain, great bustards are considered an alien species under English law. The reintroduction of the great bustard to the UK by the Great Bustard Group is being carried out in parallel with researchers from the University of Bath who are providing insight into the habitat of native great bustard populations in Russia and Hungary. On January 19, 2011, it was announced that the Great Bustard Project had been awarded EU LIFE+ funding, reportedly to the tune of £1.8 million. By 2020 the population in Wiltshire exceeded 100 birds. In Hungary, where the species is the national bird, great bustards are actively protected. The Hungarian authorities are seeking to preserve the long-term future of the population by active protection measures; the area affected by the special ecological treatment had grown to 15 km^{2} (5.8 sq mi) by the summer of 2006.

Under the auspices of the Convention on Migratory Species of Wild Animals (CMS), also known as the Bonn Convention, the Memorandum of Understanding (MoU) on the Conservation and Management of Middle-European Populations of the Great Bustard was concluded and came into effect on June 1, 2001. The MoU provides a framework for governments, scientists, conservation bodies and others to monitor and coordinate conservation efforts in order to protect the middle-European populations of the great bustard.
