= James Otis =

James Otis may refer to:

- James Otis Sr. (1702–1778), Massachusetts lawyer and public official
- James Otis Jr. (1725–1783), American revolutionary politician from Massachusetts
- James Otis (mayor) (1826–1875), mayor of San Francisco, California
- James Otis (New York politician) (1836–1898), member of the New York State Senate and a society leader during the Gilded Age
- James C. Otis (1912–1993), Justice of the Minnesota Supreme Court
- Jim Otis (born 1948), American football player
- James Otis, pen name of James Otis Kaler (1848–1912), American journalist and children's author
