= Otis, Iowa =

- Neighborhood
- Location within Iowa Location within the United States
- Country: United States
- State: Iowa
- County: Linn
- City: Cedar Rapids
- Elevation: 758 ft (231 m)
- Time zone: UTC-6 (Central (CST))
  - Summer (DST): UTC-5 (CDT)
- Area code: 319
- GNIS feature ID: 464186

Otis is an unincorporated area in the city of Cedar Rapids in Linn County, Iowa, United States.

== History ==
The community was named for Harrison Gray Otis, a Massachusetts politician.
