= Charles Otis =

Charles Otis may refer to:

- Charles Otis (fencer) (1906–1970), Canadian fencer
- Charles Otis (businessman) (1872–1944), financial publisher in New York and New England
- Charles A. Otis (1827–1905), businessman and mayor of Cleveland
- Charles Pomeroy Otis (1840–1888), American educator and author
- Charles Joseph "Honey Boy" Otis (1932 - 2015), New Orleans, Louisiana drummer
