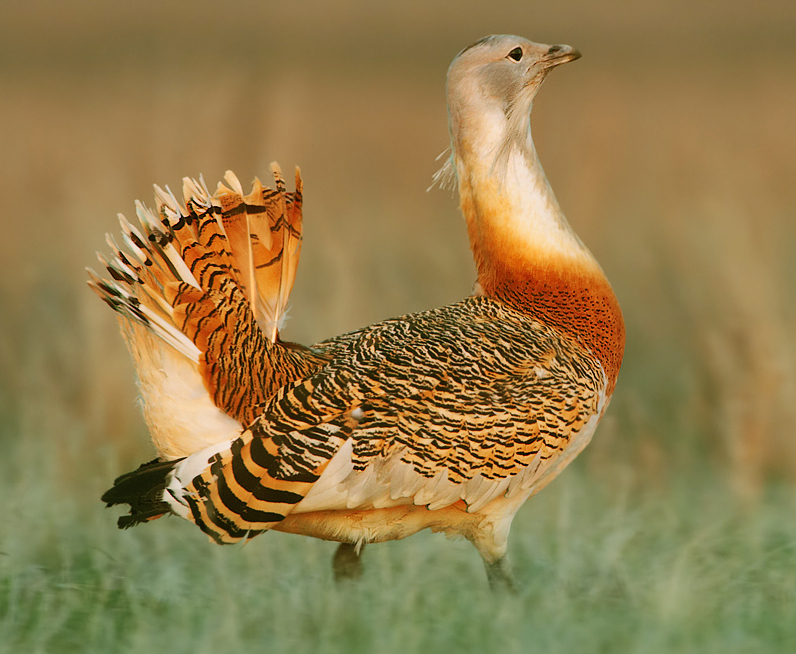
- Great bustard (Otis tarda)

Scientific classification
- Kingdom: Animalia
- Phylum: Chordata
- Class: Aves
- Order: Otidiformes
- Family: Otididae
- Genus: Otis; Linnaeus, 1758

Species
- Otis tarda; †Otis hellenica; †Otis khosatzkii; †Otis paratetrax

= Otis (bird) =

Otis Temporal range: Miocene - Recent

Genus of bustard

Otis is a genus of bustard containing a single living species, the great bustard (Otis tarda).

Several extinct species are known, including the recently described Otis hellenica from the Turolian of Greece. At 19 kg (42 lb), it was larger than its extant relative.

== Taxonomy ==
The genus was introduced in 1758 by the Swedish naturalist Carl Linnaeus in the tenth edition of his Systema Naturae; it came from the Greek name ὠτίς ōtis taken from Natural History by Pliny the Elder published around 77 AD which briefly mentions a bird like it. These names were further mentioned by Pierre Belon in 1555 and Ulisse Aldrovandi in 1600.

Linnaeus placed four species in the genus, but the type species was designated as the great bustard (Otis tarda) by George Robert Gray in 1840.
