= Harrison Gray Otis (politician) =

American politician and attorney (1765–1848)

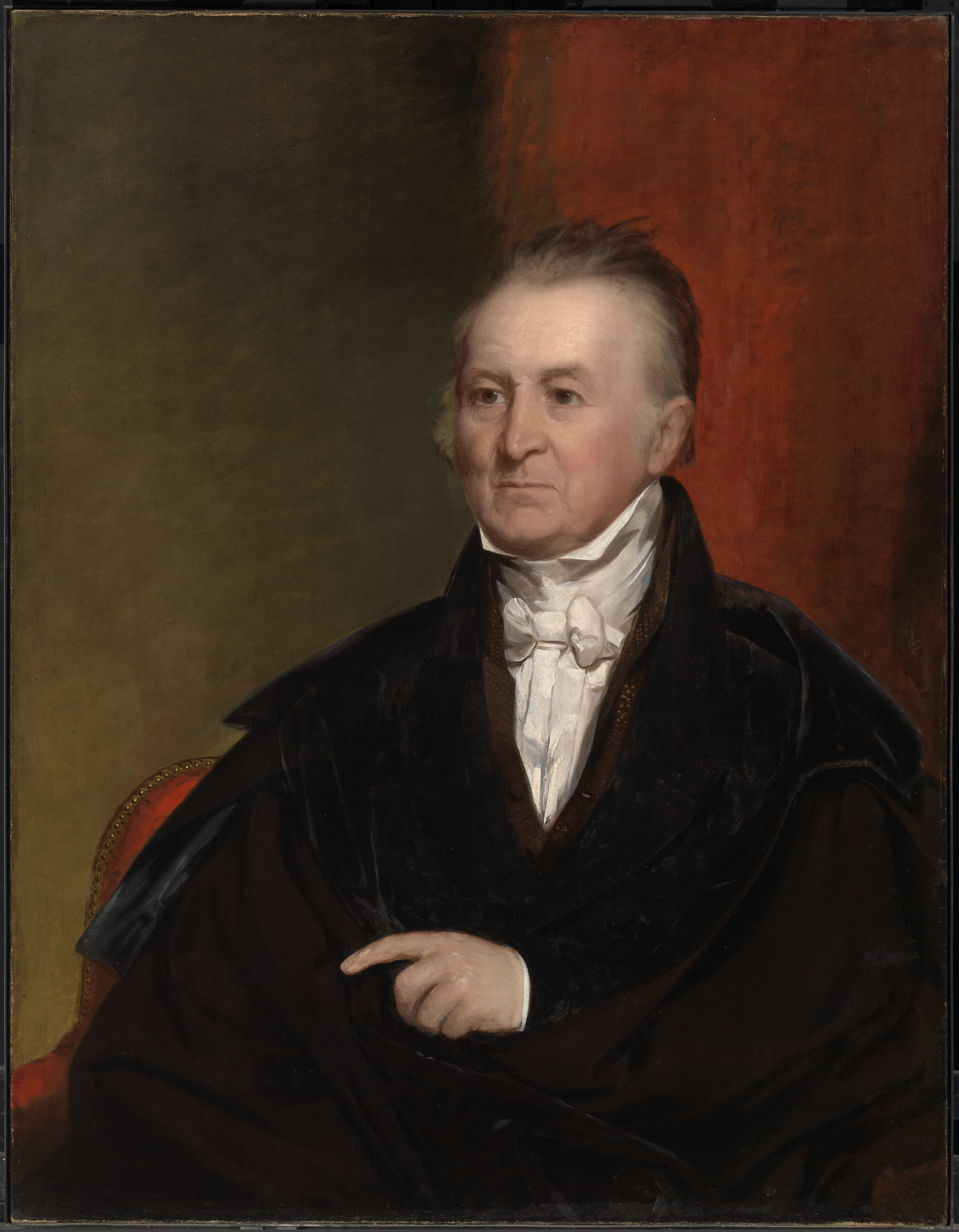
- 1833 portrait by Chester Harding

United States Senator from Massachusetts
- In office March 4, 1817 – May 30, 1822
- Preceded by: Joseph Bradley Varnum
- Succeeded by: James Lloyd

Member of the U.S. House of Representatives from Massachusetts's 8th district
- In office March 4, 1797 – March 3, 1801
- Preceded by: Fisher Ames
- Succeeded by: William Eustis

3rd Mayor of Boston, Massachusetts
- In office January 5, 1829 – January 2, 1832
- Preceded by: Josiah Quincy III
- Succeeded by: Charles Wells

Delegate from Massachusetts to the Hartford Convention
- In office 1814–1815

President of the Massachusetts Senate
- In office 1805 – 1806; 1808–1811

United States Attorney for the District of Massachusetts
- In office 1796–1796
- Preceded by: Christopher Gore
- Succeeded by: John Davis

Personal details
- Born: October 8, 1765 Boston, Massachusetts Bay Colony, British America
- Died: October 28, 1848 (aged 83) Boston, Massachusetts, US
- Party: Federalist
- Spouse: Sally Foster Otis
- Children: 11
- Relatives: Otis family
- Education: Boston Latin School
- Alma mater: Harvard University
- Profession: Law

Harrison Gray Otis (October 8, 1765 – October 28, 1848), was a businessman, lawyer, and politician, becoming one of the most important leaders of the United States' first political party, the Federalists. He was a member of the Otis family.

One of the wealthiest men of Boston, Otis was reportedly worth at least US$800,000 in 1846, equivalent to $24,900,000 in 2024.

== Early life ==
Otis was born in Boston, Massachusetts, on October 8, 1765, to Elizabeth (née Gray) and Samuel Allyne Otis. His uncle was American colonial leader and activist James Otis, and his father was active in early American politics as a member of Massachusetts state house of representatives, delegate to Massachusetts state constitutional convention, and Continental Congress delegate from Massachusetts. His aunt was Mercy Otis Warren, a well-known poet.

Otis himself graduated from Boston Latin School in 1773 and Harvard University in 1783, studied law, and was admitted to the bar in 1786 when he commenced practice in Boston.

== Career ==
Coat of Arms of Harrison Gray Otis

In 1794 he was elected to the Massachusetts legislature, and in 1796 was appointed by President George Washington to be U.S. Attorney for Massachusetts. In 1797, he was elected U.S. Representative from Massachusetts as a Federalist and a strong advocate for centralized government, in which office he served until 1801. He was appointed United States U.S. Attorney for Massachusetts by President John Adams (1801–1802), and again served in the state legislature from 1802 to 1817, serving several terms as President of the state senate (1805–1806, 1808–1811). He was elected a Fellow of the American Academy of Arts and Sciences in 1804. In subsequent years, Otis was elected U.S. Senator from Massachusetts (1817–1822), and then Mayor of Boston (1829–1831).

=== Judicial career ===
In 1814, in the midst of his political career, he was also named a judge of the court of common pleas (1814–1818), and played a leading role as delegate to the controversial Hartford Convention in which New England's secession from the United States was discussed. Overall, it led to the demise of the Federalists, and Otis's political ambitions suffered. Otis subsequently defended the convention in his Letters Developing the Character and Views of the Hartford Convention (1820) and his Letters in Defence of the Hartford Convention (1824).

Otis was involved in a major financial scandal during the site selection for the Massachusetts State House. Boston was determined to remain the state capitol, and appointed Otis to a town committee to purchase land and donate it to the state. He did so, and also quietly arranged his own private purchase of 18.5 acres (75,000 m^{2}) adjoining from the agent of John Singleton Copley, then living in England. After a decade of legal arguments, the sale was upheld, and Otis and the Mount Vernon Proprietors developed a large part of Beacon Hill.

Otis was an overseer of Harvard University from 1810 to 1823, and a fellow of the university from 1823 to 1825, as well as one of the original incorporators of the Boston Bank. In 1812, Otis also became a founding member of the American Antiquarian Society.

== Personal life ==
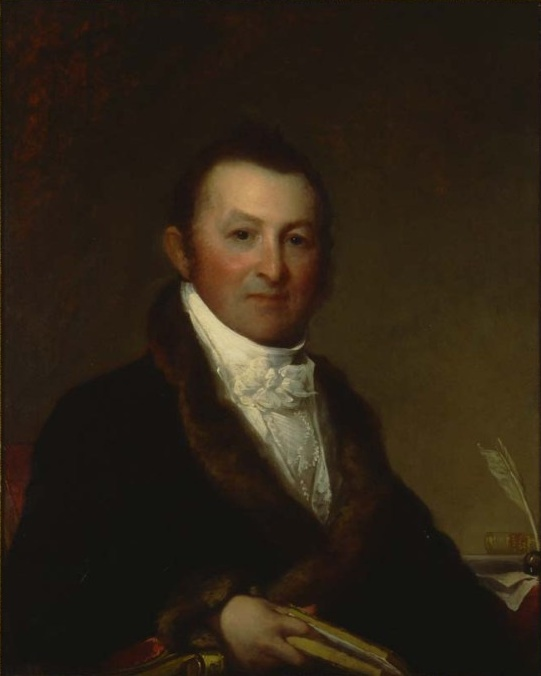
Harrison Gray Otis, 1809 by Gilbert Stuart

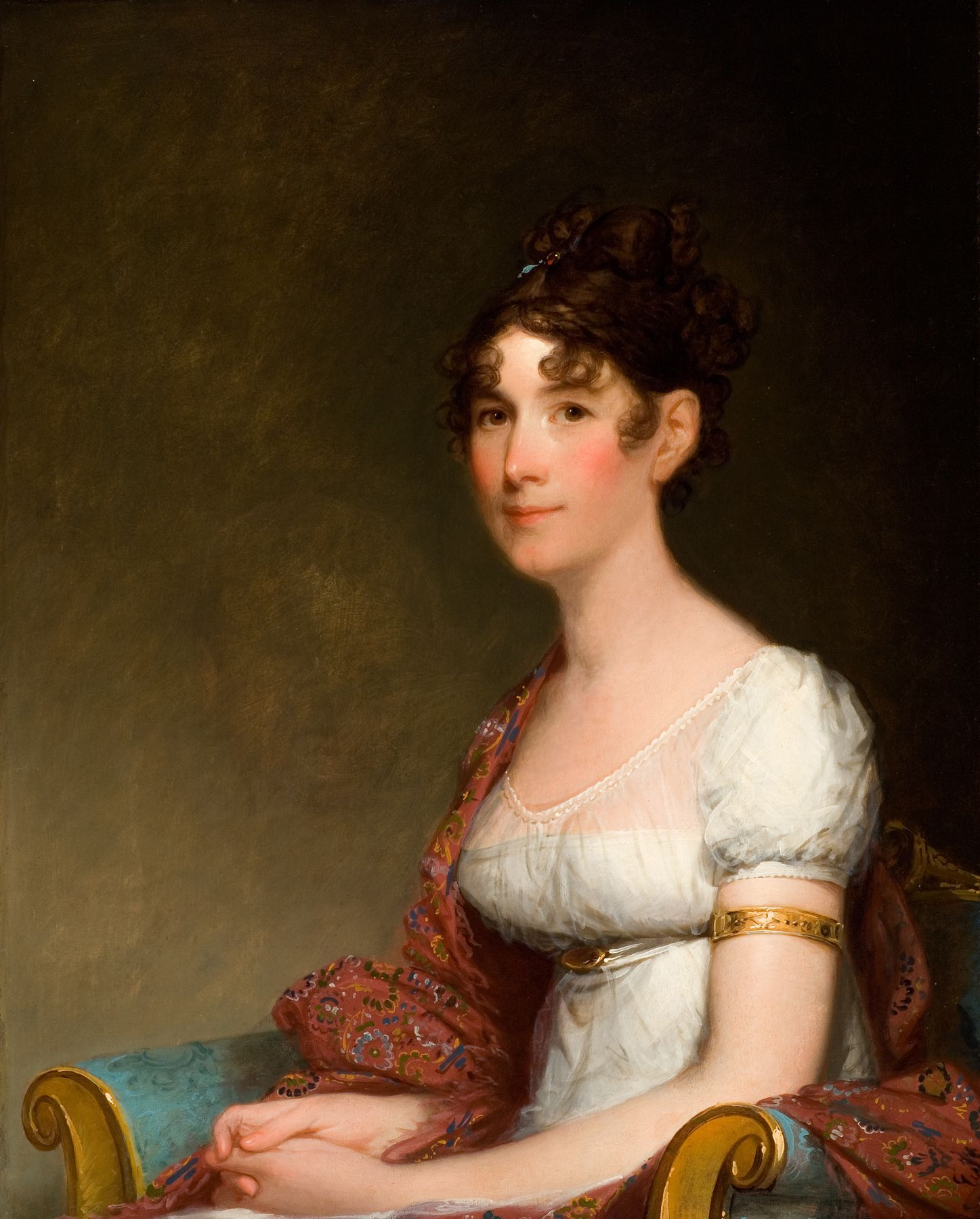
Harrison Gray Otis, 1809 by Gilbert Stuart

On May 31, 1790, Otis married Sally Foster, the daughter of prominent merchant William Foster. During the course of his lifetime, he built not one, but three, grand houses in quick succession (see Harrison Gray Otis House), all designed by noted architect Charles Bulfinch. Together, Harrison and Sally were the parents of eleven children, including:

- Elizabeth Gray Otis (1791–1824), who married George Williams Lyman (1786–1880), a director of the Boston and Lowell Railroad.
- Harrison Gray Otis, Jr. (1792–1827), who married Eliza Henderson Boardman (1796–1873).
- Sally Ann Otis (1793–1819), who married Israel Thorndike, Jr. (1785–1867), son of merchant Israel Thorndike.
- Sophia Harrison Otis (1799–1874), who married Andrew Ritchie Jr. (1782–1862).
- James William Otis (1800–1869), who married Martha C. Church (1807–1888) in 1825.
- William Foster Otis (1801–1858), who married Emily Marshall (1807–1836).

He died in Boston on October 28, 1848, and is buried in Mount Auburn Cemetery, Cambridge, Massachusetts.

=== Descendants ===
Through his son William, he was the grandfather of Emily Marshall Otis (1832–1906), who married historian and educator Samuel Eliot. Through his son James, he was the grandfather of James Otis, a New York State Senator and society leader.

A descendant was J. Wadsworth Ritchie (1861–1924), son of Montgomery Harrison Ritchie, who died in the American Civil War, and the first husband of Cornelia Wadsworth Ritchie Adair.

== Gallery ==
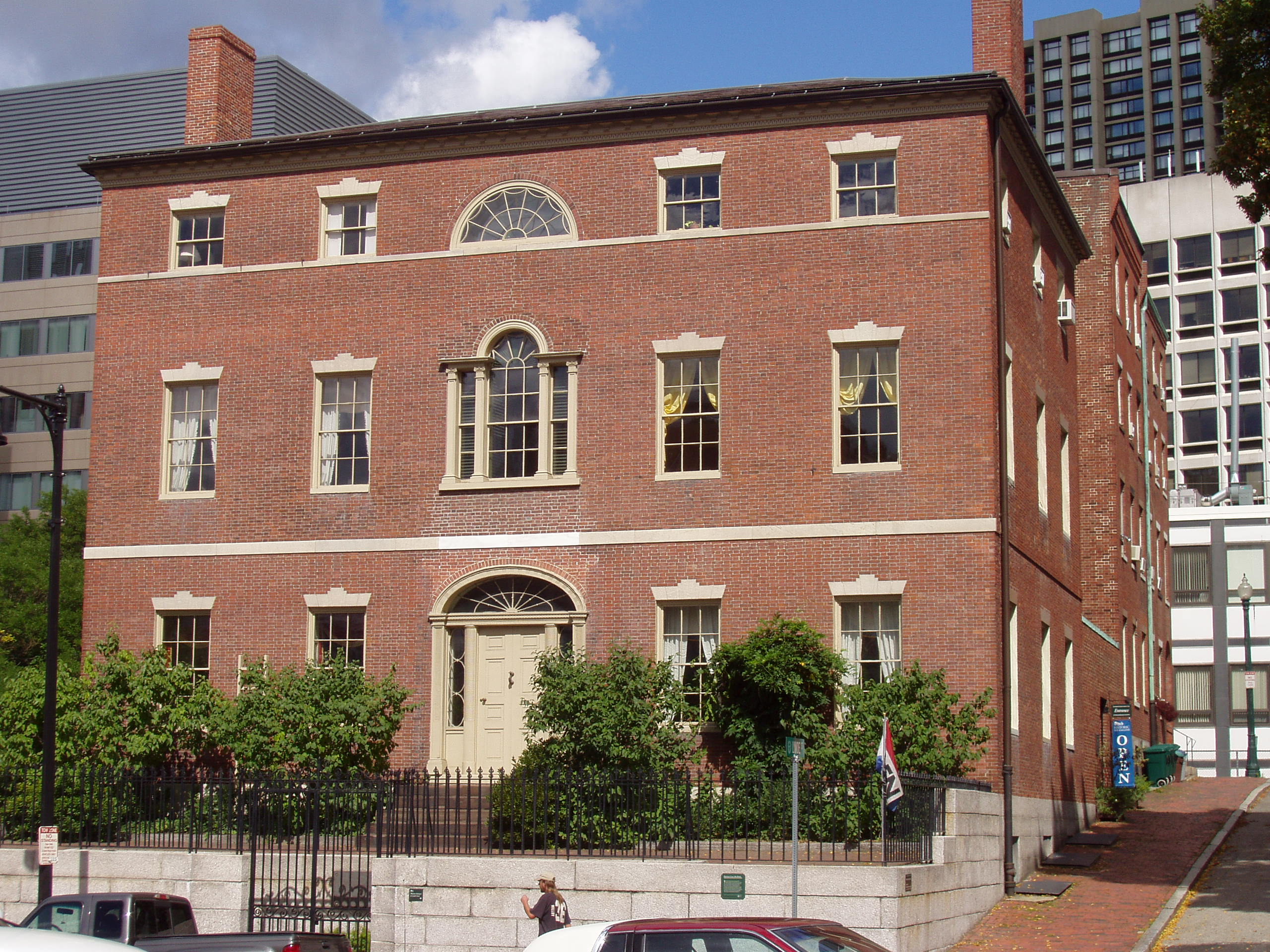
1st Harrison Gray Otis House on Cambridge Street

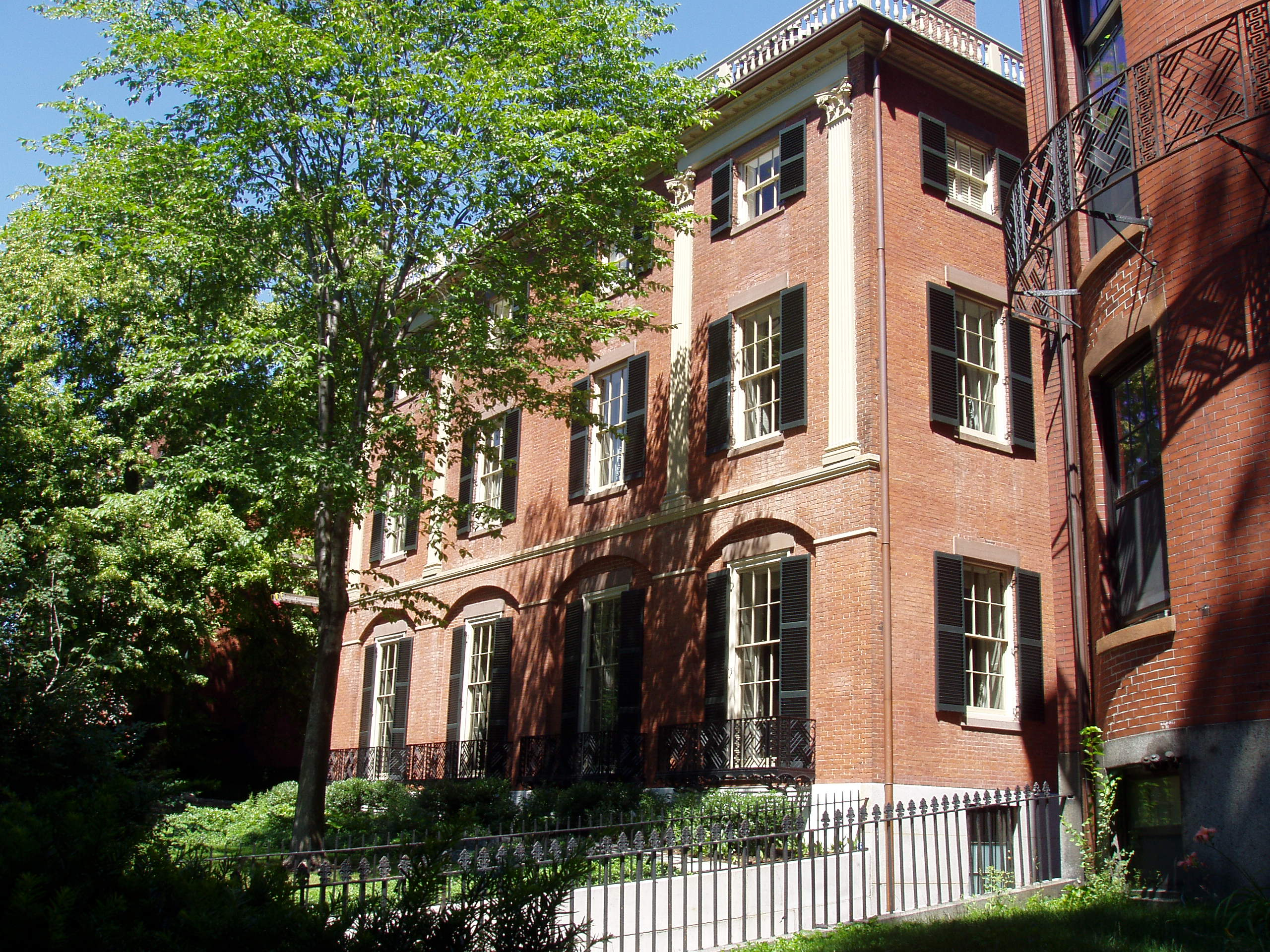
2nd Harrison Gray Otis House, Beacon Hill, Boston, Massachusetts.

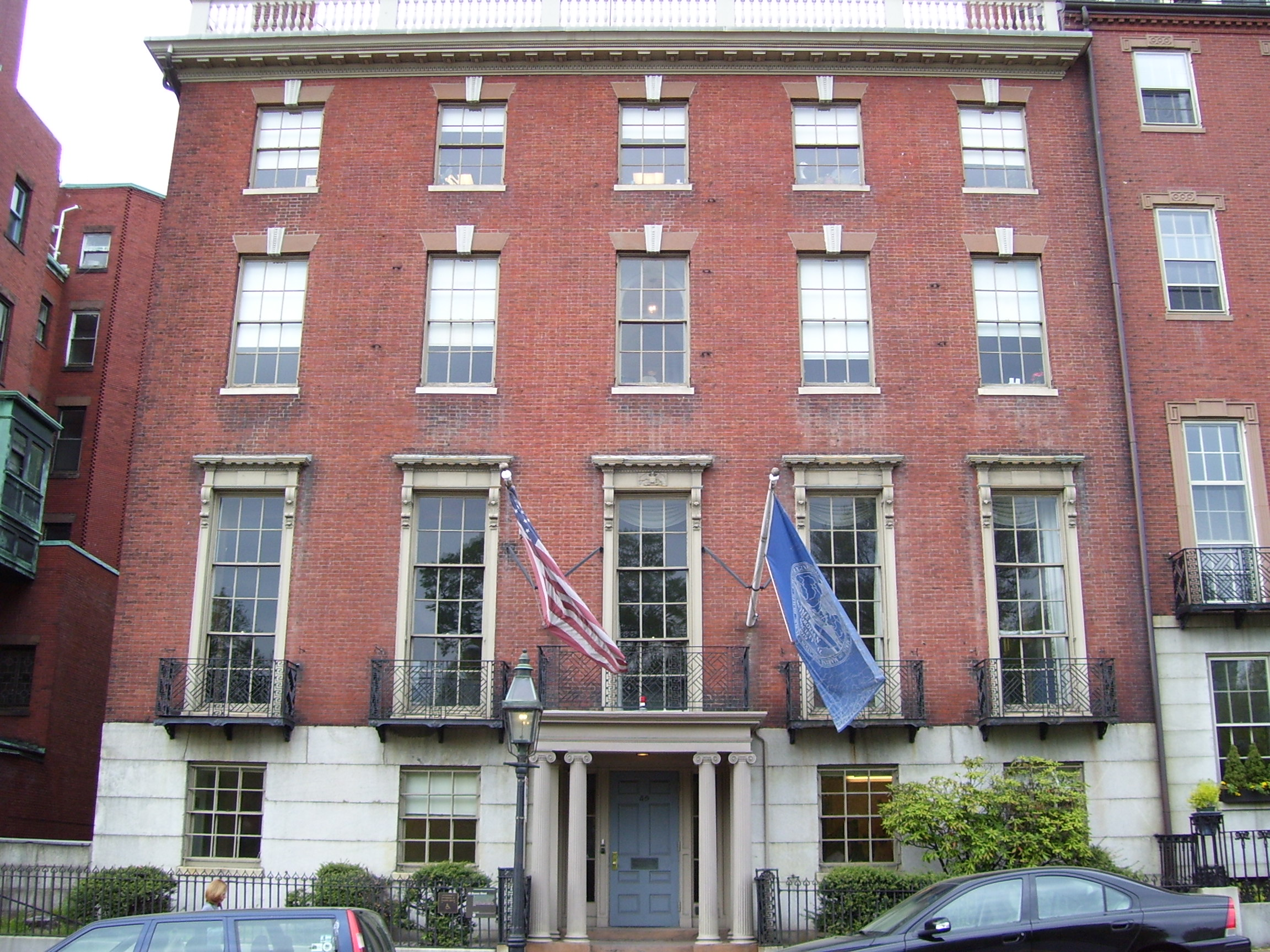
3rd Harrison Gray Otis House on Beacon Street

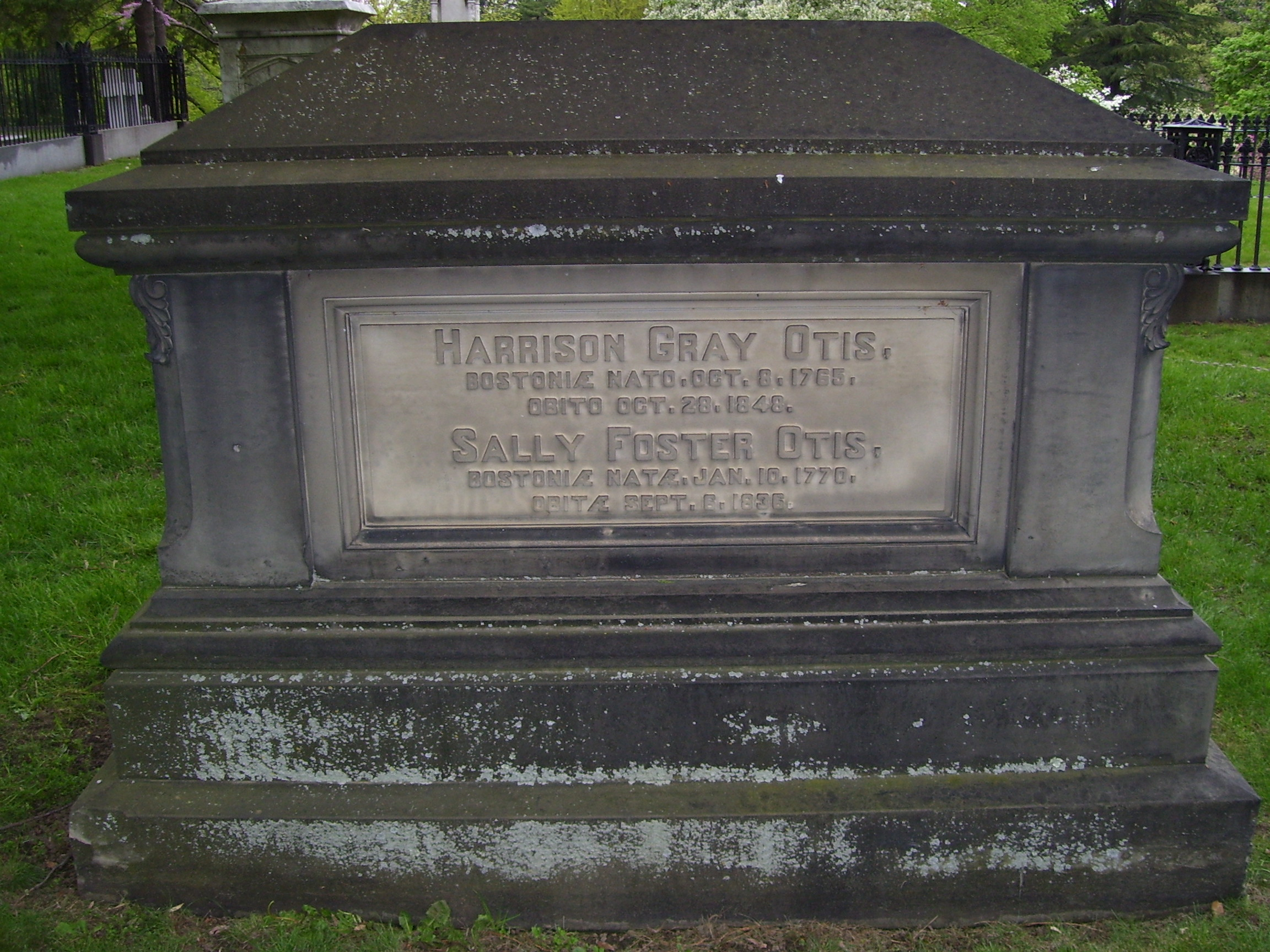
Harrison Gray Otis' grave at Mount Auburn Cemetery

== See also ==
- Harrison Gray Otis House
- Timeline of Boston, 1790s-1830s
- Otis, Iowa
- 1822 Boston mayoral election
- 1828 Boston mayoral election
- 1829 Boston mayoral election
- 1830 Boston mayoral election

Party political offices
Preceded by John Brooks	Federalist nominee for Governor of Massachusetts; 1823	Succeeded by Samuel Lathrop
Political offices
Preceded by Josiah Quincy III	Mayor of Boston, Massachusetts; January 5, 1829 – January 2, 1832	Succeeded by Charles Wells
U.S. Senate
Preceded by Joseph B. Varnum	U.S. senator (Class 2) from Massachusetts; 1817–1822; Served alongside: Eli P. Ashmun, Prentiss Mellen, Elijah H. Mills	Succeeded by James Lloyd
U.S. House of Representatives
Preceded by Fisher Ames	Member of the U.S. House of Representatives from Massachusetts's 8th congressional district March 4, 1797 – March 3, 1801	Succeeded by William Eustis
