= John Lord Otis =

Politician in Massachusetts, US (1827–1894)

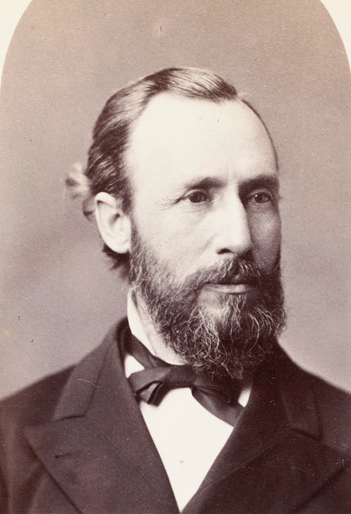
- Born: July 15, 1827; Lyme, Connecticut
- Died: March 14, 1894 (aged 66); Tarpon Springs, Florida
- Burial place: Spring Grove Cemetery in Florence, Massachusetts
- Military career
- Allegiance: Union
- Branch: Union Army
- Rank: Colonel (1863); Bvt. Brigadier General (1865)
- Conflicts: American Civil War
- Other work: Massachusetts state senator and state representative

John Lord Otis (July 15, 1827 – March 14, 1894) was an American politician who served as a brevet brigadier general in the Union Army during the period of the American Civil War.

Otis began working in a cotton factory at the age of 8 where he gained knowledge of mechanical engineering. On March 1, 1847, he married Catherine Preston (1818-1901) with whom he had two sons. In 1851, he took control of the Pacific Mills of Manchester, Connecticut, and later established the Otis Manufacturing Company. After the war, Otis ran the Florence Sewing Machine Company and helped establish the Northampton Emery Wheel Company. He was elected state representative in 1877 and state senator in 1879 and 1880.

In his last years, Otis was in ill health and would spend winters in the South. In January 1894, he had a heart attack. He attempted to return to New England, but he died when he reached Tarpon Springs on March 14, 1894.

Otis was wounded once at the 1862 Battle of New Bern and twice at the Battle of Kinston. He fought with General Ambrose Burnside in North Carolina and General John Gray Foster in South Carolina. In 1864, he joined the Army of the James. Otis had been promoted to the rank of colonel in February 1863. At the end of the war, he was named a brevet brigadier general with a promotion date of March 13, 1865.

== See also ==
- List of American Civil War brevet generals (Union)
