= Links Club =

Private club in New York City

Coordinates: 40°45′54.5″N 73°58′10.5″W

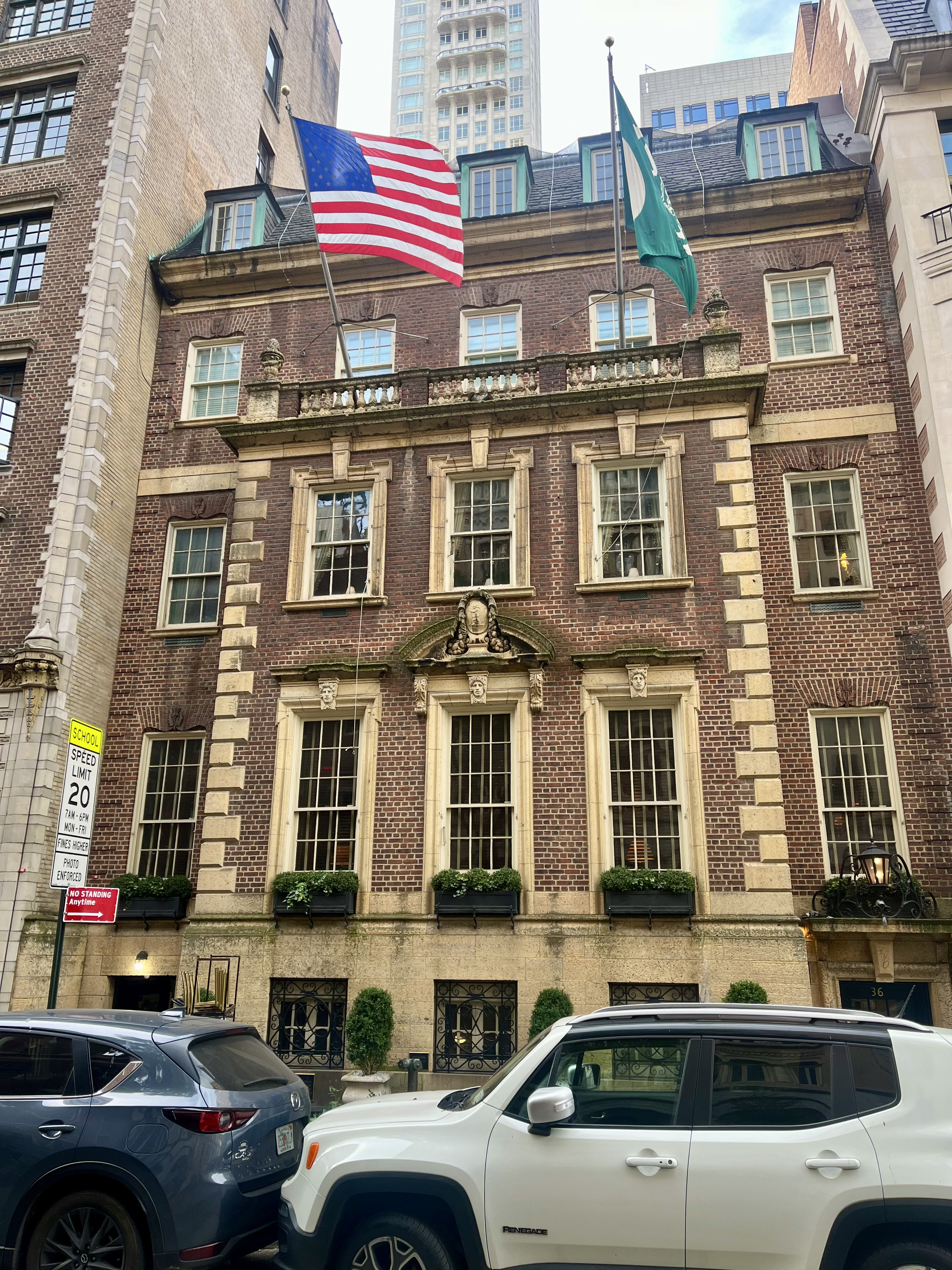
Links Club in November 2023

The Links is a private club in New York City. It is located at 36 East 62nd Street on the Upper East Side of Manhattan in New York City. Charles B. Macdonald, a golf champion and founder of the United States Golf Association, started the Links in 1917 as a place where powerful members of the golf world could keep the true spirit of the game alive.

The club has status under 501(c)(7) Social and Recreation Clubs; in 2024 it claimed $6,297,303 in total revenue and total assets of $7,769,211.

== History ==
The club was established in 1916–1917 by Charles B. Macdonald, in a building designed in the Georgian Revival architectural style by Cross & Cross. In the 1960s, it was "a preferred social gathering spot for America's most powerful chief executives." By 2010, it was still a "preserve of the old banking elite", but not all members were WASPs.

== Notable members in 1955 ==
A sampling of members in 1955 is listed below:

=== Government and diplomacy ===
- Dwight D. Eisenhower, President of the United States
- Winthrop W. Aldrich, ambassador to Great Britain
- Arthur A. Ballantine, Undersecretary of the Treasury and lawyer
- Prescott S. Bush, U.S. Senator and father of President Bush (41)
- Charles E. Daniel, U.S. Senator from South Carolina
- Thomas E. Dewey, governor of New York
- C. Douglas Dillon, U.S. ambassador to France, Future Secretary of the Treasury
- Joseph E. Davies, U.S. ambassador to the Soviet Union
- Thomas S. Gates, Jr., future U.S. Secretary of Defense
- Walter S. Gifford, former chairman of A T & T, former Ambassador to the U.K.
- Stanton Griffis, U.S. ambassador to Poland, Egypt, Spain and Argentina
- Amory Houghton, CEO, Corning Glass Works, future U.S. Congressman
- George M. Humphrey, Secretary of the Treasury
- Herbert C. Hoover Jr., son of the 31st President, Undersecretary of State and a member of the President's cabinet
- John A. McCone, future director of the C.I.A.
- Jean Monnet, diplomat and founding father of the European Union
- Winthrop Rockefeller, son of John D. Rockefeller and Governor of Arkansas
- Sir William Wiseman, British intelligence agent and banker
- Cyrus R. Vance, future U.S. Secretary of State
- John Hay Whitney, future U.S. Ambassador to Great Britain

=== Military ===
- Oscar C. Badger, a four-star admiral in the U.S. Navy
- Ralph A. Bard, undersecretary of the U.S. Navy
- Dunbar W. Bostwick, lt. colonel, U.S. Army, helped organize Normandy invasion
- Lucius D. Clay, U.S. general, Eisenhower deputy and "father" of the Berlin airlift
- Robert A. Lovett, former U.S. Secretary of Defense
- Paul Nitze, future Secretary of the Navy
- Elwood R. Quesada, lieutenant general, U.S.A.F.
- Stanley R. Resor, future U.S. Secretary of the Army
- Kenneth Royall, Army brigadier general, last person to serve as Secretary of War
- James Hopkins Smith Jr., U.S. Secretary of the Navy
- William Bedell Smith, Eisenhower's chief of staff in WWII, four-star general, former U.S. ambassador to the Soviet Union and former C.I.A director
- Harold E. Talbott, Secretary of the Air Force
- James H. Doolittle, U.S. general and famed aviator

=== Industry ===
- Sewell L. Avery, chairman of Montgomery Ward
- Stephen D. Bechtel of the engineering and construction company
- Sosthenes Behn, founder of ITT Corporation
- Roger M. Blough, president of U.S. Steel Corporation
- Harold Boeschenstein, chairman of Owens-Corning
- Richard L. Bowditch, chairman U.S. Chamber of Commerce
- H.S.M. Burns, British president of Shell Oil Company
- Louis S. Cates, Chairman of Phelps Dodge
- Owen R. Cheatham, chairman of Georgia Pacific Corporation
- Colby M. Chester, chairman of General Foods Corporation
- Hugh J. Chisholm, president of International Paper
- George H. Coppers, chairman of Nabisco
- Cleo F. Craig, president of AT&T
- Walter F. Dillingham, “the Baron of Hawaiian Industry”
- Richard R. Depree, president of Procter & Gamble
- Benjamin F. Fairless, CEO of U.S. Steel
- Henry Ford II, president of the Ford Motor Company
- J. Peter Grace Jr., Grace Chemical CEO
- Augustus C. Long, CEO of Texaco
- Henry R. Luce, publisher of Time Magazine
- Joseph H. McConnell, former president of NBC
- George W. Merck, president of Merck pharmaceuticals
- Roger Milliken, CEO of Milliken textiles
- Morehead Patterson, chairman of AMF
- G. Willing Pepper, president of the Scott Paper Company
- Gwilym A. Price, president of Westinghouse
- Edgar Monsanto Queeny, chairman of Monsanto Corporation
- Donald J. Russell, future CEO of Southern Pacific Railroad
- Sidney A. Swensrud, chairman Gulf Oil
- Walter C. Teagle, retired chairman of Standard Oil
- Thomas J. Watson Jr., president of IBM
- Charles E. Wilson, former president of General Electric

=== Finance ===
- Norborne Berkeley, president of Chemical Bank
- Edward Eagle Brown, chairman of the First National Bank of Chicago
- Paul C. Cabot, founded State Street Corporation and started the first mutual fund
- Asa V. Call, president of Pacific Mutual Life Insurance Company
- Jean Cattier, Partner at White Weld & Co, and Chairman of the European American Bank
- George Champion, chairman, Chase Manhattan Bank
- J. Luther Cleveland, chairman of the Guaranty Trust Company
- S. Sloan Colt, president of the Bankers Trust Company
- Isaac B. Grainger, president of Chemical Bank and future president U.S.G.A.
- Benjamin H. Griswold III, chairman of Alex, Brown
- E. Roland Harriman, co-founder of Brown Brothers Harriman
- Devereux C. Josephs, chairman of the Board New York Life Insurance
- John J. McCloy, future chairman, Chase Manhattan Bank, President World Bank
- Henry S. Morgan, grandson of J.P. Morgan and co-founder of Morgan Stanley
- Ralph Owen, chairman of American Express
- Elmore C. Patterson, future CEO of J.P. Morgan
- Ralph T. Reed, future CEO of American Express
- David Rockefeller, future chairman of the Chase Manhattan Bank
- J. Stillman Rockefeller, president National City Bank
- Howard C. Sheperd, chairman of National City Bank
- Harold Stanley, co-founder of Morgan Stanley
- Dean Witter, founder of Dean Witter investment firm

=== Aircraft and aviation ===
- William E. Boeing, founder of the Boeing Airplane Company
- F. Trubee Davison, WWI Naval Aviator
- Robert E. Gross, president of Lockheed Aircraft
- Frederick B. Rentschler, chairman of Pratt & Whitney Aircraft
- Edward V. Rickenbacker, World War I ace pilot
- Leon A. Swirbul, founder of Grumman Aircraft

=== Inheritance ===
- Marshall Field, heir to the department store fortune
- James H. McGraw Jr., heir to the book publishing company
- Paul Mellon, heir to the Mellon banking fortune and philanthropist
- Howard Phipps, heir to the Carnegie Steel partner Henry Phipps Jr.
- Joseph N. Pew, heir to Sun Oil fortune, co-founder of the Pew Charitable Trusts
- J. Watson Webb, film maker and heir to the Vanderbilt fortune

=== Golf and other pursuits ===
- Morton G. Bogue, former president of the U.S.G.A.
- C. Suydam Cutting, explorer
- Donald K. David, dean of the Harvard Business School
- Arthur H. Dean, chairman of the law firm Sullivan & Cromwell
- Childs Frick, paleontologist and son of Steel magnate Henry Clay Frick
- Totton P. Heffelfinger, president of the U.S.G.A.
- Eugene V. Homans. Bobby Jones defeated Homans at Merion to win the grand slam in 1930
- Roger D. Lapham, Mayor of San Francisco and co-founder of Cypress Point Club
- Robert Montgomery, actor
- Alfred Easton Poor, architect
- Roland L. Redmond, president Metropolitan Museum of Art
- Archie M. Reid, secretary of the U.S.G.A.
- Clifford Roberts, co-founder of Augusta National Golf Club

=== Other ===
- Jack C. Massey

=== 1955 members featured on the cover of Time Magazine ===
- Charles Wilson
- Colby Chester
- Cyrus Vance
- David Rockefeller
- Dwight Eisenhower
- Douglas Dillon
- Eddie Rickenbacker
- George Merck
- Gwilym Price
- Henry Ford II
- Herbert Hoover Jr.
- James Doolittle
- John McCloy
- Joseph Davies
- Joseph Pew
- Lucius Clay
- Roger Blough
- Roger Lapham
- Stillman Rockefeller
- Thomas Dewey
- Thomas Watson
- Trubee Davison
- Walter Teagle
- Winthrop Rockefeller

== Other References ==
- List of traditional gentlemen's clubs in the United States
- Article on the clubhouse and its architecture.
