= Sidney Swensrud =

American oilman (1900–1996)

- Born: August 1, 1900; Northwood, Iowa
- Died: May 29, 1996 (aged 95); Naples, Florida
- Education: University of Minnesota (BSc '23); Harvard University (MBA '27)
- Spouse: Isabelle Althea Miller (m. 1929)

Sidney Anton Swensrud (August 1, 1900 – May 29, 1996) was an American oilman who served from 1948 to 1953 as president and from 1953 to 1957 as chairman of Gulf Oil. Swensrud began his career in 1928 with the Standard Oil Company (Ohio). He remained with Standard until 1947, when he was recruited by Gulf as an executive vice-president. In 1948, Swensrud was appointed president of Gulf. He served as president until 1953, when he became chairman of the board, and retired in 1957. Swensrud died in 1996 at age 95.

== Biography ==
Sidney Anton Swensrud was born on August 1, 1900 in Northwood, Iowa, to Edward Ellingson Swensrud (1861–1940) and Agnes Violet Buchanan (1863–1905). Edward's father, Elling Ellingson Svensrud (1833–1908), had immigrated to Iowa from Buskerud, Norway. Sidney's Scottish mother, Agnes, died in 1905, and in 1910 Edward remarried to Belle Breiseth (1874–1962), who was born in Norway.

Swensrud entered the University of Minnesota in 1919 and graduated bachelor of science in 1923. In 1925 he enrolled at the Harvard Business School, where he graduated master of business administration in 1927. Swensrud began his career in 1928 with the Standard Oil Company (Ohio) as an assistant to president Wallace Trevor Holliday. In 1939, Swensrud was appointed an vice-president, in 1940 was elected a director, and in 1946 was appointed an executive vice-president. His appointment followed the division of Standard's production, supply, and transportation units into separate departments, over which Swensrud would have general charge.

In May 1947, the Gulf Oil Corporation recruited Swensrud from Standard to become an executive-vice president. In May 1948, Gulf chairman William Larimer Mellon Sr. retired. Upon the retirement, president James Frank Drake succeeded Mellon as chairman, and Swensrud was promoted to president of the company. On April 28, 1953, Swensrud was elected chairman of the board, succeeding Drake. Swensrud was succeeded as president by William Kepler Whiteford Jr. In December of that year, Douglas McKay appointed Swensrud a member of the National Petroleum Council. In December 1954, Swensrud was named deputy chairman of the Federal Reserve Bank of Cleveland. In March 1957, Swensrud announced his intention to retire as chairman on April 23. After his retirement from Gulf, Swensrud was reelected to the board of the Standard Oil Company (Ohio).

Swensrud was a member of the Laurel Valley Golf Club, Hole-in-the-Wall Golf Club, Duquesne Club, Fox Chapel Golf Club, Harvard Club, Pittsburgh Golf Club, Rolling Rock Club, Links Club, Pepper Pike Club, and the Union Club of Cleveland. He served as a director of the Committee for a National Trade Policy and the Pittsburgh Symphony Society; was a member of the board of trustees of the Carnegie Institute of Technology, and was a member of the Council on Foreign Relations and the American Institute of Mining and Metallurgical Engineers. In 1955, he became chairman of the Public Auditorium Authority, which oversaw planning and construction of the Civic Auditorium. In his retirement, Swensrud supported the cause of population control and was a member of the Commerce and Industry Committee of Planned Parenthood. He served also as chairman for the Western Hemisphere section of the International Planned Parenthood Federation. In the late 1970s he was a member of the Federation for American Immigration Reform.

On May 10, 1929, Swensrud married Isabelle Althea Miller (1906–1999). They had two children: Lois (1931–2013) and Stephen (1933–2011). During his time with Gulf, the Swensruds lived at 918 West Waldheim Road in Fox Chapel. Swensrud died in Naples, Florida on May 29, 1996 at age 95.

== Works ==
- Swensrud, Sidney A. "Factors affecting the demand for gasoline and crude oil," Transactions of the Association of Industrial and Mechanical Engineers, 1933.
- Swensrud, Sidney A. "Possibility of converting the large-diameter war emergency pipe lines to natural gas service after the War." Petroleum Technology, (vol. 7 no. 4, July 1944), 1-2.
- Swensrud, Sidney A. Gulf Oil: The First Fifty Years, 1901–1951. Newcomen Society in North America, 1951.
