= Abdulhadi H. Taher =

Saudi Arabian oil executive (1930–2013)

- Born: 1930
- Died: 2013 (aged 82–83)
- Education: Haas School of Business (Ph.D, 1964)
- Occupations: Oil executive, author, and philanthropist
- Known for: Director General of the Saudi Arabian Ministry of Petroleum and Minerals
- Children: Tarek Taher

Abdulhadi H. Taher (1930 – 2013) was a Saudi Arabian oil executive and author. He was the Director General of the Saudi Arabian Ministry of Petroleum and Minerals Taher was described as "one of the most powerful figures" in Saudi Arabia.

== Early life and education ==
Taher was born in Medina in 1930 to a family of limited means. He earned his PhD in Business Administration from what is now the Haas School of Business at the University of California, Berkeley in 1964. Taher died in 2013.

== Career ==
Taher was described as "one of the most powerful figures" in Saudi Arabia. He spent his career working in both the public and private sectors. He served as the Director General of the Saudi Arabian Ministry of Petroleum and Minerals, the government-owned corporation that develops the Mideast nation's petroleum, petrochemical and mineral industries. He was also the founder of the Al-Taher Group, a collection of companies that focus on construction, engineering, trading and real estate ventures in Saudi Arabia. The Al-Taher Group employs a workforce of more than 2500 employees based throughout the Arab region. Taher served as a board member of Saudi Aramco and as the governor and founding director general of the Petromin Corporation.

Taher was a major shareholder in Gulf Oil the multinational oil company, alongside the Hinduja group.

Taher lectured at the business school at King Saud University in Riyadh.

Taher was a Knight of Thailand. He was ennobled by King Bhumibol Adulyadej in 1980.

== Published works ==
Taher has authored or co-authored four books.

=== Monographs ===
- (2013). Energy, A Global Outlook: The Case for Effective International Co-operation. Oxford: Pergamon Press.
- (2011). Petroleum, Gas and Development Strategies of Saudi Arabia: Income Determination in the International Petroleum Industry. London: Saqi Books.
- (2008). Income Determination in the International Petroleum Industry. London: Saqi Books.

=== Co-authored monographs ===
- (2013). Co-authored with Michael Matthews. Saudi Arabian Hydrocarbons and World Affairs. London: Saqi Books.
