= Gulf Oil =

American oil company

Gulf Oil Corporation

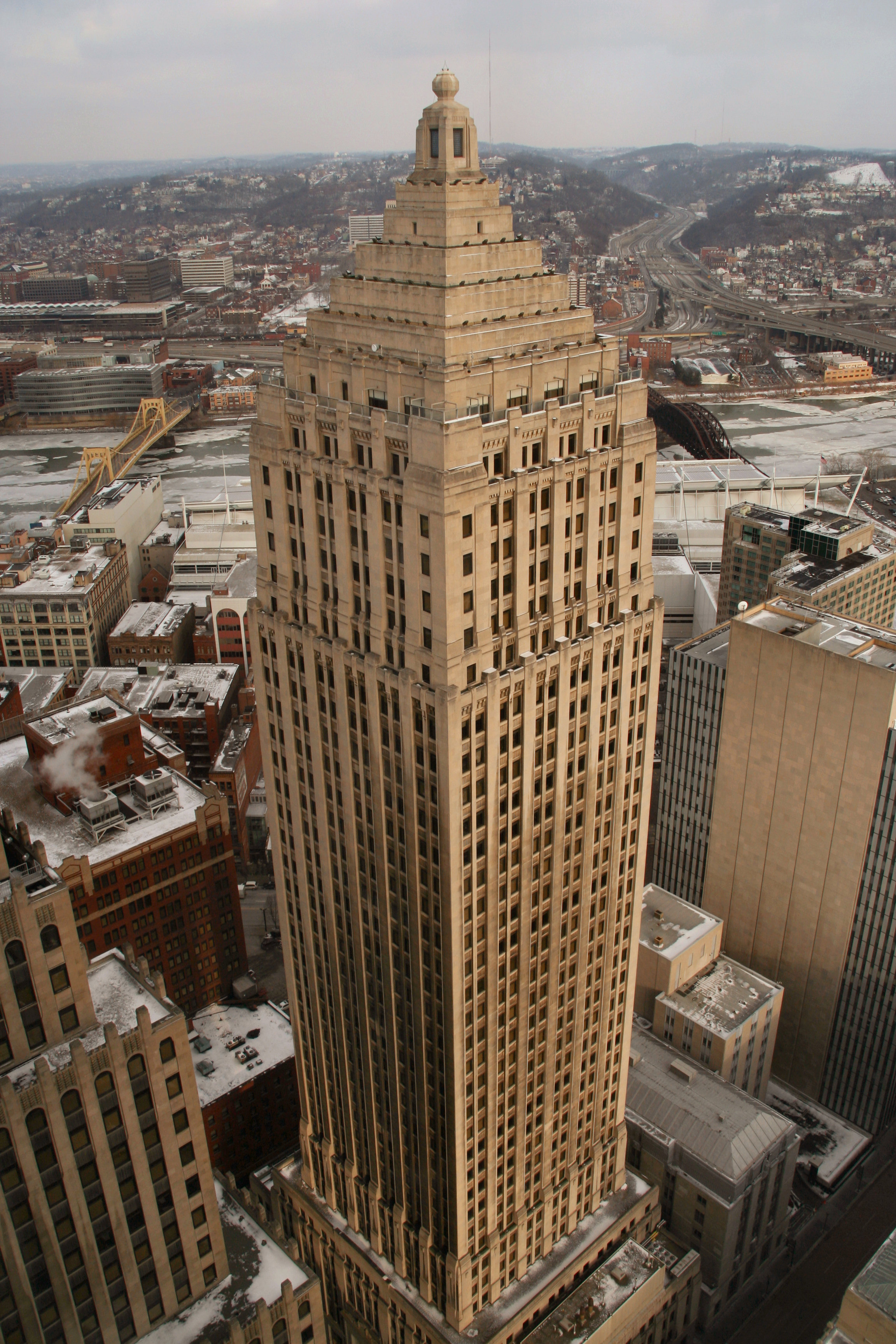
- Gulf Tower in Pittsburgh, Pennsylvania, Gulf Oil's former headquarters
- Type: Public
- Traded as: NYSE: GO (1922–1985)
- Industry: Petroleum industry
- Founded: January 30, 1907
- Defunct: March 15, 1985; 41 years ago (Note: The company had been acquired in 1984, but the takeover was completed in 1985.)
- Fate: Company acquired by Standard Oil of California
- Successor: Chevron
- Headquarters: Gulf Tower, Pittsburgh, Pennsylvania, U.S.
- Products: Fuels; Lubricants; Greases
- Brands: Gulf

Gulf Oil Corporation was a major American global oil company that was in business from 1901 to 1985. The eighth-largest American manufacturing company in 1941 and the ninth largest in 1979, Gulf Oil was one of the Seven Sisters oil companies. Prior to its merger with Standard Oil of California, Gulf was one of the chief instruments of the Mellon family fortune; both Gulf and Mellon Financial had their headquarters in Pittsburgh, Pennsylvania, with Gulf's headquarters, the Gulf Tower, being Pittsburgh's tallest building until the completion of the U.S. Steel Tower.

Gulf Oil Corporation (GOC) ceased to exist as an independent company in 1985, when it merged with Standard Oil of California (SOCAL), with both rebranding as Chevron in the United States. Gulf Canada, Gulf's main Canadian subsidiary, was sold the same year with retail outlets to Ultramar and Petro-Canada and what became Gulf Canada Resources to Olympia & York.

Other aspects of the Gulf brand name, and a number of the constituent business divisions of GOC, have continued to exist. In its present incarnation, it is a "new economy" business, employing very few people directly and its assets mainly in the form of intellectual property: brands, product specifications and scientific expertise. The rights to the brand in the United States are owned by Gulf Oil Limited Partnership (GOLC), which operates service stations and petroleum terminals; it is headquartered in Wellesley, Massachusetts. The corporate vehicle at the center of the Gulf network outside the United States, excluding Spain and Portugal, is Gulf Oil International, a company owned by the Hinduja Group. That company's focus is primarily in the provision of downstream products and services to a mass market through joint ventures, strategic alliances, licensing agreements, and distribution arrangements. In Spain and Portugal, the Gulf brand is owned by TotalEnergies SE.

== History ==
=== 1901–1982 ===
The business that became Gulf Oil started in 1901 with the discovery of oil at Spindletop oilfield near Beaumont, Texas. A group of investors came together to promote the development of a modern refinery at nearby Port Arthur to process the oil. The largest investors were Andrew Mellon and William Larimer Mellon Sr., of the Pittsburgh Mellon family. Other investors included many of Mellon's Pennsylvania clients as well as some Texas wildcatters. Mellon Bank and Gulf Oil remained closely associated thereafter. The Gulf Oil Corporation itself was formed in 1907 through the amalgamation of a number of oil businesses, principally the J.M. Guffey Petroleum Company, Gulf Pipeline Company, and Gulf Refining companies of Texas. The name of the company refers to the Gulf of Mexico where Beaumont lies.

Early Gulf logo c. 1920

Output from Spindletop peaked at around 100,000 barrels per day (16,000 m^{3}/d) just after it was discovered and then started to decline. Later discoveries made 1927 the peak year of Spindletop production, but Spindletop's early decline forced Gulf to seek alternative sources of supply to sustain its substantial investment in refining capacity. This was achieved by constructing the 400-mile (640 km) Glenn Pool pipeline connecting oilfields in Oklahoma with Gulf's refinery at Port Arthur. (Note: Work on the $5 million, 415 mile 8-inch line began February 13, 1907 and lasted till August 13, 1907. The pipe line was the first to connect Oklahoma oil field to the Gulf coast.) The pipeline opened in September 1907. Gulf later built a network of pipelines and refineries in the eastern and southern United States, requiring heavy capital investment. Thus, Gulf Oil provided Mellon Bank with a secure vehicle for investing in the oil sector.

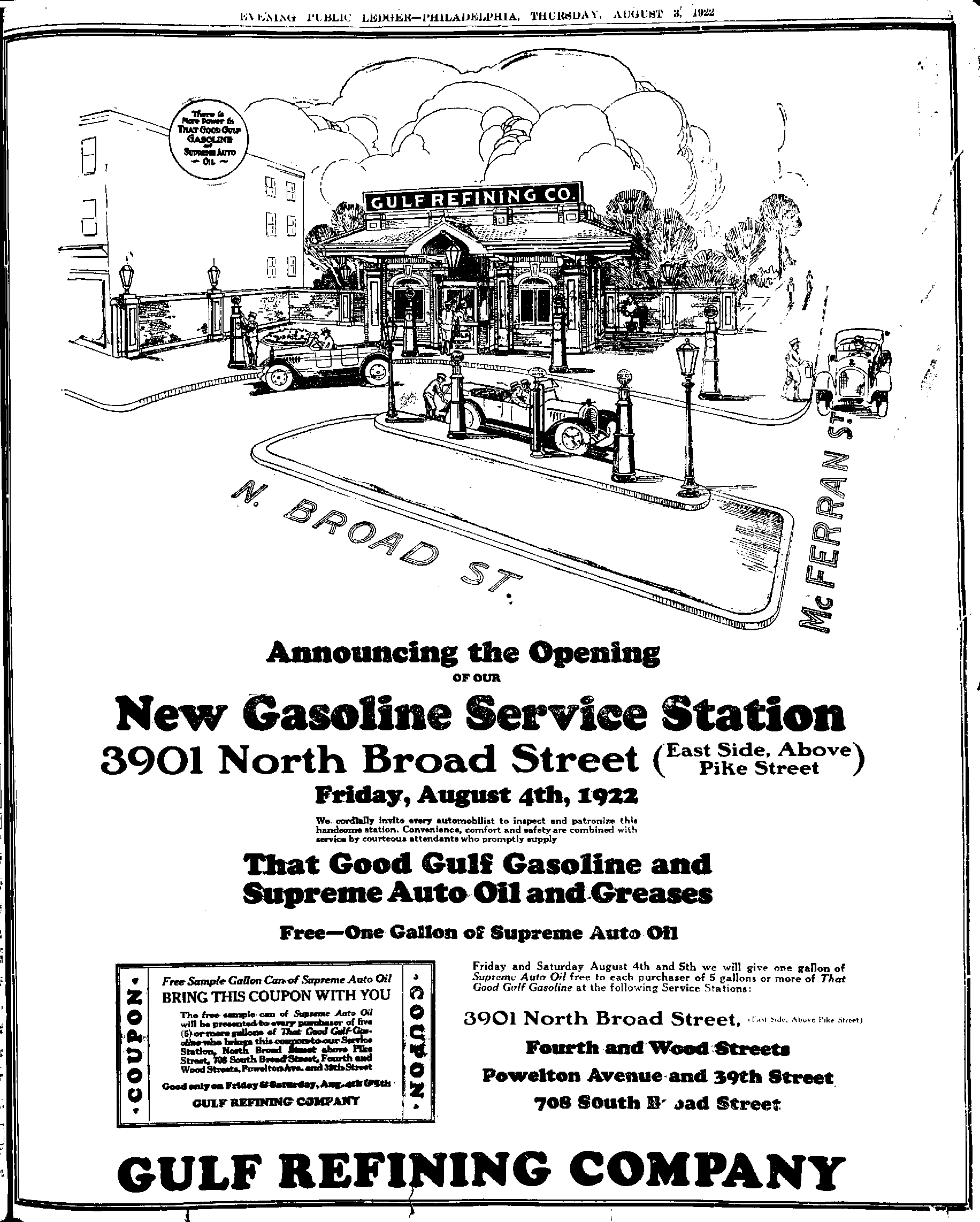
1922 newspaper ad for a new Gulf station in Philadelphia

Gulf promoted the concept of branded product sales by selling fuel in containers and from pumps marked with a distinctive orange disc logo. A customer buying Gulf-branded fuel could be assured of its quality and consistent standard. (In the early 20th century, non-branded fuel in the United States was often contaminated or of unreliable quality).

Gulf Oil grew steadily in the inter-war years, with its activities mainly confined to the United States. The company was characterized by its vertically integrated business activities and was active across the whole spectrum of the oil industry: exploration, production, transport, refining and marketing. It also involved itself in associated industries such as petrochemicals and automobile component manufacturing. It introduced significant commercial and technical innovations, including the first drive-in service station (1913), complimentary road maps, drilling over water at Ferry Lake, and the catalytic cracking refining process (Gulf installed the world's first commercial catalytic cracking unit at its Port Arthur, Texas refinery complex in 1951). Gulf also established the model for the integrated, international "oil major", which refers to one of a group of very large companies that assumed influential and sensitive positions in the countries in which they operated. In 1924, it acquired the Venezuelan-American Creole Syndicate's leases in the strip of shallow water 1.5 kilometers (0.93 mi) wide along the Lake Maracaibo east shore.

In Colombia, Gulf purchased the Barco oil concession in 1926. The government of Colombia revoked the concession the same year, but after much negotiation Gulf won it back in 1931. However, during a period of over-capacity, Gulf was more interested in holding the reserve than developing it. In 1936 Gulf sold Barco to the Texas Corporation, now Texaco, and they would eventually all merge as Chevron.

Gulf had extensive exploration and production operations in the Gulf of Mexico, Canada, and Kuwait. The company played a major role in the early development of oil production in Kuwait, and through the 1950s and '60s apparently enjoyed a "special relationship" with the Kuwaiti government. This special relationship attracted unfavorable attention since it was associated with "political contributions" (see below) and support for anti-democratic politics, as evidenced by papers taken from the body of a Gulf executive killed in the crash of a TWA aircraft at Cairo in 1950.

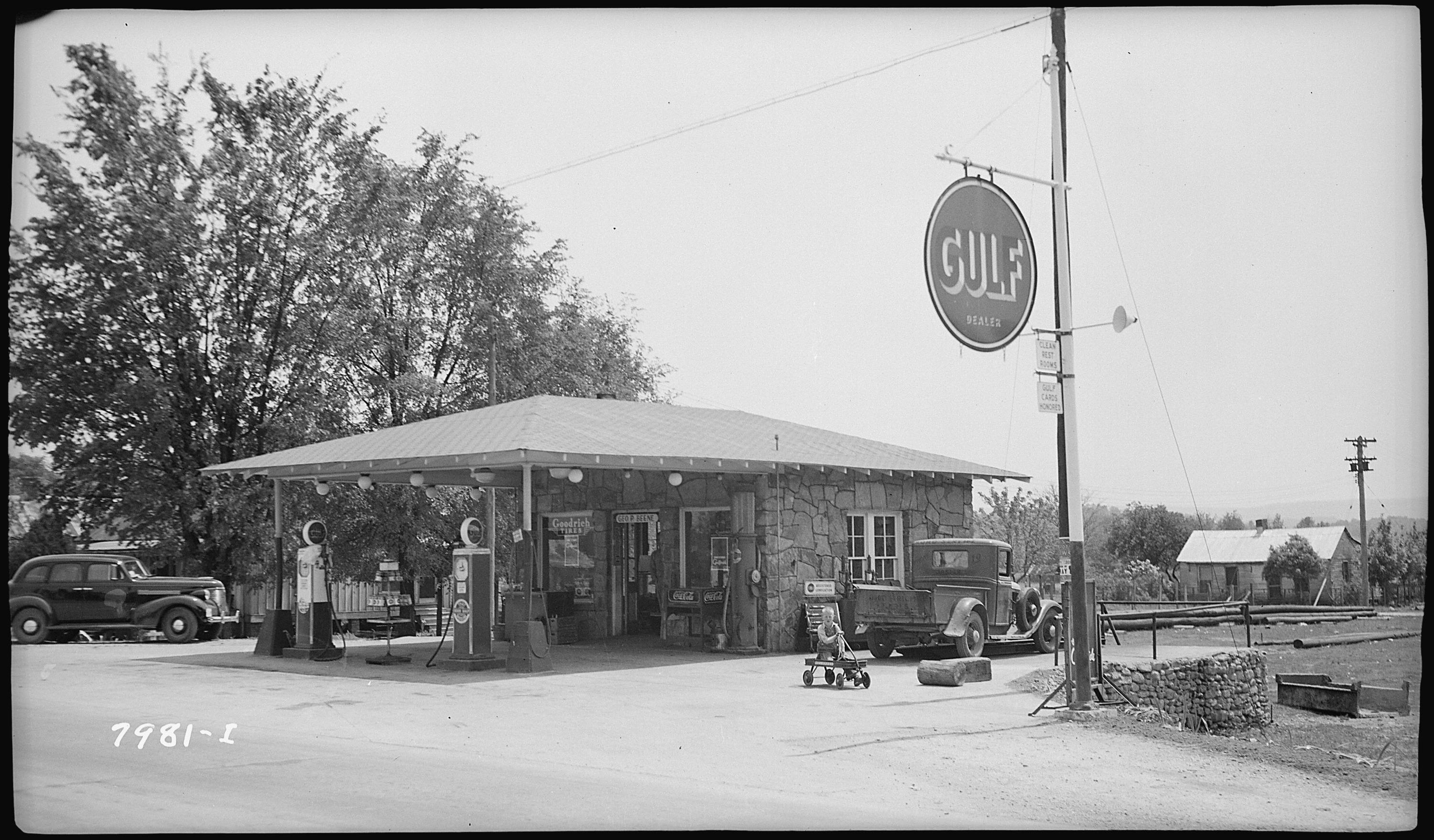
Gulf filling station in Jasper, Tennessee, c. 1939

In 1927 Gulf Oil obtained an option on an oil concession in Bahrain, which was sold to Standard Oil of California in 1928 and led to the founding of the Bahrain Petroleum Company. Gulf Oil was also a minor shareholder in the Iraq Petroleum Company until 1934. In 1934, the Kuwait Oil Company (KOC) was formed as a joint venture by Anglo-Persian Oil Company (APOC) now BP, and Gulf. Both APOC and Gulf held equal shares in the venture. KOC pioneered the exploration for oil in Kuwait during the late 1930s. Oil was discovered at Burgan in 1938, but it was not until 1946 that the first crude oil was shipped. Oil production started from Rawdhatain in 1955 and Minagish in 1959. KOC started gas production in 1964. It was the cheap oil and fuel being shipped from Kuwait that formed the economic basis for Gulf's diverse petroleum sector operations in Europe, the Mediterranean, Africa, and the Indian subcontinent. These last operations were coordinated by Gulf Oil Company, Eastern Hemisphere Ltd. (GOCEH) from their offices at 2 Portman Street in London W1. While serving as General Manager and Vice President of Gulf Oil, Willard F. Jones facilitated the expansion of crude oil import from Kuwait, a nation that was - at the time - a yet incipient supply region to the United States. This expansion program implemented by Robert E. Garret and Jones consisted of construction of a fleet of supertankers and was meant to "result in a sharp increase in the processing of crude oil and various petroleum products at a time when the domestic demand for (such) products (was) at an unprecedented peak."

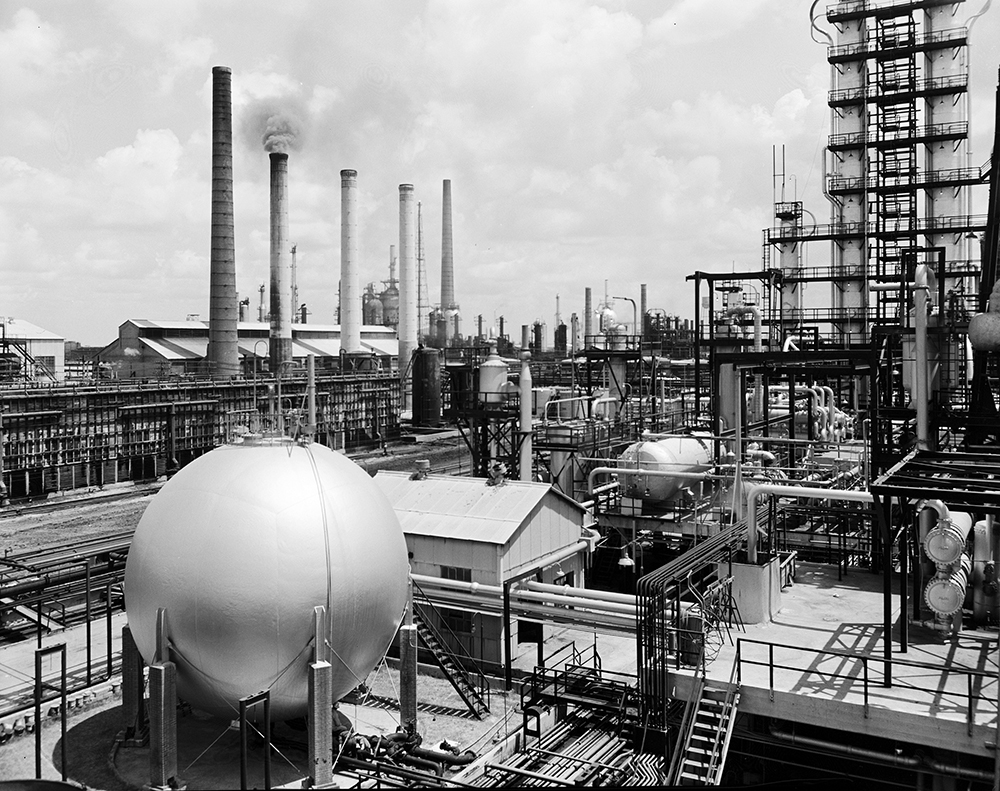
Gulf Oil's Port Arthur, Texas, refinery, alkylation area, (1956)

Gulf expanded on a worldwide basis from the end of the Second World War. The company leveraged its international drilling experience to other areas of the world, and by mid-1943 had established a presence in the eastern oil fields of Venezuela as the Mene Grande Oil Company (see San Tomé, Venezuela). Much of the company's retail sales expansion was through the acquisition of privately owned chains of filling stations in various countries, allowing Gulf outlets to sell product (sometimes through "matching" arrangements) from the oil that it was "lifting" in Canada, the Gulf of Mexico, Kuwait, and Venezuela. Some of these acquisitions were to prove less than resilient in the face of economic and political developments from the 1970s on. Gulf invested heavily in product technology and developed many specialty products, particularly for application in the maritime and aviation engineering sectors. It was particularly noted for its range of lubricants and greases.

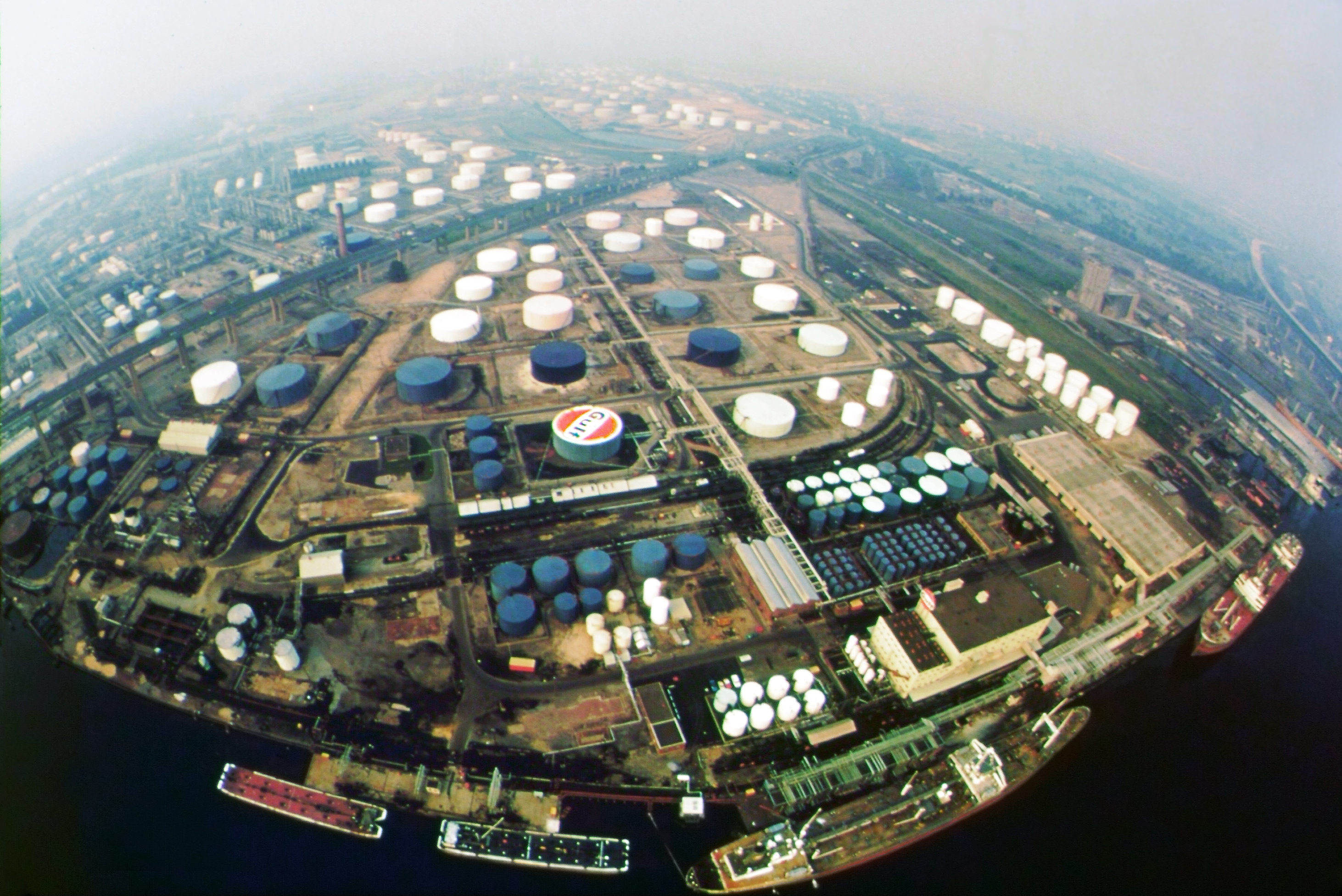
Gulf and ARCO tank farms and tanker docks, Port of Philadelphia, 1973

Gulf Oil reached the peak of its development around 1970. In that year, the company processed 1.3 million barrels (210,000 m^{3}) of crude daily, held assets worth $6.5 billion ($53.89 billion today), employed 58,000 employees worldwide, and was owned by 163,000 shareholders. In addition to its petroleum marketing interests, Gulf was a major producer of petrochemicals, plastics, and agricultural chemicals. Through its subsidiary, Gulf General Atomic, Inc., it was also active in the nuclear energy sector. Gulf abandoned its involvement in the nuclear sector after a failed deal to build atomic power plants in Romania in the mid-1970s.

In 1974, the Kuwait National Assembly took a 60 percent stake in the equity of KOC with the remaining 40 percent divided equally between BP and Gulf. The Kuwaitis took over the rest of the equity in 1975, giving them full ownership of KOC. This meant that Gulf (EH) had to start supplying its downstream operations in Europe with crude bought on the world market at commercial prices. The whole GOC(EH) edifice now became highly marginal in an economic sense. Many of the marketing companies that Gulf had established in Europe were never truly viable on a stand-alone basis. In 1976 during the nationalization of Venezuelan oil, the transfer of properties, benefits, equipment of Gulf Oil to PDVSA was carried out without any setback and with full satisfaction on both parts.

Gulf was at the forefront of various projects in the late 1960s intended to adjust the world oil industry to developments of the time including closure of the Suez Canal after the 1967 war. In particular, Gulf undertook the construction of deep-water terminals at Bantry Bay in Ireland and Okinawa in Japan capable of handling Ultra Large Crude Carrier (ULCC) vessels serving the European and Asian markets respectively. In 1968, the Universe Ireland was added to Gulf's tanker fleet. At 312,000 long tons deadweight (DWT), this was the largest vessel in the world and incapable of berthing at most normal ports.

Gulf also participated in a partnership with other majors, including Texaco, to build the Pembroke Catalytic Cracker refinery at Milford Haven and the associated Mainline Pipelines fuel distribution network. The eventual reopening of the Suez Canal and upgrading of the older European oil terminals (Europoort and Marchwood) meant that the financial return from these projects was not all that had been hoped for. The Bantry terminal was devastated by the explosion of a Total tanker, the M/V Betelgeuse, in January 1979 (Whiddy Island disaster) and it was never fully reopened. The Irish government took over ownership of the terminal in 1986 and held its strategic oil reserve there.

In the 1970s, Gulf participated in the development of new oilfields in the UK North Sea and in Cabinda, although these were high-cost operations that never compensated for the loss of Gulf's interest in Kuwait. A mercenary army had to be raised to protect the oil installations in Cabinda during the Angolan civil war. The Angolan connection was another "special relationship" that attracted comment. In the late 1970s, Gulf was effectively funding a Soviet bloc regime in Africa while the US government was attempting to overthrow that regime by supporting the UNITA rebels led by Jonas Savimbi.

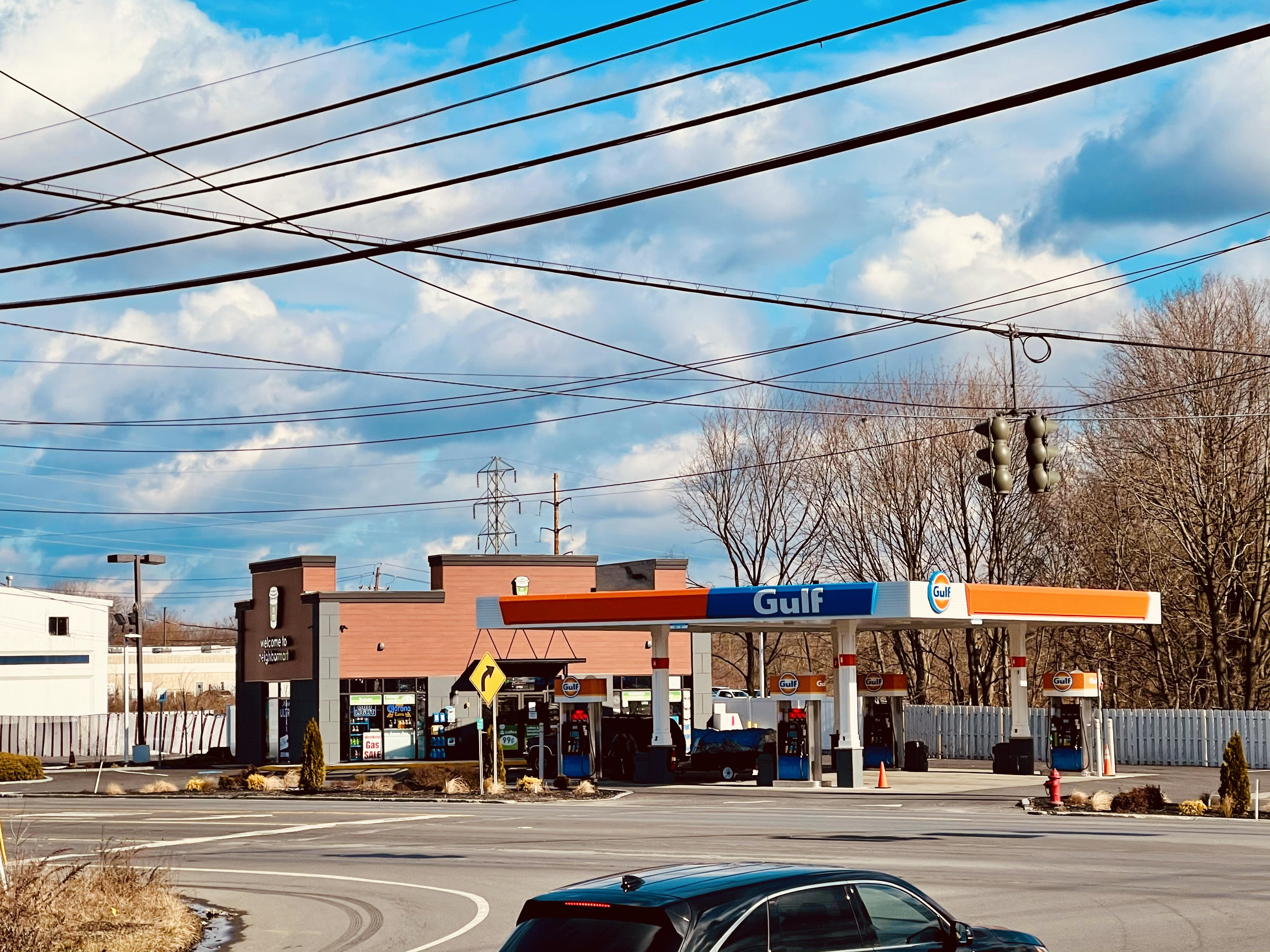
Gulf fuel station operated by Gas Land Petroleum, Inc.

In 1975, several senior Gulf executives, including chairman Bob Dorsey, were implicated in the making of illegal "political contributions" and were forced to step down from their positions. This loss of senior personnel at a critical time in Gulf's fortunes may have had a bearing on the events that followed.

Gulf's operations worldwide were struggling financially in the recession of the early 1980s, so Gulf's management devised the "Big Jobber" strategic realignment in 1981 (along with a program of selective divestments) to maintain viability. The Big Jobber strategy recognized that the day of the integrated, multi-national oil major might be over, since it involved concentrating on those parts of the supply chain where Gulf had a competitive advantage.

=== Marketing and promotions ===
In the late 1930s, Gulf's aviation manager, Major Alford J. Williams, had the Grumman Aircraft Engineering Corporation construct two modified biplanes, cleaned-up versions of the Grumman F3F Navy fighter, for promotional use by the company. Wearing Gulf Oil company colors and logos, the Grumman G-22 "Gulfhawk II", registered NR1050, was delivered in December 1936, and in 1938 Maj. Williams flew it on a tour of Europe. A second scavenger pump and five drain lines were added to the engine installation that allowed the aircraft to be flown inverted for up to thirty minutes. This aircraft is now preserved in the National Air and Space Museum in Washington, D.C. A second airplane, the Grumman G-32 "Gulfhawk III", registered NC1051, was delivered on May 6, 1938. Impressed by the Army Air Force in November 1942 for use as a VIP transport and designated a UC-103, it crashed in the southern Florida Everglades in early 1943.

Gulf Oil was the primary sponsor for NBC News special events coverage in the 1960s, notably for coverage of the U.S. space program. It also became a sponsor for a program called NBC News Special Report. The logo even appeared on the front cross-shaped desk of every special event and coverage broadcast by the network and it was notably used by Chet Huntley and David Brinkley or the other correspondents since the 1964 Republican National Convention. The company used the connection to its advantage by offering giveaway or promotional items at its stations, including sticker sheets of space mission logos, a paper punch-out lunar module model kit, and a book titled "We Came in Peace," containing pictures of the Apollo 11 Moon landing. Gulf was also a major sponsor of Walt Disney's Wonderful World of Color, which also aired on NBC. Disney magazines and activity books were often given away with a gas fill-up. Gulf was also noted for its "Tourgide" road maps.

One particularly memorable Gulf advertisement carried by NBC during their coverage of the Apollo missions showed aerial and onboard views of the Universe Ireland with Tommy Makem and the Clancy Brothers singing "Bringin' Home the Oil" – a tribute to the opening of Gulf's operations in Bantry Bay.

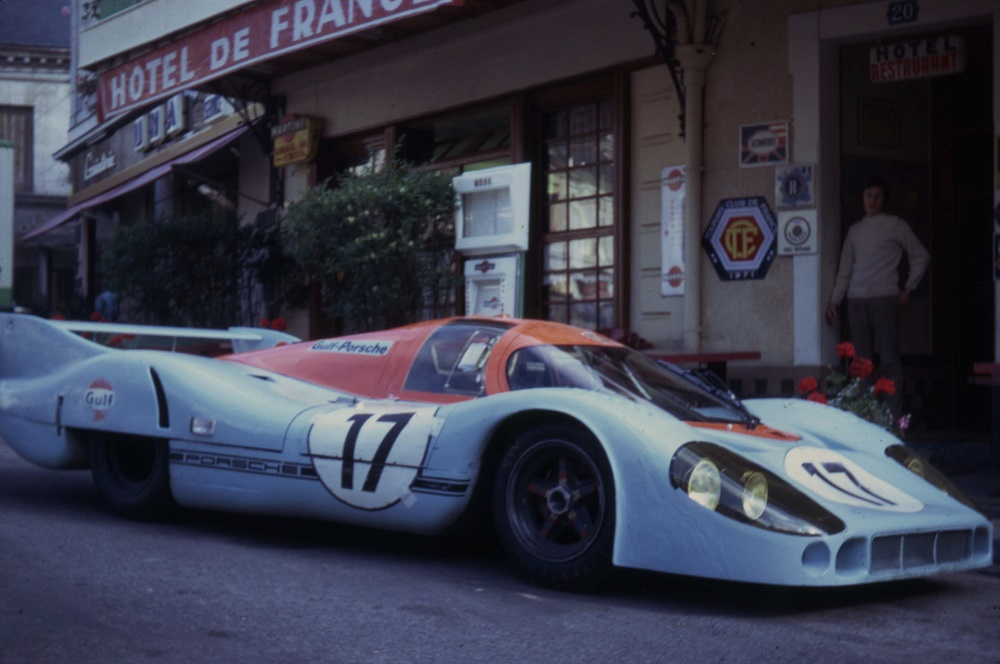
Gulf Oil–sponsored Porsche 917 LH raced by Derek Bell & Jo Siffert at the 1971 24 Hours of Le Mans, parked outside the Hotel de France

In 1937, Gulf Oil became involved in racing when they purchased the racing car project of Ira Vail and Harry Miller and brought the project into the Gulf Research and Development Company. This produced innovative new cars that were the designs of Miller which became the first mid-engined cars to race in the Indianapolis 500. The cars also featured four-wheel-drive which was very novel at the time, disc brakes and a supercharged 6-cylinder engine. The only notable restriction was that the engine needed to run on standard Gulf pump fuel. Four of the cars were built with 3-liter engines and one was entered in the 1938 "500" but did not qualify as much testing was needed to get the car to the point of being ready for competition. Three of the Gulf-Miller cars were entered in 1939 with one, driven by George Bailey making the race with a second-row qualifying position. Another of the cars was crashed in practice and the third didn't attempt qualifying. The Bailey car dropped out of the race with a broken valve. In 1940, a fatal practice accident caused the team to withdraw. In 1941, two of the Gulf cars qualified but one was destroyed in a race morning garage fire and the other dropped out of the race early. Gulf sold the car in 1946 to Preston Tucker who ran it as the "Tucker Torpedo Special" that year in its last race appearance.

Gulf Oil was most synonymous for its association with auto racing, as it famously sponsored the John Wyer Automotive team in the 1960s and early '70s. The signature light blue and orange color scheme associated with its Ford GT40 and Porsche 917 is one of the most famous corporate racing colors and has been replicated by other racing teams sponsored by Gulf. Much of its popularity is attributed to the fact that in the 1971 film Le Mans, Steve McQueen's character, Michael Delaney, drives for the Gulf team. As a result of McQueen's increasing popularity following his death and the increasing popularity of the Heuer Monaco which he wore in the film, TAG Heuer released a limited edition of the watch with the Gulf logo and trademark color scheme. In the same era, Gulf Oil also sponsored Team McLaren during the Bruce McLaren days, which used a papaya orange color scheme with Gulf blue for lettering.

From 1963 to 1980, Gulf Oil had a formal agreement with Holiday Inn, the world's largest lodging chain, for which Holiday Inn's in the U.S. and Canada would accept Gulf credit cards for food and lodging. In return, Gulf placed service stations on the premises of many Holiday Inn properties along major U.S. highways to provide one-stop availability for fuel, auto service, food and lodging. Many older Holiday Inns still have those original Gulf stations on their properties, some in operation and some closed, but few operate today as Gulf stations.

Gulf No-Nox fuel was promoted with a bucking horse leaving an imprint of two horseshoes. Several promotions centered on the two horseshoes. In 1966, bright orange 3-D plastic self-adhesive horseshoes for car bumpers were given away. Another popular giveaway was during the 1968 election season, gold horseshoe lapel pins featuring either a Democratic donkey or a Republican elephant.

== Demise ==
By 1980, Gulf exhibited many of the characteristics of a giant corporation that had lost its way. It had a huge but poorly performing asset portfolio, associated with a depressed share price. The stock market value of Gulf started to drop below the break-up value of its assets. Such a situation was bound to attract the interest of corporate raiders, although a corporation in the top 100 of the Fortune 500 was in the early 1980s thought immune to takeover risk.

Its undoing as an independent company began in 1982 when T. Boone Pickens, an Amarillo, Texas, oilman and corporate raider (or greenmailer), and owner of Mesa Petroleum, made an offer for the comparatively larger (but still considered "non-major" oil company) Cities Service Company (more generally known by the name Citgo) from Tulsa, Oklahoma which was then trading in the low 20s. Pickens first privately offered $45 a share for a friendly takeover and then later made a $50 a share public offer when Cities' CEO rejected the friendly offer. Gulf forestalled Mesa's takeover attempt by offering $63 a share in a friendly offer which Cities (by then trading at $37) accepted. Cities then bought out Pickens for $55 a share. Once Pickens was gone, Gulf reneged on its buyout offer, supposedly over a dispute regarding accuracy of Cities Service's reserves, and the stock price of Cities plunged, triggering stockholder lawsuits as well as distrust for Gulf's management on Wall Street and among financing investment banks who bet big in assisting Gulf to defeat Mesa only to be left broke when Gulf backed out. Cities Service was ultimately sold to Occidental Petroleum, and the retail operations were resold to Southland Corporation, the operators of 7-Eleven stores. Gulf's termination of the Cities Service acquisition resulted in more than 15 years of shareholder litigation against Gulf (and later Chevron).

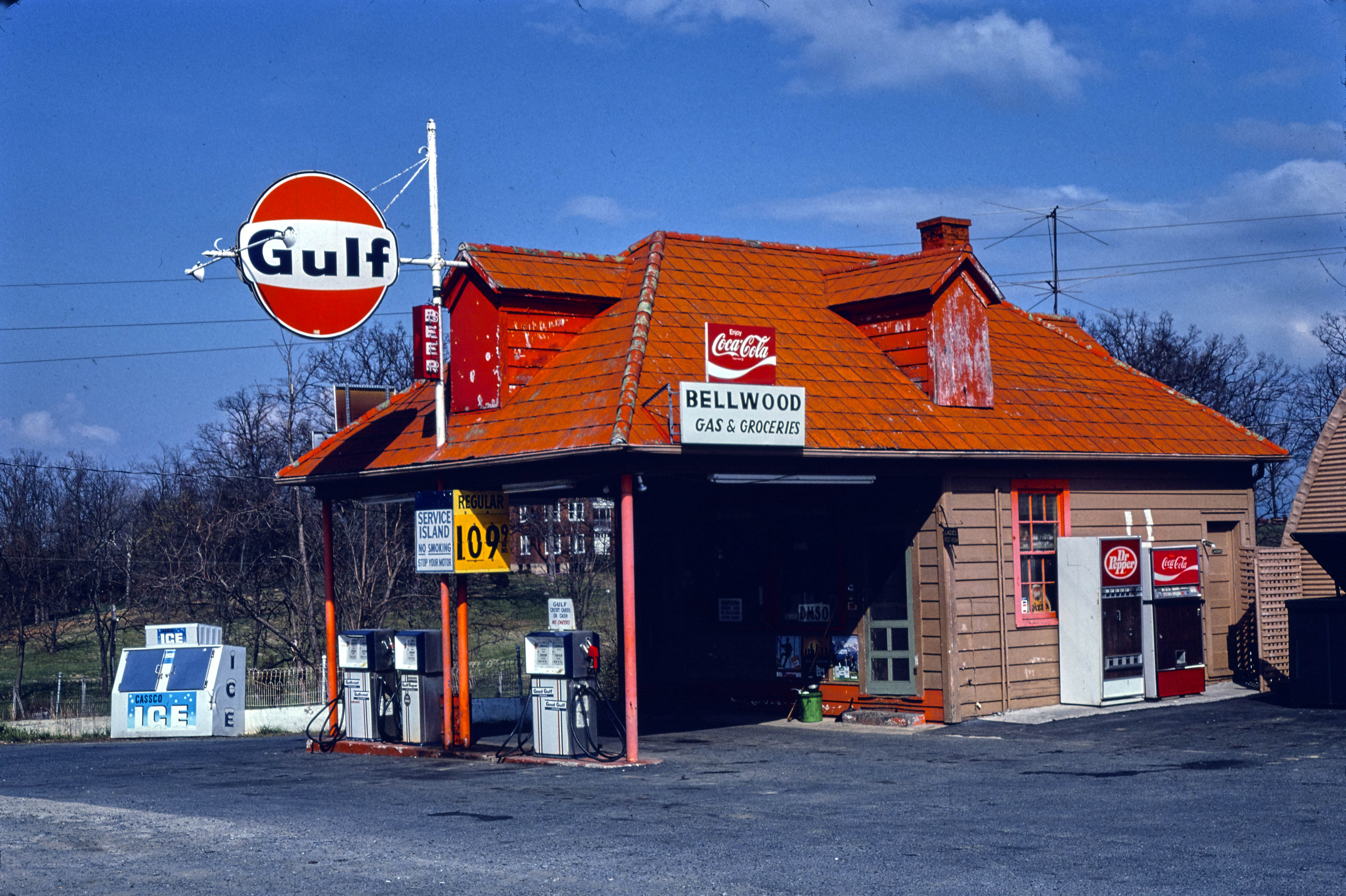
"Bellwood Gas & Groceries" Gulf gas station in Fort Defiance, Virginia; photo by John Margolies, circa 1982

With declining margins in the industry and left without Citgo's reserves, Mesa and its investor partners kept hunting for a takeover target, only to discover while fighting Gulf for Citgo how increasingly top-heavy its portfolio and declining reserves were undervaluing its overall assets. They subtly but quickly acquired 4.9 percent of Gulf Oil's stock by early fall 1983, just shy of having to declare themselves and their intent at 5 percent to the SEC. In the ten days allowed to prepare the SEC filing, Mesa and its investor partners accelerated buying to 11 percent of the company's stock, larger than the founding Mellon family's share, by October 1983. Gulf responded to Mesa's interest by calling a shareholders' meeting for late November 1983 and subsequently engaged in a proxy war on changing the corporation's by-laws to minimize arbitrage. Pickens made loud criticisms of the existing Gulf management and offered an alternative business plan intended to release shareholder value through a royalty trust that management argued would "slim down" Gulf's market share. Pickens had acquired the reputation of being a corporate raider whose skill lay in making profits out of bidding for companies but without actually acquiring them. During the early 1980s alone, he made failed bids for Cities Service, General American Oil, Gulf, Phillips Petroleum and Unocal. The process of making such bids would promote a frenzy of asset divestiture and debt reduction in the target companies. This is a standard defensive tactic calculated to boost the current share price, although possibly at the expense of long-term strategic advantage. The target shares would rise sharply in price, at which point Pickens would dispose of his interest at a substantial profit.

Gulf management and directors took the view that the Mesa bid represented an undervaluation of the Gulf business as a long-term going concern and that it was not in the interest of Gulf shareholders. James Lee, Gulf's CEO and Chairman, even claimed during the November 1983 shareholders meeting to address the Mesa ownership that Pickens' royalty trust idea was nothing more than a "get-rich-quick scheme" that would undermine the corporation's profit potential in the coming decades. Gulf, therefore, sought to resist Pickens by various means, including refiling as a Delaware corporation, voiding the ability of shareholders to cumulatively vote (fearing that Pickens would use his shares to gain control of the board) and listening to offers from Ashland Oil (which would double Gulf's price from its pre-Mesa level), General Electric (two years before it took over the media company NBC/RCA) and finally, in March 1984, accepted an offer from Chevron of $80 per share, totalling US$13.2 billion (equivalent to $34.6 billion in 2025), to act as its white knight. Gulf divested many of its worldwide operating subsidiaries and then merged with Chevron by the spring of 1985. The Mesa group of investors was reported to have made a profit of $760 million (equivalent to $1.9 billion in 2025) when it assigned its Gulf shares to Chevron. Pickens has claimed that after realizing a more than doubling of stock appreciation for Gulf shareholders (as well as its management that fought him at every turn), Mesa's shares were the last to be paid out by Chevron.

The forced merger of Gulf and Chevron was controversial, with the U.S. Senate considering legislation to freeze oil industry mergers for a year—before the Reagan administration made it known it opposed government intervention in the matter and would veto any bill. However, Pickens and Lee (Gulf's CEO) were summoned to testify before the Senate months before the merger was hammered out and the matter was referred to the Federal Trade Commission (FTC). The FTC only approved the deal subject to strict conditions. Never before had a "small operator" successfully taken apart a Fortune 500 corporation, or, in Gulf's case, a "Fortune 10" corporation. The merger sent even deeper shock waves through the long-time exclusive "Seven Sisters" club of major integrated oil companies that defined themselves as elevated from the "non-major independents". A board member of Exxon even admitted in the mid-1980s that "mostly all we talk about in board meetings anymore is T. Boone Pickens". Chevron, to settle with the government antitrust requirements, sold some Gulf stations and a refinery in the eastern United States to British Petroleum (BP) and Cumberland Farms in 1985 as well as some of the international operations.

The effect on the Pittsburgh area was severe as close to 900 PhD and research jobs and 600 headquarters (accounting, law, clerical) jobs were transferred to California or cut, a payroll of $54 million (equivalent to $141.4 million in 2025) and corporate charity to 50 Western Pennsylvania organizations worth $2 million/year (equivalent to $5.2 million/year in 2025). These losses were mitigated some with the donation of Gulf Labs in suburban north Pittsburgh to the University of Pittsburgh to be used as a research business incubator along with $5 million (equivalent to $12.7 million/year in 2025) in maintenance and seed money. The "Gulf Labs" research complex consisted of 55 multi-story buildings with 800,000 square feet (74,000 m^{2}) on 85 acres (34 ha) and including several chemical labs, petroleum production and refining areas and even a nuclear laboratory complete with reactor in 1985 and employed close to 2,000 engineers and scientists operating with a $100 million budget (equivalent to $253.8 million in 2025) from Gulf/Chevron. After its donation, it was renamed the University of Pittsburgh Applied Research Center or U-PARC and opened to small technology, computer and engineering firms as well as graduate level research.

== Aftermath ==
BP, Chevron, Cumberland Farms and other companies that acquired former Gulf operations continued to use the Gulf name through the early 1990s. This caused consumer confusion in the US retail market as the parent companies would not accept each other's credit cards. All former Gulf stations franchised by BP and Chevron in the United States have since been converted to those names. Gulf Oil Limited Partnership (GOLP), based in Framingham, Massachusetts, has bought a license for North American rights to the Gulf brand from Chevron. Chevron still owned the Gulf brand, but was making almost no direct use of it. In January 2010, GOLP bought the entire brand from Chevron and began a nationwide expansion campaign. GOLP operates a distribution network reaching from Maine to Ohio. Most Gulf-branded filling stations in North America are owned by Cumberland Farms of Framingham, which owns a two-thirds interest in GOLP. In addition there are some independently owned franchises still operating under the Gulf brand within North America, such as Nu-Tier Brands, Inc., which is licensed by GOLP to blend and distribute Gulf-branded lubricants.

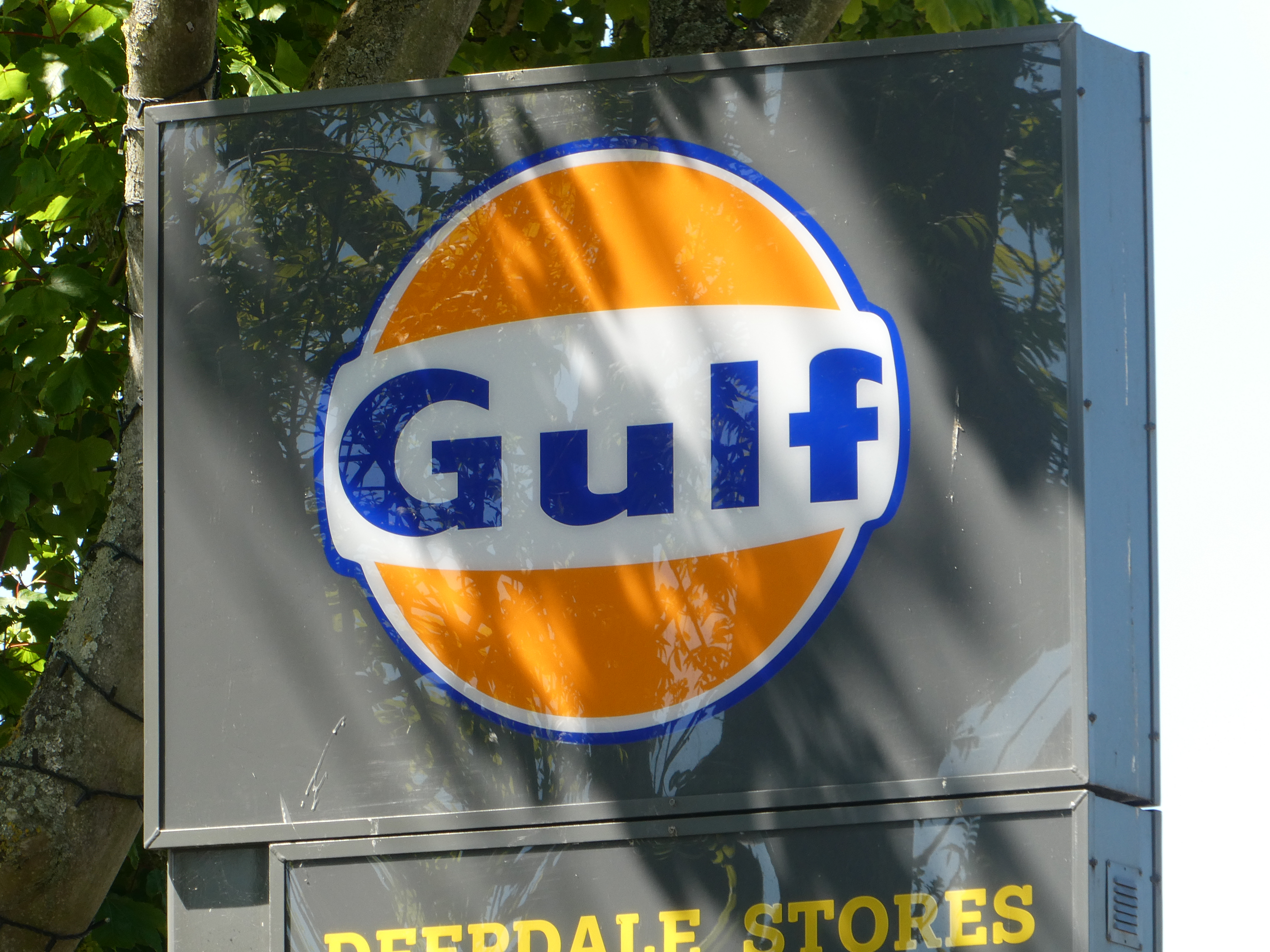
A Gulf-branded filling station sign in Brancaster Staithe, United Kingdom, pictured in May 2021.

Gulf Oil International (GOI) owns the rights to the Gulf brand outside the United States, Spain & Portugal. It is now owned by the Hinduja Group. After they acquired a large share from the Taher family, a major Saudi Arabian family led by Dr. Abdulhadi H. Taher (former governor of the Saudi Petroleum and Mineral organization and board member of Aramco). GOI trades mainly in lubricants, oils, and greases. GOI is also involved in franchising the Gulf brand to operators in the petroleum and automotive sectors; Gulf-branded filling stations can be found in several countries including the UK, Belgium, Germany, Ireland, Slovakia, Czechia, the Netherlands, Jordan, Finland, Armenia and Turkey. GOI has direct and indirect interests in a number of businesses that use the Gulf brand under license.

The Canadian exploration, production, and distribution arm of Gulf Oil was sold to Olympia and York in 1985. From 1992 it continued as an independent oil company (Gulf Canada Resources) until its acquisition by Conoco in 2002.

Most Gulf downstream operations in Europe were sold to the Kuwait Petroleum Corporation (KPC) in early 1983. The associated Gulf filling stations were converted to trade under the Q8 brand by 1988. However, attempts to sell Gulf Oil (Great Britain) to KPC failed because of irrevocable GOC guarantees given earlier in regard to bonds issued to finance the construction of refinery facilities in the UK. GO(GB) was taken over by Chevron and its stations continued to use the Gulf brand name and insignia until 1997 when the network was sold to Shell, although by this stage a fairly large proportion of Gulf stations were supplied by jobbers rather than Gulf Oil (GB). Gulf completely withdrew from the UK in 1997. This represented the end of the last major "downstream" use of the Gulf brand by Chevron. In the UK, the Gulf brand is now licensed by Certas Energy (GB Oils), who also now own the Pace brand, which was coincidentally formerly owned by the Kuwait Petroleum Corporation.

== Revival ==
GOI and GOLP continue to sell Gulf-branded lubricants worldwide through a network of official licensed companies, joint ventures and wholly owned subsidiary companies. Many of these official Gulf distributors carry out local marketing and sponsorship with the intent to raise the profile of the brand. Of these wholly owned subsidiaries Gulf Oil Corporation India has increased the market profile of the Gulf brand in the Middle East. GOCL have emerged as one of leading lubricants brands in India and run many marketing sponsorships targeted at the youth sector in the country.

GOI licenses the Gulf brand and logo in the UK to the Bayford group, one of the largest independent fuel distributors. Starting in 2001, a new Gulf network of independent stations began appearing across the UK, many of which offered leaded "four-star" petrol, for which Bayford had a special dispensation to sell. At the same time, Gulf Lubricants (UK) Ltd was set up to market Gulf products in the UK, mostly manufactured by the Gulf Netherlands operation. This return by Gulf to the UK after a four-year absence used the slogan "The Return of the Legend". The post-2001 Gulf presence in the UK is a wholly network-based operation. It involves almost no direct Gulf investment in fixed assets, corporate infrastructure, or manufacturing capability. This is a complete contrast to the pre-1997 presence.

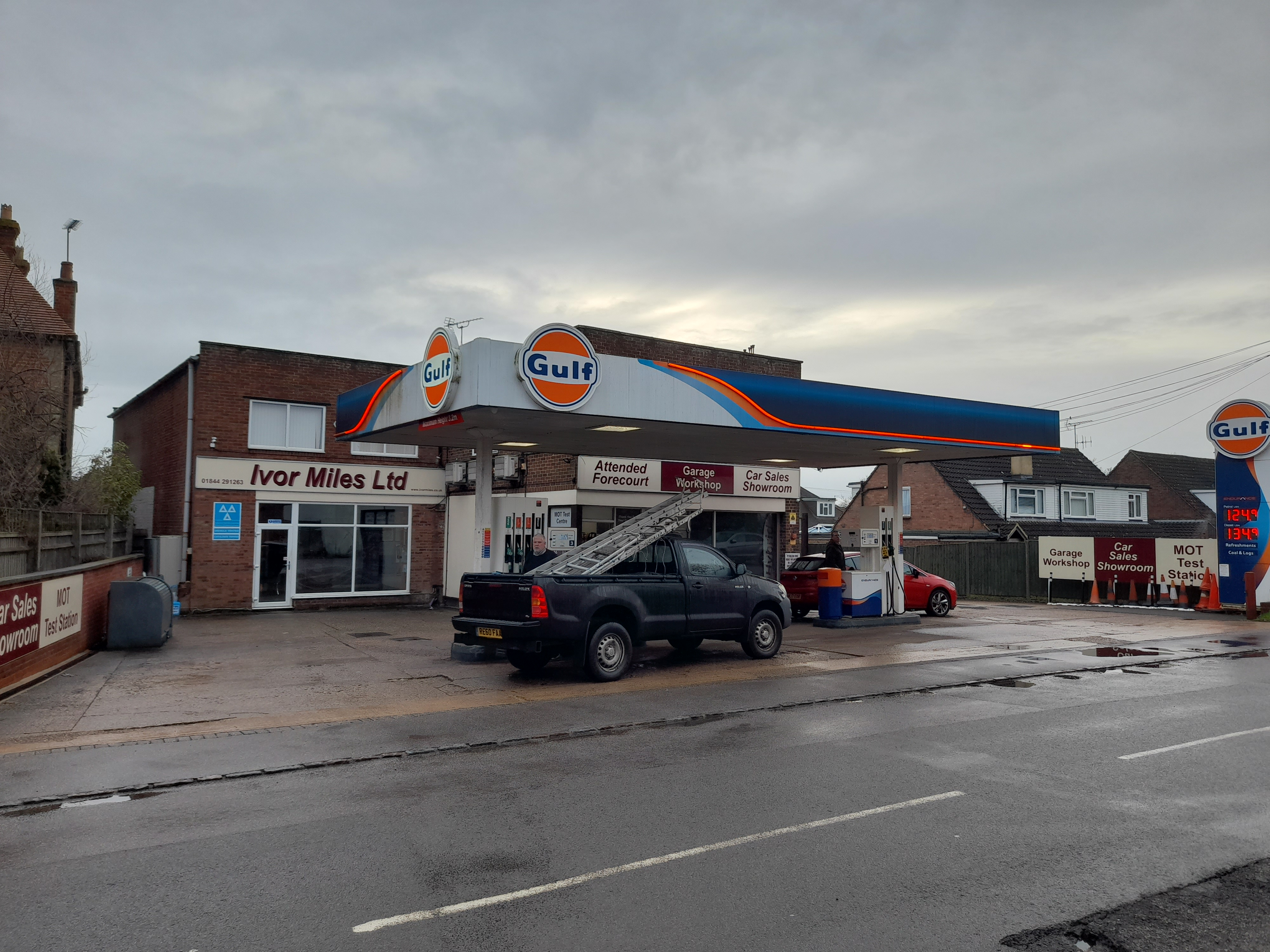
Gulf Petrol Station, Haddenham, United Kingdom in 2026.

In January 2010, after using the name since 1986, Gulf Oil LP acquired all right, title and interest in the Gulf brand name in the United States and announced plans to expand the use of the Gulf brand beyond its parent company's Northeastern United States base. Its promotions have included sponsorship of major sporting events in the area with advertisements for Gulf in New York City, Boston, Philadelphia, and Pittsburgh. To take one case as an illustrative example of the Gulf revival, after Texaco's 2001 merger with Chevron, many former Texaco stations in Pittsburgh switched to Gulf since Chevron does not service the Greater Pittsburgh area. As a result, the Texaco brand name disappeared from the area in June 2004 when the nonexclusive rights agreement with Shell expired, with Shell itself expanding in the area by means other than Texaco. However, in June 2006, Chevron gave exclusive rights to the Texaco brand name in the U.S. In New England, former Exxon stations have been rebranded as Gulf, in accordance with the consent decree that allowed the merger of Exxon and Mobil. Many of the former Exxon stations feature a rectangular logo that fit into the existing sign standards used by Exxon. Gulf refers to the look as its "sunrise" imaging.

In March 2016, Gulf MX announced that they will put their own filling stations in Mexico, which is planned to begin operations in July of the same year to compete with the local company (PEMEX) (as a result of the recent changes in the local laws in matter of energy and oil resources). As said by Sergio De La Vega (CEO of Gulf Mexico), in order to improve a better service, Gulf will make fidelity programs and dedicated smartphone apps. for customers (improving fuel payment into the same, fuel administration and better experience with fidelity programs as another additional benefits) adding to modern service stations with more quality-added services.

=== Marketing ===
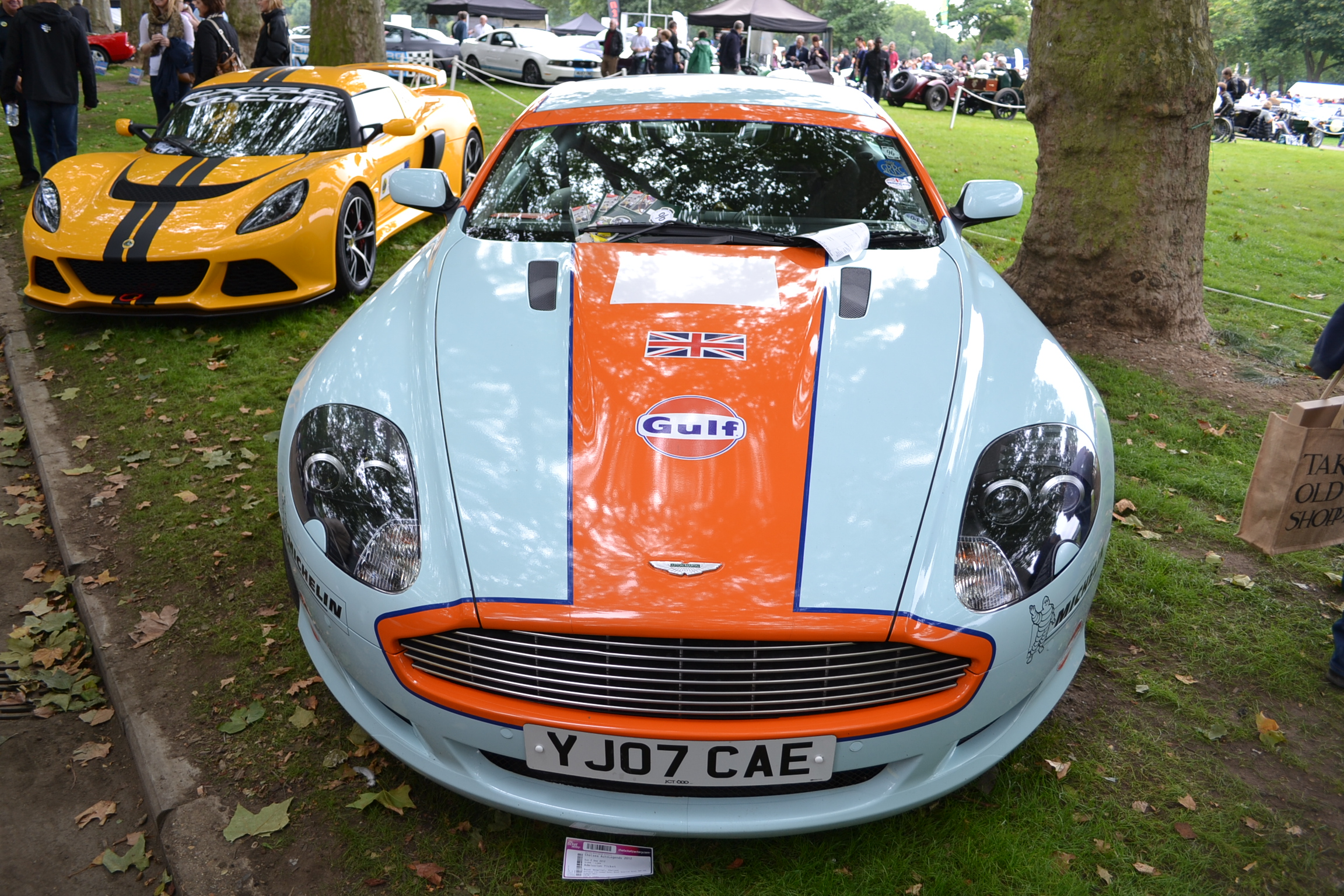
Aston Martin DB9 in Gulf Oil livery, as seen in 2012

The Gulf logo is still used around the world by various businesses. GOI uses it for their marketing activities to focus on the sponsorship of motorsport teams including MotoGP teams Aprilia Racing Team Gresini, Trackhouse Racing and Formula 1 teams McLaren and Williams. This sponsorship is used across the world by Gulf distributors, alongside local activity demonstrating the GOI company ethos of "your local global brand".

Gulf Oil has completed more than 14 years in partnership with the Indian Twenty20 cricket franchise, the Chennai Super Kings, making it among the longest for any sponsor-franchise association in the Indian Premier League (IPL). The Gulf logo is used as the chest branding of the iconic yellow kit of the franchise since 2011.

In July 2020, GOI announced a multi-year strategic partnership with long time partner McLaren which includes Gulf being the preferred lubricant supplier to McLaren Automotive and a special Gulf livery for the 2021 Monaco Grand Prix. In February 2023, GOI announced a multi-year partnership with Williams Racing. For the 2023 Singapore, Japanese and Qatar Grands Prix, Williams raced a special Gulf livery chosen by a fan vote. In 2024, GOI and Williams announced a partnership extension and expansion to include GOI's coffee brand Reviva Coffee as the official coffee partner of Williams from 2025 onwards.

In 2023, Swansea City announced Reviva Coffee as the club's new main shirt sponsor. Gulf Oil have previously sponsored Swansea City between 1993 and 1996. For the 2025–26 season, Swansea City unveiled its third kit in Gulf colors.

== Gulf products ==
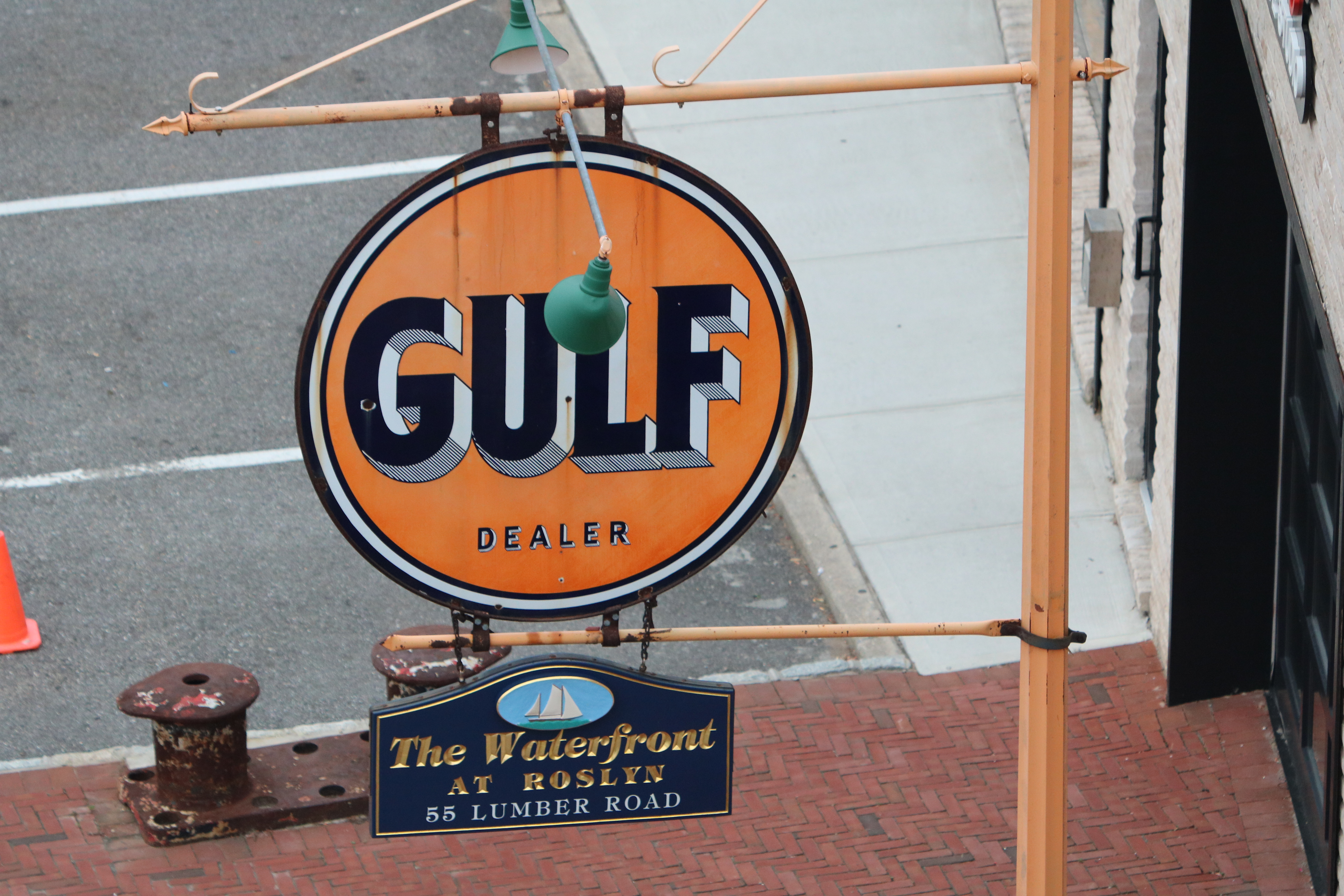
Vintage Gulf Oil sign photographed in Roslyn, New York, 2018

Most filling stations in Europe sell three types of fuel: unleaded, LRP, and diesel. Although these products lack any real brand differentiation, this has not always been the case. Until well into the 1970s, Gulf (in common with other oil companies) sold distinctive brands of petrol/gasoline including subregular Gulftane (briefly a midgrade low lead), Good Gulf regular, Gulf No-Nox premium, Gulf Super Unleaded, and Gulfcrest (Regular Unleaded). Gulfcrest was also a super premium grade in the 1950s and early 1960s. Gulf petrol was sold using the slogans "Good Gulf Gasoline," and "Gulf – the Gas with Guts." Gulf service stations often supplied customers with pens and key rings bearing these slogans. For a few years, beginning in 1966, Gulf stations in the U.S. gave away orange plastic "Extra Kick Horseshoes" to customers who filled their tanks with Gulf's No-Nox premium fuel (the novelty items were commonly mounted on bumpers).

GOI still produces and sells a wide range of branded oil based products including lubricants and greases of all kinds. These include products for a variety of applications ranging from metal working oils to refrigeration oils. Car engine oils include the Gulf Formula, Gulf MAX, and Gulf TEC ranges. Heavy duty diesel engine lubricants include the Gulf Supreme and Gulf Superfleet ranges.

In the summer of 2013, Gulf Oil licensed the "Gulf" name for racing fuels in a return to the American racing scene for the 2014 competition season. The fuels were announced at the Performance Racing Industry Show in Indianapolis, Indiana, in December 2013. The racing fuels support the World Racing League and the Formula Atlantic Championship in the United States.

== Leadership ==
=== President ===
1. Andrew William Mellon, 1907–1908
2. William Larimer Mellon Sr., 1908–1931
3. James Frank Drake, 1931–1948
4. Sidney Anton Swensrud, 1948–1953
5. William Kepler Whiteford Jr., 1953–1960
6. Ernest Delwin Brockett Jr., 1960–1965
7. Bob Rawls Dorsey, 1965–1972
8. James Edward Lee, 1973–1981
9. Edward B. Walker III, 1981–1986

=== Chairman of the Board ===
1. William Larimer Mellon Sr., 1931–1948
2. James Frank Drake, 1948–1953
3. Sidney Anton Swensrud, 1953–1957
4. David Proctor, 1958–1959
5. Ralph Omer Rhoades, 1959–1960
6. William Kepler Whiteford Jr., 1960–1965
7. Ernest Delwin Brockett Jr., 1965–1971
8. Bob Rawls Dorsey, 1972–1976
9. Jerry McDuffie McAfee, 1976–1981
10. James Edward Lee, 1981–1986

== See also ==
- 1975 Philadelphia Refinery Fire
- Gulf Oil LP
- Willard F. Jones
- Bill Noël
- Mid-Sea Road
- U-PARC
