= G. Willing Pepper =

G. Willing Pepper (1909-April 21, 2001), known as “Wing” was a corporate executive, the former president of the Scott Paper Company, and a notable Philadelphia philanthropist. He combined active philanthropy with the use of commercial skills to improve public health.

Pepper was a member of old Philadelphia family. He attended St. Mark's School of Southborough, Massachusetts and continued studies at the University of Pennsylvania in Philadelphia. Pepper became treasurer and a director of Scott Paper in 1940. After service in the U.S.Navy in the Pacific Theater during World War II, Pepper rose to vice chairman of Scott Paper and oversaw the swift growth of its overseas operations.

After retiring from Scott Paper, Pepper served as vice chairman of the Fox Chase Cancer Center's Institute for Cancer Research in Philadelphia. In his honor. Fox Chase established a Wing Pepper Chair in Cancer Research in 1999. Pepper was credited by Fox Chase for significant work bringing the first hepatitis B vaccine, invented at Fox Chase, into commercial development.
