= Cleo F. Craig =

President of the American Telephone and Telegraph Company (1951–1956)

Cleo F. Craig (1883–1978) was an American telephone executive who was president of the American Telephone and Telegraph Company (AT&T) from 1951 to 1956 and chairman of its board from 1956 to 1957.

== Early life and education ==
Craig was born in 1883 in Rich Hill, Missouri. He studied electrical engineering at the University of Missouri and graduated with a Bachelor of Science in 1913.

== Career ==
Soon after graduating, Craig took a job with AT&T in St. Louis, working as a plant equipment attendant. His posts at the company over the years included equipment man, division inspector and plant superintendent. He moved to New York City in 1922 to become a plant accountant at the headquarters of Long Lines, AT&T's long-distance division. He later became general manager of Long Lines and served as a vice president in four of the company's divisions.

Craig led AT&T as president from 1951 until 1956, when he became chairman of the board. He held that post until 1957.
