= Erich Muenter =

American failed assassin (1871–1915)

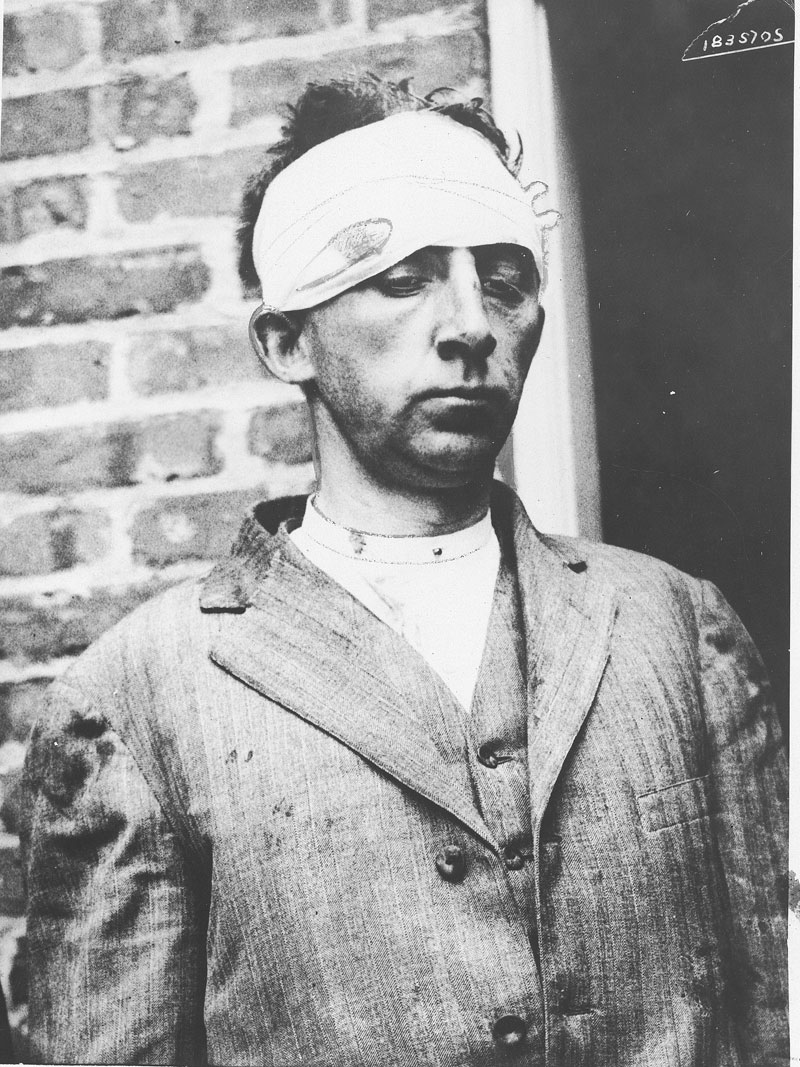
- Muenter after his arrest in 1915
- Born: Erich Heinrich Eugen Münter; March 25, 1871; Uelzen, Province of Hanover, Kingdom of Prussia, German Empire
- Died: July 6, 1915 (aged 44); Mineola, New York, United States
- Cause of death: Suicide by jumping
- Other names: Erich Münter; Eric Muenter; Erich Holt; Frank Holt
- Education: University of Chicago (AB) Texas A&M University (BA) Cornell University (PhD)
- Occupation: Instructor of German
- Known for: Bombing the United States Capitol; Attempting to assassinate J. P. Morgan Jr.
- Spouse(s): Leone Krembs (m. 1901–died 1906); Leona Caroline Sensabaugh (m. 1910–1915; his death)
- Children: 4

Erich Muenter (born Erich Heinrich Eugen Münter; March 25, 1871 – July 6, 1915), also known as Eric Muenter, Erich Holt or Frank Holt, was a German-American political terrorist, activist, spy, professor and failed assassin. Employed as a German professor at elite American universities, he was also a spy and a "fanatic in the clandestine service of the Imperial German government." While an instructor at Harvard University, he poisoned and killed his pregnant wife with arsenic.

He appeared as Cornell University professor Frank Holt who contacted the German spy network which undertook to sabotage US aid to the war in Europe against Germany. In 1915, he planted a bomb that exploded in the US Capitol, shot Jack Morgan, son of financier J. P. Morgan in his home, and predicted the bombing of a steamship bound for England before committing suicide while in police custody. His activities, and those of other Germans, were played up by the press as "Hun barbarity"; anti-German sentiment rose in the years as America eventually entered the war with Germany.

== Biography ==
Eric Muenter was born in Uelzen, Province of Hanover (now Lower Saxony), Prussia. Muenter's baptismal record at St. Marien Church list his parents as Ernst Heinrich Victor Münter (1832–1892) from Nindorf and Charlotte Lisette Julietta "Julia" Clacius (1833–1916) from Bremke. After graduating Uelzen Gymnasium, he immigrated with his parents and three sisters to Chicago at the age of 18. While still a student, Muenter worked as a German and French instructor at Racine College and Kenwood Preparatory School between 1895 and 1896, then graduated with his A.B. from the University of Chicago in 1899.

From 1897 to 1900, Muenter taught at South Side Academy in Chicago for a few months before studying and working 14 months abroad, including at K.k. Akademie für Orientalische Sprachen in Vienna as an English teacher in 1901. In 1902, he taught Germanic language and literature courses at the University of Kansas for a one-year tenure and then began teaching as an instructor at Harvard University, where he was also a doctoral student.

=== Murder of wife ===
While teaching German at Harvard University in 1906 he poisoned his pregnant wife. Leone Muenter (née Krembs) died on April 16, of arsenic poisoning. On April 27, Cambridge, Massachusetts police issued a warrant for the arrest of Erich Muenter. On June 5, 1906, Muenter mailed a pamphlet entitled "Protest" to his wife's family from New Orleans. He vowed that he would "annihilate" Chicago and Cambridge in one blow if he could for accusing him of poisoning his wife, and claimed that he actually feared the punishment inflicted on Christian Scientists who refused medical treatment. He fled before this was discovered, and spent the next decade in various places in the United States under assumed identities. He was a committed German nationalist and opposed the US policy of selling arms to Great Britain and France, Germany's enemies in World War I.

=== German saboteur and life as "Frank Holt" ===
Muenter went underground and assumed the name "Frank Holt", working at a gold mining company in El Oro, Mexico. He then moved to Texas where he graduated from Texas A&M University in 1909 and married a new wife, Leona Sensabaugh, on May 27, 1910, in Amarillo. He got teaching posts at a variety of colleges, including at the University of Oklahoma from 1909 to 1910, Vanderbilt University from 1910 to 1911, and Emory and Henry College in Virginia from 1911 to 1913. He almost always taught German, although at Vanderbilt he taught French. He began teaching as an instructor of German at Cornell University in 1913 and earned a PhD there in September 1914.

That same year, Muenter was inspired by the book The War and America by Hugo Münsterberg, another German sympathizer, who had been on the faculty at Harvard along with Muenter. He became involved with the German spy group Abteilung IIIb, which planted time bombs on vessels carrying arms for the Allies from US ports.

German intelligence was later alleged to have supported his attacks, but Muenter maintained he was just an angry peace activist acting on his own. Muenter clearly had connections to the German network and taunted authorities with veiled statements about Abteilung IIIB's ship sabotage efforts.

=== 1915 United States Capitol bomb attack ===
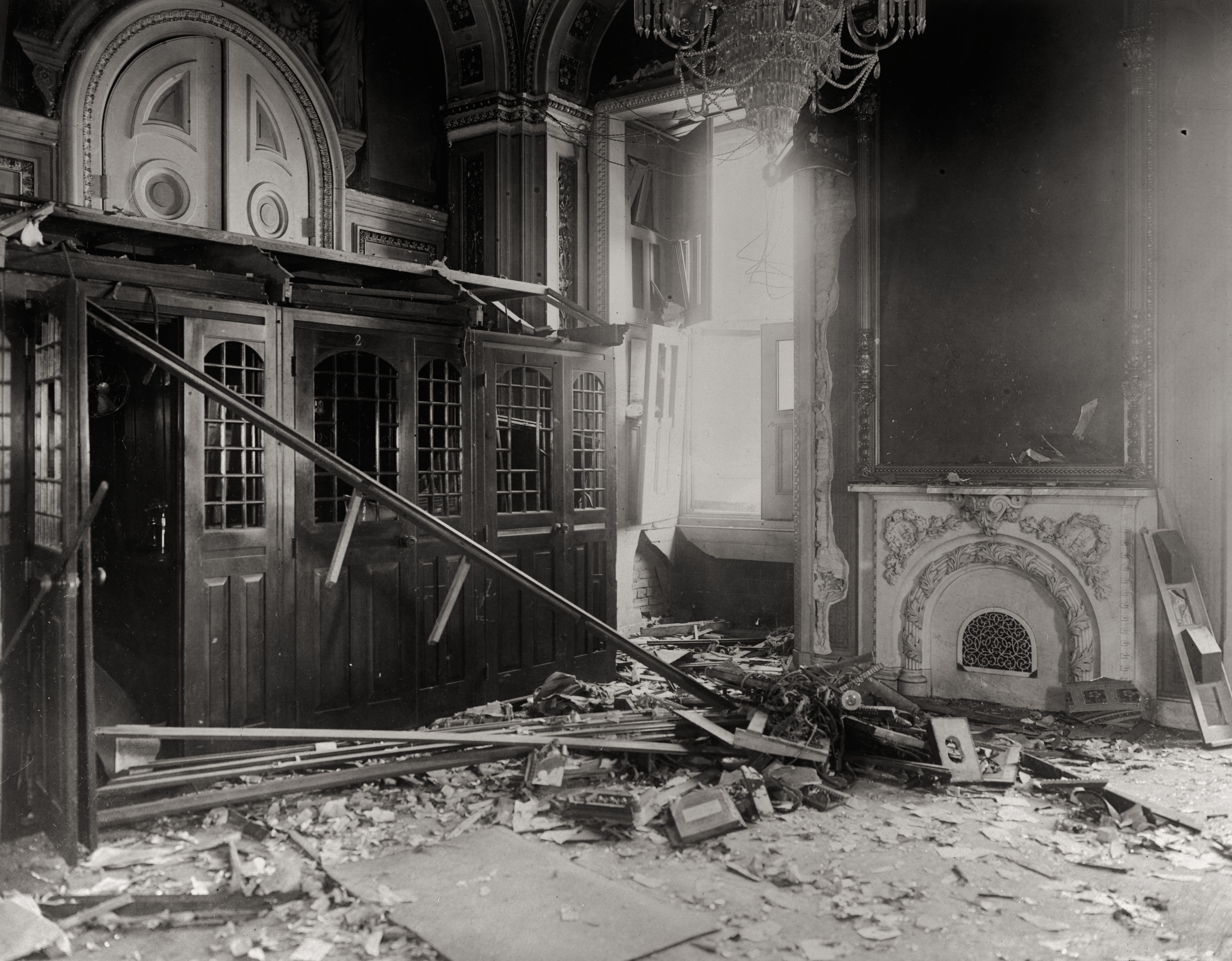
The bombed Senate reception room

Muenter began a campaign against the United States and finance capital on July 2, 1915, by hiding a package containing three sticks of dynamite with a timing mechanism set for nearly midnight under a telephone switchboard in the Senate reception room in the United States Capitol, Washington, D.C. His original target had been the Senate chamber, which he found locked. The bomb exploded at approximately 11:40 pm, resulting in no casualties. Muenter wrote a letter to The Washington Star under a pseudonym R. Pearce, explaining his actions, which was published after the bombing. He said he hoped the explosion would "make enough noise to be heard above the voices that clamor for war. This explosion is an exclamation point in my appeal for peace."

=== SS Minnehaha steamship bomb attack ===
After setting off the bomb in the Capitol, he fled to New York City. Here, he placed a pencil bomb timed explosive aboard the SS Minnehaha, a ship loaded with munitions bound for Britain. Muenter's bomb exploded, setting off a fire, though the explosion did not reach the munitions and caused minimal damage to the ship itself.

=== Shooting of J. P. Morgan Jr. ===
Under the alias of Frank Holt, Muenter took a train and a cab to the East Island, Glen Cove, New York, estate of J. P. Morgan Jr., known as Matinecock Point, on July 3, 1915. J.P. Morgan & Co. was acting as the American purchasing agent for the British and French governments, as well as arranging large loans to both governments. Muenter carried a small suitcase with newspaper clippings against arms shipments, and a few sticks of dynamite, while in his coat he carried two revolvers and another stick of dynamite. Muenter rang the front doorbell. When the butler opened the door, Muenter presented a business card and demanded to see Mr. Morgan. When the butler balked after he would not state his business, Muenter pulled out both revolvers and ran into the house looking for Morgan. When he encountered two of Morgan's children, he pointed a pistol at them and had them follow. On the staircase, he shouted "Now, Mr. Morgan, I have you!" as Mrs. Morgan tried to block the path to her husband, but Morgan lunged at his attacker and tackled Muenter to the ground as he fired two rounds into Morgan's groin and thigh. He fired twice more but the caps failed to detonate. Having pinned Muenter to the ground, Morgan twisted one revolver out of Muenter's hand as his wife and others grabbed the other. Muenter was heard to cry "Kill me! Kill me now! I don't want to live anymore. I have been in a perfect hell for the last six months on account of the European war." Morgan's butler finished subduing Muenter, beating him senseless with a lump of coal. Morgan recovered quickly, returning to work on August 14.

Muenter refused to identify himself to police, saying only that he was a Christian gentleman who wanted to persuade Morgan to end the war. However, a tip was soon received pointing out a resemblance between "Holt" and Muenter, who was still wanted in Cambridge for the poisoning of his wife. Harvard official Charles Apted, who had lived near Muenter in Cambridge, was dispatched to New York, where he identified Muenter.

In his jacket he had written down the names of Morgan's four children, and a clipped cartoon of Lady Liberty pointing to a crate of fireworks, representing the European war, telling Uncle Sam that they are "dangerous fireworks". He also circled some sailings on a schedule for merchant vessels leaving New York. He told police that his original intention was to take Morgan's wife and children hostage to force Morgan to help stop munitions shipments to Europe, though on at least one occasion he admitted he also intended to assassinate Morgan. Authorities quickly connected him to the Capitol bombings and the wife poisoning case. A search of the suitcase found a handwritten letter addressed to "His Majesty the German Kaiser" similar to letters he mailed out at the time of the bombing of the Capitol signed "R. Pearce". The Morgan shooting made world headlines the next Sunday morning, July 4.

=== Bomb-making materials ===
Captain Thomas J. Tunney, head of New York City Police Department's Bomb Squad, tricked Muenter into confessing details how he had made the timer for the Capitol bomb, but he would not tell all until July 7. Police tracked down a trunk Muenter had placed in storage in New York City. Inspector of Combustibles Owen Egan declared it "the greatest equipment for bomb making ever brought to New York" with 134 sticks of dynamite, blasting caps, coils of fuse, batteries, nitric acid, windproof matches, mercury fulminate, smokeless explosive powder. Three explosive tin can bombs had been recently completed.

=== Death ===
There is some dispute on how Muenter died on July 6, 1915. Muenter tried to kill himself on the night of July 5 by slashing his wrist but this failed to kill him. An investigation ruled the death a suicide. New York's counterterrorism police at first believed that he was killed by an assassin sent to silence him with two bullets in the head. But the version they decided on was that Muenter ran out of a briefly opened door and jumped head-first onto the concrete floor of the jail corridor, falling 20 feet or about 6.1 meters. The supposed bullet wounds were actually injuries sustained during his attack on Morgan's family. The sound of his head hitting the concrete was so loud that it was initially thought he had smuggled a dynamite cap into the prison and set it off with his teeth.

=== Bombing after his death ===
Muenter's second wife received a note from her husband warning that a ship bound for England would sink on July 7. On that day, just two days after his suicide, the crew was warned but they could not find the bomb on the SS Minnehaha. It exploded, but had been placed far away from the munitions and caused minor damage.

== See also ==
- List of incidents of political violence in Washington, D.C.
