= Charles R. Apted =

Harvard University official

"Colonel" Charles R. Apted
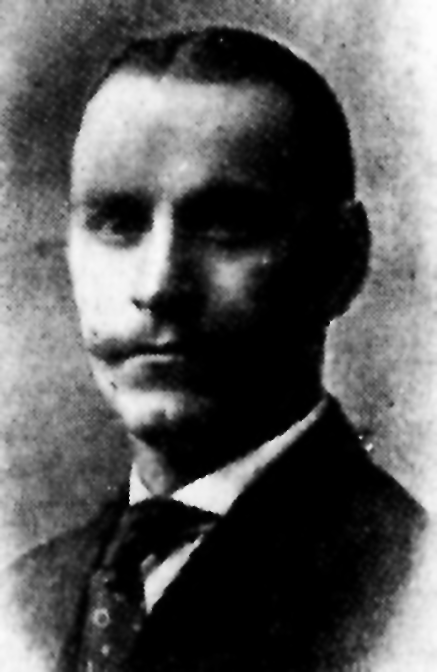
- Apted in 1918
- Born: June 18, 1873; Boston
- Died: June 5, 1941 (aged 67); Cambridge, Massachusetts
- Education: Chelsea Public Schools
- Occupations: Chief, Harvard Yard police · Supt. of Harvard buildings · Cambridge City Councillor
- Employer: Harvard University
- Title: "Harvard Cop No. 1"
- Spouse: Eva Catherine (Hunt) Apted
- Parent(s): Henry Edmund Apted; Maria Chesterman

Charles Robert Apted (1873–1941) was for 39 years a Harvard University official in various capacities, for much of that time chief of the Harvard Yard police ("Harvard Cop No. 1", the Boston Globe called him) and superintendent of Harvard buildings. His Boston Globe obituary called him "both feared and beloved by undergraduates during three university presidential administrations".

He gained national prominence in 1915, when he identified deranged former Harvard German instructor and wife-poisoner Eric Muenter as the dynamite-wielding intruder who had shot J. P. Morgan Jr. and bombed the US Senate.

== Background ==
Apted was born in Boston of English-immigrant parents, and worked for a time in insurance. He married Eva C. Hunt on June 16, 1898.

He was elected to the Cambridge, Massachusetts "common council" in 1914, and to the city council (under a new city charter) in 1915 or 1916. In his first three years in office he was "chairman of every social event of the city council", and was for many years grand chancellor of the Knights of Pythias.

== Harvard career ==
He began at Harvard in 1902 as a clerk in the office of the Supervisor of Caretaking. "Old Harvard grads remember him for the sympathetic help he gave some of the poorer students [when] he had charge of the Furniture Loan Department", said The New York Times. By 1921 he was Supervisor of Caretaking (later Superintendent of Buildings) himself, and by his retirement in 1941 four hundred Harvard staff were under his supervision, including twenty-two "yard cops".

His duties included oversight of the Harvard Police Patrol. In this capacity he was "both guardian and disciplinarian", keeping student misbehavior under control within Harvard's confines‍—‌"His cry of 'Break it up' as he headed for the focal point of any riot or disturbance became famous in the annals of the College"‍—‌and extricated Harvard "boys" from trouble with authorities outside the school's gates. "With police forces for miles around 'Charlie's' word was as good as bail", said The Harvard Crimson. The "mild-mannered, bespectacled" Apted also protected students in trouble‍—‌especially those from prominent families‍—‌from publicity; in 1932 the City Council criticized him for refusing to reveal the names of participants in a riot, which had grown from the serenading of Radcliffe women to trash fires and an assault on a police station.

External images
- Apted with the Sacred Cod, which he had recovered from "Codnappers"
- "Showing how [Apted] protects Harvard students when they get into trouble ..."
- Apted examining "a hammer arranged as substitute to keep Memorial Hall bell ringing, after the 60-pound clapper had vanished. Some students believe Yale undergraduates might know clapper's whereabouts."

In 1933 it was into his hands that the so-called Sacred Cod‍—‌the emblem of the Commonwealth of Massachusetts "codnapped" days earlier from the Massachusetts State House‍—‌was delivered by two young men at a late-night rendezvous, to which he had been directed by a mysterious telephone call. Following his "single-handed recovery of the emblem ... after both city and state police had been baffled at every turn", the Crimson reported that he had been "advanced to the rank of Colonel in the Yard Police", adding that his rise had been "meteoric. Ranked as Captain a year ago, he was advanced to the title of Major as a result of his work in the famous Memorial Hall clapper case last spring." (The "ranks" were unofficial, bestowed by the student body as a sign of affection. On his retirement the Crimson nominated him to become "the first full General in Harvard history.")

When Harvard athletes were suspected in the March 1934 disappearance of Yale's "ugly bulldog mascot", Handsome Dan, (Note: Untitled. Vol. 36. 1934. p. 730.) Yale officials asked Apted to find it. He delivered it some days later to Yale's New Haven, Connecticut, campus, though not before the Lampoon photographed Handsome Dan licking the boots of the John Harvard statue, which had been smeared with hamburger. ("Dog licks man", a Crimson headline read.) (Note: At one point during the affair certain Yale students‍—‌suspecting that editors of the Harvard Lampoon were also involved, and wanting a hostage they might trade for their dog‍—‌attempted to kidnap the Lampoon's president and "Ibis" (vice-president). The attempt failed when the intended victims managed to summon assistance via police whistles they had taken to carrying as a precautionary measure. It was rumored that Handsome Dan's disappearance was part of a series of tit-for-tat thefts by Harvard and Yale students in alternation, and in November the Lampoon exploited this rumor in a "carefully planned publicity scheme" promoting an upcoming special issue of their magazine: "a series of telegrams ... conveyed the [news] that practically all the magazines had been stolen", with the implication that the robbery was in retaliation for the Handsome Dan theft. "The metropolitan papers gave the affair wide publicity, and made the [theft] almost a national calamity, only to get word finally from Harvard that the issue had mysteriously been returned ... It later appeared that the robbery was a mere hoax ... but so well did the plan work that a tremendous number of sales were made over the weekend, and one batch of 2,000 copies was disposed of in 15 minutes." The disappearance of the Harvard Band's giant bass drum, on the eve of the annual Harvard-Yale football game later that month, was similarly rumored to be revenge for Handsome Dan.)

More serious matters investigated by Apted over the years included Prohibition-era bootlegging; illegal gambling; a rash of defacements of donors' portraits, death threats against Harvard President A. Lawrence Lowell during his involvement in the Sacco-Vanzetti case; an attempted bombing of Harvard Yard's old communal water pump; and the theft of thousands of Harvard library books by a former graduate student. In an extortion racket smashed in 1938, two "young and good looking" girls ("one being a blonde and the other a redhead") lured their freshman victims to a Brighton, Massachusetts apartment, then demanded "financial assistance" in return for not alleging to Harvard officials that improprieties had ensued. (Note: Around this same time, a student received an envelope containing "a picture of a disrobed female reposing on a bench", together with a letter reading, "Remember the Riviera or was it Revere? Five thousand dollars ... OR ELSE." Fearing the signature, "Bev, the clutch", was that of "a notorious Harvard Square and Huntington Avenue blackmailer", he turned over the letter (and, "reluctantly", the photograph) to Apted. The letter was determined to be a hoax.)

In 1915 a "Frank Holt" was subdued by a butler armed with a lump of coal after shooting financier J. P. Morgan Jr. at Morgan's Glen Cove, New York home; he quickly confessed to planting the bomb which had wrecked a United States Senate reception room the day before. Soon a tip was received pointing out a resemblance between "Holt" and Eric Muenter, a Harvard German instructor who had disappeared in 1906 after poisoning his pregnant wife with arsenic. Apted (who had lived near Muenter in Cambridge) was dispatched to New York, where he identified Muenter, who soon after committed suicide. "The newspapers had a field day with Morgan, the Capitol, Harvard and murder all in one story," the Crimson wrote years later.

== Retirement ==
Though not a Harvard graduate, Apted felt "as much like one as all the Lowells and Quincys and Adamses and Kirklands together", and was an honorary member of the class of 1906 after enrolling in two architecture courses that year. "The list of students with whom 'Charlie' was acquainted reads like a Who's Who," said the Crimson. "Franklin Roosevelt, for instance, and 'all his damn kids.' Then there is Leverett Saltonstall, Felix Frankfurter, Robert Benchley, Arthur Holcombe, Joe Kennedy, Archy Davison, and [Harvard President] 'Jim' Conant" (whom Apted once called "a good boy"). "The world would be surprised if they knew, as I do, the various stunts pulled at Harvard by some of the biggest men in the country," he said.

A 1940 dinner in his honor‍—‌"in Harvard's paneled old Memorial Hall [at which] 600 Harvard men dined and wined him [and] the Harvard Glee Club sang 'Behold the Lord High Executioner'" (though with Executioner changed to Protector)‍—‌was reported in Time magazine's Education section and The New York Times. Scheduled speakers included Massachusetts Governor Leverett Saltonstall, Attorney General Paul A. Dever, Harvard Presidents Conant and (emeritus) A. Lawrence Lowell, as well as a senator, two judges, and the mayor of Cambridge. At the dinner he announced that had made definite planes to retire "in the near future".

In February 1941 the Crimson reported that Apted intended to publish his memoirs, but he died on June 5. His front-page Boston Globe obituary said:

Long after the memories of other college officials had dimmed into the past, Harvard men remembered "Col." Apted. He was both feared and beloved by undergraduates during three university presidential administrations, and he was the subject of more class day anecdotes, probably, than even such other traditional Harvard characters as Profs. Charles Townsend Copeland and George Lyman Kittredge.

== See also ==
- "Rinehart!" – Harvard student "battle cry"
