= Matinecock Point =

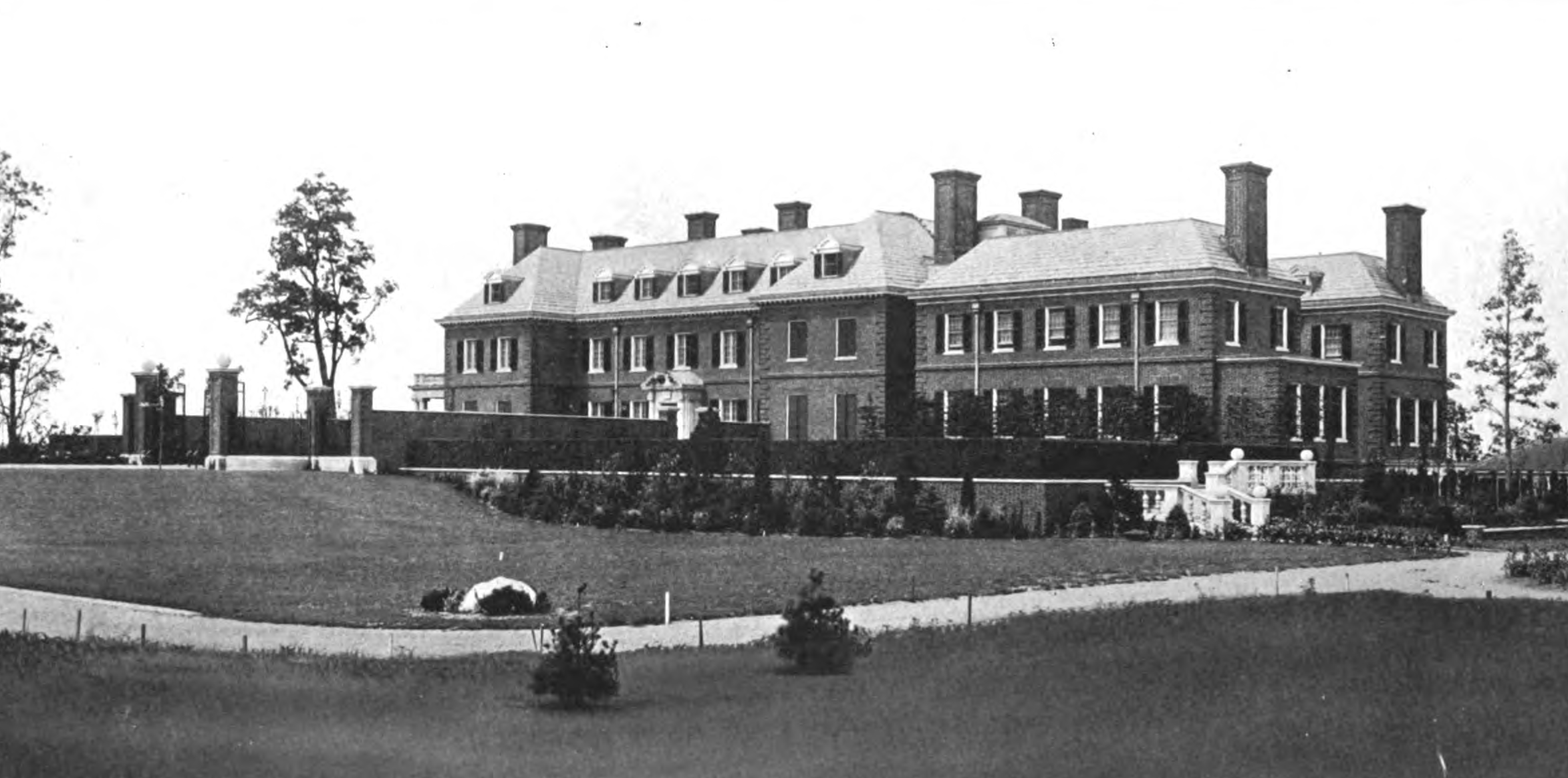
- Matinecock Point in February 1913.
- Interactive map of the Matinecock Point area

General information
- Type: House
- Architectural style: Georgian Colonial
- Location: East Island in Glen Cove, Long Island, New York
- Coordinates: 40°53.62′N 73°38.13′W
- Construction started: 1909
- Completed: 1913
- Demolished: 1980

Design and construction
- Architect: Christopher Grant LaFarge

Matinecock Point was a 57-room Neo-Georgian home on East Island in Glen Cove, Long Island. The home was designed by architect Christopher Grant LaFarge for Jack Morgan of the Morgan banking family. The original estate of 140 acres was particularly noted for its magnificent gardens and the mile-long tree-lined driveway that burst to life in Spring with daffodils.

Jack Morgan, the only son of J.P. Morgan, purchased the estate in 1909 from the heirs of the late Leonard Jacob, a native of the Isle of Wight. Morgan hired Christopher Grant LaFarge of the architectural firm, LaFarge & Morris, to build his 57-room (plus 18-bathrooms) home, which served as his principal residence, and construction was completed in 1913. It had 14-foot ceilings, reception rooms that each measured roughly thirty feet by thirty, marble fireplaces and sinks, carved moldings, a small gymnasium, and secret panels hidden in several walls. LaFarge also laid out stables, cottages, outbuildings plus an extensive farm complex for Morgan's prize-winning herd of Blue Ribbon Jersey cattle, chickens, and hothouse flowers. The gardens were planted with all sorts of exotic trees and flowers, and even up until the 1970s orange trees could still be found on the lawns. Taken as a whole, the bill for the construction of the Matinecock Point estate came in at $2.5 million.

== Assassination attempt ==
In 1913, Jack Morgan, succeeded his father as the head of J.P. Morgan & Co., and he used his friendship with the British ambassador to the United States, Cecil Spring-Rice, to secure a deal for his firm to become the sole munitions and supplies purchaser for the British and French governments throughout World War I. In July, 1915, Morgan was entertaining Cecil Spring-Rice at Matinecock when a man forced his way past the butler and in through the front door. Morgan and Rice threw themselves on the intruder who was bearing two guns and had several sticks of dynamite inside his jacket. In the struggle, two shots went off catching Morgan in the hip and the abdomen.

The would-be assassin was Eric Muenter, a former German professor at Harvard University who was already wanted in Massachusetts for the murder of his pregnant wife. He maintained he had only wanted to take Morgan's wife and children hostage until Morgan arranged the end of the war, but this didn't tally with his other actions which included exploding a bomb that destroyed a reception room at the U.S. Senate, fortunately without injury.

== After Jack Morgan's death ==
By the time Jack died in 1943, the estate had been reduced to 73-acres. He left it in equal shares to his two sons, Junius and Henry. most of his servants remained on the estate and in the mansion itself there continued to live, "two British refugee children and a nurse and governess". Presumably having made arrangements for those living there, the following year the Morgan brothers sold it for a mere fraction of what it had cost to build. In 1944, Joseph Miller, a Beverly Hills real estate developer, bought it from the Morgans for $120,000 before flipping it on just a matter of weeks later for $175,000 to Philip Publicker, of Philadelphia.

Publicker planned to maintain the mansion and 25-acres of gardens before subdividing the remaining land for a housing development. While he battled with planning restrictions, he leased the mansion to the Soviet Union as a retreat for between 60 and 80 Russian diplomats serving with the United Nations. The move was not looked upon favorably by the island's other residents.

In the meantime, Publicker's plans for development had hit a brick wall and after he failed to pay a $26,000 tax bill in 1949, the property was taken over by the City of Glen Cove. In 1950, the estate was put on the auction block and although the Soviet Union was the highest bidder, their bid was blocked by Morgan's lawyers who eventually donated the estate to the Sisters of St. John the Baptist. In the meantime, it sat empty when it was discovered that: "Inside the house imported velour draperies hang in tatters, damask wall coverings have been pulled off and gold leaf framing and embossed panels have been marred".

The remaining land was partially developed during the 1950s and the nuns remained there until 1971. That year they placed it on the market for a million dollars, having agreed with the 80 families living on the island that they would not sell to any commercial or institutional buyers. The nuns stuck to their words, but after knocking the price down to $850,000, the buyers ran it to ruin. What remained of the land was broken and sold off piece by piece, until only the run down old mansion was left standing. Still too well-constructed to be taken down by a wrecking ball, it was brought down with dynamite.

Today, the backyards of three modest suburban homes occupy the land on which Jack Morgan's mansion once stood, but the dairy complex and several cottages still stand, as Morgan's lasting legacy to the island he called home for thirty years.
