= Walter M. Brackett =

American painter

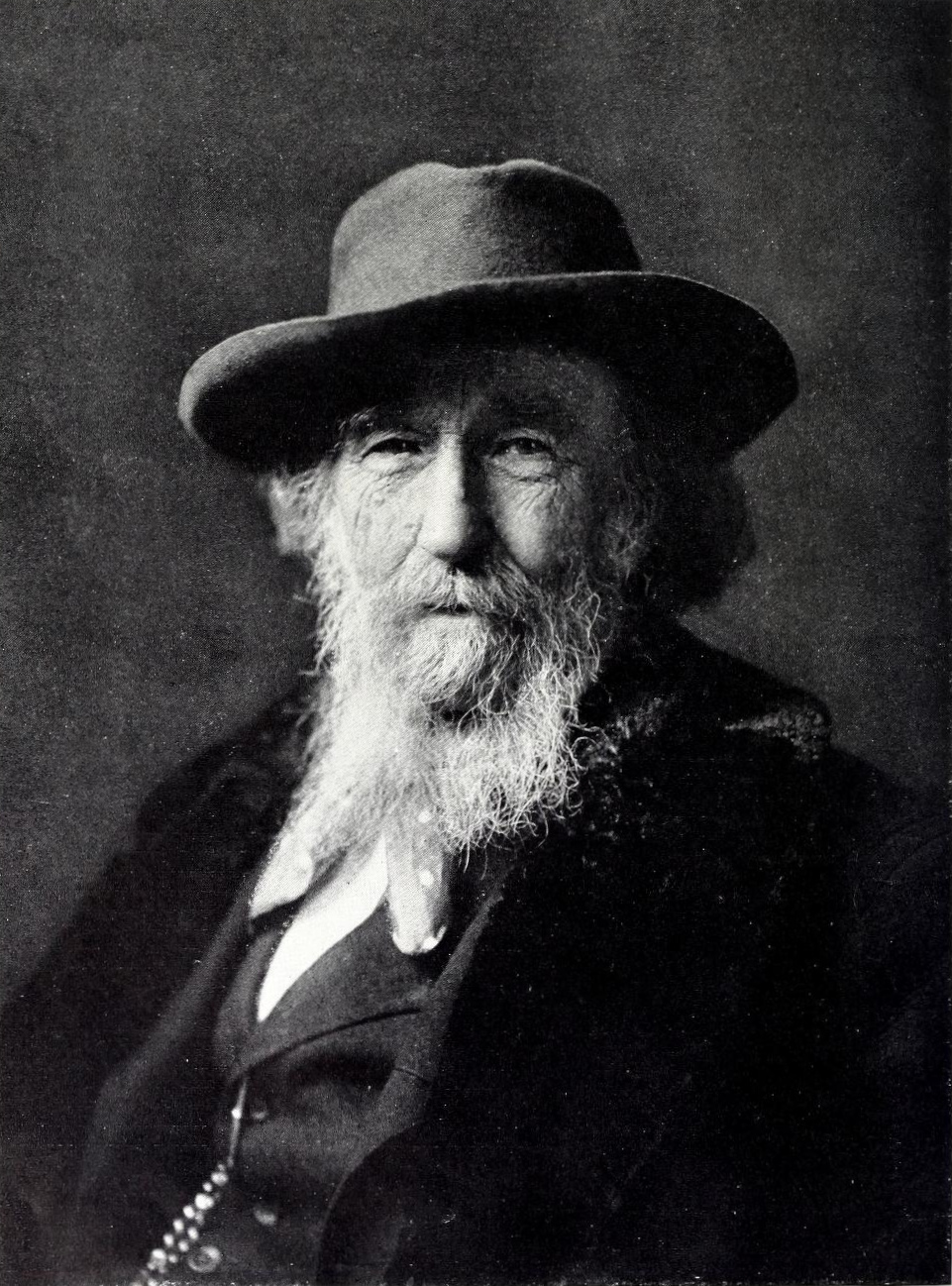
Walter M. Brackett, c. 1908

Walter M. Brackett (June 14, 1823 – March 4, 1919), was an American painter and the younger brother of sculptor Edward A. Brackett. Brackett was born in Unity, Maine. He spent most of his professional career in Boston, Massachusetts, exhibiting his work at the Boston Athenaeum, the Apollo Association, and the National Academy of Design. He was one of the artists engaged by Secretary of War William W. Belknap in the early 1870s to execute portraits of the line of succession of the secretaries, and he painted the portraits of Timothy Pickering, Samuel Dexter, William Eustis, and Henry Dearborn, all prominent residents of his native state. He was also a noted painter of fish, and was tasked with repainting the Sacred Cod of Massachusetts in 1898.

Brackett died in Boston on March 4, 1919.
