= Lafayette Mulligan =

Perpetrated Hoax

Lafayette Mulligan was a name under which hoaxes were perpetrated in Boston in the 1920s and 1930s.

In one such incident in 1924, "Mulligan"‍—‌purportedly writing on behalf of mayor James Michael Curley‍—‌sent Edward, Prince of Wales (later Edward VIII) a key to the heavily Irish Catholic city of Boston and invited him to visit as Curley's guest. Eddie Collins, a Boston Globe reporter, was credited with the hoax. After the Prince visited Boston as the guest of Bayard Tuckerman Jr., "Mulligan" sent Tuckerman a key.

In 1933, the "codnappers" of the Sacred Cod from the Massachusetts State House (the editors of the Harvard Lampoon) ended their phone message to Mayor Curley with "Lafayette Mulligan, we are here."
