= Sacred Cod =

Wooden effigy in Massachusetts, United States

Coordinates: 42°21′29.4″N 71°3′49.3″W

The Sacred Cod
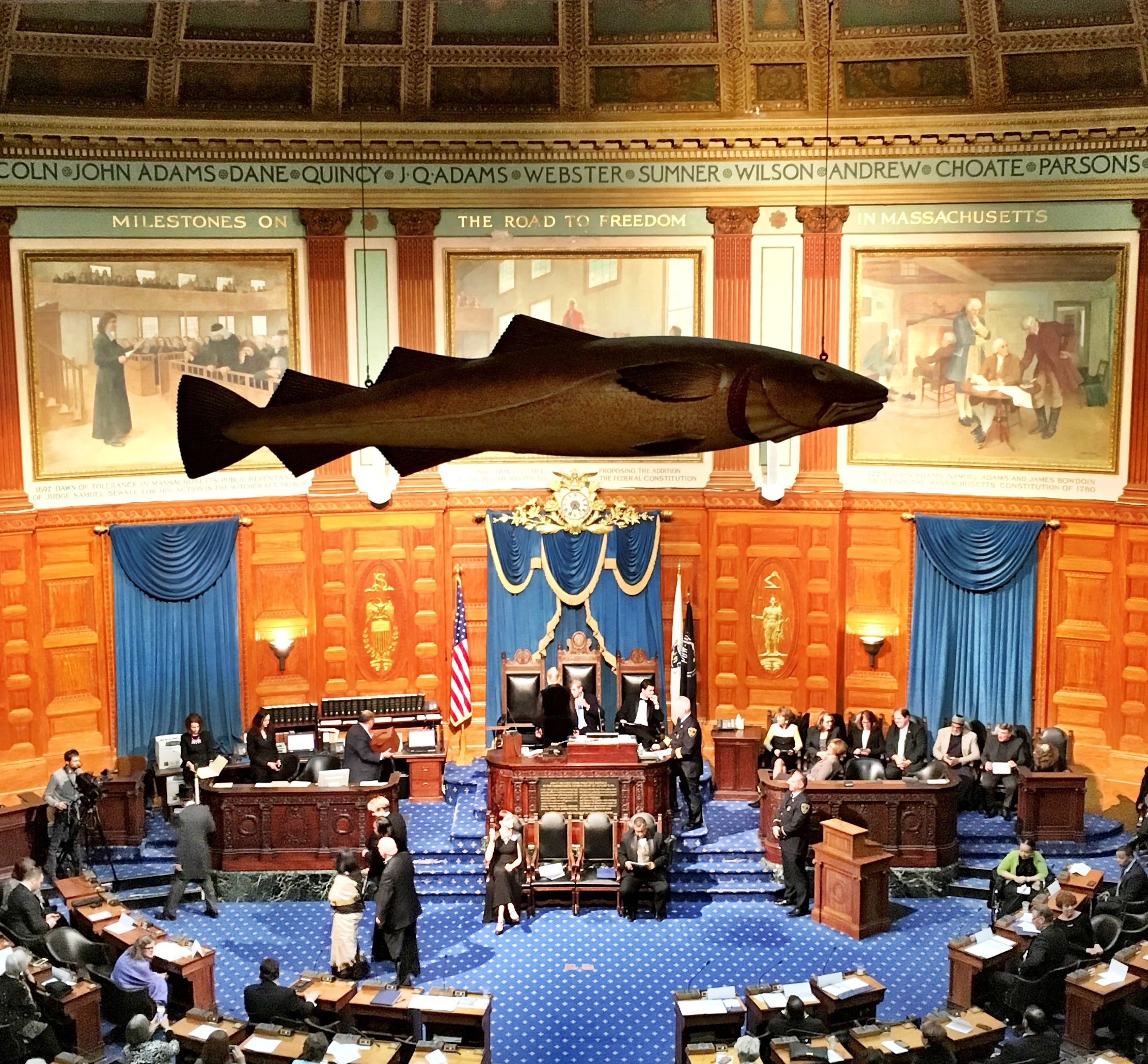
- The Sacred Cod in its "natural habitat". "Humble the subject and homely the design; yet this painted image bears on its finny front a majesty greater than the dignity that art can lend to graven gold or chiselled marble", said an 1895 paean by Massachusetts legislators.^{[C]}
- Year: 1784
- Medium: Woodcarving
- Dimensions: 4 ft 11 in (150 cm) long
- Weight: 80 lb (36 kg)
- Location: Massachusetts State House, Boston

The Sacred Cod is a four-foot-eleven-inch (150 cm) carved-wood effigy of an Atlantic codfish, painted to the life, hanging in the House of Representatives chamber of Boston's Massachusetts State House‍—‌"a memorial of the importance of the Cod-Fishery to the welfare of this Commonwealth" (i.e. Massachusetts, of which cod is officially the "historic and continuing symbol"). (Note: General Court of the Commonwealth of Massachusetts. "Ch. 2 §13". Massachusetts General Law. General Court of the Commonwealth of Massachusetts.) The Sacred Cod has gone through as many as three incarnations over three centuries: the first (if it really existed‍—‌the authoritative source calling it a "prehistoric creature of tradition") was lost in a 1747 fire; the second disappeared during the American Revolution; and the third, installed in 1784, is the one seen in the House chamber today.

"Sacred Cod" is not a formal name but a nickname which appeared in 1895, soon after the carving was termed "the sacred emblem" by a House committee appointed "to investigate the significance of the emblem [which] has kept its place under all administrations, and has looked upon outgoing and incoming legislative assemblies, for more than one hundred years".^{[C]} Soon sacred cod was being used in reference to actual codfish as well, in recognition of the creature's role in building Massachusetts's prosperity and influence since early colonial times.

In 1933 the Sacred Cod was briefly "Cod-napped" by editors of the Harvard Lampoon, prompting police to drag the Charles River and search an airplane landing in New Jersey. In 1968 it was again taken briefly, this time by students at the University of Massachusetts Boston.

A fish figure is displayed in the State House Senate chamber as well‍—‌a brass casting (sometimes called the Holy Mackerel) above its central chandelier.

== Significance ==
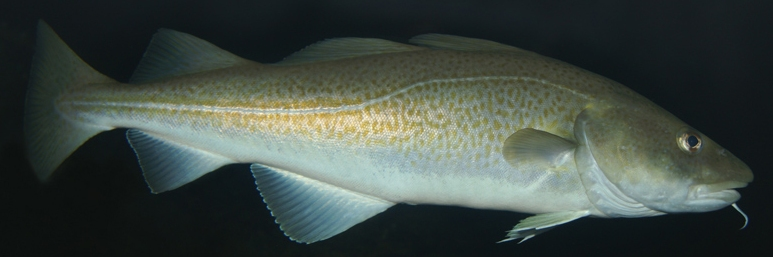
A "sacred cod" in its natural habitat

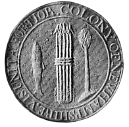
Seal of New Hampshire, 1776

Years before the statesmen of the period had decided to make public acknowledgement of the indebtedness of the colony to the codfish, and had voted to adorn the assembly chamber with a wooden representation thereof, individuals and private corporations were eager to pay tribute to the codfish, and vied with one another in their anxiety to make the recognition as conspicuous as possible.

— A History of the Emblem of the Codfish in the Hall of the House of Representatives. Compiled by a Committee of the House. (1895)

Codfishing was the first industry practiced by Europeans in Massachusetts, and it is said that the colony's first export was a cargo of fish.^{[C]} Thus the codfish has been an important New England symbol for centuries, its image appearing on many early coins, stamps, corporate and government seals, and insignia such as the early crest of the Salem Gazette. In 1743 a prominent Salem businessman built a mansion in which "the end of every stair in his spacious hall [displayed] a carved and gilded codfish", ^{[C]} and in the 19th century the nouveau riche merchant families of New England were sometimes referred to, disparagingly, as the "codfish aristocracy".

In the late 1920s an "amusing" (as author H. P. Lovecraft termed it) codfish emblem appeared briefly, "totem-like", on Massachusetts license plates. (Note: "Chris Woodcock's Massachusetts License Plates".)

== History ==
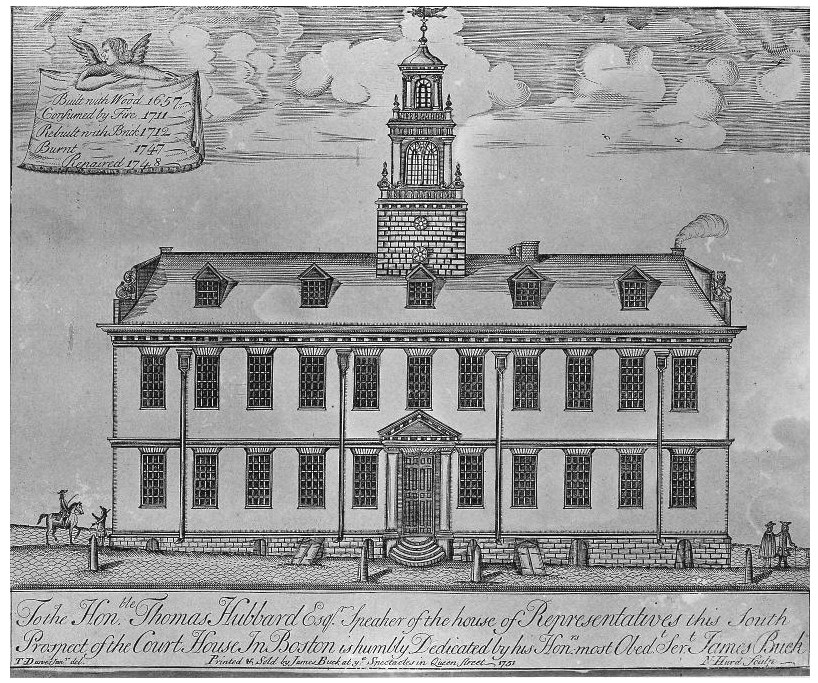
Boston's Old State House, home of the second and (for a time) the third Sacred Cod

Poised high aloft the old hall of the Massachusetts House of Representatives, riding serenely the sound waves of debate, unperturbed by the ebb and flow of enactment and repeal or the desultory storms that vexed the nether depths of oratory, there has hung through immemorial years an ancient codfish, quaintly wrought in wood and painted to the life.

Humble the subject and homely the design; yet this painted image bears on its finny front a majesty greater than the dignity that art can lend to graven gold or chiselled marble. The sphere it fills is vaster than that through which its prototype careered with all the myriad tribes of the great deep. The lessons that may be learned of it are nobler than any to be drawn from what is beautiful; for this sedate and solitary fish is instinct with memories and prophecy, like an oracle. It swims symbolic in that wider sea whose confines are the limits set to the activities of human thought. It typifies to the citizens of the Commonwealth and of the world the founding of a State. It commemorates Democracy. It celebrates the rise of free institutions. It emphasizes progress. It epitomizes Massachusetts.

— A History of the Emblem of the Codfish in the Hall of the House of Representatives. Compiled by a Committee of the House. (1895)

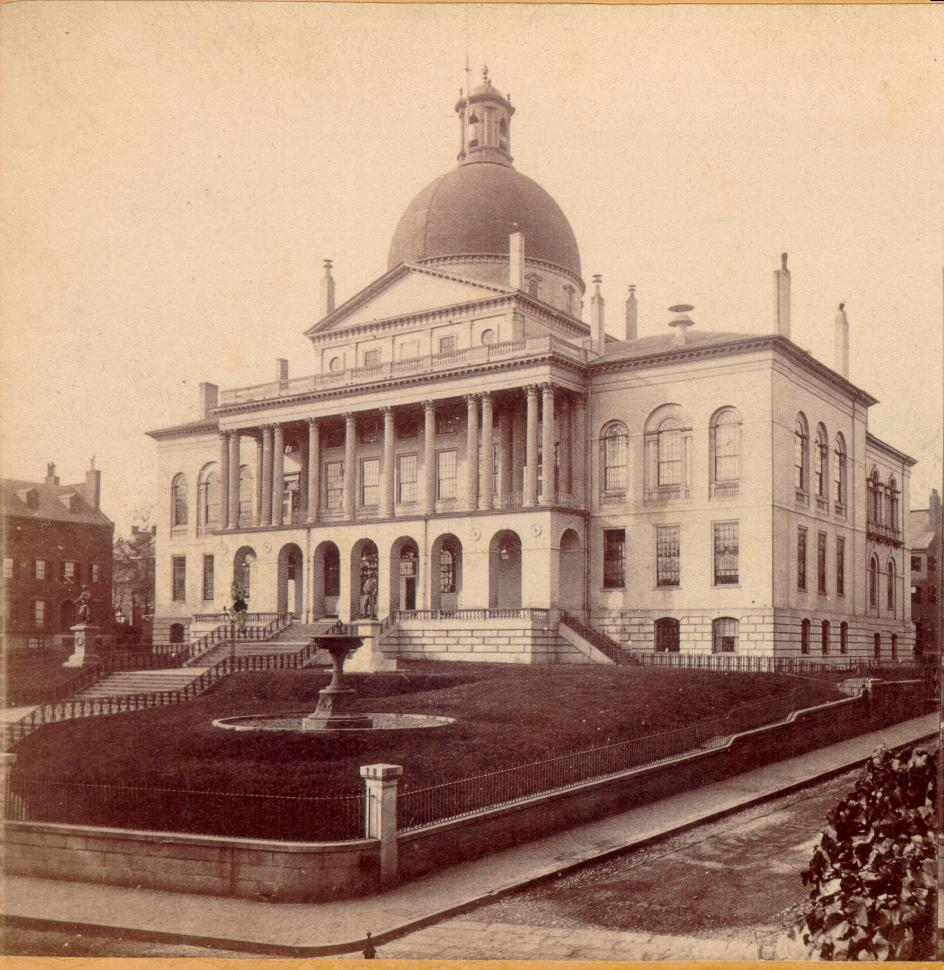
The modern Massachusetts State House (seen here c. 1862), where the third Sacred Cod hangs in the Representatives chamber.

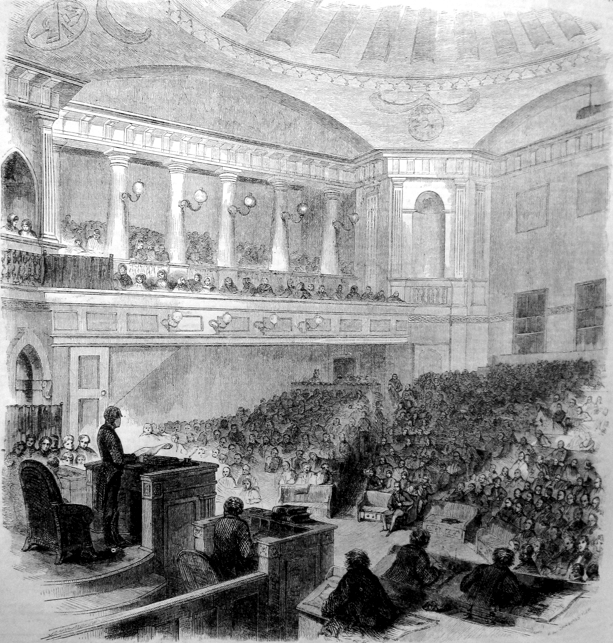
Etching (Ballou's Pictorial, 1856) of the old Representatives (now Senate) chamber, with the Sacred Cod near upper right

What is now called the Sacred Cod has hung for three centuries‍—‌though with interruptions, and in at least two (and possibly three) successive incarnations‍—‌in the chamber of the Massachusetts House of Representatives (or its predecessor, the House of Assembly of the Province of Massachusetts Bay).

=== First Cod ===
Of the Cod's first incarnation, the Committee on History of the Emblem of the Codfish (appointed by the House in 1895) wrote:

There is a dim tradition that in the primitive House of Assembly of the Province there hung a codfish which was the gift of Judge Samuel Sewall [who] died in 1729. [But Sewell's] published remains make no mention of this traditional fish, and it is difficult to imagine that a man of his loquacious verbosity would have omitted to chronicle his munificence.^{[C]}

Assuming it existed and whatever its origin (the Committee continued), when Boston's Old State House burned in 1747 "this prehistoric creature of tradition ... doubtless went up in a whirl of smoke which still clouds its history to the peering vision of the antiquarian". ^{[C]}

=== Second Cod ===
A second Cod appeared sometime between 1748 (when the State House was rebuilt) and 1773 (when Thomas Crafts Jr. billed the Province of Massachusetts Bay, "To painting Codfish, 15 shillings"). But within a few years, the Committee wrote, the second Cod

disappeared from the State House and was doubtless destroyed, for the closest historical research fails to shed any light upon the time, manner or cause of its disappearance, or to disclose any reference to it whatever. Mayhap some burly British trooper, quartered in the improvised barracks of the old State House [during the siege of Boston], took umbrage at the spick and span elegance of the newly painted emblem of colonial independence and thrift. Such a one may have torn down the cherished symbol from the wall whence it had offered aid and comfort to the rebel patriots, with its assurance of the material wealth accessible to the embryonic State, and, in spirit of vandalism so prevalent at that age, used it to replenish his evening camp fire.^{[C]}

The Committee found "good reason to believe that this missing fish ... was carved by one John Welch, a Boston patriot". (Note: ^{[C]} The Committee discussed at some length whether the Cod sculpted by Welch was the second in the series, or the third: "There seems good reason to believe that this missing fish, or its successor, which has come down to us, was carved by one John Welch, a Boston patriot. Welch was born Aug. 11, 1711. He was a well-known citizen, and lived on Green Lane in West Boston. In 1756 he was a captain in the Ancient and Honorable Artillery Company. He, [like John Rowe], was one of the signers of the famous petition or memorial, charging the officers of the Crown with appropriating to their own use money belonging to the Province. The descendants of John Welch have always insisted that he carved the State House codfish of today. His great-great-grandson, Capt. Francis Welch, is now living in Brookline, at the age of eight-six, and he has recently stated that the truth of this assertion has always been recognized among the family traditions. It has been handed down from father to son uncontradicted for at least three generations. Captain Welch's father repeatedly told him that he heard the story from the lips of his grandfather, and never expressed the least doubt in regard to it. "Conceding the authenticity of this tradition, a question remains as to which of the two codfishes was the handiwork of John Welch. Welch died Feb. 9, 1789; so that, if he carved the fish now in the State House, he must have been in his seventy-fourth year. This seems unlikely, whereas he might easily have wrought the codfish Thomas Crafts [Jr.] painted; and it is quite probable that, in the growing vagueness of domestic tradition, the identity of the two may have been confounded. In that chaotic revolutionary period which left us no record of the loss or destruction of the object of Thomas Crafts' artistic attention, the Welch family may easily have lost trace of it, and have taken it for granted that the older emblem is the actual symbol of today.")

=== Third Cod ===
The third Cod was installed in 1784 (the Committee continued) after Representative John Rowe‍—‌namesake of Rowes Wharf and "a leading spirit in the stirring scenes that led up to the famous 'Boston Tea Party'" ^{[C]}‍—‌asked leave "to hang up the representation of a Cod Fish in the room where the House sit, as a memorial of the importance of the Cod-Fishery to the welfare of this Commonwealth, as had been usual formerly .... And so the emblem was suspended" in the old State House once again, and this Cod (which Rowe may have underwritten personally) is the one extant today.^{[C]}

In 1798 the Cod was moved to the Representatives chamber in the new State House,^{[C]} where it originally hung over the Speaker's desk. In the 1850s it was moved to the rear of the chamber. (Note: ^{[C]} The Committee elaborated: "In 1867, for a brief space, the fish was missing from its accustomed haunt; but it soon returned, brighter than before, in a new coat of submarine motley. Again, in 1874, while the chamber was being renovated, the codfish was taken down to be repainted; and at the time [the House's 'venerable doorkeeper'] Captain Tucker measured it, finding its length to be four feet and eleven inches. He also noted that it was carved from a solid piece of wood. Since that time, a period of twenty-one years, the sacred emblem has not been profaned by mortal touch." Additionally, the Cod was painted in December 1879 (cost: 12 shillings) by Samuel Gore, older brother of future Massachusetts governor Christopher Gore and brother-in-law of Thomas Crafts Jr.; and yet again in 1965. Another source gives the Cod's length as four feet eleven and one-half inches, and its maximum diameter as ten inches.)

=== Committee on History of the Emblem of the Codfish ===
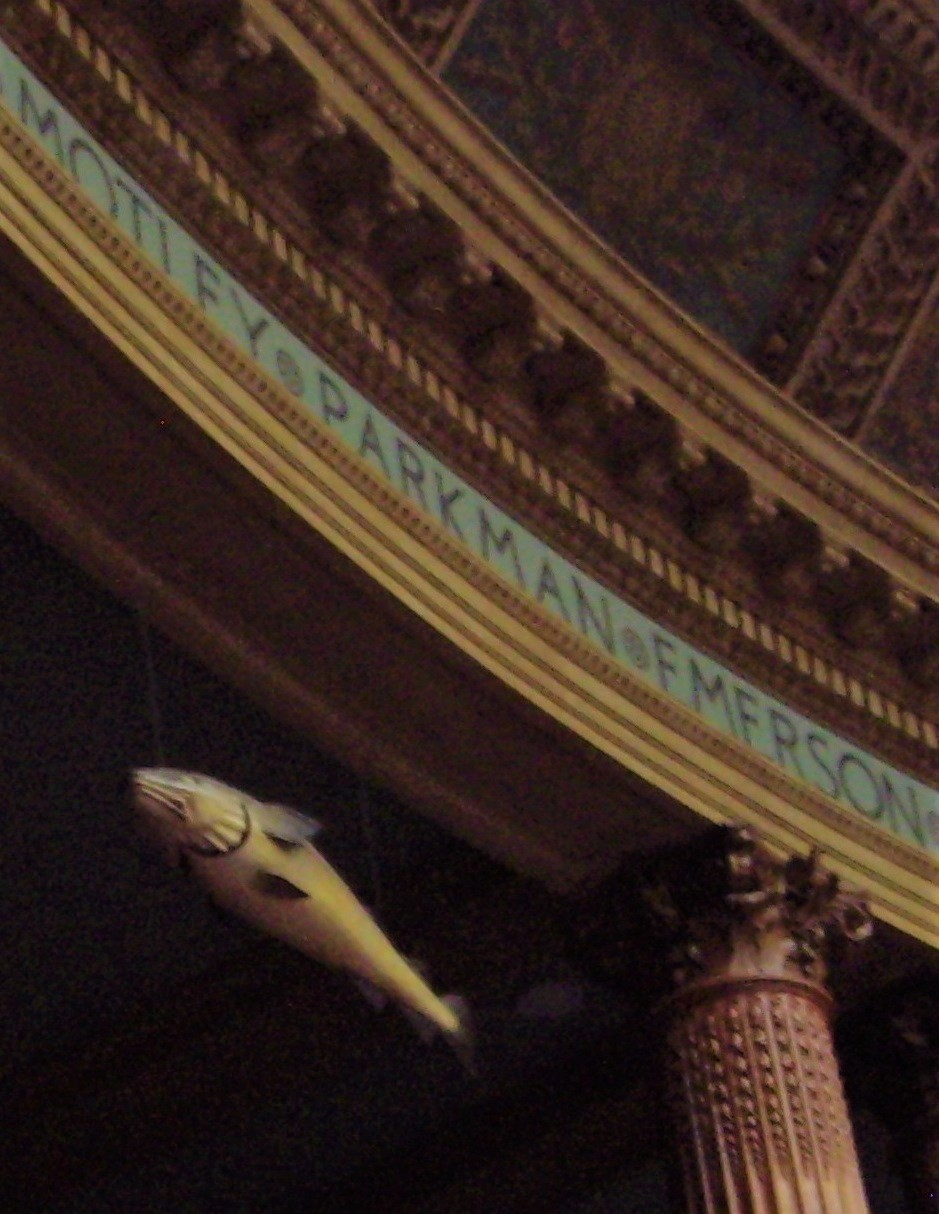
The Sacred Cod "aerially swimming" above the House of Representatives visitors' gallery (formerly the Ladies' Gallery), 2013

On January 2, 1895‍—‌the House's last day of business before relocating to a new chamber in the same building—

the question of taking with it the "representation of a codfish," which for more than a hundred years had never missed a "roll call," was brought up for consideration. It was, however, deemed wise to investigate the significance of the emblem before its removal ...

Accordingly, after "nearly two months of painstaking research and investigation" the three-member Committee on History of the Emblem of the Codfish submitted its report, and after debating "at length" the House ordered "immediate removal of the ancient 'representation of a codfish' from its present position in the chamber recently vacated by the House, and to cause it to be suspended ... in this chamber ...." ^{[C]}

A committee of fifteen was escorted by the Sergeant-at-Arms to the old House chamber, where the Sacred Cod was lowered by the assistant doorkeeper and wrapped in an American flag, then placed on a bier and borne by House messengers to the new House chamber, where the assembled Representatives rose in applause.^{[C]} After repainting by Walter M. Brackett, it was hung where it remains today: "between the two sets of central columns, and under the names 'Motley,' and 'Parkman'," ^{[C]} above the chamber's clock. (Note: The identities of "Motley" and "Parkman" are given by Burrell.)

Since that move the Cod has faced north (that is, leftward as seen from the Speaker's rostrum), though after being repainted in 1965 it was, at least temporarily, rehung the other way.

== "Sacred Cod" nickname ==
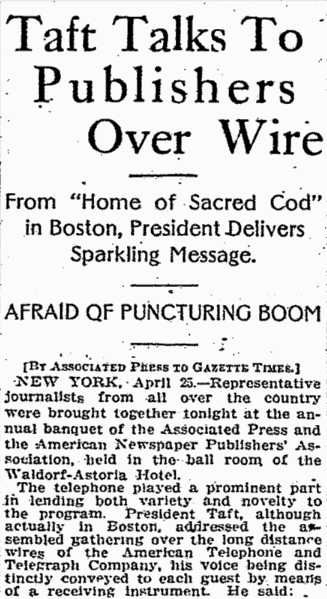
Pittsburgh Gazette Times, April 26, 1912

The Committee's report refers at one point to "the sacred emblem",^{[C]} and while it was working a poem appeared in the Boston Globe referring to the carving as "the Sacred Cod". (Note: The poem asked, rhetorically, whether "breathe there men so base, ignoble, treason-tainted / that from thy aerial throne would wrest thee, sacred sign?") Within a few years authors, journalists, and advertisers‍—‌even those far from New England‍—‌were using the term routinely. The phrase quickly came to refer not only to the wooden Cod in the State House but to actual cod from the sea as well, especially as an item of commerce. At the 1908 convention of the Retail Grocers of the United States, held in Boston, one delegate recalled

the first organized effort ... for the bettering of conditions in the grocery business. I refer to the Boston tea party. How could we get along without the Boston baked beans or the almost sacred cod?

Two years later the New Hampshire Board of Agriculture, bemoaning the counterfeiting of foodstuffs "famous for their distinctive properties or superior quality", warned that "haddock, hake, pollock, cusk, etc., are substituted indiscriminately in place of the sacred cod." In 1912 President William Howard Taft, in Boston, addressed a journalists' banquet in New York City "by long distance telephone from the home of the sacred cod". And in 1922 historian Samuel Eliot Morison, emphasizing fishing's vital role in the colonial economy, wrote that "Puritan Massachusetts derived her ideals from a sacred book; her wealth and power from the sacred cod."

The famous doggerel poking fun at Boston's Brahmins—

And this is good old Boston, / The home of the bean and the cod,
Where the Lowells talk only to Cabots / And the Cabots talk only to God.

—paraphrases an earlier poem now little remembered:

Here's to old Massachusetts / The home of the sacred cod,
Where the Adamses vote for Douglas, / And the Cabots walk with God.

== "Cod-napping" and other incidents ==
=== Harvard Lampoon ===
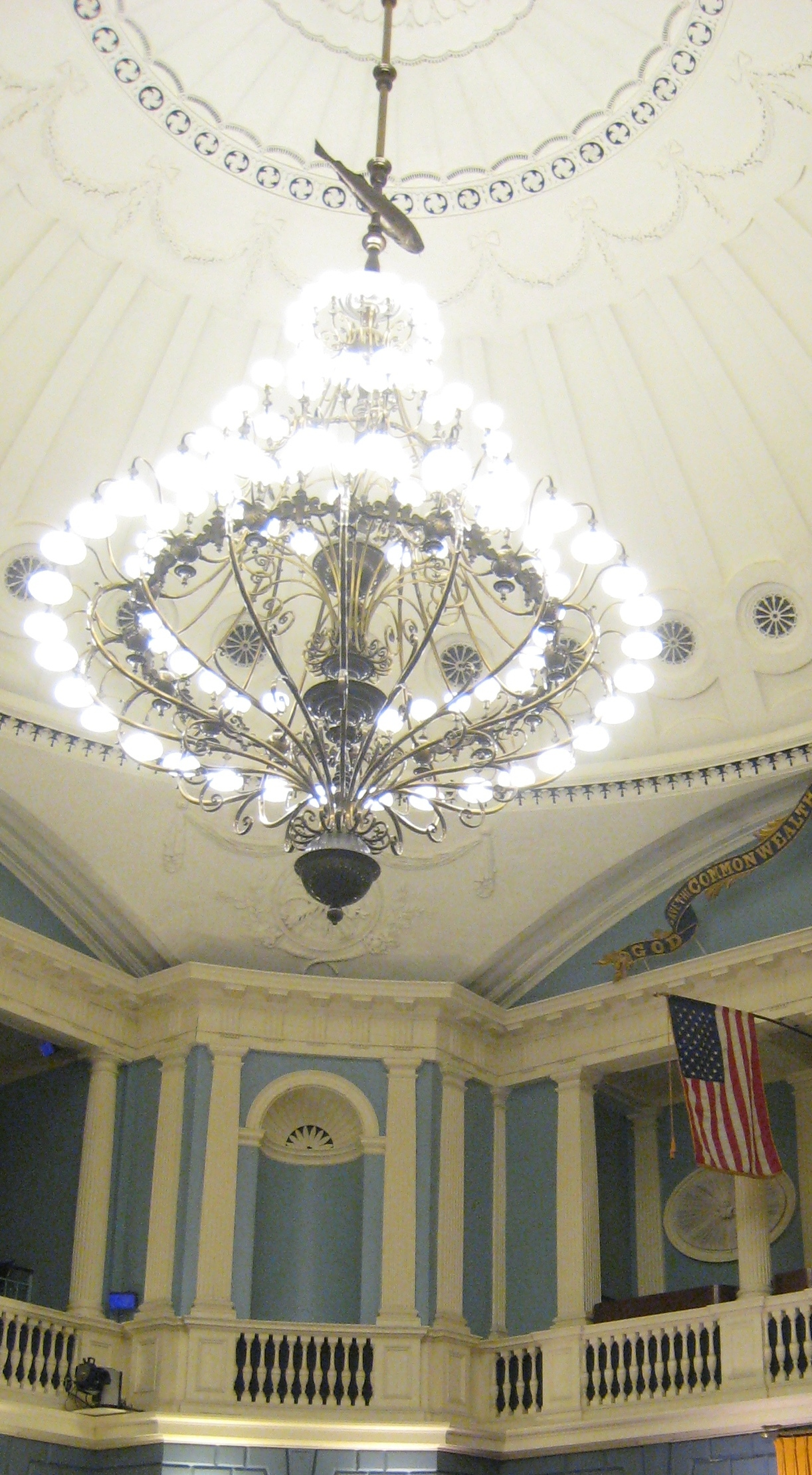
The Holy Mackerel above the chandelier in the Massachusetts Senate chamber, 2008

In an incident now referred to as "The Cod-napping" by State House officials, on the evening of April 26, 1933, members of the Harvard Lampoon (the Harvard College humor magazine) entered the House of Representatives gallery, cut down the Cod, and carried it away in an unusually large florist's box equipped with protruding decoy lilies. (Note: According to the Harvard Crimson (the campus daily, and the Lampoon's longtime rival) editors of the Lampoon, to distract their Crimson competitors from interfering with the planned "Cod-napping", first "laid siege to the Crimson building at 5:15 o'clock in the morning and commenced a futile search for the morning's papers which they intended to stamp 'Compliments of the Lampoon.' Disappointed and infuriated by their failure to find the sheets which had previously been hidden ... the invaders took their revenge by binding and gagging J. M. Boyd '35, Crimson editor, who was at the time working in the building. In spite of the gallant attempt at rescue made by R. P. Buch '34, and the effective defense afforded by the shovel of Adolph, veteran janitor, who was subsequently imprisoned in the boiler room, the visitors succeeded in driving Buch out of the building and into the inner sanctuary of the Catholic church [i.e. the nearby Church of St. Paul]. They immediately removed Boyd from the premises, and drove away to Wellesley Hills." In Cambridge, meanwhile, an arranged fracas between Lampoon and Crimson men was staged for the benefit of invited journalists. After sundry other hijinx, "Boyd was taken from Wellesley to Boston, where he and his captors ... were entertained at tea by friends of the kidnaped editor." Late on April 27, having deduced that the Lampoon was behind the Cod theft, Crimson editors issued an ultimatum: either the Lampoon hand the Cod over by midnight (allowing the Crimson to take credit for its return), or its deeds would be exposed. On the morning of April 28, The New York Times reported that the Crimson had accused the Lampoon of taking the Cod.)

External images
- News photo (Leslie Jones, Boston Herald-Traveler, 1933) showing the scene of the crime
- Leslie Jones photo showing the Sacred Cod with Harvard official Charles Apted, who had recovered it from "Codnappers"

According to The New York Times‍—‌which reckoned the Cod's value to be "something less than nothing. As an object of art it is worthless"‍—‌Massachusetts officials were "shocked into a condition bordering on speechlessness" by the theft, "some legislators holding that it would be sacrilege to transact business without the emblem of the Commonwealth looking down upon them." (Nonetheless, at the appointed time "[House] Speaker [Leverett] Saltonstall looked mournfully at the vacant place and then banged the gavel." Barnstable County offered the loan of its own codfish emblem for the duration of the crisis.)

Meanwhile, Boston mayor James Michael Curley received a telephone message: "Tell the Mayor that when the Sacred Cod is returned it will be wrapped in the municipal flag, now flying in front of City Hall. Try and catch us when we cop the flag. Lafayette Mulligan, we are here." "Indignant" police dragged the Charles River and, acting on a tip that a Lampoon editor had flown to New Jersey with the Cod, had the plane searched on landing; the tip turned out to be a red herring. Detectives followed "scores" of clues, one of which took them to a Cambridge box factory and from there to "collegiate circles"‍—‌a "6-foot youth" (tall enough to reach the wires suspending the Cod) had reportedly bought lilies from a Harvard-area florist before being seen in the State House on the day of the theft‍—‌and several Harvard College students were questioned by the school's dean. (Note: After police declared their continued determination to apprehend the thieves (The New York Times reported) "the failure of the authorities to join in the spirit of the affair" precipitated the sudden reappearance of miscellaneous other stolen property in and around Harvard: "Two Harvard students [turned in to police] a large brass jug, a brass plate, a cocktail shaker, a large poster of the Harvard Advocate of 1906, and a large plaster plaque with quaint lettering ... A large iron horse, property of the Boston Police Department, and a box office sign stolen from Boston Garden, were abandoned during the night on Mt. Auburn St., Cambridge, as the marauders disposed of pilfered articles and signs.") "So much general interest was provoked that The Boston Transcript indulged in two columns of news, hearsay, and speculation upon the missing emblem," the Times further reported, later referring to the Cod as Boston's Palladium.

Eventually a mysterious telephone call directed Harvard official Charles R. Apted to West Roxbury, where he was met by an automobile which he followed into some woods; there two young men, with collars up and hatbrims down, handed him the Cod (not wrapped in any flag) before speeding away. In the early hours of April 29, after repairs to three damaged fins, the Sacred Cod was re-hung in the House chamber, "six inches [15 cm] higher [than] the reach of any individual. A stepladder will be needed to remove it in the future." (Note: A month later the Los Angeles Times published a poem by James J. Montague, "The Pilfered Cod": From Winthrop Beach to Bunker Hill, / From Cambridge to Revere, The voice of happiness was still, / One heard no note of cheer. A pallor whitened every face. / All eyes were red and swollen; A dreadful crime had taken place – / The Codfish had been stolen. The Fish that symbolized a trade / Which, in the days of old, The shores of old New England made / A strand of shining gold, The Fish that millions came to view / With ardent admiration, The Fish whose fame has echoed to / The corners of the nation. When first I set my roving feet / Upon Bostonian sod, I hastened blithely up the street / To view the Sacred Cod, And in its dull and glassy eyes, / The instant of our meeting, I fancied that I saw arise / A glance of cordial greeting. Today there is an end of grief; / No more the skies loom black; A chastened and repentant thief / Has brought the Codfish back. No Stygian gloom now broods around, / No heart with woe is freighted; Bostonian pulses leap and bound – / The Cod is reinstated.)

=== University of Massachusetts ===
Using a stepladder, on November 14, 1968, students at the new Boston campus of the University of Massachusetts took the Sacred Cod in protest of perceived legislative indifference to their school. ("Sacred Cod gone from House perch", the Boston Globe alerted its readers.) It was found days later in a little-used State House hallway.

=== Greyhound replacement proposal ===
In 1937 Representative John B. Wenzler offered a facetious proposal "that the sacred cod be immediately removed [from the House chamber], and a greyhound substituted in its place, as the 1937 Legislature has shown itself to be completely under the power of the dog track operators." Apted (whom the Boston Globe referred to as "Harvard Cop No. 1") wrote to Wenzler: "As one who is, and was, very much interested in preserving [the Cod's] dignity, and furthermore having held it in my arms ... I most respectfully ask a favor, that is: If the greyhound be substituted, that I be presented with the cod in order that it may be preserved for the future of young Americans."

=== World War II ===
After the House of Representatives moved to its new chamber in 1895, the Massachusetts Senate, which took over the old House chamber, incorporated a fish figure (often dubbed the Holy Mackerel) into the chandelier there, as a reminder of the Sacred Cod the Representatives had taken with them. (Note: Henderson, Helen W. (1919). A Loiterer in New England. p. 360. See also photograph following page 354.) When officials of the World War II aluminum-for-defense drive‍—‌misinformed that the Sacred Cod was aluminum‍—‌asked that it be donated to the war effort, House Speaker Christian Herter explained that the Cod had been created decades before aluminum's discovery, and suggested that the Holy Mackerel be considered for sacrifice instead.

== Sources and further reading ==
Further reading

- C.	Massachusetts. General Court. House of Representatives. Committee on History of the Emblem of the Codfish. (1895). A History of the Emblem of the Codfish in the Hall of the House of Representatives. Compiled by a Committee of the House. Boston: Wright and Potter.

Other sources cited
