= East Island (Long Island Sound) =

Island in Glen Cove, New York

- Interactive map of East Island

Geography
- Location: Glen Cove, New York
- Coordinates: 40°53.62′N 73°38.13′W

Administration
- United States

East Island is an island that is part of the city of Glen Cove in Nassau County, New York, United States, at the north shore of Long Island Sound. The island was originally part of the Dosoris tract and has sometimes been known as Morgan's Island, Mutlear Island, Presque Isle and Butler's Island.

== History ==
=== Ownership ===
The Matinecock tribe originally occupied the island. On June 22, 1667, the Matinecock tribe sold the island to Robert Williams of Hempstead. Williams, a near relative of Roger Williams, purchased nearly 1,000 acres of land in total as part of this transaction with the Indians. On November 24, 1668, a patent of confirmation was issued by Governor Richard Nicolls. The patent included both "West Island" and "East Island."

On September 24, 1670, in exchange for one quit rent of wheat yearly, Williams sold his land to Colonel Lewis Morris, from Barbados, the brother of Richard Morris, the first proprietor of Morrisania. In 1686, Governor Thomas Dongan, 2nd Earl of Limerick issued the patent for the transaction. They are part of the powerful and aristocratic, Morris family. Richard's son, Lewis Morris (1671–1746), was Chief Justice of the New York Supreme Court and Governor of New Jersey and his one great-grandson, Lewis Morris (1726–1798), signed the Declaration of Independence, and another, Gouvernor Morris, helped write the Constitution.

On August 10, 1693, Morris sold the land to Daniel Whitehead for $390, who conveyed the island to his daughter and son-in-law, John Taylor, for $390 as well.

Taylor then bequeathed it to his daughter, Abigail, who married Reverend Benjamin Woolsey, a reverend of the first church in Southold, Long Island. Benjamin Woolsey coined the name Dosoris (Dos-Uxoris) for his estate, which comprised, at the time, both East Island and the neighboring, West Island. Dosoris means "Wife's Dowry" and referred to the fact that they had come to own the property through his wife, Abigail's inheritance from her father. One of their sons, Colonel Melancthon Taylor Woolsey, was killed in the Battle of Ticonderoga in 1758, during the French and Indian War. He was a lieutenant colonel in the New York provincial forces and muster master of the Queens County militia.

In 1766, the executors of Colonel Melancthon Taylor Woolsey's estate sold 416 acres of property, including East Island, to John Butler, for $4,000.00. He was known as "John the Miller" due to the tide mills that he built and operated on the dam between East Island and West Island. His daughter, Hannah, married Nathaniel Coles, who bought the remainder of the Woolsey estate, as well as West Island for $3,600. Their son, Nathaniel Coles Jr. bred the thoroughbred horse, American Eclipse on West Island.

Jack Morgan of the Morgan banking family purchased the island, in 1909, for 10 Million Dollars. Soon thereafter, he erected his palatial home, Matinecock Point, on the island. The Morgan family lived on East Island from 1909 until J.P. Morgan Jr.'s death in 1943.

After Mr. Morgan died in 1943, the mansion was occupied by the Soviet Union embassy to the United States for several years. The next occupants were monastic nuns, The Sisters of St. John the Baptist. During the 1970s the property was sold to developers; the mansion was torn down in 1980 and replaced by smaller private homes.

The East Island Association was established in 1947 after J.P. Morgan Jr.’s death to ensure the preservation of the privileges akin with living on East Island.

Today, East Island contains roughly 140 homes.

== Gallery ==
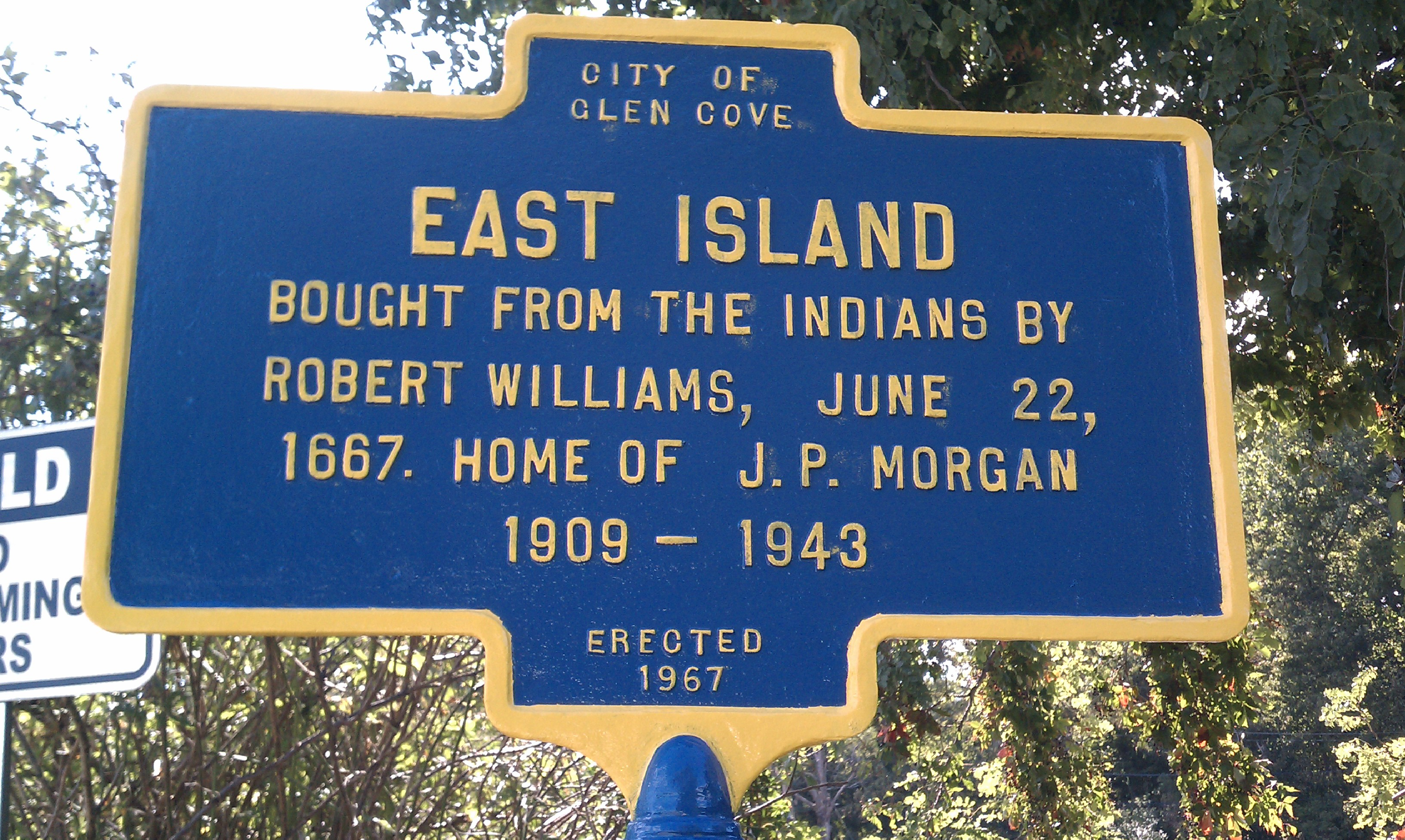
East Island was purchased from the Native Americans in 1667 by Robert Williams, and became the home of J.P. Morgan Jr. in 1909

== Notable residents ==
- Jack Morgan, only son of the banking magnate of the Morgan family
- Roy Campanella, Major League Baseball Hall of Fame catcher for the Brooklyn Dodgers
- Coach Weeb Ewbank, HOFNFL and AFL coach
- Miriam Coles Harris, American novelist
