= Rinehart (Harvard) =

Meme associated with Harvard University

The cry of Rinehart! (more fully Oh, R-i-i-i-n-e-HART!) was a part of Harvard University student and alumni culture in the early decades of the 20th century.

The cry refers to an unknown undergraduate's call, from ground to dormitory window, for John Bryce Gordon Rinehart (1875–1954; Harvard class of 1900). His cry of "Oh, R-i-i-i-n-e-HART!" drifting across Harvard Yard was inexplicably and spontaneously taken up by hundreds of students in the Yard and at open windows of surrounding dormitories. This phenomenon first occurred on June 11, 1900, and for the next forty years cries of "Oh, R-i-i-i-n-e-HART!" (described as "Harvard's rebel yell") could be heard at random times and around the world, wherever Harvard men traveled or congregated, sometimes signalling the start of merry revelry. Every other year, when the Harvard–Yale football game was held in New Haven (home of Yale University), incessant paging of "Call for Mr. Rinehart!" would be heard in the lobby of the Taft Hotel.

John Barrymore mentioned the "Rinehart!" cry in the 1939 film The Great Man Votes. The call was included by journalist George Frazier in his 1932 song "Harvard Blues" (music by Tab Smith), recorded in 1941 by Count Basie and included on the compilation The Count Basie Story, Disc 3 - Harvard Blues (2001, Proper Records).

Rinehart, Rinehart / I'm a most indiff'rent guy / Rinehart, Rinehart / I'm a most indiff'rent guy / But I love my Vincent Baby / And that's no Harvard lie.

Robert Heinlein mentions the cry in his 1954 juvenile The Star Beast, although he misspells the name. Sergei Greenberg, who has come from the Department of Spatial Affairs to oversee the trial of the titular extraterrestrial, and local Judge O'Farrell discover they are both Harvard graduates:

"O'Farrell smiled broadly.... "I understand that you gentlemen from the Department of Spatial Affairs sometimes hand out an unusual brand of law."

"Really? I hope not. I mean to be a credit to Harvard Law."

"Harvard? Why, so am I! Do they still shout for Reinhardt?"

"They did when I was there."

"Well, well, it's a small world!"

Thomas Pynchon describes the cry in Against the Day:

"Popular fellow, this Rinehart," Kit remarked. "A Harvard pleasantry from a few years back," explained Scarsdale Vibe, "which shows no sign of abating. Uttered in repetition, like this, it's exhausting enough, but chorused by a hundred male voices on a summer's evening, with Harvard Yard for an echo chamber? well . . . on the Tibetan prayer-wheel principle, repeat it enough and at some point something unspecified but miraculous will come to pass. Harvard in a nutshell, if you really want to know."

Various legends grew up around the call; for instance, a Harvard man in Africa who was about to be kidnapped by some Arabs supposedly screamed "Rinehart!" and was rescued because there happened to be another Harvard man nearby in the French Foreign Legion.

== Origin ==
It is now considered established that the original target of the call was James Bryce Gordon Rinehart (Harvard 1900). A contemporary piece in the Harvard Crimson adds details:

Rinehart, who is an earnest student, has been in great demand as a tutor to other men in his courses. As he lives at the top of Grays hall his friends have sought to find out whether he was in or not by directing plaintive cries of "Rinehart, O Rinehart" at his windows. This made the studiously inclined who dwell in the neighboring dormitories very tired and they determined to quell Rinehart, so promptly at dark for the past three nights the college yard has resounded with the cries of "Rinehart, O Rinehart." First one end of the yard and then other would send up the plaintive cry, and then all the buildings would swell as if in chorus with the same old plaint. Last night the college police tried to stop the racket, but the boys by a little teamwork kept them running from one dormitory to the other. One man with a megaphone was particularly offensive, but despite the police vigil of three hours the megaphonist was still summoning Rinehart in tearful tones.

As this origin faded from memory, while the cry itself remained current, various false origin stories were circulated. One had Mr Rinehart hiring other students to call his name, to make him appear more popular. These origin stories were collected, and a new one suggested, by Gordon Allport in a prize-winning undergraduate essay.
