= Holocaust Memorial and Tolerance Center of Nassau County =

Coordinates: 40.8840°N 73.6417°W

Holocaust Memorial & Tolerance Center of Nassau County
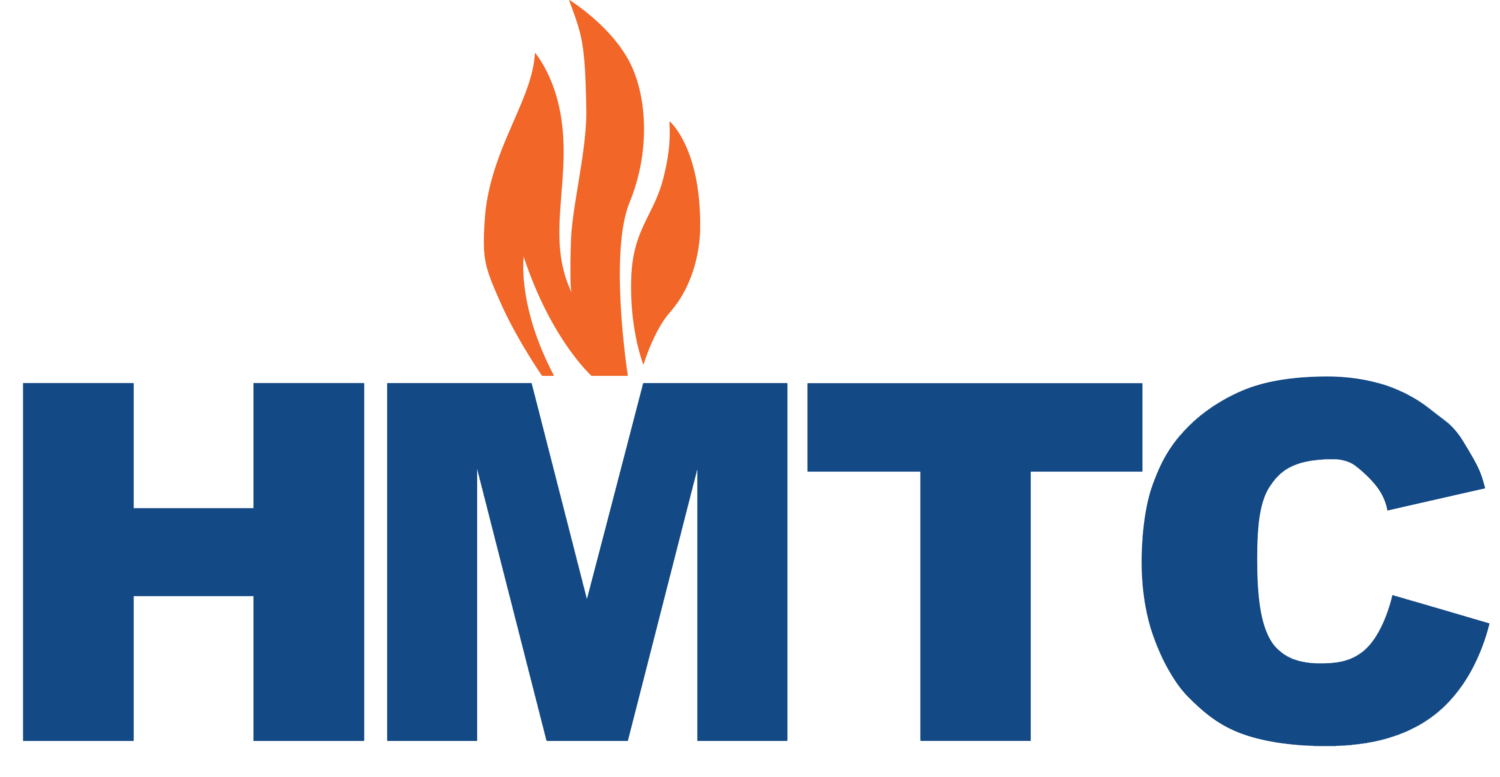

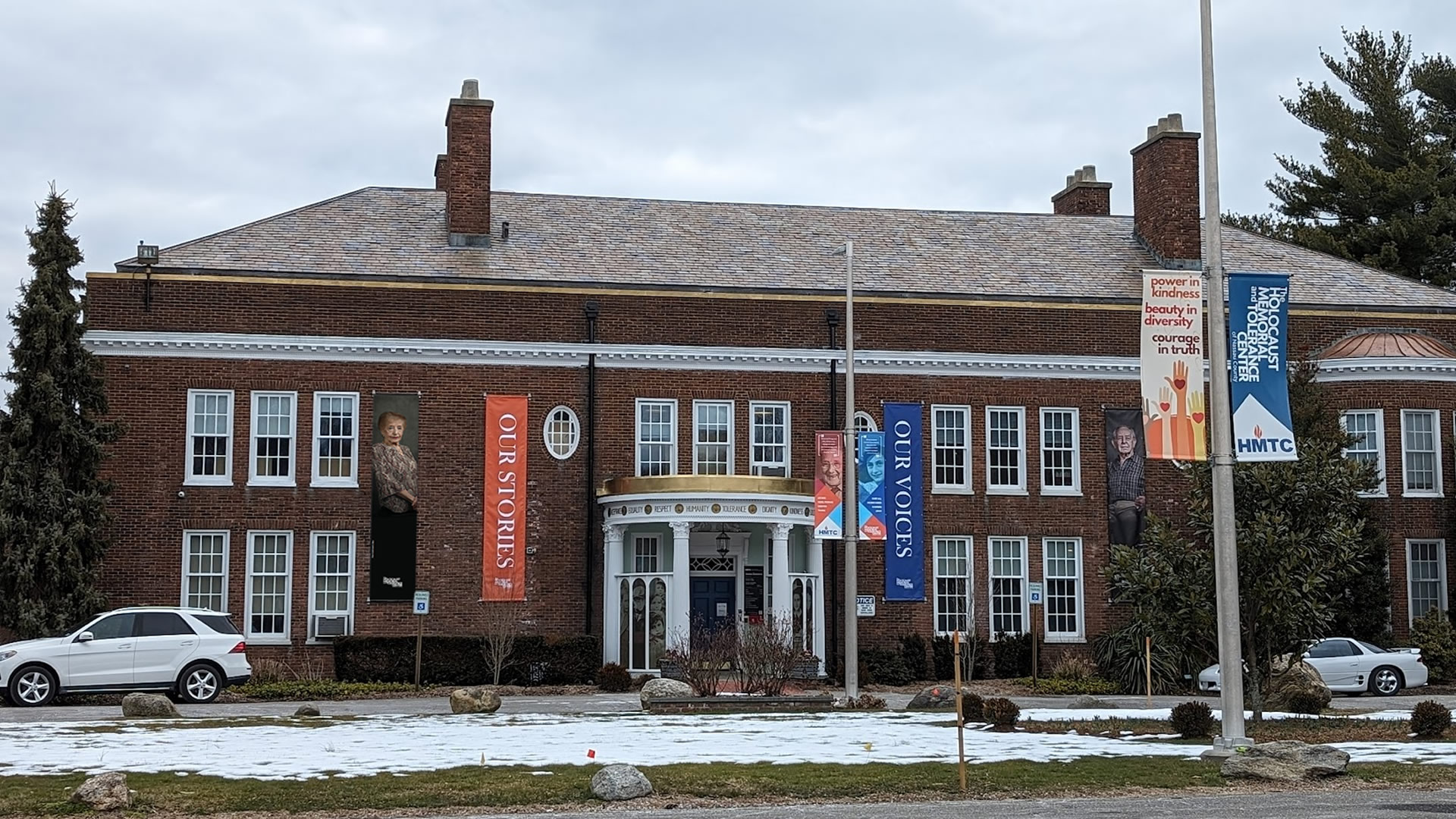
- Front view of the former Welwyn mansion, now the site of the Holocaust Memorial & Tolerance Center of Nassau County
- Established: 1994
- Location: 100 Crescent Beach Rd, Glen Cove, New York 11542
- Type: Holocaust museum
- Founder: Boris Chartan
- Website: https://www.hmtcli.org/

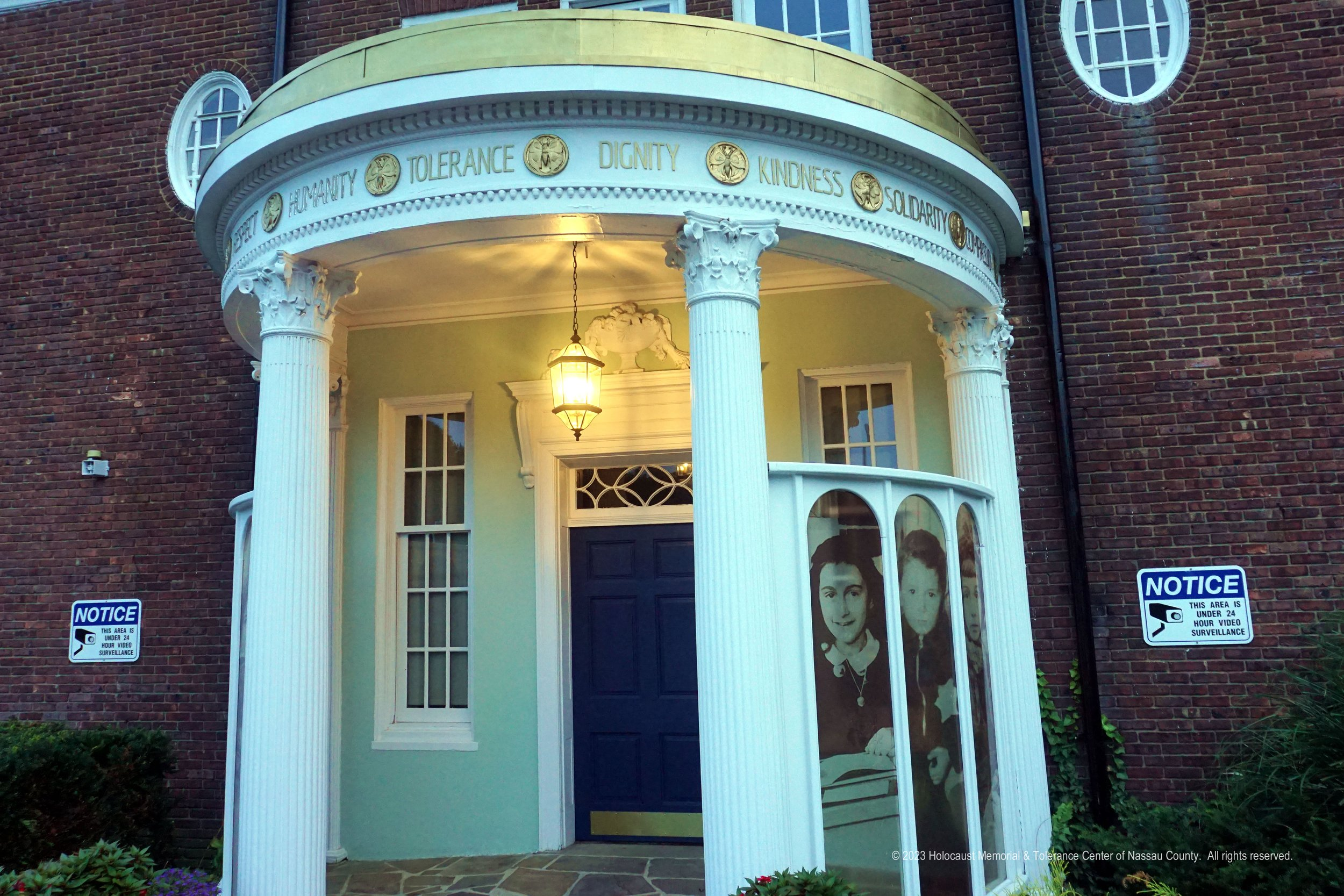

The Holocaust Memorial and Tolerance Center of Nassau County (HMTC) is a Holocaust memorial, a museum and a tolerance center in Glen Cove, on the North Shore of Long Island in the U.S. State of New York. The museum and tolerance center is situated within the original Gold Coast Mansion "Welwyn", in what is now Welwyn Preserve County Park. The memorial also includes the adjoining garden, which was originally designed by the Olmsted Brothers, the influential American landscape architectural firm.

As of 2014, the museum is open on Mondays to Fridays from 10:00 am to 4:30 pm, and on Saturdays and Sundays from 12:00 pm to 4:00 pm.

== History ==
=== Welwyn ===
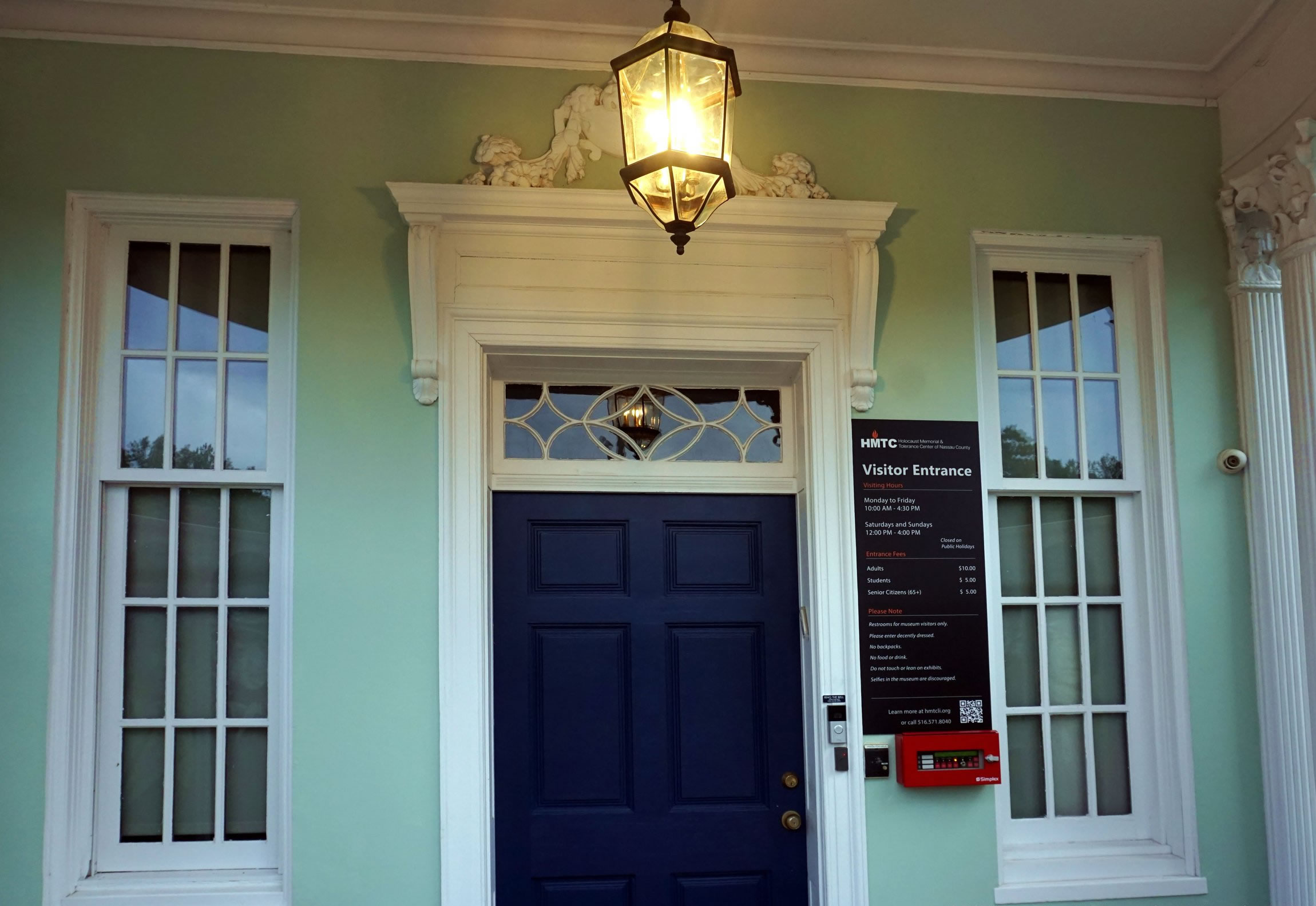
The doorway of the Holocaust Museum.

The museum part of the memorial is housed in the estate's original Georgian-style mansion, "Welwyn", which was built in 1906, and was designed by Delano & Aldrich. Welwyn was part of the estate of Harold Irving Pratt, an American oil industrialist and philanthropist who was born in 1877 and died at Glen Cove in 1939. Harold's wife, Harriet, left the Welwyn estate to Nassau County when she died in 1969. The mansion was neglected for approximately 30 years, during which time for a ten-year period it was used for training staff for the Nassau Sheriff's Department.

=== HMTC ===
The creation and establishment of the Holocaust Memorial and Educational Center of Nassau County, as originally named, resulted from the interfaith vision and bipartisan leadership of Nassau County Executive Thomas S. Gulotta, J.D., who in 1989 announced "plans for a permanent Holocaust Memorial" after having had in 1988 tasked a dedicated Nassau County Holocaust Commission with finding a home for a combined museum and learning place. The dyad of religious community leaders having accepted appointments as the interfaith Heads of the Commission were the Shelter Rock Jewish Center's Rabbi Myron M. Fenster, a past President of the New York Board of Rabbis, and The Most Reverend John R. McGann, D.D., Bishop of the Roman Catholic Diocese of Rockville Centre. Among others called to serve alongside them were Monsignor Donald M. Beckmann, director of the Office of Ecumenical and Interreligious Affairs of the Rockville Centre Diocese; Isaac Blachor, Esq., President of the Jewish Lawyers Association of Nassau County as well as Chair of the Committee on Professional Ethics of the Nassau County Bar Association, who volunteered as the Commission's attorney; Mr. Simon Zareh, president of the Conference of Jewish Organizations of Nassau County (COJONC) and member of the Jewish Community Relations Council (JCRC) of New York, who accepted an appointment as Executive Vice President of the Commission; and Mr. Stanley Garczynski, a Polish Catholic Army Officer sent to Auschwitz in 1940 for his resistance efforts and believed to be the survivor with the lowest camp tattoo number alive in America at the time. Mr. Boris Chartan, a Jewish Polish escapee from the Sasow work camp who was hidden by family-friend Catholics until the war ended, was selected as the inaugural Chairman of the Center's committee at Welwyn in 1992, and Mr. Irving Roth, who survived both the Auschwitz and Buchenwald camps, co-chaired the Dedication on April 18, 1993, over which County Executive Gulotta presided at the ribbon-cutting ceremony and offered keynote dedicatory remarks. With input from the Long Island Historical Society, Mr. Mansour Baradarian, engineer, of Roslyn Harbor, provided critical repairs to Welwyn in preparation for the capital campaign and Opening, at which among the officials and dignitaries in attendance to laud the Commission's collective perseverance and determination to realize this ecumenical accomplishment was United States Representative, The Honorable Gary L. Ackerman.

The "committee members credit [Nassau County Executive Tom Gulotta] with making the center a reality at the county-owned Welwyn;" (https://perma.cc/MM6A-HMKW) his interfaith and bipartisan consensus approach was embraced by those who devoted their time and expertise to establishing the Memorial and Educational Center, particularly when incidents of ethnic cleansing were lamentably resurging around the world. As Mr. Roth noted, "if only Jews say they suffered, maybe it becomes self-serving. But if Jews and Catholics and Russians and Greeks and Poles testify to the suffering, it gives it more meaning," while Mr. Chartan's intention was not simply to teach the history of the Holocaust, but to educate people about the shortcomings of all kinds of hatred, prejudice, and intolerance, including antisemitism, racism, and bullying.

Mr. Chartan would serve as the museum's first chairman upon its opening in 1994. In 1996, the Louis Posner Memorial Library, Long Island’s most extensive collection of literature centered around the Holocaust, genocide, anti-discrimination, and other forms of hate would open at the museum.

Harriet Pratt - a horticulturist - was an avid proponent of nature and preservation, championing the creation of the garden adjacent to the western side of the mansion as well as the installation of numerous greenhouses on the property. In the years following her death, the garden and surrounding grounds fell into disrepair, leading to overgrowth and decay. However, within years of the museum's opening, the once-magnificent butterfly garden was restored and eventually dedicated in 2003 to the over one million children murdered in the Holocaust.
