= Harold Pratt House =

Mansion in Manhattan, New York

Coordinates: 40°46′6.7″N 73°57′57.72″W

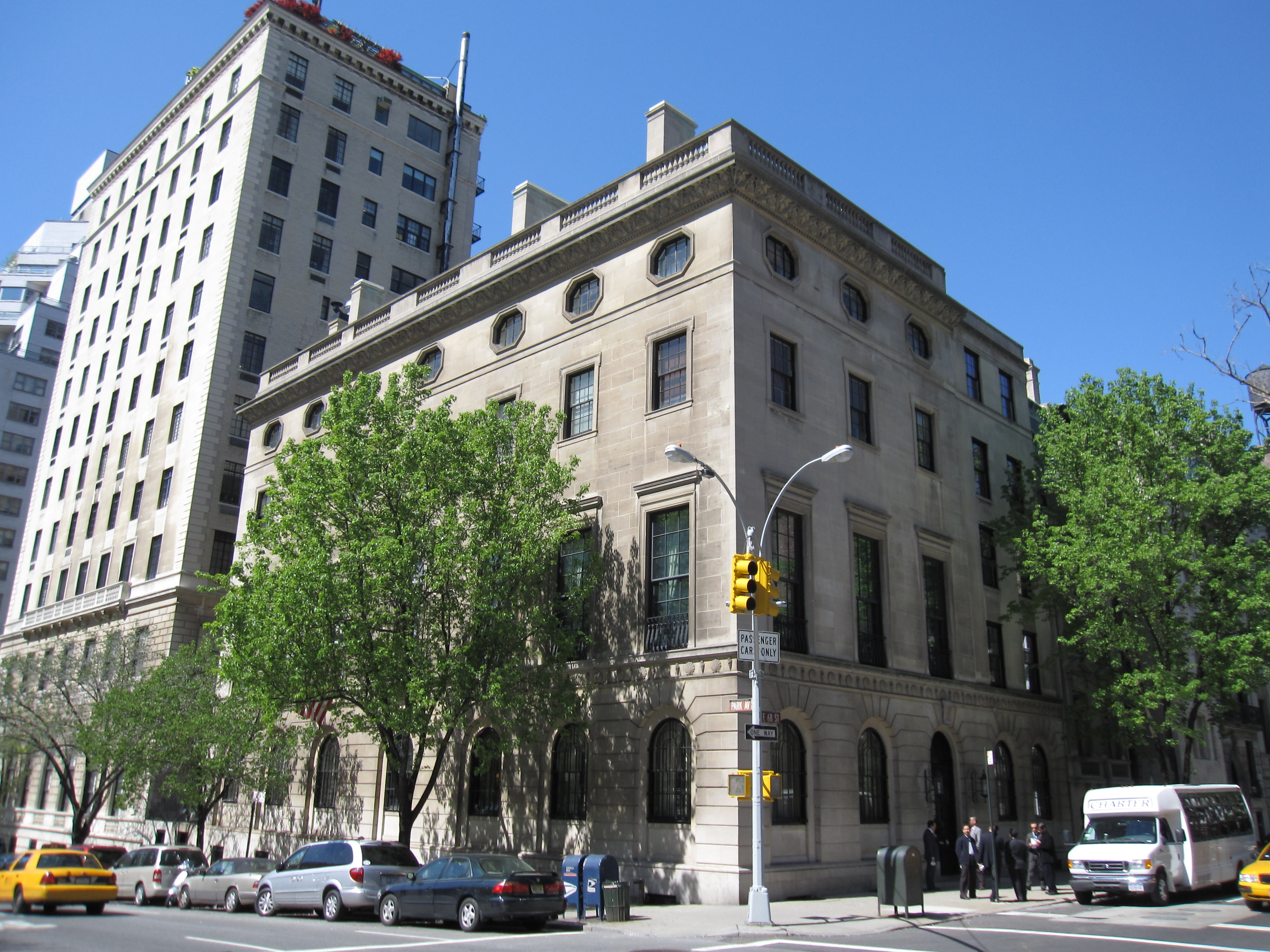
Harold Pratt House

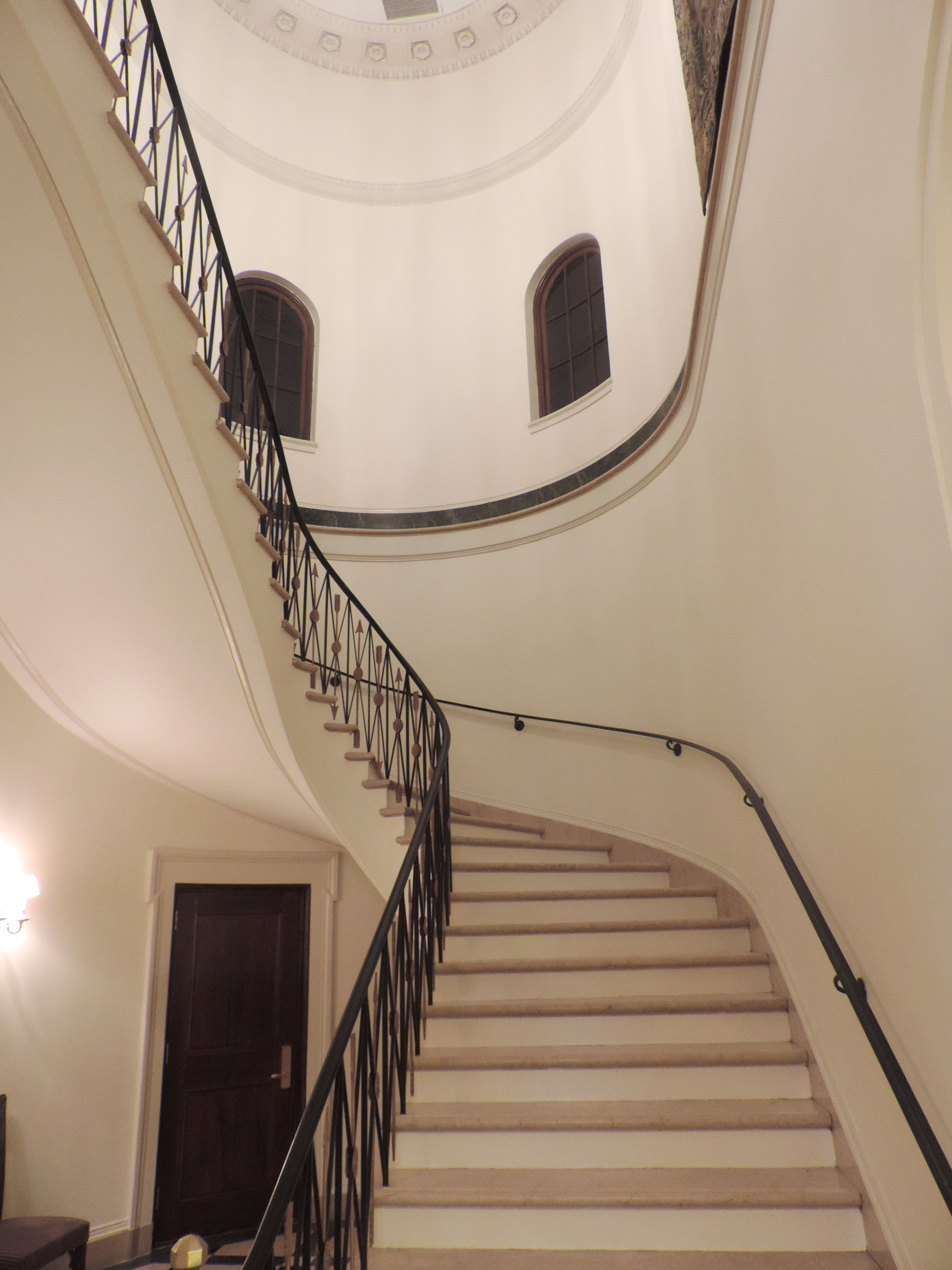
Staircase

The Harold Pratt House is a historic mansion located at 58 East 68th Street (at the corner of Park Avenue) on the Upper East Side of Manhattan in New York City. It serves as the headquarters of the Council on Foreign Relations think tank. The building's formal receptions rooms are also available to be rented for meetings, weddings and other special events.

The house was constructed from 1919 to 1920 as a residence for oil industrialist Harold I. Pratt and his family. The Council on Foreign Relations moved into the building in April 1945 after it was donated by Pratt's widow, Harriet Barnes Pratt, in 1944.
