= Welwyn Preserve =

Nature reserve in New York, US

Coordinates: 40.884°N 73.639°W

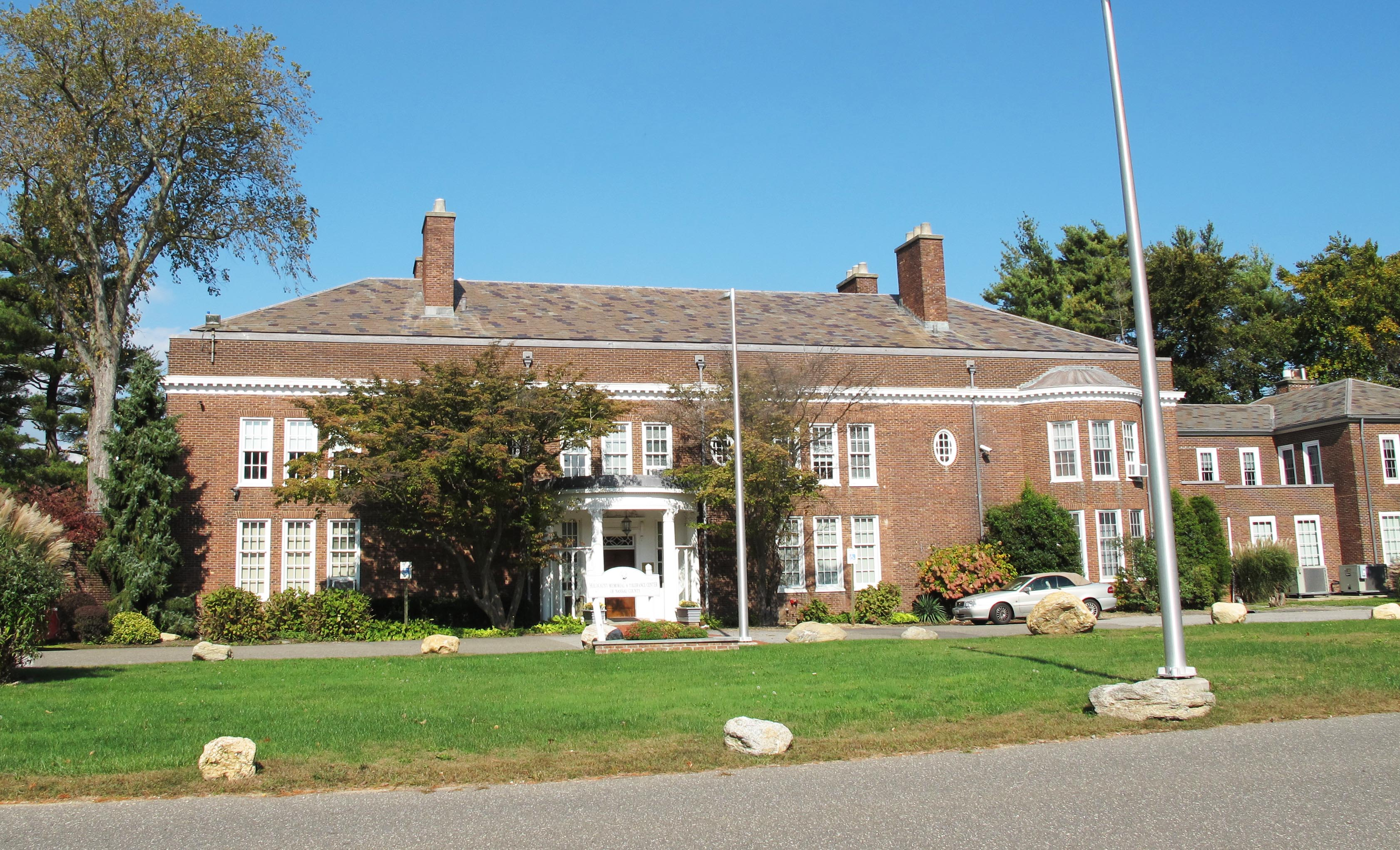
The mansion of the Harold Pratt estate, Welwyn, at Glen Cove, Long Island, New York State, US. Currently, the mansion houses the Holocaust Memorial and Tolerance Center of Nassau County.

Welwyn Preserve County Park is a 204-acre (0.83 km^{2}) public nature reserve in Glen Cove, on the North Shore of Long Island in the U.S. state of New York.

Welwyn Preserve was originally Welwyn Estate, the estate of the industrialist Harold I. Pratt. The main house, Welwyn, was one of the Gold Coast Mansions.

The Welwyn estate also includes woodland and other natural habitats, as well as part of the coast facing north onto Long Island Sound. The mansion is currently used as the Holocaust Memorial and Tolerance Center of Nassau County.

== History ==
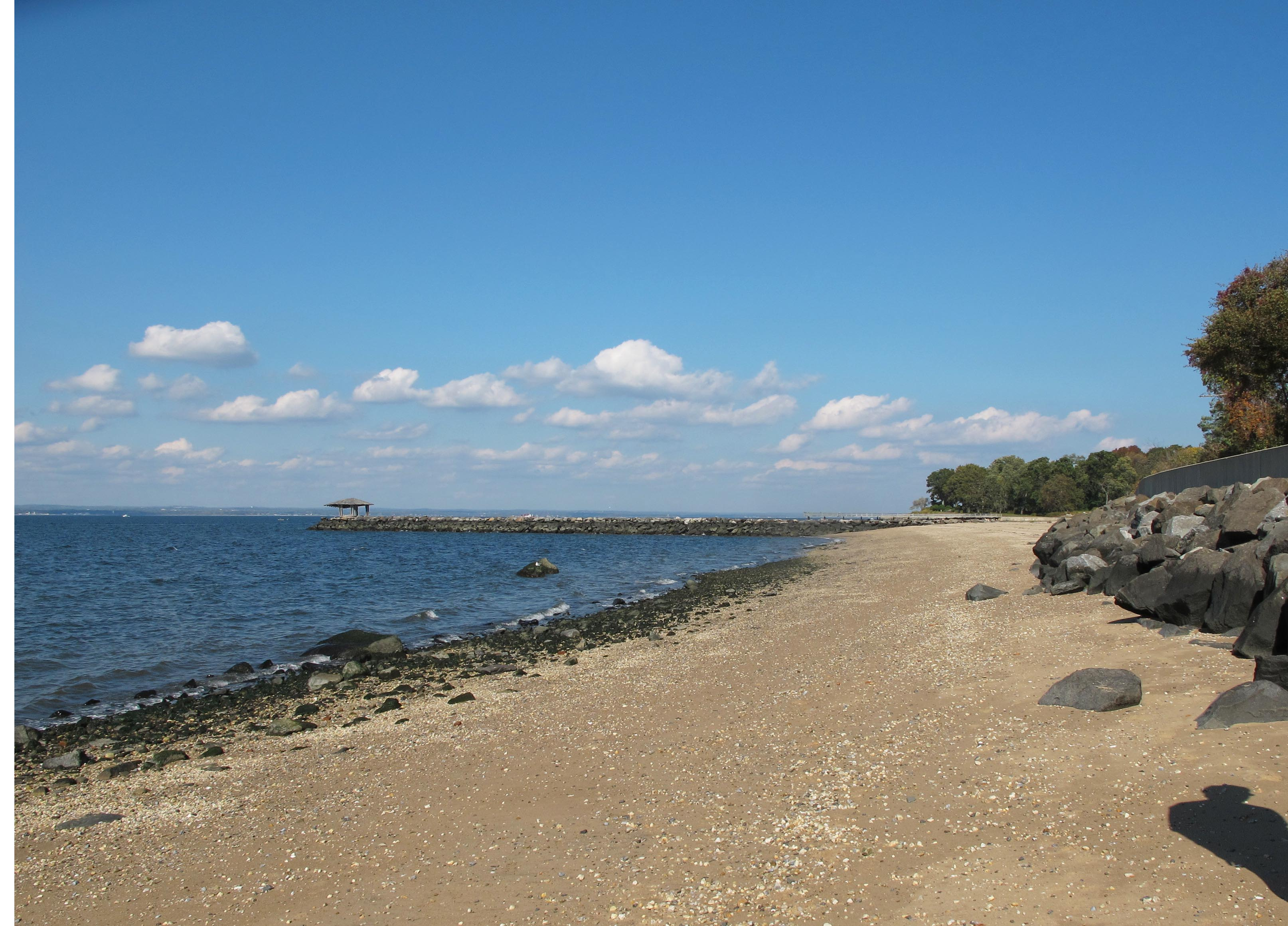
View at low tide looking north along the coast and across Long Island Sound, at Welwyn Preserve

Welwyn was originally the estate of Harold Irving Pratt, an American oil industrialist and philanthropist who was born in 1877, and died at Glen Cove in 1939. Harold Pratt, the owner of Welwyn, was one of the sons of Charles Pratt, who was also an oil industrialist and was the founder of the Pratt Institute in Brooklyn, New York.

Welwyn includes the estate's original Georgian-style mansion, which was built in 1906, and was designed by Babb, Cook & Willard. The home was renovated in 1920 by Delano & Aldrich.

Pratt's wife, Harriet, was an avid horticulturist, leading to the installation of numerous greenhouses on the grounds as well as a luxury garden adjacent to the western side of the main home.

== As a preserve ==
Welwyn Preserve is owned by Nassau County, New York, and is operated as a public preserve. The preserve includes a butterfly garden, extensive mature woodland, salt marsh and a tidal inlet. Dogs are not allowed in the preserve, in order to safeguard the wildlife.

== The museum ==
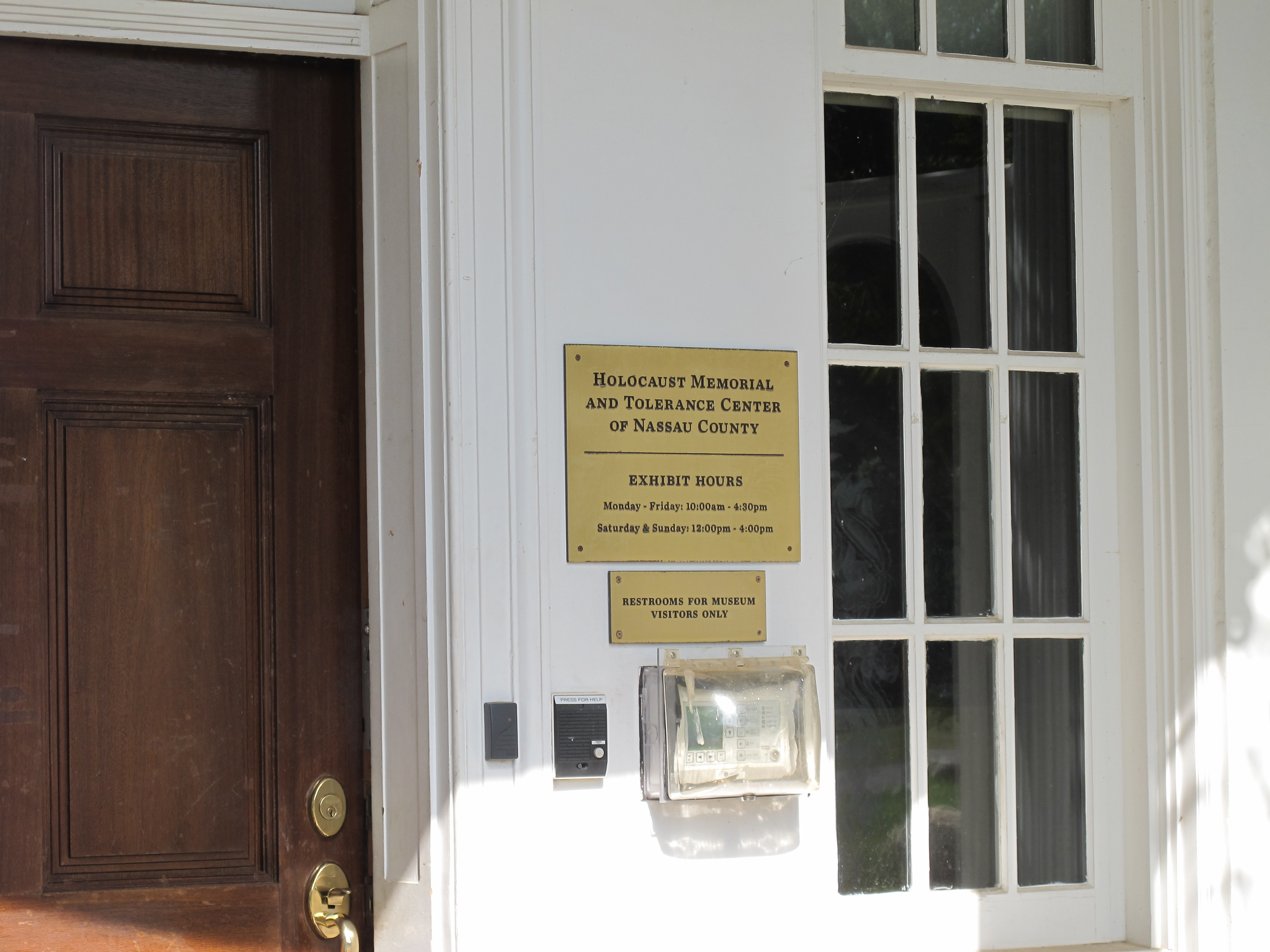
The doorway of the Holocaust museum in the mansion at Welwyn

In 1992, the Holocaust Memorial and Tolerance Center of Nassau County was founded at Welwyn, with the museum officially opening in 1994. Holocaust survivor Boris Chartan served as the first chairman of the museum until 2003.

As of 2014, the museum is open on Mondays to Fridays from 10 am to 4:30 pm, and on Saturdays and Sundays from 12 pm to 4 pm.
