= Glen Cove, New York =

- City
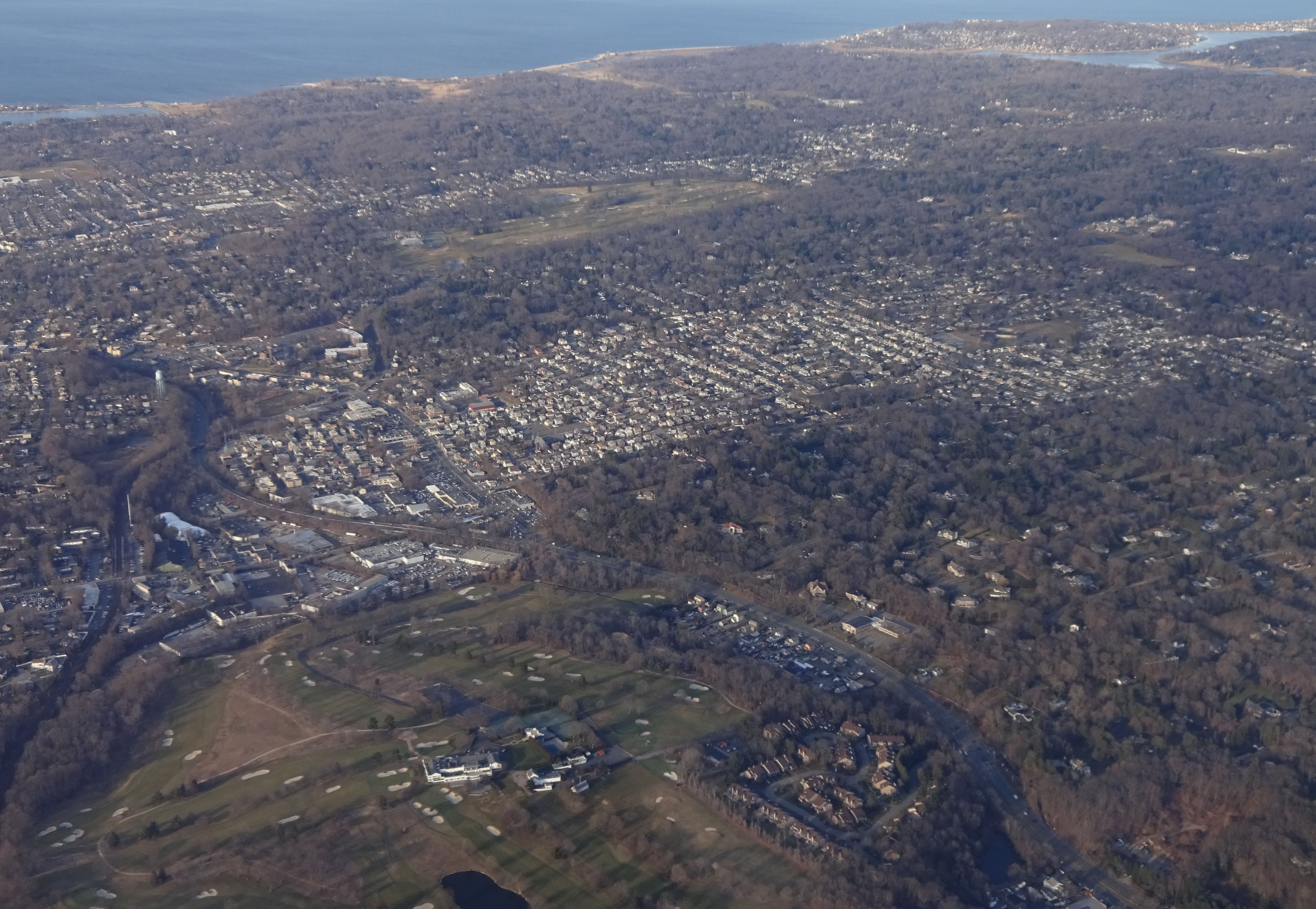
- Glen Cove and its vicinity from the air in 2020

- Seal
- Interactive map of Glen Cove, New York
- Coordinates: 40°52′2″N 73°37′40″W
- Country: United States
- State: New York
- County: Nassau
- Incorporated: January 1, 1918; 108 years ago

Government
  - Type: Strong mayor–council
  - Mayor: Pamela Panzenbeck (R)
  - Police chief: Chris Ortiz

Area
  - Total: 19.24 sq mi (49.84 km^{2})
  - Land: 6.66 sq mi (17.24 km^{2})
  - Water: 12.59 sq mi (32.60 km^{2})
- Elevation: 23 ft (7 m)

Population (2020)
  - Total: 28,365
  - Density: 4,260.3/sq mi (1,644.93/km^{2})
- Time zone: UTC-5 (EST)
  - Summer (DST): UTC-4 (EDT)
- ZIP Codes: 11542 (Glen Cove); 11560 (Locust Valley)
- Area codes: 516, 363
- FIPS code: 36-29113
- GNIS feature ID: 0977339
- Website: glencoveny.gov

Glen Cove is a city located in Nassau County, on the North Shore of Long Island, New York. The city's population was 28,365 at the time of the 2020 census – its highest ever decennial count.

Of Nassau County's five municipalities, Glen Cove is one of two that are cities, rather than towns – the other being Long Beach.

Glen Cove was considered part of the affluent, early 20th-century Gold Coast of Long Island, as the properties located along the area's waterfront were initially developed as large country estates by wealthy entrepreneurs and businessmen (such as J.P. Morgan, Phipps, Pratt, and Prybil).

Historically, with the onset of the Industrial Revolution, Glen Cove blossomed in the areas of manufacturing, agriculture and local retail, all of which were operated and staffed by a diverse workforce. The local opportunities—for potential business owners, entrepreneurs, and others seeking employment—attracted numerous immigrants from Europe, largely from Ireland, Italy, and Eastern Europe. Since the 20th century, Glen Cove has also become the home for new waves of immigrants seeking opportunities from Central and South America, as well as parts of Asia.

== History ==
Ancient cultures of Indigenous peoples had lived in the area for thousands of years. At the time of European contact, bands of the Lenape (Delaware) nation inhabited western Long Island and the areas along today's New York Harbor and adjacent New Jersey, as well as further south down the coast, through present-day Pennsylvania and Delaware, and along the Delaware River. They spoke an Algonquian language. By 1600, however, the band inhabiting this local area was called the Matinecock, after their location.

=== 17th and 18th centuries ===
Glen Cove was used as a port by the English, and for those coming and going further inland to New England. On May 24, 1668, Joseph Carpenter of Warwick, Rhode Island, purchased about 2,000 acres (8.1 km^{2}) of land to the northwest of the Town of Oyster Bay from the Matinecock. Later that year, he admitted four male residents of Oyster Bay as co-partners in the project—the brothers Nathaniel, Daniel, and Robert Coles along with Nicholas Simkins. The five young men, known as The Five Proprietors, named the settlement 'Musketa Cove Plantation'; musketa meaning "place of rushes" in the Lenape language.

=== 19th century ===
In the 1830s, steamboats started regular service on Long Island Sound, between New York City and Musketa Cove, arriving at a point still called The Landing. As the Lenape word Musketa was incorrectly associated with the English word mosquito, in 1834, residents changed the name officially to Glen Cove; this was said to be taken from a misheard suggestion of Glencoe (referring to Glencoe, Scotland or Glencoe, Nova Scotia).

Glen Cove added to its population as workers arrived for jobs at the Duryea Corn Starch factory, which operated until 1900. The name Duryea was suggested as a name to replace Mosquito Cove; however, it was later rejected.

By 1850, Glen Cove had become a popular summer resort for New York City residents. The Long Island Rail Road was extended to Glen Cove in 1867, providing quicker, more frequent services to New York City. The availability of the train, and the town's location on Long Island Sound, made it attractive to year-round residents, thus the population increased.

The vistas afforded from Long Island Sound of the town's rolling hills attracted late 19th-century wealthy industrial barons, including Charles Pratt and his sons, Charles Anderson Dana as well as F.W. Woolworth. They built large, private estates along the island's North Shore. This expanse of settled wealth was part of what became known in the 1920s as the Gold Coast of Nassau County. Part of the Morgan property was donated to the city, and it is now operated as Morgan Park and Beach.

=== 20th and 21st centuries ===
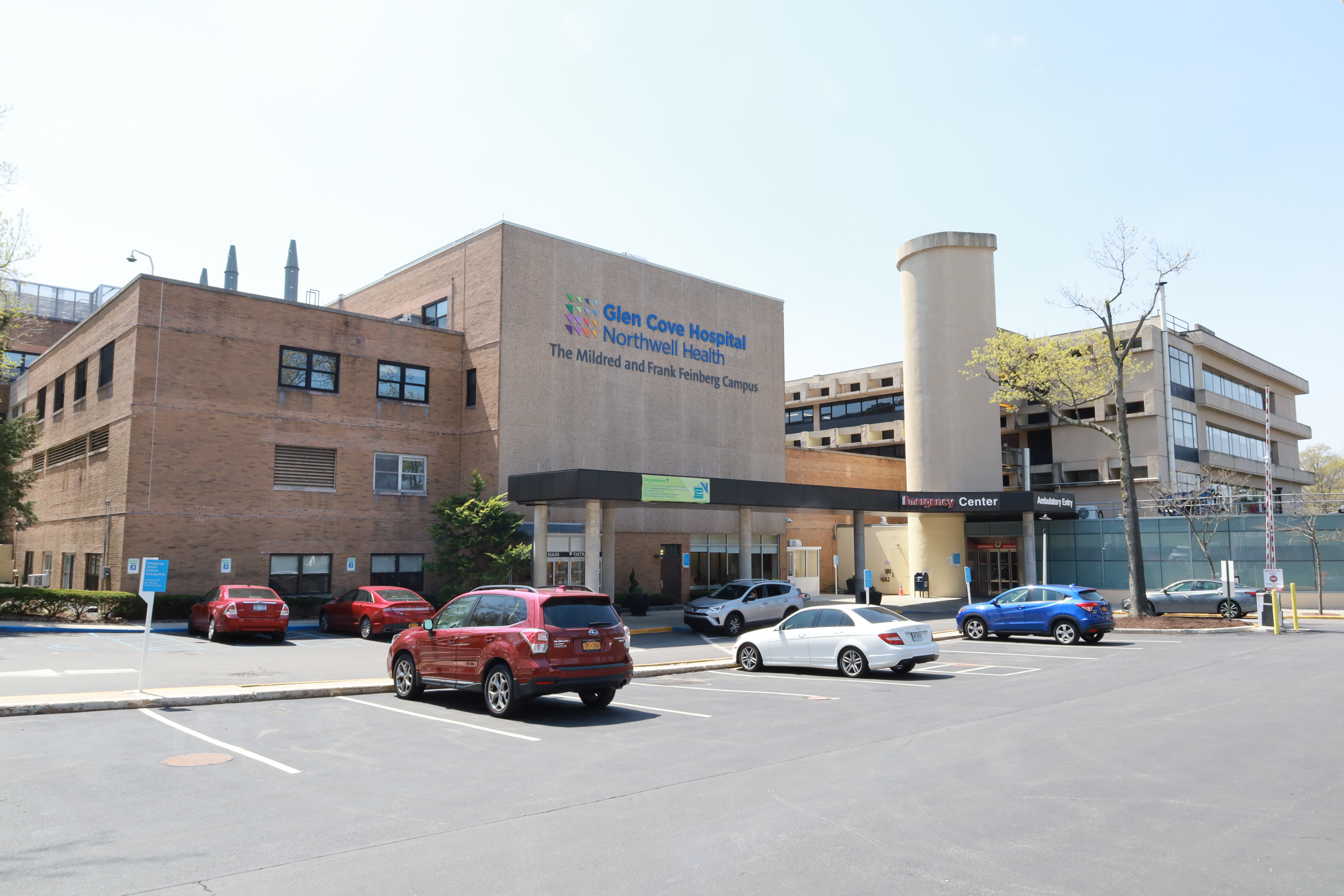
Glen Cove Hospital, by Northwell Health, is a comprehensive medical center.

In 1909, financier J.P. Morgan, Jr. purchased East Island, off the coast of Glen Cove. He built a 41-room mansion with 14-foot ceilings, 16 baths and 18 marble fireplaces. On the morning of July 3, 1915, while Morgan and his wife were having breakfast with the British Ambassador Sir Cecil Spring Rice, a gunman entered the mansion and shot Morgan twice. The gunman was a former Harvard instructor, Erich Muenter, who in 1906 poisoned his wife and assumed a new identity and taught at Cornell under the name "Frank Holt." The gunman was arraigned at the Town of Oyster Bar Courthouse, which today is the home of the North Shore Historical Museum.

On January 1, 1918, Glen Cove became an independent city, separating from the Town of Oyster Bay, after 250 years. The incorporation was driven by a desire for its tax revenues to be used locally, rather than distributed throughout Oyster Bay. Glen Cove, at the time, was an especially wealthy part of the town, but the town's provisions for Glen Cove's police service and roads were seen as "inadequate", given the amount of taxes levied. It was unusual in that Glen Cove was incorporated as a city without ever having been an incorporated village.

By the mid-20th century, most of the mansions had been converted from single-family use. Winfield Hall, the former estate of F.W. Woolworth, remains privately owned.

Altogether, five Pratt families owned a total of about 5,000 acres (20 km^{2}) in the area. John Teele Pratt's estate (The Manor, designed by Charles A. Platt) is operated as the Glen Cove Mansion Hotel and Conference Center.

The Braes, the country estate of Herbert L. Pratt, was purchased by the Webb Institute in 1945, and by 1947 housed a college for naval architecture and engineering.

George DuPont Pratt's estate, Killenworth, was purchased by the Soviet Union in 1951, for both guests and staff of its United Nations (UN) delegation. In 1960, while attending UN meetings, Soviet Premier Nikita Khrushchev and Cuban President Fidel Castro stayed at Killenworth.

Glen Cove's population grew rapidly after World War II. Residential developments replaced pastures and farms. Many new residents were second- or third-generation children of Eastern and Southern European immigrants from Queens or Brooklyn. Many local African Americans were descended from slaves of the colonial period, when colonists had imported enslaved West Africans for domestic and farm labor. Still others came to New York City and surrounding areas during the Great Migration, in the first half of the 20th Century.

Since the late 20th Century, newer Glen Cove residents have been mostly Latin American, East Asian, or South Asian. Glen Cove has a Sikh gurdwara.

== Geography ==
According to the United States Census Bureau, the city has 19.2 square miles (50 km^{2}), of which 6.7 square miles (17 km^{2}) is land and 12.6 square miles (33 km^{2}) – or 65.51% – is water. Glen Cove is bordered on three sides by the Town of Oyster Bay, and on the fourth by the Long Island Sound.

The city is on the North Shore of Long Island, bordering the Long Island Sound. The hills that stretch along the shore are part of the Harbor Hill Moraine – a terminal moraines left by glaciers of the last ice age.

Its sister city is Sturno, Italy, where many immigrants came in the 20th century and settled in Glen Cove.

Glen Cove has a humid subtropical climate (Cfa) that was hot-summer humid continental (Dfa) until the most recent temperature numbers. The monthly average ranges from 32.7 °F in January to 75.5 °F in July. All months now average above freezing, seven months are above 50 °F, and July and August are above 22 °C (71.6 °F.).

== Demographics ==
Historical population
Census	Pop.	Note	%±
1920	8,664		—
1930	11,430		31.9%
1940	12,415		8.6%
1950	15,130		21.9%
1960	23,817		57.4%
1970	25,770		8.2%
1980	24,618		−4.5%
1990	24,149		−1.9%
2000	26,622		10.2%
2010	26,964		1.3%
2020	28,365		5.2%
U.S. Decennial Census

=== Racial and ethnic composition ===
Glen Cove city, New York – Racial and ethnic composition Note: the US Census treats Hispanic/Latino as an ethnic category. This table excludes Latinos from the racial categories and assigns them to a separate category. Hispanics/Latinos may be of any race.
Race / Ethnicity (NH = Non-Hispanic)	Pop 2000	Pop 2010	Pop 2020	% 2000	% 2010	% 2020
White alone (NH)	18,144	16,013	14,775	68.15%	59.39%	52.09%
Black or African American alone (NH)	1,614	1,728	1,595	6.06%	6.41%	5.62%
Native American or Alaska Native alone (NH)	25	31	58	0.09%	0.11%	0.20%
Asian alone (NH)	1,082	1,235	1,449	4.06%	4.58%	5.11%
Native Hawaiian or Pacific Islander alone (NH)	7	20	2	0.03%	0.07%	0.01%
Other race alone (NH)	45	72	176	0.17%	0.27%	0.62%
Mixed race or Multiracial (NH)	369	352	558	1.39%	1.31%	1.97%
Hispanic or Latino (any race)	5,336	7,513	9,752	20.04%	27.86%	34.38%
Total	26,622	26,964	28,365	100.00%	100.00%	100.00%

=== 2020 census ===
As of the 2020 census, Glen Cove had a population of 28,365. The median age was 43.3 years. 18.4% of residents were under the age of 18 and 21.1% of residents were 65 years of age or older. For every 100 females there were 95.0 males, and for every 100 females age 18 and over there were 93.4 males age 18 and over.

100.0% of residents lived in urban areas, while 0.0% lived in rural areas.

There were 10,099 households in Glen Cove, of which 29.3% had children under the age of 18 living in them. Of all households, 47.0% were married-couple households, 18.5% were households with a male householder and no spouse or partner present, and 28.2% were households with a female householder and no spouse or partner present. About 25.0% of all households were made up of individuals and 12.3% had someone living alone who was 65 years of age or older.

There were 10,793 housing units, of which 6.4% were vacant. The homeowner vacancy rate was 1.2% and the rental vacancy rate was 5.4%.

Racial composition as of the 2020 census
Race	Number	Percent
White	16,207	57.1%
Black or African American	1,765	6.2%
American Indian and Alaska Native	214	0.8%
Asian	1,465	5.2%
Native Hawaiian and Other Pacific Islander	4	0.0%
Some other race	4,904	17.3%
Two or more races	3,806	13.4%
Hispanic or Latino (of any race)	9,752	34.4%

=== 2010 census ===
According to the 2010 U.S. census, Glen Cove had a population of 26,964. The racial and ethnic makeup of Glen Cove was 74.2% White (59.4% non-Hispanic white), 7.2% African American, 4.6% Asian, 10.1% some other race, 3.2% two or more races, 0.4% Native American, and 0.1% Hawaiian or Pacific Islander. Hispanics or Latinos of any race made up 27.9% of the population.

=== 2000 census ===
In 2000, the city had a population of 26,622 people, 9,461 households, and 6,651 families residing in the city limits; the population density was 4,006.0 people per square mile (1,545.7/km^{2}).

At the 2000 U.S. census, there were 9,461 households, out of which 29.9% had children under the age of 18 living with them, 53.5% were married couples living together, 12.7% had a female householder with no husband present, and 29.7% were non-families. In 2000, 24.1% of all households were made up of individuals, and 11.3% had someone living alone who was 65 years of age or older. The average household size was 2.72 and the average family size was 3.22. In the city, the population was spread out, with 21.2% under the age of 18, 8.1% from 18 to 24, 30.6% from 25 to 44, 22.6% from 45 to 64, and 17.5% who were 65 years of age or older. The median age was 39 years. For every 100 females, there were 92.8 males. For every 100 females age 18 and over, there were 89.4 males.

The median income for a household in the city was $89,000 and the median income for a family was $108,000 in 2000. Males had a median income of $61,900 versus $40,581 for females. The per capita income for the city was $26,627.

=== 2019 American Community Survey ===
According to the 2019 American Community Survey, the United States Census Bureau determined 54.7% of the population was non-Hispanic white, 8.4% Black or African American, 1.0% American Indian or Alaska Native, 5.3% Asian, 2.7% two or more races, and 25.8% Hispanic or Latin American of any race.

From 2015 to 2019, 52.2% of the city population were female. Glen Cove had an owner-occupied housing rate of 52.5%, an average of 2.70 persons per household, a median household income of $80,702, and a per capita income of $40,703. Of the total population, 13.8% were estimated to live at or below the poverty line.

== Economy ==
Acclaim Entertainment had its headquarters in One Acclaim Plaza, located in Glen Cove. Acclaim bought the three-story, 65,000 square feet (6,000 m^{2}), Class A office building in 1994 for $4 million.

Glen Cove Creek was channelized in the early 20th century by the US Army Corps of Engineers.

Li Tungsten produced tungsten powder and tungsten carbide powder, along with other specialty products. The company was first known as Wah Chang Smelting and Refining Company, and later as Teledyne Wah Chang.

Columbia Ribbon and Carbon Manufacturing Company opened a Glen Cove research lab in 1932 and produced blue printing inks, carbon paper and typing ribbon until 1980.

Powers Chemco, which made photographic equipment and supplies, was renamed Chemco Technologies in 1987. It was later purchased and renamed Konica Imaging U.S.A., and is today known as Konica Minolta Holding USA Inc. The company closed its Glen Cove factory in 2006 and moved to Michigan.

In 1953 and 1958, Pall Corporation established factories to make filtration products. One site was occupied until 1999, the other until 1971, when the building was sold to August Thomsen Corp.

Photocircuits Corporation began manufacturing circuit boards in 1951, and employed 740 workers when it closed in 2007.

Another company, Slater Electric, began making electrical wiring devices in 1956.

In 1988, Pass and Seymour manufactured electric components using an injection molding process.

Formerly, Gladsky Marine operated a marina and marine repair facility along Glen Cove Creek from the early 1970s until 1999. The site was listed by the EPA as a cleanup site. The remediation of semi-volatile organic compounds and metals from the facility was completed in 2010.

== Government ==
The Town of Oyster Bay had jurisdiction over the area from the 1680s until December 31, 1917, when Glen Cove became an independent city; Glen Cove's incorporation was effective the next day. The city has its own police, fire protection, and Glen Cove Emergency Medical Services. The fire department and emergency medical services are volunteer agencies. The Office of Emergency Management is responsible for the planning, coordination, and response to natural and human-made emergencies that occur within the City of Glen Cove.

In the 2024 U.S. presidential election, the majority of Glen Cove voters voted for Donald J. Trump (R).

The City of Glen Cove is governed under a strong mayor-council government, with the governing body being the Glen Cove City Council.

=== Mayor ===
As of January 2026, the Mayor of Glen Cove is Pamela D. Panzenbeck; this position is elected at-large. She defeated former Glen Cove councilwoman Marsha Silverman in the 2025 Glen Cove election, becoming the first female mayor to be elected to three terms, both consecutively or discontinuously. The 2025 Glen Cove election was the first election in the city's history consisting of only female mayoral candidates.

Previously, in January 2022, Panzenbeck defeated and succeeded two-term Mayor Timothy Tenke – and, in the 2023 Glen Cove election, she defeated former Nassau County Comptroller George Maragos.

==== List of mayors ====
The following is a list of Glen Cove's mayors, from 1918 to present:

Mayors of Glen Cove:
Mayor's name	Year(s) in office
James E. Burns	1918–1925
William H. Seaman	1926–1929
James E. Burns	1930–1933
Harold F. Mason	1934–1939
Horace K.T. Sherwood	1940–1941
H. Bogart Seaman	1942
William H. Seaman	1942–1943
Arthur Aitkinhead	1944–1947
Luke A. Mercadante	1948–1951
Joseph A. Stanco	1952–1955
Joseph A. Suozzi	1956–1960
Patrick J. Kenny	1961
Joseph M. Reilly	1962–1965
Joseph W. Muldoon	1966–1967
Andrew J. DiPaola	1968–1972
Vincent A. Suozzi	1973–1979
Alan M. Parente	1980–1983
Vincent A. Suozzi	1984–1987
Donald P. DeRiggi	1988–1993
Thomas R. Suozzi	1994–2001
Mary Ann Holzkamp	2002–2005
Ralph V. Suozzi	2006–2013
Reginald A. Spinello	2014–2017
Timothy J. Tenke	2018–2021
Pamela D. Panzenbeck	2022–Present

Suozzi Family

The Suozzi family have had four members serve as mayor: brothers Joseph Suozzi and Vincent "Jimmy" Suozzi, Joseph's son Tom Suozzi, and Jimmy's son Ralph Suozzi. Members of the Suozzi family have a combined total of 32 years as mayor, roughly 30% of Glen Cove's history as a city.

Additionally, Joseph Suozzi was the youngest city judge for Glen Cove, elected at age 28, and then a justice of the Supreme Court of the State of New York, the state's trial court, and later associate justice of the Appellate Division, Second Department. Tom Suozzi was the youngest mayor in Glen Cove's history. He subsequently served as Nassau County Executive during 2002–2009 and in the U.S. House of Representatives during 2016–2022 and 2024–present, and unsuccessfully ran for governor twice.

=== City Council ===
The members of the Glen Cove City Council are elected from single-member districts.

As of January 2026, the members of the Glen Cove City Council are Grady Farnan, Kevin Maccarone, Danielle Fugazy Scagiola, John Perrone, John Zozzaro, and Michael Ktistakis.

== Parks and recreation ==
=== Morgan Memorial Park ===
Morgan Memorial Park is a 40-acre park offering scenic view of Hempstead Harbor and lush green spaces. The park land, originally purchased by J.P. Morgan Jr., was converted to a park upon the death of wife, Jane Norton Grew, in 1925. Morgan, a Glen Cove resident, leased the park to the City of Glen Cove for 999 years. The park land served as a steamboat landing up until the early 1900s.

Presently, the Morgan Park Music Festival holds free concerts on Sunday evenings during July and August at the Morgan Park Amphitheatre.

=== Welwyn Preserve ===
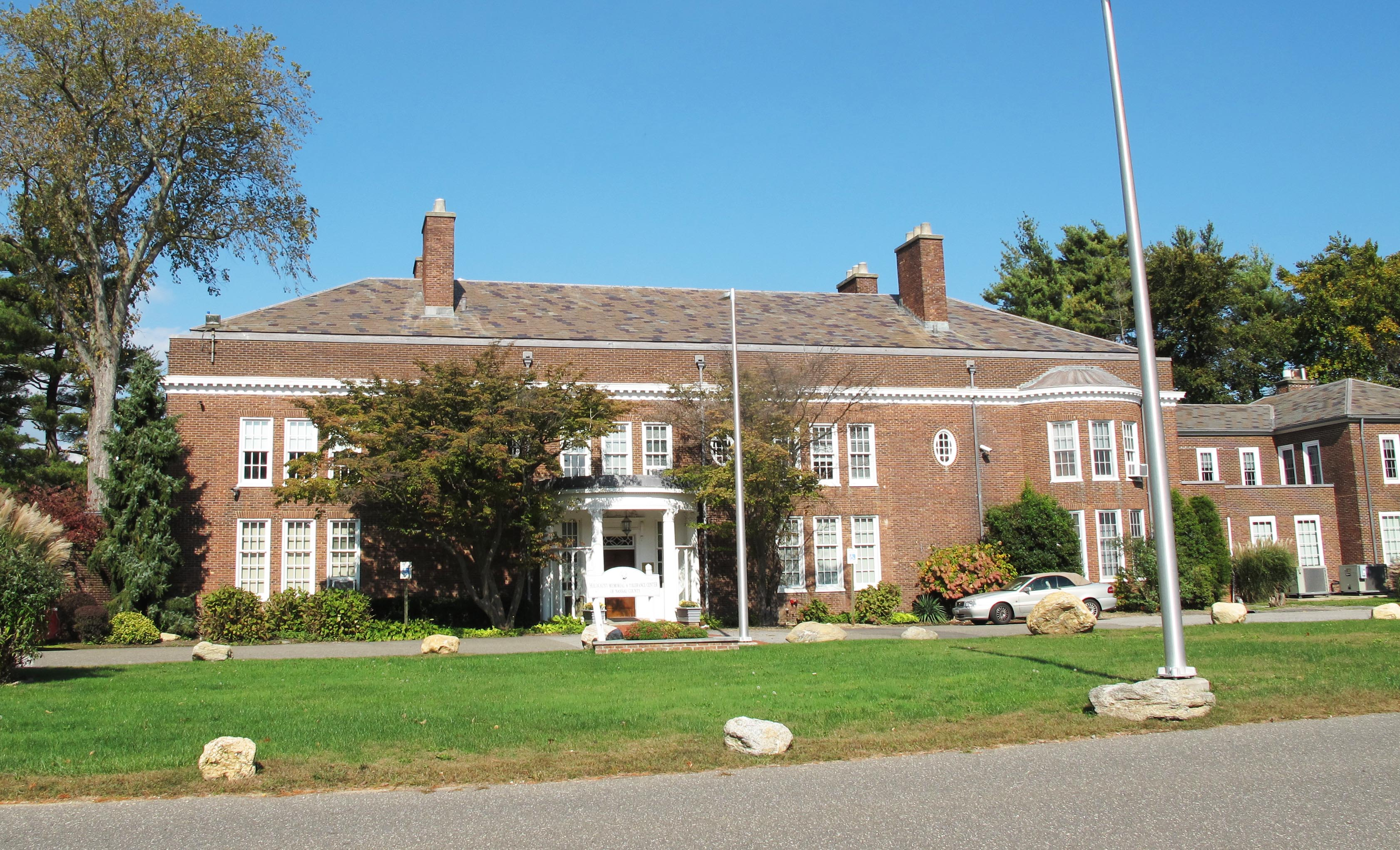
The Welwyn mansion at the Welwyn Preserve in 2014

Welwyn Preserve, the former Harold Pratt estate, is a 204-acre (0.83 km^{2}), densely wooded preserve open to the public. It features nature trails and a variety of habitats, including a wooded stream valley, fresh water ponds and swamps, a coastal salt marsh, and a stretch of Long Island Sound shoreline. More than 100 species of birds and a variety of small native mammals, reptiles and amphibians inhabit the preserve's grounds. It is the site of the Holocaust Memorial & Tolerance Center, which offers exhibits and other educational programs.

=== Harriet Barnes Pratt Park ===
Named in honor of Harriet Barnes Pratt by the Glen Cove City Council. The park was dedicated on May 31, 1937.

== Education ==
=== Public Schools ===
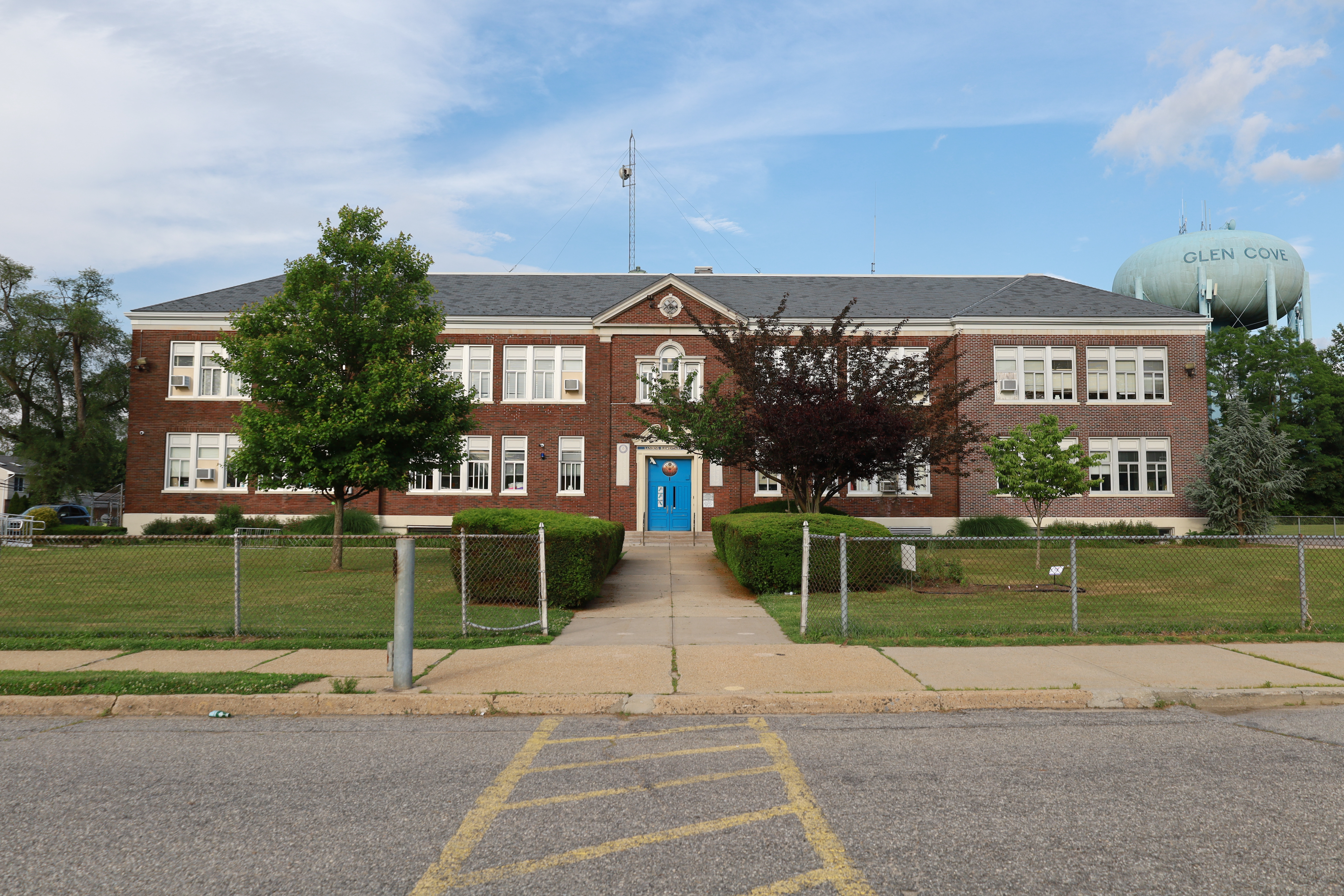
The Glen Cove City School District's Landing School in 2021

The City of Glen Cove and its residents are served by the Glen Cove City School District. Children who live in the City attend the Eugene J. Gribbin/ Katherine A. Deasy Elementary schools for grades K-2 (pre-k offered at Deasy), Landing/Margaret. A. Connolly schools for grades 3–5, Robert M. Finley Middle School for grades 6–8, and Glen Cove High School for grades 9–12. Finley Middle School was one of ten NASSP Breakthrough Schools. The Glen Cove City School District's "Paired Plan" for elementary schools has the Gribbin and Connolly schools paired, as well as the Deasy and Landing schools. All students from across the city attend joint classes in the central Middle and High schools.

=== Private Schools ===
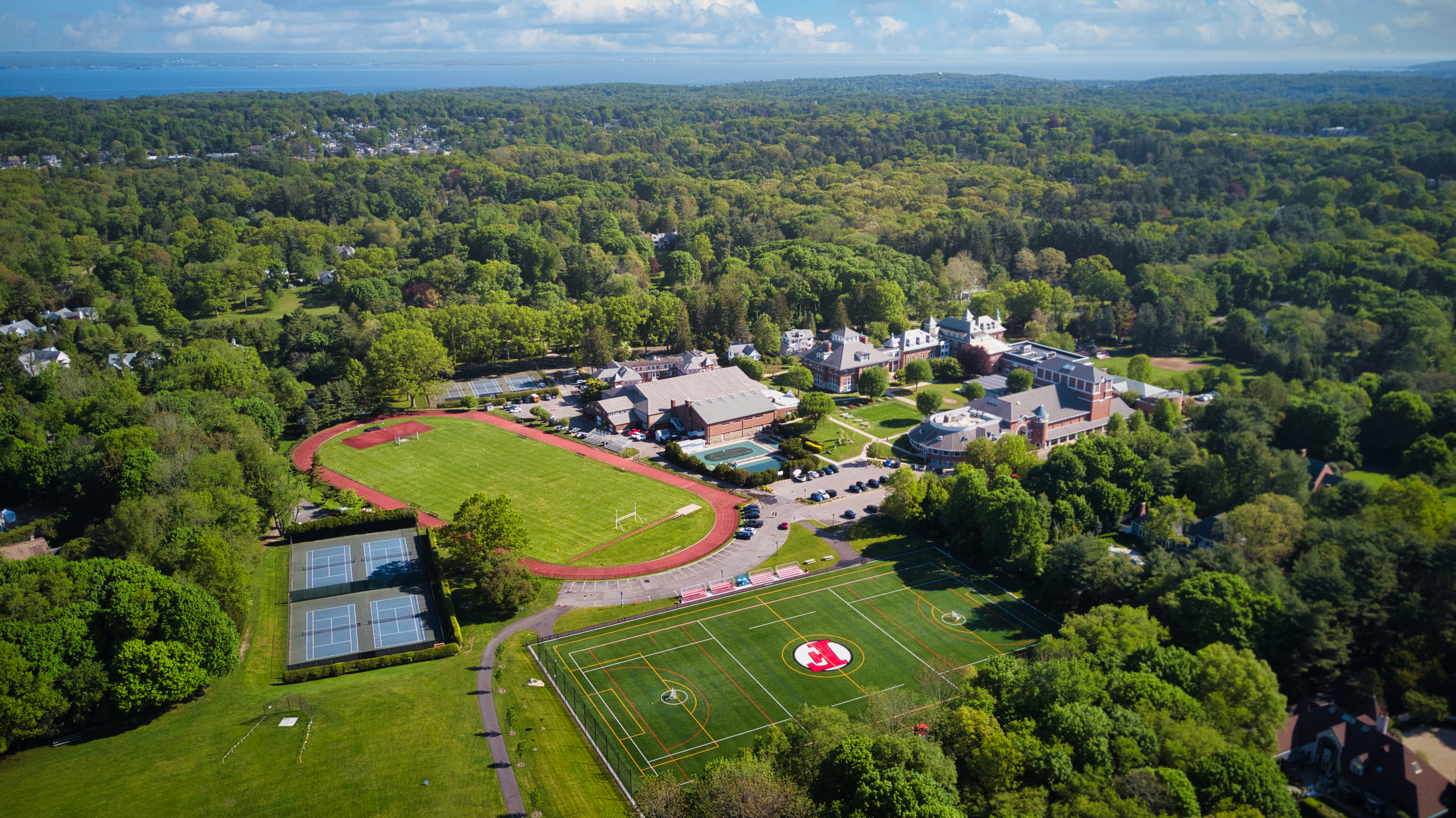
Friends Academy in 2022

There are several private educational institutions inside the city limits:

- All Saints Regional Catholic School, which closed in 2019
- Friends Academy (pre-K – 12) is a Quaker-founded private school that is located within the City of Glen Cove but has a Locust Valley mailing address.
- Webb Institute of Naval Architecture and Marine Engineering, a four-year college

== Transportation ==
The City of Glen Cove is served by rail and bus transit systems.

=== Rail ===
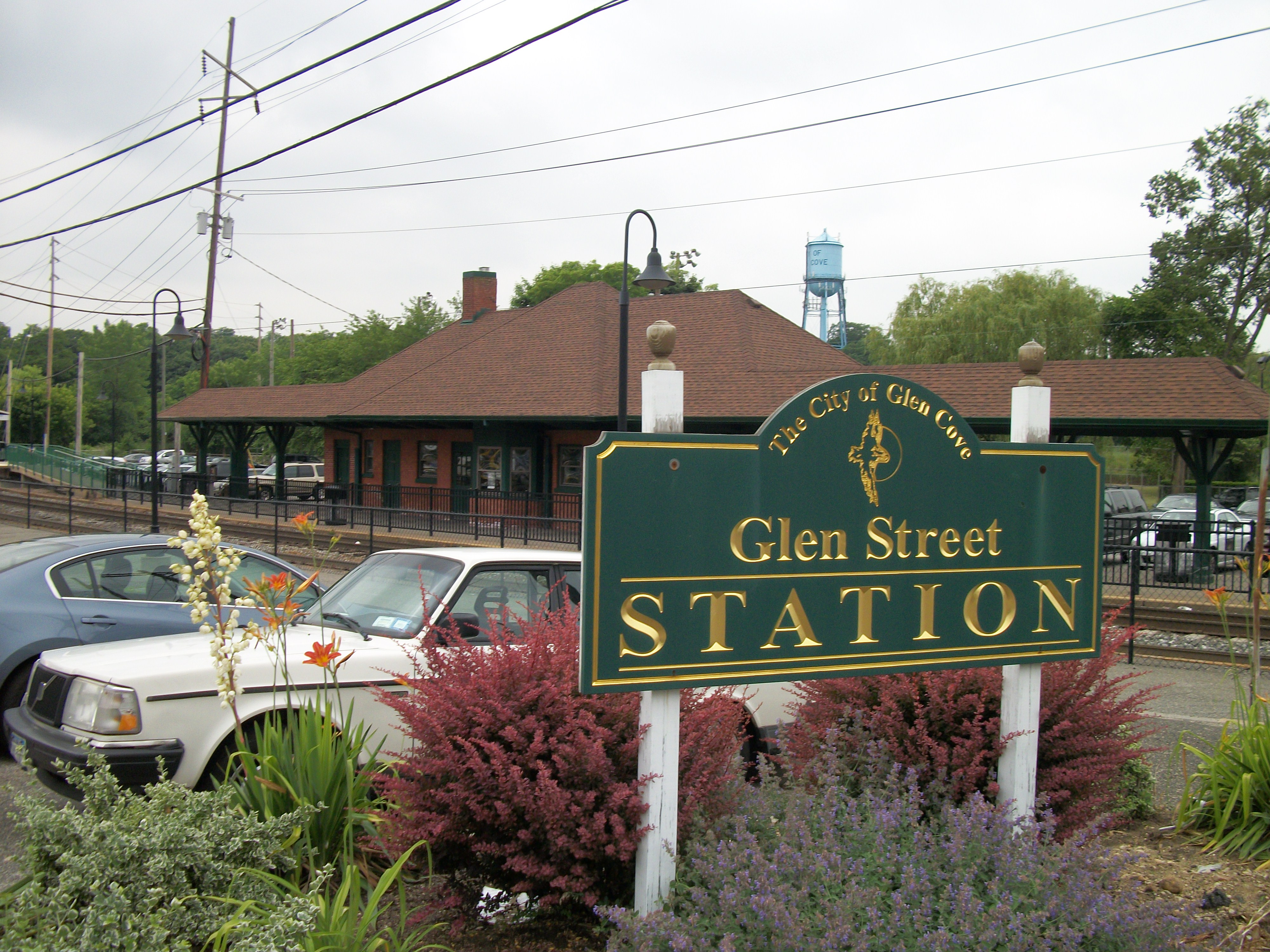
The Glen Street LIRR station in 2010

The Oyster Bay Branch of the Long Island Rail Road has three stations within the boundaries of the city: Sea Cliff, Glen Street, and Glen Cove.

=== Bus ===
==== Local bus service ====
Nassau Inter-County Express provides service on two routes: n21 (to Great Neck, except Sundays to Roslyn) and n27 (to Hempstead). There is also local service within the city.

==== Express bus service ====
North Fork Express offers weekday commuter service between Glen Cove and Manhattan with stops in Midtown and the Wall Street area.

=== Proposed ferry service ===
The city has long planned a ferry service direct to Midtown Manhattan. Although initially planned to launch in 2020, the launch of the service has been postponed due to the COVID-19 pandemic and its effect on transportation demand. The city now plans to start service if demand for ferry service returns. The city has put out a survey in 2022 to see if such demand exists.

== Landmarks ==
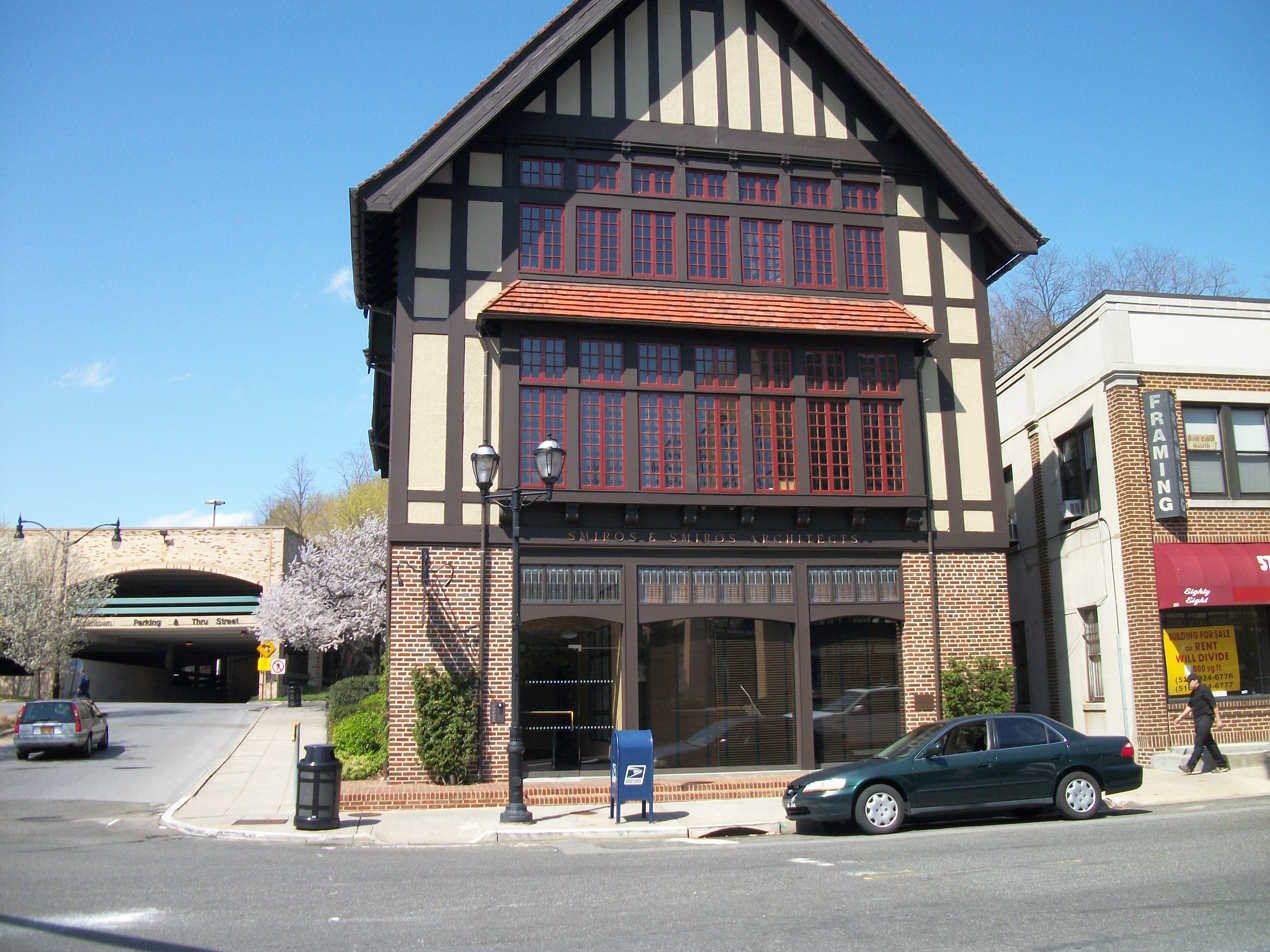
The NRHP-listed Old Glen Cove Post Office in 2011

United States Post Office

The United States Post Office at Glen Cove, built in 1932 during the Great Depression, was listed on the National Register of Historic Places in 1989.

Justice Court Building

The Justice Court Building, the former city court and later city hall and police headquarters, was added to the National Register in 1990. It has been renovated and adapted for use as the North Shore Historical Museum.

Old Glen Cove Post Office

The Old Glen Cove Post Office on Glen Street was listed on the National Register in 2010; it is now used as an architect's office.

=== Gilded Age Estates ===
==== List of Estates ====
- Cobble Court
- Winfield Hall
- Salutation

==== Pratt Estates ====
- Manor House
- Killenworth
- Welwyn
- The Braes
- Poplar Hill
- Beechwood

==== Demolished Estates ====
- Matinecock Point
- Pembroke
- Seamoor
- Alexander C. Humphreys Estate

== Notable people ==
- Laurie Bird – film actress
- Leslie Buck – businessman, designer of the Anthora coffee cup
- Roy Campanella – baseball player with the Brooklyn Dodgers
- Daniel Daly – United States Marine, double medal of honor recipient
- Howard Davis Jr. – boxer
- Dave Dictor – founding member, vocalist of MDC (Millions of Dead Cops)
- Wayne Barlowe – speculative artist and creator of Expedition
- Ashanti Douglas – singer and actress
- John Edward – psychic medium
- Whitey Ford – Yankees baseball player
- Mike Grella – professional soccer player for the Coloumbus Crew SC
- Priscilla Johnson McMillan - journalist and writer
- Carl Karilivacz – NFL player
- Robert F. Kennedy – United States Attorney general, Senator, and presidential candidate
- Nick Markakis – baseball player
- Brian Myers – professional wrestler
- Samuel Pierce - attorney and politician
- Thomas Pynchon – novelist
- Christine C. Quinn – former member of the New York City Council and former Speaker of the NYC Council, politician, activist
- Chuck Schuldiner – founding member, guitarist, and vocalist of the death metal band Death
- Susan Sensemann – artist
- Tom Suozzi – U.S. Congressman and former Nassau County Executive and Mayor of Glen Cove
- MaliVai Washington – tennis player
- Stan Wattles – racing driver

== In popular culture ==
- Sabrina (1954), starring Humphrey Bogart, Audrey Hepburn, and William Holden – scenes filmed at the Glen Cove train station
- Alfred Hitchcock's North by Northwest (1959), starring Cary Grant, Eva Marie Saint and James Mason - Lester Townsend's home, where the protagonist, Roger O. Thornhill, is held against his will and drugged with liquor, is located in Glen Cove.
- Josh Alan Friedman, a resident as a child, set his "autobiographical novel", Black Cracker (2010), in Glen Cove. The book portrays events from his childhood in the early 1960s, when he attended South School, a de facto black school. For a time, Friedman was South School's lone white student.
- Our Idiot Brother (2011), starring Paul Rudd, Zooey Deschanel, Rashida Jones, Elizabeth Banks – interior shots of mother's house were filmed at a house on Highland Rd.
- Broad City (2016) - In Season 3, Episode 6 "Philadelphia," parts were filmed at Coves Discount Liquors.
- Kevin Can Wait (2017) – In Season 1 Episode 17, Unholy War, the church scenes were filmed at Glen Cove's St. Rocco's Church.

== See also ==
- Long Beach, New York – The other of Nassau County's two cities.
- Welwyn Preserve – The former Glen Cove estate of Harold I. Pratt.
