= LuEsther T. Mertz Library =

New York Botanical Garden library

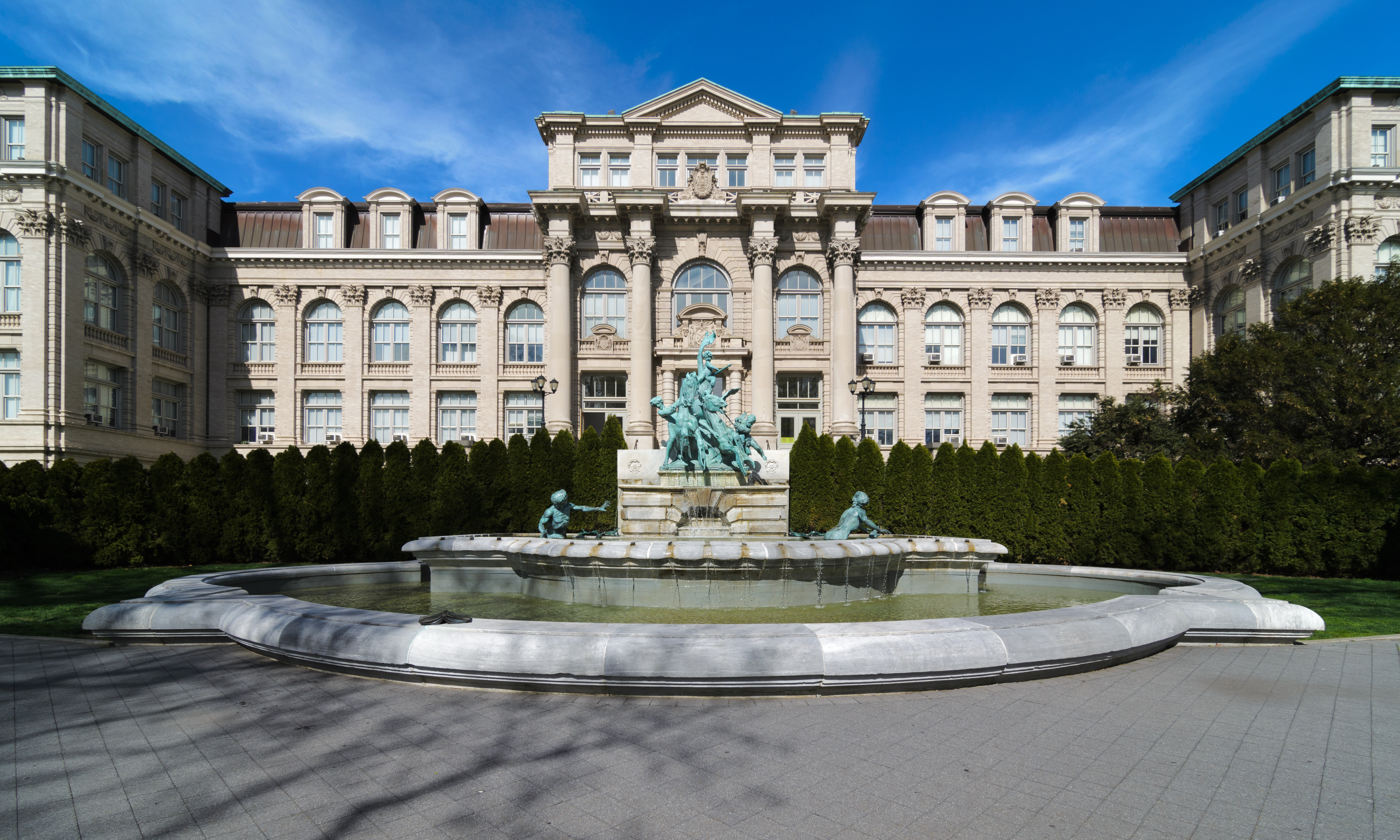
- NYBG Library Building
- 40°52′00″N 73°52′44″W
- Location: New York Botanical Garden; 2900 Southern Boulevard; The Bronx, NY 10458, United States
- Type: Research library
- Scope: Botany and related topics

Other information
- Parent organization: New York Botanical Garden
- New York Botanical Garden Library
- U.S. National Historic Landmark District – Contributing property
- New York City Landmark
- Location: Southern and Bedford Park Blvds, Bronx, New York
- Built: 1896
- Architect: Robert W. Gibson
- Architectural style: Renaissance Revival
- Part of: New York Botanical Garden (ID67000009)
- NYCL No.: 2311

Significant dates
- Designated NHLDCP: May 28, 1967
- Designated NYCL: March 24, 2009

The LuEsther T. Mertz Library is located at the New York Botanical Garden (NYBG) in the Bronx, New York City. Founded in 1899 and renamed in the 1990s for LuEsther Mertz, it is the United States' largest botanical research library, and the first library whose collection focused exclusively on botany.

The library contains large collections of books relating to botany and horticulture, and are used for studies in fields such as history, anthropology, landscape and building design, architectural history, ethnobotany, economic botany, urban social history, and environmental policy. Its holdings include current scholarly books and serials, as well as many rare and historically important works.

Robert W. Gibson designed the Renaissance Revival style building in 1896; it was finished five years later. The four-story structure, originally known as the Museum Building and later as the Administration Building, has a facade of gray-buff brick with buff terracotta. The sculptural Fountain of Life, as well as a tree-lined avenue called the Tulip Tree Allee, are located outside the front entrance. All three were included as contributing resources when the NYBG was designated a National Historic Landmark District in 1967; in 2009 they were made New York City designated landmarks.

== History ==
=== Establishment ===
An act of the New York State Legislature, passed in 1891, set aside land within Bronx Park in the north-central part of the Bronx for the creation of the New York Botanical Garden (NYBG) on the condition that a board of directors raise $250,000 ($8.08 million in today's dollars) for the site. Prominent civic leaders and financiers agreed to match the City's commitment to finance the buildings and improvements. By May 1895, sufficient funds had been raised, but the plans for the NYBG had not been finalized. The Board of Directors then asked landscape architect Calvert Vaux and his partner, Parks Superintendent Samuel Parsons Jr., to consult on site selection.

A topographical survey was completed in March 1896. As part of the topographical survey, a three-story museum with 90,000 square feet (8,400 m^{2}) of space was planned for the grounds of the NYBG, near the main entrance at Southern Boulevard and Bedford Park Boulevard. It would be the first museum in the U.S. with a collection focused specifically and exclusively on botany. The board selected the museum site for its hilltop location 1,000 feet (300 m) east of the Botanical Garden station of the New York Central Railroad (now Metro-North Railroad), which made the building easily accessible from other locations. A design contest for the museum was held, attracting firms and architects like Ernest Flagg, William Appleton Potter, N. Le Brun & Sons, Parish & Schroeder, and Clinton & Russell. Robert W. Gibson won the commission and filed building plans with the New York City Department of Buildings in November 1896. In January 1897, the city authorized the NYBG to proceed with construction of the museum.

=== Construction ===
By July 1897, construction was delayed due to disputes over whether the presence of the museum and the NYBG conservatory would detract from the naturalistic look of the rest of the garden. The magazine American Architect and Architecture, calling these objections "an unfortunate controversy", reported that the New York City parks commissioners had already hired the respective architects for the museum and conservatory, and were applying for construction funds for both projects. The New York City Board of Estimate again blocked the $500,000 appropriation in mid-September 1897, citing the concerns about the building's aesthetics and possible cost overruns, before approving it at the end of that month. A request for bids was opened, and 12 contractors submitted construction bids the following month, with the John H. Parker Company submitting the least expensive bid. After the city invalidated these bids, another request for proposals was opened. Seven contractors submitted bids, of which Parker's was again the cheapest.

A groundbreaking ceremony was held on December 31, 1897, to mark the start of construction. By May 1898, construction had started on the brick walls. By September 1898, according to The New York Times, the steel frame was 75 percent finished and the exterior walls had been built up to the second floor. The city approved the disbursement of another $200,000 in bonds that November. A contract to build the "front central portico" was carried out between July and October 1899. According to a Brooklyn Daily Eagle article in March 1900, the building had "just been completed". The NYBG's contract with John H. Parker ended the next month, with work on the end pavilions' ornamentation being delayed.

=== After completion ===
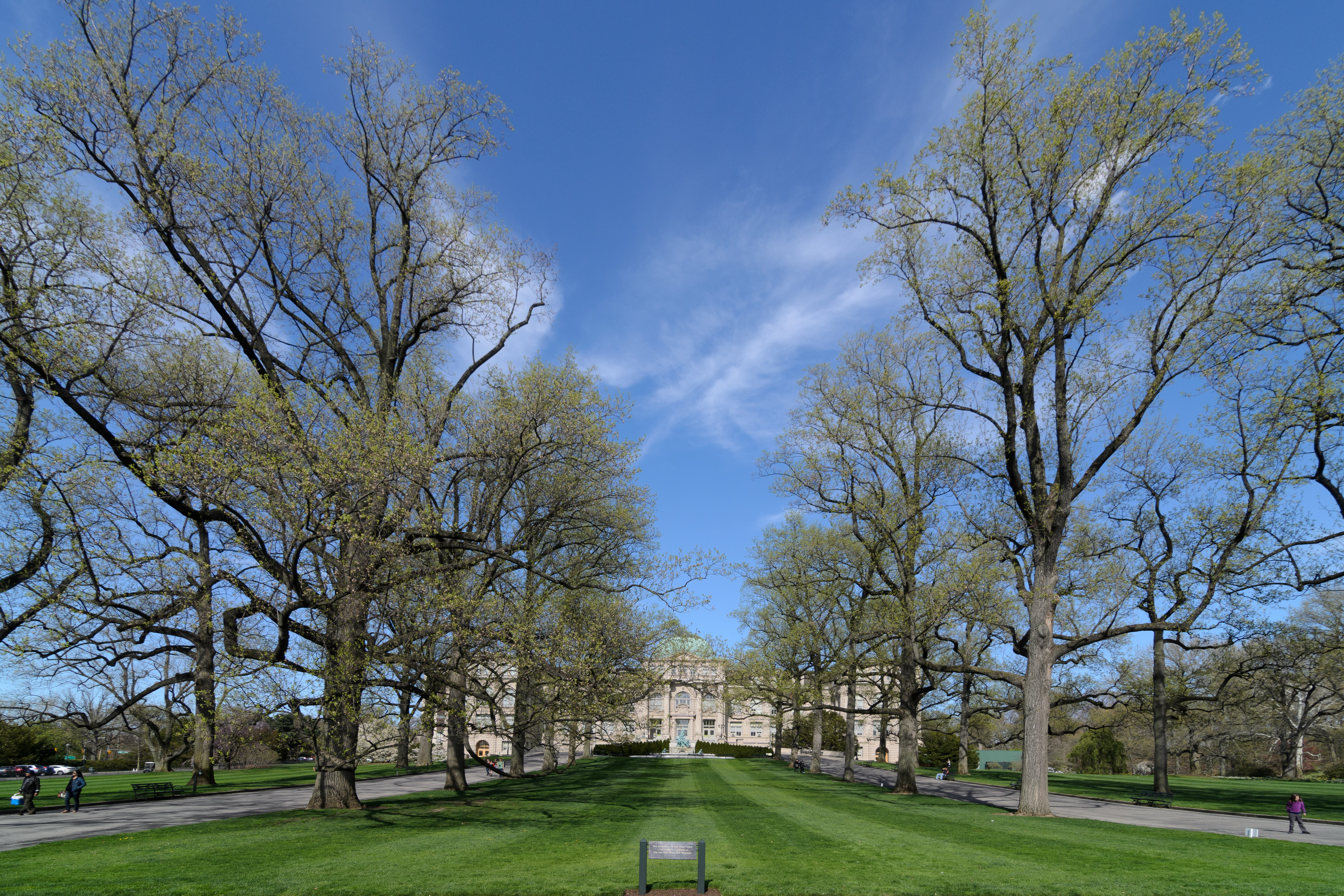
The avenue leading to the NYBG Museum's front entrance

The library initially had 2,500 volumes; in 1899, Columbia College donated another 5,000 from its botanical collection. In April 1901, Wilson & Baillie Manufacturing were contracted to build the fountain at the Museum Building's main entrance, as well as the front approaches and cornice ornamentation.

The library's collection grew over the years, and by 1926, an annex was being planned for the Museum Building. However, no progress was made on this proposal, except for the rearrangement of the building's interior. Then in 1958, Eggers & Higgins proposed a $1 million ($8.55 million in today's dollars), three-story annex behind the existing structure, with a similar design to the original building. The wing was to include classrooms, conference rooms, offices, and reading rooms. In 1964, Mayor Robert F. Wagner Jr. approved the plan, with the city and NYBG contributing equally toward the cost. The original rear wing behind the central pavilion was destroyed. The annex was dedicated as the Harriet Barnes Pratt Library Wing in late 1965, after a notable NYBG benefactor, and opened in 1966. Additionally, the original building's front staircase and its balustrade and sidewalls were renovated from 1960 to 1961.

The Science and Education Building was built between 1969 and 1972 to a design by William and Geoffrey Platt, and was dedicated to Jeannette Kittredge Watson. By February 1988, the herbarium had taken up all of the vacant space in the original structure, including rooms formerly dedicated to exhibitions. As a result, NYBG officials planned for a four-story expansion to the east of the original building's north wing, set to open in 1991. A three-month restoration of the rotunda was completed in November 1988, and a new orchid terrarium was dedicated. The addition of the northern annex was delayed in 1992, when the NYBG announced that the annex would cost $32 million ($65.8 million in today's dollars) and be completed in 1994.

A one-story annex to the south, housing the herbarium specimens, was designed by Coe Lee Robinson Roesch and finished in 1994. During the mid-1990s, (Note: The renaming might have taken place by 1997 at the latest, when a New York Times article referred to the "LuEsther T. Mertz Library".) the library was renamed after LuEsther Mertz, a major NYBG donor. When plans for the northern annex were finalized in 1997, the project was expected to cost $39 million. Polshek Partnership designed the structure, known as the International Plant Science Center. The addition comprised nine new research rooms, herbarium and library space, a new entrance to the basement lecture hall and library and the renovation of 10,000 square feet (930 m^{2}) in the existing structure. The original building's rotunda was restored as well. Construction started in 1998, and though the expansion was originally supposed to be complete in 2000, the opening was ultimately delayed until 2002. Upon the annex's opening, the library collections and the Steere Herbarium were relocated to it, and the Museum Building was renamed the Library Building.

== Design ==
The original Mertz Library building was designed by Robert W. Gibson; its main facade is 308 feet (94 m) long. The side facades, as noted in the building plans, measured 115 feet (35 m) on one end and 87 feet (27 m) on the other. Designed in the Renaissance Revival style, it consists of a central pavilion topped by a dome, with two side wings. The Mertz Library was built on uneven ground, such that the basement is at the same elevation with the ground to the east, north, and south of the library, while the first floor is level with the ground to the west.

The building has four annexes. (Note: For a diagram, see Landmarks Preservation Commission 2009, p. 28.) The International Plant Science Center is located east of the northern wing and faces Southern Boulevard to the north. The Jeannette Kittredge Watson Science and Education Building is located east of the southern wing, while a one-story annex is located to the south. The Harriet Barnes Pratt Library Wing is located behind the original building to the east of the center pavilion.

=== Facade ===
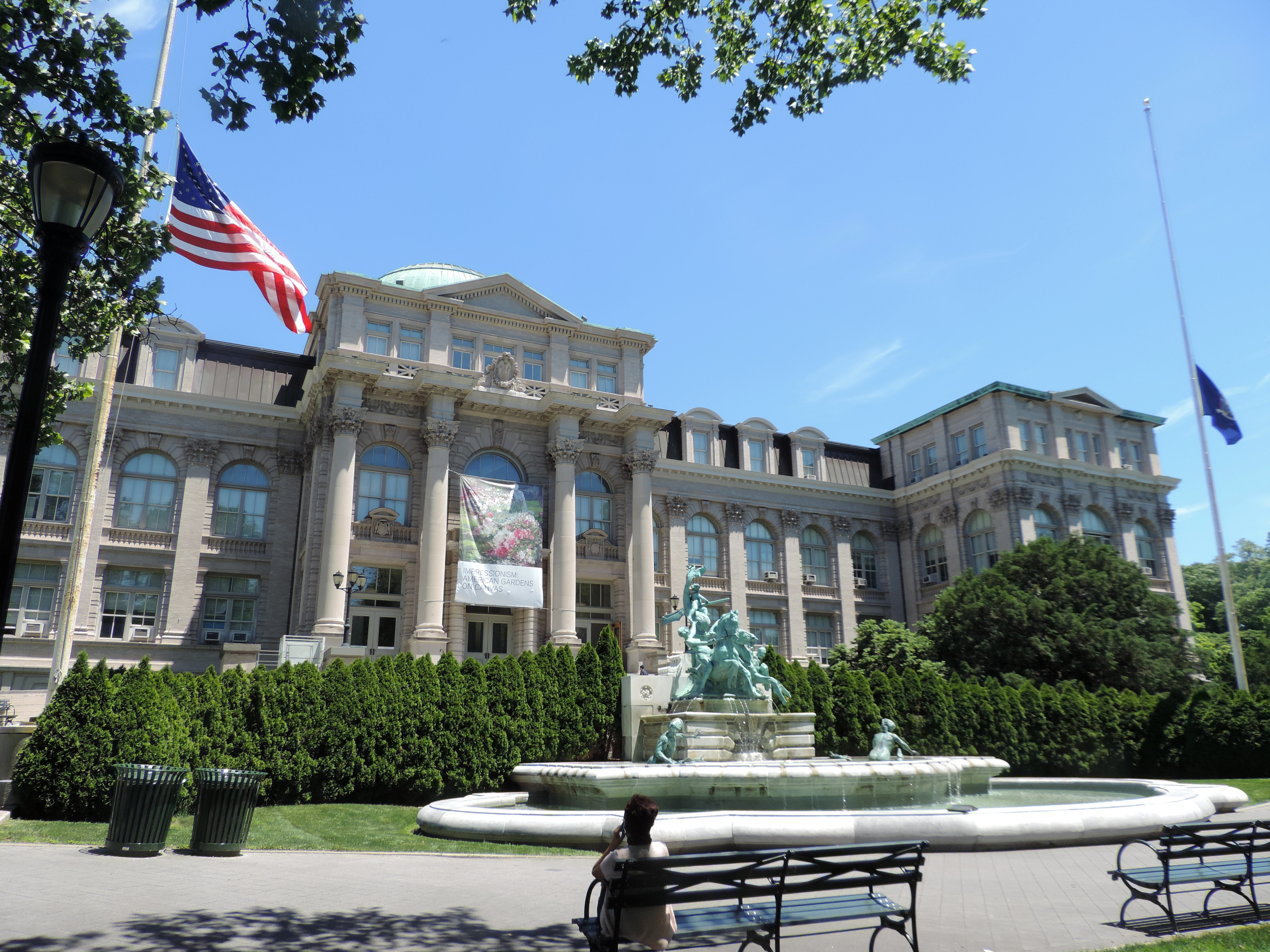
The front façade

The original building's facade consists of buff and gray brick interspersed with terracotta decoration. The windows are largely rectangular, except for those on the second floor, which contains round-arched window openings with balustrades at their bases. The third story consists of a mansard roof with dormer windows corresponding to the vertical architectural bays below them. Those bays are separated by projecting pilasters topped with Corinthian-style pediments. A cornice runs the length of the second story. A glass dome is located over the third-story rotunda, rising 36 feet (11 m) above the third floor.

On the front facade facing west, the central pavilion has rusticated stone and a pediment supported by four Corinthian columns, which divide the central pavilion into three bays. At the first floor level, there are three sets of doors, one in each bay. The end sections also have pilasters in the Corinthian style. Above the central bay is an entablature containing the seal of New York City, while smaller entablatures with the seals of New York state and the United States are located on the left and right bays. On the third story, above the center bay, there is a cartouche of the New York Botanical Garden. The steps leading to the entrance bays are made of granite, and the sidewalls are made of brick with granite coping. The pavilions on the side also contain service entrances on the first floor, located under an arched transom.

The side and rear facades are similar but contain windows on the basement as well. On the rear (east) side, four window bays on the northern portion are visible from the outside, and the four southernmost window bays are also visible. The remaining window bays cannot be seen from the outside due to the presence of the annexes. There is an entrance to the ground/basement level from the northern portion of the rear facade. The side facades to the north and south were originally five bays wide. On the south side, all five window bays are intact, but a former archway to the basement has been filled in, and a covered passageway from that arch leads to the one-story annex. On the north side, only the westernmost three bays can be seen from the outside, while the eastern two bays have been hidden by the International Plant Science Center.

==== Annexes ====
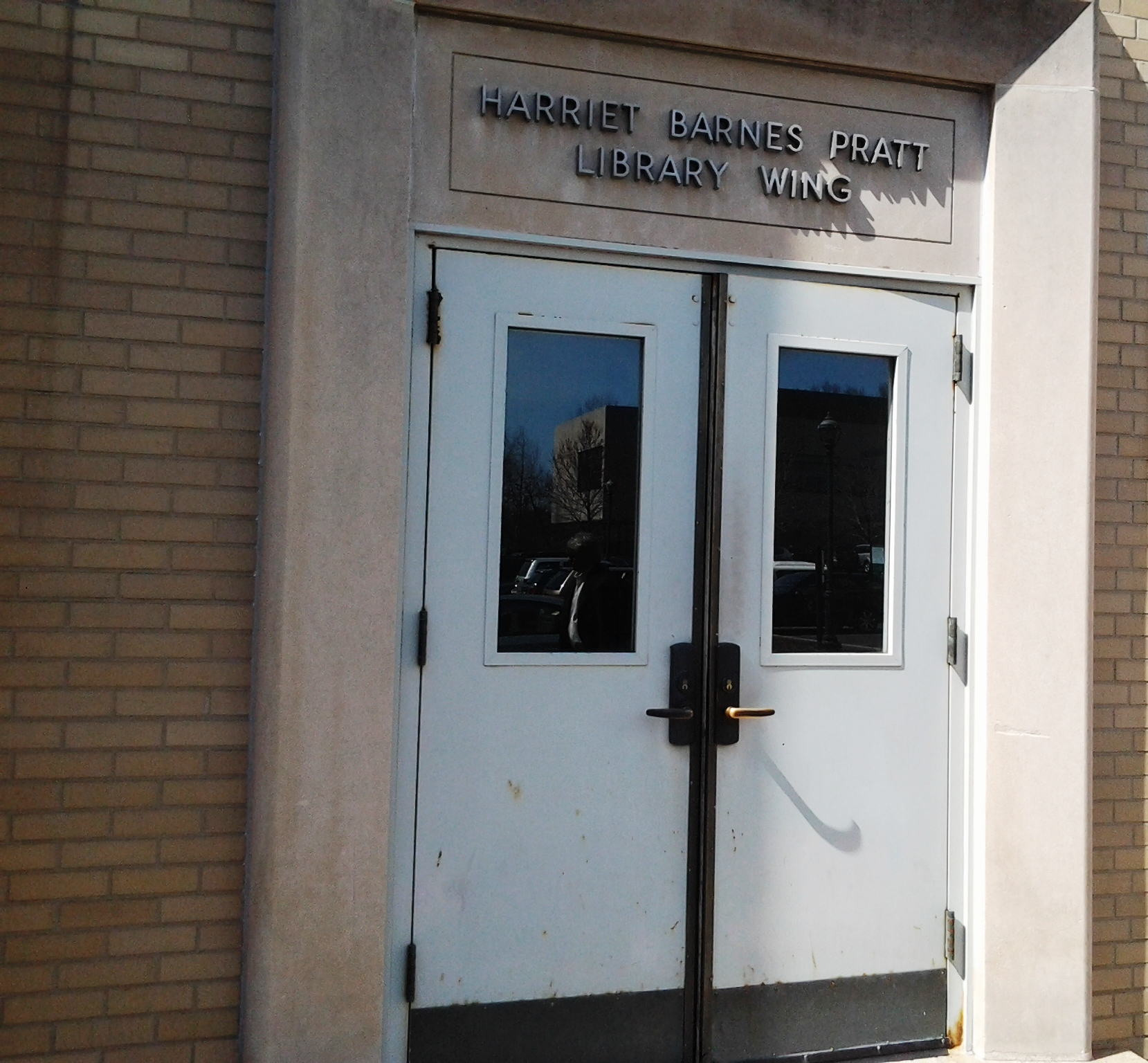
Entrance to the Harriet Barnes Pratt Library wing

The International Plant Science Center is five stories high, including the basement, and contains a windowless sand-colored facade. Original plans called for it to also include a green wall on the facade.

The Harriet Barnes Pratt Library Wing is six stories high and has a similar exterior design to the original library building.

The Jeannette Kittredge Watson Science and Education Building is four stories high. The building is constructed of steel frame with a glass facade interspersed with aluminum and green spandrels.

=== Interior ===
The original building is constructed with a steel frame and concrete floors. The basement contains the Arthur and Janet Ross Lecture Hall, which has a capacity of 400. An economic botany museum was developed on the first floor, and a general botany museum with exhibits on plant families was located on the second floor. The economic botany museum was developed in 1907 and later split into two sections: the economic/food plants and the plant-families sections. The third floor contained a library with a reading room, stacks, herbaria, and laboratories for plant embryology and taxonomy. After a 2002 renovation, the library also included a 48-foot-long (15 m) wooden reference desk and a 50-seat study room.

Since the International Plant Science Center's opening, the library collections and herbarium have been located in that building. The William & Lynda Steere Herbarium, located inside the International Plant Science Center, is one of the largest herbaria in the world, with approximately 7.2 million to 7.8 million specimens.

The Science and Education Building contains offices, educational and environmental facilities, and a greenhouse used to simulate environments for plants. It is connected to the original building by a passage at its northwest end, and is used by the NYBG's School of Professional Horticulture. Herbarium specimens are stored in the one-story annex that connects directly to the south wing of the original building.

== Associated structures ==
=== Fountain of Life ===
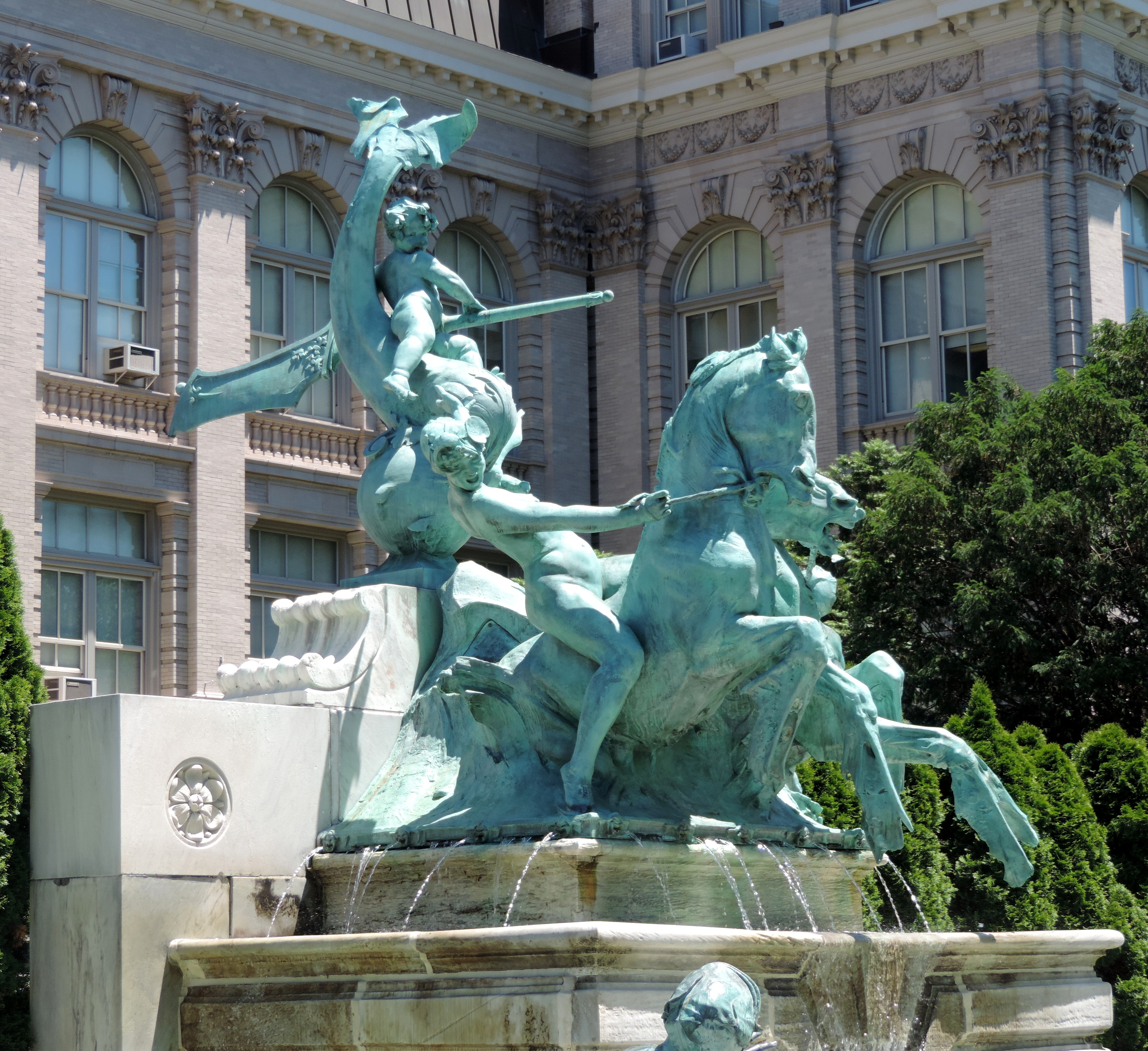
Fountain of Life

The Fountain of Life, in front of the library's main entrance, was designed by Carl Tefft and completed in 1905. The central focus of the fountain are the heroic nude sculpted figures atop a granite pedestal. These figures include two horses, both with webbed forefeet; a female sitting astride one of the horses; a boy attempting to control the other horse while holding a fish; and another boy sitting on a dolphin's back. Within the basin of the fountain is a bronze merman on a crab, and a bronze mermaid, both with startled expressions. At the time of Fountain of Life's commission, there were very few statues of horses with webbed forefeet. One observer wrote that "It was conceived in the spirit of Italian baroque fountains, with the surging movement of galloping horses and muscular riders."

The fountain and statue were included in the original plans for the Museum Building in 1897, but except for the granite pedestal, the statue was not completed with the original building in 1900. That year, NYBG held a design contest for the proposed bronze statue, but all of the submitted designs were rejected. NYBG then asked the National Sculpture Society to appoint a committee, which would review submissions for a second fountain-designing competition. Of the 15 proposals submitted in early 1903, Tefft's design was deemed the best, and he was selected for the commission. Thereafter, Roman Bronze Works of Greenpoint, Brooklyn, was selected to cast the sculpture in December 1904. The statue was completed in May 1905 and installed that July.

The Fountain of Life was initially circled by a driveway on all sides, but the western part of that driveway (in front of the fountain) was turned into an unpaved pedestrian path in 1961. The fountain was cleaned in 1968 after a period of deterioration, by which point the plinth and basin had started to crack, and the mermaid, merman, and part of the crab claw had been removed. In 2005, the mermaid, merman, and claw figures were replaced, and a bronze book was placed within the basin. At that time, the fountain was named for Lillian Goldman, a prominent donor.

=== Avenue ===
In 1901, a contract was given to Wilson & Baillie Manufacturing Company for the paving and grading of a road and tree-lined avenue leading to the museum building. This was completed in 1902. The contract also called for a seating area and a drinking fountain 16 feet (4.9 m) tall, located at the avenue's western end. These were removed in the 1950s with the construction of a laboratory building at that site. Other components of the avenue included Carolina poplars, planted in 1903, and tulip trees, planted in 1905 between each pair of poplars. The poplars were removed by 1911. The paths were re-graded in 1904 and now have benches, an asphalt surface, and concrete curbs.

== Head librarians ==
- D.T. MacDougal (acting librarian, 1899)
- Anna Murray Vail (January 1900 – September 1907)
- John Hendley Barnhart (October 1907 – December 1912)
- Sarah Harlow (January 1913 – October 1937)
- Elizabeth C. Hall (November 1937 – 1960)
- James J. Daly, Administrative Librarian (1960 – 1961)
- Robert Jones, Administrative Librarian, 1962
- Mulford Martin, Acting Senior Curator of the Library (1964 – 1965)
- John F. Reed, Curator of the Library (1965 – 1971)
- Charles R. Long, Administrative Librarian (1972 – 1986)
- John F. Reed, VP for Education and Director of the Library (November 1992 – June 2003)
- Susan Fraser, Director of the Library (2004 – 2020)
- Lawrence Kelly, Interim Director of the Library (2020 – 2023)
- Rhonda Evans, Director of the Library (2023 – Present)

== Collection ==
At the time of opening, the Mertz Library was the largest botanical library in the U.S. and one of the largest botanical libraries worldwide. A 2002 New York Times article mentioned that the library had 775,000 items and 6.5 million plant specimens in its collection. Furthermore, the Times stated that the Mertz Library had 75 percent of all systematic botany literature in the world and 70 percent of all flora that had been published, as well as the NYBG's rare-art collection. However, a book published in 2014 by the NYBG mentioned that the library had "550,000 physical volumes and 1,800 journal titles". As of 2016 the Mertz Library still contained one of the world's largest collections of botany-related texts. Stephen Sinon, who leads the NYBG's special collections, research and archives, called its collection "the largest of its kind in the world under one roof".

The collection grew both through the purchase of books and through the donation of significant botanical and horticultural libraries from notable botanists, gardeners, scientists and book collectors. Other items were collected from NYBG expeditions abroad. The items in the collection include rare plant books such as two copies of the Circa Instans (dated circa 1190 and 1275). Among the personal collections to be given to the LuEsther T. Mertz Library are donations from:

- Eleanor Cross Marquand
- Sarah Gildersleeve Fife
- Lucien Marcus Underwood
- Robert Hiester Montgomery
- Emil Starkenstein
- John Torrey
- Harriet Barnes Pratt
- David Hosack
