= Harold I. Pratt =

American businessman

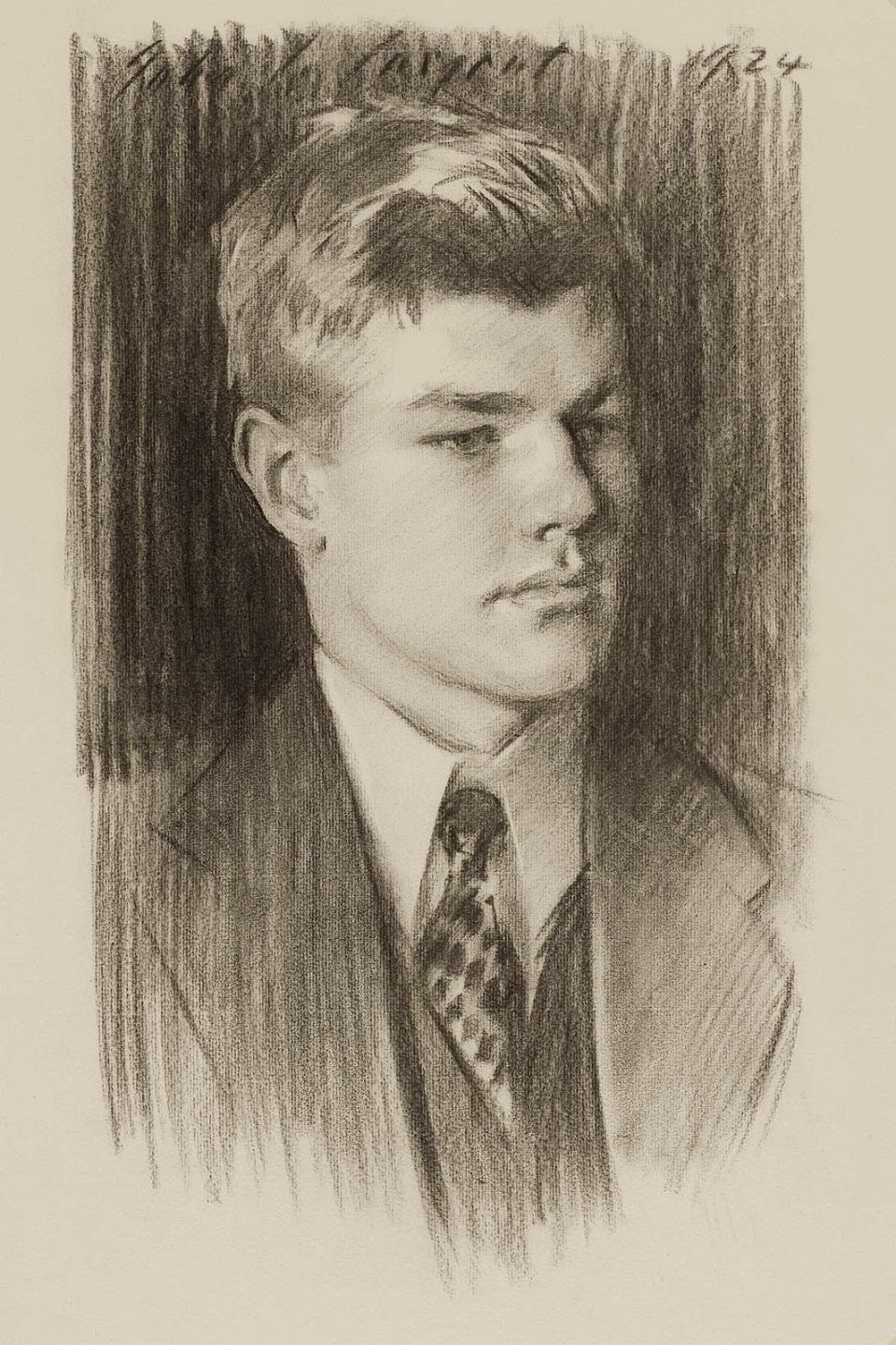
Portrait of Harold I. Pratt Jr. from 1924 by John Singer Sargent.

Harold Irving Pratt (February 1, 1877 – May 29, 1939) was an American oil industrialist and philanthropist. A director of Standard Oil of New Jersey, he also served on the Council of Foreign Relations from 1923 to 1939.

== Early life ==
He was born in Brooklyn, New York, the son of oil industrialist Charles Pratt and Mary Helen Richardson. His brothers were Frederic B. Pratt, George Dupont Pratt, Herbert L. Pratt, and John Teele Pratt; he was half-brother to Charles Millard Pratt.

Harold Pratt graduated from Amherst College.

== Career ==
Pratt became a director of Standard Oil of New Jersey, now ExxonMobil. Deeply interested in foreign affairs and issues dealing with global oil trade, he was a member of the Council on Foreign Relations from 1923 to 1939.

In terms of community activities, Pratt was president of the board of trustees of Brooklyn Hospital. His father Charles Pratt had founded the Pratt Institute in Brooklyn shortly before his death and Harold Pratt served as treasurer of the university while one of his brothers Frederic Pratt served as president.

== Legacy and honors ==
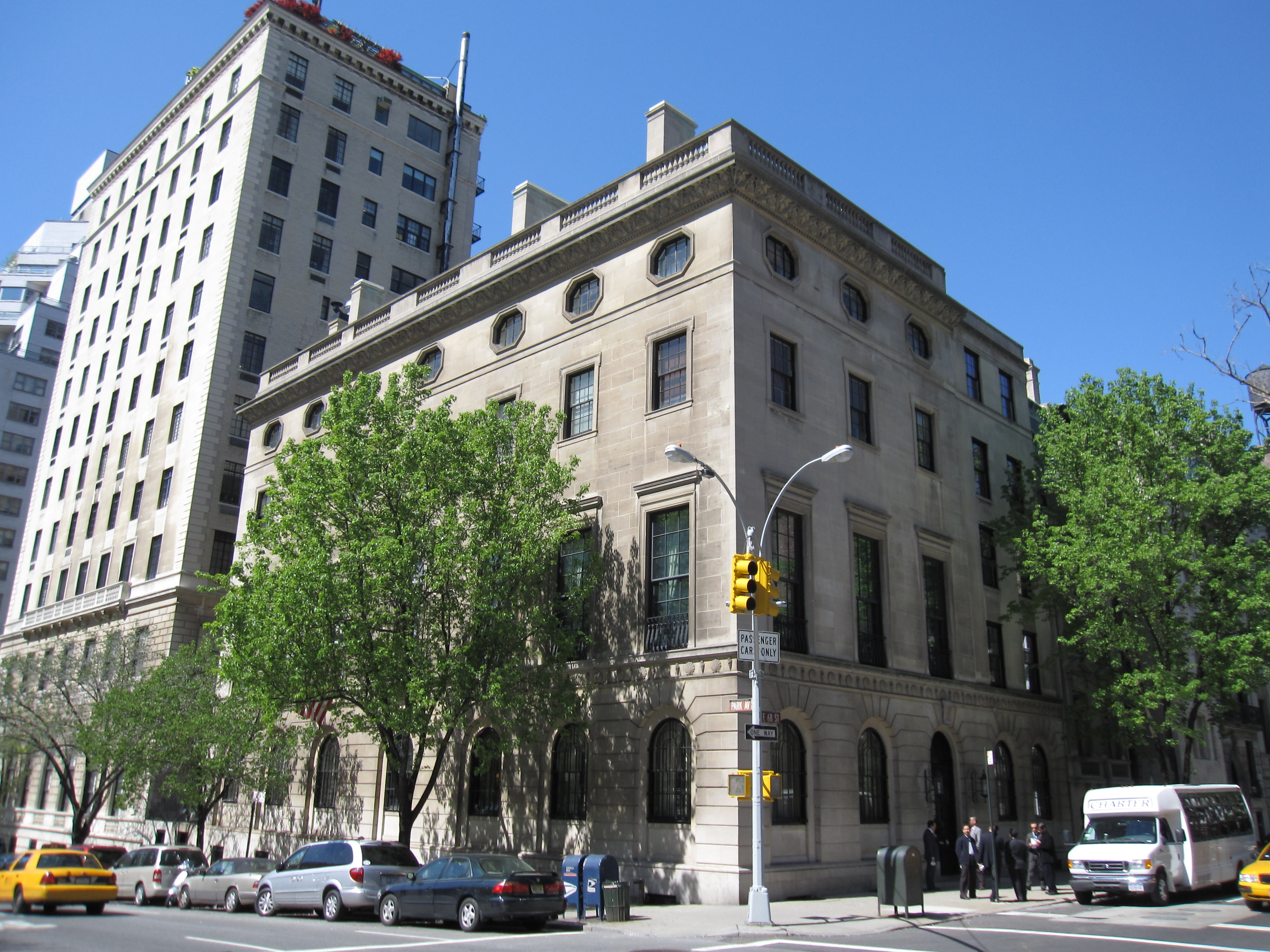
Harold Pratt House, 68th Street and Park Avenue, NY, donated by his widow as the headquarters of the Council on Foreign Relations

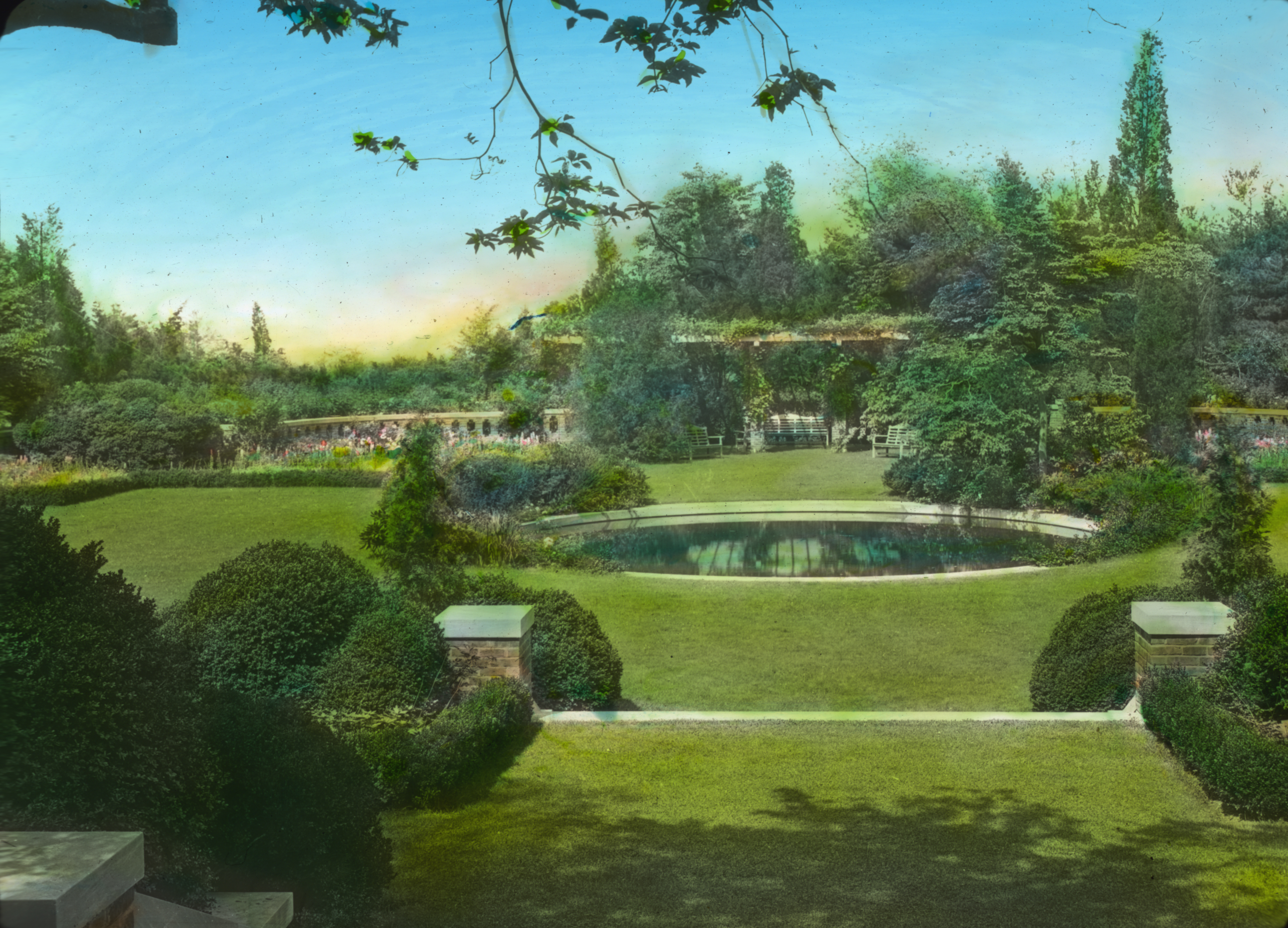
Welwyn Preserve, the gardens designed by James Leal Greenleaf in the 1890s

In 1900, Pratt donated a new natatorium (swimming pool complex) to Amherst College.

Welwyn, the family mansion designed by Delano & Aldrich, was built in 1913 at Glen Cove, Long Island. The estate's 204 acres (0.83 km^{2}) of grounds, called Welwyn Preserve, are currently owned by Nassau County and operated as a public preserve. The Holocaust Museum and Tolerance Center is currently located in the main house.

Pratt's son, Harold Irving Pratt Jr., had his portrait painted by the artist John Singer Sargent in 1924, when he was 20 years old. This artwork is now in the Museum of Fine Arts, Boston.

In World War II, a Liberty ship, number 3044, the Harold I. Pratt, was named in the senior man's honor.

In 1944, his widow, Harriet Barnes Pratt, donated the family's four-story mansion on the corner of 68th Street and Park Avenue, on the Upper East Side of Manhattan, to the Council on Foreign Relations for use as its new headquarters. Named the Harold Pratt House, this continues to serve as the center for the CFR. The limestone-clad building was designed by Delano & Aldrich in the Beaux Arts style.

== Personal life and death ==
Pratt married Harriet Barnes (1879–1969), a wealthy New York philanthropist, collector of Americana, and horticulturist. His son was Harold Irving Pratt, Jr. (1904–1975).

Pratt died at Glen Cove of pneumonia, on May 29, 1939.
