= Harriet Barnes Pratt =

American philanthropist, collector, non-profit administrator and horticulturist

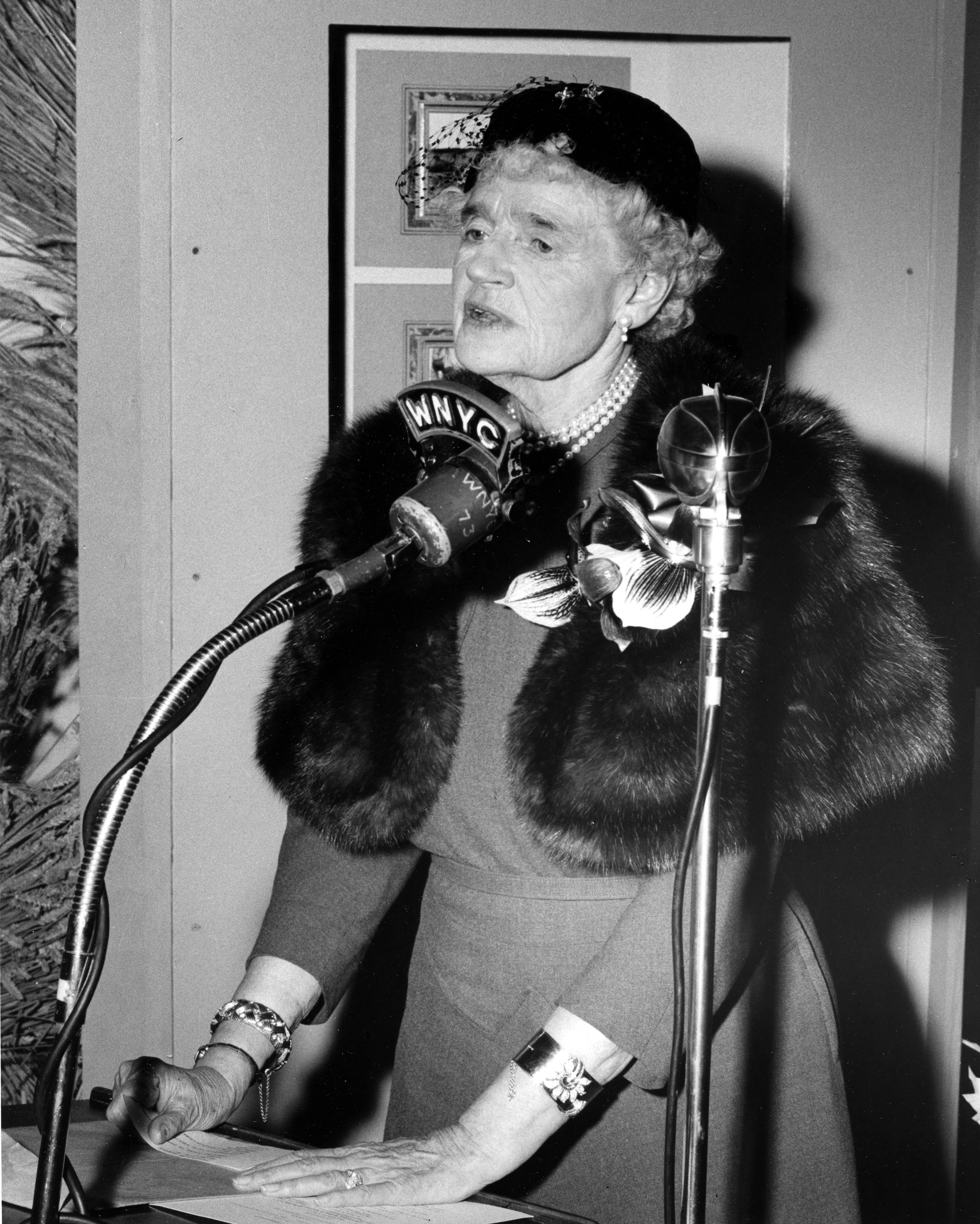
- Mrs. Pratt speaking at the dedication of the Harding Laboratory at the New York Botanical Garden on Oct. 24, 1956

Harriet Barnes Pratt (November 11, 1878 – 1969) was an American philanthropist, collector of Americana, non-profit administrator and horticulturist.

== Early years ==
Harriet Lycinthia Barnes was born on November 11, 1878, in Rockford, Illinois, the daughter of John and Mary Jane Barnes. While at Smith College she met Harold I. Pratt, who was attending Amherst College. They both graduated in 1900 and were married the following year. Her husband was the youngest son of Charles Pratt, the founder of the Pratt Institute and a founder of the Standard Oil company, now Exxon.

== Charitable work ==
In 1910, she became the first president of the Junior League of Brooklyn. In support of national efforts during World War I, she directed YMCA sponsored servicemen's canteens in the New York metropolitan area. She also worked with the Women's Land Army of America supplying women farm laborers and even forgave $2,600 in loans which she had extended them to shrink their financial deficit. During World War II, she again aided the war effort as director of the New York City Defense Recreation Committee.

Mrs. Pratt was involved with numerous other charitable endeavours including;

- The Travelers Aid Society of New York
- The Chapin School
- Community Hospital in Glen Cove
- Harvard University (especially the Fogg Museum and the Arnold Arboretum)
- Smith College
- The North Country Garden Club
- The English-Speaking Union
- The Girl Scouts of the USA
- The Seamen's Church Institute

She is known to have donated art works to The Metropolitan Museum of Art, New York, such as the Tapestry with the Annunciation.

== White House advisor ==
Mrs. Pratt served on White House advisory committees on furnishings during the presidential terms of Calvin Coolidge through to Harry S. Truman. In 1925 she was appointed as chair of the White House's first committee, by President Coolidge. Through Pratt's efforts, Eleanor Roosevelt agreed to the establishment of the Subcommittee upon Furniture and Furnishings and Gifts for State Rooms of the White House to be placed under the United States Commission of Fine Arts. Mrs. Pratt served as the subcommittee's chair and as a member until 1947. The curator of the Harriet Barnes Pratt papers notes that,

"The Pratt Papers afford the unique perspective of someone closely involved in setting policies and
making decisions relating to White House interiors and the acquisition of furnishings over three decades."

== Horticultural activities ==
The Pratt estate in Glen Cove, Long Island, Welwyn, was nationally known for its gardens. The estate is now Welwyn Preserve, part of the Nassau County park system. In keeping with the recommendation of Sir Francis Bacon that "...there ought to be Gardens for all the Months of the Year....", Welwyn contained the elements and atmosphere Bacon described. While in some instances professional help was used to lay out individual gardens, most of the planning was done by Mr. and Mrs. Pratt. He would survey the location and she would design the layout and plantings.

=== 1939 World's Fair ===
"I visited the 'Gardens on Parade' at the New York Worlds' fair this morning. They are delightful. Mrs. Harold Irving Pratt :and all the other ladies connected with the gardens were very charming... they sent me away with a sweet little corsage of :carnations, which gave off the most delicate perfume all the way back to Washington."

This personal, hands on gardening stood her in great stead as she became involved in the national gardening scene. It was, perhaps, her involvement with the 1939 New York World's Fair that brought her the greatest attention for her horticultural activities. Mrs. Pratt had conceived and created Gardens on Parade, a 5-acre area described in the Herald Tribune as "...the Most Stupendous, Most Magnificent, Most Gorgeous exhibition of flowers, shrubs and other horticultural beauties ever assembled." Pratt sold the idea for the Garden to the Fair officials, solicited involvement of individuals and organizations and did most of the fund raising. Laid out in the center of the International Section of the Fair, Gardens on Parade was "...a mammoth flower show, with the flowers growing in their natural, out-of-door element." More than fifty individual gardens were included. These covered the gamut of styles from the formality of the rose and boxwood gardens, to the naturalness of woodland, rock and perennial gardens. Specialty areas featured unusual grasses, espaliered fruit trees and tropical plants. A central, circular installation of weeping cherry trees served as the Havemeyer Memorial, in memory of the late president of the Horticultural Society of New York, Theodore A. Havemeyer. Numerous photos of the gardens can be seen at the 1939 NY World's Fair website Gardens on Parade

=== New York Botanical Garden ===
Pratt's longest continual involvement with gardening and horticulture was her involvement with the New York Botanical Garden. This began in 1915 when she first exhibited in a flower show in the Museum building. She was responsible for major developments at the Garden including:

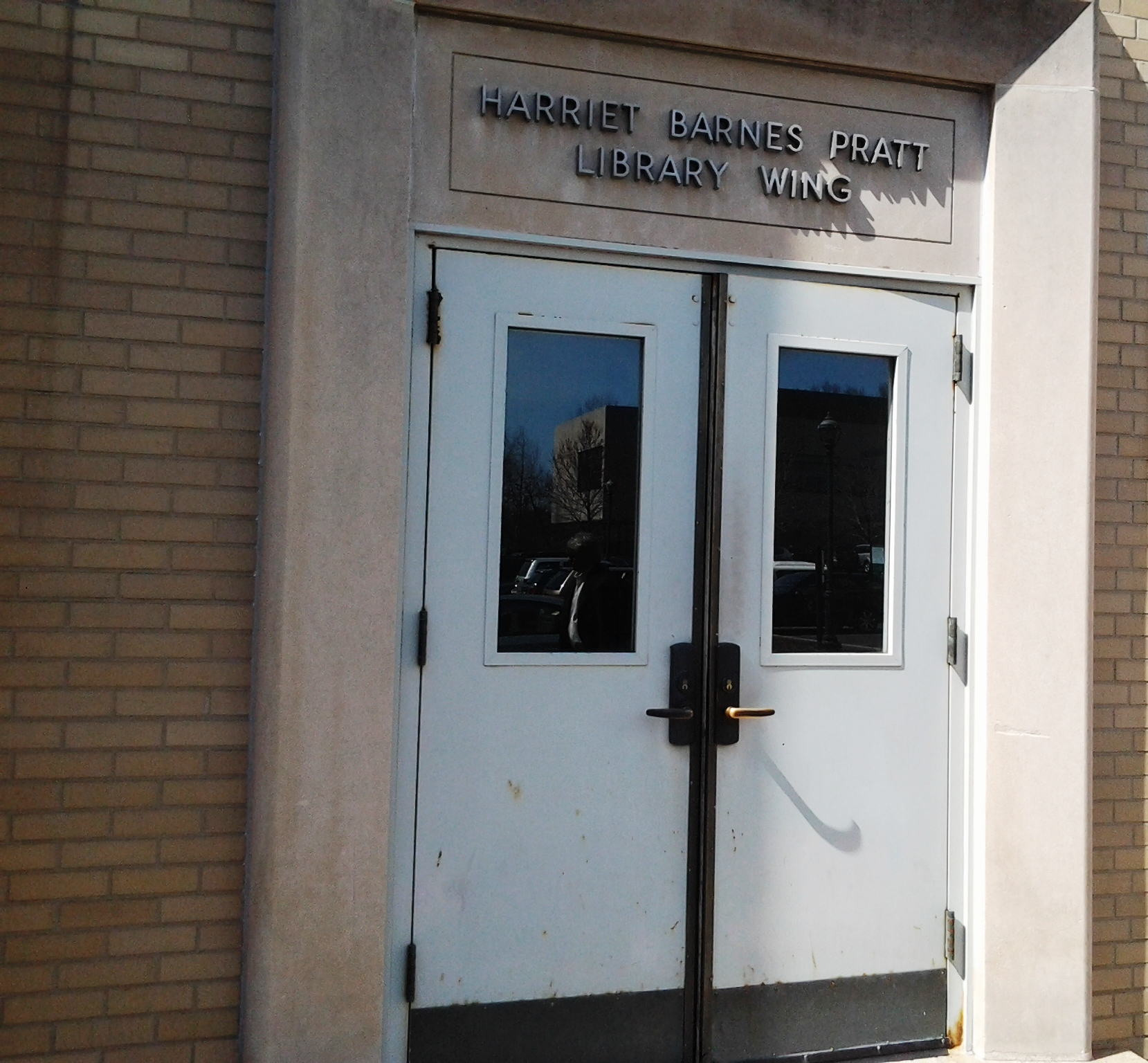
Entrance to the Harriet Barnes Pratt Library wing at the New York Botanical Garden, April 2013.

- Donation, in May of 1949, of the first tractor tram at the NYBG, "The Floral Flyer". The Floral Flyer in front of the NYBG Conservatory.
- Reconstruction of the Snuff Mill into a restaurant and meeting center in 1953.
- Completion of the Laboratory Building in 1956.
- Construction of the Harriet Barnes Pratt Library Wing at the LuEsther T. Mertz Library in 1965.

Pratt was a member of the Board of Managers of the Garden for over thirty years. In 1964, she became the first person to receive The New York Botanical Garden's Distinguished Service Award for the second time, having first one it in 1951. She was described in glowing terms when honoured as 'no words of mine can do justice to the many great contributions Mrs Pratt has made to the garden. I call her the uncrowned queen.'

In September 1944, Pratt donated 75 volumes on gardening and horticulture to the Library of the NYBG. These constitute a named collection within Library's holdings.
