= James Leal Greenleaf =

American landscape architect and civil engineer

- Born: July 30, 1857; Kortright, New York, U.S.
- Died: April 15, 1933 (aged 75); Stamford, Connecticut, U.S.
- Education: Delaware Academy; Columbia University
- Occupations: landscape architect, civil engineer, painter
- Spouse: Bertha Potts (m. 1889; died 1911)
- Children: 1

James Leal Greenleaf (July 30, 1857 – April 15, 1933) was an American landscape architect and civil engineer. Early in his career, he was a well-known landscape architect who designed the gardens and grounds of many large estates in Connecticut, New Jersey, and New York. He was appointed to the United States Commission of Fine Arts in 1918, and served until 1927. He was the landscape architect for the Lincoln Memorial (finished in 1922), and a consulting landscape architect for the Arlington Memorial Bridge (designed in 1925 and finished in 1932).

== Early life ==
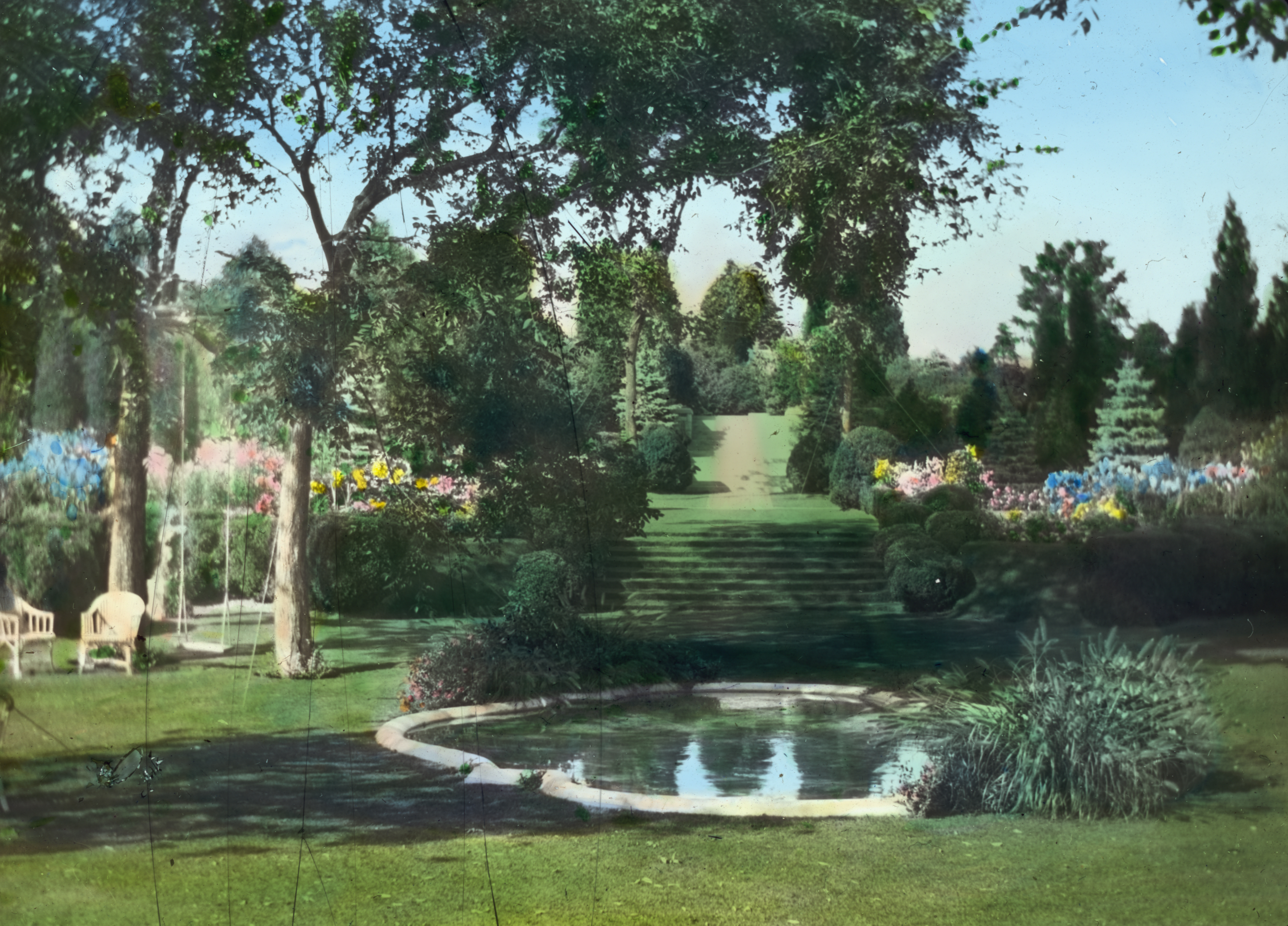
View of a portion of "Killenworth", considered Greenleaf's greatest accomplishment

Greenleaf was born in 1857 in Kortright, New York. His father, Thomas Greenleaf, was a member of the prominent Greenleaf merchant family, but had retired to Kortright due to failing health. His mother, Eleanor Leal, was of Dutch and Scottish descent. He was the fourth of five children, and the only son, born to Thomas and Eleanor. The Greenleafs were Huguenots who fled France, anglicizing their family name (Feuillevert) to Greenleaf. Greenleaf's great-great-great-great-grandfather, Edmund, was born in 1574 in Ipswich, Suffolk, England. His great-great-grandfather, Enoch, was born there in 1647, and the entire family emigrated to Salisbury, Connecticut, in 1650. His great-grandfather, Thomas, was the founder and editor of Greenleaf's New Daily Advertiser. He was a distant relative of James Greenleaf, the infamous Washington, D.C., land speculator and whose sister married Noah Webster (whose newspaper later merged with the New Daily Advertiser). Greenleaf later credited his childhood in the Catskill Mountains for giving him a love of landscape architecture.

His father's wealth enabled Greenleaf to be educated at Delaware Academy in Delhi, New York. He entered the School of Mines at Columbia University, graduating with a bachelor's degree in civil engineering in 1880. After graduation, Greenleaf was hired by the United States Census to engage in a two-year survey of water power. He worked primarily in the areas around Niagara Falls, the Mississippi River, and in Alabama.

== Career ==
Greenleaf took a teaching position as an Assistant at the Columbia School of Mines in 1882. He was promoted to tutor, instructor, and assistant professor. Increasingly engaged in the practice of civil engineering, he became an adjunct professor, and then left the school entirely in 1894 to become a full-time civil engineer.

In the late 1890s, Greenleaf turned to the practice of landscape architecture. Working primarily on Long Island and in Connecticut, New Jersey, and Westchester County, he designed estates for Frederick William Vanderbilt ("Hyde Park" in Hyde Park, New York), C. Ledyard Blair ("Blairsden" in Peapack-Gladstone, New Jersey), Mortimer L. Schiff ("Northwood" in Oyster Bay, New York), Jacob Schiff ("Seabright" in Red Bank, New Jersey), and a number of estates for the Pratt family: Pratt Oval (Charles Pratt), The Braes (Herbert L. Pratt), Welwyn (Harold I. Pratt) The Manor House (John Teele Pratt), Poplar Hill (Frederic B. Pratt), and Killenworth (George Dupont Pratt). Killenworth is considered his greatest achievement. Pratt's most visible landscape design, however, was for the Lincoln Memorial, which he did for memorial designer Henry Bacon between 1913 and 1916.

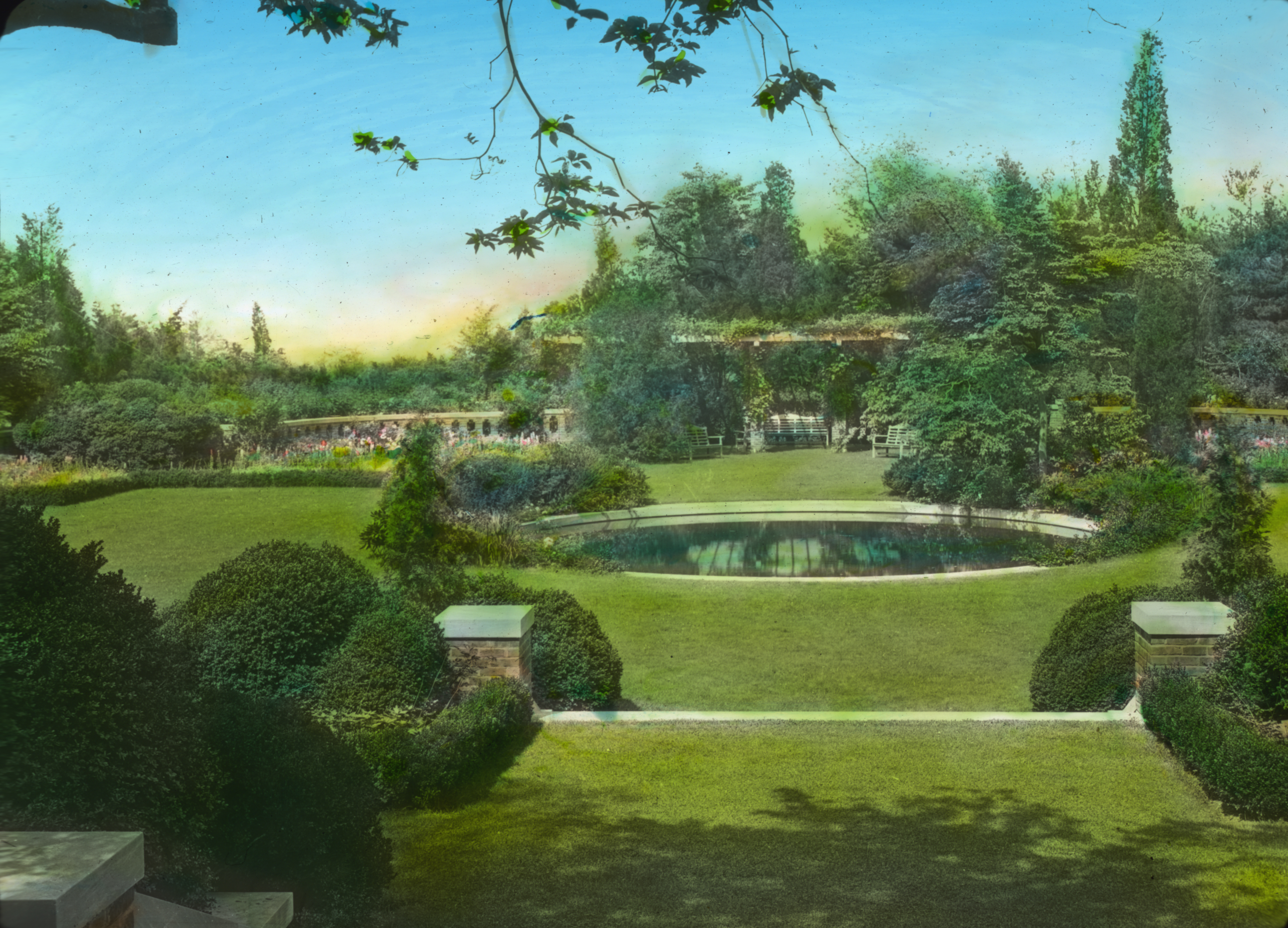
"Welwyn", the estate of Harold Irving Pratt, designed by Greenleaf in the 1890s

President Woodrow Wilson appointed Greenleaf to the U.S. Commission of Fine Arts in 1918. He served on this body, which had statutory approval authority over the design and siting of memorials and monuments in Washington, D.C., as well as advisory authority over building design in the city, until 1927. After World War I, he authored the landscape design for seven American battlefield cemeteries in France and Belgium: Aisne-Marne American Cemetery and Memorial, Flanders Field American Cemetery and Memorial, Meuse-Argonne American Cemetery and Memorial, Oise-Aisne American Cemetery and Memorial, Somme American Cemetery and Memorial, St. Mihiel American Cemetery and Memorial, and Suresnes American Cemetery and Memorial. During his time on the Commission of Fine Arts, Greenleaf consulted on landscape design in a number of national parks. In 1924, he was elected into the National Academy of Design as an Associate Academician.

After his retirement from public service in 1927, Greenleaf rarely worked. However, he did consult with the firm of McKim, Mead and White on the landscape design around Arlington Memorial Bridge in 1931 and 1932. In retirement, Greenleaf devoted himself to landscape painting, working primarily in Italy and on the Isle of Skye. His work was exhibited at the National Academy of Design in New York City.

== Personal life ==
Greenleaf married Bertha Potts of New York City on June 14, 1889. She was the daughter of George A.H. and Helen (Hard) Potts, whose wealthy mining family founded Pottsville, Pennsylvania. They had a son, Donald Leal Greenleaf, born June 5, 1890. Bertha Potts Greenleaf died in 1911.

Greenleaf was a Republican, but not active in party politics. He was a member of the Columbia University Club, the Cosmos Club, and the Century Club. He was an associate of the National Academy of Design, and served several times on juries for the American Academy in Rome. He was a long-time fellow of the American Society of Landscape Architects, and served as its national president from 1922 to 1927.

Greenleaf moved to New Canaan, Connecticut, around 1918. He contracted pneumonia in 1932, and although he recovered he remained in poor health. A few months before his death, he moved in with his son (also a resident of New Canaan). Greenleaf suffered from appendicitis, and had his appendix removed on April 3, 1933. He never recovered from the shock of the surgery, and died in Stamford Hospital in Stamford, Connecticut, on April 15.

Funeral services were held at the Congregational Church in New Canaan, and he was buried at the New Cemetery in Somerville, New Jersey.

== Bibliography ==
- Bergen, Tunis G., ed. Genealogies of the State of New York: A Record of the Achievements of Her People in the Making of a Commonwealth and the Founding of a Nation. New York: Lewis Historical Pub. Co., 1915.
- Birnbaum, Charles A. and Karson, Robin. Pioneers of American Landscape Design. New York: McGraw Hill, 2000.
- Chamberlain, Joshua L., ed. Universities and Their Sons: History, Influence and Characteristics of American Universities, With Biographical Sketches and Portraits of Alumni and Recipients of Honorary Degrees. Boston: R. Herndon Co., 1899.
- Greenleaf, James Edward. Genealogy of the Greenleaf Family. Boston: F. Wood, Printer, 1896.
- Griswold, Mac; Weller, Eleanor; and Rollins, Helen E. The Golden Age of American Gardens: Proud Owners, Private Estates, 1890-1940. New York: H.N. Abrams, 2000.
- Kohler, Sue A. The Commission of Fine Arts: A Brief History, 1910-1995. Washington, D.C.: United States Commission of Fine Arts, 1996.
- Sclare, Liisa and Sclare, Donald. Beaux-Arts Estates: A Guide to the Architecture of Long Island. New York: Viking Press, 1980.
- Snyder, Alan K. Defining Noah Webster. Washington, D.C.: Allegiance Press, 2002.
- The Studio Yearbook of Decorative Art. New York: Viking Press, 1916.
- Zaitzevsky, Cynthia. Long Island Landscapes and the Women Who Designed Them. New York: Society for the Preservation of Long Island Antiquities, 2009.
