= The Manor (Glen Cove, New York) =

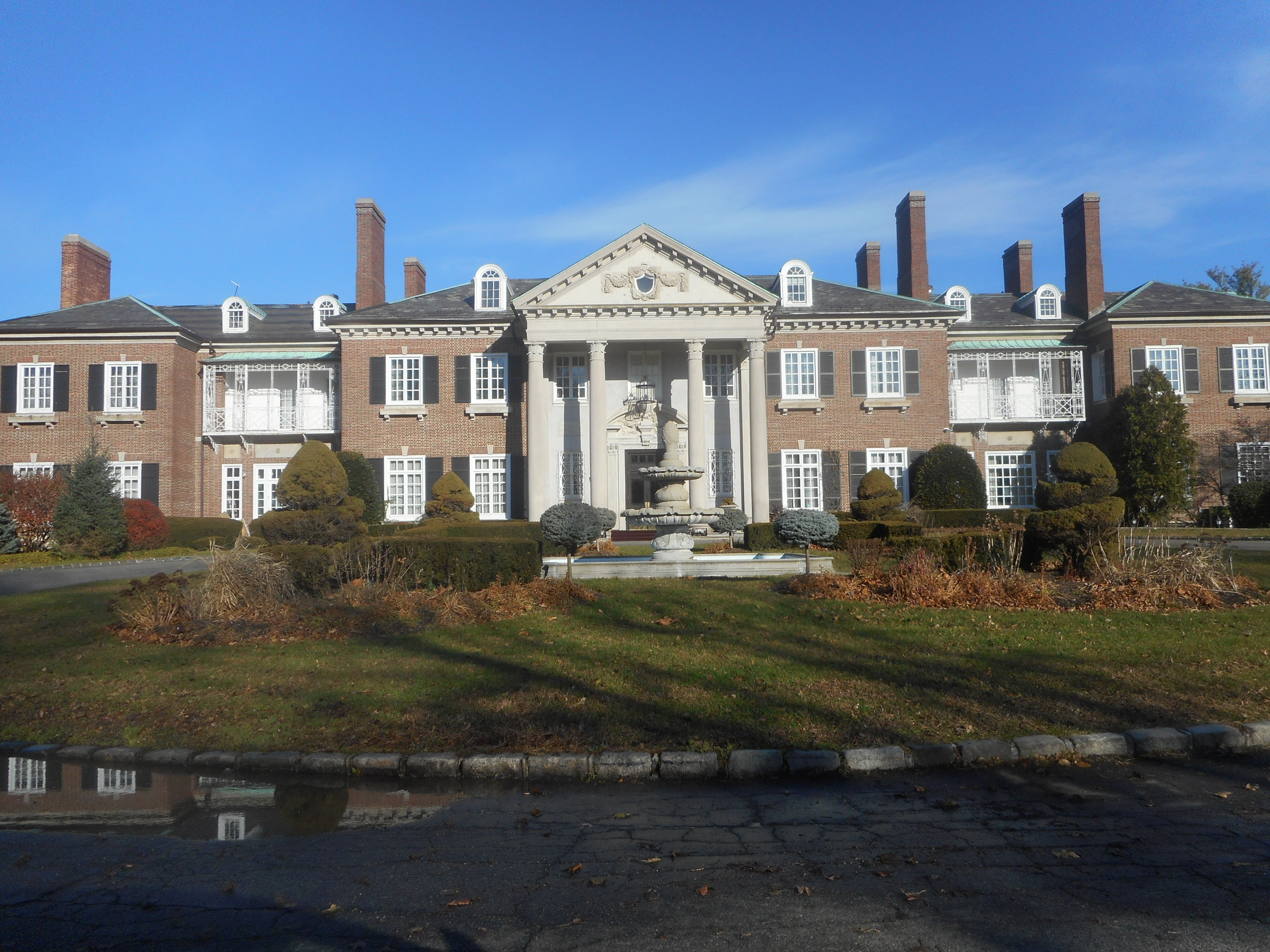
- Close-up shot of The Manor, November 2019
- Interactive map of the The Manor area
- Former names: Harrison House
- Alternative names: Glen Cove Mansion Hotel and Conference Center

General information
- Type: Mansion
- Architectural style: Georgian
- Location: 200 Dosoris Lane, Glen Cove, New York, United States
- Coordinates: 40°53′08″N 73°37′44″W
- Completed: 1910

Design and construction
- Architect: Charles A. Platt

The Manor is a historic mansion in Glen Cove, New York. It was constructed in 1910 as the home of John Teele Pratt and Ruth Baker Pratt. It was designed by Charles A. Platt.

After the death of Ruth Pratt in 1965, it became one of the first conference center hotels in the United States in 1967. It was known as Harrison House until 1985, when it was renamed the Glen Cove Mansion Hotel and Conference Center.

The Manor is one of five existing mansions in Glen Cove built for the sons of oil magnate Charles Pratt. The others are "The Braes", now the Webb Institute of Naval Architecture; "Welwyn", now the Holocaust Memorial and Tolerance Center of Nassau County on the grounds of the Welwyn Preserve; "Poplar Hill", now the Glengariff Healthcare Center, and "Killenworth", now the country retreat of the Russian delegation to the United Nations.
