= Ruth Baker Pratt =

American politician (1877–1965)

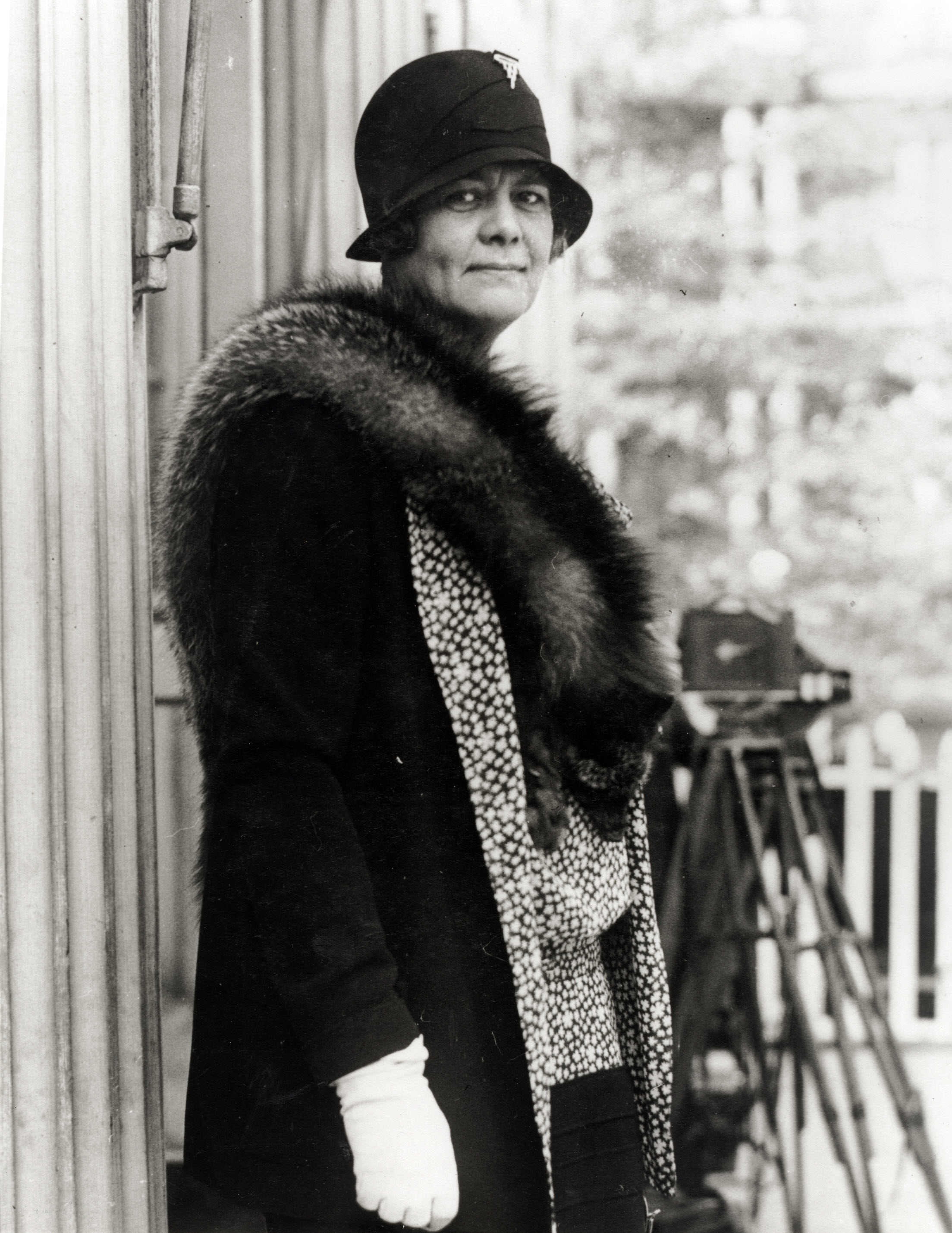

Member of the U.S. House of Representatives from New York's 17th district
- In office March 4, 1929 – March 3, 1933
- Preceded by: William W. Cohen
- Succeeded by: Theodore A. Peyser

Personal details
- Born: Ruth Sears Baker; August 24, 1877 Ware, Massachusetts, U.S.
- Died: August 23, 1965 (aged 87) Glen Cove, New York, U.S.
- Party: Republican
- Spouse: John Teele Pratt (m. 1904; died 1927)
- Children: 5, including Edwin
- Education: Wellesley College

Ruth Sears Pratt (née Baker; August 24, 1877 – August 23, 1965) was an American politician and the first female U.S. representative to be elected from New York.

== Early life ==
On August 24, 1877, Pratt was born as Ruth Sears Baker in Ware, Massachusetts to Carrie V. Baker and Edwin H. Baker, a cotton manufacturer.

Pratt attended Dana Hall. Pratt studied mathematics at Wellesley College. She also spent a year and a half studying violin at the Conservatory of Liege, Belgium.

== Career ==
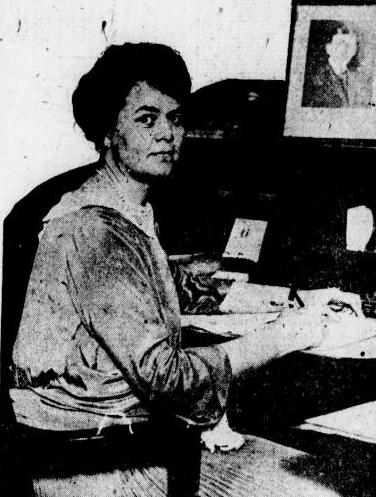
Mrs. Pratt in 1920

In the 1920 presidential election, Pratt was a presidential elector for Warren G. Harding and Calvin Coolidge. In 1924, she supported and drew in women's support for Frank J. Coleman Jr. candidacy for leadership of the Fifteenth Assembly District; Pratt was later made associate leader of the District before she became secretary. She was a member of the Board of Aldermen of New York City in 1925, being the first woman to serve; re-elected in 1927 and served until March 1, 1929. She was a member of the Republican National Committee 1929-1943; delegate to the Republican National Conventions in 1924, 1932, 1936, 1940; delegate to the Republican State conventions in 1922, 1924, 1926, 1928, 1930, 1936, and 1938. She served as president of the Women's National Republican Club from 1943 to 1946.

She was elected as a Republican to the 71st and 72nd Congresses (1929–1933), being the first woman elected to Congress from New York, beating out her primary competitor Phelps Phelps. In 1932, Ruth lost reelection to Democrat Theodore Peyser.

=== Pratt-Smoot Act ===
Together with Reed Smoot, she introduced the Pratt-Smoot Act, passed by the United States Congress, and signed into law by President Herbert Hoover on March 3, 1931. The Act provided $100,000, to be administered by the Library of Congress, to provide blind adults with books. The program, which is known as Books for the Blind, has been heavily amended and expanded over the years, and remains in place today.

=== Electoral history ===
New York's 17th congressional district election, 1928
| Party | Candidate | Votes | % |
|---|---|---|---|
| Republican | Ruth Baker Pratt | 36,655 | 51.83 |
| Democratic | Philip Berolzheimer | 32,466 | 45.91 |
| Socialist | Bertha Maily | 1,600 | 2.26 |
| Total votes | | 70,721 | 100.00 |
| Republican gain from Democratic | | | |

New York's 17th congressional district election, 1930
| Party | Candidate | Votes | % |
|---|---|---|---|
| Republican | Ruth Baker Pratt (incumbent) | 39,826 | 43.32 |
| Democratic | Louis B. Brodsky | 38,436 | 41.80 |
| Socialist | Heywood Broun | 13,682 | 14.88 |
| Total votes | | 91,944 | 100.00 |
| Republican hold | | | |

New York's 17th congressional district election, 1932
| Party | Candidate | Votes | % |
|---|---|---|---|
| Democratic | Theodore A. Peyser | 36,397 | 52.90 |
| Republican | Ruth Baker Pratt (incumbent) | 29,776 | 43.28 |
| Socialist | Alexander Kahn | 2,092 | 3.04 |
| Law Preservation | George H. Mann | 541 | 0.79 |
| Total votes | | 68,806 | 100.00 |
| Democratic gain from Republican | | | |

== Personal life ==
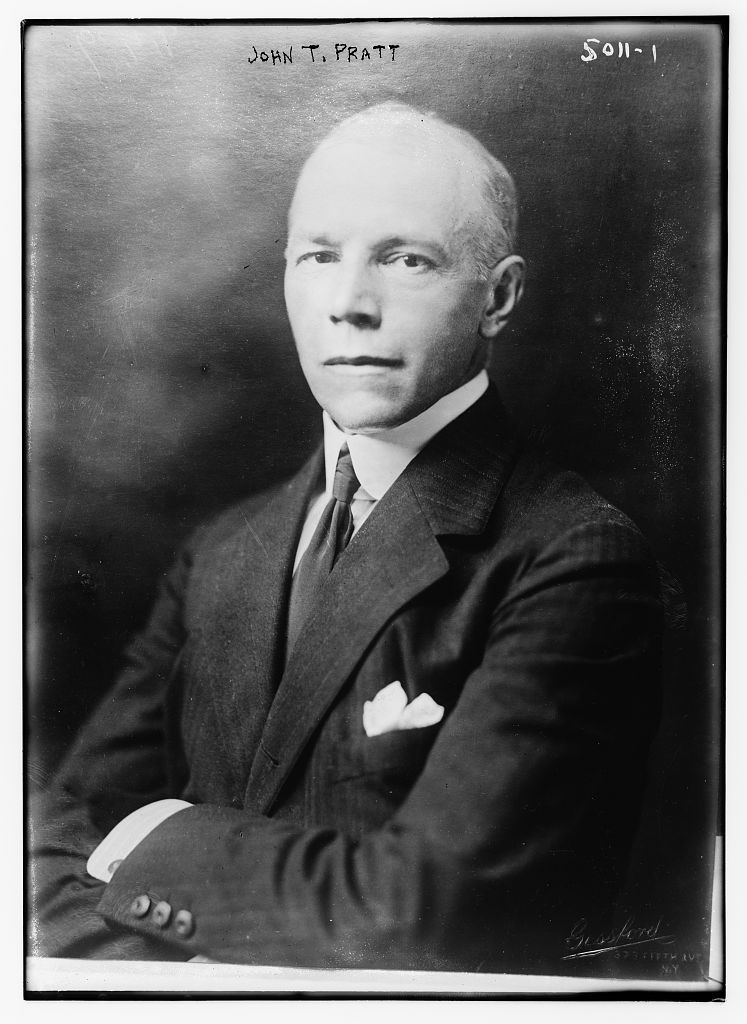
Her husband, John Teele Pratt, in 1919

In 1904, she married John Teele Pratt, a corporate attorney, philanthropist, music impresario, and financier. He was one of six children born to industrialist and Standard Oil co-founder Charles Pratt and Mary Helen (née Richardson) Pratt. His siblings included brothers Frederic, George, Herbert, and Harold. From his father's first marriage, he had two half-siblings including Charles Millard Pratt. He died in 1927, leaving her a large fortune. Together, they had five children:

- John Teele Pratt Jr. (1903–1969), who was married to Mary Christy Tiffany, the daughter of George Shepley Tiffany. They divorced and he later married Elizabeth Ogden Woodward, the daughter of William Woodward Sr. and the former wife of Robert Livingston Stevens Jr. After his death, she married Alexander Cochrane Cushing, founder of Squaw Valley Ski Resort.
- Virginia Pratt (1905–1979), who married Robert Helyer Thayer, a U.S. Minister to Romania, in 1926.
- Sally Sears Pratt (1908–1973), who married James Tracy Jackson III in 1928.
- Phyllis Pratt (1912–1987), who married Paul Henry Nitze, the Secretary of the Navy and Deputy Secretary of Defense under President Lyndon B. Johnson.
- Edwin Howard Baker Pratt (1913–1975), the headmaster of Browne & Nichols school, who married Aileen Kelly.

== Death ==
Pratt died on August 23, 1965, at the family house and estate, Manor House, Glen Cove, Long Island; she was one day shy of her 88th birthday. She was interred at the Pratt Family Mausoleum, Old Tappan Road, Glen Cove.

== Descendants ==
Through her eldest son John, she was a grandmother of Mary Christy Pratt (1923–1960), who was married to Bayard Cutting Auchincloss (1922–2001), the nephew of U.S. Representative James C. Auchincloss, in 1950, and Ruth Pratt, who in 1962 married U.S. State Department aide, R. Campbell James, a Groton and Yale graduate who was a stepson of architect Harrie T. Lindeberg. Through her daughter Phyllis, she was a grandmother of William A. Nitze of Washington, DC, the chairman of Oceana Technologies and Clearpath Technologies, who married Ann Kendall Richards, an independent art dealer. She was also, through her daughter Phyllis, the great grandmother of Nicholas Thompson, the CEO of The Atlantic. Through her youngest son Edwin, she was a grandmother to singer-songwriter Andy Pratt.

== See also ==
- Women in the United States House of Representatives

U.S. House of Representatives
| Preceded by William W. Cohen | Member of the U.S. House of Representatives from New York's 17th congressional district 1929–1933 | Succeeded by Theodore A. Peyser |
