= Edwin Pratt =

Edwin Pratt may refer to:

- Edwin T. Pratt (1930–1969), American civil rights activist
- Edwin H. Baker Pratt (1913–1975), American educator and headmaster of Buckingham Browne & Nichols
- Edwin Hartley Pratt (1849–1930), American homeopath and founder of orificial surgery
- E. J. Pratt (1882–1964), Canadian poet
