= Charles Millard Pratt =

American businessman (1855–1935)

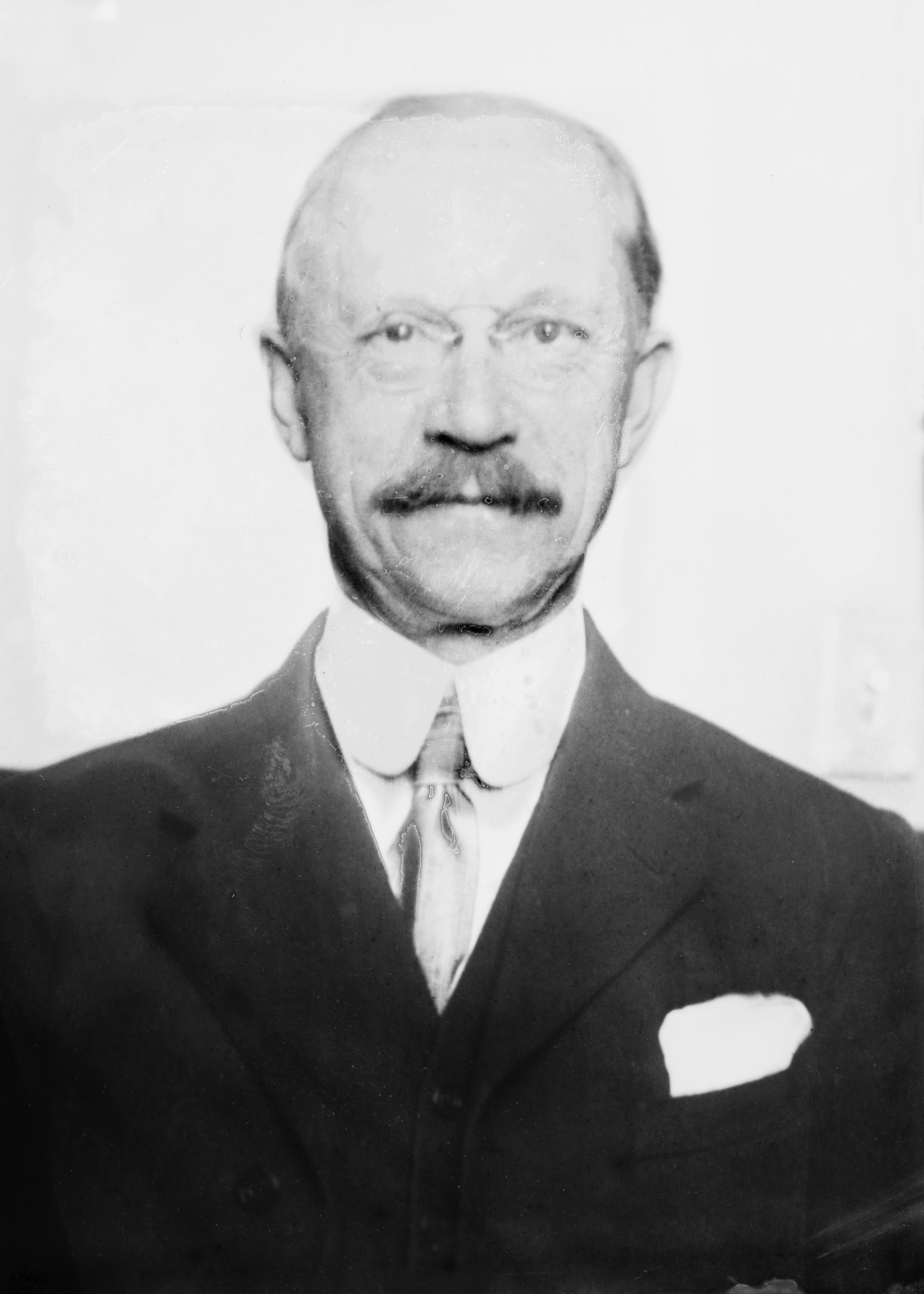
- Pratt in c. 1915
- Born: November 2, 1855
- Died: November 27, 1935 (aged 80); Glen Cove, New York, U.S.
- Education: Amherst College
- Occupations: Financier, businessperson, educator, philanthropist
- Employer(s): Charles Pratt and Company, Standard Oil
- Board member of: Standard Oil
- Spouse: Mary Seymour Morris
- Children: 5
- Parents: Charles Pratt (father); Lydia Ann Richardson (mother)

Charles Millard Pratt (November 2, 1855 – November 27, 1935) was an American oil industrialist, educator, and philanthropist. As the eldest son of industrialist Charles Pratt, in 1875 he began working at Charles Pratt and Company, soon becoming president.

He was a director of the Standard Oil Company and later a president of the Pratt Institute in Brooklyn. A philanthropist, he donated large sums to Vassar College and Amherst College, among other institutions.

== Early life and education ==
Pratt was born on November 2, 1855 in Brooklyn. He was raised on the Pratt family estate at 232 Clinton Avenue in the Clinton Hill district. Pratt was the eldest son of Charles Pratt and Lydia A. Richardson. His father married again, after the death of his first wife, to Mary Richardson. Charles had five younger half-brothers: Frederic B. Pratt, George Dupont Pratt, Herbert L. Pratt, John Teele Pratt and Harold I. Pratt, and one half-sister.

He graduated from Adelphi Academy in 1875 and from Amherst College in the class of 1879. In 1880 at the age of 24, he was living at the family estate in Clinton Hill with his six younger siblings.

== Career ==
In 1875, Pratt began his business career at one of the family businesses, Charles Pratt & Co, a financial firm started by his father. He later became its president. Pratt joined Standard Oil in 1879. He was a director and secretary at Standard Oil from 1899 to 1911, and treasurer from 1908 to 1911. For years he was also president of the Pratt Institute in Brooklyn, contributing greatly to its endowment.

For a time, he was a vice president of the Long Island Rail Road. He also held directorships in other companies, including the Brooklyn City Railroad and American Express. In March 1900, Pratt was re-elected a director of the United States Mortgage and Trust Company, to serve three years. Prior to 1923, he was a trustee of the Atlantic Mutual Insurance Company, president and director of The Thrift, and director of the Union Mortgage Company, Chelsea Fibre Mills, Hoagland Laboratories, Pratt & Lambert, Self-Winding Clock Company, and others.

In May 1923, Justice Stephen Calaghan of the Kings County Supreme Court confirmed “findings of a special sheriff's jury” that Pratt was unable to conduct his business. The New York Times reported that this was due to his "age," likely a euphemism for dementia or another variant of cognitive impairment. His wife and two living sons were named a committee of the person to represent him. According to the report, the condition manifested in December 1922.

== Philanthropy ==
He was president of the Pratt Institute's board of trustees, as well for a time of the Adelphi Academy. He was a trustee of Amherst College and Vassar College. He was a director of the Brooklyn Bureau of Charities and other charitable entities.

He personally contributed funds to Adelphi Academy, Emmanuel Baptist Church in Brooklyn, and Amherst and Vassar. For example, as a trustee of Vassar from 1896 to 1920, he contributed more than $800,000, which enabled development of the college's outdoor theatre, artificial lake, and landscape gardens. The New York Times said the gardens “made its campus famous throughout the country.” Pratt House at Vassar, a residence for the warden (a variegated administrative role encompassing student affairs duties), was completed in 1915 by architects York and Sawyer. Pratt also contributed to the endowment and the building of structures at the Pratt Institute. In 1910, he and his five brothers and a sister gave $1,750,000 to the institute.

As a trustee of Amherst from 1897 and 1921, Pratt contributed funds for a gymnasium, dormitory, and other buildings. He was the first alumnus to donate a building to Amherst College—the Pratt Gymnasium was erected in 1883, and was reconstructed as the Pratt Museum in 1942. Following further rebuilding, it reopened in August 2007 as the Charles M. Pratt Dormitory. Pratt was also responsible for the Morris Pratt Dormitory at Amherst College in 1911, in memory of his son Morris, who died at Amherst while an undergraduate student.

== Personal life ==
He was married to Mary Seamoor Morris Pratt, daughter of Governor of Connecticut Luzon B. Morris. He and Mary Seymour Morris had five children:

- Morris Pratt (November 29, 1885 – July 15, 1910)
- Theodore Pratt (May 21, 1887 – June 1977) married Laura Merrick on June 2, 1910. They had three children, Gwendolyn Pratt (October 27, 1917 – October 31, 1917), Theodore Pratt Jr.(June 16, 1920 – January 15, 1998), and Merrick Pratt (born June 4, 1922 - July 3, 2014).
- Margaret Richardson Pratt (July 19, 1889 – January 20, 1919) married Frank J Frost. They had two children, Morris Pratt Frost (November 19, 1916 – July 11, 1990) and Margaret Frost (January 18, 1919 – January 19, 1919)
- Katherine Eugenia Pratt (May 28, 1891 – April 20, 1981) married Burton Parker Twichell, son of Rev. Joseph Twichell. They had four children, David Cushman Twichell (born April 16, 1918), Margaret Frost Twichell (born August 13, 1919), Harmony Twichell (September 9, 1921 – February 20, 1993), and Charles Pratt Twichell (February 27, 1924 – April 3, 2004).
- Richardson Pratt (June 16, 1894 – August 16, 1959) married Laura Cecelia Parsons. They had two children, Mary Marselis Pratt (born September 26, 1920) and Richardson Pratt Jr (March 25, 1923 – May 1, 2001).

Pratt was a member of the Alpha Delta Phi fraternity, and the Nassau Country Club at the time of his death in 1935. He had previously belonged to the New York Yacht Club, The Nineteenth Century Club, the Brooklyn Club, and Hamilton Club, and the Montauk Club.

=== Death and services ===
Pratt died on November 26, 1935, at Seamoor, his estate in Glen Cove, New York. Although had been ailing since late 1922, his cognitive impairment was further exacerbated by the death of brother George Dupont Pratt in January 1935. Charles Pratt was survived by his widow, his sons Richardson and Theodore Pratt, a daughter Katherine Eugenia (Mrs. Burton Parker Twitchell), and three brothers and a sister. Private funeral rites were held at Seamoor under Reverend S. Parkes Cadman of the Central Congregational Church of Brooklyn.

== Legacy and honors ==
In 1903, Pratt was awarded an honorary degree from Yale University.

Upon his death, his estate left $150,000 to educational and religious institutions. His will granted much of his estate to his widow and three children, with funds also to Pratt Institute, Vassar College, Amherst College, Emmanuel Baptist Church of Brooklyn, and the Brooklyn Bureau of Charities. Funds also went to the International Committee of the Young Men's Christian Association, as well as Pomona College, and the Presbyterian Church of Glen Cove, L.I.

A June 1938 report filed with Kings County valued the C. M. Pratt estate at a net value of $20,004,812. Gross estate was $22,181,006. His widow and children were to share in the property, which was primarily in stocks and bonds. A state tax of $3,305,062 was levied against the property, with the Federal tax more.

His widow died on October 24, 1947, at their home of Seamoor in Glen Cove.

=== Estates ===
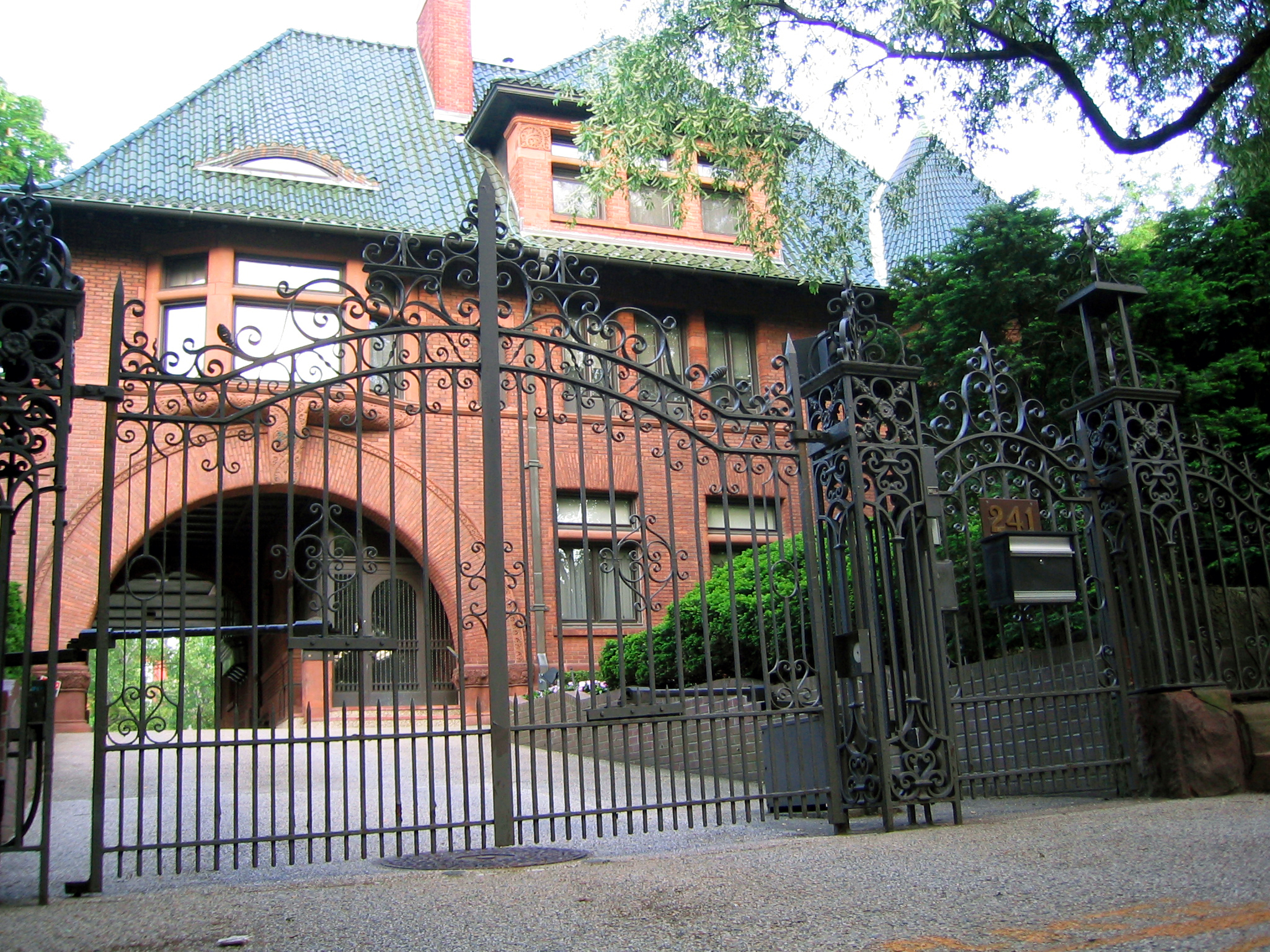
Charles Millard Pratt House, 241 Clinton Ave, Brooklyn

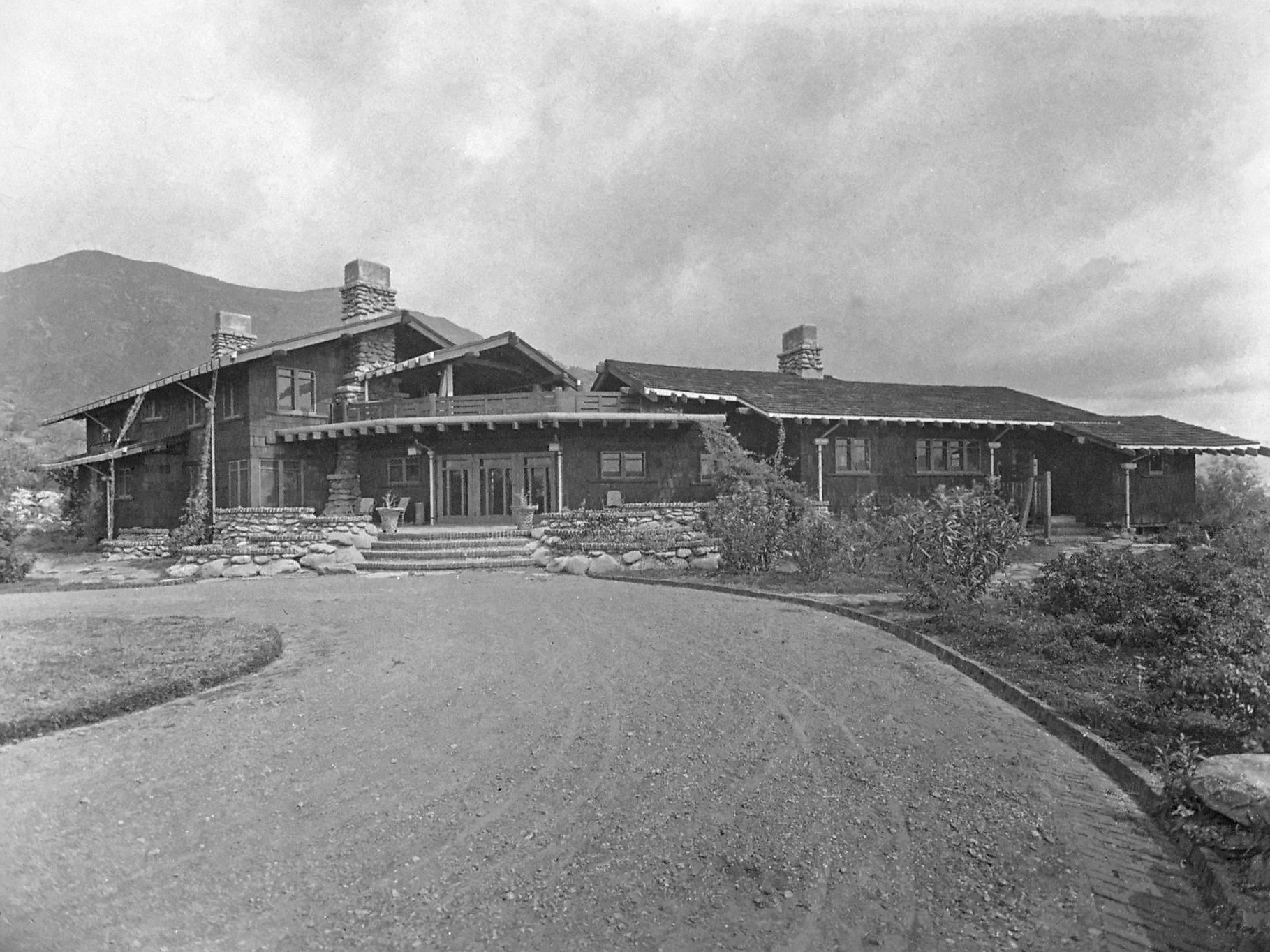
Charles Millard Pratt House, one of only several "ultimate bungalows", in California

Pratt had a number of estates and mansions designed. William Tubby designed the Charles Millard Pratt House at 241 Clinton Avenue, Clinton Hill, Brooklyn in 1893. Located in the Clinton Hill Historic District, it is one of the city's finest examples of Romanesque Revival architecture. The property, owned by the Roman Catholic Diocese of Brooklyn, is now the residence of its prelate, the Bishop of Brooklyn. In 2014 an enormous renovation and restoration effort was undertaken and Brazilian American artist Sergio Rossetti Morosini was commissioned to build new staircases in stone, restore the endangered brownstone architectural artwork, including ornaments, the critically worn façade and its decayed limestone walls.

Pratt had a winter home, also known as the Charles M. Pratt House, which was designed by Greene and Greene in Ojai, California and completed in 1909. The winter bungalow was on a 54-acre estate as of 2001. Architectural Digest described it as an “American masterpiece.”

Beginning circa 1890, he also maintained Seamoor (nominally a summer estate) in Glen Cove, New York. Between 1921 and his death in 1935, Pratt spent "practically all his time" at Seamoor, which encompassed nearly 150 acres at its zenith. The mansion at Seamoor was designed by the New York firm of Lamb & Rich. In 1903, a barn on the property burned down, killing 12 horses. Pratt said the losses were covered by insurance. By October 1930, the property's assessed valuation was around $7 million. The Pratt estate also included the homes of nine members of the family: Representative Ruth Baker Pratt, Harold I. Pratt, Herbert L. Pratt, Charles Pratt, Frederic B. Pratt, George D. Pratt, F. L. Babbett and Helen P. Emmetto.

The large estate was later broken up. In the late 20th century, a portion of the property was donated to the City of Glen Cove for use as a public park. It has been developed for a golf course, tennis courts, a restaurant and related facilities.
