= Poplar Hill (Glen Cove, New York) =

Coordinates: 40.8820°N 73.6364°W

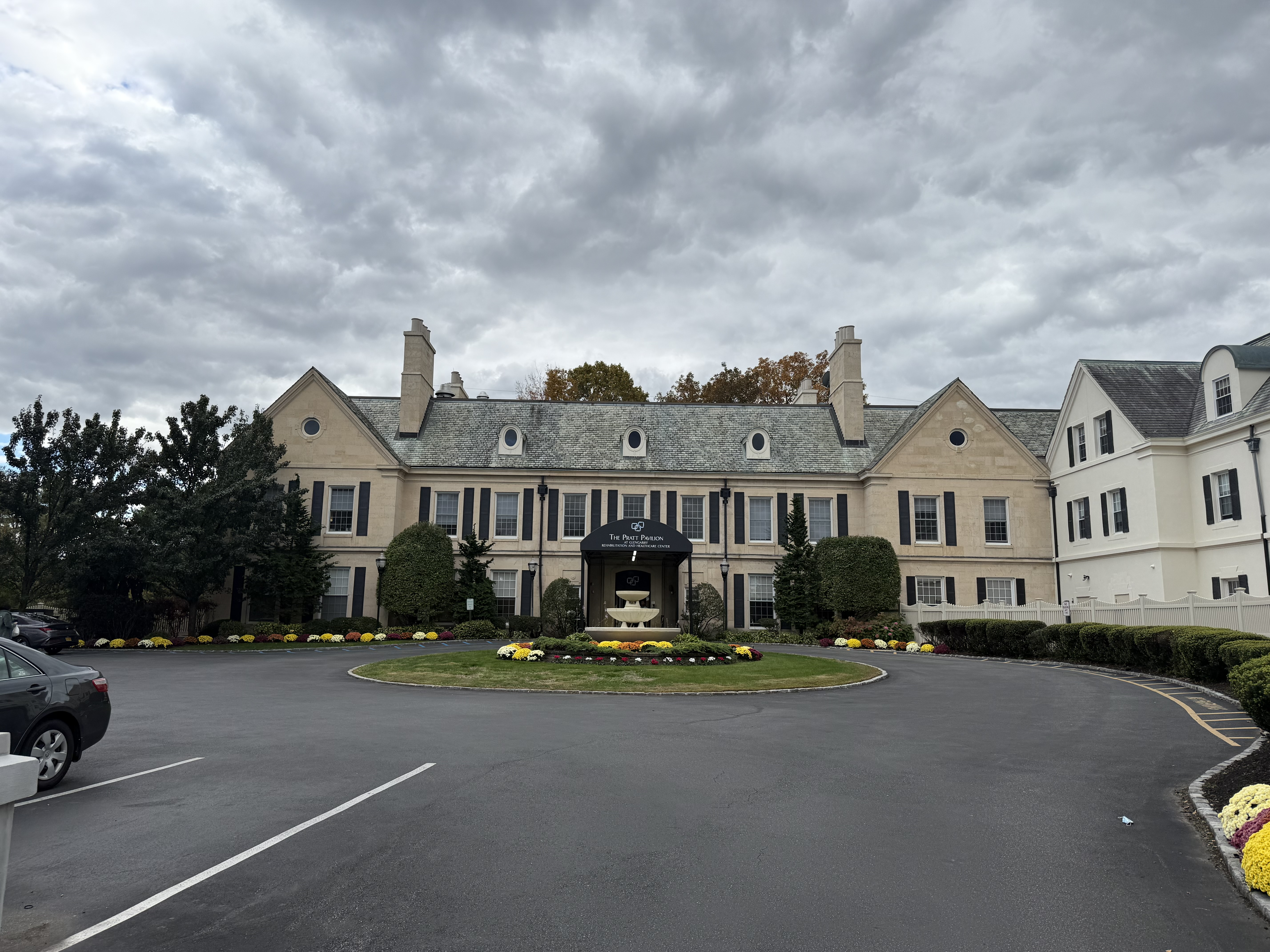
Poplar Hill in use as Glengariff Healthcare Facility in 2026

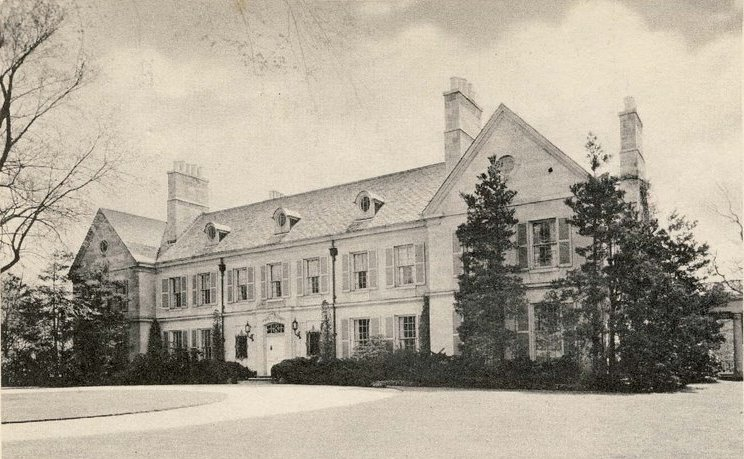
Poplar Hill in the 1940s

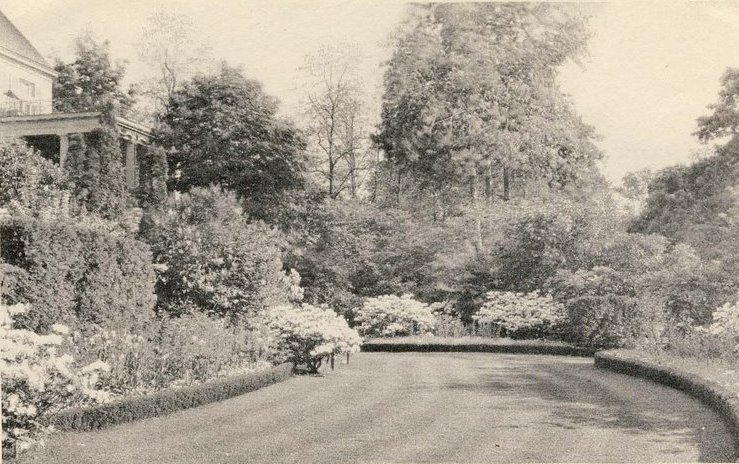
Landscaping in the 1940s

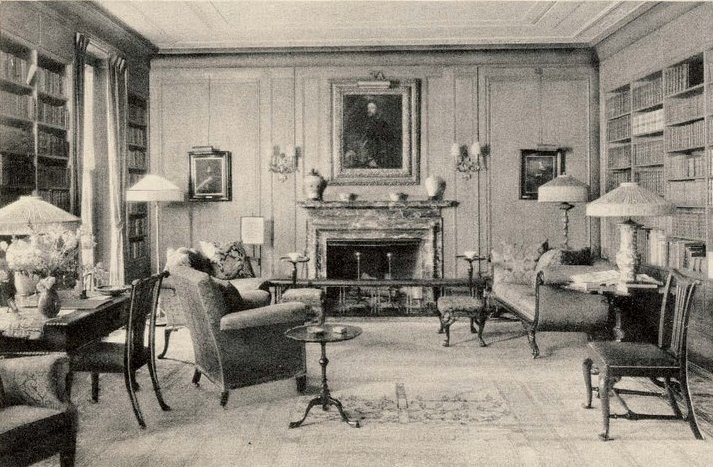
Library in the 1940s

Poplar Hill is a historic mansion in Glen Cove, New York. Constructed for Frederic B. Pratt in 1925, it has been in use as a healthcare center since 1947, and is currently known as the Glengariff Healthcare Center.

== History ==
=== Construction ===
It was constructed in 1925 as the home of Frederic B. Pratt. The home was designed by Charles A. Platt in the French Renaissance style. It had 21 rooms and was on a 35-acre estate. Pratt had the interior designed for comfort rather than to impress because he desired to avoid public attention. The current mansion replaced an earlier mansion designed around 1898. Martha Brookes Brown Hutcheson was the landscape architect for the original estate, which was retained when the building was replaced.

Poplar Hill is one of five existing mansions in Glen Cove built for the sons of oil magnate Charles Pratt. The others are "The Braes", now the Webb Institute of Naval Architecture; "Welwyn", now the Holocaust Memorial and Tolerance Center of Nassau County on the grounds of the Welwyn Preserve; "Killenworth", now the country retreat of the Russian delegation to the United Nations; and "The Manor", now the Glen Cove Mansion Hotel and Conference Center.

=== Healthcare center ===
Frederic Pratt died in 1945. In 1947, the estate was purchased by the Sister Kenny Foundation for use as a hospital for non-infectious poliomyelitis cases. However, the use of the property as a polio treatment center was not approved by the city of Glen Cove. Mary E. Smith of Port Washington, owner of the Bar Beach Nursing Home, purchased the property in late 1947 and converted the building into the Glengariff Nursing Home. It later became known as the Glengariff Healthcare Facility when it changed owners in 1971 and a new nursing home was constructed, and the mansion was abandoned.

The building was renovated as part of a Designers' Showcase event in 1974, after which the building returned to use as a facility for ambulatory patients. During the 1974 showcase, the owner asked the organizers not to use the third floor, but upon entering anyway they found surveillance equipment trained on the neighboring Killenworth estate, which was the country retreat of the Soviet delegation to the United Nations.

As of 2000, Glengariff was a 262-bed subacute care center. The mansion was renovated into a rehabilitation center in 2011.
