= Charles Pratt =

American businessman and philanthropist

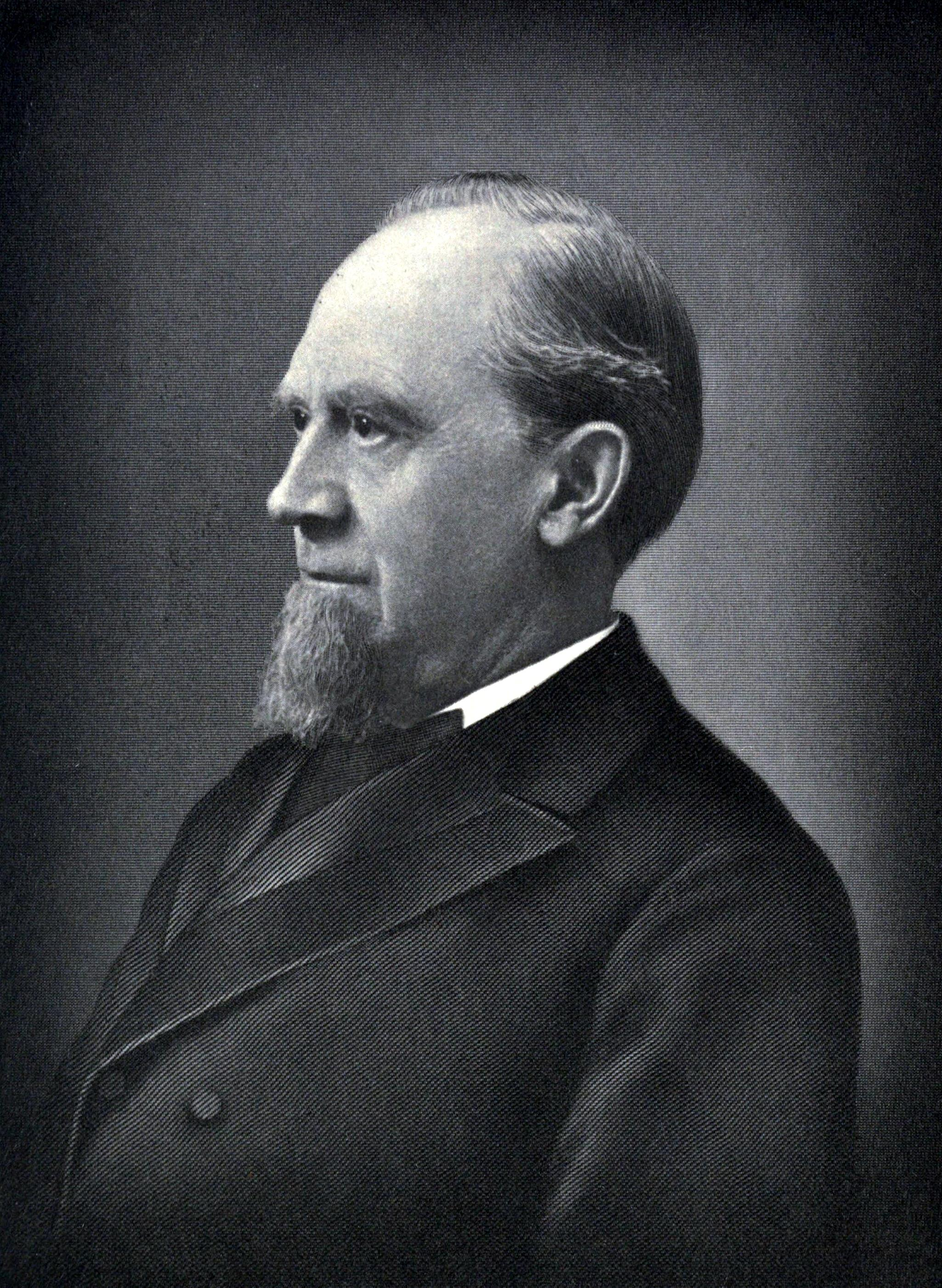
- Born: October 2, 1830; Wilbraham, Massachusetts, US
- Died: May 4, 1891 (aged 60); New York City, US
- Resting place: Pratt Cemetery, Glen Cove, New York, US
- Occupation: Businessman
- Known for: Founded Pratt Institute
- Spouses: Lydia Ann Richardson (m. 1854; died 1861) Mary Helen Richardson (m. 1863)
- Children: Charles Millard Pratt; Lydia Richardson Pratt; Helen Pratt; Frederic B. Pratt; George Dupont Pratt; Herbert L. Pratt; John Teele Pratt; Harold I. Pratt

Charles Pratt (October 2, 1830 – May 4, 1891) was an American businessman. Pratt was a pioneer of the U.S. petroleum industry, and he established his kerosene refinery Astral Oil Works in Brooklyn, New York. He then lived with his growing family in Clinton Hill, Brooklyn. He recruited Henry H. Rogers into his business, forming Charles Pratt and Company in 1867. Seven years later, Pratt and Rogers agreed to join John D. Rockefeller's Standard Oil.

An advocate of education, Pratt founded and endowed the Pratt Institute in Brooklyn, now a renowned art college. He and his children built country estates in Glen Cove, New York, which became known as the Gold Coast in the 1920s on the North Shore of Long Island. In 1916, Standard Oil had a steamship tanker, the first of its class, built at Newport News, Virginia, and it was named in honor of Pratt.

== Early life and education ==
Charles Pratt was born in Wilbraham, Massachusetts, US, as one of eleven children. He was the son of Elizabeth Stone and Asa Pratt, a carpenter. He spent three winters as a student at Wesleyan Academy, Wilbraham (now Wilbraham & Monson Academy).

== Career ==
=== Whale oil, petroleum, Astral Oil ===
As a young man, Pratt joined a company in nearby Boston, Massachusetts, that specialized in paints and whale oil products. In 1850 or 1851, he moved to New York City, where he worked for a similar company. Pratt realized that whale oil could be replaced by petroleum ("natural oil") distillates to light lamps. He became a pioneer of the petroleum industry as new wells were established during the 1860s in western Pennsylvania. In the 1860s, he founded his kerosene refinery, Astral Oil Works, in Brooklyn, New York. One advertising slogan was "The holy lamps of Tibet are primed with Astral Oil."

=== Henry H. Rogers, Charles Pratt and Company ===
Pratt and his future business partner Henry H. Rogers became acquainted while doing business in the oil fields of Pennsylvania. In the mid-1860s, Pratt met two young men, Charles Ellis and Rogers, in the area of the new oil fields of Venango County in western Pennsylvania. Previously, Pratt had bought whale oil from Ellis in Fairhaven, Massachusetts, his and Rogers' coastal hometown. They struck a deal and pre-sold the entire output of their small venture, Wamsutta Oil Refinery, to Pratt's company at a fixed price. But, Ellis and Rogers soon were heavily in debt to Pratt. Ellis gave up, but in 1866, Rogers went to Pratt in New York City to say he would take personal responsibility for the entire debt. Impressed, Pratt immediately hired Rogers for his own organization. After five years in the oil fields, in 1866 Pratt asked Rogers to come to the Brooklyn side of the business, where Rogers worked for the next eight years. Pratt made Rogers foreman of his Brooklyn refinery, with a promise of a partnership if sales ran over $50,000 annually.

In 1867, with Rogers as a partner, Pratt established the firm of Charles Pratt and Company. According to Elbert Hubbard, a journalist, in the next few years Rogers became Pratt's "hands and feet and eyes and ears." In 1867, Pratt built "America's first modern oil refinery (Astral Oil) on the banks of Newtown Creek," In 1869, Pratt trademarked "Pratt's Astral Oil".

=== Standard Oil associations ===
In the early 1870s, Pratt and Rogers became involved in conflicts with John D. Rockefeller's South Improvement Company. Rockefeller had obtained favorable net rates from the Pennsylvania Railroad (PRR) and other railroads through a secret system of rebates. His actions outraged independent oil producers and refineries in western Pennsylvania and other areas. The New York interests formed an association, and about the middle of March 1872, sent a committee of three, with Rogers as head, to Oil City, Pennsylvania to consult with the Oil Producers' Union. Working with the Pennsylvania independents, Rogers and his associates forged an agreement with the PRR and other railroads; the railroads eventually agreed to open rates to all and promised to end their special dealings with South Improvement. The oil men felt victorious, but Rockefeller had already begun to buy up opposing interests in the formation of Standard Oil.

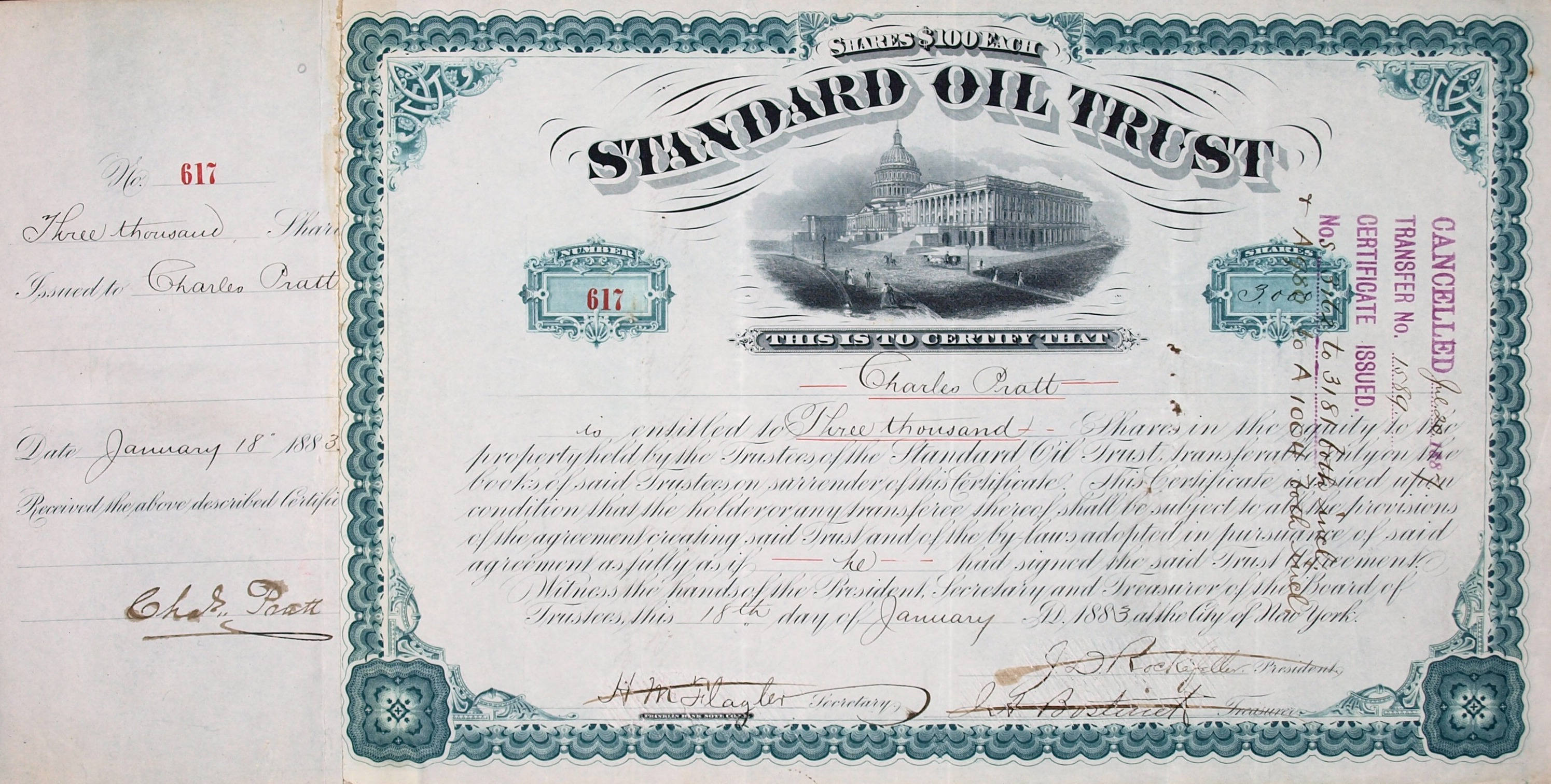
Share of the Standard Oil Trust, issued 18. January 1883, owned by Charles Pratt

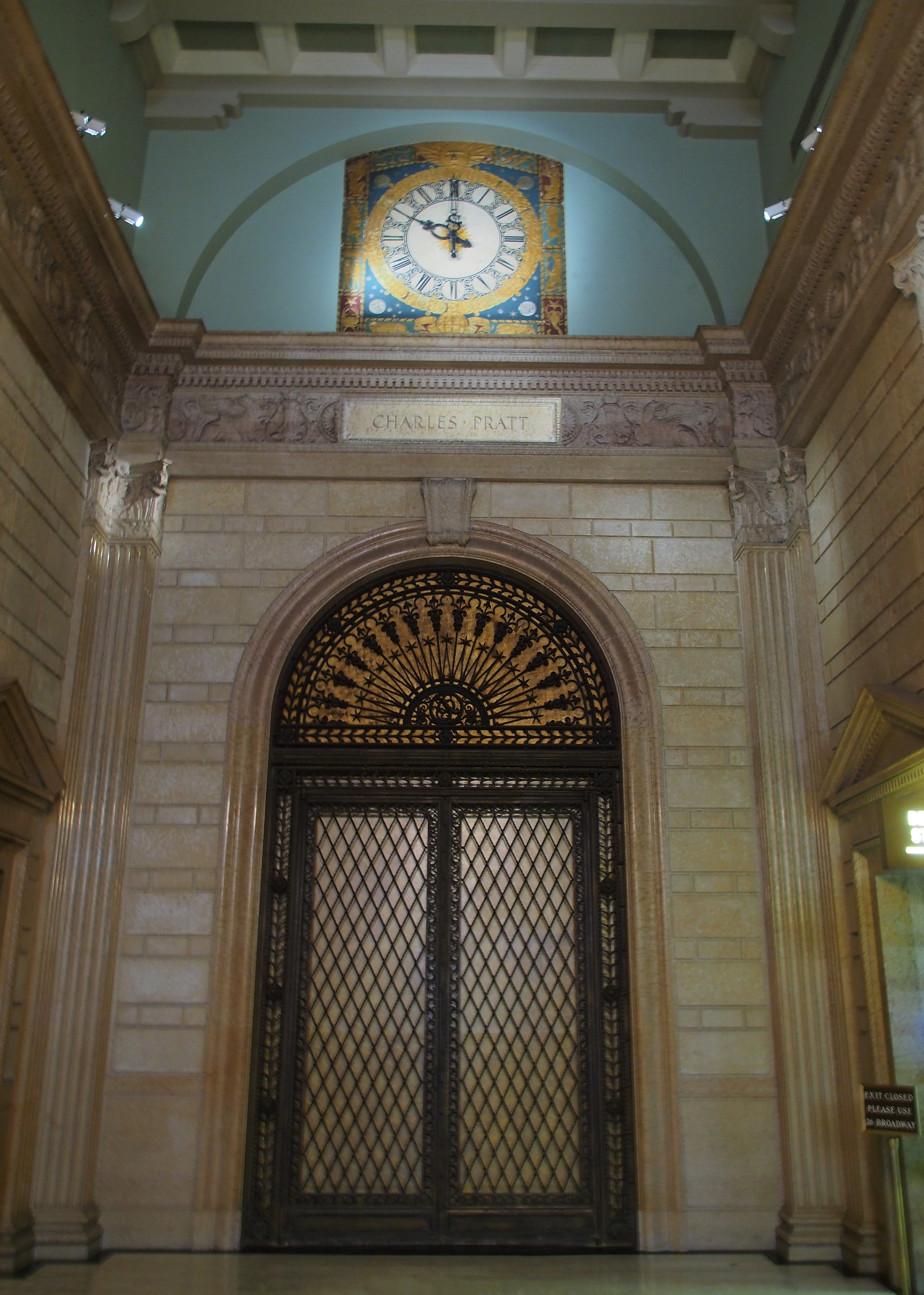
Pratt's name, written in stone in the Standard Oil Building lobby

A short time later, Rockefeller approached Charles Pratt with plans for cooperation and consolidation. Pratt and Rogers decided that the plan would benefit their business plans. Rogers formulated terms which guaranteed financial security and jobs for Pratt and him, which Rockefeller accepted. Charles Pratt and Company (including Astral Oil) became one of the important former independent refiners to join Rockefeller's organization, becoming part of Standard Oil Trust in 1874. However, the fact that Astral Oil was a New York branch of Standard Oil in Ohio was not made public until 1892. When the Rockefellers absorbed the Pratt interests in 1874, Pratt and Rockefeller in 1874 began to buy competing refineries in Brooklyn under the Pratt name. They succeeded in driving a number of smaller firms out of business. Around this time, the coopers' union opposed Pratt's efforts to cut back on certain manual operations, as they were the craftsmen who made the barrels that held the oil. Pratt busted the union, and his strategies for breaking up the organization were adopted by other refineries.

=== Later ventures ===
Astral Oil suffered several fires in the 1870s and 1880s. On January 26, 1873, Pratt's Astral Oil-works in Williamsburg caught fire. At the time, about 250 boys and adult men were employed by Pratt. No deaths were reported with the fire. There was also a December 21, 1884 fire at the Brooklyn Astral refinery. According to Pratt, much of the damages were insured.

Although the merger with Rockefeller made Pratt a wealthy man, as a member of the board of directors of Standard Oil, he maintained his independence and frequently criticized Rockefeller. With Pratt's death in 1891, Rockefeller's position as the most powerful man in the oil industry, already well established, became unassailable. Pratt's family were involved with his business ventures and with Standard Oil. His eldest son, Charles Millard Pratt (1855–1935), became Secretary of Standard Oil. In 1923 his son Herbert Lee Pratt rose to become head of Standard Oil of New York.

== Philanthropy ==
Charles Pratt is credited with recognizing the growing need for trained industrial workers in a changing economy. In 1886, he founded and endowed the Pratt Institute, which opened in Clinton Hill, Brooklyn in 1887. Originally a technical institute, it has become a renowned art, design and architectural college. In 1910, Pratt also endowed the construction of the Pratt School of Naval Architecture and Marine Engineering, at the Massachusetts Institute of Technology. He was an organizing member of the Emmanuel Baptist Church, a prominent and extant congregation near Pratt Institute worshiping in the 1887 edifice supported by Pratt and today known as perhaps the finest extant 19th Century church interior in New York City.

== Personal life ==
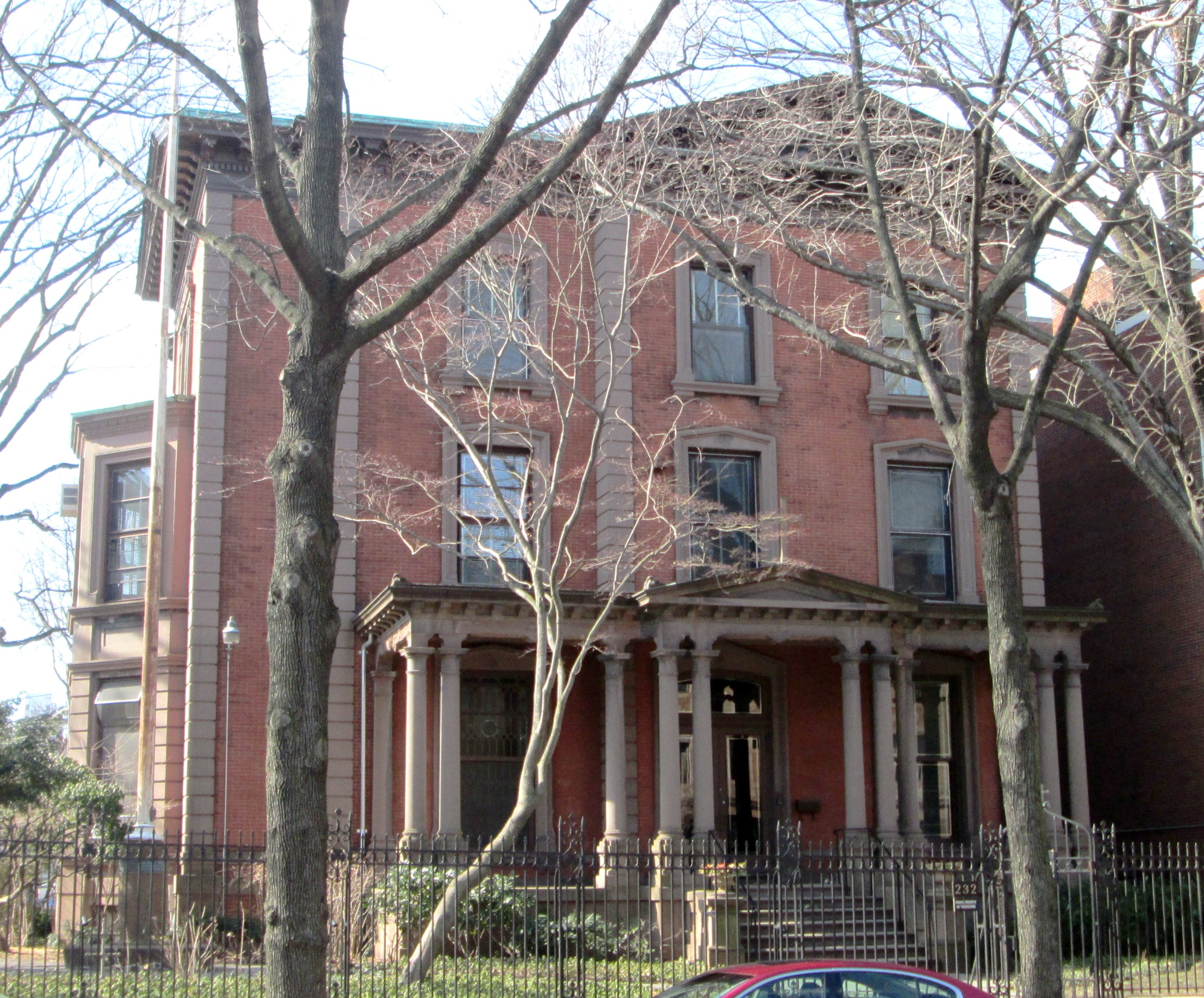
Pratt's city home in Brooklyn, built 1874–1875

Charles Pratt worked first in Boston, then moved to New York in 1850–1851. Soon after getting established in New York, in 1854 he married Lydia Ann Richardson (1835–1861). They had two children: Charles Millard Pratt (1855–1935) and Lydia Richardson Pratt (1857–1904) (who married Frank Lusk Babbott). Lydia died young in 1861. The widower Pratt married her younger sister Mary Helen Richardson in September 1863. They had six children together: Frederic B. Pratt (1865–1945), Helen Pratt (1867–1949), George Dupont Pratt (1869–1935), Herbert L. Pratt (1871–1945), John Teele Pratt (1873–1927), and Harold I. Pratt (1877–1939). Pratt moved to a country home in Glen Cove, New York, about 1890. To provide for his children, he purchased large tracts of land surrounding his estate, totaling 1,100 acres (4.5 km^{2}). He died the next year, aged 60, in New York City. Each of the sons developed an individual estate in Glen Cove. Other notable Pratt descendants include:

- Andy Pratt (born 1947 in Boston), a great-grandson who is a singer-songwriter. His father Edwin H Baker Pratt was headmaster of the school Buckingham Browne & Nichols.
- Sherman Pratt (1900–1964), grandson of Charles Pratt and son of George Dupont Pratt. Founder of Marineland of Florida
- Richardson J. Pratt 'Jerry' (1923–2001), great-grandson of Charles Pratt and grandson of Charles Millard Pratt. Was President of Pratt Institute (1972–1990)
- Suzanna Love (1950–), great-granddaughter of Charles Pratt and granddaughter of John Teele Pratt. Former actress.
- John Sherman Register (1939-1996), realist painter.

== Legacy and honors ==
=== Long Island mansions ===
After his death, Charles Pratt's six sons and two daughters later built their own family estates in Glen Cove. As of 2004, most of the extant Pratt family Gold Coast Mansions are still in use:

- Welwyn, originally the estate of Harold I. Pratt, is owned by and operated as the Welwyn Preserve, a Nassau County park; the house is now adapted as the Holocaust Memorial and Tolerance Center of Nassau County.
- The Braes, initially owned by Herbert L. Pratt, is now used as the Webb Institute of Naval Architecture and Marine Engineering.
- The Manor, built for John Teele Pratt, is now the Glen Cove Mansion Hotel & Conference Center.
- Poplar Hill, the Frederic B. Pratt residence, is now the Glengariff Healthcare Center, housing both Glengariff (a long-term nursing care facility) and the Pratt Pavilion for Nursing and Rehabilitation (a state-of-the-art, short-term, sub-acute rehabilitation center).
- Killenworth, originally the home of George Dupont Pratt, has been (since the mid-20th century) the country retreat for the Russian delegation to the United Nations.

=== Pratt Cemetery ===
With so many Pratt family members in Glen Cove, they had a cemetery built for themselves on their property. Known as "Pratt Cemetery", behind ornate gates and up a winding drive stands a pink granite Romanesque mausoleum designed by William Tubby, as well as a crypt and a tower connected by a "bridge of sighs". Charles Pratt is interred in a sarcophagus here, as are seven out of his eight children, and many of his grandchildren.

=== Pratt, West Virginia ===
The town of Pratt, West Virginia (previously known as Clinton) was renamed Pratt in 1905, after the owner of the Charles Pratt Coal Company.

=== Steamship tanker S.S. Charles Pratt ===
In March 1916, Newport News Shipbuilding and Dry Dock Company launched the S.S. Charles Pratt, a tanker of 8,807 tons with a capacity of 119,410 barrels (18,985 m^{3}) of oil. It became the first ship of the Pratt class, and was joined by the S.S. H.H. Rogers in May 1916.

After 1939, both ships were operated by Panama Transport Co., a subsidiary of Standard Oil of New Jersey. At the beginning of World War II, on December 21, 1940, the S.S. Charles Pratt was torpedoed and sunk by a German U-boat in the Atlantic Ocean 220 miles (350 km) off the coast of Africa while en route from Aruba to Freetown, Sierra Leone. Of the American crew of 42, only two men died.

== See also ==
- Pratt Institute
- Ida M. Tarbell

== Sources ==
- Hubbard, Elbert (1909). Little Journeys to the Homes of the Great, Vol. 11, Great Businessmen. University of Pennsylvania.
- Tarbell, Ida M. 1904, The History of Standard Oil
- "History of Glen Cove", Glen Cove, Long Island website
- "Pratt Institute", Council for Advancement and Support of Education (CASE) website
- "History", Pratt Institute Official Website
