= William W. Cohen =

American businessman and politician (1874–1940)

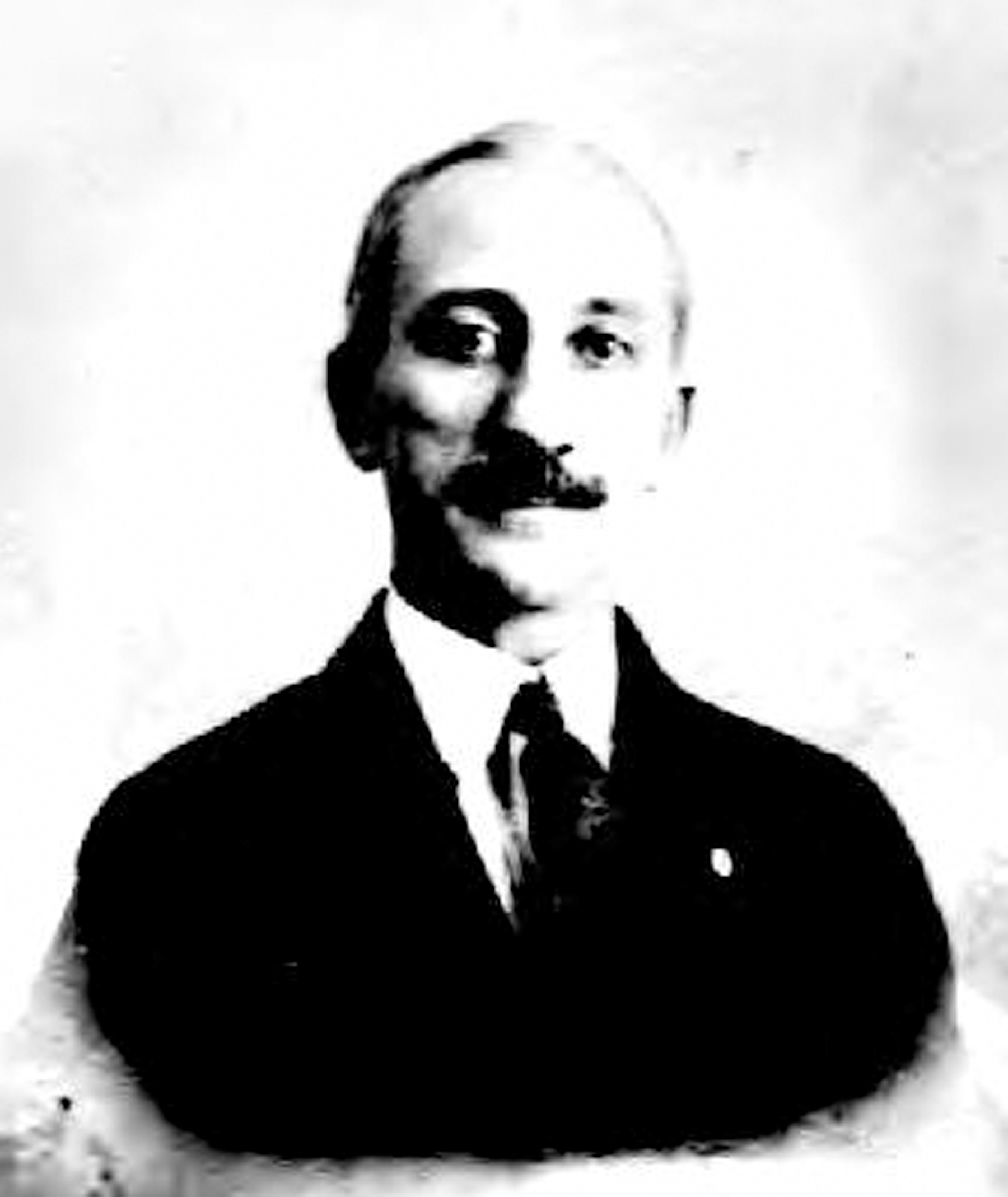

Member of the U.S. House of Representatives from New York's 17th district
- In office March 4, 1927 – March 3, 1929
- Preceded by: Ogden L. Mills
- Succeeded by: Ruth Baker Pratt

Personal details
- Born: September 6, 1874 Brooklyn, New York, U.S.
- Died: October 12, 1940 (aged 66) New York City, U.S.
- Party: Democratic
- Spouse: Sophie Dazian (m. 1902)

William Wolfe Cohen (September 6, 1874 – October 12, 1940) was an American businessman and politician who served as a member of the U.S. House of Representatives from New York's 17th congressional district from 1927 to 1929.

Born in Brooklyn, New York, to Russian-born Bernard Cohen and German-born Frederica (née Cronocher), Cohen attended public schools. He associated with his father in the shoe manufacturing business until 1903, when he engaged in banking and brokerage. Cohen was a member of the New York Stock Exchange and director of the New York Cotton Exchange. He served as vice chairman of the Public Schools Athletic League, and was an honorary deputy chief of the New York City Fire Department.

Cohen was elected as a Democrat to the 70th United States Congress. He served for a single term from March 4, 1927, to March 3, 1929, and was not a candidate for re-nomination for a second term in 1928. He resumed his former business pursuits in New York City and strongly supported a boycott against Nazi Germany in the 1930s, declaring that "any Jew buying one penny's worth of merchandise made in Germany is a traitor to his people." He died on October 12, 1940. In keeping with his Jewish faith, Cohen was interred in Mount Neboh Cemetery in Brooklyn.

== Electoral history ==
Electoral history of William W. Cohen
Year	Office		Party	Votes			Result	Swing	Ref.
Year	Office		Party	Total	%	P.	Result	Swing	Ref.
1926	U.S. House	17th	Democratic	22,401	50.36	1st	Won	Gain	
Source: Clerk of the U.S. House | Election Statistics

== See also ==
- List of Jewish members of the United States Congress

U.S. House of Representatives
Preceded by Ogden L. Mills	Member of the U.S. House of Representatives from New York's 17th congressional district 1927–1929	Succeeded by Ruth Baker Pratt
