= Theodore A. Peyser =

American politician (1873–1937)

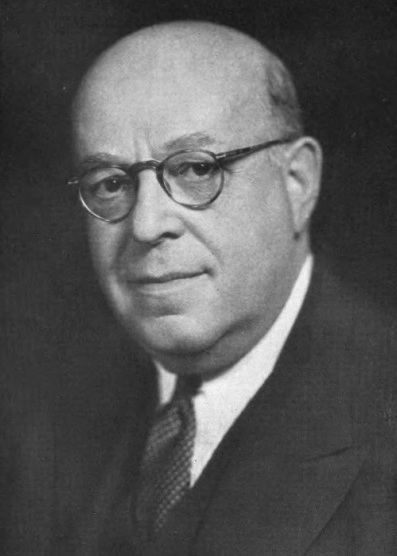

Member of the U.S. House of Representatives from New York's 17th district
- In office March 4, 1933 – August 8, 1937
- Preceded by: Ruth Baker Pratt
- Succeeded by: Bruce Fairchild Barton

Personal details
- Born: February 18, 1873 Charleston, West Virginia, U.S.
- Died: August 8, 1937 (aged 64) New York City, New York, U.S.
- Party: Democratic

Theodore Albert Peyser (February 18, 1873 – August 8, 1937) was an American businessman and politician who served three terms as a Democratic member of the United States House of Representatives from New York from 1932 to 1937.

== Biography ==
Peyser was born in Charleston, West Virginia on February 18, 1873. Peyser attended Charleston public schools until he was 11 years old and then had to leave school and turn to working to support his family.

He moved to Cincinnati, Ohio in 1893 and worked as a traveling salesman until 1900 when he moved to New York City and entered the life insurance business. Peyser was a very successful life insurance salesman he is credited with having sold million dollar life insurance policies to thirty three clients.

=== Congress ===
He was elected to Congress in 1932 defeating incumbent Ruth Pratt and represented New York's 17th congressional district from March 4, 1933, until his death in New York City on August 8, 1937.

During his time in Congress, he was a vehement opponent of prohibition; he offered a plan to "Tax the thirsty and feed the hungry" as a solution to the problem of alcohol. He also helped allocate funds for an airport on Governor's Island. While Rep. Peyser agreed with President Roosevelt on most legislation including the New Deal he disagreed with the president's belief of Supreme Court expansion.

== See also ==
- List of Jewish members of the United States Congress
- List of members of the United States Congress who died in office (1900–1949)
- List of people from West Virginia

== Sources ==
- United States Congress. "Theodore A. Peyser (id: P000281)". Biographical Directory of the United States Congress.
- https://timesmachine.nytimes.com/timesmachine/1937/08/09/97545951.html?pageNumber=19

U.S. House of Representatives
Preceded by Ruth Baker Pratt	Member of the U.S. House of Representatives from New York's 17th congressional district 1933–1937	Succeeded by Bruce Fairchild Barton
