= Herbert L. Pratt =

American businessman

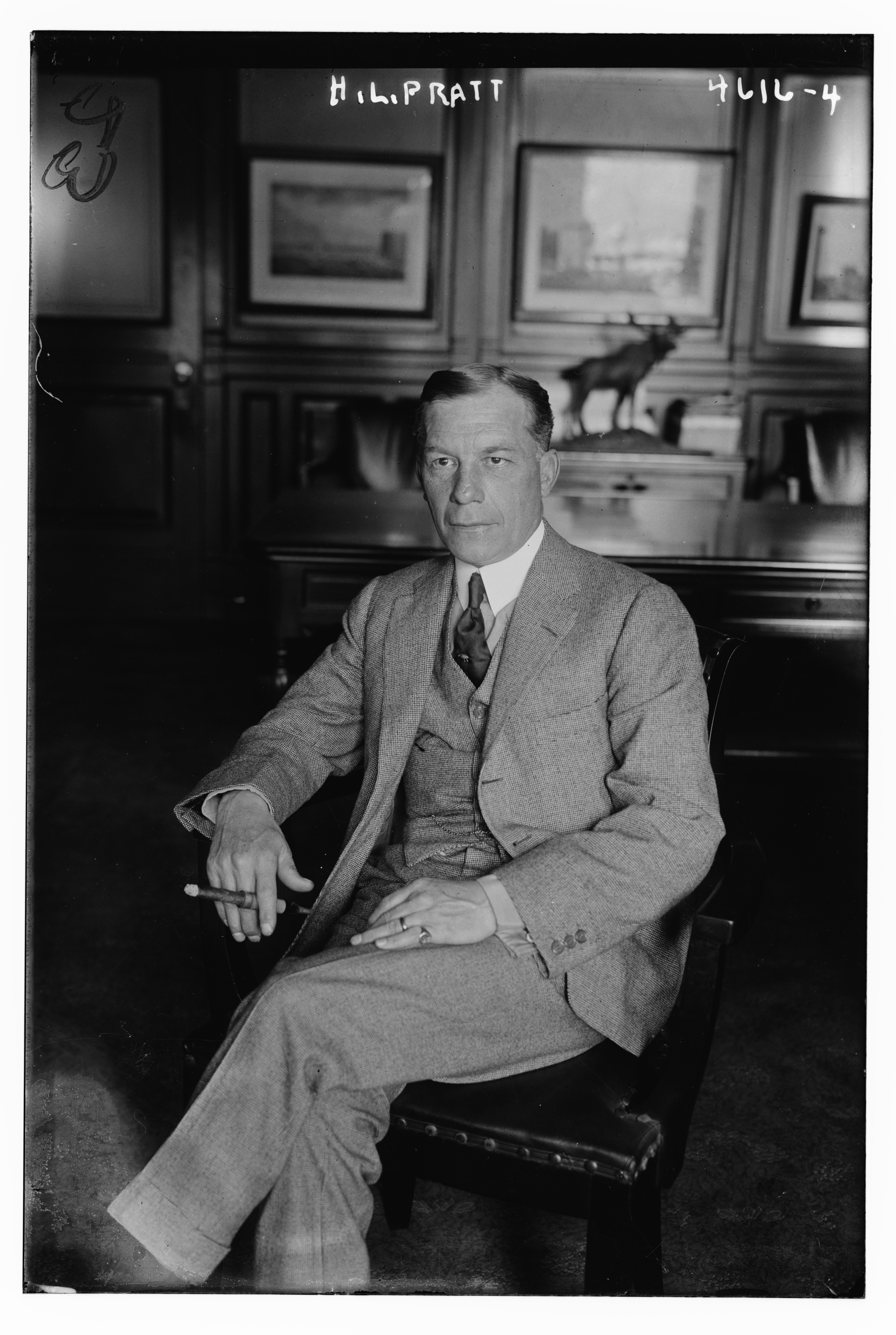
- Pratt in 1918

President of Standard Oil Company of New York
- In office 1923–1928
- Preceded by: Henry Clay Folger
- Succeeded by: Charles F. Meyer

Personal details
- Born: Herbert Lee Pratt; November 21, 1871 New York City, US
- Died: February 3, 1945 (aged 73) New York City, US
- Spouse: Florence Balsdon Gibb (m. 1897; died 1935)
- Relations: Frederic B. Pratt (brother); George Dupont Pratt (brother); John Teele Pratt (brother); Harold I. Pratt (brother); Charles M. Pratt (half-brother)
- Parent(s): Mary Helen Richardson; Charles Pratt
- Education: Amherst College
- Occupation: Businessman

Herbert Lee Pratt (November 21, 1871 – February 3, 1945) was an American businessman and a leading figure in the United States oil industry. In 1923, he became head of Standard Oil of New York; his father Charles Pratt was a founder of Astral Oil Works, which later became part of Standard Oil. He lived and worked in New York City, as well as having a country estate, The Braes in Glen Cove, Long Island, and a hunting preserve and estate, "Good Hope Plantation" in Ridgeland, South Carolina. He was also an art collector and philanthropist.

== Early life ==
Pratt was born in Brooklyn, New York, on November 21, 1871. He was the fourth of six children of the Standard Oil industrialist Charles Pratt, and Mary Helen (née Richardson) Pratt, his father's second wife. His siblings included Frederic B. Pratt, George Dupont Pratt, Helen Pratt, John Teele Pratt (husband of Ruth Baker Pratt, the first woman elected to the U.S. House of Representatives from New York) and Harold I. Pratt. From his father's first marriage to Lydia Richardson (the elder sister of his mother), who died young in 1861, his older half-siblings were Charles Millard Pratt and Lydia Richardson Pratt.

He took a degree of Bachelor of Arts at Amherst College in 1895, a classmate of future president Calvin Coolidge.

== Career ==
After his graduation from Amherst, he became a clerk at Bergen Point Chemical Works. He later became assistant to the manager of the Pratt Works and factories in Brooklyn and the manager of the Kings County and Long Island Works.

Like his father, who was a pioneer in the independent oil industry and accepted a merger with Standard Oil, Pratt was a leading figure in the U.S. oil industry. On June 1, 1923, he was elected to replace Henry Clay Folger as head of Standard Oil Company of New York, also known as Socony (which eventually became known as Mobil). After the announcement, he was featured on the June 11, 1923, cover of Time. In 1928, after Charles F. Meyer became president of Standard Oil of New York, Pratt became chairman of the board.

In 1931, when Socony merged with the Vacuum Oil Company, Pratt was elected chairman of the board of the new Socony-Vacuum Corporation, which had capital of $1,000,000,000. Pratt retired as chairman on June 1, 1935, after forty years of service. He was also a director of Bankers Trust Company from 1917 to 1938, Asia Banking Corporation, the American Can Company, Stone & Webster and the Charles Pratt and Company.

== Personal life ==
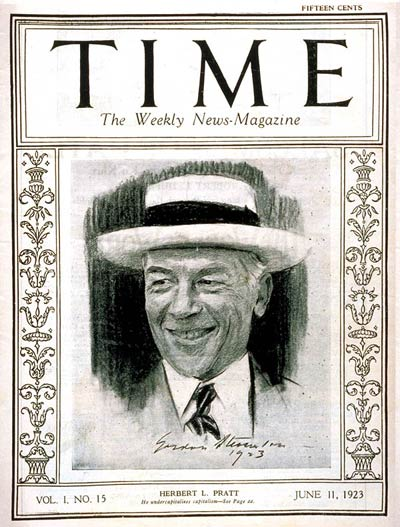
Pratt on the cover of Time magazine

On April 28, 1897, Pratt married Florence Balsdon Gibb (1873–1935). Florence, a graduate of Packer Collegiate Institute, a daughter of Harriet (née Balsdon) Gibb and John Gibb, a leading merchant who was the head of Loeser & Co. In 1927, Florence was the first woman elected to the State Board of Regents. Together, Herbert and Florence were the parents of five children:

- Edith Gibb Pratt (1898–1956), who married Allan McLane Jr., a son of Judge Allan McLane, in 1919. They divorced in 1934 and she married Howard W. Maxwell Jr., a grandson of John Rogers Maxwell Sr., in 1946.
- Herbert Lee Pratt Jr. (1900–1974), who married Hope Gordon Winchester, daughter of Lycurgus Winchester of Baltimore, in 1926.
- Harriet Balsdon Pratt (1901–1978), who married Lawrence Bell Van Ingen, son of Edward Hook Van Ingen Jr., in 1923. They divorced in 1938, and later that same year she married Donald Fairfax Bush.
- Florence Gibb Pratt (1905–1965), who married Francis Edward Powell Jr., son of Francis Edward Powell who represented the Standard Oil Company in Germany and later in England.
- Frederic Richardson Pratt (1907–1966), who married Pauline Dixon Dodge; after his death, she married landscape architect Richard K. Webel in 1969.

On January 2, 1935, his wife died at their New York residence, 1027 Fifth Avenue. Pratt died on February 3, 1945, at the age of 73 at 834 Fifth Avenue, his home in Manhattan, New York City. After a funeral at St. James' Episcopal Church on Madison Avenue and 71st Street, he was buried in Pratt Cemetery, the family cemetery in Lattingtown, New York.

=== Residences ===
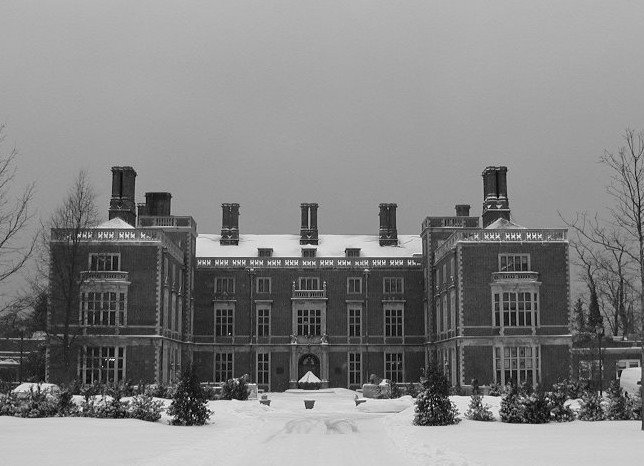
"The Braes", now Stevenson Taylor Hall, Webb Institute, Glen Cove, New York (c. 2001)

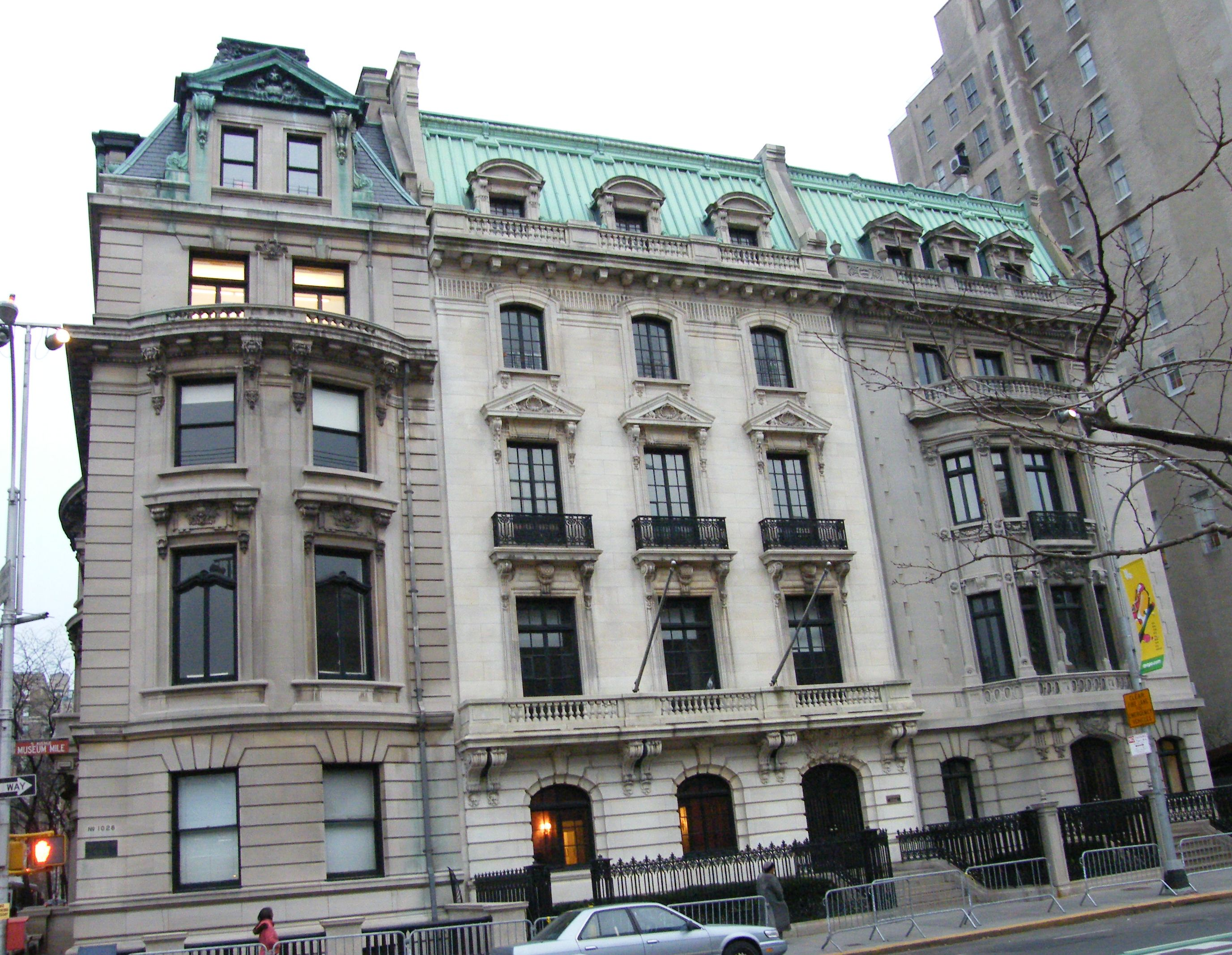
1027 Fifth Avenue (center).

Pratt was a native of the Clinton Hill neighborhood of Brooklyn. His mansion at 213 Clinton Avenue was constructed in 1908, but, in 1914, the Pratt's moved to 640 Park Avenue in Manhattan, a luxury building designed by J. E. R. Carpenter. In 1916, the 12-story 907 Fifth Avenue building, also designed by Carpenter, was completed, and Pratt, then vice president of Standard Oil, rented the largest apartment, 25 rooms and eight baths, occupying the entire top floor, at an annual rent of $30,000. It was the first building developed to replace one of the mansions previously fronting on Central Park.

Pratt soon outgrew this residence and moved again to the 1027 Fifth Avenue, a 40 ft. wide residence that was the central of three Beaux-Arts mansions at 84th and Fifth Avenue. Their neighbors included Florence Adele Vanderbilt Twombly at 1028 Fifth Avenue. In 1936, a year after his wife's death, he sold 1027 Fifth Avenue to the Marymount School, who had owned Mrs. Twombly's home since 1926, and combined the building with its neighbors but preserved all the exteriors and much of the interiors.

His country estate, "The Braes", in Glen Cove, Long Island, was built in 1912–14 and designed by James Brite in the neo-Jacobean style. It was the largest of the six Pratt family mansions at Glen Cove. It is now part of the Webb Institute. Pratt also built "Homewood" for his daughter Edith and "Preference" in Lattingtown for his daughter Harriet, both designed by Carrère and Hastings.

In 1910, Pratt bought the 9,000-acre (36 km^{2}) Good Hope plantation and hunting lodge in South Carolina (about five miles (8 km) from Ridgeland) from Harry B. Hollins, also of Long Island. For several years, the Pratt family leased Yester, an old castle on the Moors in East Lothian, Scotland for the shooting season.

Pratt also spent summer months at his Japanese themed "camp," Pine Tree Point, on Upper St. Regis Lake in the Adirondacks, which he purchased from Frederick William Vanderbilt in the early 1900s. He also spend some time at the Caughnawana Fishing and Hunting Club in Quebec, Canada.

=== Philanthropy ===
Pratt was an art collector, particularly of portraits and miniatures. In 1937, he was elected a trustee of the Metropolitan Museum of Art. When Rotherwas Court, Herefordshire, England, was dismantled and auctioned in 1913, Pratt purchased the dining room for his neo-Jacobean mansion "The Braes," then under construction as a country estate in Glen Cove. His bequest to Amherst College included the Rotherwas Room and more than 80 American portraits and miniatures, as well as an extensive collection of decorative arts. The Rotherwas Room was incorporated into the Mead Art Museum, when it was built at Amherst College in 1949.

The Webb Institute of Naval Architecture acquired "The Braes" in 1945 for use as its campus. After renovation, it held its first classes there in 1947. Additions have included a library, model facility and other features.

=== Legacy ===
A Steamship was named after Herbert L Pratt. On June 3, 1918, the Herbert L Pratt struck a mine off Delaware laid by SM U-151 (Imperial German Navy). The Pratt was saved, salvaged and towed to port.

Awards and achievements
Preceded by John L. Lewis	Cover of Time magazine June 11, 1923	Succeeded by Edward M. House
