= Edwin H. Baker Pratt =

- Born: Edwin Howard Baker Pratt; June 5, 1913; Glen Cove, New York, US
- Died: March 18, 1975 (aged 61); Boston, Massachusetts, US
- Education: Harvard College
- Occupation: Educator
- Employer(s): Westminster School; Browne & Nichols School
- Spouse: Aileen Kelly (m. 1936)
- Children: 4; including Andy
- Parents: John Teele Pratt (father); Ruth Baker Pratt (mother)
- Relatives: Charles Pratt (grandfather)

Edwin Howard Baker Pratt (June 5, 1913 – March 18, 1975), was an American educator and headmaster of Buckingham Browne & Nichols.

== Early life ==
On June 5, 1913, Pratt was born in Glen Cove, New York. Pratt's father was John Teele Pratt, a lawyer and financier. Pratt's mother Ruth Baker Pratt, a Republican Congresswoman. Pratt's grandfather was Charles Pratt, an oil industry pioneer. Pratt had four siblings and was named after his maternal uncle, Edwin Howard Baker, the head of Organo Chemical Company of Cambridge.

In 1936, Pratt graduated from Harvard College.

== Career ==
From 1949 to 1968, Pratt served as the headmaster of the private Browne & Nichols, now Buckingham Browne & Nichols, in Cambridge, Massachusetts. He was previously a teacher at the Westminster School.

== Personal life ==
In 1935, Pratt became engaged to Aileen Kelly of Massachusetts, who had been born in Monte Carlo in 1915. They married in 1936 at St. Stephen's Episcopal Church in Pittsfield, and together had four children, the youngest of whom is singer-songwriter Andy Pratt.

Pratt, a resident of Marion, Massachusetts, died on March 18, 1975, at Peter Bent Brigham Hospital in Boston, Massachusetts, aged 61. His widow died the following year in 1976.

=== Legacy ===
Through bequests to Buckingham Browne & Nichols, there are the Edwin H. B. Pratt Faculty Fund and the Edwin and Aileen Pratt Faculty Development Fund.
