= John Rogers Maxwell Sr. =

- Born: John Rogers Maxwell; November 20, 1846
- Died: December 10, 1910 (aged 64); New York City, U.S.
- Spouse: Maria Louise Washburn

John Rogers Maxwell Sr. (November 20, 1846 – December 10, 1910) was Chairman of the Executive Committee of the Central Railroad of New Jersey, for many years President of the Atlas Portland Cement Company.

== Biography ==
He was born in 1846. He died on December 10, 1910, at his home at 78 Eighth Avenue in Brooklyn, of cerebral apoplexy.
