= George Dupont Pratt =

American environmentalist (1869–1935)

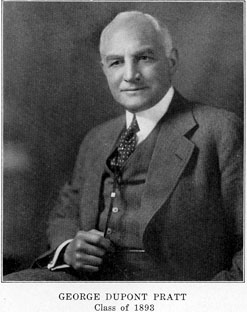
- George Dupont Pratt
- Born: August 16, 1869; Clinton Hill, Brooklyn, New York, US
- Died: January 20, 1935 (aged 66); Glen Cove, Long Island, New York, US
- Education: Amherst College
- Occupations: Conservationist, philanthropist, Boy Scout sponsor, big-game hunter and collector of ancient antiquities
- Spouses: Helen Deming Sherman Pratt; Vera Hale
- Children: 5, including Sherman Pratt
- Parent(s): Charles Pratt; Mary Helen Richardson
- Relatives: Frederic B. Pratt, Herbert L. Pratt, John Teele Pratt and Harold I. Pratt (brothers); Charles Millard Pratt (half-brother)

George Dupont Pratt (August 16, 1869 – January 20, 1935) was an American conservationist, philanthropist, Boy Scout sponsor, big-game hunter and collector of ancient antiquities.

== Early life ==
Pratt was born on August 16, 1869, and raised in Clinton Hill, Brooklyn, New York, the third son of Standard Oil magnate Charles Pratt and his wife Mary Helen Richardson.

He was brother to Frederic B. Pratt, Herbert L. Pratt, John Teele Pratt and Harold I. Pratt; and half-brother to Charles Millard Pratt.

He graduated from Amherst College in 1893, and "excelled as an athlete".

Pratt was a member of the track team, one of Amherst's great teams, who easily won the NEIAA Championship at Worcester, May 28, 1890. In the NEIAA Championship of 1892, he set a new record in the two mile bicycle race.

Pratt was also quarterback for the football team. The 1892 team, which he captained, is considered “the greatest football team of which Amherst can boast”. They played thirteen games, all with other college teams, won 8 and lost 5, scored 314 to opponents 141. On November 18, 1892, Amherst beat Williams on Weston Field at Williamstown, 60-0. Pratt kicked ten goals from almost every angle of the field, most of them against the wind. This record still stands today as the best goal-kicking exhibition of any Amherst player in a major game.

== Career ==
In 1895, Pratt started work for the Long Island Rail Road, and in 1900, was assistant to the president and superintendent of ferries.

In 1910, he helped organize the Boy Scouts of America and served as treasurer.

As an early member of the Camp-Fire Club he became interested in conservation and for 25 years served on its committee on conservation. He was Conservation Commissioner of New York from 1915 to 1921.

Pratt was a trustee of Amherst College, the American Museum of Natural History, the Metropolitan Museum, vice president of the Pratt Institute, and president of the American Forestry Association. He was also a major donor to the Metropolitan's Decorative Arts Department.

== Heritage ==
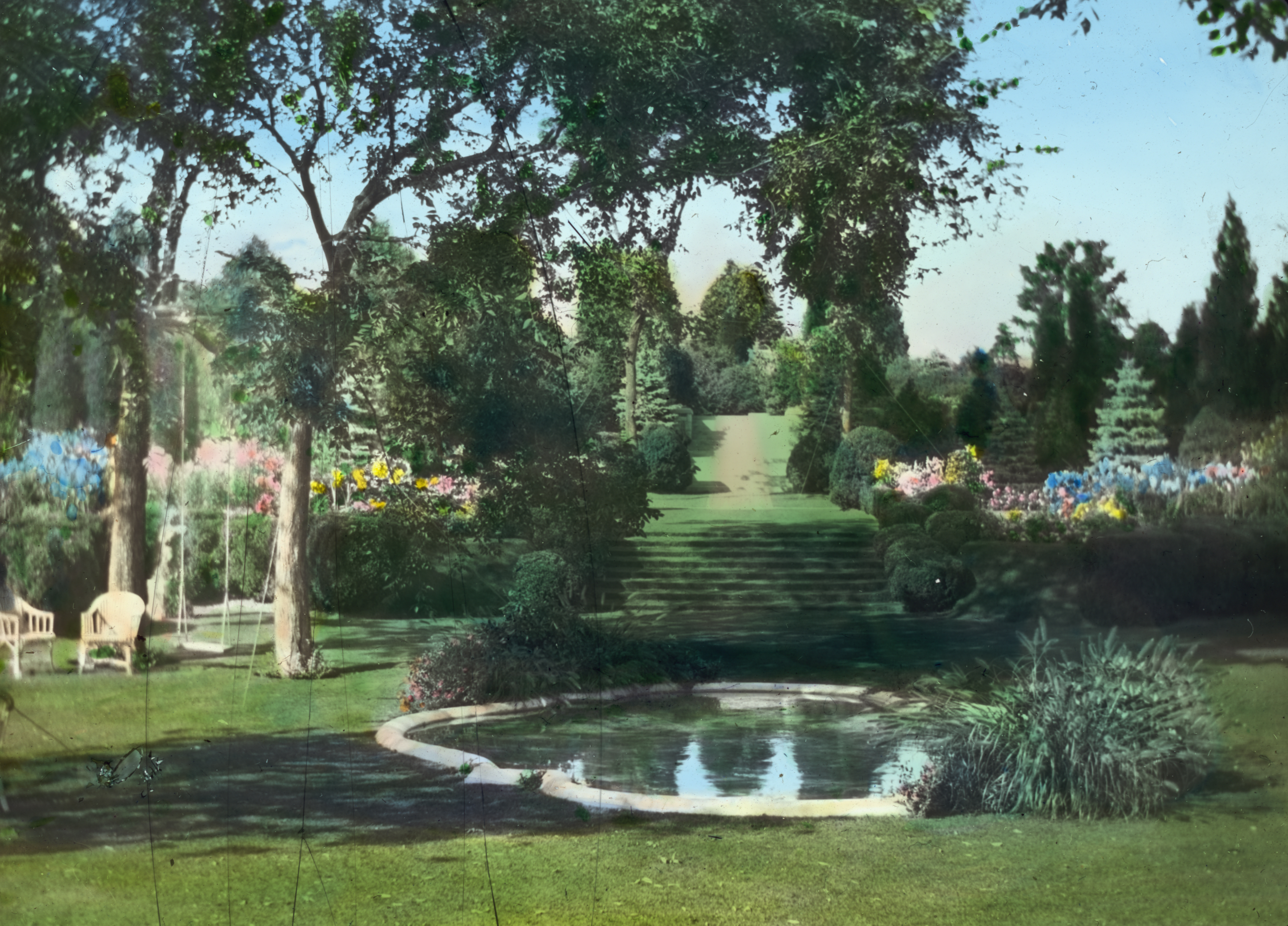
Gardens at Killenworth, considered James Leal Greenleaf's greatest accomplishment

His house "Killenworth" at Glen Cove was one of the larger Pratt family mansions, built in 1913 in a Tudor style, with 39 panelled rooms, thirteen bathrooms, twelve fireplaces, five cellars, a swimming pool, and flower beds tended by 50 gardeners. It was designed by Trowbridge and Ackerman. By the 1950s it was purchased by the then Soviet Union to serve as the retreat for the Soviet delegation to the United Nations.

== Personal life ==
In 1897, Pratt married Helen Deming Sherman Pratt (1869-1923), the daughter of John Taylor Sherman, a Brooklyn cotton merchant, and great granddaughter of American founding father Roger Sherman; her sister Gertrude Mary (Sherman) Trowbridge was the grandmother of US Secretary of Commerce Alexander Buel Trowbridge, who was also an executive in the Rockefeller/Pratt oil business.

They had five children, including the explorer Sherman Pratt and Eliot Deming Pratt, chairman of trustees of Goddard College, Vermont for 15 years, where the Eliot Pratt Center and the Eliot D Pratt Library are named in his honor.

In 1926, Pratt married Vera Hale, daughter of William Amherst Hale, a banker of Sherbrooke, Quebec, Canada. They did not have any children. She died on February 3, 1978.

Pratt died at home in Glen Cove on January 20, 1935.
