= Sherman Pratt =

American co-founder of Florida's Marineland

- Born: March 22, 1900; Brooklyn, New York, U.S.
- Died: September 14, 1964 (aged 64); London, England
- Education: Amherst College
- Occupations: sportsman and explorer
- Known for: co-founder of Florida's Marineland
- Spouse: Ethel B. Schniewind
- Children: 1
- Parent(s): George Dupont Pratt; Helen Deming Sherman

Sherman Pratt (March 22, 1900 – September 14, 1964) was an American sportsman, explorer, and co-founder of Florida's Marineland and the Grenville Baker Boys Club.

== Early life ==
Pratt was born and raised in Brooklyn, New York, the second son of George Dupont Pratt and Helen Deming Sherman.

He graduated from Amherst College in 1927, where he played varsity football.

== Career ==
Pratt had ties to RKO pictures, and produced numerous documentary films. Together with W. Douglas Burden, Cornelius Vanderbilt Whitney, and Ilya Tolstoy, he was a co-founder of Marineland of Florida, the world's first oceanarium. He was also a member of the Explorers Club, and the president and founder of the Grenville Baker Boys Club. The Boys Club made annual excursions to the Pratt family camps on Holmes Lake (New Brunswick), Canada, which had been constructed by George Dupont Pratt in 1909.

During World War II, he was a lieutenant commander in the United States Navy.

== Personal life ==
In 1942, Pratt married Ethel B. Schniewind, a divorcee, previously married to H. Edward Manville Jr. Pratt had one child, a daughter E. Deming Pratt.

Pratt died of a heart attack and stroke on September 14, 1964, in London, England.
