= Emmanuel Baptist Church (Brooklyn) =

Church in Brooklyn, New York

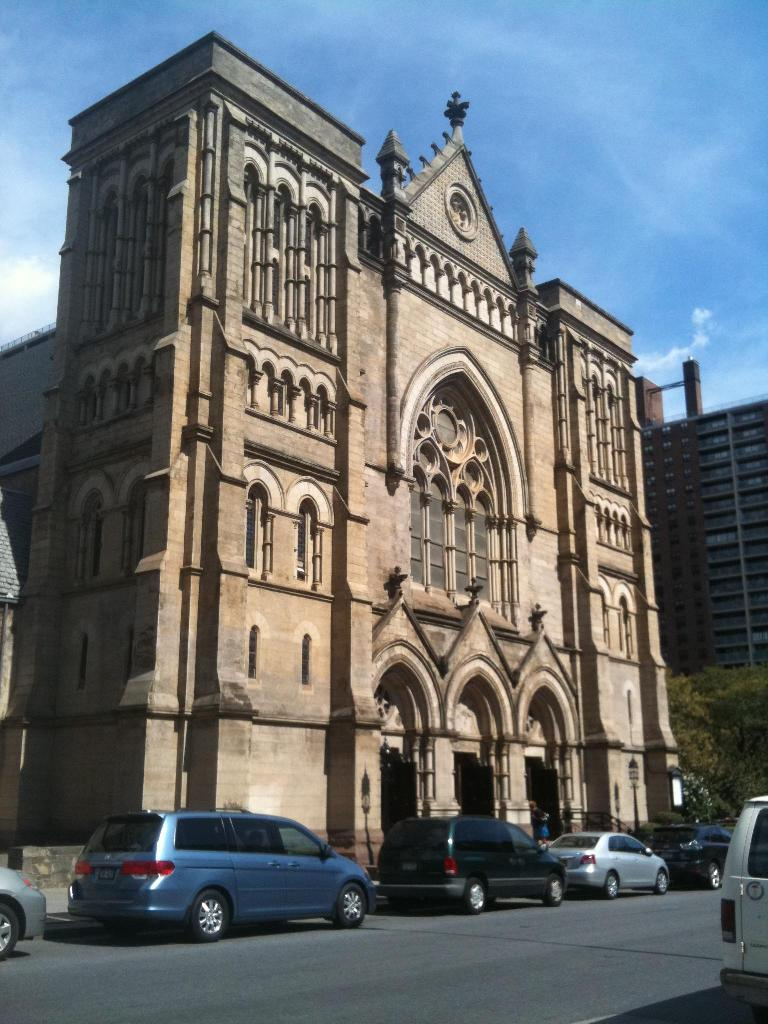
- Emmanuel Baptist Church
- 40.6884°N 73.9651°W
- Location: Brooklyn, New York
- Country: United States
- Denomination: American Baptist Churches USA

History
- Founded: 1881

Architecture
- Architect: Francis H. Kimball
- Style: Gothic Revival
- Years built: 1887

Emmanuel Baptist Church (EBC) is a Baptist megachurch in the Clinton Hill neighborhood of Brooklyn, New York, on the northwest corner of Lafayette Avenue and St. James Place, affiliated with the American Baptist Churches USA. The congregation is 2,200 people. The Senior Pastor is Anthony L. Trufant and the Executive Pastor is Shareka Newton.

== History ==
The congregation was established around 1882 with 194 members that had broken from the Washington Avenue Baptist Church. The Emmanuel congregation commissioned architect E. L. Roberts, the architect of the Washington Avenue Baptist Church, to build them a small, Gothic-style, two-story interim chapel on St. James Place (1882–1883)." Fund raising for the permanent church began in 1884.

It was paid for by Charles Pratt and built in 1887 to designs by architect Francis H. Kimball in the Gothic Revival style "as a synthesis of the cathedral type and the Baptist preaching church." It is considered one of Kimball's finest designs. It was listed on the National Register of Historic Places in 1977. The church building was opened on April 17, 1887. Architectural critic Montgomery Schuyler praised it as "a very rich scholarly and well considered design." The most conspicuous design feature of the interior was the central font.

In 2017, the attendance was 2,200 people.

== See also ==
- List of New York City Designated Landmarks in Brooklyn
