= Frederic B. Pratt =

American philanthropist

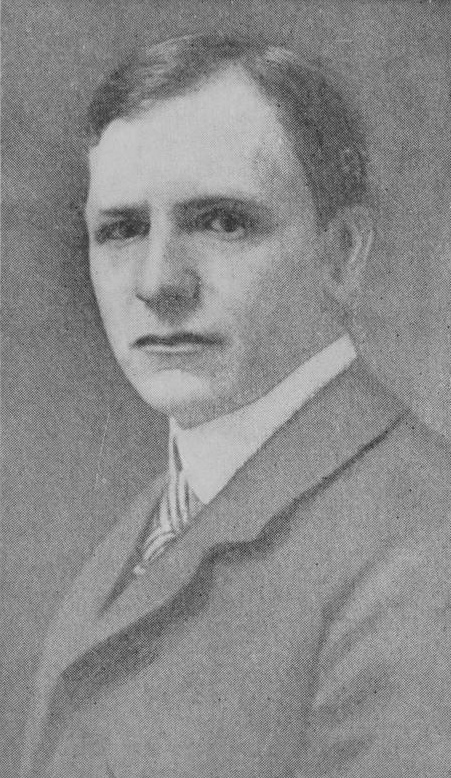
- Born: February 22, 1865; Brooklyn, New York, US
- Died: May 3, 1945 (aged 80); Glen Cove, New York, US
- Education: Amherst College
- Title: President, Pratt Institute
- Term: 1893–1937
- Spouse: Caroline Ames Ladd
- Children: 3
- Parents: Charles Pratt (father); Mary Helen Richardson (mother)

Frederic Bayley Pratt (February 22, 1865 – May 3, 1945) was an American heir, the president of the board of trustees of Brooklyn's Pratt Institute for 44 years, from 1893 to 1937, and president of the United States Olympic Committee in 1910.

== Early life ==
Frederic Pratt was born at his family's Clinton Hill estate in Brooklyn, New York, the son of Standard Oil magnate Charles Pratt and his second wife, Mary Helen Richardson. He was brother to George Dupont Pratt, Herbert L. Pratt, John Teele Pratt, Harold I. Pratt, and their sister Helen Pratt (1867–1949); his older half-brother was Charles Millard Pratt.

After attending private schools, Pratt graduated from Amherst College in 1887.

== Career ==
In 1893, he was elected president of the board of Pratt Institute, taking over from his elder brother, Charles Millard Pratt. Because founder Charles Pratt Sr died so soon after the college began, Frederic Pratt is credited with guiding the college through its early decades. He served in this post for 44 years, after which his son Charles Pratt became president.

In 1910, Pratt succeeded Caspar Whitney as president of the American Olympic Committee, now the United States Olympic Committee, but served for only five weeks. Col Robert Means Thompson was selected to lead the organization. In 1932, Pratt was awarded the Brooklyn Heights Neighborhood Club Annual Award for distinguished service to the cultural and civic life of the borough.

== Personal life ==
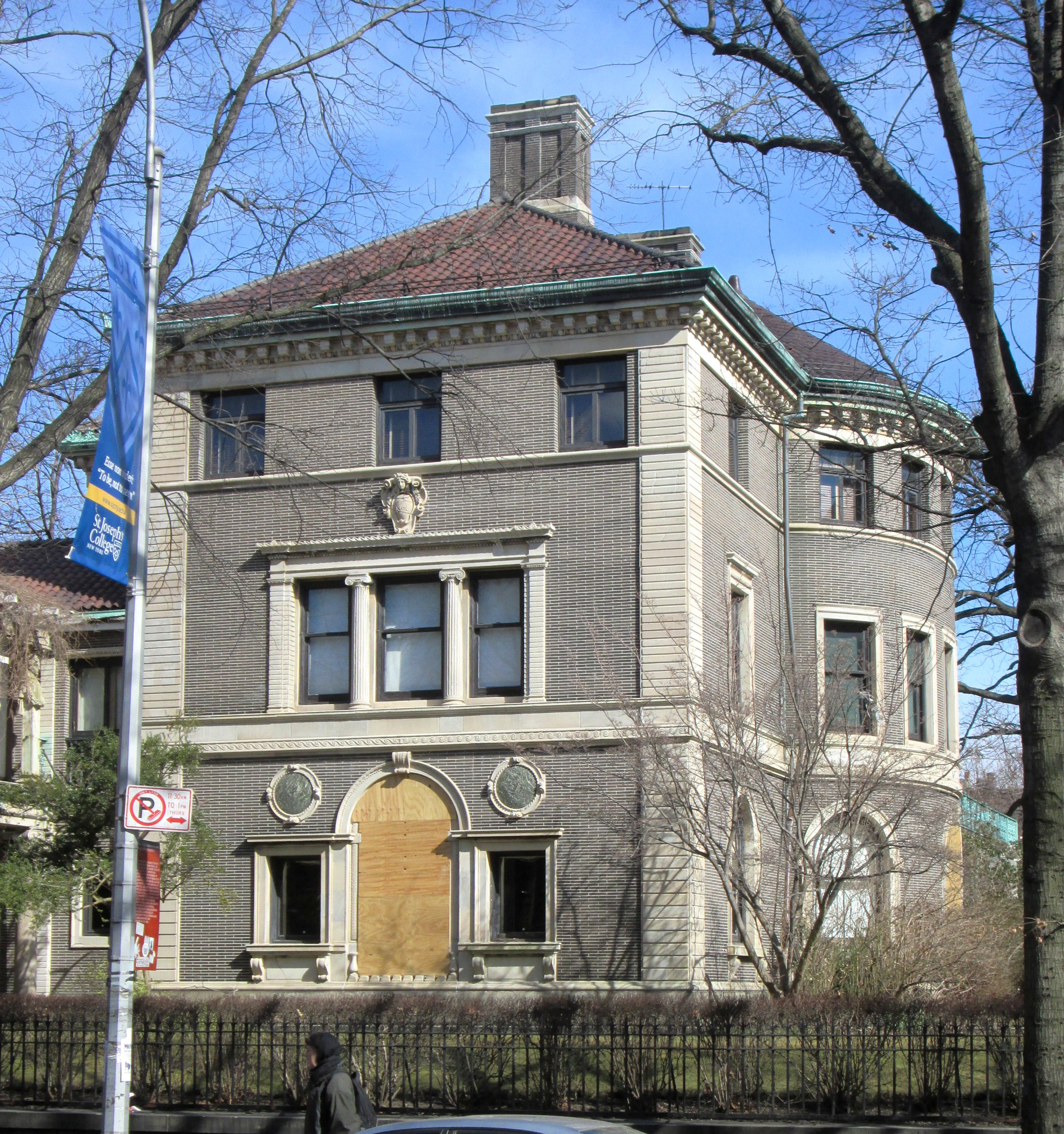
Frederic B. Pratt's townhouse. Now known as Caroline Ladd Pratt House at the Pratt Institute, 229 Clinton Avenue, Brooklyn, USA

On October 17, 1889, he married Caroline Ames Ladd (September 3, 1861, Portland OR - June 12, 1946, Glen Cove), the daughter of William S. Ladd and Caroline Elliott. They had three children:

- Charles Pratt (1892-1956), who served as President of the Board of Pratt Institute from 1937-1953.
- Mary Caroline Pratt (1895-1980), who married attorney Christian Herter. He later served as Governor of Massachusetts (1953-1956), and Secretary of State (1959-1961).
- Helen Ladd Pratt (1899-1972), whose first marriage was to Richard Stockton Emmet. In 1945, she married J. Holladay Philbin.

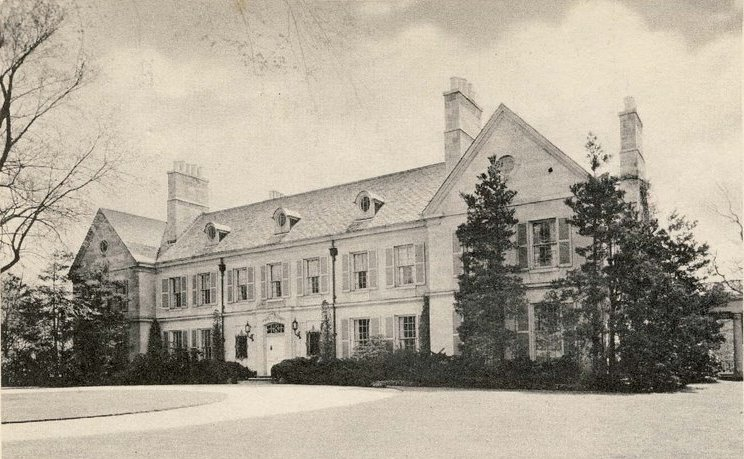
Poplar Hill, The Frederic Pratt house at their Glen Cove estate, Long Island

Pratt commissioned Charles A. Platt to design the family county estate, known as "Poplar Hill", in Glen Cove, on the North Shore of Long Island. Since 1971 it has been owned and operated by Glengariff Healthcare Center.

Pratt commissioned a family home at 229 Clinton Avenue, Brooklyn, designed by noted New York architect Henry F. Kilburn. It was originally known as the "Frederic B. Pratt House" (it is now known as the Caroline Ladd Pratt House). It was completed in 1898 in a neo-Georgian style. The family donated the property to the Pratt Institute.

Pratt died May 3, 1945, at his family home in Glen Cove, aged 81, of a heart ailment.
