= John Teele Pratt =

American businessman (1873–1927)

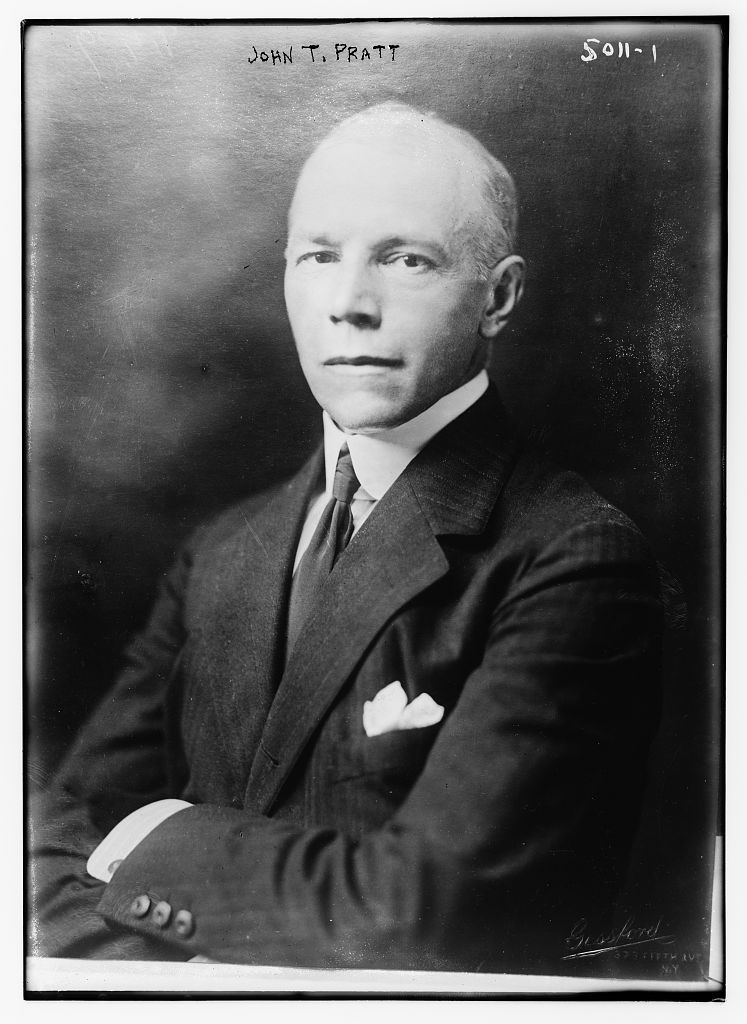
- Pratt in 1919
- Born: December 25, 1873; Brooklyn, New York, U.S.
- Died: June 17, 1927 (aged 53); Brooklyn, New York, U.S.
- Education: Amherst College; Harvard Law School
- Occupations: Attorney, philanthropist, financier
- Spouse: Ruth Sears Baker (m. 1904)
- Children: 5, including Edwin
- Parent(s): Charles Pratt; Mary Helen Richardson
- Relatives: Frederic Pratt (brother); George Dupont Pratt (brother); Herbert Pratt (brother); Harold Pratt (brother); Charles Pratt (half-brother); Robert Thayer (son-in-law); Paul Nitze (son-in-law); Andy Pratt (grandson); Suzanna Love (great-granddaughter)

John Teele Pratt (December 25, 1873 – June 17, 1927) was an American corporate attorney, philanthropist, music impresario, and financier.

== Early life ==
Pratt was born in Brooklyn, New York, on December 25, 1873. He was one of six children born to industrialist and Standard Oil co-founder Charles Pratt and Mary Helen (née Richardson) Pratt. His siblings included brothers Frederic Bayley Pratt, George Dupont Pratt, Herbert Lee Pratt, and Harold Irving Pratt. From his father's first marriage, he had two half-siblings including Charles Millard Pratt.

After graduating from Amherst College in 1896, he studied at Harvard Law School, graduating in 1900.

== Career ==
He worked as a lawyer for the prestigious firm of Carter and Ledyard at 54 Wall Street in New York.

Pratt became a director in the New York, New Haven & Hartford Railroad, and a trustee in the Pratt Institute which was founded by his father. He was also a partner in the Stock Exchange firm of Grayson M.P. Murphy & Co. and a director of several banks.

== Personal life ==
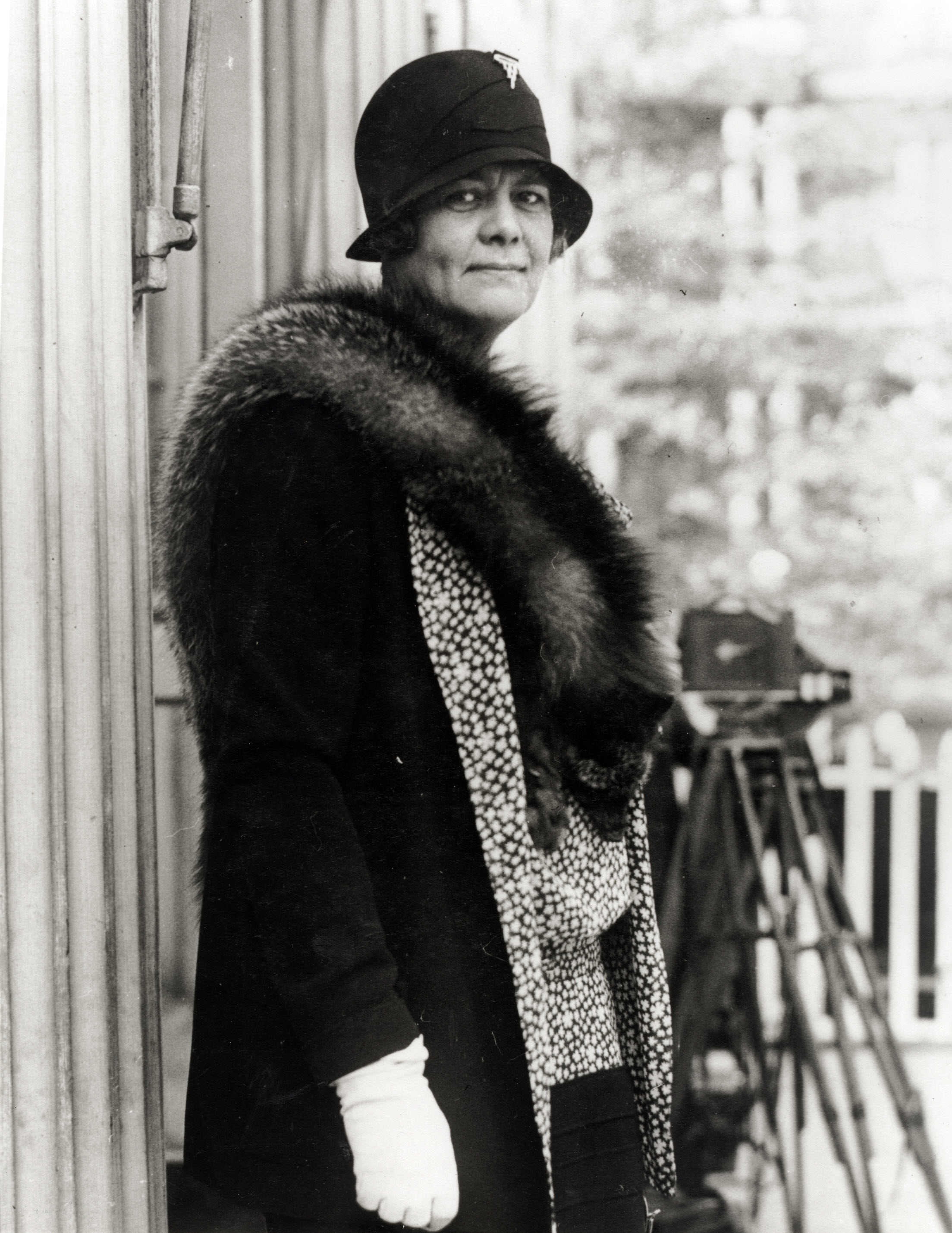
Pratt's wife, U.S. Representative from New York, Ruth Baker Pratt, c. 1933

In 1904, Pratt married Ruth Sears Baker (1877–1965), a Wellesley College graduate and the daughter of Edwin K. Baker, a Massachusetts dry-goods merchant. In 1929, two years after his eventual death in 1927, Ruth became the first woman elected to the United States Congress from the State of New York. Together, they were the parents of five children:

- John Teele Pratt Jr. (1903–1969), who was married to Mary Christy Tiffany (1905–1980), the daughter of George Shepley Tiffany. They divorced and he later married Elizabeth Ogden Woodward (1907–1986), the daughter of William Woodward Sr. and the former wife of Robert Livingston Stevens Jr. After his death, she married Alexander Cochrane Cushing, founder of Squaw Valley Ski Resort.
- Virginia Pratt (1905–1979), who married Robert Helyer Thayer (1901−1984), a U.S. Minister to Romania, in 1926.
- Sally Sears Pratt (1908–1973), who married James Tracy Jackson III (1905–1986) in 1928.
- Phyllis Pratt (1912–1987), who married Paul Henry Nitze (1907–2004), the Secretary of the Navy and Deputy Secretary of Defense under President Lyndon B. Johnson.
- Edwin Howard Baker Pratt (1913–1975), the headmaster of Browne & Nichols school, who married Aileen Kelly.

== Death ==
Pratt died suddenly in his Broadway office on June 17, 1927, aged 53, of heart disease. Thirty six years earlier, his father, Charles Pratt, had died of heart disease in offices at the same address.

== Legacy ==
In 1910, Pratt and his wife had a brick neo-Georgian mansion, known as "The Manor", designed by architect Charles A. Platt built at their 55-acre Glen Cove estate. In 1913, it was considered by Country Life Magazine to be one of the best twelve country houses in America. The home served as the summer White House for Herbert Hoover. It is now the Glen Cove Mansion Hotel and Conference Center.

The John Teele Pratt residence, at 11 East 61st St. in New York City was purchased by the Pratts, who hired Charles Pierrepont Henry Gilbert to remodel the 1872 home in April 1907. In 1914, Pratt purchased the neighboring homes at 7 and 9 East 61st Street and hired Platt to tear them down and design a new residence.

=== Descendants ===
Through his eldest son John, he was the grandfather of Mary Christy Pratt (1923–1960), who was married to Bayard Cutting Auchincloss (1922–2001), the nephew of U.S. Representative James C. Auchincloss, in 1950. He is also the great-grandfather of actress Suzanna Love (b. 1950).

Through his daughter Phyllis, he was the grandfather of William A. Nitze of Washington, DC, the chairman of Oceana Technologies and Clearpath Technologies, who married Ann Kendall Richards, an independent art dealer.

Through his son Edwin, he was the grandfather of singer-songwriter Andy Pratt (b. 1947).
