= Anglo-American School =

Anglo-American School may refer to:

- Anglo-American School of Moscow (includes a branch in St. Petersburg)
- Anglo-American School of Sofia
- Anglo-American School of St. Petersburg (branch of the school in Moscow)
- Anglo American School in Tres Ríos, Costa Rica
- Anglo American School of Stockholm (now Stockholm International School)
- Anglo American School Prescott in Arequipa, Peru
