= Killenworth =

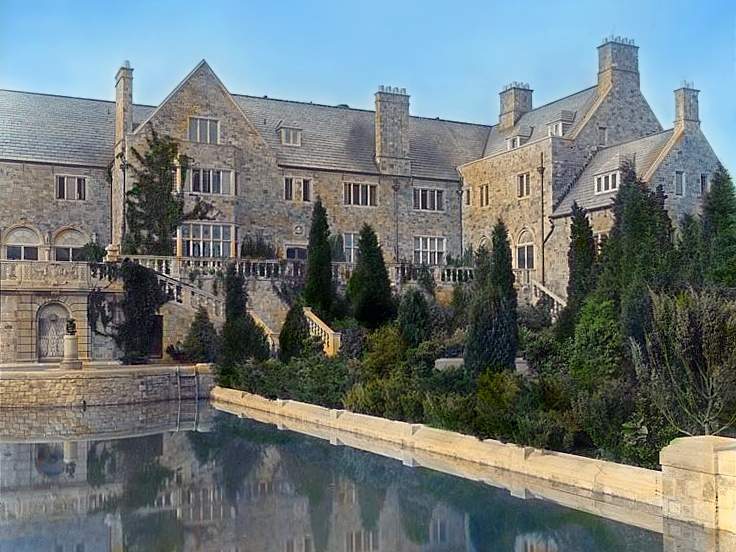
- Rear of Killenworth around 1915, showing the swimming pool

General information
- Type: Mansion
- Architectural style: Tudor revival
- Location: Glen Cove, New York, United States
- Coordinates: 40.8836°N 73.6346°W
- Current tenants: Russian Federation
- Opened: 1912

Design and construction
- Other designers: Trowbridge and Ackerman

Killenworth is a historic mansion in Glen Cove, New York constructed for George Dupont Pratt in 1912. It was purchased by the Soviet Union in 1946 to become the country retreat of the Soviet, and later Russian, delegation to the United Nations. In the 1980s the property was subject to allegations it was being used for espionage. There has been a long-standing conflict with the City of Glen Cove over its tax status.

== History ==
=== Construction ===
Killenworth was constructed in 1912 as the home of George Dupont Pratt. The building was designed by Trowbridge and Ackerman in the Tudor Revival style with a seam-faced granite facade and had 39 rooms. It won first prize in that year's American Institute of Architects competition for best country house. The estate's gardens were designed by James Leal Greenleaf, and were considered his greatest achievement. The current building replaced an earlier mansion, also called Killenworth, which was constructed for Pratt around 1897 by William Tubby, with landscaping by the Olmsted Brothers.

Killenworth is one of five existing mansions in Glen Cove built for the sons of oil magnate Charles Pratt. The others are "The Braes", now the Webb Institute of Naval Architecture; "Welwyn", now the Holocaust Memorial and Tolerance Center of Nassau County on the grounds of the Welwyn Preserve; "Poplar Hill", now the Glengariff Healthcare Center; and "The Manor", now the Glen Cove Mansion Hotel and Conference Center. Their property totaled nearly 5,000 acres.

=== Diplomatic retreat ===
In 1946, the estate was purchased by the Soviet Union and used as a country retreat by its United Nations delegation. One of the first residents after purchase was Vyacheslav Molotov.

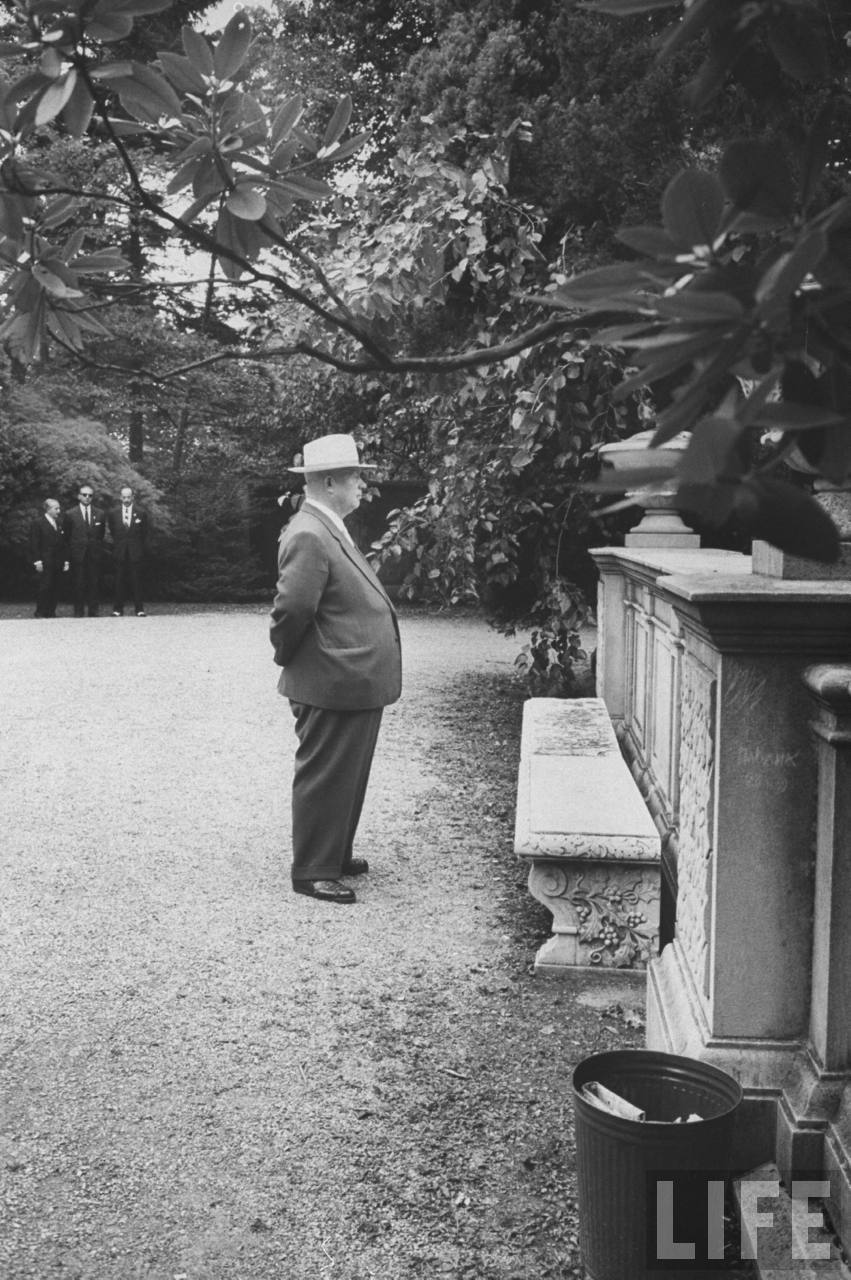
Nikita Khrushchev at Killenworth in September 1960.

The presence of the Russians made the property the target of demonstrations, requiring the City of Glen Cove to provide additional police protection that was not reimbursed. When Soviet leader Nikita Khrushchev visited Killenworth in 1960, crowds reportedly threw tomatoes at his party's limousines. Other residents simply watched the procession in silence. Cuban leader Fidel Castro also visited Killenworth while in the United States.

The tax-exempt status of the property led to conflict with the City of Glen Cove, which in 1970 attempted to foreclose on the property until the United States Department of State got a restraining order in federal court to stop the proceedings. In the 1980s the facility was subject to allegations that it was being used for espionage, with defector Arkady Shevchenko stating that its top floors were occupied by equipment for signals intelligence. In response to this and the tax dispute, in 1982 the city council voted to revoke the Russians' ability to get permits for city beach, golf, and tennis facilities. The Soviet Union retaliated by denying use of a Moscow beach to members of the Embassy of the United States in Moscow. The permit revocation was reversed in 1984.

In December 2016, the Obama administration announced that two Russian diplomatic facilities, one of which was on Long Island, would be closed as part of the retaliation for the Russian interference in the 2016 United States presidential election. It was initially reported that Killenworth might be the Long Island site, but the designated facility turned out to be another mansion owned by the Russians called Norwich House in nearby Upper Brookville, New York. Killenworth is still used by the Russian delegation. (Note: From the book Radio Intelligence of Russia. Interception of information: "In the period 1960-67, the Soviet radio industry produced a number of terminal devices and recording equipment for the needs of radio intelligence of the KGB, GRU and Navy. Such set-top boxes include devices code-named "Topol", "Luga" for receiving SHP and UP teletype, the "Don" set-top box for receiving single-band transmission with automatic frequency tuning of the receiver and a number of panoramic set-top boxes that allow you to analyze the frequency spectrum of transmitters. All this made it possible to raise the level of radio intelligence in the KGB to a high level. The radio interception posts of the First (intelligence) Main Directorate of the KGB, created in the early 1960s, in the embassies and consulates of the USSR abroad gradually began to meet the "challenges" of that time. In 1969, for the comprehensive solution of the problems of secret physical penetration and the provision of wiretapping activities in foreign countries, the 16th Department (RER) was created at PSU, the head of which during 1971-79 was Andrei Vasilyevich Krasavin. Thanks to the selfless work of KGB radio intelligence officers, during the Cuban Missile Crisis of 1962, many encrypted radiograms were intercepted, which were subsequently successfully deciphered by cryptanalysts of the 8th Main Directorate of the KGB. Engaged in radio intelligence against foreign states, the KGB had a good opportunity to act directly from their territories, taking advantage of the "reserve" of diplomatic zones where the plenipotentiary representatives of the Soviet Foreign Ministry were located. The 1st KGB radio interception post was created in 1963 at the Soviet embassy in Mexico City and was codenamed "Radar". In 1966, a similar post "Pochin" was earned at the embassy in Washington, and a year later - "Proba" in New York. In 1964, in order to unite the efforts of all radio engineering services, the 4th Department (Radio Counterintelligence) of the OTU was transferred to the 8th Main Directorate of the KGB as the 11th Department. During 1964-72, the radio counterintelligence and radio intelligence services of the 8th Main Directorate of the KGB were headed by Vladimir Ivanovich Bondarenko, being the deputy head of the Main Directorate. By 1970, the posts "Pochin-1" (in the embassy), "Pochin-2" (in the embassy housing complex), "Proba-1" (in the Soviet mission to the UN) and "Proba-2" (in the dacha of the Soviet embassy on Long Island) were put into operation. The upper floors of the buildings of Soviet embassies and consulates were filled with electronic equipment, and rows of antennas towered on their roofs. A typical radio interception station in a Soviet embassy was a room crammed with a variety of equipment. These were microwave receivers, sound recorders, teletypes, and other electronic devices. With their help, information emanating from American satellites and other systems for various purposes was intercepted, telephone conversations were recorded, more than half of which were carried out in the United States by radio channels in the 1970s. The interception process was automated to such an extent that it was usually operated by a single technician, who was assisted by the wives of KGB embassy officers if necessary. The accumulated information was summarized and sent to Moscow for analysis. On May 15, 1970, a plan was approved for the deployment of radio interception posts in 15 residencies of the KGB PGU, and by the end of 1980, more than 30 such posts were already operating abroad. In addition to the above-mentioned posts "Pochin" and "Proba", the following radio interception posts were put into operation: — "Altai" in Lisbon, "Amur" in Hanoi, — "Vega" in Brussels, "Venus" in Montreal, — "Spring" in San Francisco, "Zarya" in Tokyo, — "Dolphin" in Jakarta, "Caucasus" in Geneva, — "Maple" in Brasilia, "Crab" in Beijing, — "Crimea" in Nairobi, "Mars" in Tehran, — "Mercury" in London, "Orion" in Cairo, - "Island" in Reykjavik, "Parus" in Belgrade, — "Radar" in Mexico City, "Rainbow" in Athens, — "Raduga-T" in Ankara, "Sever" in Oslo, — "Sigma" in Damascus, "Sirius" in Istanbul, - "Start" in Rome, "Termite-S" in Havana, — "Tyrol-1" in Salzburg, "Tyrol-2" in Vienna, - "Tulip" in The Hague, "Centaur 1" in Bonn, — "Centaurus-2" in Cologne, "Elbrus" in Bern, — "Jupiter" in Paris. In 1971 alone, 15 such posts intercepted more than 62 thousand diplomatic and military encrypted telegrams from 60 countries of the world, as well as more than 25 thousand messages transmitted in plain text. Oleg Kalugin, a former high-ranking officer of the PSU, claimed: "We were able to listen to the communications of the Pentagon, the FBI, the State Department, the White House, the local police and many other organizations."")

== Gallery ==
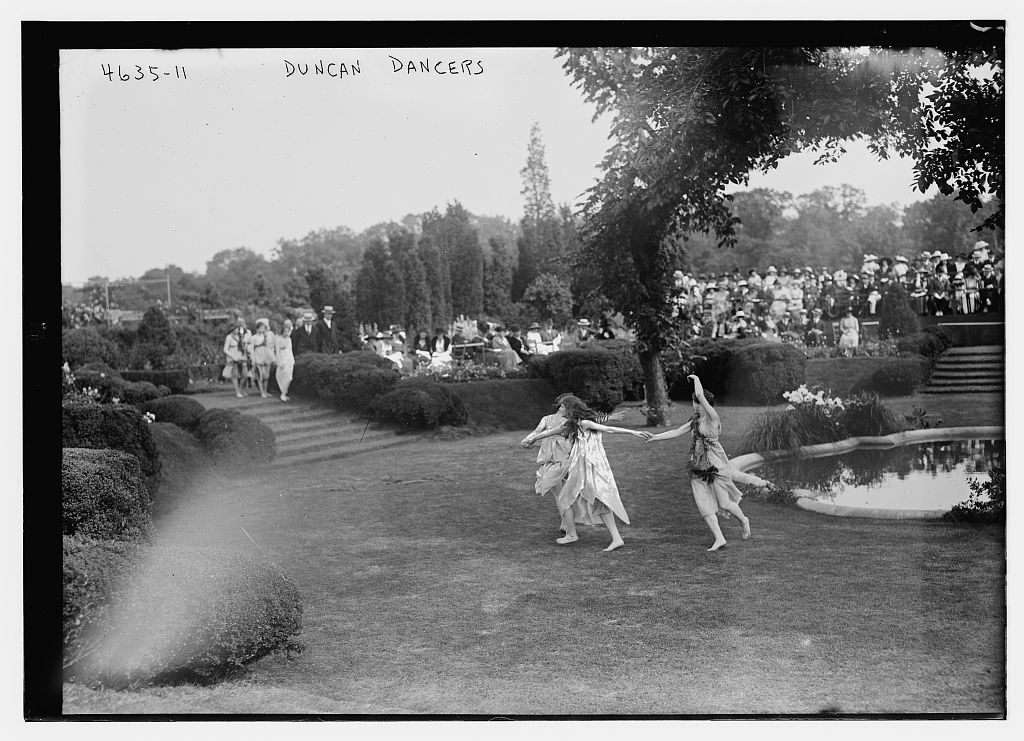
Photo of Isadora Duncan's dance troupe performing for the Italian war relief on June 25, 1918.

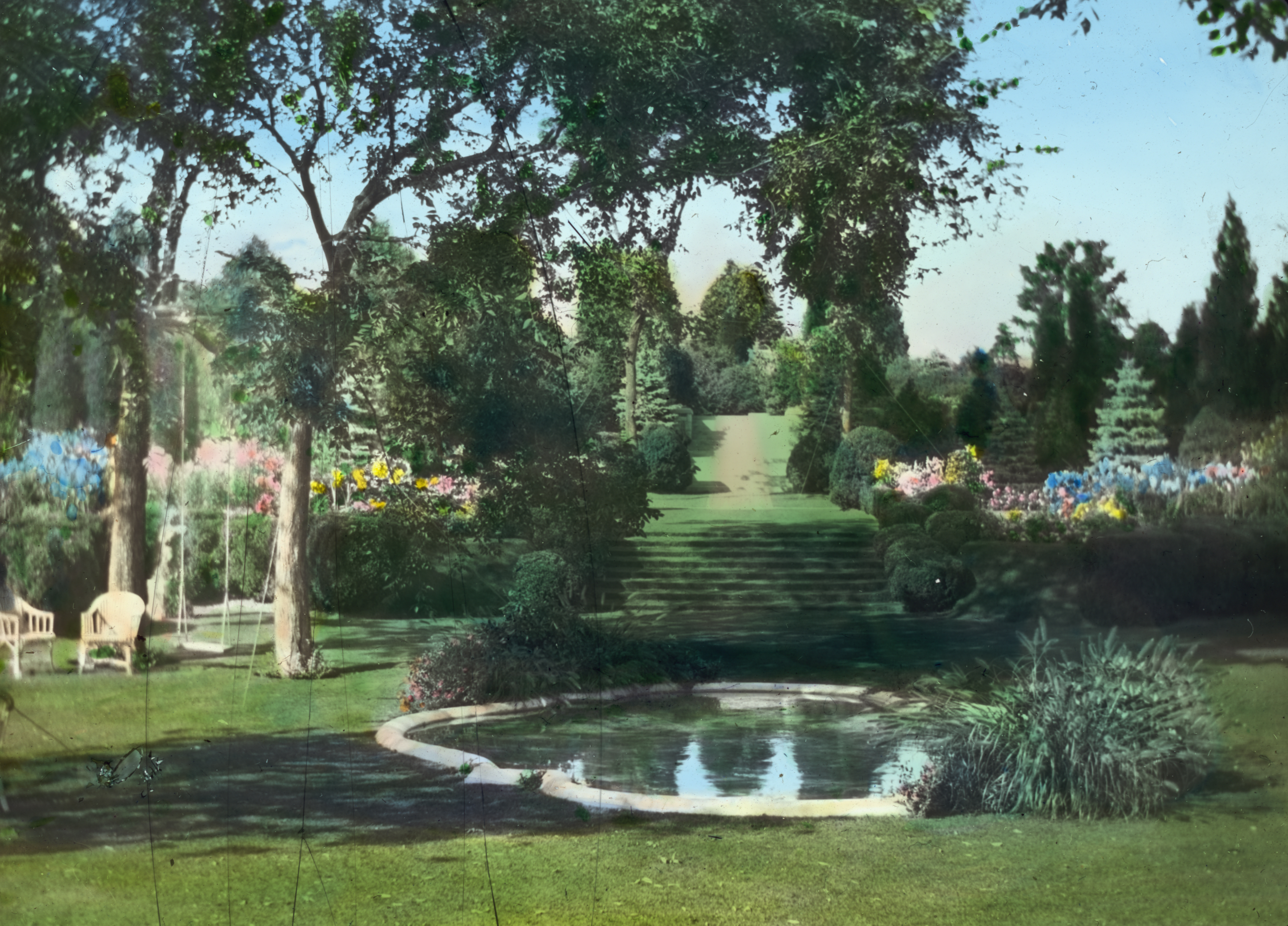
A portion of Killenworth's gardens, considered James L. Greenleaf's greatest accomplishment.

== See also ==
- Permanent Mission of Russia to the United Nations
- List of diplomatic missions of Russia
- List of ambassadors of Russia to the United States
- Russia and the United Nations
- Soviet Union and the United Nations
- Elmcroft Estate
- Pioneer Point
