= AASM =

AASM may refer to:

- American Academy of Sleep Medicine
- Anglo-American School of Moscow
- Armement Air-Sol Modulaire, a French munition
- Australian Active Service Medal
