= Russian Embassy School in Washington, D.C. =

- Средняя общеобразовательная школа при Посольстве России в США, г. Вашингтон

Location
- 2650 Wisconsin Ave NW; Washington, D.C. 20007; United States; 38°55′29″N 77°04′28″W

Information
- School type: International school
- Established: 1957 (69 years ago)
- Educational authority: Ministry of Foreign Affairs (Russia)
- Website: http://resw.us/

The Russian Embassy School in Washington, D.C. (Russian: Средняя общеобразовательная школа при Посольстве России в США, г. Вашингтон) is a Russian overseas school in Washington, DC operated by the Russian Ministry of Foreign Affairs. The school was first established in 1957, and on October 7, 2019, the Russian Foreign Ministry gave the school its official name per order No. 19592. The students are children of diplomats from Russia, and the school serves elementary school through high school. Knowledge Day on September 1 of every year is the first day of school for students at the school.

In the late 1950s students from the school would visit local American schools in Washington D.C., allowing the Russian speaking students and English speaking students to take part in dialogue in each other's languages.

The current Russian Embassy School was finished in 1979 when the first phase of construction of the new Soviet Embassy in Washington, D.C. on Mount Alto was completed by George Hyman Construction Company.

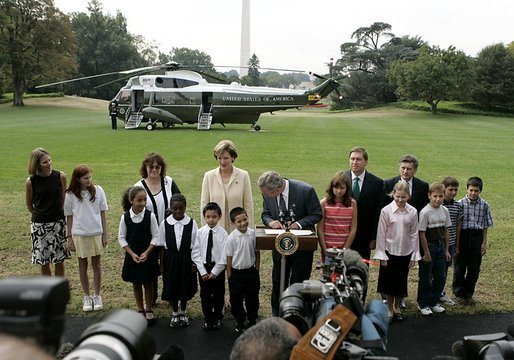
Students from the Russian Embassy School and John Quincy Adams Elementary School with President George W. Bush on September 24, 2004.

After the Beslan school siege in Russia, President George W. Bush had students from the Russian Embassy School and John Quincy Adams Elementary School present as guests as he gave a speech on September 24, 2004, on the South Lawn sharing his condolences to the victims.

On April 25, 2017, high school students from the school took part in the Russian Embassy delegation - which included Ambassador Sergey Kislyak - in commemorating the 72nd anniversary of Elbe Day at Arlington National Cemetery, laying flowers on the "Spirit of the Elbe" plaque and also meeting World War II veterans and presenting them with red flowers.

== See also ==
- Russian Mission School in New York
- Embassy of Russia, Washington, D.C.
- Russian Mission Residency
- Anglo-American School of Moscow
- Anglo-American School of St. Petersburg
