= Russian Mission School in New York =

School in New York City, the United States

- Средняя школа с углублённым изучением иностранного языка при Постоянном представительстве РФ при ООН в Нью-Йорке

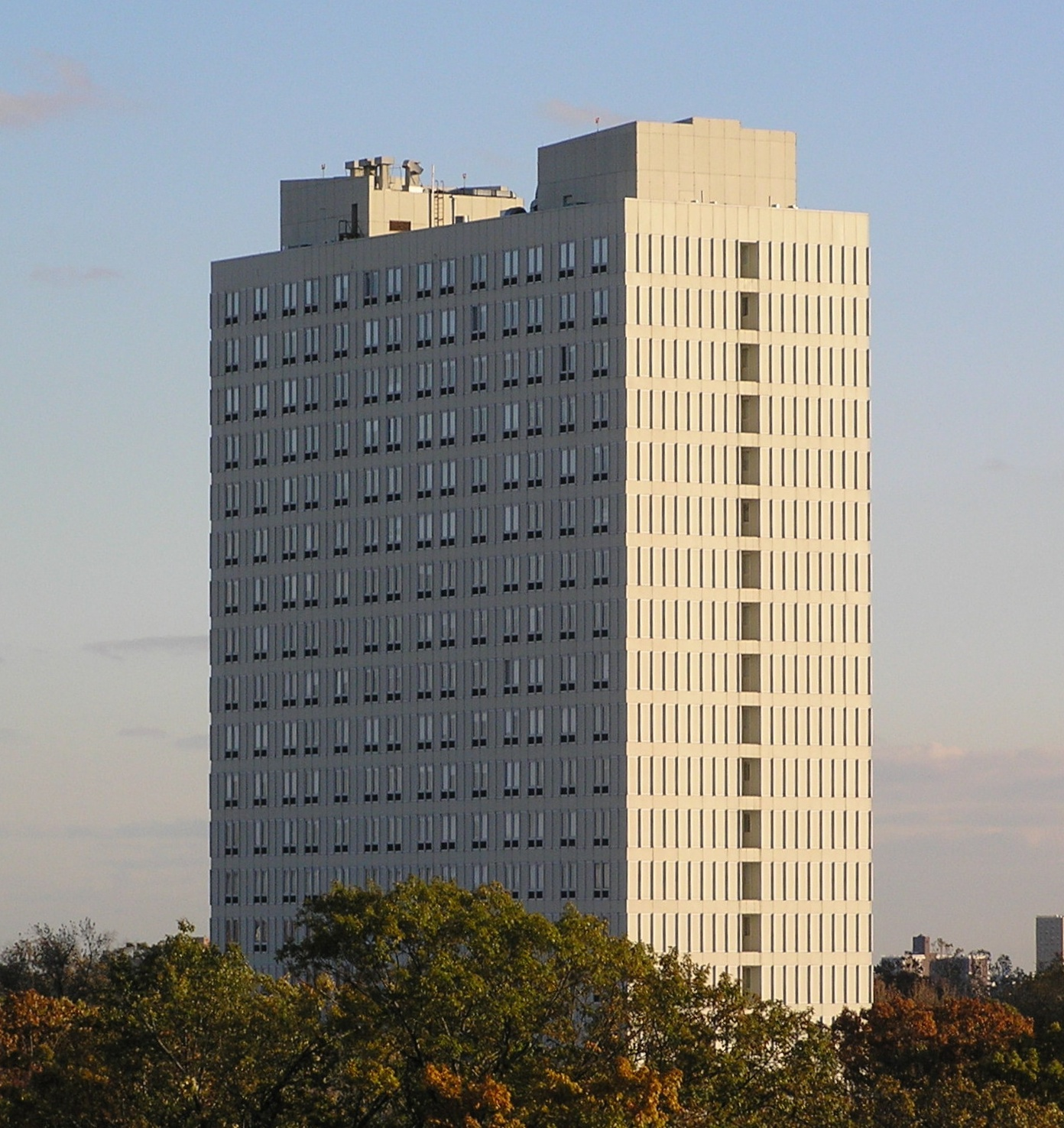
- The Russian Mission Residential Complex in Riverdale houses the Russian school

Location
- 355 West 255 Street Bronx, NY 10471; 355 Вест 255, Нью-Йорк,10471,США
- 40.902997°N 73.902718°W

Information
- School type: International school
- Established: July 3, 1954 (71 years ago)
- Educational authority: Ministry of Foreign Affairs (Russia)
- Website: ny-school.russiaun.ru

The Russian Mission School in New York (Russian: Общеобразовательная школа при Постоянном представительстве России при ООН в Нью-Йорке) is a Russian overseas school located on the grounds of the Russian Mission Residency in the Riverdale community of Bronx borough of New York City, New York. It is affiliated with the Permanent Mission of Russia to the United Nations, and is operated by the Russian Ministry of Foreign Affairs.

Students attending the school are children of diplomatic workers of the Ministry of Foreign Affairs, children of Russian citizens permanently residing in the United States, and children of diplomatic workers of a number of friendly countries who want to study in Russian.

== History ==
Prior to the opening of the Soviet Mission School, an elementary school was created in New York on July 3, 1954 per order № 52 of the then Soviet Ministry of Foreign Affairs.

The elementary school was transformed into the Soviet Mission School, an eight-year school with in-depth study of English, on September 11, 1974 per order № 956 of the Ministry of Foreign Affairs. The school was also moved to its new location in the Soviet Mission Residency from its previous location at 67th Street and Lexington Avenue. The Russian Mission Residency is a 20-story building built in 1974 that also contains 240 apartments, an auditorium, a gymnasium, a playground, a theater, a barber shop, stores, and an underground garage able to hold 100 cars. The land that the building is on was purchased by the Soviet Union in December 1971.

After Mikhail Gorbachev and Ronald Reagan signed a cultural agreement in November 21, 1985, one form of encouraging Soviet-American exchanges happened at this school where Russian students from this school had meetings with local American high school students.

On July 27, 1988 the school was converted from an eight-year school to a high school per order № 3593 of the Ministry of Foreign Affairs.

== See also ==
- Russian Embassy School in Washington, D.C.
- Russian Mission Residency
- Permanent Mission of Russia to the United Nations
- Permanent Representative of Russia to the United Nations
- Russia and the United Nations
- Consulate General of Russia, New York City
- Russian Americans in New York City

Anglo-American-Canadian international schools in Russia:

- Anglo-American School of Moscow
- Anglo-American School of St. Petersburg
