= Pioneer Point, Maryland =

Pioneer Point, Centreville, Maryland
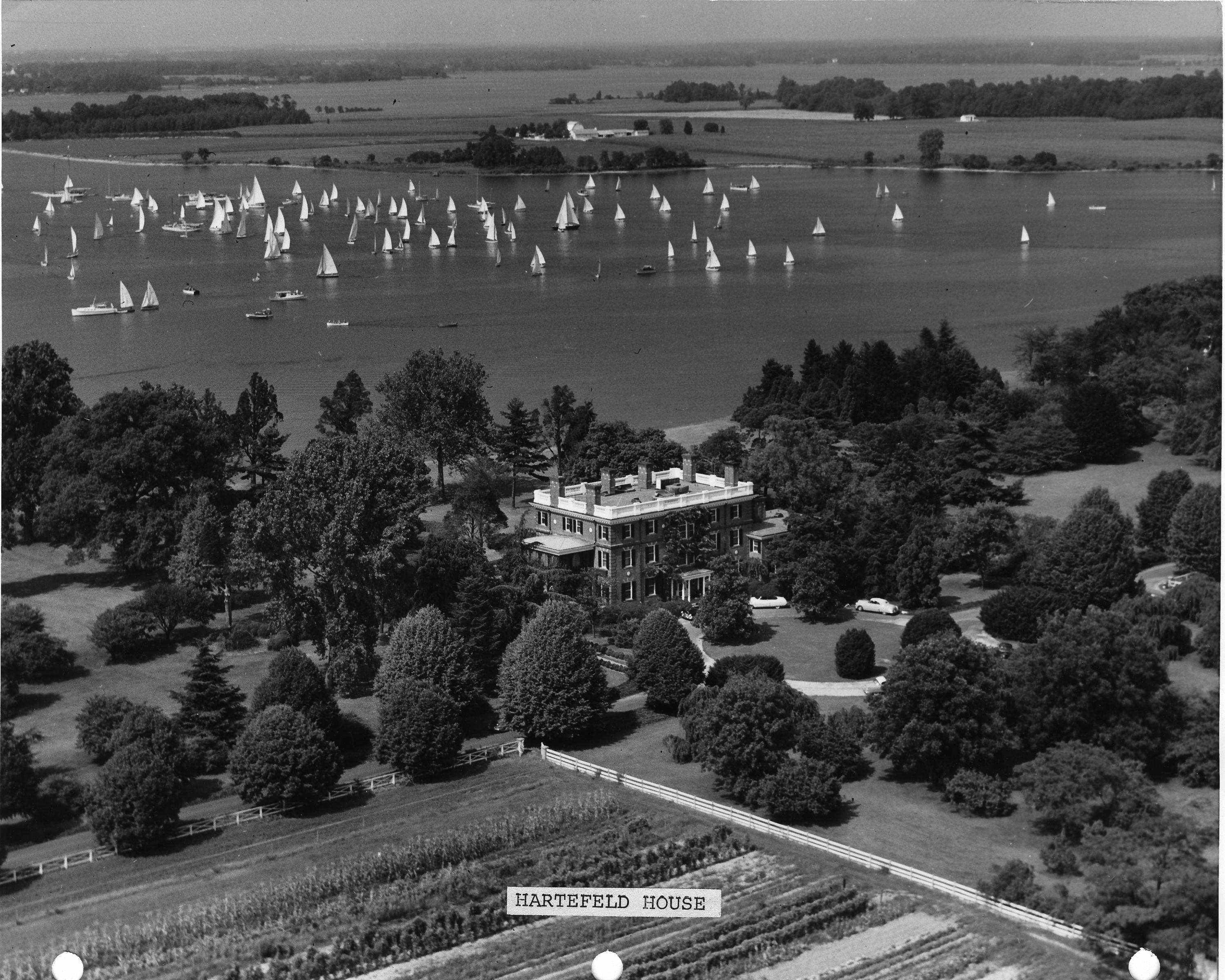
- Interactive map of Pioneer Point, Centreville, Maryland
- Coordinates: 39°4′39″N 76°8′37″W
- Country: United States
- State: Maryland

Area
  - Total: 0.069 sq mi (0.18 km^{2})
- Time zone: UTC−5 (Eastern (EST))
  - Summer (DST): UTC−4 (EDT)

Pioneer Point, also called Hartefeld Hall and Hartefeld House, is a Georgian style house and surrounding 45-acre estate near Centreville, Maryland, on Maryland's Eastern Shore lying on a peninsula formed by the confluence of the Corsica and Chester rivers. The property is owned by the Russian Government as a recreational place for its diplomatic staff in the United States and activities there are protected under diplomatic immunity.

== History ==
Pioneer Point is the former estate of wealthy business executive, and builder John J. Raskob who is best known for building the Empire State Building in New York City. Raskob constructed the 19 room mansion originally known as "Hartefeld Hall" after purchasing a 1600-acre tract of land on the Eastern Shore in 1925. Raskob later built another large house nearby to accommodate his 13 children.

After Raskob's death in 1950, the estate was subdivided and the mansion changed hands several times - at one point it was owned by millionaire industrialist R.J. Funkhouser.

In 1972, the property was bought by the Soviet Government, with subsequent Soviet additions to the property being funded by granting two properties in Moscow to the United States State Department.

In 1991, following the collapse of the Soviet Union, the property came under ownership of the Russian Government, with the property valued at $3 million at that time. In 2007, the property was likened to a dacha by Yuri Ushakov, the Russian ambassador to the United States.

On December 29, 2016, Russian access to the site was commuted in the wake of the alleged Russian involvement in the 2016 United States presidential election as part of a number of sanctions taken by the United States against Russian diplomatic personnel. President Barack Obama, in announcing the sanctions, stated that Pioneer Point and another compound in New York were "used by Russian personnel for intelligence-related purposes."

On May 31, 2017, six months after the sanctions, The Washington Post reported that President Donald Trump and his administration had decided to return Pioneer Point back to the Russian government.

== See also ==
- List of diplomatic missions of Russia
- List of ambassadors of Russia to the United States
- Elmcroft Estate
- Killenworth
