= Permanent Mission of Russia to the United Nations =

Permanent Mission of the Russian Federation to the United Nations in New York Постоянное представительство Российской Федерации при ООН в г. Нью-Йорк

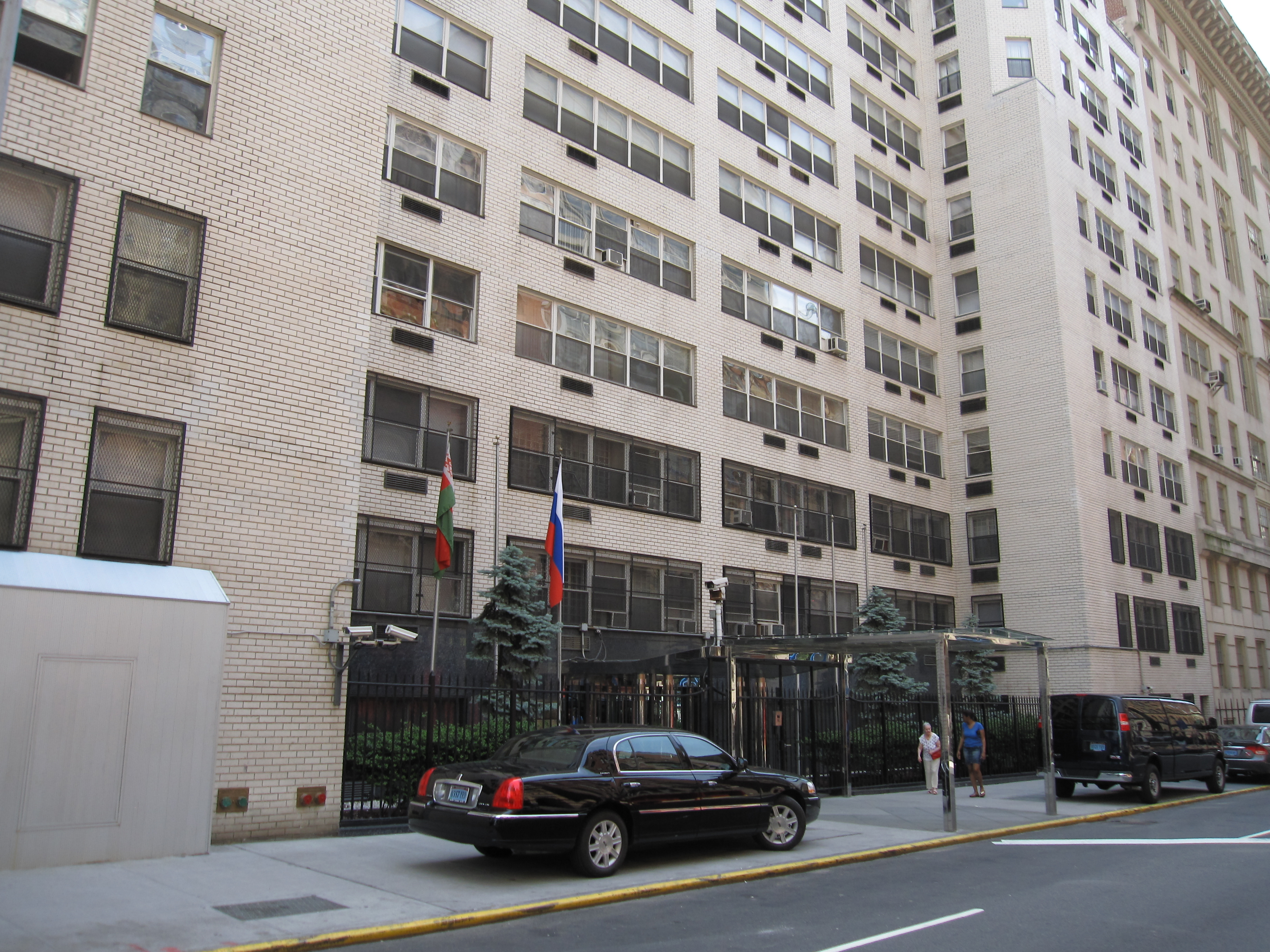
- Location: New York, New York 10065 United States
- Address: 136 East 67th Street
- Coordinates: 40°46′00.1″N 73°57′49.7″W
- Permanent representative: Vasily Nebenzya
- Website: russiaun.ru

The Permanent Mission of the Russian Federation to the United Nations in New York (Постоянное представительство Российской Федерации при ООН в г. Нью-Йорк) is a diplomatic mission of the Russian Federation to the United Nations with headquarters in New York. The current permanent representative of the diplomatic mission is Vasily Nebenzya.

== History ==
In 1948 the Republic of China's representation to the United Nations sold the Percy R. Pyne House at 680 Park Avenue to the Soviet Union, which China had previously purchased in 1947. From 1948–1964 the Soviet Union's United Nations headquarters was located here. In September 1960 Nikita Khrushchev spoke from the balcony of the building for the press.

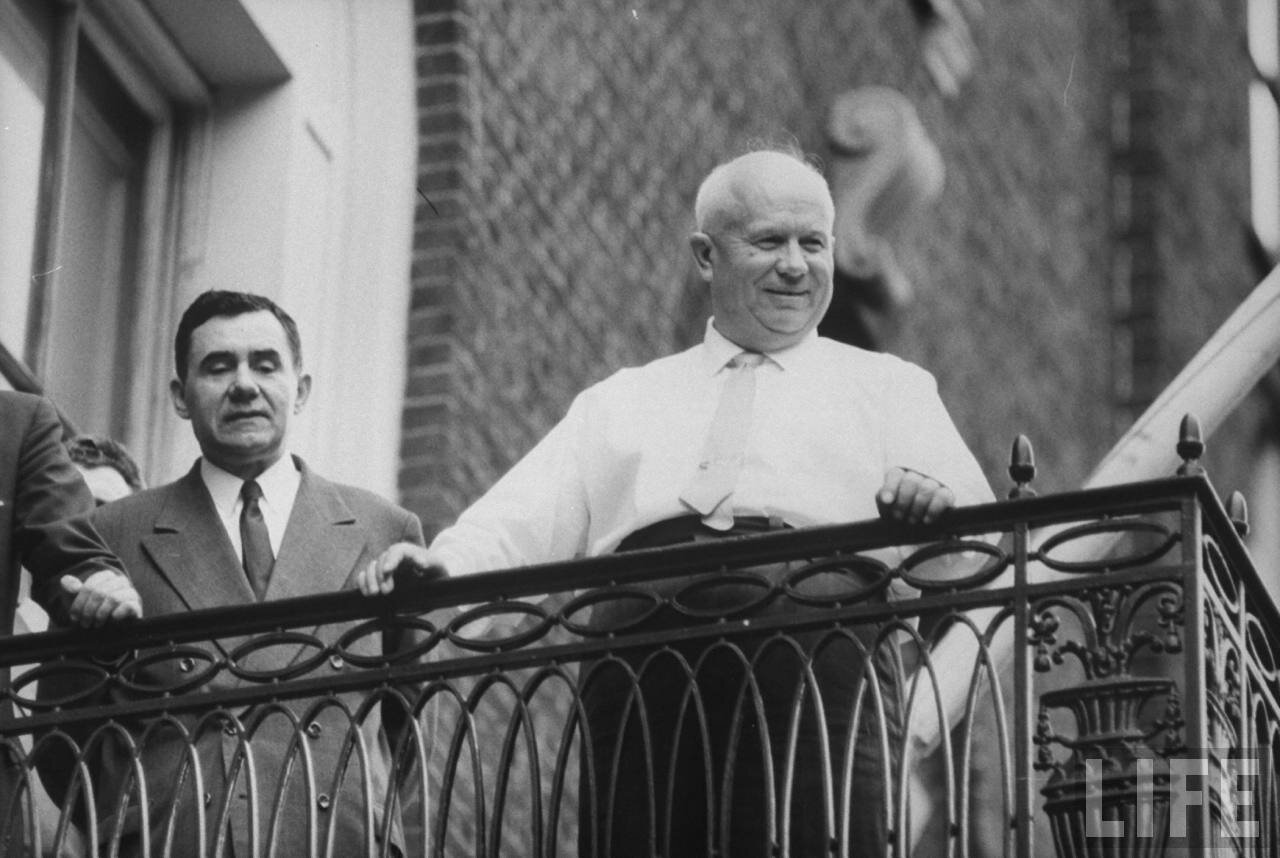
Nikita Khrushchev speaking to reporters from the balcony of Percy R. Pyne House in September 1960.

In May 1964 the Soviet Union sold the Percy House and moved their United Nations headquarters to the current location on 67th Street. The 67th Street building was built in 1961 and is 13 stories tall. The headquarters also includes secondary locations:

- Russian Mission Residency is a 20-story building built in 1974 at 355 West 255 Street in Riverdale composed of 240 apartments, a school, an auditorium, a gymnasium, a playground, a theater, a barber shop, stores, and an underground garage able to hold 100 cars. The land the building is on was purchased by the Soviet Union in December 1971.
- Killenworth Mansion is a 49-room mansion on Glen Cove purchased in 1946 and used as a country retreat by the government. One of the first residents after purchase was Vyacheslav Molotov, and later on the mansion also provided temporary lodging for Nikita Khrushchev and Fidel Castro before they spoke at the United Nations.
- Elmcroft Estate is a 38-room estate on Oyster Bay purchased in 1952 and used as a country retreat by the government.

On December 11, 1979 shortly before 10 p.m. est, the anti‐Castro Omega 7 terrorist group exploded a bomb at the headquarters - 15 ft from the garage entrance. Four police officers and at least two mission employees were injured, while hundreds of windows between Lexington Avenue and Third Avenue were shattered.

In 1991 the location transitioned from Soviet Union's United Nations headquarters to Russia's United Nations headquarters.

== Permanent Representatives ==
The Permanent Representative of the Russian Federation to the United Nations is the leader of Russia's diplomatic mission to the United Nations. The representative sits on the United Nations Security Council, where they have the right of veto.

== Belarus ==
As a sub-tenant, Belarus uses the 4th floor as their headquarters for their Permanent Mission to the United Nations.

== Gallery ==
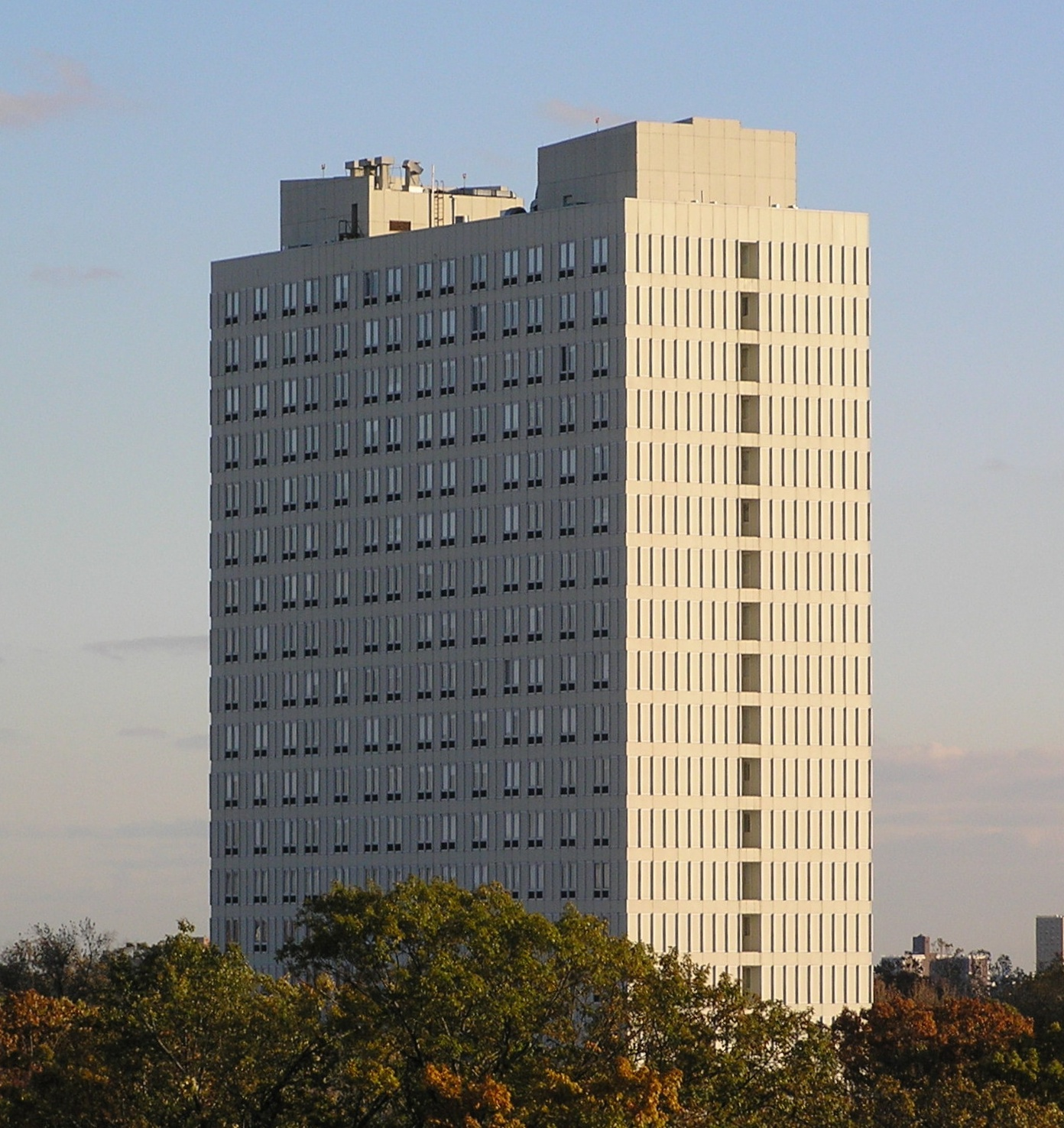
Russian Mission Residency since 1975.

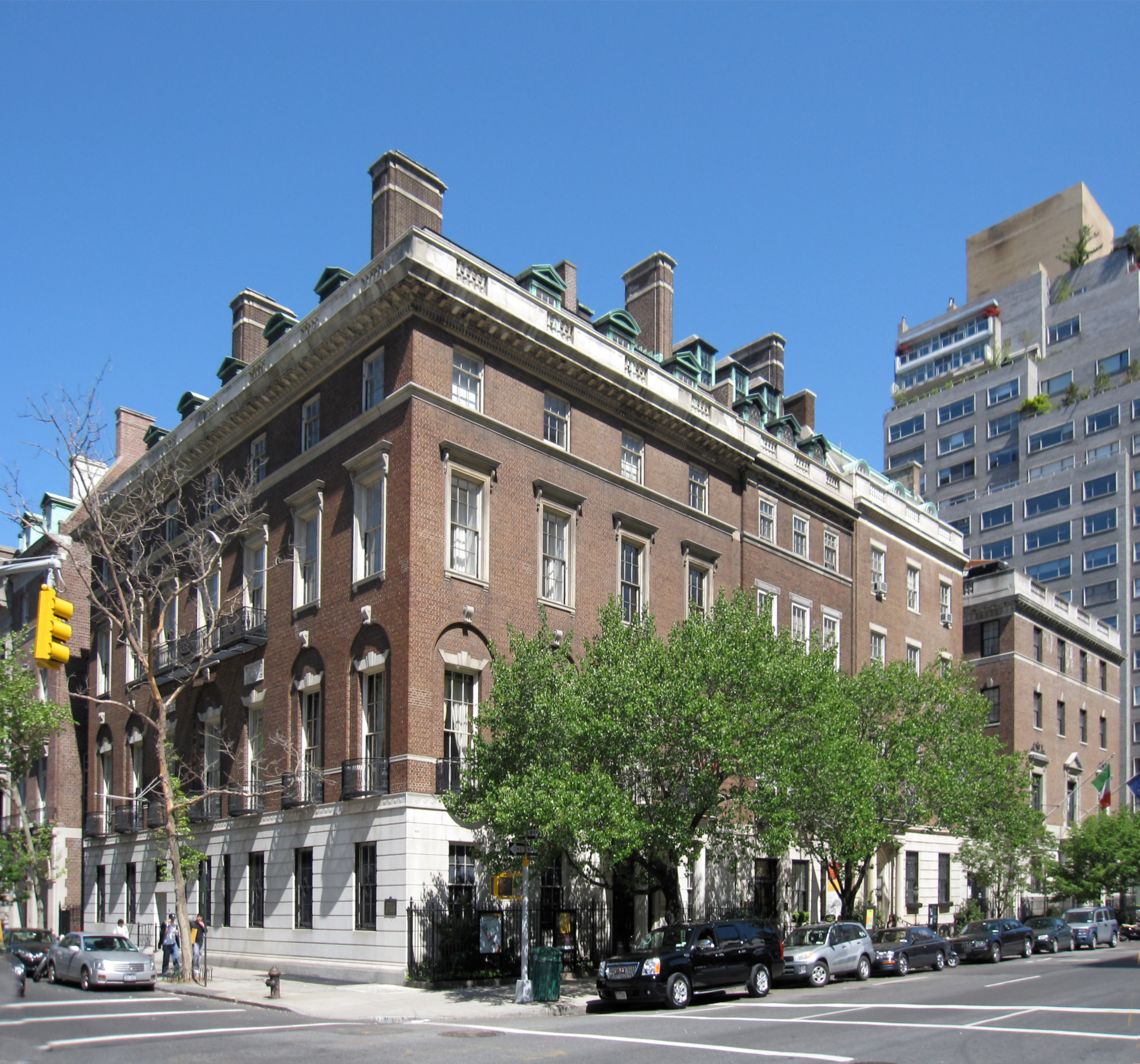
Percy R. Pyne House the first headquarters from 1948-1964.

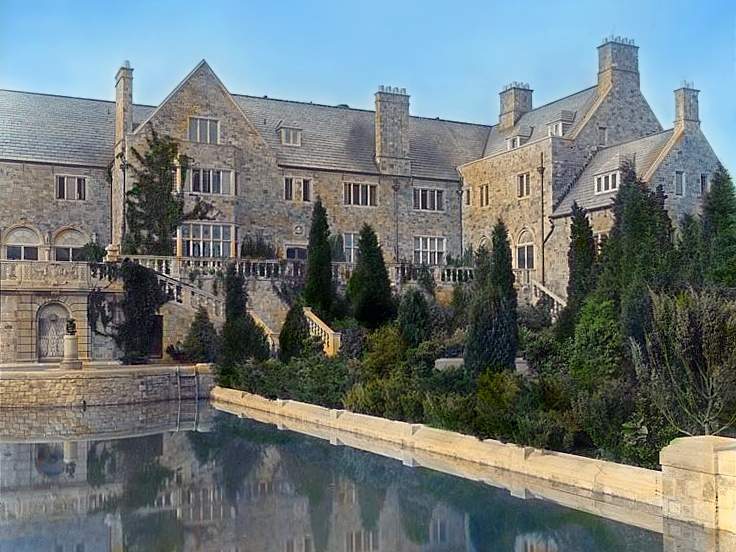
Killenworth Estate in Glen Cove purchased by the Soviet Union in 1946.

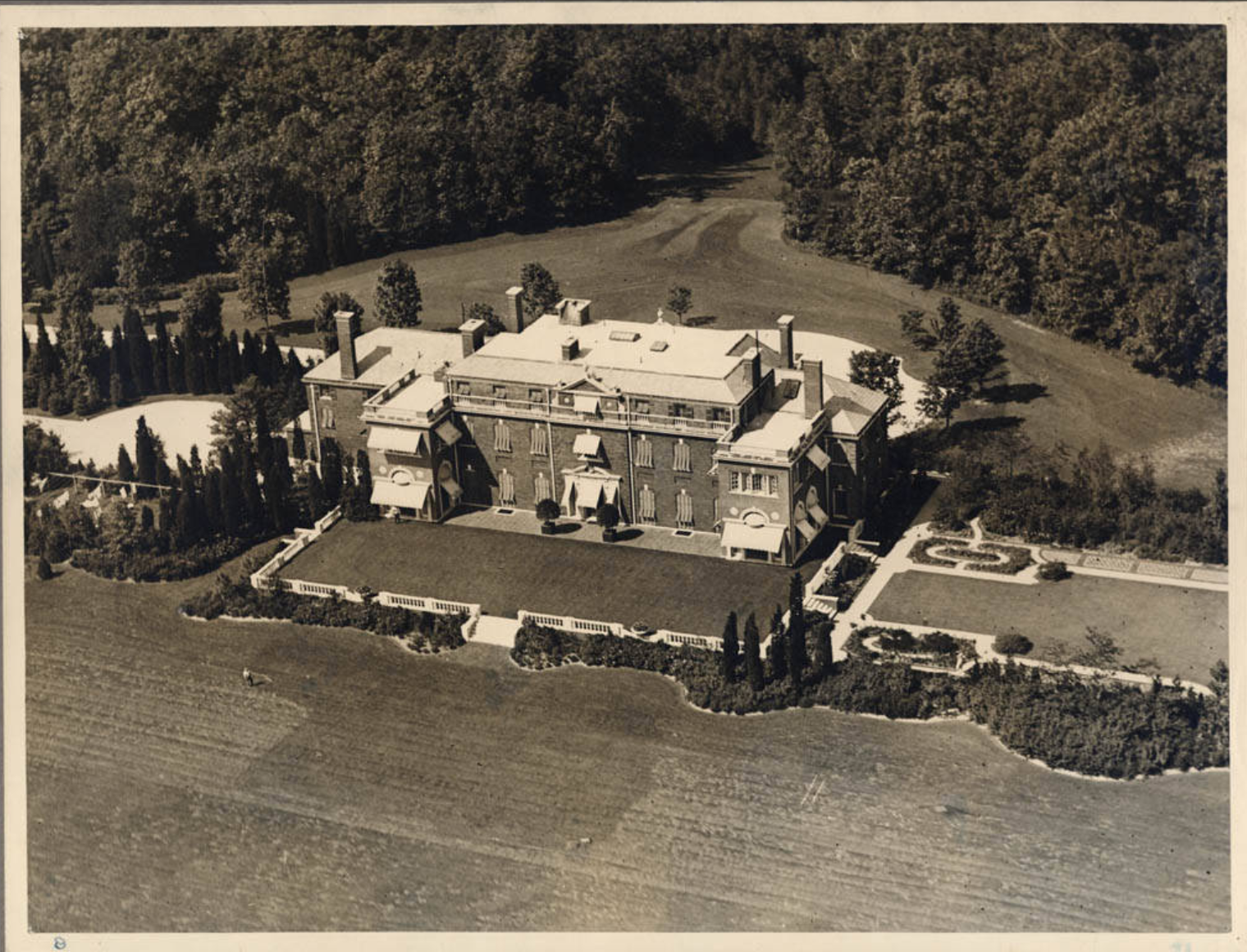
Elmcroft Estate purchased by the Soviet Union in 1952.

== See also ==
- Russia and the United Nations
- Soviet Union and the United Nations
- Permanent Representative of Russia to the United Nations
- Consulate General of Russia, New York City
- Embassy of Russia, Washington, D.C.
- List of diplomatic missions of Russia
- List of ambassadors of Russia to the United States
- Russian Ministry of Foreign Affairs
- Russia–United States relations
- Soviet Union–United States relations
- Russian Mission Residency
- Russian Mission School in New York
- Amtorg
