= Pokrovsky Hills =

Gated community in Moscow

Pokrovsky Hills Покровские Холмы
- Gated community
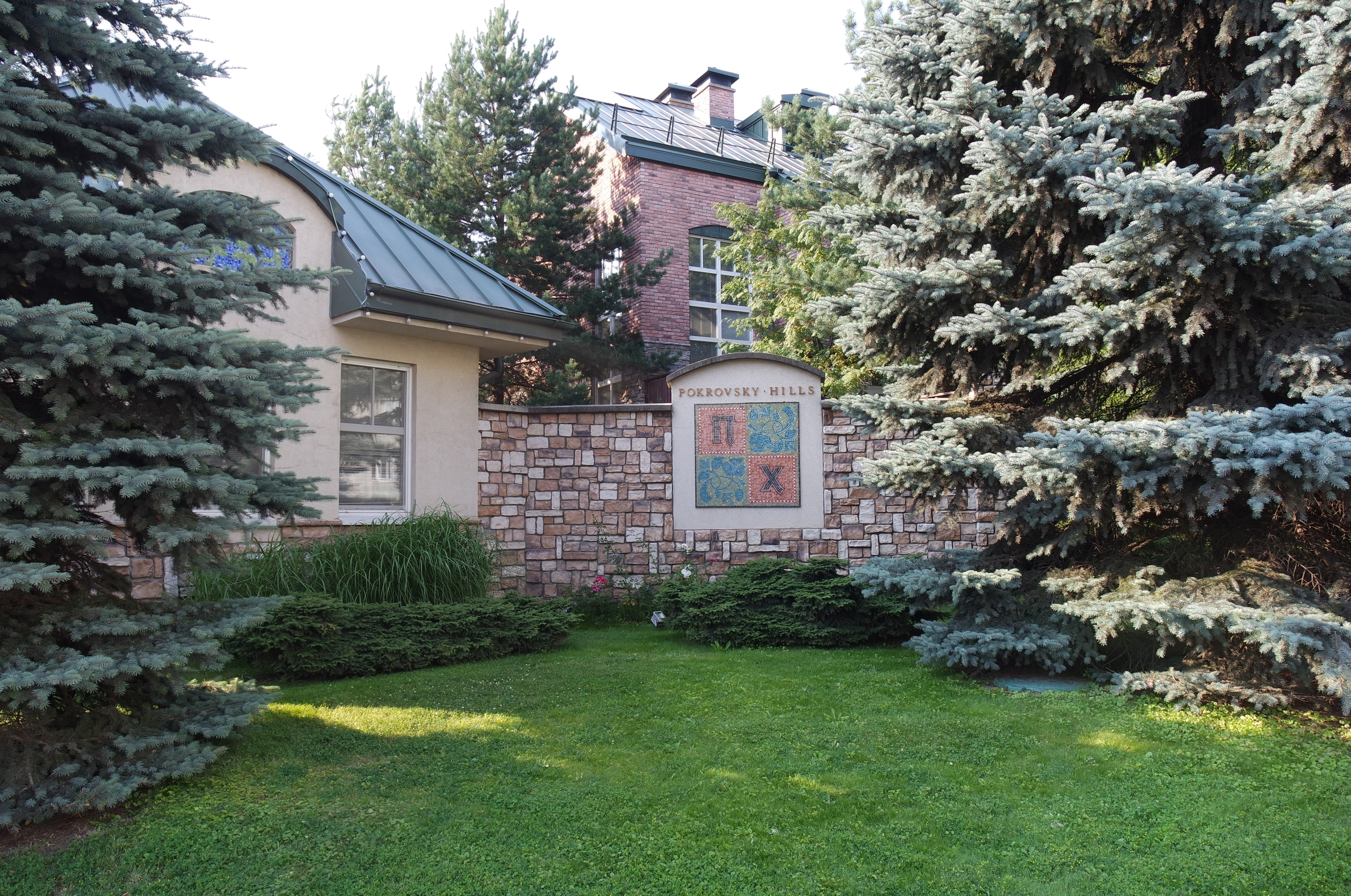
- Entrance

- Location in Moscow
- Coordinates: 55.828504°N 37.464345°E
- Country: Russia
- City: Moscow

Pokrovsky Hills (Russian: Покровские Холмы) is a gated community in the north-west part of Moscow, Russia. The residential community consists of 100 townhouses (after the first part of construction, total is planned to be 260). The neighborhood's population mostly consists of foreigners as it is adjacent to the Anglo-American School of Moscow. Pokrovsky Hills is situated in a hilly and wooded area with narrow streets.

The nearest metro stations are Tushinskaya and Sokol.
