= Elmcroft Estate =

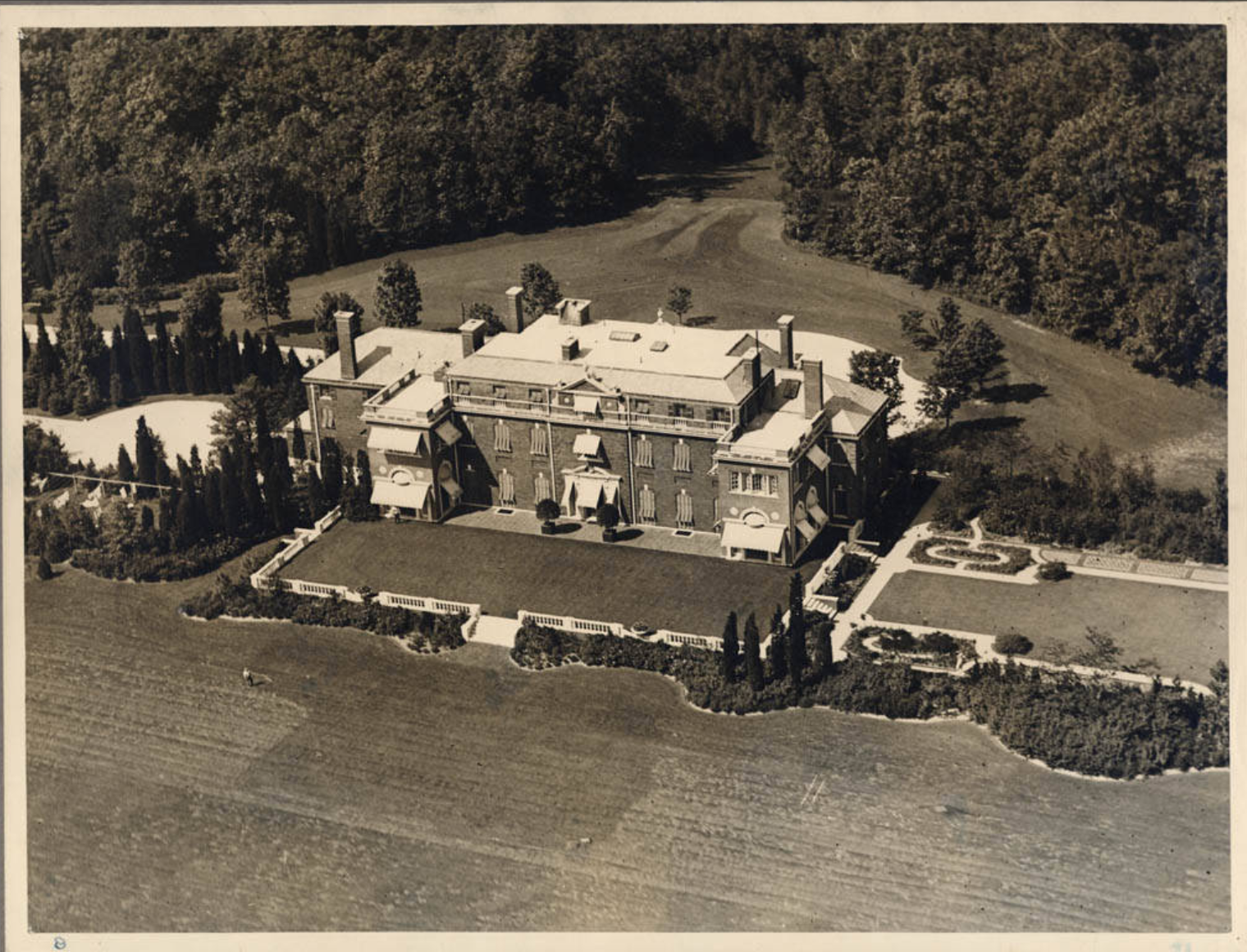
- Interactive map of the Elmcroft Estate area

General information
- Architectural style: Georgian
- Location: Mill River Road, Upper Brookville, Oyster Bay, Nassau Co., New York, United States
- Coordinates: 40°51′01″N 73°33′01″W
- Year built: 1917-1920

The Elmcroft Estate, also called the Norwich House, is a historic 14.06-acre estate in Upper Brookville, New York, U.S.

== History ==
The three-story, Georgian-style mansion was built by Little & Brown between 1917 and 1920 for industrialist Frank C.B. Page, president of E. W. Bliss Company, and his wife Henrietta Jackson. When completed it covered 18,929 square feet and had 38 rooms—11 of which were bathrooms. The estate also contains a stable-garage, guest cottage, and superintendent cottage. Landscaping was designed by A. Chandler Manning, Esq. and done by Lewis & Valentine Company.

From 1938 it was the residence of Nathan L. Miller, who served as the governor of New York from 1921 to 1922. Around 1938 Miller added an indoor swimming pool to the residence. From 1945 onwards Miller was not occupying the estate, leading to a real estate firm purchasing the estate.

On September 18, 1952, the estate was purchased for $80,000 by the Soviet Union as a country retreat for members of their UN mission, with title of the property made out to Jacob A. Malik.

On December 30, 2016, Russian access to the site was curtailed in the wake of the alleged Russian interference in the 2016 United States elections as part of a number of sanctions taken by the United States government against Russian diplomatic personnel.

As of early 2025 the US and Russian governments are in talks to opening the estate again.

== Events ==
In 1964, cosmonaut Yuri Gagarin—the first person in space—planted a birch tree on the estate.

== Gallery ==
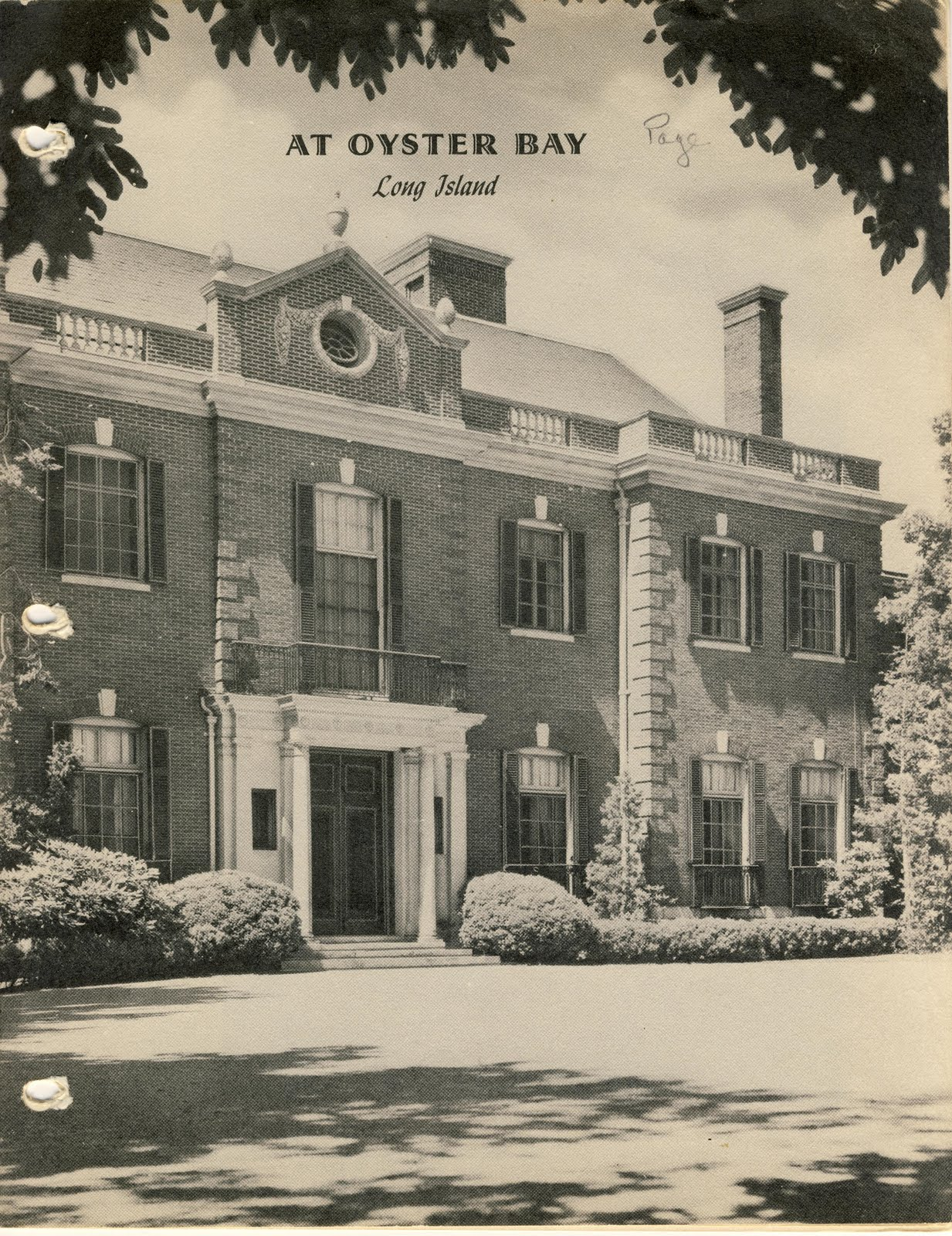
Entrance court

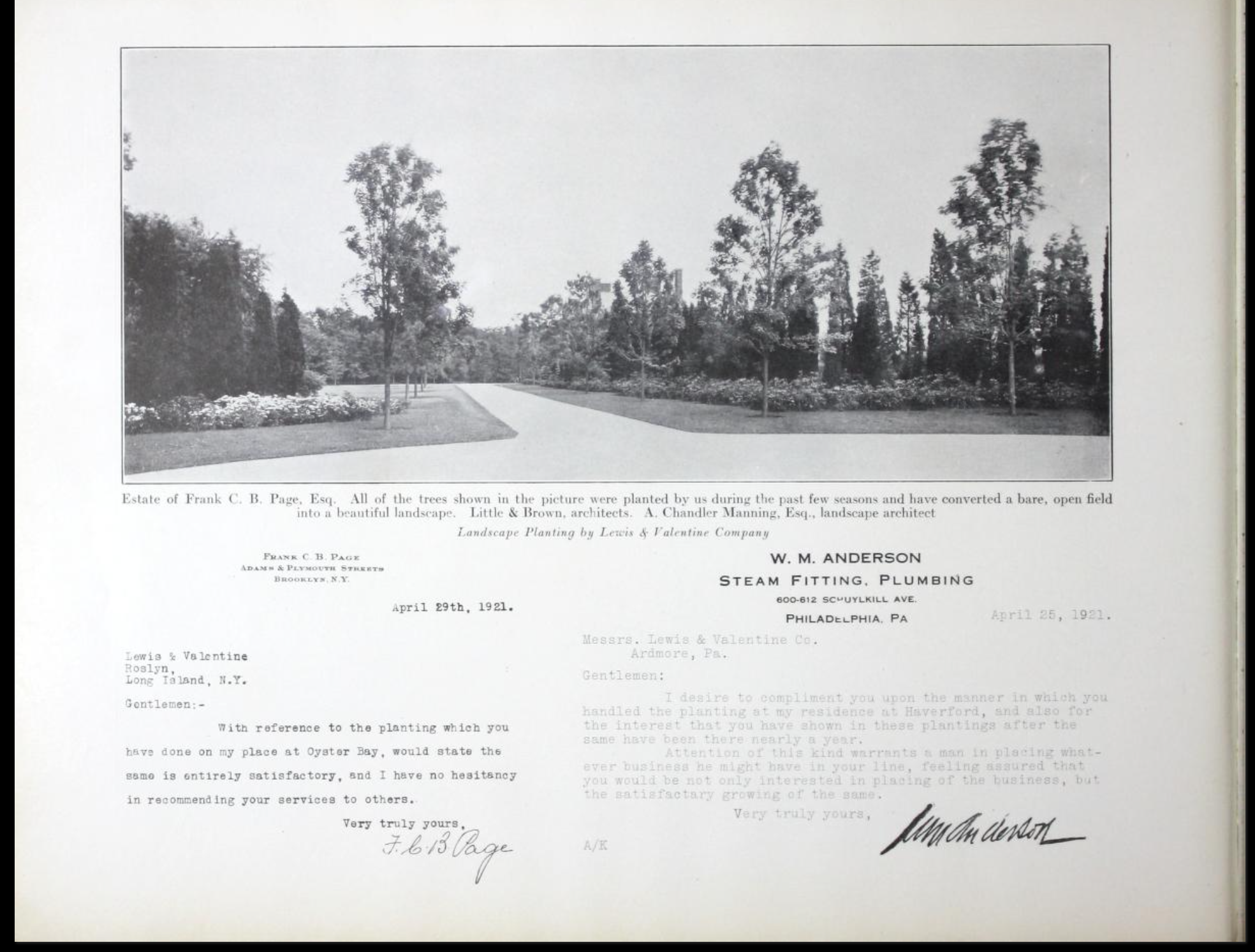
Landscaping from April 1921

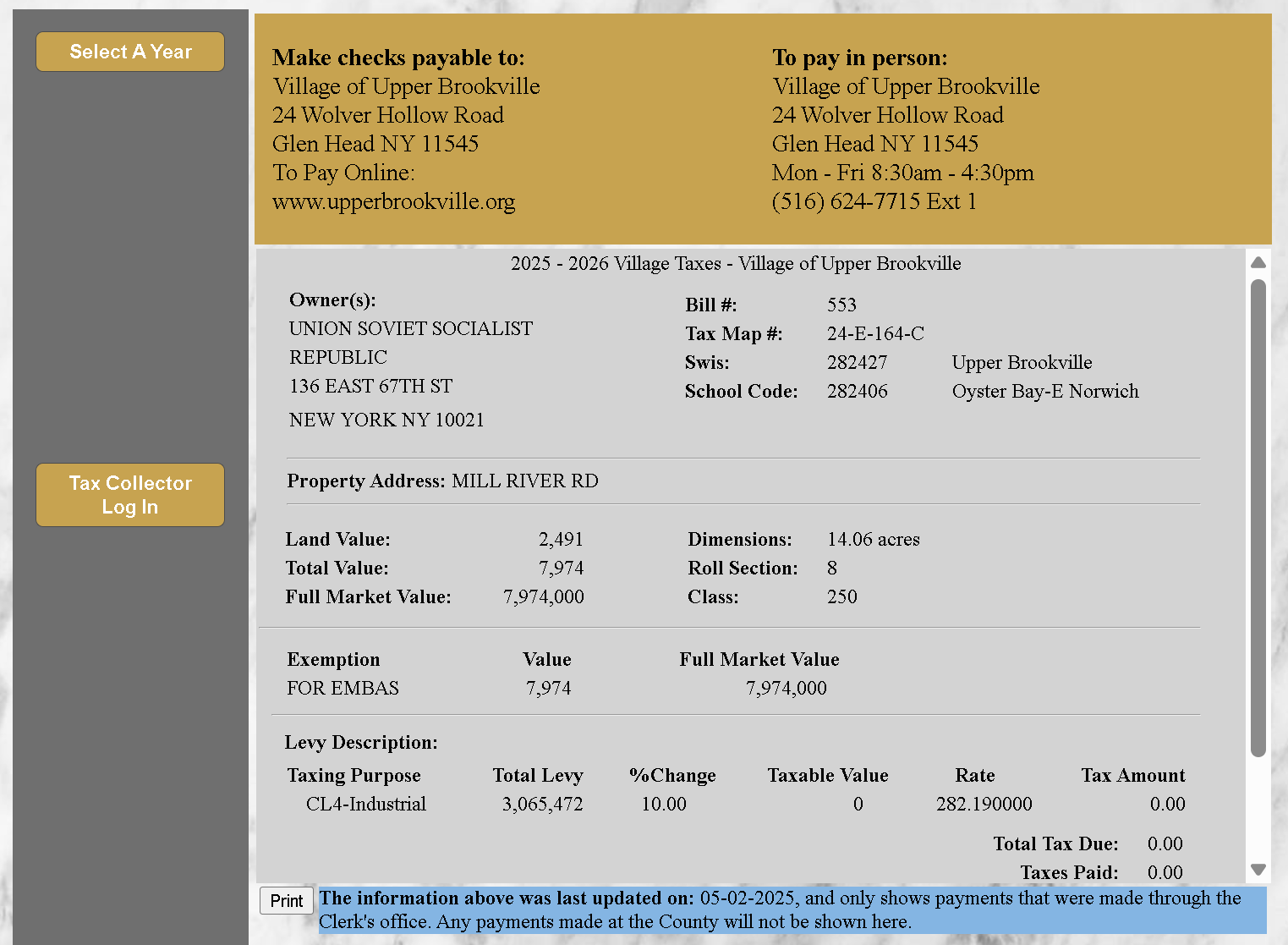
Russia's ownership of estate

== See also ==
- Permanent Mission of Russia to the United Nations
- List of diplomatic missions of Russia
- List of ambassadors of Russia to the United States
- Killenworth
- Pioneer Point, Maryland
