= Russia and the United Nations =

Russian Federation

United Nations membership
- Represented by: Union of Soviet Socialist Republics (1945–1991); Russian Federation (1991–present)
- Membership: Full member
- Since: 24 October 1945
- UNSC seat: Permanent
- Permanent Representative: Vasily Nebenzya

The Declaration of the Twelve (Belgium, Denmark, France, Germany, Greece, Ireland, Italy, Luxembourg, Portugal, Spain, the Netherlands and the United Kingdom) on the future status of Russia and other former Soviet Republics as published on 23 December 1991.

The Russian Federation continued (see Succession, continuity and legacy of the Soviet Union) to use the Soviet Union's seat, including its permanent membership on the Security Council in the United Nations after the 1991 dissolution of the Soviet Union, which had co-founded the UN in 1945. The continuity was supported by the USSR's former members and was not objected to by the UN membership; Russia accounted for more than 75% of the Soviet Union's economy, the majority of its population and 75% of its land mass; in addition, the history of the Soviet Union began in Russia with the October Revolution in 1917 in Petrograd. If there was to be a continuator to the Soviet seat on the Security Council among the former Soviet republics, these factors made Russia seem a logical choice.

== History ==
Chapter V, Article 23 of the UN Charter, adopted in 1945, provides that "The Security Council should consist of fifteen Members of the United Nations. The Republic of China, The French Republic, the Union of Soviet Socialist Republics, the United Kingdom of Great Britain and Northern Ireland, and the United States of America shall be permanent members of the Security Council."

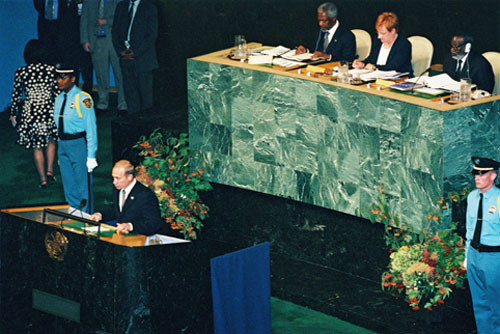
Vladimir Putin at the Millennium Summit of the UN in September 2000.

The USSR collapsed in late 1991. Eleven of the twelve members of the Commonwealth of Independent States signed a declaration on December 21, 1991, agreeing that "Member states of the Commonwealth support Russia in taking over the USSR membership in the UN, including permanent membership in the Security Council." One day before the resignation of President Mikhail Gorbachev, Soviet Ambassador Y. Vorontsov transmitted to the UN Secretary-General Javier Pérez de Cuéllar a letter from President of the Russian SFSR Boris Yeltsin stating that:

the membership of the Union of Soviet Socialist Republics in the United Nations, including the Security Council and all other organs and organizations of the United Nations system, is being continued by the Russian Federation (Russian SFSR) with the support of the countries of the Commonwealth of Independent States. In this connection, I request that the name 'Russian Federation' should be used in the United Nations in place of the name 'the Union of Soviet Socialist Republics'. The Russian Federation maintains full responsibility for all the rights and obligations of the USSR under the Charter of the United Nations, including the financial obligations. I request that you consider this letter as confirmation of the credentials to represent the Russian Federation in United Nations organs for all the persons currently holding the credentials of representatives of the USSR to the United Nations.

The Secretary-General circulated the request among the UN membership. With no objections and unanimous support, the Russian Federation took the USSR's place, with Boris Yeltsin personally taking the RF's seat at the January 31, 1992 Security Council meeting.

The Russian SFSR within the Soviet Union in 1956–1991

== Legality ==
The legality of the succession has been questioned by international lawyer Yehuda Zvi Blum, who opined that "with the demise of the Soviet Union itself, its membership in the UN should have automatically lapsed and Russia should have been admitted to membership in the same way as the other newly-independent republics (except for Belarus and Ukraine)." The elimination of Soviet (and subsequently Russian) membership on the UN Security Council would have created a constitutional crisis for the UN, which may be why the UN Secretary-General and members did not object. This situation could have been avoided had all the other nations but Russia seceded from the USSR, allowing the USSR to continue existing as a legal entity.

A mere change of name by itself, from the USSR to the Russian Federation, would not have barred Russia from succeeding the USSR. Zaire changed its name to the Democratic Republic of the Congo, and retained its UN seat. A change in the USSR's system of government likewise would not have prevented the succession; Egypt and many other countries have made a transition from monarchy to republic without jeopardizing their positions in international organizations. However, Blum argues that a key difference between these situations is that the Soviet Union was terminated as a legal entity. The 11 former member nations that supported the transfer of the seat to Russia also declared that "with the formation of the Commonwealth of Independent States, the Union of the Soviet Socialist Republics ceases to exist." The poorly defined rules on state succession make the legal situation murky.

Professor Rein Mullerson concluded that the succession was legitimate, identifying three reasons: "Firstly, after the dissolution, Russia is [sic] still remains one of the largest States in the world geographically and demographically. Secondly, Soviet Russia after 1917 and especially the Soviet Union after 1922 were treated as continuing the same State as existed under the Russian Empire. These are objective factors to show that Russia is the continuation of the Soviet Union. The third reason which forms the subjective factor is the State’s behaviour and the recognition of the continuity by the third States."

The Vienna Convention on Succession of States in respect of Treaties was not a factor in the succession because it did not enter into force until 1996.

=== Precedent for Scottish and Irish independence ===
Professor Andrew MacLeod of Kings College argues that the Russian example could be a precedent for hypothetical independence developments in the United Kingdom. Should Scotland, Northern Ireland, or both choose to leave the country, he argues, this would dissolve the Acts of Union and the Act of Settlement, and hence the United Kingdom of Great Britain and Northern Ireland would no longer exist. The question would then be how the reinstated Kingdom of England could claim to be the continuing state for UN and Security Council membership.

However, this view would probably be inconsistent with specific legislation passed by the Parliament, and does not take into account the fact that the Treaty of Union of 1706 has been, since then, well incorporated into the British legal system, and hence a Scottish independence would not bring an abrogation of the treaty and a termination of the United Kingdom, but rather only a reduction in its size—as happened with Irish independence in 1922.

== Effect on the United Nations ==
The transition led to increased debate on the relevance of the 1945 system of a Security Council dominated by five permanent members to the present world situation. Russians abroad note that Russia is "only half the size of the former Soviet economy"; the transition thus marked a significant change in the entity exercising this permanent seat. Mohamed Sid-Ahmed noted that "one of the five powers enjoying veto prerogatives in the Security Council has undergone a fundamental identity change. When the Soviet Union became Russia, its status changed from that of a superpower at the head of the communist camp to that of a society aspiring to become part of the capitalist world. Russia's permanent membership in the Security Council is no longer taken for granted. The global ideological struggle that had for so long dominated the international scene is no more, and the new realities have to be translated into a different set of global institutions." The years following the breakup of the Soviet Union have seen a dramatic increase in the number of proposals for Security Council reform. In 2005, Kofi Annan's report In Larger Freedom proposed finalizing arrangements to add more permanent seats as soon as possible. Campaigns to abolish the veto have also gained support, although their adoption is unlikely in the near future, since it would require the consent of the Permanent Five.

Global Policy Forum has on file several statements from the Permanent Five, giving arguments for why the current system should be maintained. Russia, for instance, states the veto is necessary for "balanced and sustainable decisions". Nonetheless, Russia has utilised its veto on matters pertaining to conflicts it is directly involved in, as other permanent members have done.

== Fallout over the Russian invasion of Ukraine ==
After the full-scale Russian invasion of Ukraine, Ukrainian ambassador to the UN Sergiy Kyslytsya and some members of the United States Congress have called for the suspension or expulsion of Russia from the United Nations and its organs and removing its veto power, which violated Article 6 of the Charter. Such a move would require an amendment of Article 23 of the UN Charter to remove Russia's membership as a permanent member of the Security Council. The legality of such a move has been disputed.

The invasion prompted the UN General Assembly to hold the eleventh emergency special session of the United Nations General Assembly on 2 March 2022, which adopted a resolution condemning Russia's invasion of Ukraine, demanded a full withdrawal of Russian forces and a reversal of its decision to recognise the self-declared People's Republics of Donetsk and Luhansk. The tenth paragraph of the UNGA Resolution of 2 March 2022 confirmed the involvement of Belarus in unlawful use of force against Ukraine. The resolution was sponsored by 96 countries, and passed with 141 voting in favour, 5 against, and 35 abstentions.

== See also ==
- Soviet Union and the United Nations
- Permanent Mission of Russia to the United Nations
- Permanent Representative of Russia to the United Nations
- Succession of states
