= Soviet Union and the United Nations =

Union of Soviet Socialist Republics

United Nations membership
- Membership: Former full member
- Dates: 24 October 1945 – 24 December 1991
- UNSC seat: Permanent
- Permanent Representative: Andrei Gromyko (1946–48); Yakov Malik (1948–52); Valerian Zorin (1952–53); Andrey Vyshinsky (1953–54); Arkady Sobolev (1955–60); Valerian Zorin (1960–63); Nikolai Fedorenko (1963–68); Yakov Malik (1968–76); Oleg Troyanovsky (1976–86); Yuri Dubinin (1986); Alexander Belonogov (1986–90); Yuli Vorontsov (1990–91)

The Soviet Union was a charter member of the United Nations and one of five permanent members of the Security Council. Following the dissolution of the Soviet Union in 1991, its UN seat was transferred to the Russian Federation, the continuator state of the USSR (see Succession, continuity and legacy of the Soviet Union).

== Role in the founding of the United Nations ==
The Soviet Union took an active role in the United Nations and other major international and regional organizations. At the behest of the United States, the Soviet Union took a role in the establishment of the United Nations in 1945. Soviet general secretary Joseph Stalin was initially hesitant to join the group, although Soviet delegates helped create the structure of the United Nations at the Tehran Conference and the Dumbarton Oaks Conference. US president Franklin D. Roosevelt actively worked to convince Stalin to join the UN.

At the Dumbarton Oaks Conference, the Soviet Union initially demanded that even procedural matters in the Security Council could be vetoed, meaning that the veto could block a topic from even being discussed or debated. At the Yalta Conference, the Soviet Union agreed that the veto would not apply to procedural matters.

There was initially a Western majority in the United Nations immediately after its creation. With the decolonization process, however, and as all newly independent states were accepted into the United Nations, many countries allied with the Soviet Union, as well as non-aligned countries, joined the organization.

The Ukrainian SSR (red) and Byelorussian SSR (green) within the Soviet Union in 1956–1991

The Russian SFSR (red) within the Soviet Union in 1956–1991

The USSR initially protested the membership of the Philippines and British India, whose independence was then largely theoretical. A demand by the Soviet Union that all then fifteen Soviet republics (Note: including the Karelo-Finnish SSR (1940–1956) and excluding the Russian SFSR.) be recognized as member states in the UN was counter-demanded by the United States that all then 48 US states be similarly recognized. Ultimately, at the Yalta Conference a compromise was made in which two Soviet republics (Ukrainian SSR and Byelorussian SSR) were admitted as full members of the United Nations. As such, between 1945 and 1991, the Soviet Union was represented by three seats in the United Nations. This was supported by British Foreign Minister Anthony Eden so that, in return, British India would have its own seat in the United Nations, as it had in the League of Nations before it. Roosevelt agreed at Eden's insistence, despite the US State Department's objection.

The Journal of Cold War Studies contends that the Soviet Union dropped its demand for a veto on procedural matters in exchange for the two extra seats.

== Security Council and veto ==
The Soviet Union had cast its veto 109 times by 1973, out of a total 128 vetoes used by the council. For 75% of the vetoes cast by the Soviet Union, further actions were taken by United Nations.

The Russians believed strongly in the veto power, and insisted it be part of the United Nations Security Council. They voiced this option for the veto power to both the Security Council and the General Assembly. The Soviet representative to the United Nations in 1950, Andrei Y. Vishinsky, declared that "the veto power is the paramount principle, which constitutes the cornerstone of the United Nations."

== Relationship with China ==
The debate over China's representation with the United Nations began in 1949. The Chinese Communist Party took over the country's mainland in the Chinese Civil War, while the Nationalists retreated to the island of Taiwan, which it had received from Japan following its surrender in 1945. The United Nations seat of China was held by the Nationalist government of the Republic of China and conflict quickly arose over which government should hold the China seat. The Soviet Union supported the Communist government of mainland China, leading to conflict with the West. The Security Council sided with the United States and deemed the Communist government of People's Republic of China (PRC) to be illegitimate and denied their delegation from entering the United Nations until 1971 when China's seat was transferred to the Communist government of PRC.

A major turning point in the Soviet Union relation occurred in January 1950, when Soviet representatives boycotted United Nations functions in protest over the occupation of the seat of China by the Republic of China. Yakov Malik was the sole Soviet representative that walked out of the United Nations, and announced that they would be boycotting further Security Council meetings. In the absence of the Soviet representatives, the United Nations Security Council was able to vote for the intervention of United Nations military forces in what would become the Korean War. This was a downside to the boycott that was unforeseeable to the Soviet Union at the time.

Nations questioned Soviet actions on relations with China, and how they acted on the issue of representation. The Soviet Union always voted for China's Communist Party to have the seat.

== Relationship with the West ==
For many years, the West played a guiding role in United Nations deliberations, but by the 1960s many former colonies had been granted independence and had joined the United Nations. These states, which became the majority in the General Assembly and other bodies, were increasingly receptive to Soviet anti-imperialist appeals. By the 1970s, the United Nations deliberations had generally become increasingly hostile toward the West and toward the United States in particular, as evidenced by pro-Soviet and anti-American voting trends in the General Assembly.

Western media reported in 1987 that Eastern European and Asian communist countries that were allies or satellite states of the Soviet Union, had received more development assistance from the United Nations than what the Soviet Union had contributed. This contradicted communist states' rhetorical support for the United Nations' establishment of a New International Economic Order, which would transfer wealth from the rich Northern Hemisphere to the poor Southern Hemisphere states. The Soviet Union announced in September 1987 that it would pay back a portion of its debt to the United Nations.

The Soviet Union did not, however, win support in the United Nations for its foreign policy positions. The Soviet Union and Third World states often argued that imperialism caused and continued to maintain the disparities in the world distribution of wealth. They disagreed, however, on the proper level of Soviet aid to the Third World. Also, the Soviet Union encountered fierce opposition to its invasion and occupation of Afghanistan and the Vietnamese occupation of Cambodia and received little support (as evidenced by Third World abstentions) for its 1987 proposal on the creation of a "Comprehensive System of International Peace and Security."

== Participation in special agencies ==
After walking out of the United Nations in January 1950, the Soviet Union returned to various United Nations bodies in August 1950. The return brought with it a beginning of a new policy of active participation on international and regional organizations. By the late 1980s the Soviet Union belonged to most of the special agencies of the United Nations. They did, however, resist joining various agricultural, food and humanitarian relief efforts.

During the Mikhail Gorbachev era, the Soviet Union made repeated suggestions for increasing United Nations involvement in the settlement of superpower and regional problems and conflicts. Though these proposals were not implemented, they constituted new initiatives in Soviet foreign policy and represented a break with the nature of past Soviet foreign policy. This lessened world tensions.

== Dissolution and succession by Russia ==
The Declaration of the Twelve (Belgium, Denmark, France, Germany, Greece, Ireland, Italy, Luxembourg, Portugal, Spain, the Netherlands and the United Kingdom) on the future status of Russia and other former Soviet Republics was published on 23 December 1991, according to which "The European Community and its Member States have noted with satisfaction the decision of the participants at the Alma Ata meeting on 21 December 1991 to establish a Commonwealth of Independent States. They note that the international rights and obligations of the former USSR, including those arising from the Charter of the United Nations, will continue to be exercised by Russia. They note with satisfaction the acceptance by the Russian Government of these commitments and responsibilities and will continue to deal with Russia on this basis, taking into account the change in its constitutional status. They are prepared to recognise the other Republics constituting the Community as soon as they receive assurances from those Republics that they are prepared to fulfil the requirements set out in the "Guidelines on the Recognition of New States in Eastern Europe and the Soviet Union", adopted by Ministers on 16 December 1991. They expect, in particular, that those Republics will give them assurances that they will fulfil their international obligations arising from treaties and agreements concluded by the Soviet Union, including the ratification and implementation of the CFE Treaty by the Republics to which it applies, and that they will establish a single control over nuclear weapons and their non-proliferation."

In the wake of the collapse of the Soviet Union, 11 Soviet republics—all except the Baltic states and Georgia—signed the Alma-Ata Protocol on 21 December 1991, establishing the Commonwealth of Independent States and declaring that the Soviet Union had ceased to exist. The Protocol provided that the Russian Federation would assume Soviet Union's United Nation membership, including its permanent seat on the United Nations Security Council. The resignation of Soviet president Gorbachev on 25 December 1991 and the dissolution of the Soviet of the Republics the following day formalized the end of the Soviet Union.

On 24 December 1991, the Soviet permanent representative to the United Nations Yuli Vorontsov delivered to the Secretary-General of the United Nations a letter from the Russian president Boris Yeltsin. The letter stated that the Soviet Union had ceased to exist, and that Russia would continue the Soviet Union's membership in the United Nations and maintain the full responsibility for all the rights and obligations of the Soviet Union under the United Nations Charter. The letter was circulated among the United Nations membership without any objection, and Russia formally took over the Soviet Union's seat in the United Nations General Assembly, in the Security Council and in other organs of the United Nations. The letter also confirmed the credentials of Soviet representatives to represent Russia, and Soviet representatives to the various United Nations agencies continued serving as Russian representatives without presenting new credentials. Ambassador Vorontsov continued serving as the first Permanent Representative of the Russian Federation to the United Nations.

On 31 January 1992, Russian president Boris Yeltsin himself was in the Russian Federation's seat in the Security Council during the 'summit meeting' of the Council attended by heads of state and government.

== See also ==
- Russia and the United Nations
- Permanent Mission of Russia to the United Nations
- Permanent Representative of Russia to the United Nations
- Ukraine and the United Nations
- Armenia and the United Nations
- Azerbaijan and the United Nations
- Kazakhstan and the United Nations
