= Russian Mission Residency =

Building in the Bronx, New York

Russian Mission Residency in New York
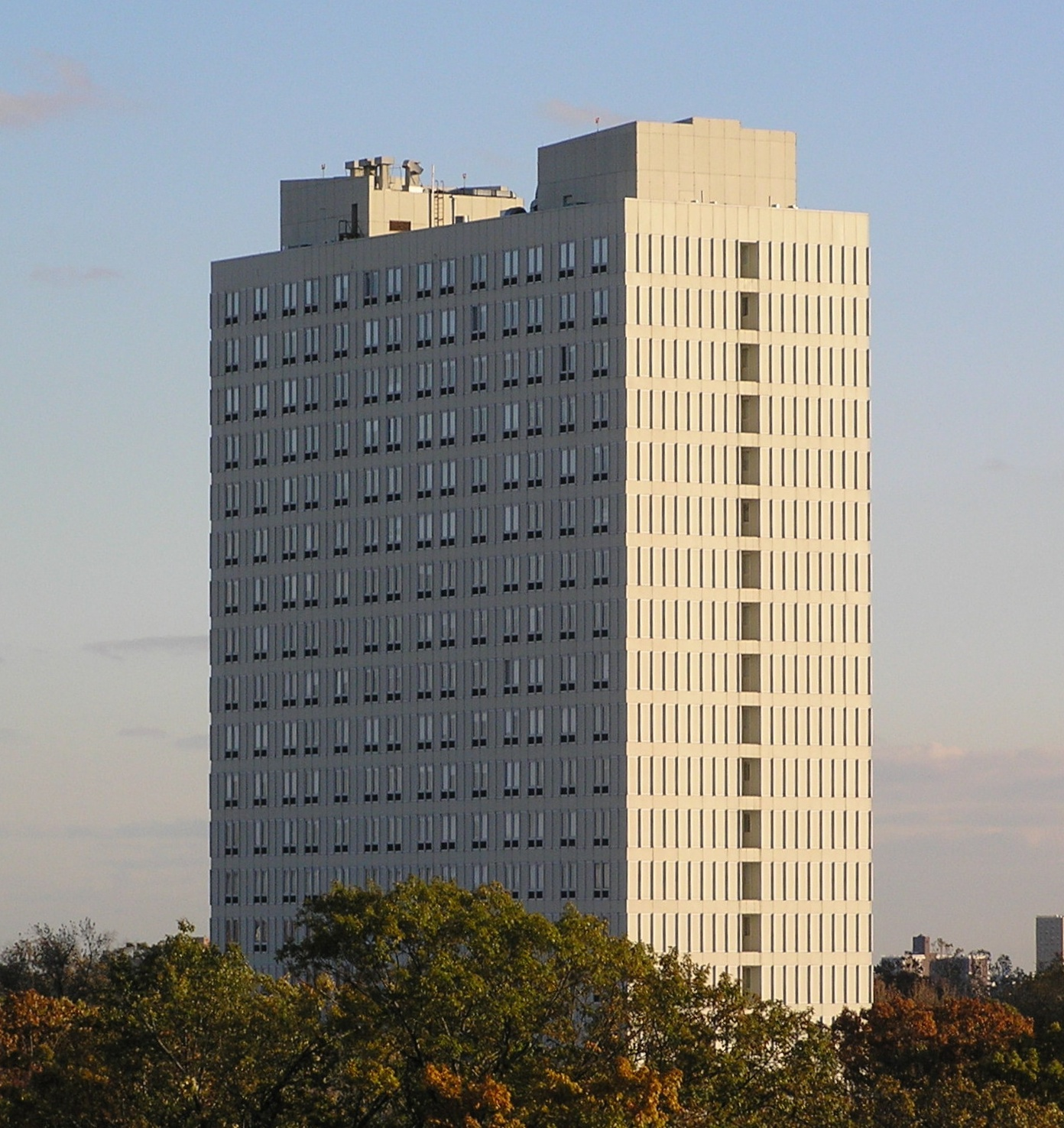

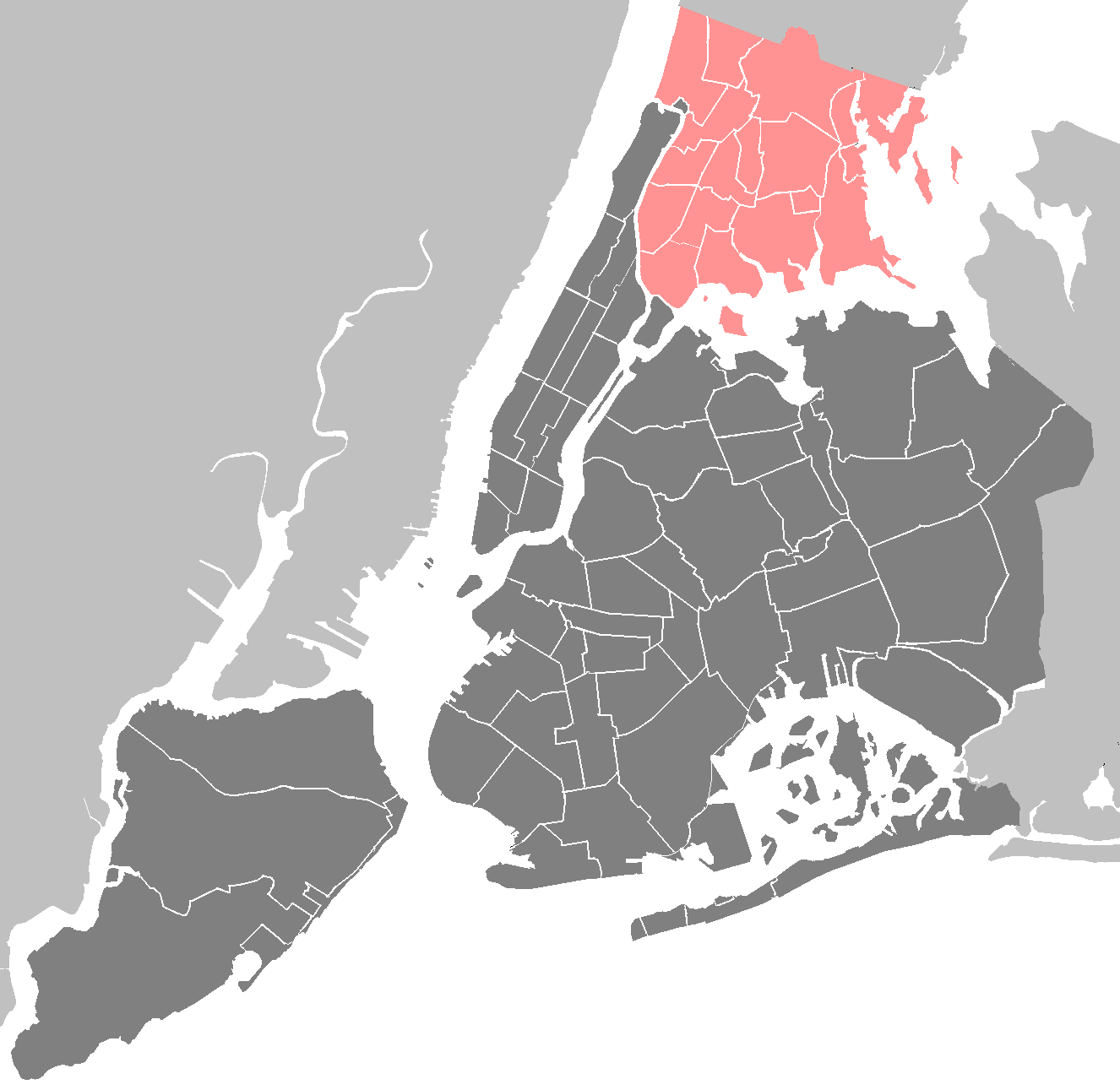
- Location within Bronx Location within New York City Location within New York Location within the United States

General information
- Location: 355 West 255th Street; Bronx, NY 10471
- Coordinates: 40.902997°N 73.902718°W

The Russian Mission Residency in New York is the residence for diplomatic workers of the Russian Federation's Ministry of Foreign Affairs. It is located in the Riverdale community of the Bronx, a borough of New York City, New York. It is affiliated with the Permanent Mission of Russia to the United Nations, and is operated by the Russian Ministry of Foreign Affairs.

== History ==
The land the residence was built on had previously been owned by Robert Weinberg. In 1967 Weinberg wanted to build 18‐story 340 unit apartment building for middle class and low-income tenants at the location, part of Mayor John Lindsay's “scatter-site” public housing plan. However this never occurred due to affluent neighbors protesting the plan. The land remained vacant until December 1971 when it was purchased by the Soviet Union for $900,000.

Architectural firm Pomerance & Breines was initially approached to design the new Russian Mission Residency. After the firm's plans were approved by the Soviets, bidding from construction companies to build the plans started. But due to high bidding costs from construction companies, with the lowest bid being around $9 million, the plans were dropped.

In the spring of 1972, California based International Environmental Dynamics was approached because of their patent on a suspended‐steel‐floor top‐down building system that they had designed to protect against earthquakes. Their system had been used in construction of a Holiday Inn motel in Huntington, West Virginia, two buildings in Nevada, and six California office buildings. Their system was approved by the Soviets and the company selected Skidmore, Owings & Merrill to be the architects. Tishman Construction, Inc. was selected as the construction company, with construction cost at approximately $8 million, which was $1 million less than the previous construction bids made for Pomerance & Breines' plans.

In 1974 the 20-story Russian Mission Residency was built using International Environmental Dynamics' top-down construction method. The prefabricated floors would be hoisted up, starting with 20th floor first and moving down to 1st floor last. Sixteen floors are for 240 apartments for housing Russian residents, and the lowest three floors have a school, an auditorium, a gymnasium, a playground, a theater, a barber shop, stores, and an underground garage able to hold 100 cars.

Towards the end of April 1975 Ambassador Yakov Malik called the project the “first child of the cooperation between the USSR and the U.S.”

After Mikhail Gorbachev and Ronald Reagan signed a cultural agreement on November 21, 1985, different forms of cultural exchanges have occurred at the residence including Russian students from the residency's school meeting with local American high school students, and musical concerts.

== See also ==
- Permanent Mission of Russia to the United Nations
- Permanent Representative of Russia to the United Nations
- Consulate General of Russia, New York City
- List of diplomatic missions of Russia
- List of ambassadors of Russia to the United States
- Russian Ministry of Foreign Affairs
- Russian Mission School in New York
