= Succession, continuity, and legacy of the Soviet Union =

The Soviet Union, officially the Union of Soviet Socialist Republics (USSR), was a transcontinental country that spanned much of Eurasia from 1922 to 1991. It was a founding member of the United Nations in 1945, as well as a permanent member of the United Nations Security Council. Following the dissolution of the USSR in 1991, its seat at the United Nations was transferred to the Russian Federation, which is its continuator state.

== Background ==
The Treaty on the Formation of the Union of Soviet Socialist Republics officially created the USSR. The Treaty was approved on 30 December 1922 by a conference of delegations from the Russian SFSR, the Transcaucasian SFSR, the Ukrainian SSR and the Byelorussian SSR. The Treaty and the Declaration were confirmed by the First All-Union Congress of Soviets and signed by heads of delegations – Mikhail Kalinin, Mikhail Tskhakaya, and Grigory Petrovsky, Alexander Chervyakov respectively on December 30, 1922. The treaty provided flexibility to admit new members. Therefore, by 1940 the Soviet Union grew from the founding four (or six, depending on whether 1922 or 1940 definitions are applied) republics to 15 republics.

=== Transition period and cessation of the existence of the Soviet Union ===
In the Soviet Union, the transition period was declared by adoption the Law of the USSR "On the bodies of state power and administration of the Union of Soviet Socialist Republics in the transition period" which was signed into law on 5 September 1991. It was assumed that the Soviet Union would come out of the transition period with a new name of the Union when all the treaties are signed, ratified, come into force and the new parliament assembled. However, this did not happen.

As the Kommersant newspaper wrote on 7 October 1991, a series of conflicts occurred in the RSFSR government during preparations for the signing of the Treaty on the Economic Community. In his speech to members of the Russian parliament, RSFSR State Secretary Gennady Burbulis declared Russia's special role as the legal successor to the Soviet Union. Accordingly, the ways of drafting agreements with the republics should be determined by the Russian leadership. Instead of the planned order, he suggested signing a political agreement first, followed by an economic one. The newspaper suggested that Burbulis' goal was to persuade Yeltsin not to sign the agreement as it stands at the time. Yegor Gaidar, Alexander Shokhin and Konstantin Kagalovsky were named as the developers of the statement made by Burbulis. In the same time, a group of "isolationist patriots" consisting of Mikhail Maley, Nikolai Fedorov, Alexander Shokhin, Igor Lazarev and Mikhail Poltoranin criticized Ivan Silaev and Yevgeny Saburov for wanting to preserve the Soviet Union.

On 18 October 1991, in the St. George Hall of the Grand Kremlin Palace, Mikhail Gorbachev and the leaders of eight Union republics (excluding Ukraine, Moldova, Georgia and Azerbaijan) signed the Treaty on the Economic Community as planned. Ukraine and Moldova said they would sign at a later date. This economic agreement was then to be supplemented by a similar political agreement. On 14 November in Novo-Ogaryovo, Mikhail Gorbachev and the heads of the seven union republics pre-agreed to sign a treaty on the creation of a political union called the Union of Sovereign States, which would have no constitution but would remain a subject of international law as the Soviet Union had been. The Treaty would complement the previous economic treaty and was scheduled to be signed in December.

Because of the referendum results and the actions of the Verkhovna Rada, Leonid Kravchuk refused on 7 December to sign such a political agreement that did not take Ukraine's status into account. Boris Yeltsin said that if Ukraine would not sign, then Russia would not sign either, although at this moment, besides Russia, six republics still wanted to sign the new Union treaty. The Belovezha Accords were signed on 8 December, where it was Burbulis who authored the phrase “The Union of Soviet Socialist Republics as a subject of international law and geopolitical reality ceases to exist.” The agreement declared the dissolution of the USSR by its remaining founder states (denunciation of the Treaty on the Creation of the USSR) and established the Commonwealth of Independent States (CIS). On 10 December, the accord was ratified by the Ukrainian and Belarusian parliaments. On 12 December, the agreement was ratified by the Russian Parliament, therefore the Russian SFSR renounced the Treaty on the Creation of the USSR and de facto declared Russia's independence from the USSR.

On 26 December 1991, the USSR was self-dissolved by the Council of the Republics of the Supreme Soviet of the Soviet Union, the upper house of the Supreme Soviet of the Soviet Union (the lower house, the Soviet of the Union, was without a quorum).

== General agreements ==
On 14 February 1992, the heads of state instructed the foreign ministers of the Commonwealth participating states to prepare a document on the legal succession of treaties, all property, state archives, debts and assets of the former Union of Soviet Socialist Republics.

On 20 March 1992, the CIS Council of Heads of State signed the Decision on the succession of state property, debts and assets of the former USSR.

On 15 May 1992, the CIS Council of Heads of State signed a Protocol Decision on the activities of the Commission on Succession to Treaties, of mutual interest, state property, state archives, debts and assets of the former Union of Soviet Socialist Republics.

On 6 July 1992 the CIS Council of Heads of State signed a Memorandum of Understanding on the issue of succession to treaties of the former Union of Soviet Socialist Republics that are of mutual interest. According to the text

- Almost all multilateral international treaties of the former Union of Soviet Socialist Republics are of common interest to the Commonwealth participating States. However, these treaties do not require any joint decisions or actions of the participating States of the Commonwealth. The question of participation in these treaties is decided in accordance with the principles and norms of international law by each Commonwealth participant state on its own.
- There are a number of bilateral international treaties of the former Union of Soviet Socialist Republics that affect the interests of two or more (but not all) Commonwealth participant states. These treaties require decisions or actions by those Commonwealth participating States to which the treaties apply.
- A number of bilateral treaties affect the interests of all Commonwealth participating States. These include, for example, treaties on borders and their regime. Such treaties are required by international law to remain in force, and participation is limited to those Commonwealth participating States that share a contiguous border with non-Commonwealth countries.
- If any questions arise concerning succession to treaties of the former Union of Soviet Socialist Republics, consultations will be held between the States concerned.

== International relations, treaties and organizations ==
The Declaration of the Twelve (Belgium, Denmark, France, Germany, Greece, Ireland, Italy, Luxembourg, Portugal, Spain, the Netherlands and the United Kingdom) on the future status of Russia and other former Soviet Republics was published on 23 December 1991, according to which "The European Community and its Member States have noted with satisfaction the decision of the participants at the Alma Ata meeting on 21 December 1991 to establish a Commonwealth of Independent States. They note that the international rights and obligations of the former USSR, including those arising from the Charter of the United Nations, will continue to be exercised by Russia. They note with satisfaction the acceptance by the Russian Government of these commitments and responsibilities and will continue to deal with Russia on this basis, taking into account the change in its constitutional status."

On 4 September 1991, U.S. Secretary of State James Baker articulated five basic principles that would guide U.S. policy toward the emerging republics: self-determination consistent with democratic principles, recognition of existing borders, support for democracy and rule of law, preservation of human rights and rights of national minorities, and respect for international law and obligations. The basic message was clear—if the new republics could follow these principles, they could expect cooperation and assistance from the United States. Self-determination is a cardinal principle in modern international law but no right to secession is recognized under international law.

The "Guidelines on the Recognition of New States in Eastern Europe and the Soviet Union", adopted by Ministers of the EC (Belgium, Denmark, France, Germany, Greece, Ireland, Italy, Luxembourg, Portugal, Spain, the Netherlands and the United Kingdom) on 16 December 1991. According to a scientific paper: "EC Guidelines on the Recognition of New States in Eastern Europe and the Soviet Union approved in December 1991 constituted a remarkable innovation in European policy-making."

On 21 December 1991, the Council of Heads of State decided that the member states of the Commonwealth, referring to Article 12 of the Agreement on the Establishment of the Commonwealth of Independent States, based on the intention of each state to fulfill obligations under the UN Charter and participate in the work of this organization as full members, taking into account that the original members of the UN were the Republic of Belarus, the USSR and Ukraine, expressing satisfaction that the Republic of Belarus and Ukraine continue to participate in the UN as sovereign independent states, decided that "the Commonwealth States support Russia in continuing the membership of the USSR in the UN, including permanent membership in the Security Council, and other international organizations." The document entered into force for 11 countries on December 21. On 23 December 1991 this appears in print in the New York Times: "Member states of the commonwealth support Russia in taking over the U.S.S.R. membership in the U.N., including permanent membership in the Security Council and other international organizations."

The Declaration of the Twelve on the future status of Russia and other former Soviet Republics was published on 23 December 1991, according to which "The European Community and its Member States have noted with satisfaction the decision of the participants at the Alma Ata meeting on 21 December 1991 to establish a Commonwealth of Independent States. They note that the international rights and obligations of the former USSR, including those arising from the Charter of the United Nations, will continue to be exercised by Russia. They note with satisfaction the acceptance by the Russian Government of these commitments and responsibilities and will continue to deal with Russia on this basis, taking into account the change in its constitutional status. They are prepared to recognise the other Republics constituting the Community as soon as they receive assurances from those Republics that they are prepared to fulfil the requirements set out in the "Guidelines on the Recognition of New States in Eastern Europe and the Soviet Union", adopted by Ministers on 16 December 1991. They expect, in particular, that those Republics will give them assurances that they will fulfil their international obligations arising from treaties and agreements concluded by the Soviet Union, including the ratification and implementation of the CFE Treaty by the Republics to which it applies, and that they will establish a single control over nuclear weapons and their non-proliferation."

Thus, the 12 countries (Belgium, Denmark, France, Germany, Greece, Ireland, Italy, Luxembourg, Portugal, Spain, the Netherlands and the United Kingdom) do not need to recognize Russia's independence from the Soviet Union and establish new relations with Russia as a new state, because relations have already been established with the Soviet Union, of which Russia has become the continuator in international relations. Recognition of the independence of other 11 countries (Armenia, Azerbaijan, Belarus, Georgia, Kazakhstan, Kyrgyzstan, Moldova, Tajikistan, Turkmenistan, Ukraine, Uzbekistan) occurs on the condition that they assume the obligations under the treaties signed by the Soviet Union, including respect for the provisions of the Charter of the United Nations and the commitments subscribed to in the Final Act of Helsinki and in the Charter of Paris, guarantees for the rights of ethnic and national groups and minorities, respect for the inviolability of all frontiers and acceptance of all relevant commitments with regard to disarmament and nuclear non-proliferation as well as to security and regional stability.

Marko Milanovic, Professor of Public International Law at the University of Reading School of Law noted in 2009: "The best example of continuation and separation is the Soviet Union, which continued its existence as the Russian Federation, along a number of new successor states. (Note that a continuator state is often misleadingly termed as the successor state, even though there may be a number of actual successor states alongside the continuator.) A continuator state like Russia by definition remains a party to all treaties of its predecessor, because for all intents and purposes it is the predecessor. Thus, for example, Russia continued the Soviet Union’s UN membership and its permanent seat on the Security Council."

=== UN membership ===
On 23 December Russia officially received the USSR's seat on the UN Security Council. The international community recognized it as continuator state to the Soviet Union.

On 24 December, Yeltsin sent a Letter to the Secretary-General of the United Nations from the President of the Russian Federation with the following content:

I have the honour to inform you that the membership of the Union of Soviet Socialist Republics in the United Nations, including the Security Council and all other organs and organizations of the United Nations system, is being continued by the Russian Federation (RSFSR) with the support of the countries of the Commonwealth of Independent States. In this connection, I request that the name "the Russian Federation" should be used in the United Nations in place of the name "the Union of Soviet Socialist Republics". The Russian Federation maintains full responsibility for all the rights and obligations of the USSR under the Charter of the United Nations, including the financial obligations. I request you to consider this letter as confirmation of the credentials to represent the Russian Federation in the United Nations organs for all the persons currently holding the credentials of representatives of the USSR to the United Nations.

The Gudok newspaper notes that Yeltsin's letter was sent by the secretary-general to all UN members with a note that this appeal is of a notification nature, stating reality, and does not require formal approval by the UN. All permanent members of the UN Security Council and other leading countries agreed with this approach. By a note of 3 January 1992, the Russian Foreign Ministry appealed to the heads of diplomatic missions in Moscow with a proposal to consider consular and diplomatic missions of the USSR in foreign countries as representatives of Russia. By a note of 13 January 1992, the heads of foreign diplomatic missions were notified that the Russian Federation continued to exercise the rights and fulfil the obligations arising from international treaties concluded by the USSR, with a request to consider Russia as a party to all existing international treaties instead of the USSR.

The UN website lists Russia as a member of the United Nations as follows: "The Union of Soviet Socialist Republics was an original Member of the United Nations from 24 October 1945. In a letter dated 24 December 1991, Boris Yeltsin, the President of the Russian Federation, informed the Secretary-General that the membership of the Soviet Union in the Security Council and all other United Nations organs was being continued by the Russian Federation with the support of the 11 member countries of the Commonwealth of Independent States."

In an interview with Nezavisimaya Gazeta on 1 April 1992, Foreign Minister Andrei Kozyrev explained the situation: “Many people think that Russia became the legal successor of the USSR automatically, but this is far from being the case. We faced a very difficult political and diplomatic task. Russia is not a legal successor, but a continuing state of the USSR. The successor states are in fact all the former republics of the Soviet Union, but it is Russia that is the continuator.”

More than 30 years later on 10 January 2025 Kozyrev reconfirmed that Russia is the continuator of the USSR, and all 12 countries (the Baltic states are not recognized as legal successors of the USSR) are the successors of the USSR.

There was no automaticity. It was an open question. The solution was suggested to us by Western countries, especially by the British, who had a huge experience in solving inheritance issues, they had an empire. The British dug somewhere in their archives and proposed a variant of a successor state. There is a monstrous confusion even among historians who write about it and political analysts. It is simply an unwillingness to understand. So, all of them are legal successors. All Union republics. The three Baltic republics refused to be successors. All the others, Georgia, Armenia, Kazakhstan were legal successors and now remain legal successors. In relation to foreign debt, it was a deal. With respect to the UN Security Council, an international conference of all successors under international law had to be convened to resolve the issues. Therefore, a continuator was invented. A continuator is one of the inheritors, one of the legal successors, whom everybody recognises, but it doesn't require ratification. It is simply a declaration that it is recognised as a continuing state of the legal function that is written in the UN Charter for the USSR and now for Russia. It was a manoeuvre. The republics agreed. The other 4 permanent members of the UNSC agreed. If someone disagreed, raised their hand and said ‘Where is the Soviet Union? Yesterday the Soviet Union was sitting here, and now someone under the sign of the Russian Federation. What is this?', it would have failed. There was a unique moment when the decision could have been challenged easily. But now it is an irrevocable decision and it is impossible to challenge it.

In an interview with the UN Radio, Ambassador Yuli Vorontsov described:

Our cooperation with the leading Western countries and, first of all, with the United States has worked out well. American lawyers gave us a very good legal option, which made the disputes about what belongs to the Russian Federation and what does not belong to it pointless. They suggested that our application to change the name of the country should say, as we said at the time, that the Russian Federation was the continuator of the Soviet Union. That word “ continuator” helped out a lot. A continuator means that Russia continues to have a seat on the Security Council. The other countries, the former Soviet republics, were newly independent states. They could not be continuators. The Secretary General was given a message from President Yeltsin. This message said that we, the Russian Federation, being the continuator of the Soviet Union in the United Nations, notify you that the name of the country will now be different - the Russian Federation. In fact, the whole process outwardly looked like a simple change of the sign at the table of delegations in the General Assembly and the Security Council. Instead of the nameplate 'Soviet Union' the name 'Russian Federation' appeared.

After that, in the official documents of the organization “USSR” was changed to “Russia”. For example, at the meeting of the Security Council on 23 December 1991, Vorontsov was listed as the representative of the Soviet Union, and already on 31 December as the representative of the Russian Federation. On 31 January 1992, John Major, chairman of the Security Council and British Prime Minister, said to Yeltsin personally, who was attending a Security Council meeting: “Mr, President, thank you, I know the Council would wish me to welcome Russia as a permanent member of our Council. You are very welcome indeed.”

Yeltsin in 1993 signed a decree "In order to legally secure the state property of the Russian Federation abroad and in connection with the signing of the Agreement on the distribution of all property of the former USSR abroad of 6 July 1992, I hereby decree: The Russian Federation, as a continuing state of the Union of the SSR, assumes all rights to the immovable and movable property of the former USSR located abroad, as well as the fulfilment of all obligations related to the use of this property."

According to the letter of the Ministry of Justice of the Russian Federation dated 16 January 2012 N 07-1407:

From the point of view of international law, the geopolitical transformations of 1991 did not lead to the disappearance of the USSR as a subject of international law. Despite the changes in territory, length of borders, size of population, etc., the state called ‘USSR’ did not cease to exist, but continued its international legal personality under the name of ‘Russian Federation’. The term ‘continuity’ is used in international law to denote this kind of phenomenon. A State continuing under a new name to fulfil international rights and obligations in respect of the relevant territory, population, property, etc., is called a ‘continuing State’. In terms of its legal consequences, the situation of continuation is fundamentally different from that of succession. Whereas in the case of succession, international rights and obligations are transferred by an expression of will from one State (‘predecessor State’) to another (‘successor State’), that is, from one subject of international law to another, in the case of continuation, their exercise is automatically continued by the same State, a subject of international law, but with a different name.

The approval of a State as a continuing or successor State depends not only on its own will, but also on the recognition of the relevant status by the international community. The status of the Russian Federation as a continuation State of the USSR has been officially or quietly recognised by the international community as a whole and by virtually all States individually. The statement of Russian continuity is contained, for example, in the Russian-German statement of 21 November 1991, the joint declaration of the Russian Federation and the United Kingdom of 1992, and the official statements of the governments of Belgium and Sweden. In the joint statement of 23 December 1991, the EC Member States acknowledged that ‘the international rights and obligations of the former USSR, including rights and obligations under the UN Charter, will continue to be exercised by Russia’. The EC Member States welcomed the Russian Government's agreement to assume such obligations and responsibilities and declared that as such they would continue their friendly relations with our country, taking into account the change in its constitutional status.

Russia's status as a continuation state of the USSR is stated in many international treaties concluded by our country after 1991, including agreements on the inventory of the treaty and legal framework between Russia and foreign states (for example, intergovernmental protocols with Romania, Macedonia, Cyprus, Croatia, the Czech Republic, Slovakia, Denmark, Greece, Hungary). The Treaty between the Russian Federation and the Kingdom of Belgium on Consent and Cooperation of 8 December 1993, the Treaty between Russia and France of 7 February 1992, the Agreement between the Government of the Russian Federation and the Government of the Federal Republic of Germany on Cultural Cooperation of 16 December 1992, the Agreement between the Government of the Russian Federation and the European Space Agency on the Establishment of the Permanent Mission of the Agency in the Russian Federation of 10 April 1995, and others. The recognition of the status of a continuing state of the USSR was also reflected in Russia's continuation of the Soviet Union's membership in international organisations.

== Nuclear weapons ==
The US Secretary of State James Baker at the time stated that no one but Russia could control Soviet nuclear weapons, in particular, making a statement on 10 December 1991 at Princeton University.

On December 21, 1991, the Republic of Belarus, the Republic of Kazakhstan, the Russian Federation (RSFSR) and Ukraine signed the Agreement on Joint Measures Regarding Nuclear Weapons, according to which "until the complete elimination of nuclear weapons in the territories of the Republic of Belarus and Ukraine, the decision on the need to use them shall be taken in agreement with the heads of state participating in the Agreement by the President of the RSFSR", "the Republic of Belarus and Ukraine undertake to accede to the 1968 Treaty on the Non-Proliferation of Nuclear Weapons as non-nuclear states and to conclude an appropriate safeguards agreement with the IAEA", "by July 1, 1992, the Republic of Belarus, the Republic of Kazakhstan and Ukraine will ensure the removal of tactical nuclear weapons" and "the Governments of the Republic of Belarus, the Republic of Kazakhstan, the Russian Federation (RSFSR) and Ukraine undertake to submit the START Treaty for ratification to the Supreme Councils of their states". Belarus, Russia and Kazakhstan have ratified the agreement, but since Ukraine has not ratified it, it has not entered into force.

On December 25, M.S. Gorbachev announced his resignation as President of the USSR and handed over the "nuclear briefcase" to the President of the RSFSR B.N. Yeltsin.

On December 30, 1991, 11 countries signed the Agreement between the participant states of the Commonwealth of Independent States on Strategic Forces, according to which "the member states of the Commonwealth recognize the need for a unified command of the Strategic Forces and the maintenance of unified control over nuclear weapons", "For the period until their complete destruction, nuclear weapons deployed on the territory of Ukraine are under the control of the unified command of the Strategic Forces with the aim of not using them and dismantling them by the end of 1994, including tactical nuclear weapons - by July 1, 1992", "The process of destroying nuclear weapons deployed on the territory of the Republic of Belarus and Ukraine is carried out with the participation of the Republic of Belarus, the Russian Federation and Ukraine under the joint control of the Commonwealth states". The document entered into force for 11 countries on December 30.

== Debts and assets ==
On 4 December 1991, 12 republics (except the Baltic states) signed an agreement on joint liability for repaying the USSR's debt to external creditors, according to which Russia's share was 61% of the Soviet debt. In order to leave the agreement on joint liability in the past, Russia proposed a "zero option".

After the dissolution of the USSR on 26 December 1991, all former Soviet Union property was automatically transferred to Russian ownership. On 2 April 1992, Russia declared itself the sole legal successor to all debts of the former USSR and pledged to repay them in full, while receiving rights to all financial and material assets of the USSR. The remaining former Soviet republics could start with a "clean slate". In this case, they would have neither debts nor assets.

On 30 December 1991, 11 countries signed the Agreement of the Heads of State of the Commonwealth of Independent States on the property of the former USSR abroad, according to which "the member states of the Commonwealth mutually recognize that each of them has the right to an appropriate fixed fair share in the property of the former USSR abroad and will facilitate the implementation of this right." The document entered into force for 11 countries on December 30.

On 13 March 1992, the CIS Council of Heads of Government signed the Charter of the Interstate Council for Supervision of Debt Servicing and Use of Assets of the Union of Soviet Socialist Republics.

On 13 March 1992, the CIS Council of Heads of Government signed the Agreement on Amendments to the Agreement on Succession in respect of External State Debt and Assets of the Union of Soviet Socialist Republics of December 4, 1991.

On 6 July 1992, 11 countries signed the Agreement on the distribution of all property of the former USSR abroad, according to which "the termination of the existence of the USSR as a state-subject of international law dictates the need for the earliest possible settlement of a set of issues related to the property of the former USSR abroad between the successor states represented by the Republic of Azerbaijan, the Republic of Armenia, the Republic of Belarus, the Republic of Kazakhstan, the Republic of Kyrgyzstan, the Republic of Moldova, the Russian Federation, the Republic of Tajikistan, Turkmenistan, the Republic of Uzbekistan and Ukraine." Movable and immovable property of the former USSR outside its territory and investments located abroad are subject to division and shall pass to the Parties in accordance with the following scale of fixed shares in the assets of the former USSR based on a single aggregate indicator. The share (in percent) is as follows:

- Republic of Azerbaijan 1.64
- Republic of Armenia 0.86
- Republic of Belarus 4.13
- Republic of Kazakhstan 3.86
- Republic of Kyrgyzstan 0.95
- Republic of Moldova 1.29
- Russian Federation 61.34
- Republic of Tajikistan 0.82
- Turkmenistan 0.70
- Republic of Uzbekistan 3.27
- Ukraine 16.37
- TOTAL 95.23 (because "The combined share of Georgia, Latvia, Lithuania and Estonia, amounting to 4.77 percent, is not covered by this Agreement)

The document entered into force for 11 countries on 6 July 1992.

As the Kommersant newspaper wrote in 2006, "The statement of a group of creditor countries made during negotiations between representatives of the governments of these countries and a delegation of the Russian Federation in Paris on 2 April 1993 noted that the issue of the distribution of responsibility for the payment of the debt of the former USSR to foreign creditors should be resolved through the conclusion of bilateral agreements between the Russian Federation and other successor states of the former Union. As a result, the debt and assets of the USSR were transferred to Russia." On 9 December 1994, Ukraine and the Russian Federation concluded the Treaty on the Settlement of Issues of Succession to the External State Debts and Assets of the former USSR (the so-called ‘Zero Option’ Treaty). According to this treaty, Ukraine transfers to the Russian Federation the obligations to pay Ukraine's share in the external debt of the former USSR (Article 3), and the Russian Federation accepts Ukraine's share in the assets of the former USSR (Article 4) as of 1 December 1991. At the same time, the Treaty on the “zero option” has not been ratified by the Verkhovna Rada yet, i.e. it has no legal force.

Ukraine is the only former Soviet republic that has not ratified the zero-option treaty as of 2024.

As a result of the Russian government's announcement on 2 April 1993 that it would assume all obligations of the former Soviet republics to repay the USSR's foreign debt in return for their renunciation of their shares in the USSR's foreign assets, Russia received the entire external debt of 96.6 billion USD. This amount included loans from other countries and commercial obligations to members of the London Club of creditors, holders of VEB bonds and domestic government foreign currency loan bonds (OVGVZ). In 2017, the Russian Ministry of Finance announced that it had paid off the entire debt of the USSR and the last country to receive the money was Bosnia and Herzegovina. In 2022, the Russian embassy in the UK estimated that Russia paid out 110 billion dollars on its own.

In 2014, Ukrainian Prime Minister Arseniy Yatsenyuk raised the issue, to which the Russian Foreign Ministry responded at the time that Moscow reserves the right to insist that Ukraine immediately compensate $20 billion if Kiev returns to the “zero option” problem. In 2020, 2021 and 2022, Vladimir Putin reminded that Ukraine has still not ratified and acted on the signed document and continues to demand some of the assets of the former Soviet Union.

In the summer of 2022, Ukraine demanded the return of “at least a third of what is abroad (of the Soviet Union)”, including some facilities in the United Kingdom that Ukraine believes “were illegally registered to the Russian Federation”. The speaker of the State Duma, Vyacheslav Volodin, responded that Kiev should have taken on one third of the USSR debts before making such claims.

== Internal debt ==
On 13 March 1992, the CIS Council of Heads of Government signed the Agreement on Principles and Mechanism of Servicing the Internal Debt of the Former USSR.

On March 13, 1992 the CIS Council of Heads of Governments signed an Appeal of the Heads of Governments of the participant states of the Commonwealth of Independent States and the Republic of Georgia in connection with the adoption of the Agreement on Principles and Mechanism of Servicing the Internal Debt of the Former USSR.

== Domestic property and organizations ==
On 14 February 1992, the Heads of State instructed the heads of government and national (central) banks of the Commonwealth participating states to prepare within two weeks an interstate agreement on the division of assets and liabilities of the former State Bank of the USSR.

On 20 March 1992, the CIS Council of Heads of State signed an Agreement on the division of assets and liabilities of the former State Bank of the USSR between the central banks of the participant states of the Commonwealth of Independent States.

On 6 July 1992 the CIS Council of Heads of State signed the Agreement on Succession to the State Archives of the former Union of Soviet Socialist Republics.

On 9 October 1992, the CIS Council of Heads of State signed the Agreement on Mutual Recognition of Rights and Regulation of Property Relations.

== Legacy of the Russian Empire ==
In 1996, Paris and Moscow signed an accord for Russia to partly repay czarist bonds. In 2010, Advokatskaya Gazeta, the newspaper of the Federal Chamber of Lawyers of the Russian Federation, reported that "In France, lawsuits were also filed against the Russian government, demanding repayment of the loan (in full). However, the court (in France) refused to recognize the Russian Federation as a guarantor for the issuance of the tsarist loans. According to the court's position, the actions of the Russian Empire are covered by diplomatic immunity, which the Russian Federation inherited as the legal successor of the Russian Empire and which neutralizes lawsuits directed against the Russian Federation."
