= Anglo-American School of St. Petersburg =

Coordinates: 59.953424°N 30.304657°E

The Anglo American School of St. Petersburg (AASSP), located in Saint Petersburg, Russia, was a branch of the Anglo-American School of Moscow (AAS). It was an independent, non-profit, co-educational day school that served students from Kindergarten through Grade 12. The 280 students represented 34 nationalities. The school was closed on the 21st of September 2018 due to the American consulate in Saint Petersburg being closed.

Its campus is in proximity to the Saint Petersburg Zoo.

A part-time Japanese school, the St.Petersburg Japanese Language School (サンクト･ペテルブルグ日本語補習校 Sankuto Peteruburugu Nihongo Hoshūkō), held classes at the Anglo-American School Saint Petersburg branch.

== History ==
The Anglo-American School in St. Petersburg was established in 1975.

The Anglo-American School in St. Petersburg shut its doors after 43 years in operation in 2018. The closure occurred after the Russian government forced the closure of the American and British consulates and the British Council office in St. Petersburg; after those closures, the school was no longer legally feasible. The closure of the consulates occurred in spring of 2018, a couple of months after the graduation of the 2018 class which happened to be the biggest graduating class in school history with 15 students. In the summer of 2018 the school received permission to work for another school year (2018-19) with a condition that it register according to local legislation. In September 2018 the decision was reversed and the school was ordered to shut down within 3 days. Close to 100 students of many nationalities were not able to continue their education for most of the school year.

The Russian government's actions were in retaliation to the expulsion of Russian diplomats, that were retaliations for the attempted poisoning of Sergei Skripal.

In 2019, the Brookes Saint Petersburg International School opened its doors in the same building.

== See also ==
- List of higher education and academic institutions in Saint Petersburg

Russian embassy schools in the United States and United Kingdom:

- Russian Embassy School in London
- Russian Mission School in New York
- Russian Embassy School in Washington, D.C.
