= Anglo-American School of Moscow =

Coordinates: 55.8270°N 37.4615°E

Anglo-American School of Moscow (AAS Moscow)
- Англо-американская школа - Москва

Location
- 1 Beregovaya Street, 125367 Moscow, Russia; Moscow

Information
- Other name: AAS Moscow
- Type: Non-profit, International day school
- Established: 1949
- Closed: May 12, 2023
- CEEB code: 788590
- Director: Rhonda Norris
- Enrollment: 250 students (2022-23)
- Area: 6 hectares
- Mascot: Penguin
- Website: https://www.aas.ru/

AAS Moscow, formally known as Anglo-American School of Moscow (Russian: Англо-американская школа в Москве, romanized: Anglo-amerikanskaya shkola v Moskvye) was an independent, non-profit, co-educational, international day school in Moscow, Russia, catering for students between the ages of 4 and 18 (Pre-kindergarten to Grade 12). On May 12, 2023, AAS announced that it would permanently be closing the AAS NKO organization and not seek further pathways for future operations.

AAS Moscow was founded in 1949 to serve the educational needs of diplomatic children who could not attend Soviet schools at the time.

It was located a few miles northwest of downtown Moscow in the Pokrovskoye-Streshnevo District. AAS Moscow delivered an international standards-based curriculum aligned to recommendations of US professional associations. Grade 11 and 12 students could opt into the DP IB International Baccalaureate program and the Primary Years Program (PYP) was the focus for younger children.

During the 2018–19 school year, AAS had 1200 students from 60 nationalities; the majority U.S. Americans as a diplomatic school. As of 2021, AAS Moscow was no longer a diplomatic school. AAS was then a not-for-profit, fully accredited organization through New England Association of Schools and Colleges (NEASC) and it had the International Baccalaureate Organization (IBO) authorization for the PYP and DP learning.

AAS Moscow had approximately 250 students from 15 nationalities. 37% of the student demographic were Russian, 14% South Korean, 13.5% from the United States, 6% Indian, and the rest range from Turkey, Kazakhstan, China, and Colombia.

The school was fully accredited by the New England Association of Schools and Colleges, the Council of International Schools, and the International Baccalaureate Organization. It was also a member of the National Association of Independent Schools, the European Council of International Schools, and the Central and Eastern European Schools Association.

== History ==
In 2023 a court in Moscow ordered AAS Moscow to pause its operations for a 90-day period for allegedly violating Russian educational requirements.

On May 12, 2023, AAS announced that it would permanently be closing the AAS NKO organization and not seek further pathways for future operations.

In June 2023, the Russian Ministry of Justice designated school as a "foreign agent". According to officials, the educational institution promoted LGBT values. The US protested.

== Overview ==
The school operated under the aegis of a director and a board of trustees. It was organized into three divisions, elementary school (pre-K to grade 5), the middle school (grades 6–8) and high school (grades 9–12). Each division has a principal. The high school was closed in 2022.

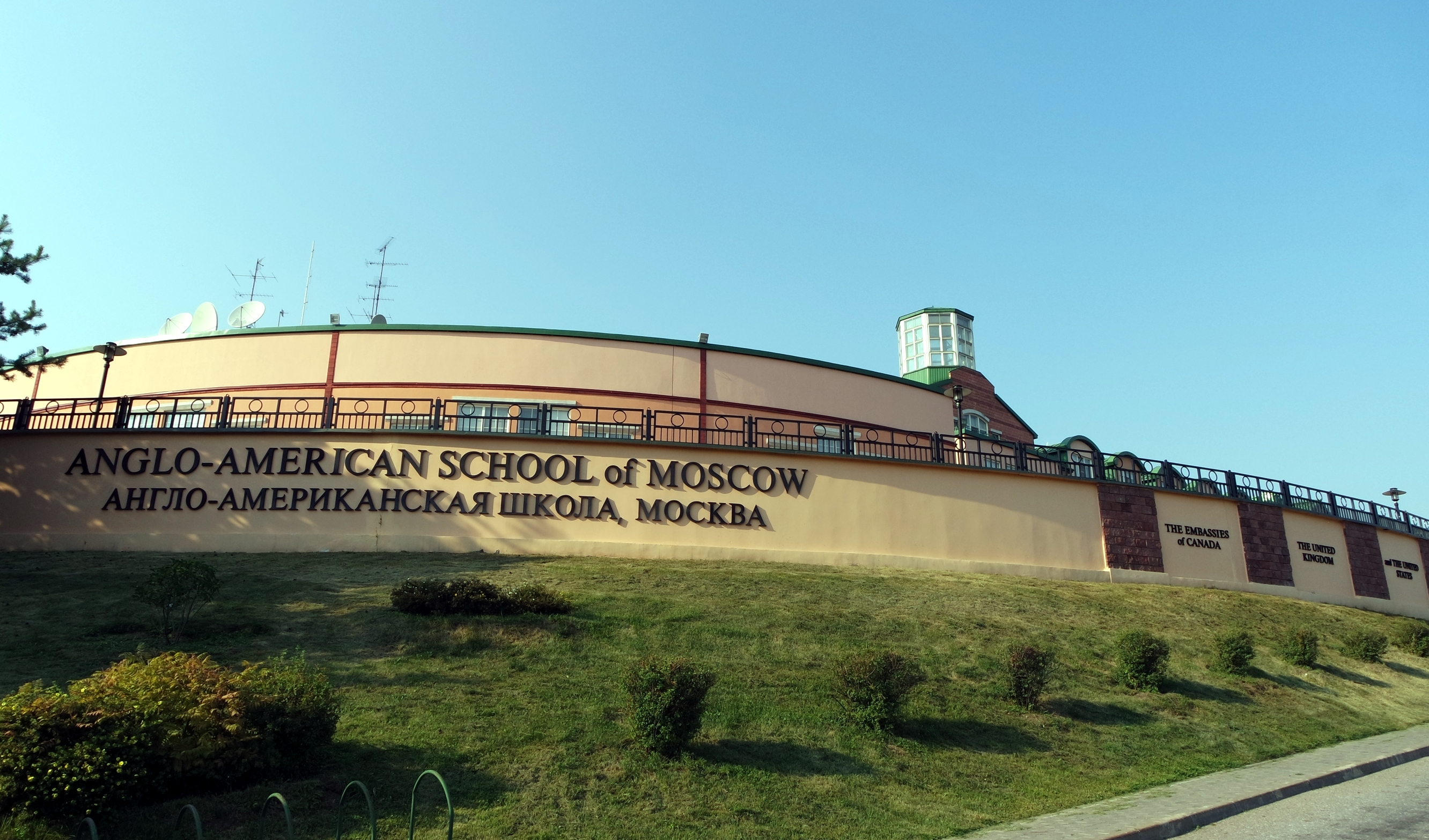
AAS campus with the sign

The high school offered the International Baccalaureate Diploma Programme, and a college-preparatory program leading to a high school diploma. The elementary school offered the International Baccalaureate Primary Years Programme. The school performed well.

== Student body and life ==
As of the 2022–2023 school year, AAS Moscow had approximately 250 students from 15 nationalities. 37% of the student demographic Russian, 14% South Korean, 13.5% from the United States, 6% Indian, and the rest from Israel, Turkey, Kazakhstan, China, and Colombia.

== Fees ==
The school was a not-for-profit organization financed by school fees. Support from the chartering embassies was of a non-financial nature. Fees differed by age group, ranging from $18,400–$31,600 USD.

== Facilities ==
In the year 2000, AAS Moscow moved into a purpose-built campus nestled between the Pokrovskoye-Streshnevo Forest Park and the Moscow River canal, and adjacent to the Pokrovsky Hills community.

== Saint Petersburg campus ==
The school also had a campus in Saint Petersburg which closed in September 2018.

== See also ==
Russian embassy schools in the United States and the United Kingdom:

- Russian Embassy School in London
- Russian Mission School in New York
- Russian Embassy School in Washington, D.C.
