= Exchange Bank =

Exchange Bank or Exchange Bank Building may refer to:

- American Exchange National Bank, Broadway & Cedar Street, New York, built 1900, demolished 1964
- Exchange Bank (El Dorado, Arkansas), a National Register of Historic Places (NRHP) listing in Union County, Arkansas
- Exchange Bank Building (Little Rock, Arkansas)
- Exchange Bank Building (Tallahassee, Florida)
- Genesee Exchange Bank, Genesee, Idaho
- Meridian Exchange Bank, an NRHP listing in Ada County, Idaho
- Exchange Bank (Golden, Illinois)
- Exchange Bank Building (Farmington, Minnesota)
- Smithfield Exchange Bank, Smithfield, Rhode Island

== See also ==
- Davis-Exchange Bank Building, an NRHP listing in Dougherty County, Georgia
- Stock Exchange Bank, an NRHP listing in Ellis County, Oklahoma
- Farmers' and Exchange Bank, Charleston, South Carolina
- National Loan and Exchange Bank Building, an NRHP listing in Columbia, South Carolina
- American Exchange Bank, Madison, Wisconsin, an NRHP listing in Dane County, Wisconsin
