= Lyles-Gudmundson House =

Historic house in South Carolina, United States

- U.S. National Register of Historic Places
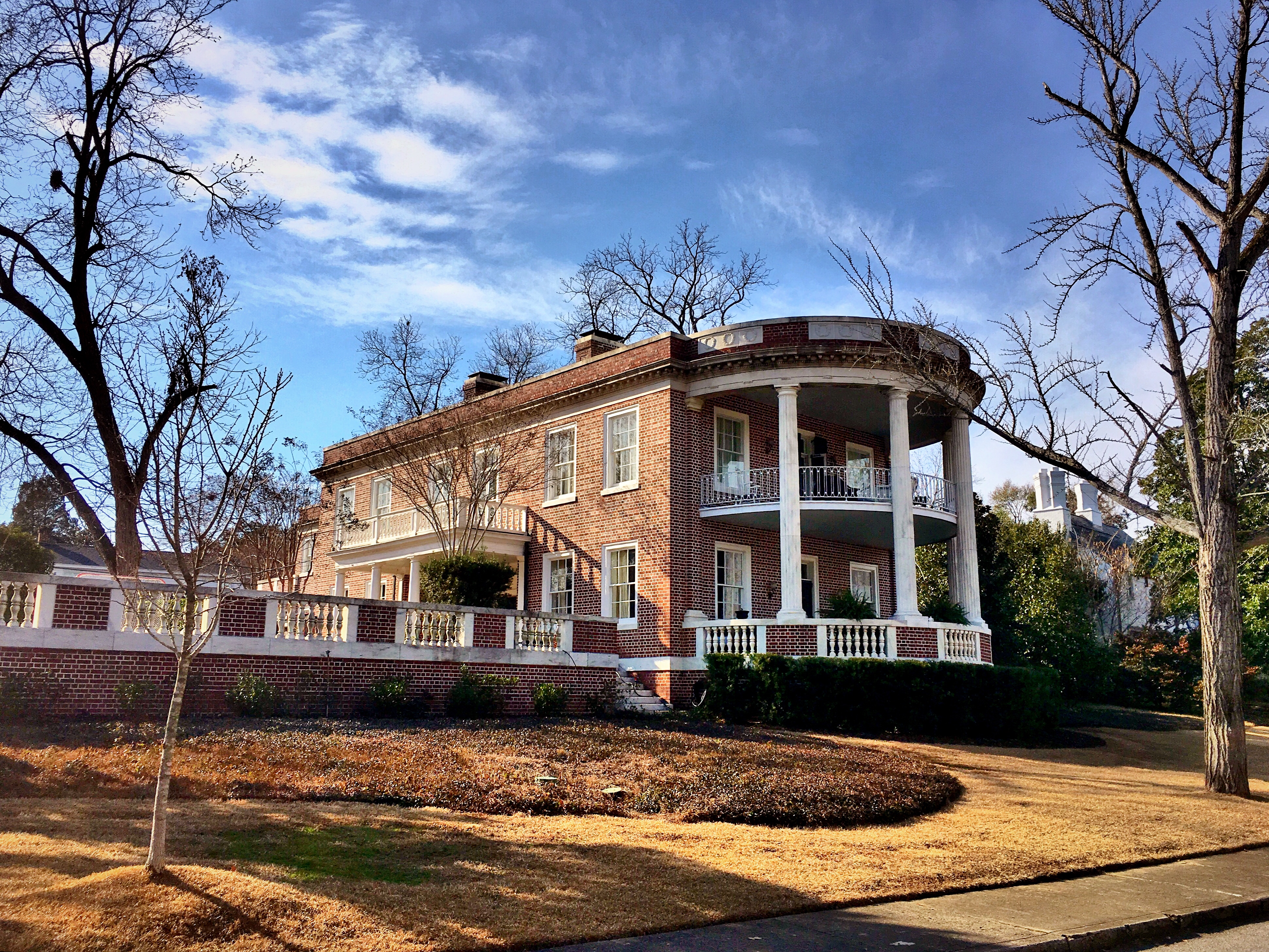

- Location within South Carolina Location within the United States
- Location: Address Restricted; Columbia, South Carolina
- Coordinates: 33°59′32″N 81°00′55″W
- Area: 0.5 acres (0.20 ha)
- Built: 1918-1922
- Architect: James Brite
- Architectural style: Classical Revival
- MPS: Columbia MRA
- NRHP reference No.: 79003364
- Added to NRHP: March 2, 1979

Lyles-Gudmundson House is a historic landmark home located in Columbia, South Carolina. It was built between 1918 and 1922, and is a two-story Classical Revival style brick dwelling. The home was a wedding gift for Evelyn Robertson Lyles, the daughter of Edwin Wales Robertson. A banker who is credited with much of Columbia's early twentieth century development, Robertson commissioned New York City architect James Brite to design his daughter's home as part of his Wales Garden neighborhood. Brite - a native North Carolinian who died in 1942 - was also the architect of The Braes in Glen Cove, New York and the famous Darlington Mansion near Mahwah, New Jersey.

Construction began in 1918, but was delayed because of difficulty in obtaining materials from Europe. It features the iconic semicircular side portico with four two-story high fluted marble columns and a full entablature.

The 6,000 square foot home features a pool and courtyard, all-original windows, four wood-burning fireplaces, and 10-foot ceilings. It was added to the National Register of Historic Places in 1979. The home was constructed during the 1918 Influenza pandemic (1918-1920), and was recently sold in May 2020 during the coronavirus (COVID-19) pandemic to the third family to own the home in nearly a century.
