= Rotherwas Room =

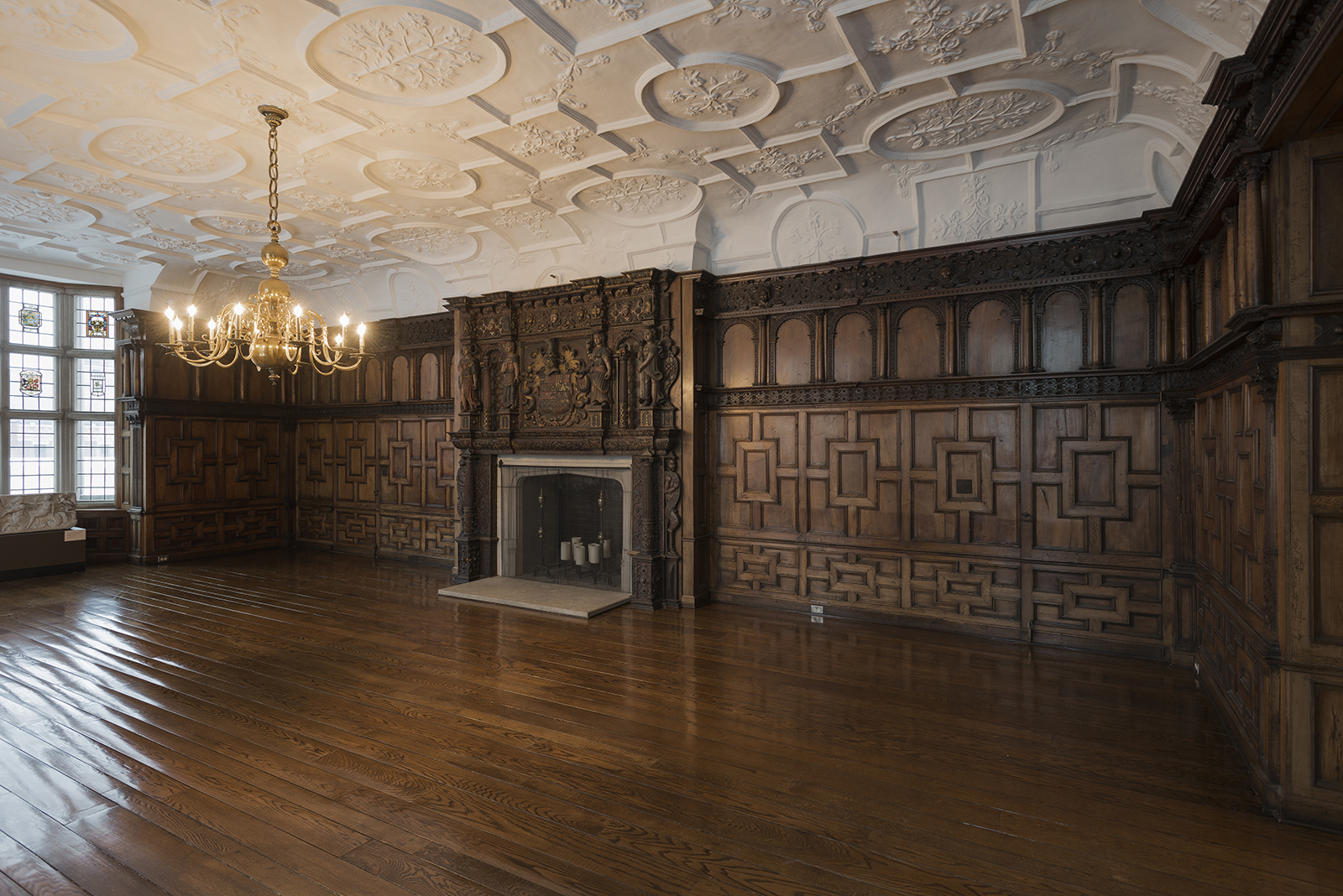
- The Rotherwas Room currently resides at the Mead Art Museum at Amherst College.
- Building: Mead Art Museum; originally from Rotherwas Court, Herefordshire
- Location: Amherst, Massachusetts, US; originally from Herefordshire, England
- Purpose: gallery/study/event room; originally an English country house parlor
- Named for: Rotherwas Court, Herefordshire

The Rotherwas Room is an English Jacobean room currently in the Mead Art Museum, in Amherst College.

It was originally installed in the estate of the Bodenham family called Rotherwas Court, in Herefordshire, England, as part of the country house where the family lived. It was commissioned by Sir Roger Bodenham sometime after 1600, and completed in 1611. Some of the room's most prominent aspects include a carved oak mantelpiece and walnut wall panelling. The room originally functioned as a parlor, where families would dine privately or entertain guests informally.

In 1944, Herbert L. Pratt bequeathed the room to the college. It had been previously installed in his Neo-Jacobean House "The Braes," in Glen Cove, Long Island. Although the wall panelling and the mantelpiece of the original room remain, no specific records of the furniture or the ceiling design of this room in the original Rotherwas Court house have been found.

== History ==
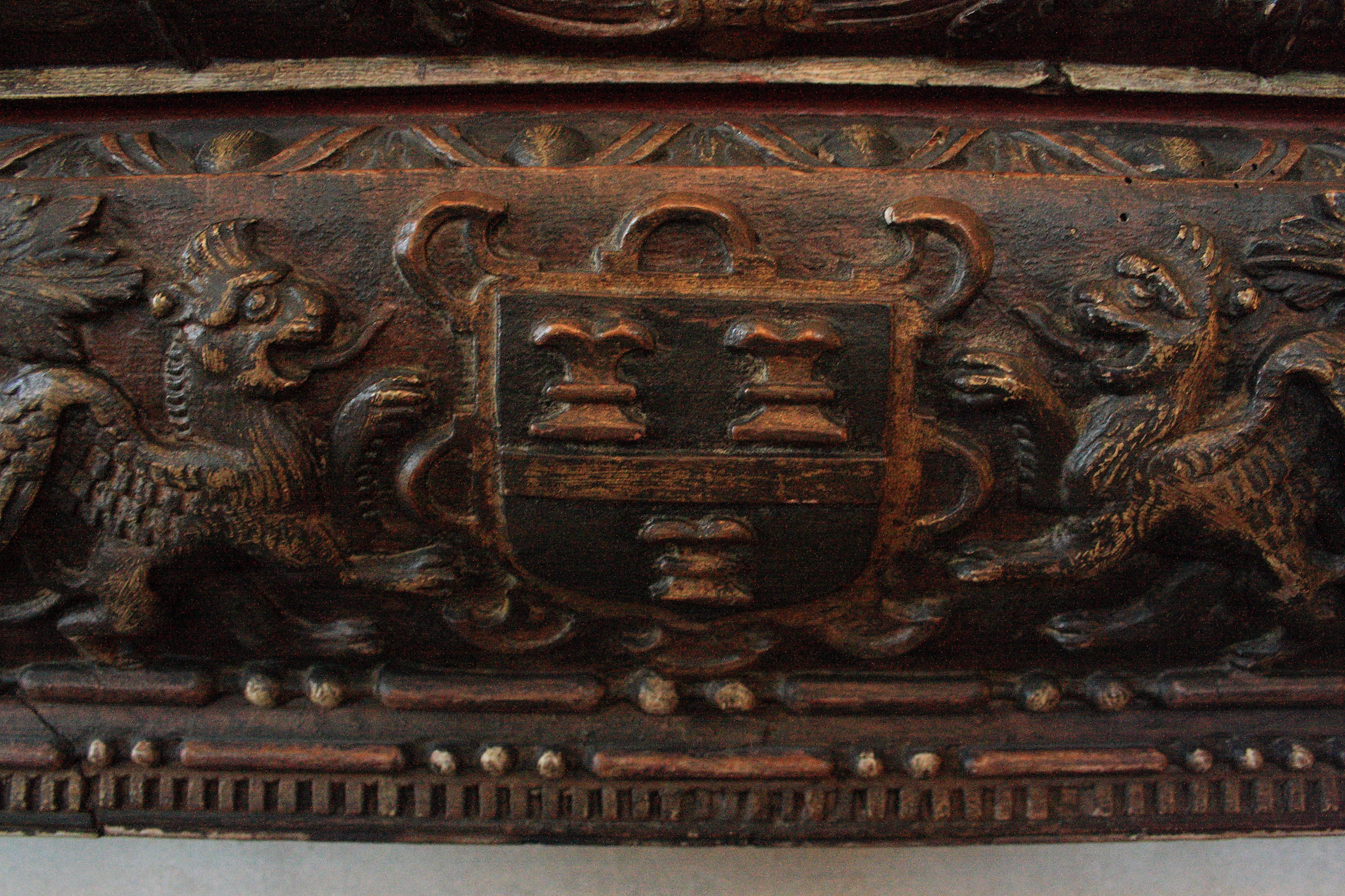
Detail of the Bodenham family seal. Carved, painted oak in the overmantle of the chimneypiece in the Rotherwas Room.

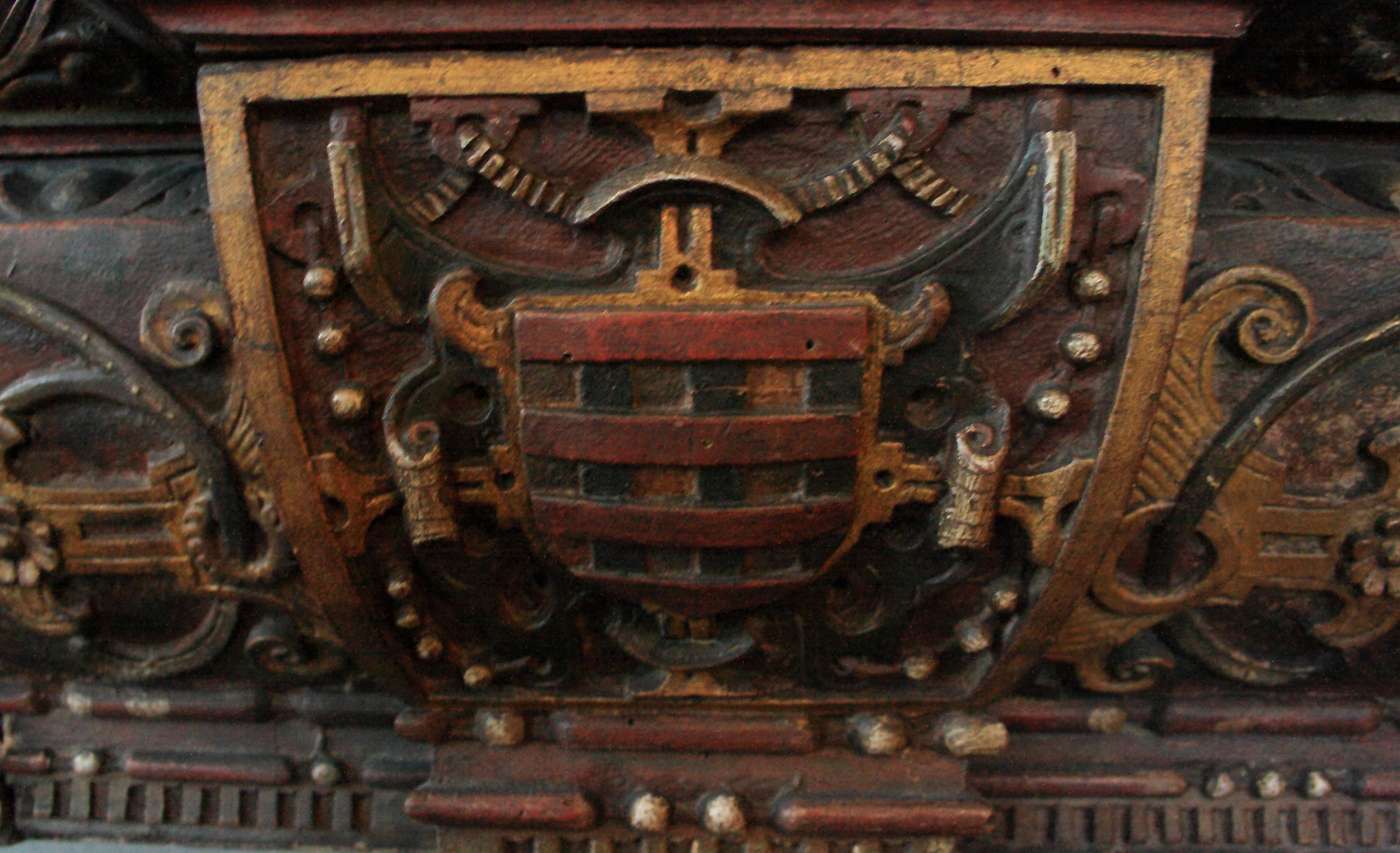
Detail of the de la Barre family seal. Carved, painted oak in the overmantle of the chimneypiece in the Rotherwas Room.

=== Family ===
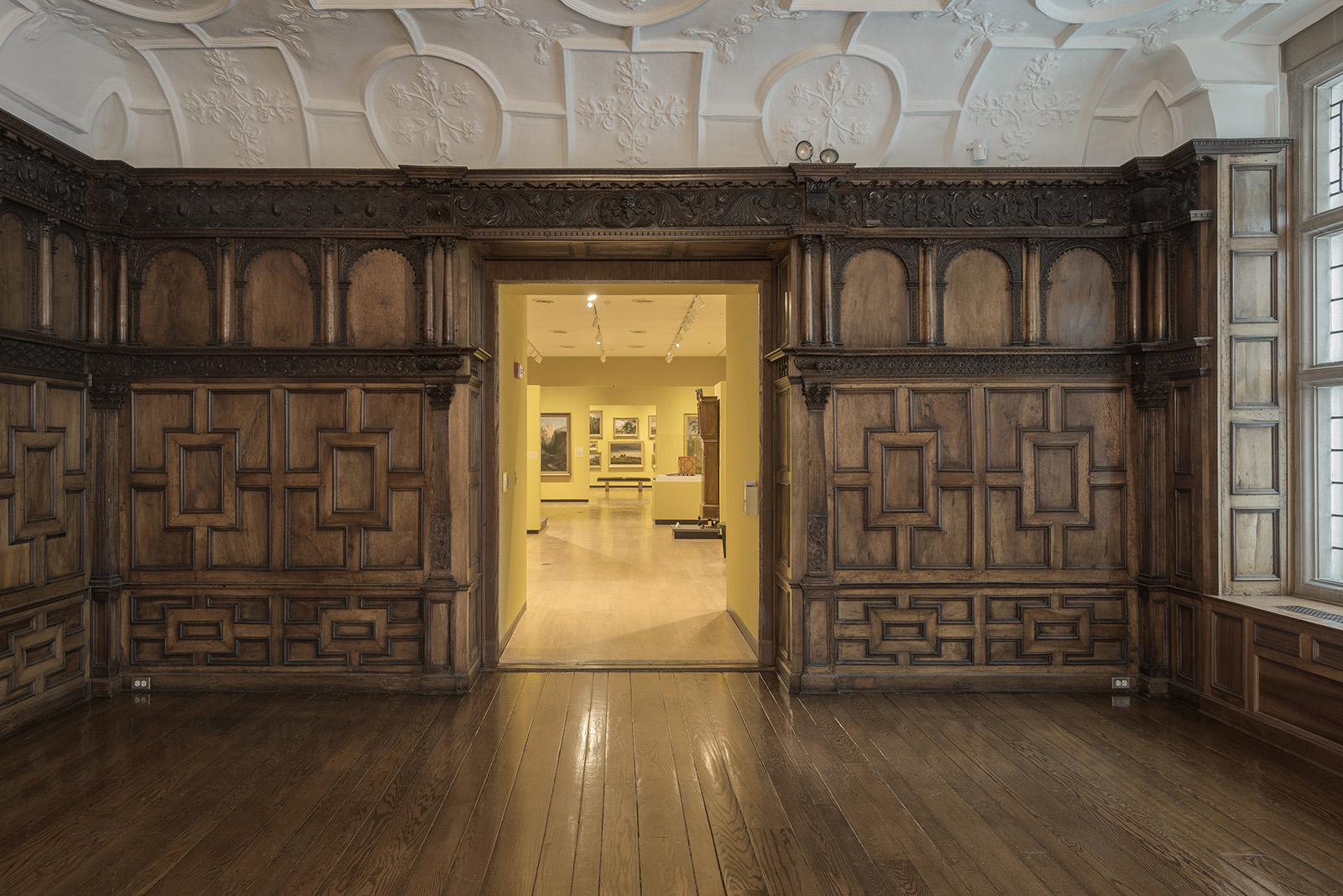
View of the entrance to the Rotherwas Room from its interior.

The name "Rotherwas" first appeared in the Domesday Book commissioned by William the Conqueror in 1086. The entry notes: "Land of Gilbert Son of Thorold. In Dinedor Hundred. Gilbert son of Thurold holds Rotherwas." The land sits near the River Wye in Herefordshire and belonged to the de la Barre family. In the early fifteenth century, John Bodenham of Dewchurch married Isabella de la Barre, heiress of Walter de la Barre. This marriage created an alliance between the two families. Therefore, following the death of Sir Charles de la Barre in 1483, Roger Bodenham, the grandson of John Bodenham, inherited the property. The Bodenham and de la Barre family line continued until 1884, when the last direct descendant, Charles de la Barre Bodenham, died. Even though the Bodenham family members were not the initial lords of the Rotherwas estate, they did control other areas around the River Wye. During the reign of Edward I, Sir John de Bodenham was one of the lords of Monington Stradley in Herefordshire.

In the early seventeenth century, Sir Roger Bodenham, the Bodenham presiding at that time over the Rotherwas estate, commissioned the creation of the Rotherwas Room. The date inscribed on the mantelpiece, 1611, indicates the date of completion. Blount stated in his MSS Collections for Herefordshire, "the house is partly of old tymber work, but an end of it was new built in the last age by Sir Roger." Blount wrote the Herefordshire Manuscripts in 1678 and "last age" indicated approximately three score years and ten earlier. This fact confirms the 1611 date on the fireplace. Additionally, comparisons made to other rooms in houses such as Lyme Halle in Cheshire and Broughton Castle in Oxfordshire, corroborate the inscription and place the room in the early seventeenth century.

The coat of arms on the mantelpiece points to Sir Roger's incentive for commissioning the room. At his coronation on July fifteenth, 1603, James I knighted Sir Roger Bodenham. The coat of arms seems to be "a visual proclamation of Sir Roger's distinguished heritage." James I made many visits to Rotherwas and once reportedly said, "Everyone may not live at Rotherwas."

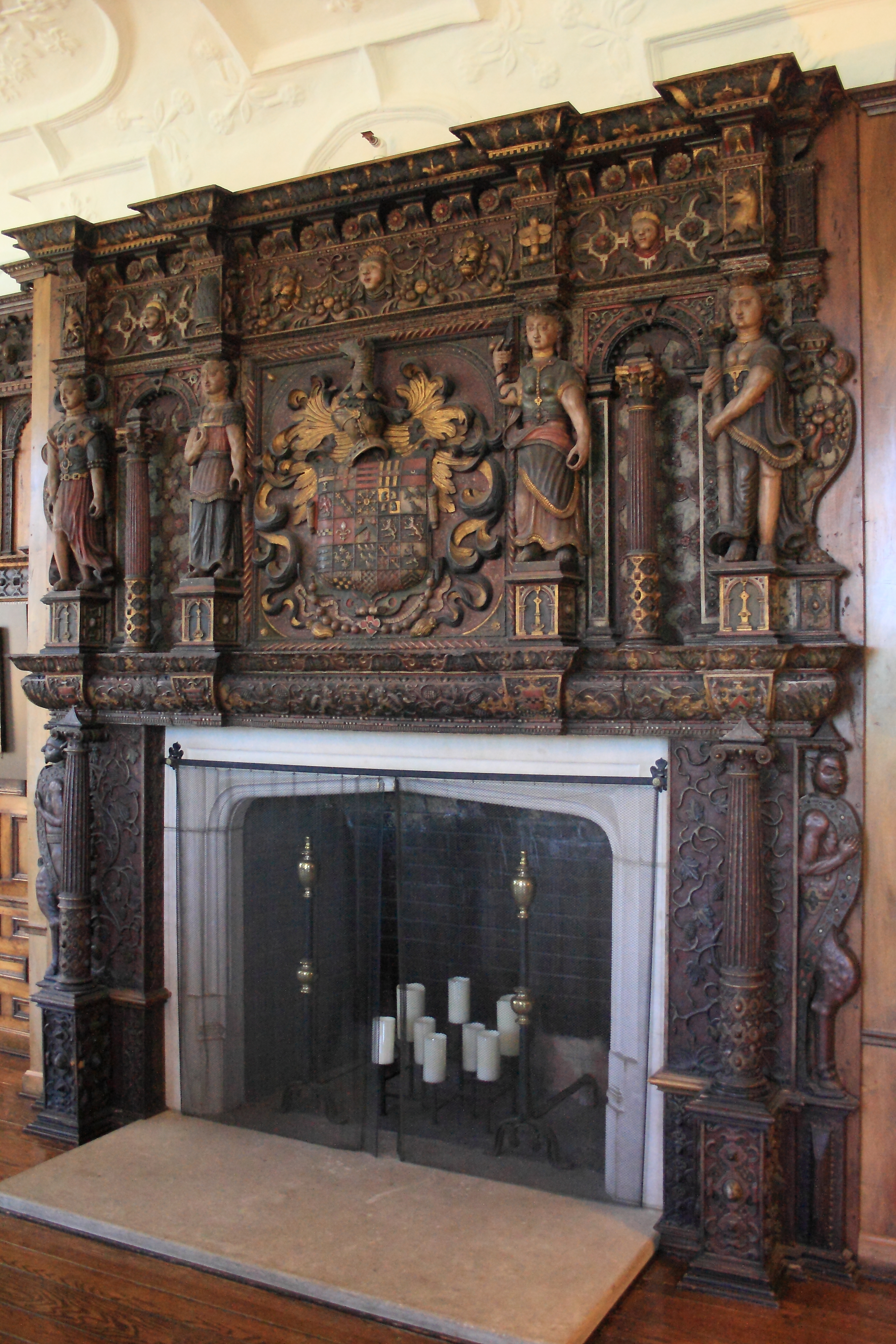
Mantelpiece of the Rotherwas Room. It is made of carved, painted oak, and it contains motifs of Jacobean architecture. The overmantel contains figures of the four Cardinal virtues, as well as an achievement with 25 family seals. The sides of the fireplace include figures of fauns and grapevines.

James I knighted many nobles during his reign. This knighting spree may have been James' way of appeasing his Catholic mother, Mary Queen of Scots. Knighting Catholic Bodenham may have been an example of this appeasement. Christopher Durston argues that James I was clearly a "credal Calvinist," but he respected Catholics more than most Calvinists. Charles Williams stated, "He (James) was anxious to extend toleration to the Catholics- so long as they were not intolerable." In one letter to Robert Cecil he wrote, "I reverence their church as our Mother Church, although clogged with many infirmities and corruptions."

The Bodenhams were Royalists and suffered considerably during the Commonwealth. There was no work done on the building from 1620 to 1685.

=== New house ===
In 1731, Charles Bodenham commissioned architect James Gibbs to build the a new wing of the Rotherwas estate. In the first half of the nineteenth century, Burke wrote: "Since rebuilt, about a century ago; the house is now a large mansion of red brick. Some of the ornaments of the old residence have been removed to the present one and the chimney piece with twenty-five quarterings over it, now stands in the hall." The initials "CB" on the mantelpiece denote Charles Bodenham. Although he did not create the initial room, he did move elements from the original room to the new house. However, not all parts of the room made it into the new wing: "Elements of the paneling and chimneypiece that didn't fit into the eighteenth century enfilade were moved onto ceiling beams or stored in cupboards. At the same time, the room's original ceiling was replaced with oak beams."

=== Braes ===
After the death of Count Lubienski Bodenham in 1912, the family line ended. The Rotherwas estate was dismantled in 1913 and thirteen of the mansion's wood panelled rooms were sent to America. C.J. Charles brought them over the pond to his New York gallery, Charles Gallery, at 718 5th Avenue. C.J. Charles, also known as Charles Duveen or "Charles of London", was the brother of Joseph Duveen, the famous art dealer. Herbert Lee Pratt bought the room for approximately $350,000 in February 1913 with plans to install it in his new home. Herbert Pratt chose architect James Brite to build him a Neo-Jacobean house, called "The Braes" in Glen Cove, Long Island. It was a Jacobean H plan brick house adorned with Tudor and Flemish Renaissance-derived limestone ornamentation on the exterior. Many city dwellers commissioned houses in the English Jacobean or Georgian style homes like country houses of the English style to give them more credibility and status. Brite added a Jacobean style ceiling that replaced the oak beams installed in 1731 and probably looked more like the original room ceiling. The Illustrated London News wrote a story with a headline lamenting the loss of the room, "Lost to England: Superb Rotherwas Panelling for America". However, the papers in the US fawned over the room. The Brooklyn Daily Eagle ran a story in the Sunday paper that read: "Famous Art Treasures for Pratt Country Home."

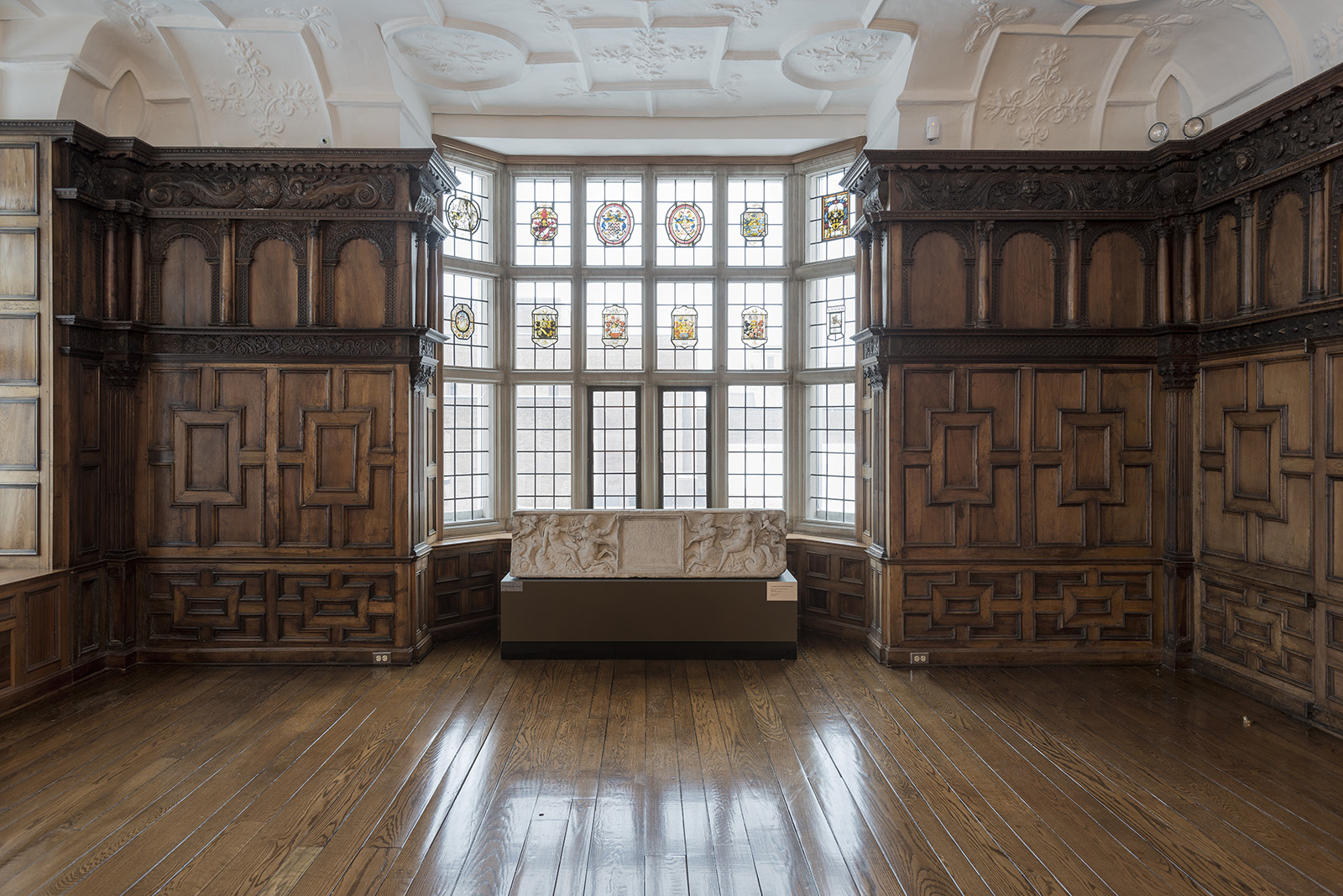
A view of some of the stained glass in the northern window in the Rotherwas Room at the Mead Art Museum, Amherst College. The stained glass was bequeathed by George D. Pratt and was on permanent loan from the Metropolitan Museum of Art until in 2018, when it was donated to the Mead.

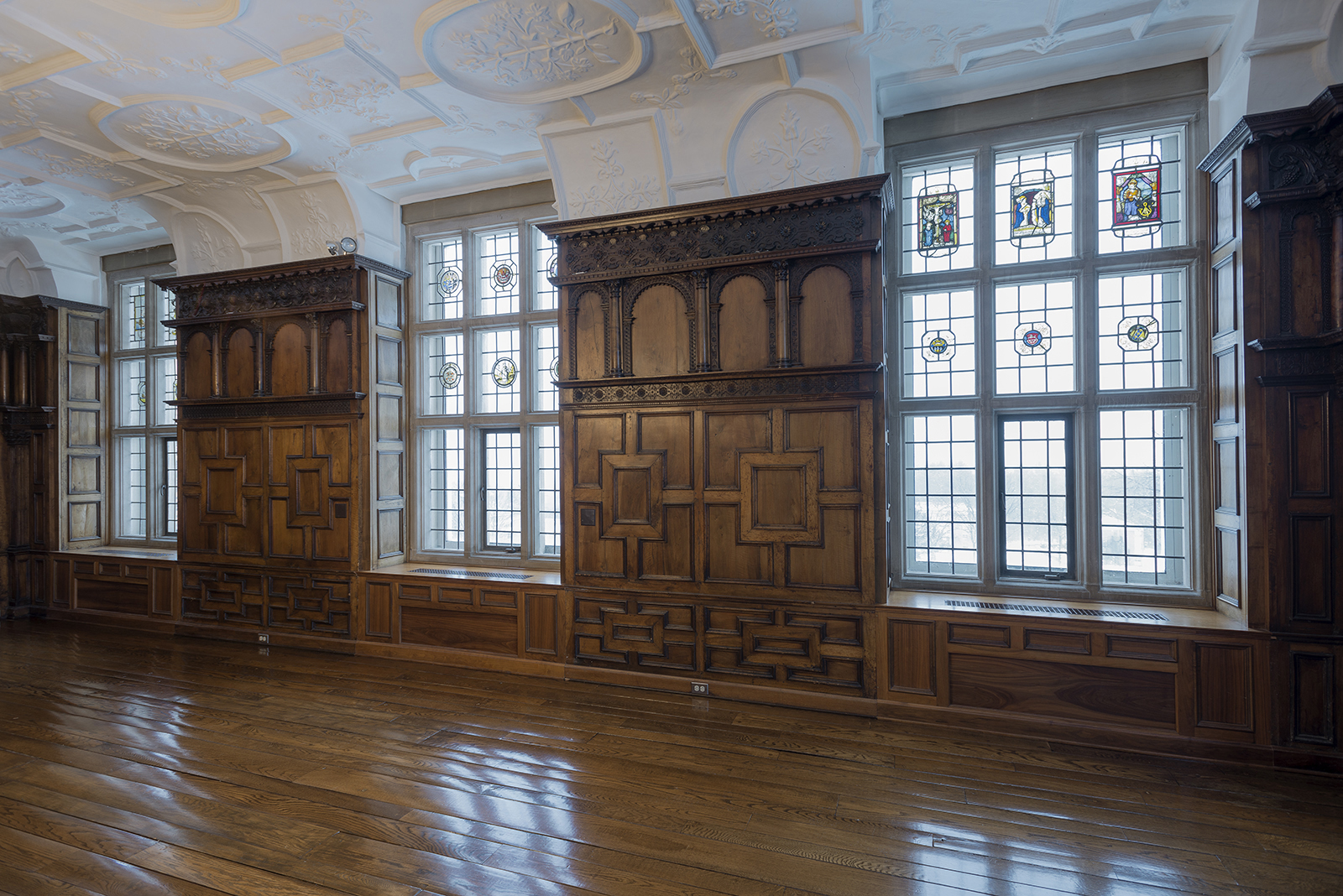
A view of the stained glass windows on the eastern side of the Rotherwas Room. The stained glass windows were bequeathed by George D. Pratt and were on permanent loan form the Metropolitan Museum of Art until 2018, when they were donated to the Mead.

=== Mead Art Museum ===
In 1924, William R. Mead arranged to leave his and his wife's estate to establish a professorship of the fine arts and build a building "worthy of the fine arts." The bequest was paid in 1937, but the recession and the war delayed construction of the building. Construction of the Mead Art Museum started in 1948 on the site of the Old Stearns Church. Herbert L. Pratt not only donated artwork from the seventeenth, eighteenth and nineteenth century, but also bequeathed the Rotherwas Room to the Mead Art Museum. Architect James Kellum Smith of McKim, Mead and White, incorporated the room into the design of the new building. It still stands there today. In 2001, the Mead completed 18 months of renovations. The Rotherwas Room remained untouched except for new sprinklers, motion detectors, better windows and a fresh coat of paint. In the mid-1900s, poet Robert Frost would offer public readings of his poems in the room.

== Function ==
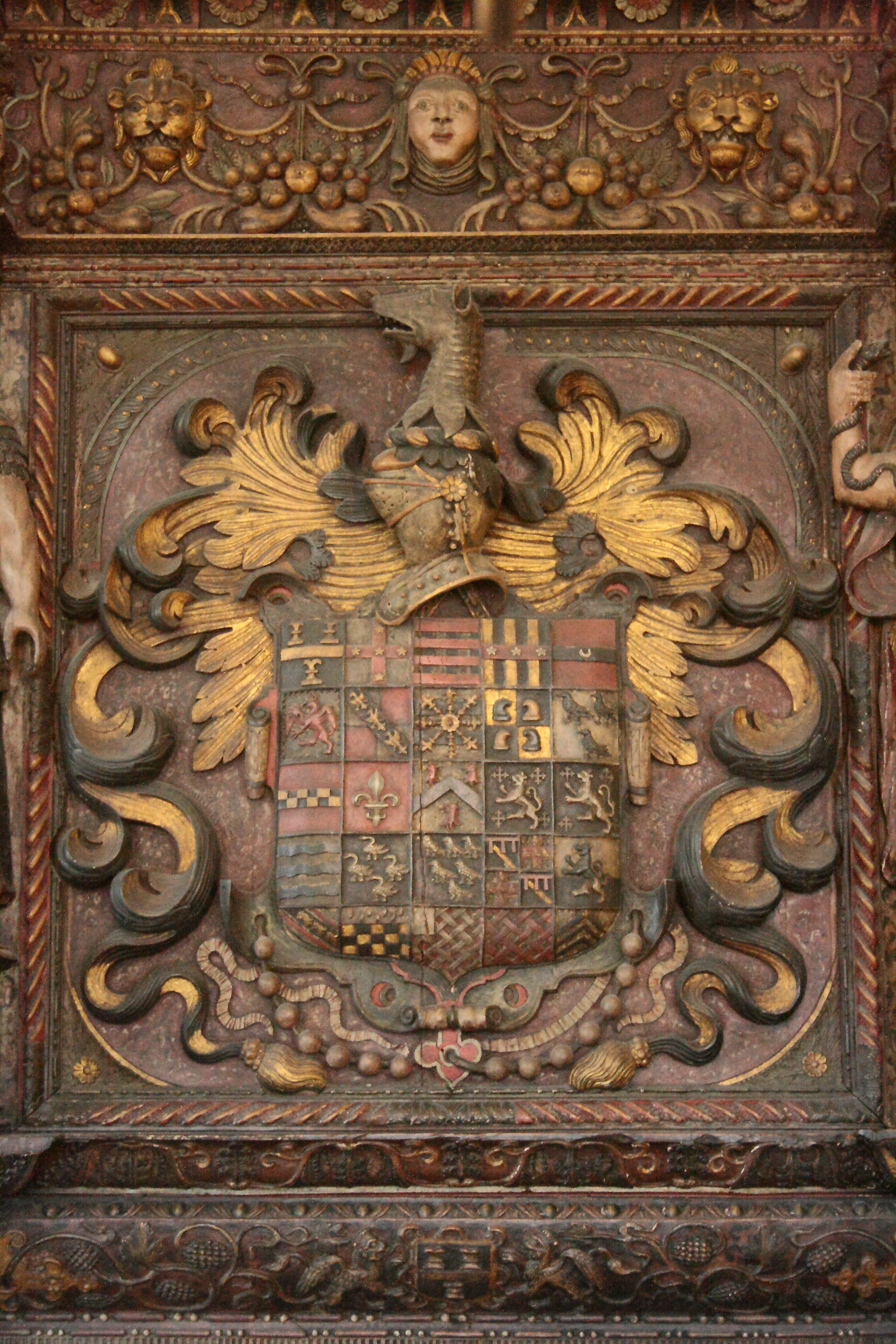
Achievement in the center of the overmantel of the Rotherwas Room. The achievement includes 25 family seals, and is of painted oak.

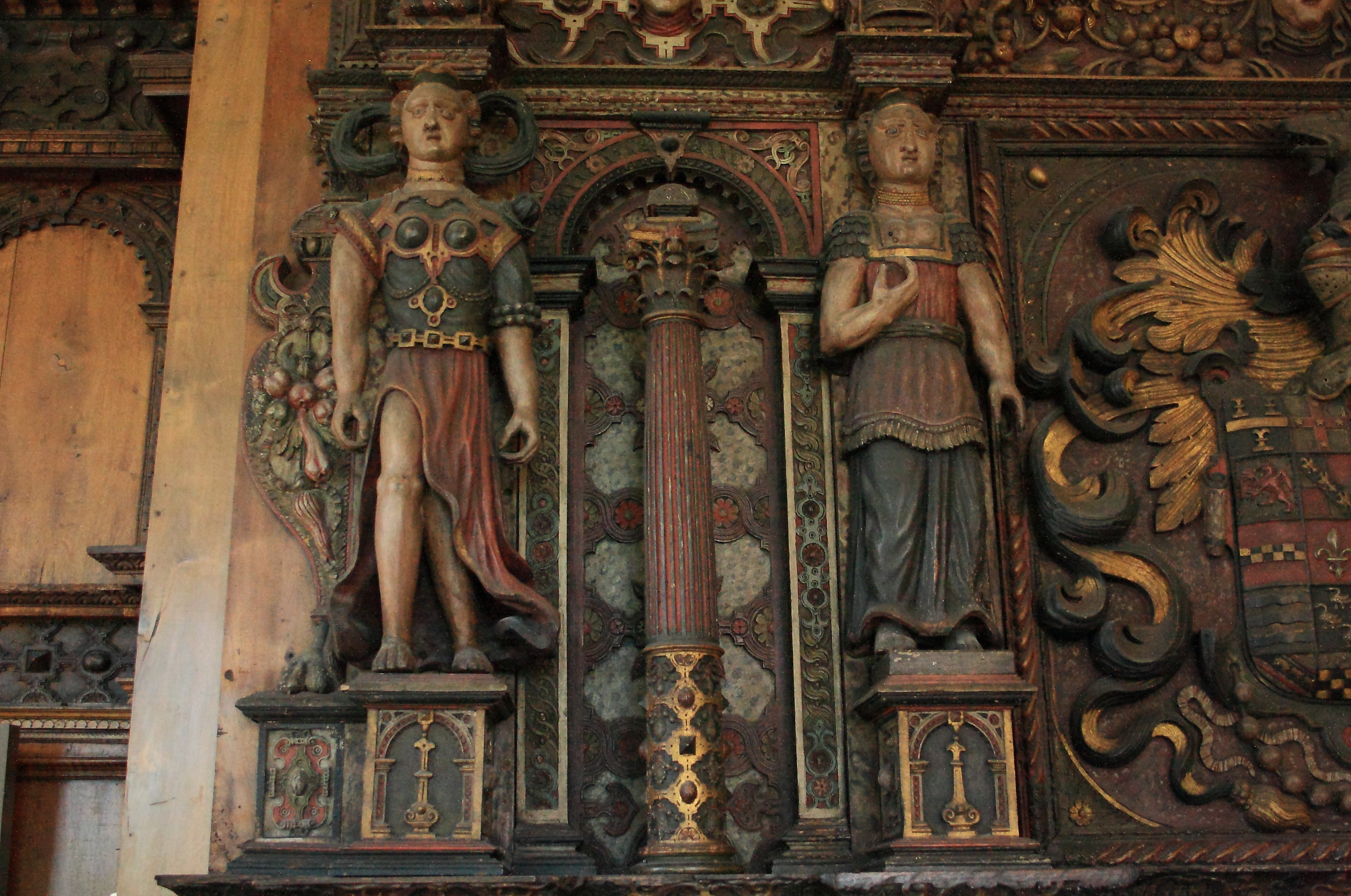
Two of the Cardinal Virtues in the overmantel of the Rotherwas Room. Justice (left) and Temperance (right). Justice originally carried scales, while Temperance held water or wine.

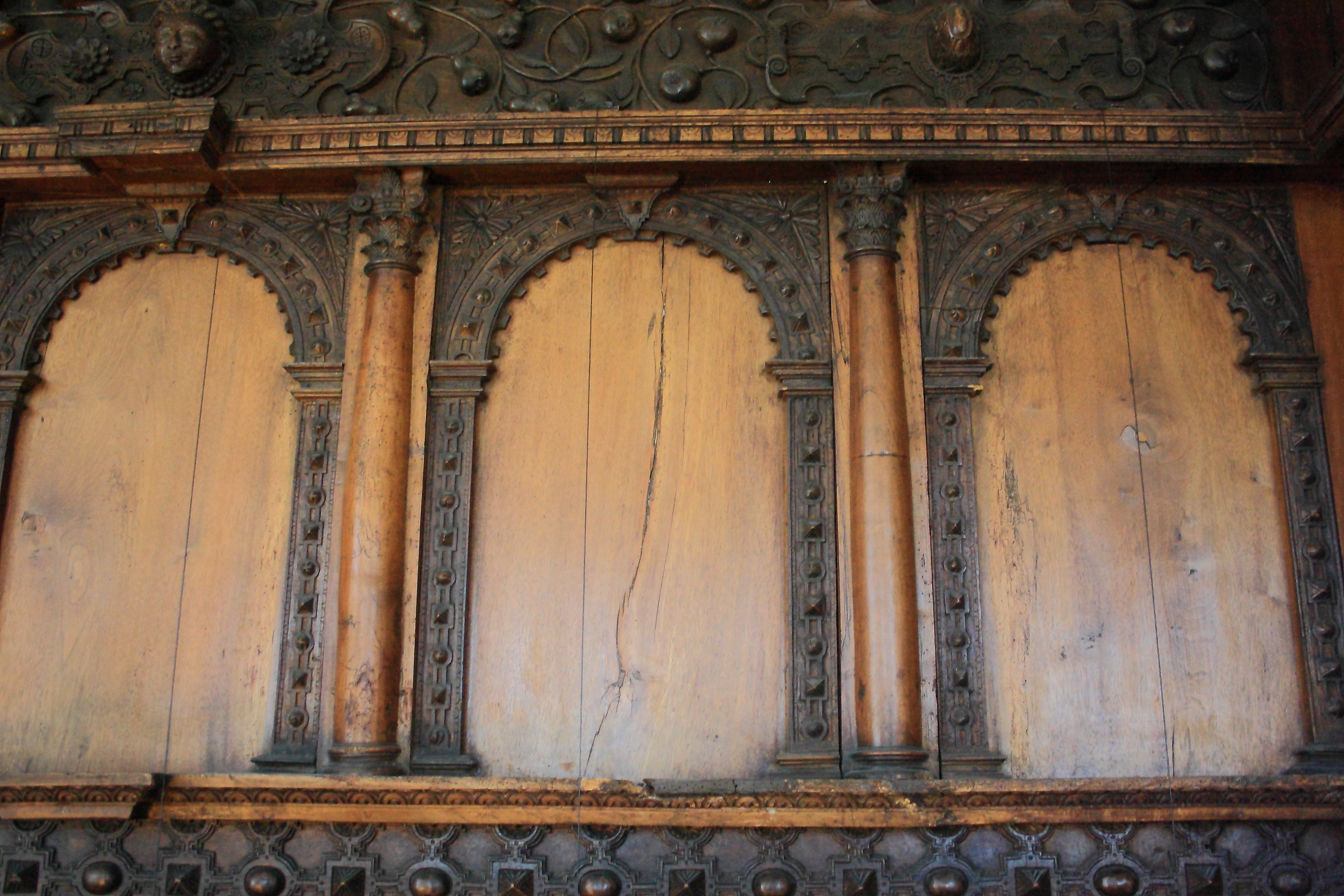
Upper panelling in the Rotherwas Room. The arcade is repeated throughout most of the upper panelling, around the whole room. Arches become less wide as they near the corners of the room, which might have been an attempt to replicate perspective. It is made of walnut.

In seventeenth-century England, the ground floor of country houses had rooms designated for ordinary domestic purposes, while upper floors had more public uses. Thus, the parlors in such houses, including the Rotherwas Room, would have been on the ground floor of the house and most likely near the kitchen. In 1678, Thomas Blount described the Rotherwas Room as a "fair parlour full of coats-of-arms according to the fashion of the age" and "a [whole] dyning room wainscoted with walnut trees, and on the mantel tree of the chimney 25 coats in one achievement." Large Jacobean country houses in England had at least two parlors adjoining the hall. These were for the summer and the winter, and were commonly used as drawing rooms or private dining rooms. Families at the time would use them to dine privately or informally entertain their guests. Reference to the use of parlors at the time include examples from William Shakespeare's Taming of the Shrew, where Bianca and the widow 'sit conferring by the fire,' and in Sir Philip Sidney's Arcadia, where Kalander brings Palladius 'into the parlour where they used to sup.'

Since the Elizabethan era, the location of the ground floor parlor at the upper end of the hall and near the kitchen provided owners and guests with proximity to service areas. Hence, they could enjoy hot food privately, while their guests were entertained in the great hall. For Elizabethans, private dining was the preferred arrangement and comfort was their priority. However, country homes usually contained a variety of parlors with slightly different functions. While the owners would eat two meals a day in the main parlor, other parlors were sometimes used as sleeping chambers or lounges, as they were used in medieval times.

The function of the Rotherwas Room was also related to its decoration, since oftentimes rooms were decorated according to function and the grandest entertaining rooms had the most opulent ornamentation. By the end of the sixteenth and beginning of the seventeenth century, parlors were often almost as lavishly decorated as the great halls in such houses. Furthermore, the decoration of rooms such as this one provided the owners with an opportunity to display their ancestry and allegiance, as well as their knowledge. Thus, coats of arms were usually seen on top of the fireplace, and classical ornamentation along with symbols and emblems would showcase a family's values and cultivation.

It is now currently installed in the Mead Art Museum, and it is primarily used as a gallery space for the Mead's art collection. It is also used as a space for small events, or as a study space for students. The furniture and the ceiling of the room as it is installed in the museum are not part of the original setup of the room in the Rotherwas Court house.

== Formal qualities ==
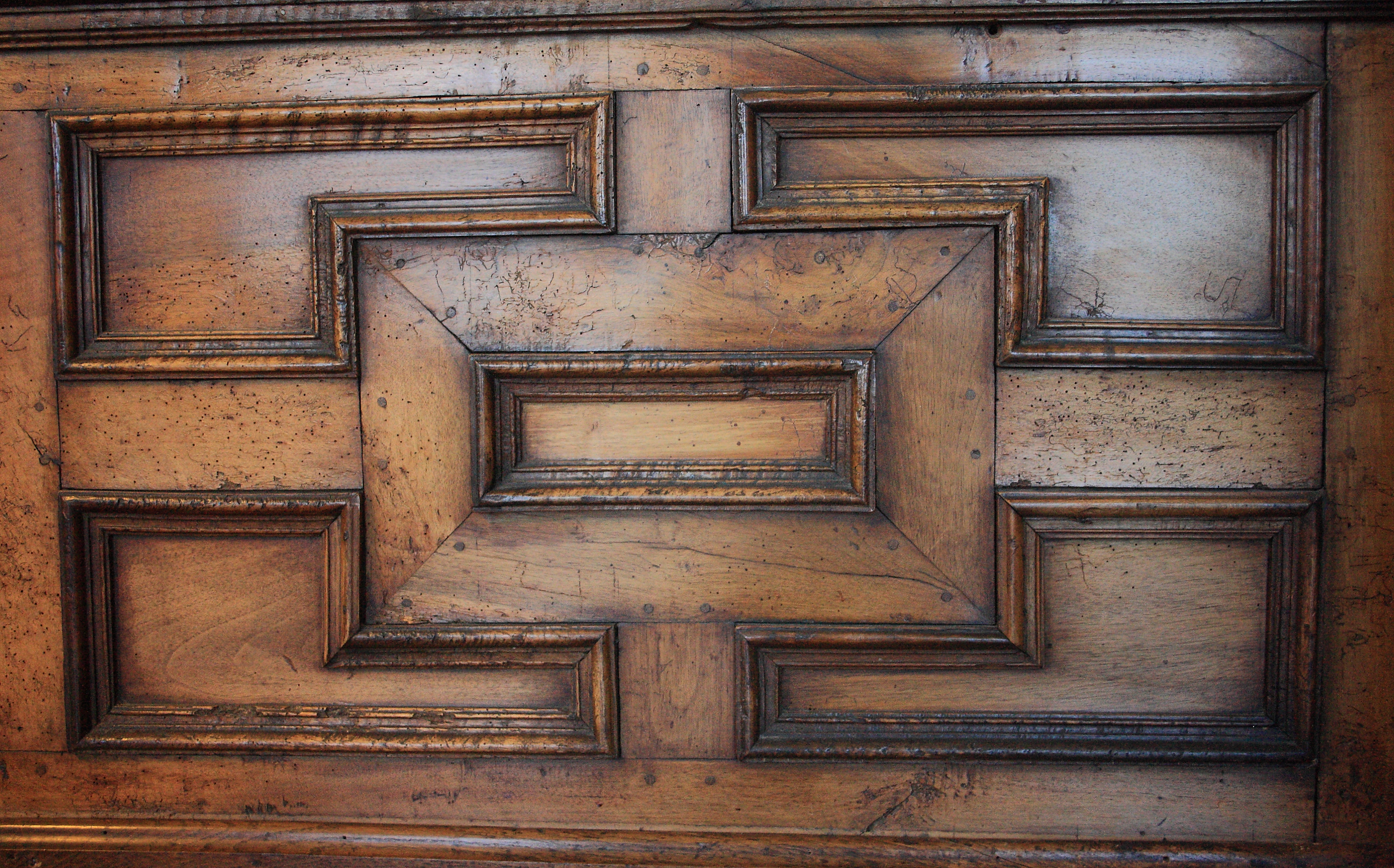
Lower panel of the Rotherwas Room. Made of carved walnut.

The chimneypiece of the Rotherwas Room is of oak, a material widely used in English household construction. Its woodwork is a product of the union of artisanal tradition of the English countryside and an interest in architectural ornamentation arriving from Renaissance Italy. The incorporation of Italian decorative elements into the stylistic vocabulary of English builders was not exceptional at this time. From 1560 to 1610 Italian designs arrived from northern European countries, particularly the Netherlands, in the form of engraving pattern books. These include Sebastiano Serlio's The Five Books of Architecture and Wendel Dietterlin's Architectvra: Von Außtheilung, Symmetria vnd Proportion der Fünff Seulen, as well as treatises such as Vries's "Perspective" and Rivius' "Oder Architectur aller Furnensten Baukunst". The illustrations within these books lacked precision in both form and scale, leaving the craftsman to interpret information according to local tradition and personal expertise. This phenomenon explains the Italian influence on the English style of woodwork that dominates the mantelpiece. The most frequently occurring decorative elements are found in the wainscoting of the Rotherwas Room. Although the identities of the craftsmen are unknown, the figural carvings on the mantel bear similarity to contemporary works by the Huguenot sculptor Maximilian Colt at Robert Cecil, 1st Earl of Salisbury's Hatfield House, which dates from the same period.

The polychrome engraved mantle of the Rotherwas Room bears a complex arrangement of figural representation and plant motifs, including: guilloche, cartouche motifs, decorative scrolls and foliage, gadroon nulling, and lozenges. The central shield of the overmantel bears 25 family seals, including that of the de la Barre family. The shield sprouts flowing acanthus leaves, which are framed by the four Roman virtues: Justice (who originally held scales), Temperance (who held water and wine), Prudence (who held a mirror, book, or dove in addition to the snake), and Fortitude (who still holds a column). Earlier examples of similar work can be seen in the mantel over the fireplace of Great Fulford, Devonshire. The Bodenham coat of arms would have originally featured a background of deep azure. In heraldic terms, the crest consists of a horizontal stripe (called a fess) between three chess rooks, all rendered in gold. The identities of the remaining twenty-three family crests are not all certain, and some may even have been fabricated in order to visually amplify Bodenham's status.

The paneling of the Rotherwas Room is made of walnut, a highly valued imported wood most likely imported from Germany or the Netherlands. While oak was widely used in construction in the Rotherwas estate due to its abundance on the five thousand acre property, large walnut trees did not exist in England prior to 1650 and were rarely used in English paneling if at all. The wainscoting design of lower inner-framed tiers and upper-arcaded panels divided by pilasters and capitals is extremely similar to that of Billesley Manor, Warwickshire and Carbrook Hall, near Sheffield. According to Charles Bodenham, the two doors cut out of the paneling were added in 1611 and 1732 respectively.

== Houses with similar rooms ==
- The Red Lodge, Bristol
- Canons Ashby, Northamptonshire
- Houghton House
- Theobalds House, Cedars Park
- Hatfield House, Hertfordshire
- Longleat House, Wiltshire
- Billesley Manor, Warwickshire
- Carbrook Hall, near Sheffield
- Great Fulford, Devonshire
