= Mead Art Museum =

Art museum in Amherst, Massachusetts

Coordinates: 42.3709°N 72.5155°W

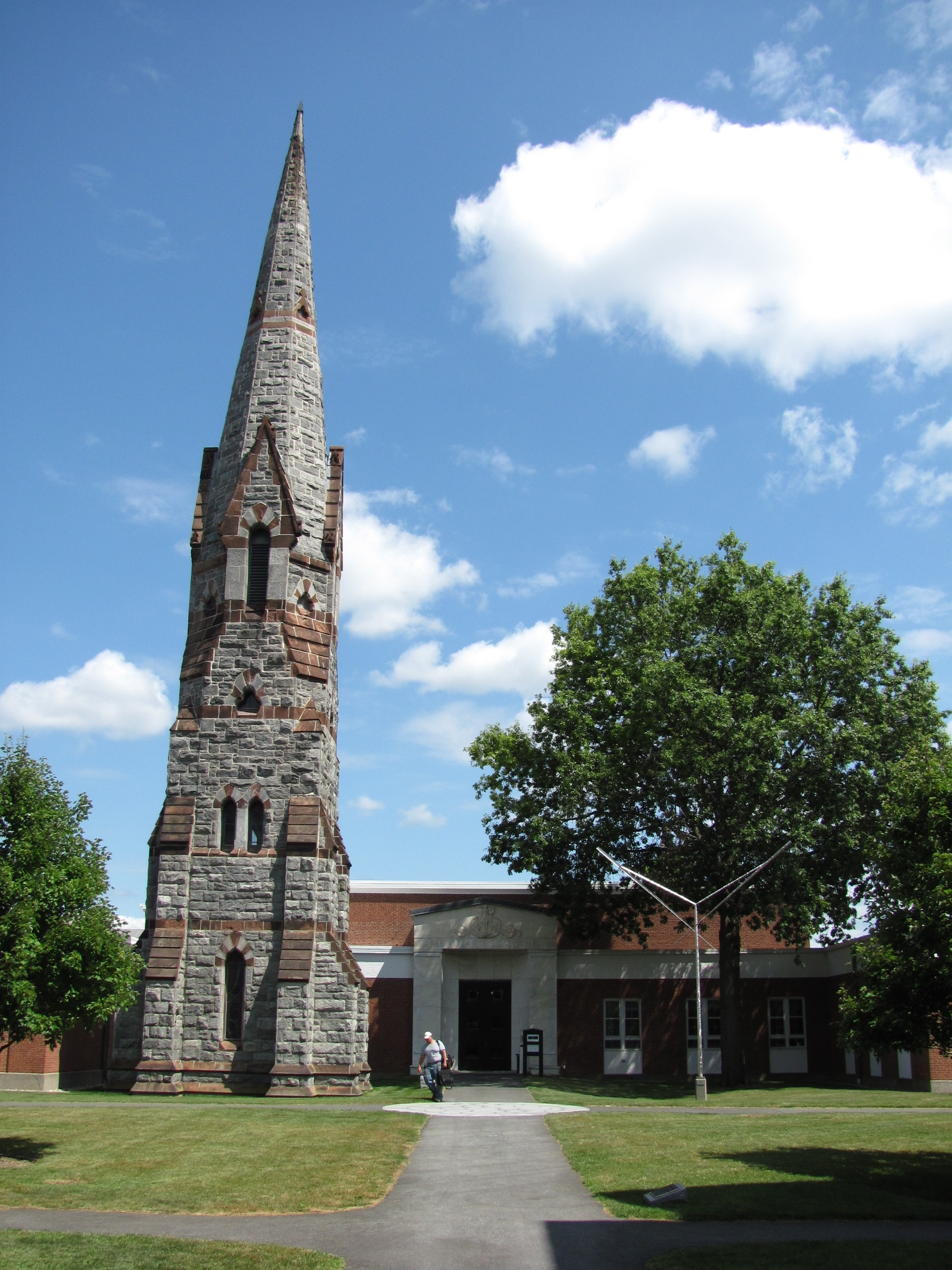
Stearns Steeple and the Mead Art Building

Mead Art Museum houses the fine art collection of Amherst College in Amherst, Massachusetts, US. Opened in 1949, the building is named after architect William Rutherford Mead (class of 1867), of architectural firm McKim, Mead & White. His wife, Olga Kilyeni Mead, left her entire estate to Amherst College. The museum, a member of Museums10, is open to the public free of charge.

== Collection ==
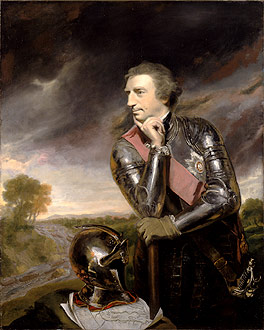
Portrait of Jeffery Amherst by Joshua Reynolds, 1765

The Mead holds the Amherst College art collection, which includes:

- American and European paintings
- Thomas P. Whitney collection of Russian art
- Mexican ceramics
- Tibetan scroll paintings
- 17th century English paneled room
- Ancient Assyrian carvings
- West African sculpture
- Japanese prints

The Mead Art Museum has a collection of approximately 19,000 items. The works in the museum's collection can be searched on the database maintained by the Five College Museums/Historic Deerfield.

== Points of interest ==
=== Assyrian reliefs ===
In 1857, Amherst College acquired panels from the palace of Ashurnasirpal II in Nimrud. In the palace built around 879 B.C.E., the walls of the ceremonial halls and corridors were decorated with monumental relief carvings. The king Ashurnasirpal II is shown in the central panel wearing a fringed robe and royal headdress. In his right hand, he carries a shallow cup used for pouring offerings to the gods, and in his left hand he holds his bow, symbol of his bravery and military might. The central panel is flanked by panels depicting winged protective spirits called genii, or apkallu (as they are termed in the ancient Akkadian language).

The cuneiform inscription, written in a dialect of the Semitic language Akkadian, glorifies the military exploits of King Ashurnasirpal II; his special stature among the gods; and the luxury and grandeur of his building program. Ashurnasirpal II conquered new areas to the west of the Assyrian homeland, beyond the Euphrates River. To emphasize his role as a major powerbroker, he moved the administrative capital from its traditional location at Assur to Kalhu, known today as Nimrud. In addition to his palace, he built temples, administrative buildings, and residences. Population estimates for ancient Kalhu at the time of King Ashurnasirpal run as high as 60,000.

British diplomat and explorer Austen Henry Layard (1817–1894) excavated Nimrud in 1845. Dwight Marsh, an American missionary in Mosul, befriended Layard in 1850 and suggested that educational institutions would benefit greatly from having a few of the panels in their collections. During the early 1850s, panels were selected for and shipped to Amherst, Yale, Bowdoin, Dartmouth, and Middlebury as well as various theological seminaries. Amherst College's third president Edward Hitchcock obtained reliefs for Amherst. The twelve-inch thick reliefs were shaved down to about four inches and then cut into squares for easier transport. The total weight of the reliefs is approximately 2 tonnes. They were transported from Nimrud to eastern Mediterranean ports, and then shipped to the United States. When the panels reached Amherst College they were first displayed in the library, but soon were moved to the purpose-built “Nineveh Gallery” attached to the Octagon.

=== Rotherwas Room ===
The Rotherwas Room is an English Jacobean-style room currently in the Mead Art Museum, in Amherst College.

It was originally installed in the estate of the Bodenham family called Rotherwas Court, in Herefordshire, England, as part of the country house where the family lived. It was commissioned by Sir Roger Bodenham sometime after 1600 and completed in 1611. Some of the room's most prominent aspects include a carved oak mantelpiece and walnut wall panelling. The room originally functioned as a parlor, where families would dine privately or entertain guests informally.

In 1945, Herbert L. Pratt bequeathed the room to the college. It had been previously installed in his Neo-Jacobean House "The Braes," in Glen Cove, Long Island. Although the wall panelling and the mantelpiece of the original room remain, no specific records of the furniture or the ceiling design of this room in the original Rotherwas Court house have been found.

== Programs ==
The Mead hosts free programs throughout the academic school year for the Amherst College and Pioneer Valley community. Regular events include exhibition openings, Saturday student-led tours, Study At the Mead during Finals and Midterms Weeks with food and desks in the galleries, and Community Day, with artmaking and tours. The Mead regularly updates the Mead website, the Mead Facebook page, and the Mead Instagram with the latest events.

== See also ==
- List of museums in the United States
