= New Albany Hotel =

- U.S. National Register of Historic Places
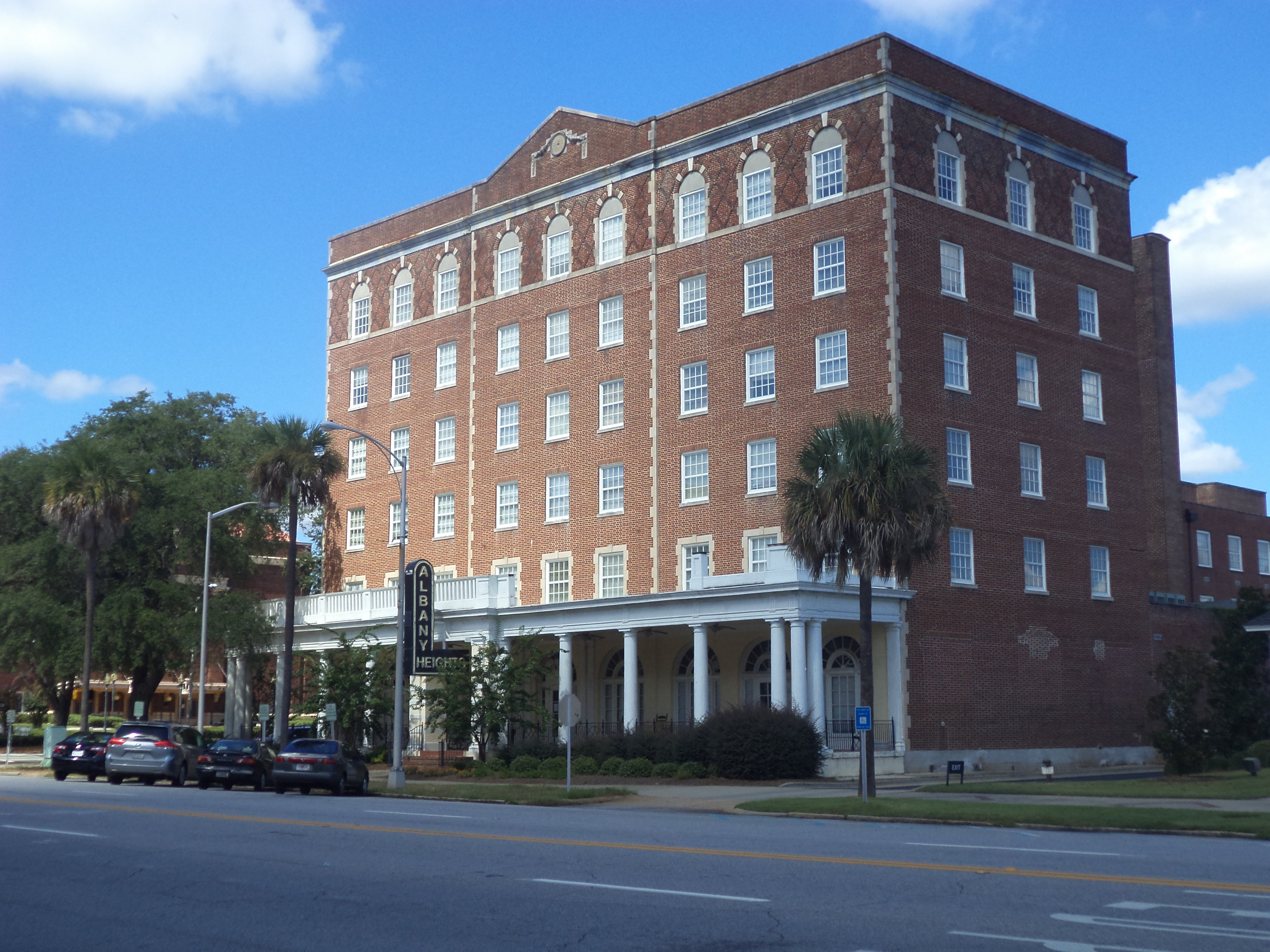

- Location within Georgia Location within the United States
- Location: 245 Pine St., Albany, Georgia
- Coordinates: 31°34′43″N 84°9′12″W
- Area: 0.5 acres (0.20 ha)
- Built: 1925
- Built by: Silverton Construction Co.
- Architect: Raymond C. Snow
- Architectural style: Georgian Revival
- NRHP reference No.: 82002405
- Added to NRHP: June 17, 1982

New Albany Hotel is a historic hotel in Albany, Georgia added to the National Register of Historic Places in 1982. It is now being used as an apartment complex known as The Flats @ 249. It was previously being used as a senior living facility known as Albany Heights. It is located at 249 Pine Avenue. Sam Farkas, a World War II hero, was the hotel's manager.

Built in 1925, it a six-story Georgian Revival-style building. It is constructed of terra cotta blocks dressed with brick, upon a concrete and steel frame. Tapestry brick, in Flemish bond, sheathes the first five floors; Dutch Cross bond brick veneer sheathes the sixth floor. It was designed by Atlanta architect Raymond C. Snow.

It was deemed significant as "a good example of the early-twentieth century Georgian Revival-style commercial buildings found in small Georgia cities and as one of several Georgian Revival-style buildings built in Albany during this period. In terms of commerce, the hotel is significant as one of two major hotels built in Albany during the 1920's to accommodate travel needs generated by the railroads. In terms of local history, the hotel was a center of Albany social life during the 1920's and 1930's."

== See also ==
- Sam Farkas House
- National Register of Historic Places listings in Dougherty County, Georgia
