= Samuel Farkas House =

Historic house in Georgia, United States

- U.S. National Register of Historic Places
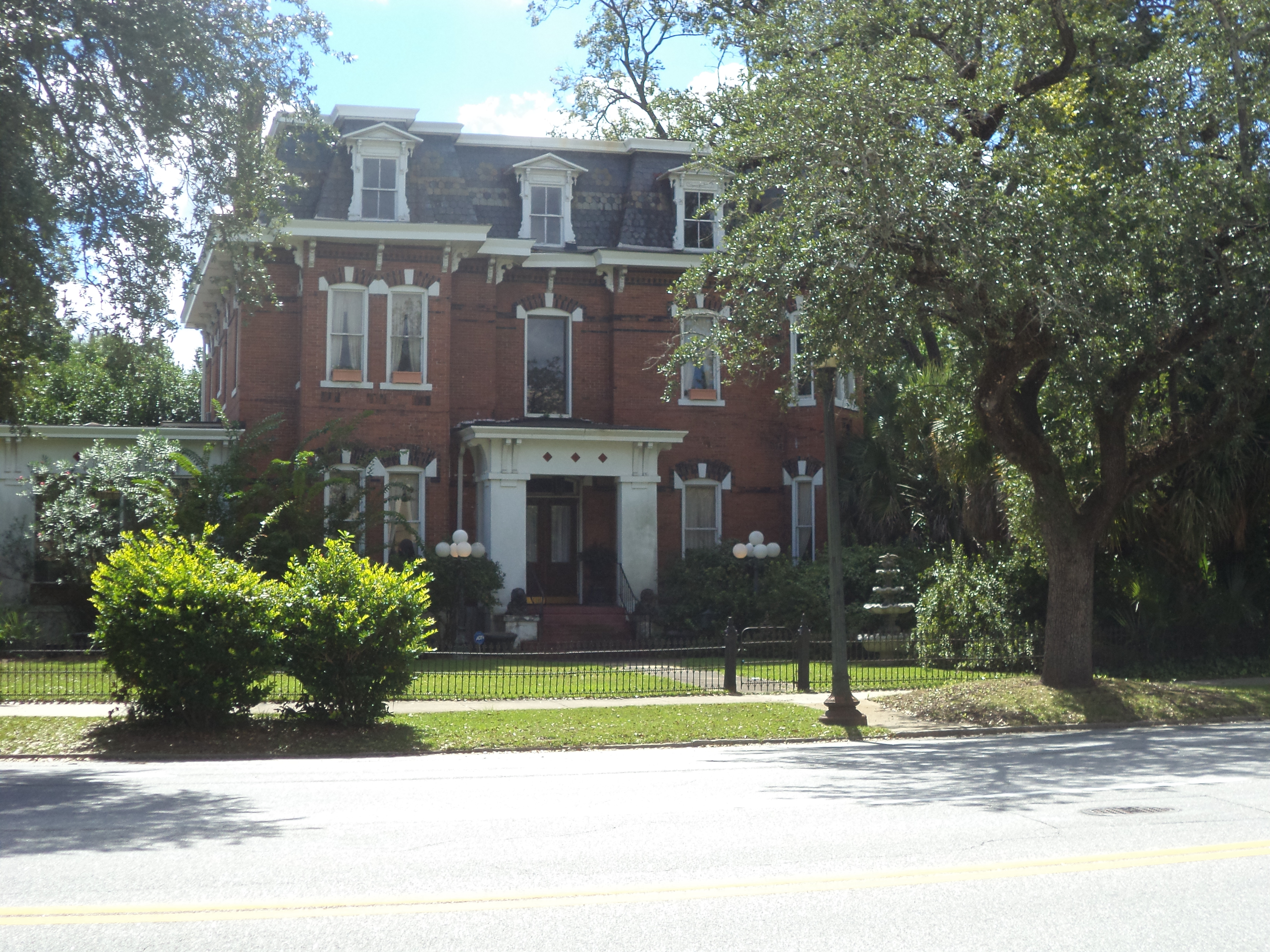

- Location within Georgia Location within the United States
- Location: 328 W. Broad Ave., Albany, Georgia
- Coordinates: 31°34′35″N 84°9′18″W
- Area: 1 acre (0.40 ha)
- Built: 1887
- Architectural style: Second Empire
- NRHP reference No.: 77000419
- Added to NRHP: November 9, 1977

The Samuel Farkas House is a historic residence in Albany, Georgia. It was added to the National Register of Historic Places on November 9, 1977. It is located at 328 West Broad Avenue.

Samuel Farkas (October 25, 1921 - December 30, 2012) was a war hero in World War II and part of the family that operated the New Albany Hotel. He hired Ray Charles to give a performance on piano in the hotel's basement Continental Room.

== See also ==
- National Register of Historic Places listings in Dougherty County, Georgia
