= Arcade Building (Columbia, South Carolina) =

- U.S. National Register of Historic Places
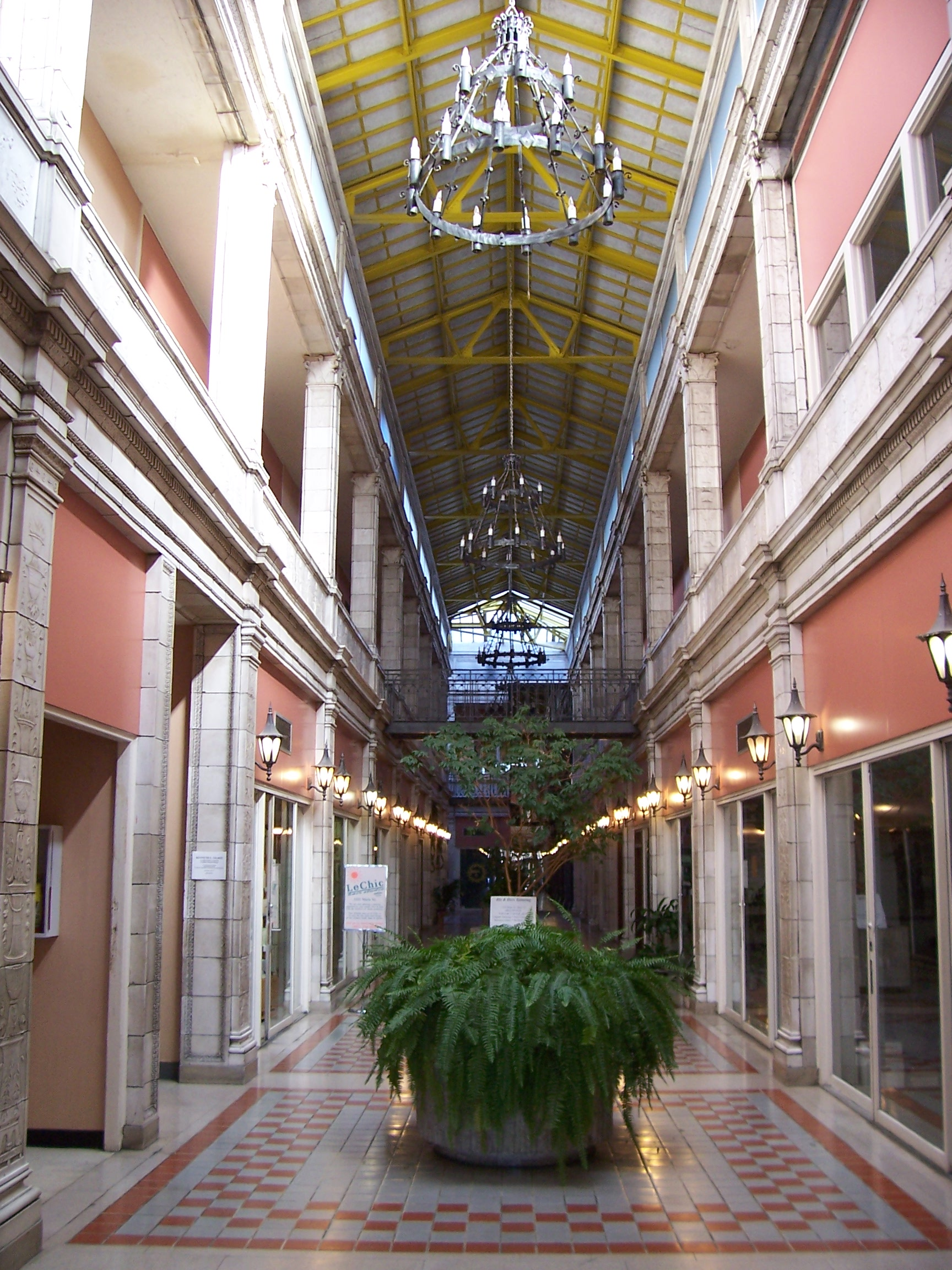
- The interior of the Arcade Building, viewed from the Main Street entrance

- Location within South Carolina Location within the United States
- Location: 1332 Main St. Columbia, South Carolina
- Coordinates: 34°0′12″N 81°2′4″W
- Area: .07 acres (0.028 ha)
- Built: 1912
- Architect: James Brite
- Architectural style: second Renaissance Revival
- NRHP reference No.: 82001525
- Added to NRHP: November 17, 1982

The Arcade Building is a historic enclosed arcade in Columbia, South Carolina that was added to the National Register of Historic Places on November 17, 1982.

== Architecture and history ==
The Arcade Building was constructed in 1912 by the Equitable Real Estate Company, and is reported to have cost 200,000 dollars ($6.67 million today). There are two identical terra cotta façades that face Main and Washington streets in an "L" shape. The Arcade Building has two stories, plus a basement. Both floors have five bays.
