= National Register of Historic Places listings in Dougherty County, Georgia =

Map of Georgia highlighting Dougherty County

This is a list of properties and districts in Dougherty County, Georgia that are listed on the National Register of Historic Places (NRHP).

This National Park Service list is complete through NPS recent listings posted May 1, 2026.

== Current listings ==
	Name on the Register	Image	Date listed	Location	City or town	Description
1	Albany District Pecan Growers' Exchange	Albany District Pecan Growers' Exchange	May 10, 1984 (#84000979)	211-213 Roosevelt Ave. 31°34′53″N 84°09′06″W	Albany	
2	Albany Housefurnishing Company	Albany Housefurnishing Company	June 17, 1982 (#82002402)	226 W. Broad Ave. 31°34′35″N 84°09′09″W	Albany	
3	Albany Railroad Depot Historic District	Albany Railroad Depot Historic District	May 20, 1982 (#82002403)	E. Roosevelt Ave. 31°34′55″N 84°09′00″W	Albany	
4	Albany Theatre	Albany Theatre	August 21, 2006 (#06000733)	107 N. Jackson St. 31°34′37″N 84°09′14″W	Albany	
5	Bridge House	Bridge House	November 19, 1974 (#74000672)	112 N. Front St. 31°34′40″N 84°08′56″W	Albany	
6	Carnegie Library of Albany	Carnegie Library of Albany	July 15, 1982 (#82002404)	215 N. Jackson St. 31°34′44″N 84°09′14″W	Albany	
7	John A. Davis House	John A. Davis House	October 16, 1980 (#80001014)	514 Pine Ave. 31°34′41″N 84°09′38″W	Albany	
8	Davis-Exchange Bank Building	Davis-Exchange Bank Building	February 23, 1984 (#84000981)	100-102 N. Washington St. 31°34′37″N 84°09′04″W	Albany	
9	Downtown Albany Commercial Historic District	Downtown Albany Commercial Historic District	July 15, 2025 (#100012022)	The district is roughly bound by Oglethorpe Alley on the south, Front Street on the east. Roosevelt Avenue on the north, and Jefferson Street on the west. 31°34′42″N 84°09′13″W	Albany	
10	Samuel Farkas House	Samuel Farkas House	November 9, 1977 (#77000419)	328 W. Broad Ave. 31°34′35″N 84°09′18″W	Albany	
11	Lustron House at 1200 Fifth Avenue	Lustron House at 1200 Fifth Avenue	March 18, 1996 (#96000214)	1200 Fifth Ave. 31°35′34″N 84°10′42″W	Albany	
12	Lustron House at 711 Ninth Avenue	Lustron House at 711 Ninth Avenue	March 18, 1996 (#96000213)	711 Ninth Ave. 31°35′53″N 84°10′00″W	Albany	Coordinates given are on the wrong block (a block to the south)
13	Mount Zion Baptist Church	Mount Zion Baptist Church	August 10, 1995 (#95000911)	328 W. Whitney Ave. 31°34′18″N 84°09′20″W	Albany	
14	Municipal Auditorium	Municipal Auditorium	June 25, 1974 (#74000673)	301 Pine Ave. 31°34′43″N 84°09′16″W	Albany	
15	New Albany Hotel	New Albany Hotel	June 17, 1982 (#82002405)	245 Pine St. 31°34′49″N 84°09′05″W	Albany	
16	Old St. Teresa's Catholic Church	Old St. Teresa's Catholic Church	April 1, 1975 (#75000589)	313 Residence Ave. 31°34′59″N 84°09′17″W	Albany	
17	Rosenberg Brothers Department Store	Rosenberg Brothers Department Store	August 19, 1982 (#82002406)	126 N. Washington St. 31°34′41″N 84°09′04″W	Albany	Albany Herald Headquarters
18	W. E. Smith House	W. E. Smith House	August 30, 1977 (#77000420)	516 Flint Ave. 31°34′46″N 84°09′37″W	Albany	First brick house in Albany
19	St. Nicholas Hotel	St. Nicholas Hotel	December 19, 1991 (#91001851)	141 Flint Ave., 300-310 Washington St. 31°34′48″N 84°09′05″W	Albany	
20	Tift Park	Tift Park	November 15, 1993 (#93001179)	Bounded by N. Jefferson St., 5th Ave., 7th Ave. and Palmyra Rd. 31°35′38″N 84°09′31″W	Albany	
21	U.S. Post Office and Courthouse	U.S. Post Office and Courthouse	June 22, 1979 (#79003105)	345 W. Broad Ave. 31°34′38″N 84°09′20″W	Albany	
22	Union Station Depot	Union Station Depot	February 13, 1975 (#75000590)	Roosevelt Ave. and N. Front St. 31°34′54″N 84°08′59″W	Albany	
