= Albany Theatre (Albany, Georgia) =

- U.S. National Register of Historic Places
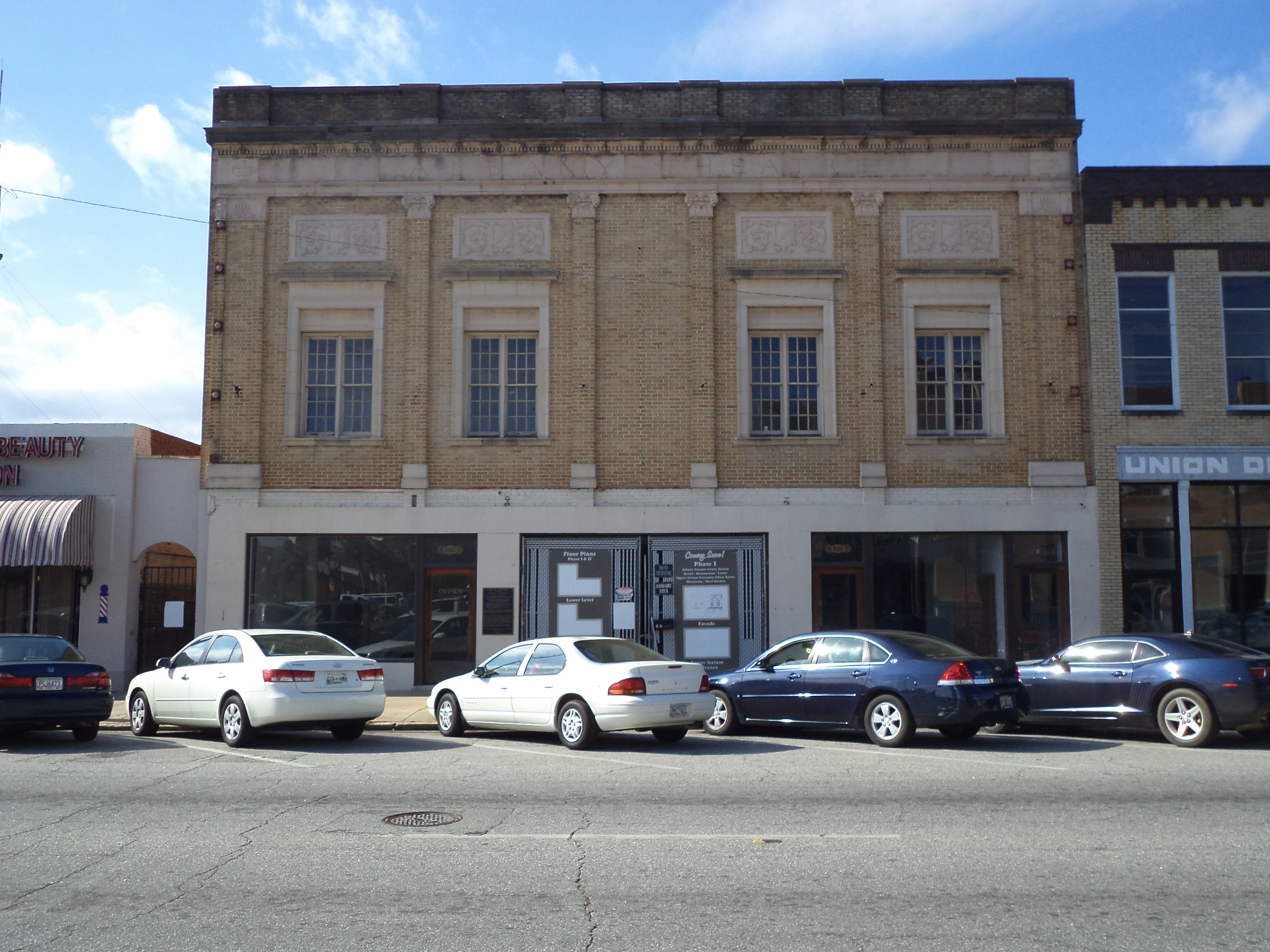

- Location within Georgia Location within the United States
- Location: 107 N. Jackson St., Albany, Georgia
- Coordinates: 31°34′37″N 84°9′14″W
- Area: less than one acre
- Built: 1927
- Architect: Benjamin, Roy A.
- Architectural style: Classical Revival
- NRHP reference No.: 06000733
- Added to NRHP: August 21, 2006

Albany Theatre is a historic theater in Albany, Georgia, United States. It opened in 1927 and was added to the National Register of Historic Places on August 21, 2006. The building, no longer in operation as a theatre, is located at 107 North Jackson Street.

== History ==
The Albany Theatre was built by the estate of Samuel Farkas and opened on September 12, 1927. It was the first steel-framed building in Albany and was designed by Roy A. Benjamin.

The theater's first production featured H. L. Tallman on the Robert Morton Organ Company pipe organ (Opus 2304) along with Ralph Barnes and his Albany Theatre Orchestra accompanying The Magic Flame starring Ronald Colman and Vilma Bánky. Homer W. McCallon was the theater's director. The theater adjusted to films with sound and remained in business until the 1970s.

The theatre was purchased from the Farkas Estate by Oglethorpe Development Group, a minority enterprise which began underwriting a restoration of the theatre as a performing arts center. A 2011 plan was to convert the theater into an apartment building.

The Theatre caught fire in the early morning hours of January 24, 2018. Investigators believe the fire was started when vagrants living in the building threw a lit cigarette onto the roof and caught trash on fire. One person died of soot and smoke inhalation. Three other people, believed to be living in the building, were rescued.

As of 2018, the Albany-Dougherty Inner City Authority owned the building, and there were no future development plans.

== See also ==
- Theatre Albany
- National Register of Historic Places listings in Dougherty County, Georgia
