= Meridian Exchange Bank =

Historic building in Meridian, Idaho

- U.S. National Register of Historic Places
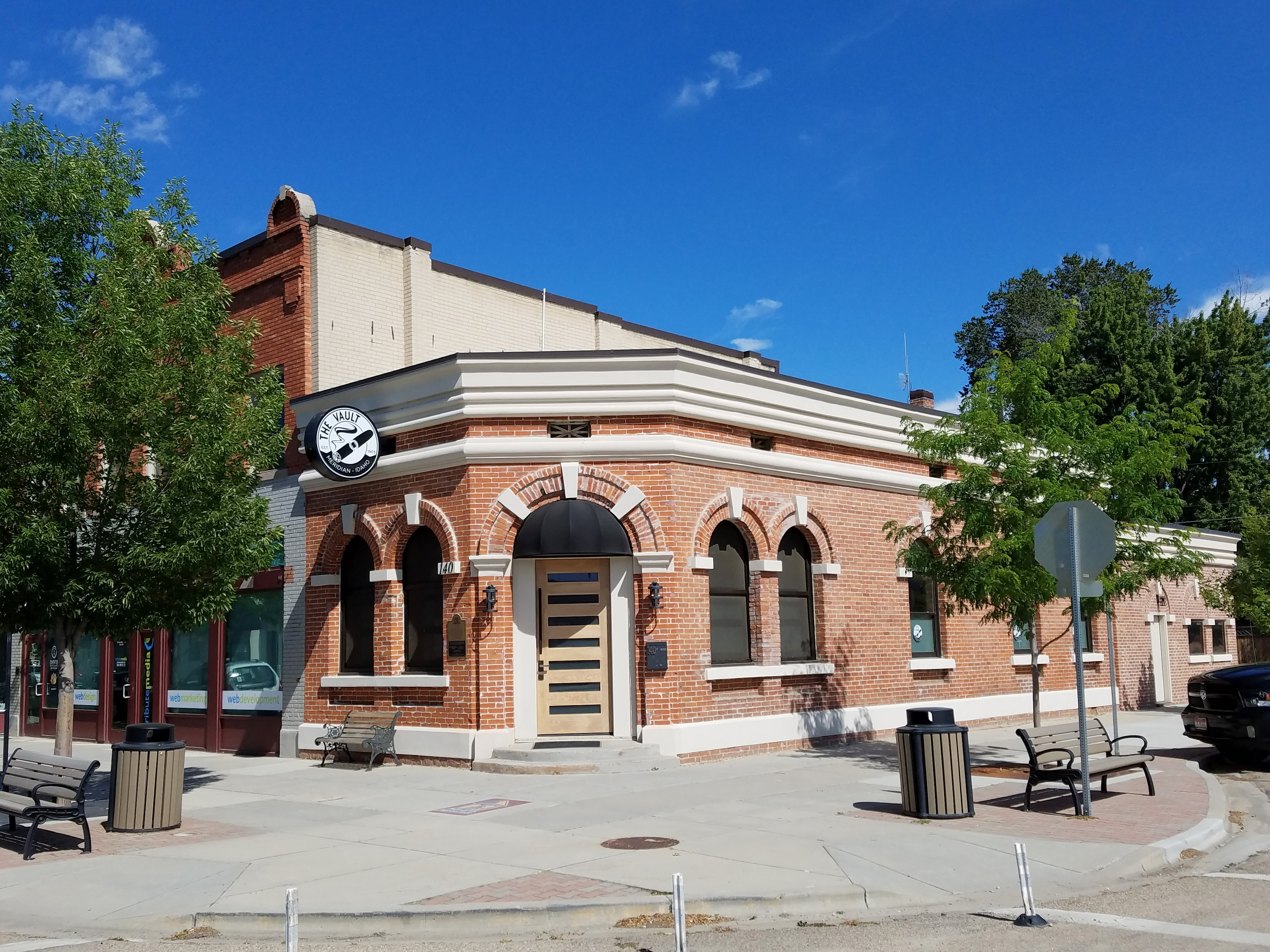

- Location within Idaho Location within the United States
- Location: 109 E. 2nd St., Meridian, Idaho
- Coordinates: 43°36′38″N 116°23′22″W
- Area: less than one acre
- Built: 1906
- Built by: Allen & Barber
- Architect: John E. Tourtellotte & Company
- Architectural style: Renaissance Revival
- MPS: Tourtellotte and Hummel Architecture TR
- NRHP reference No.: 82000223
- Added to NRHP: November 17, 1982

The Meridian Exchange Bank in Meridian, Idaho, was designed by the Boise architectural firm of John E. Tourtellotte & Company and constructed in 1906. Charles F. Hummel may have been the supervising architect. The 2-story, Renaissance Revival building was constructed of brick and sandstone by contractors Allen & Barber, and it featured a corner entry at Idaho Avenue and Second Street. The ground floor entry and a Second Street entry to the second floor both were framed by shallow brick pilasters supporting simple stone capitals. Four corbelled brick chimneys extended above the second floor parapet. The Meridian Exchange Bank and a barbershop occupied the ground floor, and the Independent Telephone Exchange rented the second floor. The building was added to the National Register of Historic Places (NRHP) in 1982.

After its listing on the NRHP, the building was renovated, and it bears little resemblance to its original design by Tourtellotte & Co. The second floor was removed, and a cement cornice was added above the first floor. Window fenestrations were redesigned with arched, keystoned brickwork. The corner entry was retained, although it was redesigned to include an arch and triple keystone. The renovation may have happened while Elite Cleaners occupied the building.

The Vault cigar shop opened in the building in 2014.

== Meridian Exchange Bank ==
Meridian Exchange Bank was organized in 1902 as a branch of Capital State Bank, located in Boise. Vernon T. Craig helped to found the bank and served as an early cashier. Craig sold his bank holdings in 1905 and moved to Emmett, Idaho, where he founded the Bank of Emmett. Craig helped to incorporate the town of Meridian in 1903.

By 1906 Meridian Exchange Bank had outgrown its original location, and the 2-story Tourtellotte & Co. design was constructed. The bank added 75 safe deposit boxes in 1910.

In 1912 Meridian Exchange Bank merged with the Bank of Meridian and formed the First National Bank of Meridian. The bank had vacated the building by 1938, and Elite Cleaners was established at the site.
