= The Braes =

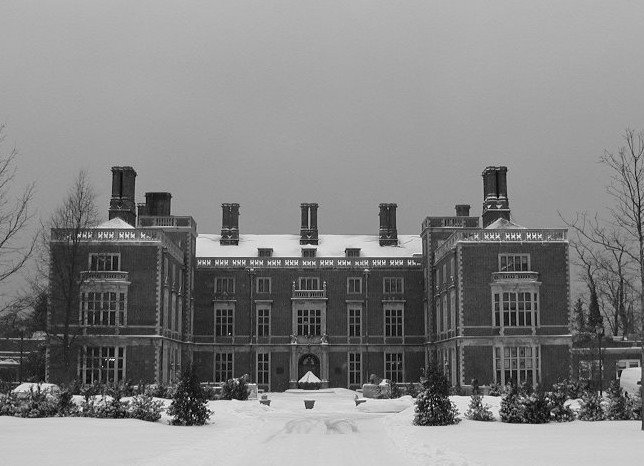
- The Braes
- Interactive map of the The Braes area

General information
- Type: Mansion
- Architectural style: Jacobean
- Location: Glen Cove, New York, United States
- Coordinates: 40°53′04″N 73°38′42″W
- Opened: 1912

Technical details
- Size: 40,000 square feet

Design and construction
- Architect: James Brite

The Braes is a historic Jacobean-style mansion in Glen Cove, New York constructed for Herbert Lee Pratt in 1912. Occupying 40,000 square feet, it is among the top 100 largest houses in the United States. It is the largest of the six Pratt estates on Long Island. Since 1947, it has been home to the Webb Institute of Naval Architecture. The building is situated on 3 terraces above the Long Island Sound.

The Braes was built on an estate known as Dosoris Park, which land was originally purchased by Pratt's father. Herbert and eight of his siblings all built houses here, but The Braes was the largest.

== Original House ==
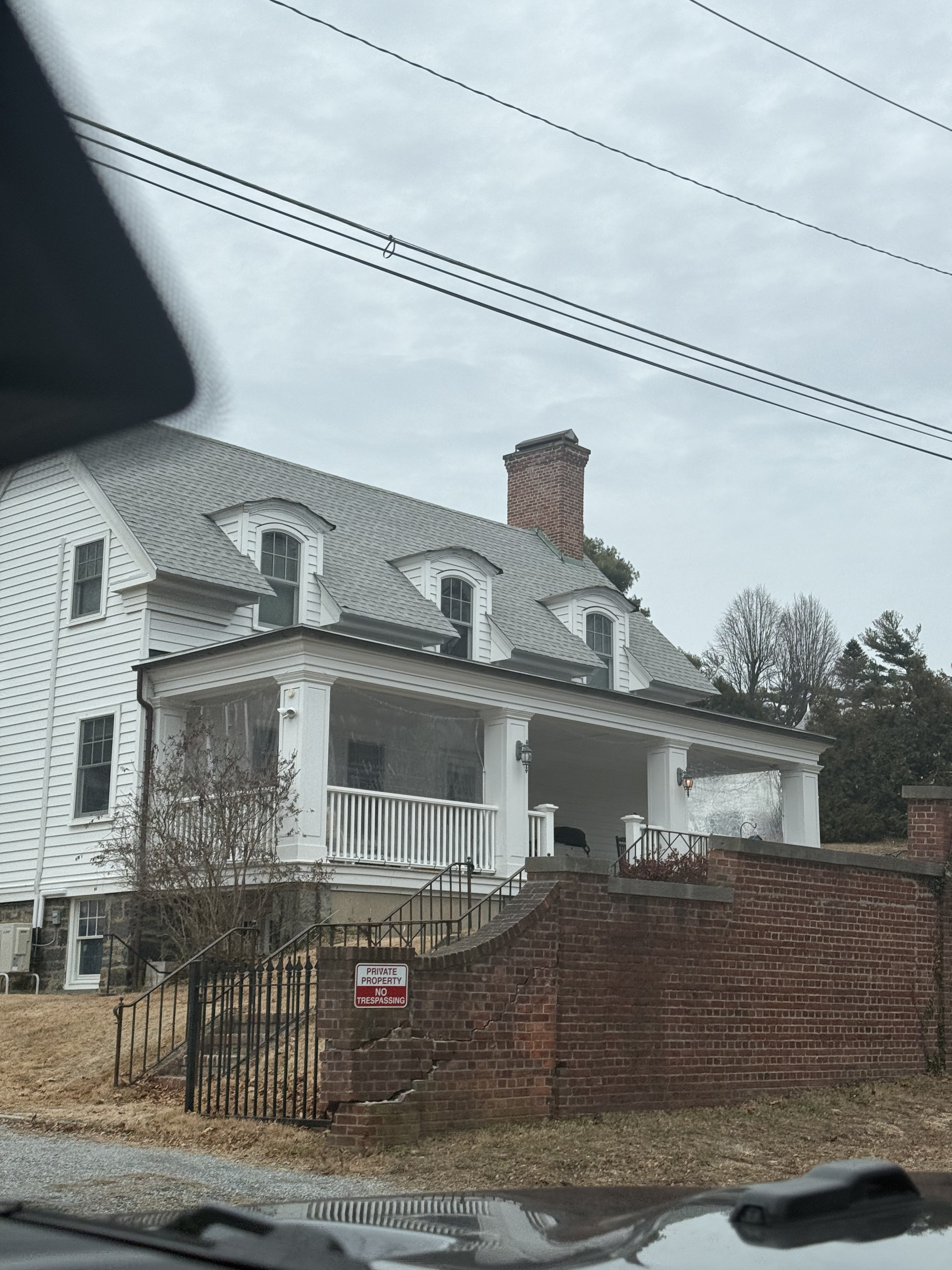
The remaining wing of Herbert L. Pratt's first residence as seen in 2025.

The Braes is the second house to sit on this site. The first house, erraneously referred to as "Dosoris," was of the Georgian revival style. This residence was also built for Pratt in 1902. When Mr. & Mrs Pratt expressed desire to have a new house constructed in 1911, they had most of the previous residence torn down. Both houses were designed by James Brite of the architectural firm of Brite & Bacon.

After The Braes was constructed, the remaining wing from Pratt's first house was moved to the southeast. It has stood there since, and was renamed "White House" after the property was taken over by the Webb Institute in 1947.

== Rotherwas Room ==
Pratt was an avid collector of portraiture. The dining room at The Braes dates from 1611 and was shipped over from England and reassembled within the mansion in 1913. It was salvaged from the Rotherwas Room at Rotherwas Court in Herefordshire, which was then being demolished. In his will, Pratt instructed that the paneling and mantelpiece be given to his alma mater, Amherst College, where in 1949 it was again reassembled and can still be seen at the Mead Art Museum at Amherst.

== Popular culture ==
- The Braes was used as the exterior shots for Wayne Manor in the Batman movies: Batman Forever, Batman & Robin, and The Joker.
- It was also used for Wayne Manor in the television show, Gotham.
- The interior of the building was used in S3E7 of the television show, Royal Pains.
- It was featured in the 2015 television series, Limitless (TV series).
- It was utilized in the 1998 film, Great Expectations (1998 film).
