= Davis–Exchange Bank Building =

- U.S. National Register of Historic Places
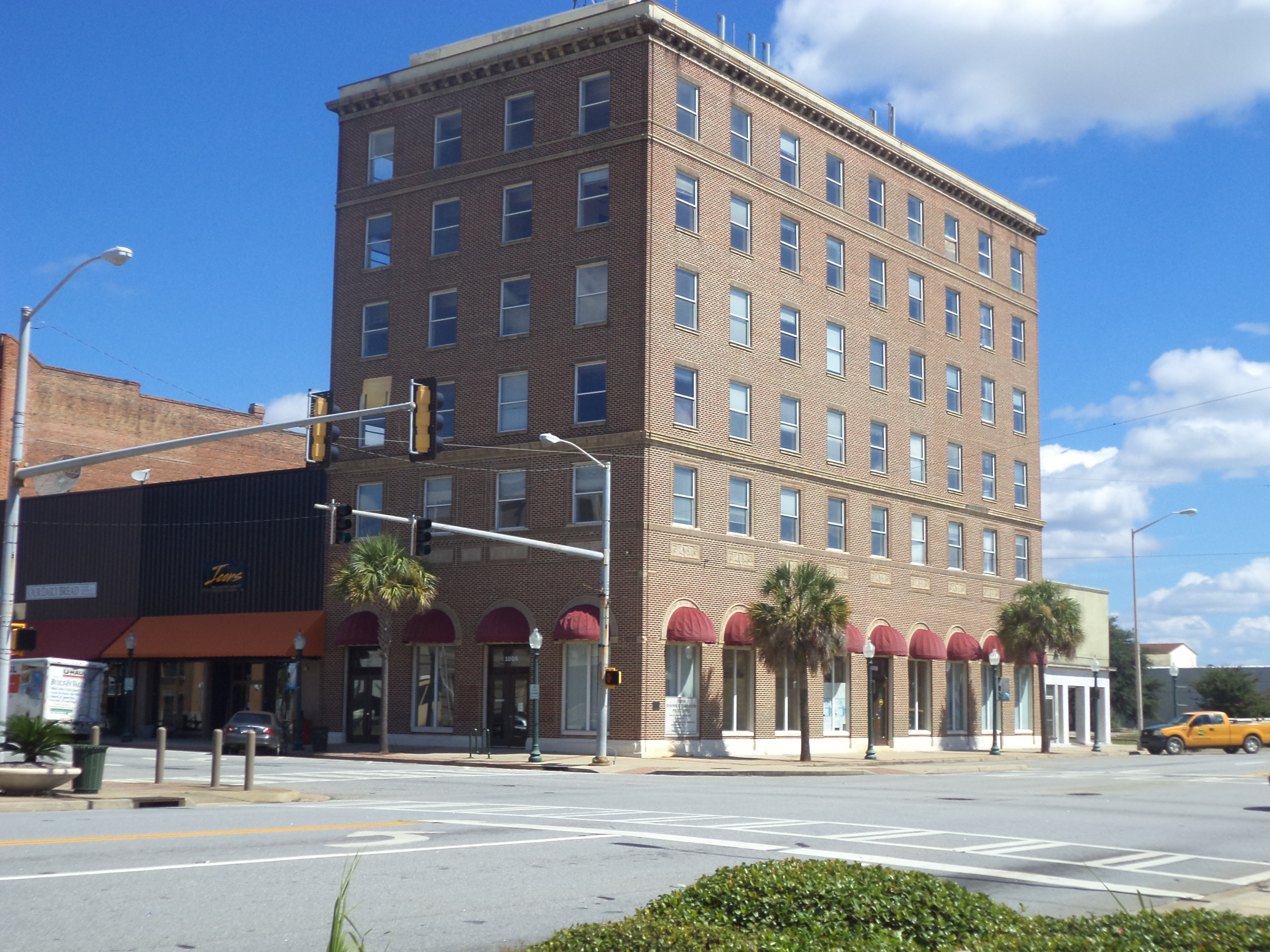

- Location within Georgia
- Location: 100-102 N. Washington St., Albany, Georgia
- Coordinates: 31°34′37″N 84°9′4″W
- Area: less than one acre
- Built: 1919-21
- Architect: J.E.R. Carpenter
- Architectural style: Georgian Revival
- NRHP reference No.: 84000981
- Added to NRHP: February 23, 1984

The Davis–Exchange Bank Building is a historic building in Albany, Georgia. It was built during 1919–21 with six stories, making it the tallest building in Albany upon its completion. It is an example of Beaux Arts architecture and was designed by J.E.R. Carpenter of Tennessee. It was listed on the National Register of Historic Places on February 23, 1984. It is located at 100-102 North Washington Street.

The building was built for the Albany Exchange Bank as a replacement for its original building, which had burned down.

== See also ==
- National Register of Historic Places listings in Dougherty County, Georgia
