= National Loan and Exchange Bank Building =

- U.S. National Register of Historic Places
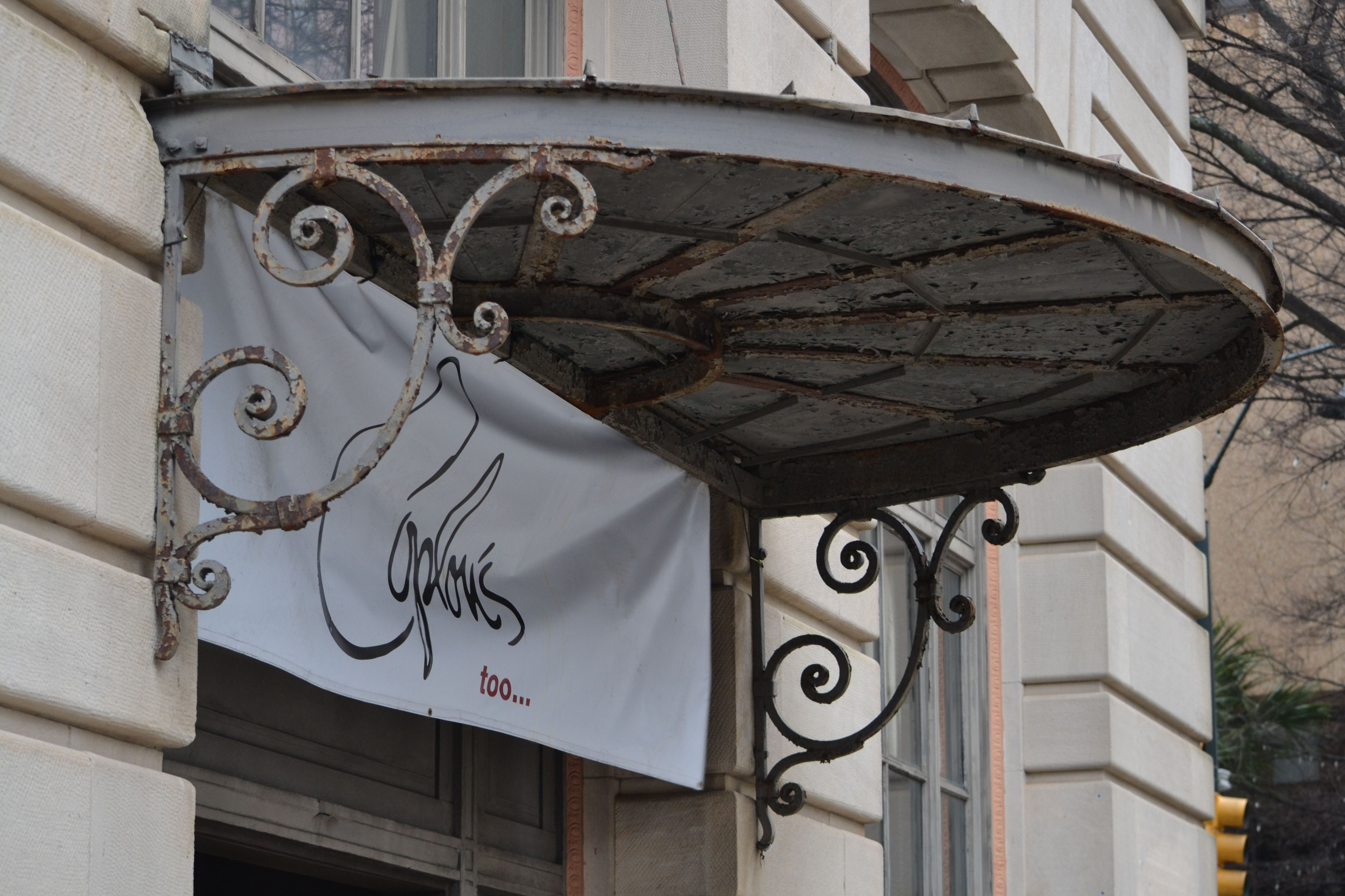

- Location within South Carolina Location within the United States
- Location: 1338 Main St., Columbia, South Carolina
- Coordinates: 34°0′13″N 81°2′5″W
- Area: 0.1 acres (0.040 ha)
- Built: 1903
- Built by: Cain, John
- Architect: Brite, James
- Architectural style: Colonial Revival, Skyscraper, Georgian Revival
- MPS: Columbia MRA
- NRHP reference No.: 79003374
- Added to NRHP: March 2, 1979

National Loan and Exchange Bank Building, also known as the Barringer Building, is a historic bank and office building located at 1338 Main Street, Columbia, South Carolina. It was built in 1903, and is a 12-story, steel frame building faced in brick and stone. It measures 184 feet high and is considered Columbia's first skyscraper. The building was owned by the Barringer Corporation from 1953 until 1974.

It was added to the National Register of Historic Places in 1979.
