= Crocker-McMillin Mansion =

Historic house in Mahwah, New Jersey

- U.S. National Register of Historic Places
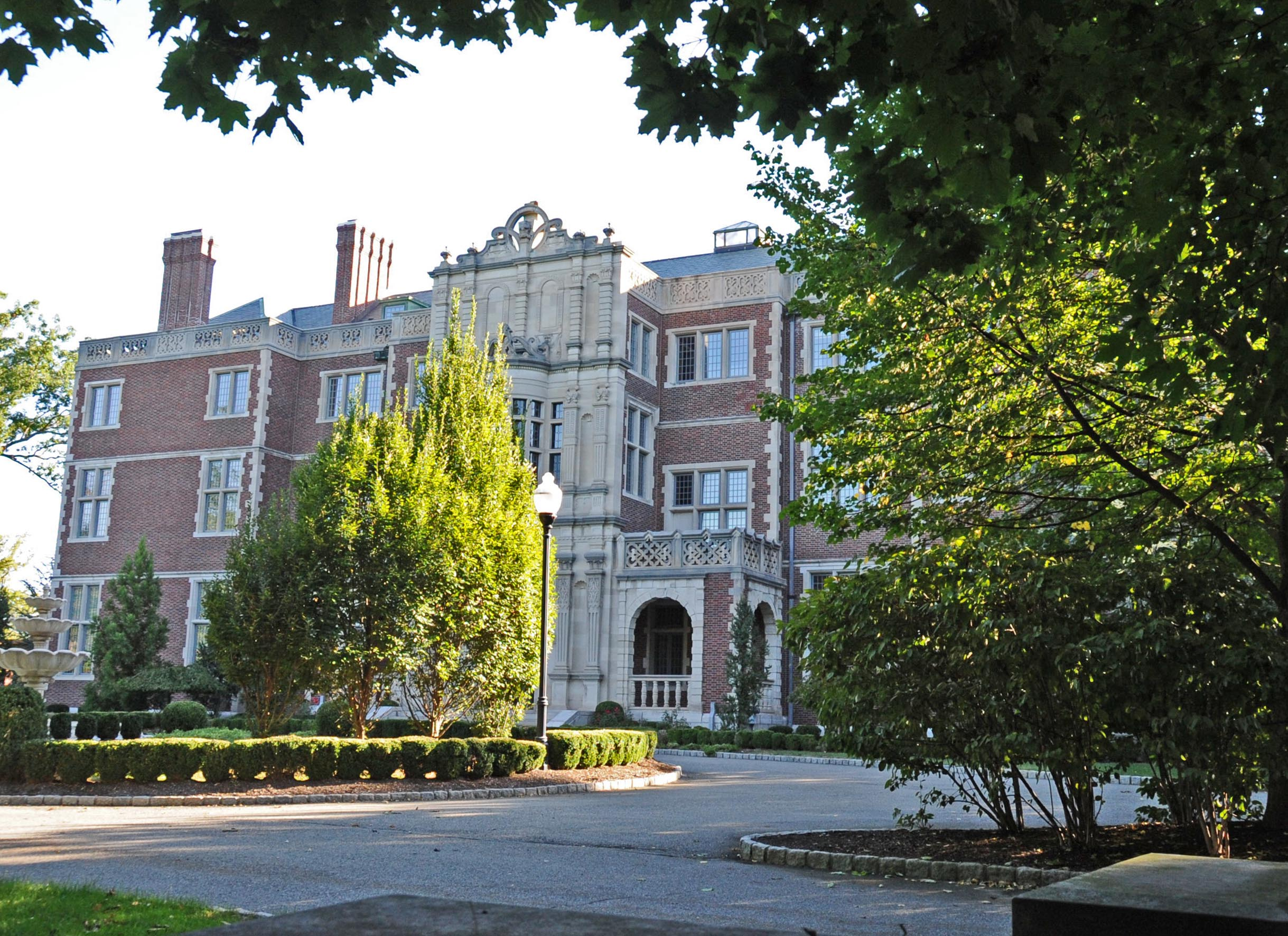
- Front side of the mansion, 2015

- Location within Bergen County, New Jersey Location within New Jersey Location within the United States
- Location: 675 Ramapo Valley Road; Mahwah, New Jersey
- Coordinates: 41°4′20″N 74°11′26″W
- Area: 12.5 acres (5.1 ha)
- Built: 1903–1907
- Architects: James Brite; Fanning & Shaw
- Architectural style: Late Gothic Revival, Jacobean Revival
- NRHP reference No.: 96001562
- Added to NRHP: May 23, 1997

The Crocker-McMillin Mansion (also known as the Crocker Mansion and Darlington) is a historic house in Mahwah, New Jersey. It was built between 1903 and 1907 on the Darling estate for businessman George Crocker. After Crocker died in 1909, the banker Emerson McMillin lived in the 75-room, three-story residence until his death in 1922. From 1927 to 1984, the mansion was occupied by a Catholic institution, the Immaculate Conception Seminary. The property, located at 675 Ramapo Valley Road in Mahwah, is one of New Jersey's historical landmarks. It was listed on the National Register of Historic Places in 1997.

== History ==
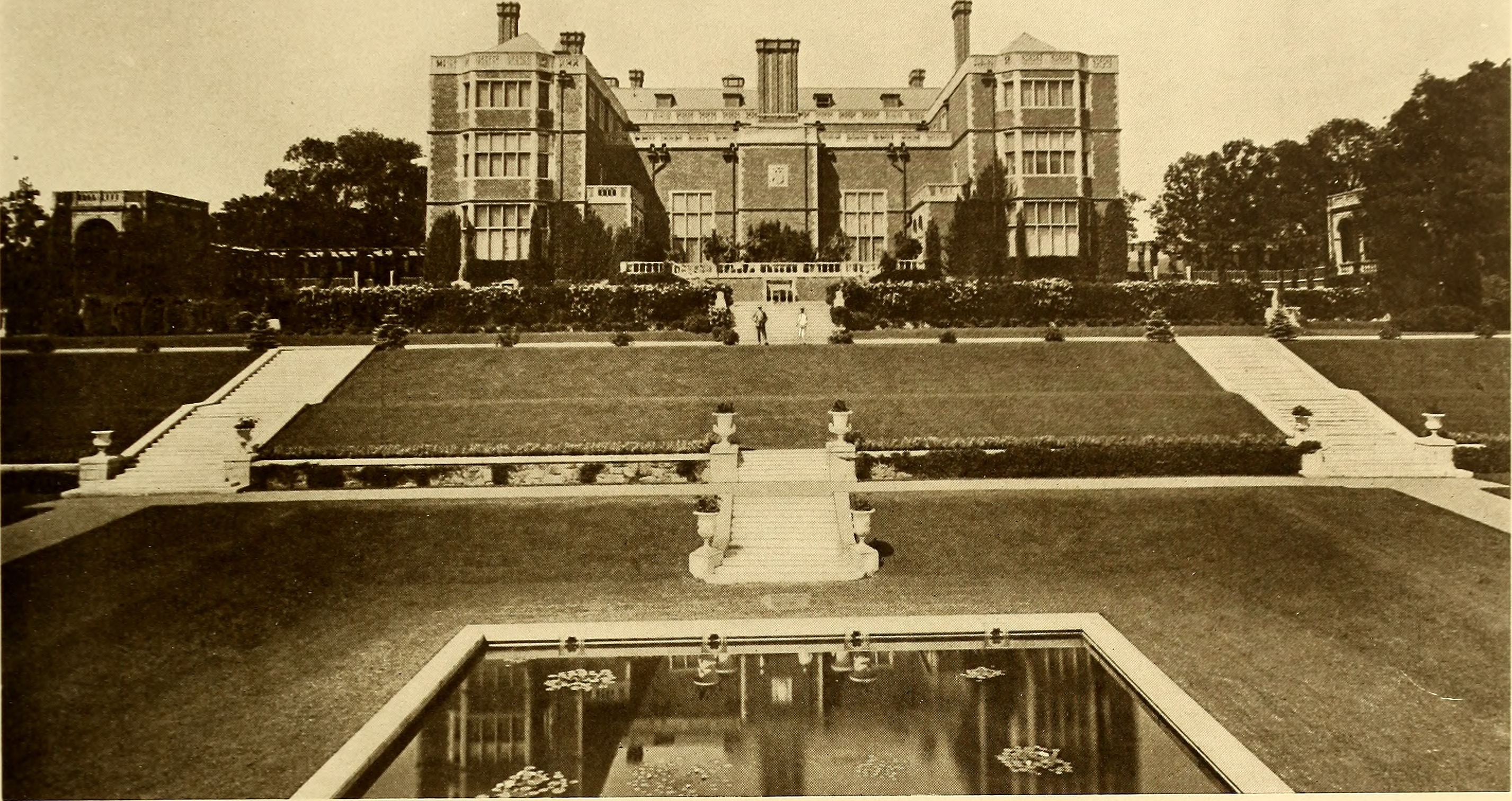
Garden side of the mansion, 1909

=== Mansion on the Darling estate ===
The Darling estate, originally over 1,100 acres, was established by Alfred B. Darling in 1872. The Darlings built a house on the property, as well as a racetrack for horses. The Darling estate was purchased in November 1901 by George Crocker, who described the property as "the finest site for a residence in the country." In response to rumors of the possible purchase, the Ramsey Journal wrote that "the coming of such a man would mean much to our town."

Crocker brought horses to the estate, and early in 1902, he acquired the well-known racehorse King Muscovite. By September 1902, his horses were winning awards. Crocker had 4,000 trout delivered to the property's pond in the spring of 1903 from Plymouth, Massachusetts, and bass were also added. By the spring of 1904, the Darlings' old racetrack was being used for exercising Crocker's horses.

Crocker planned to build a new mansion 185 feet above the old Darling house, sparing no expense. Utilizing the former Darling home as his own during the building process, he commissioned the architect James Brite to design a 45,000 square foot residence. Modelled after the Jacobean-style Bramshill House in England, it was built between 1903 and 1907. Workers began arriving in the spring of 1902 to work on the roads under the direction of Theodor Shuart of Ramsey, New Jersey. Excavation of the foundation began in April 1903, and construction was fully underway a year later.

The mansion was finally completed and furnished in 1907, with much time spent on the wood and stone carving. The building had a great hall on the first floor, and the house was heated by steam, with elevators and a switchboard.

Outside the mansion were outbuildings such as greenhouses, barns, stables, a dairy, gatehouse, garage, workshops, and bathhouses on the river, along with a new bridge built across the Ramapo River. There were nine single houses and four duplexes for employees, and a two-story house for the head gardener, Edmund Daches.

By 1909, the property had sixty head of Jersey cattle, with many work and carriage horses, a kennel, sheep, and chickens. There were also vines and vegetables, and in spring 1909, the farm began trucking the produce to sell in New York. Overall, it is estimated that the creation of the estate cost $2,000,000.

=== Subsequent owners ===
After Emma Crocker died in 1904 and George Crocker died in 1909, the mansion was sold to the banker Emerson McMillin, with the proceeds going to the George Crocker Special Research Fund at Columbia University for cancer research. McMillin then lived at the estate until his death in 1922.

The Immaculate Conception Seminary, which had been founded in 1861 as part of Seton Hall University in New Jersey, was located in the mansion from 1927 until 1984. During that period, it was known as the Crocker-McMillin Mansion-Immaculate Conception Seminary. In 1984, the seminary once again became part of Seton Hall University.

After the property fell out of the hands of the Catholic Diocese of Newark, it underwent restoration work. Placed on the New Jersey Register of Historic Places in 1995, the mansion was also placed on the National Register of Historic Places in 1997. In 2008, it was sold for $8.88 million to a business owner in nearby Ramsey.

In 2017, the property was put up for sale through a listing with Christie's Real Estate for a sum of $47,422,900. The asking price was subsequently reduced to approximately $39,000,000 after sitting on the market for nearly 3 years. On December 17, 2021, the property was sold for $26 million. The sale was the highest price paid for a home in New Jersey in 2021. On March 15, 2023, the house was seized after the indictment of Guo Wengui for fraud.

Forbes reported in October 2005 that the mansion was on the market for $25 million, in what it described as a "relative bargain." Although the original estate had included over 1,000 acres of land, by the time of the sale listing, development had pared the size down to 12.5 acres. Although the developer-owners Darlington Associates tried to sell the 45,000-square-foot mansion and 12.5 acres for $25 million, the property was later re-listed at $11 million.

== Features of the mansion ==
The ceiling of the library was painted by muralist James Wall Finn, and the dining room was done in California redwood.

== See also ==
- List of largest houses in the United States
- National Register of Historic Places listings in Bergen County, New Jersey
