= Exchange Bank Building (Little Rock, Arkansas) =

- U.S. National Register of Historic Places
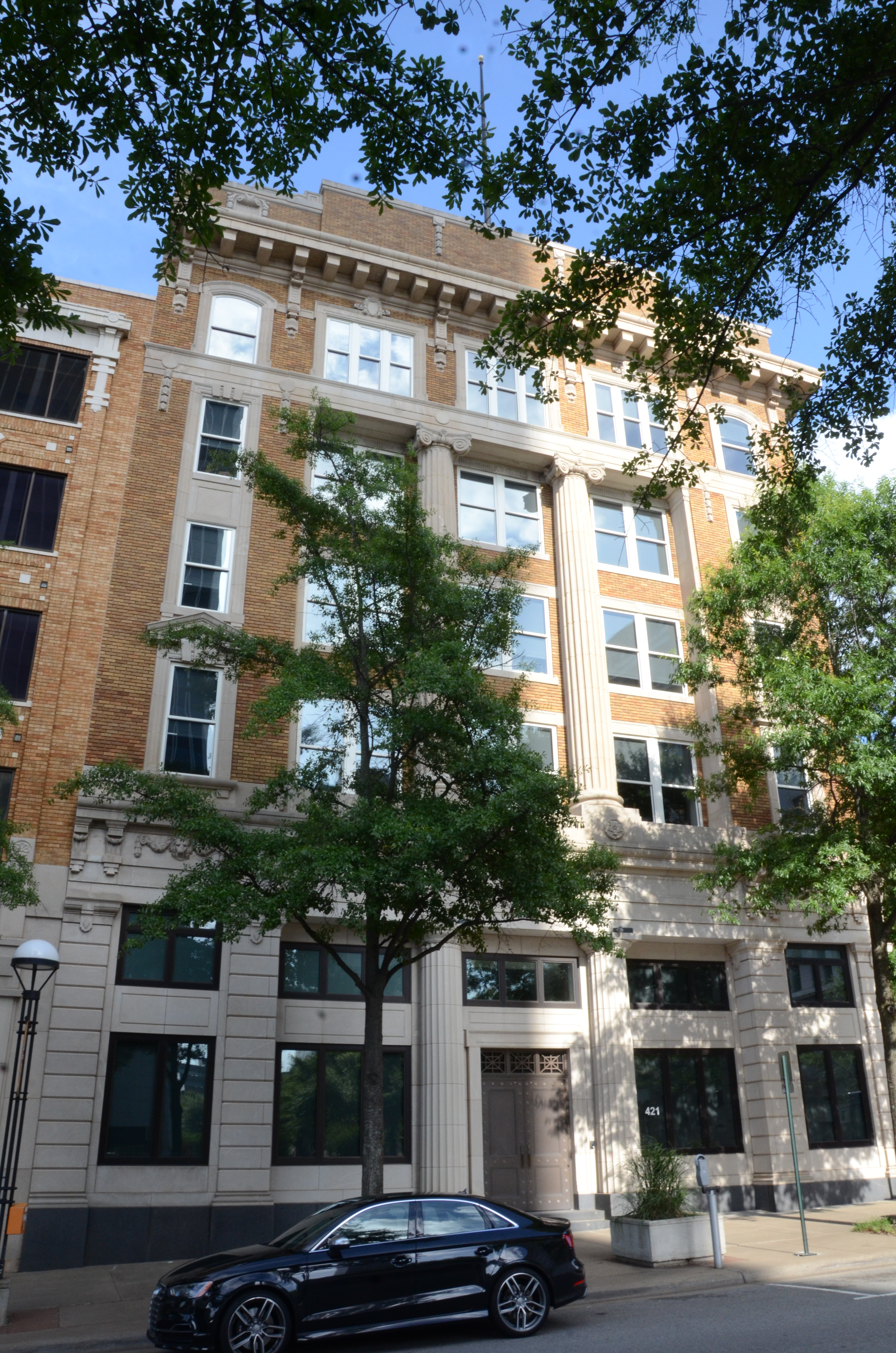

- Location within Arkansas Location within the United States
- Location: 423 Main St., Little Rock, Arkansas
- Coordinates: 34°44′45″N 92°16′15″W
- Area: less than one acre
- Built: 1921
- Architect: Thompson & Harding
- Architectural style: Classical Revival
- MPS: Thompson, Charles L., Design Collection TR
- NRHP reference No.: 86002896
- Added to NRHP: October 23, 1986

The Exchange Bank Building is a historic commercial building at 423 Main Street in Little Rock, Arkansas. It is a five-story masonry structure, built in 1921 out of reinforced concrete, brick, limestone, and granite. It has Classical Revival, with its main facade dominated by massive engaged fluted Doric columns. It was designed by the noted Arkansas architectural firm of Thompson & Harding, and is considered one of its best commercial designs.

The building was listed on the National Register of Historic Places in 1986.

== See also ==
- National Register of Historic Places listings in Little Rock, Arkansas
