= James Brite =

American architect

- Born: September 13, 1864; Pasquotank County, North Carolina, USA
- Died: February 6, 1942 (aged 77); Howey-in-the-Hills, Florida, USA
- Occupation: Architect
- Spouse: Aimée Kindersley Douglas (m. 1891)
- Buildings: The Braes; Darlington

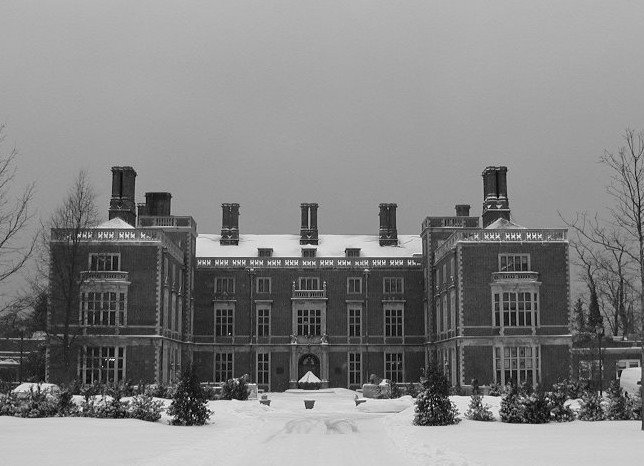
"The Braes", now Stevenson Taylor Hall, Webb Institute, Glen Cove, New York (c. 2001)

James Brite (September 13, 1864 – February 6, 1942) was an American architect.

== Early life ==
James Brite was born on September 13, 1864 in Pasquotank County, North Carolina, the son of George W. Brite and Mary Richardson. In 1870, his father was a farmer, living at New Land Township, Pasquotank County, and James was the second of five children, and the eldest son.

== Career ==
Brite worked for McKim, Mead & White (MMW) in New York City, one of the best-known architectural firms of its time. In 1897, together with Henry Bacon, they left to form Brite and Bacon Architects. Bacon is best known for having designed the Lincoln Memorial at the National Mall in Washington, D.C.

Brite retired in 1927.

== Notable works ==
Brite designed The Braes at Glen Cove, New York, for the businessman Herbert L. Pratt.

Brite was the architect of Darlington, a 45,000 square feet house at Mahwah, New Jersey, built in 1907 for George Crocker, and now owned by Ilija Pavlovic.

Brite was the architect of National Loan and Exchange Bank Building built in Columbia, SC.

Brite was the architect of the Equitable Arcade Mall built in 1912 in Columbia, SC.

He also designed “The Colony,” a residence building for seniors at Yale University in New Haven, Connecticut.

== Personal life ==
On 18 April 1891, Brite married Aimée Kindersley Douglas (1868–1951), the daughter of Nathaniel B. Kindersley and Hamilton Douglas, in Manhattan.

Brite died on February 6, 1942, at Howey-in-the-Hills, Florida. His wife survived him.
