= North Shore (Long Island) =

Area along Long Island's northern coast

North Shore of Long Island
- Coastal region
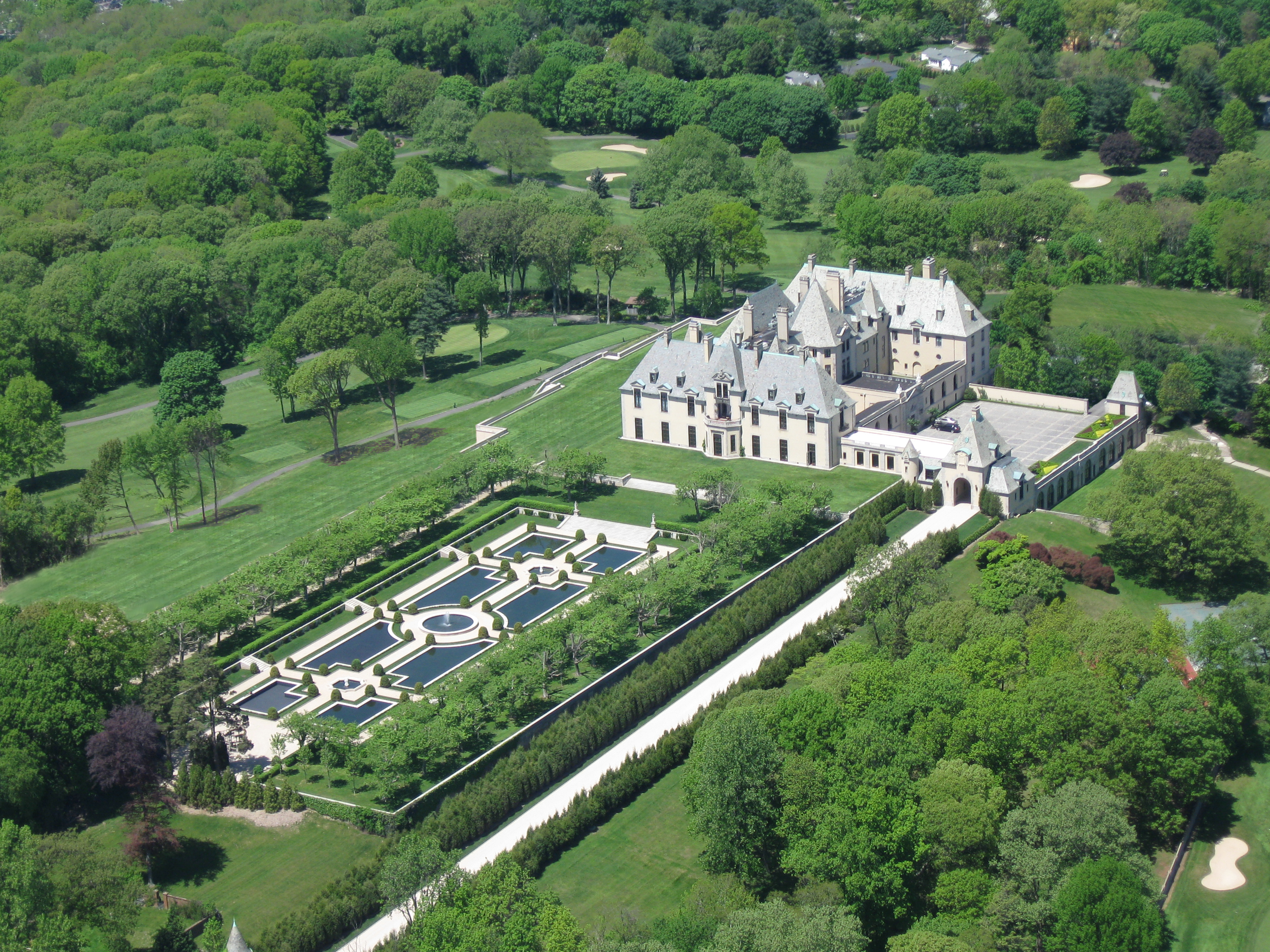
- Oheka Castle, one of the iconic Gilded Age estates on the North Shore.
- Nickname: The Gold Coast
- Interactive map of North Shore of Long Island
- Coordinates: 40.86°N 73.63°W
- Country: United States
- State: New York
- Island: Long Island
- Counties: Nassau; Suffolk; Queens (perceptually)
- Towns: List: North Hempstead; Oyster Bay; Huntington; Smithtown; Brookhaven (partially)
- Highest elevation: 387 ft (118 m)
- Lowest elevation: 0 ft (0 m)
- Time zone: UTC-5 (EST)
  - Summer (DST): UTC-4 (EDT)

The North Shore of Long Island is the area along the northern coast of New York's Long Island bordering Long Island Sound. Known for its extreme wealth and lavish estates, the North Shore exploded into affluence at the turn of the 20th century, earning it the nickname the Gold Coast. Historically, this term refers to the affluent coastline neighborhoods of the towns of North Hempstead (such as Great Neck and Port Washington), Glen Cove, and Oyster Bay in Nassau County and Huntington in Suffolk County. Some definitions may also include the parts of Smithtown that face the Sound. The region is also largely coextensive with the Gold Coast region of Long Island, though this region excludes Smithtown, as the easternmost Gold Coast mansion is the Geissler Estate, located just west of Indian Hills Country Club in the Fort Salonga section of Huntington.

Being a remnant of the Harbor Hill Moraine, the North Shore is somewhat hilly, and its beaches are more rocky than those on the flat, sandy outwash plain of the South Shore along the Atlantic Ocean. Large boulders known as glacial erratics are scattered across the area. Furthermore, the geology of the North Shore sits atop a crucial system of underground aquifers—primarily the Upper Glacial, Magothy, and Lloyd aquifers—which provide the primary source of drinking water for the region's inhabitants and are heavily protected by local environmental regulations.

== History ==
=== Colonial Era ===
The North Shore was originally inhabited by Algonquin-speaking populations, most notably the Matinecock, along with the Nesaquake (Nissequogue), Setauket, and Corchaug people. Although early European historians often categorized these indigenous populations into "Thirteen Tribes", modern archaeological and historical consensus indicates that they were actually decentralized, kin-based groups that formed fluid alliances rather than strict tribal nations.

The subsequent period of settlement was by Europeans in the mid-1600s. Much of the area was initially controlled by the Dutch colony of New Netherland. Towns in the eastern part of the North Shore were settled by the English under the jurisdiction of the New Haven Colony and Connecticut Colony. This arrangement ended in 1664 with the English takeover of New Netherland, when all of Long Island was transferred into the new Province of New York.

In its early days, the North Shore was largely agricultural. Whaling was also a prominent component of the early economy along the coast, as is commemorated today in Cold Spring Harbor's Whaling Museum & Education Center.

=== Gilded Era ===
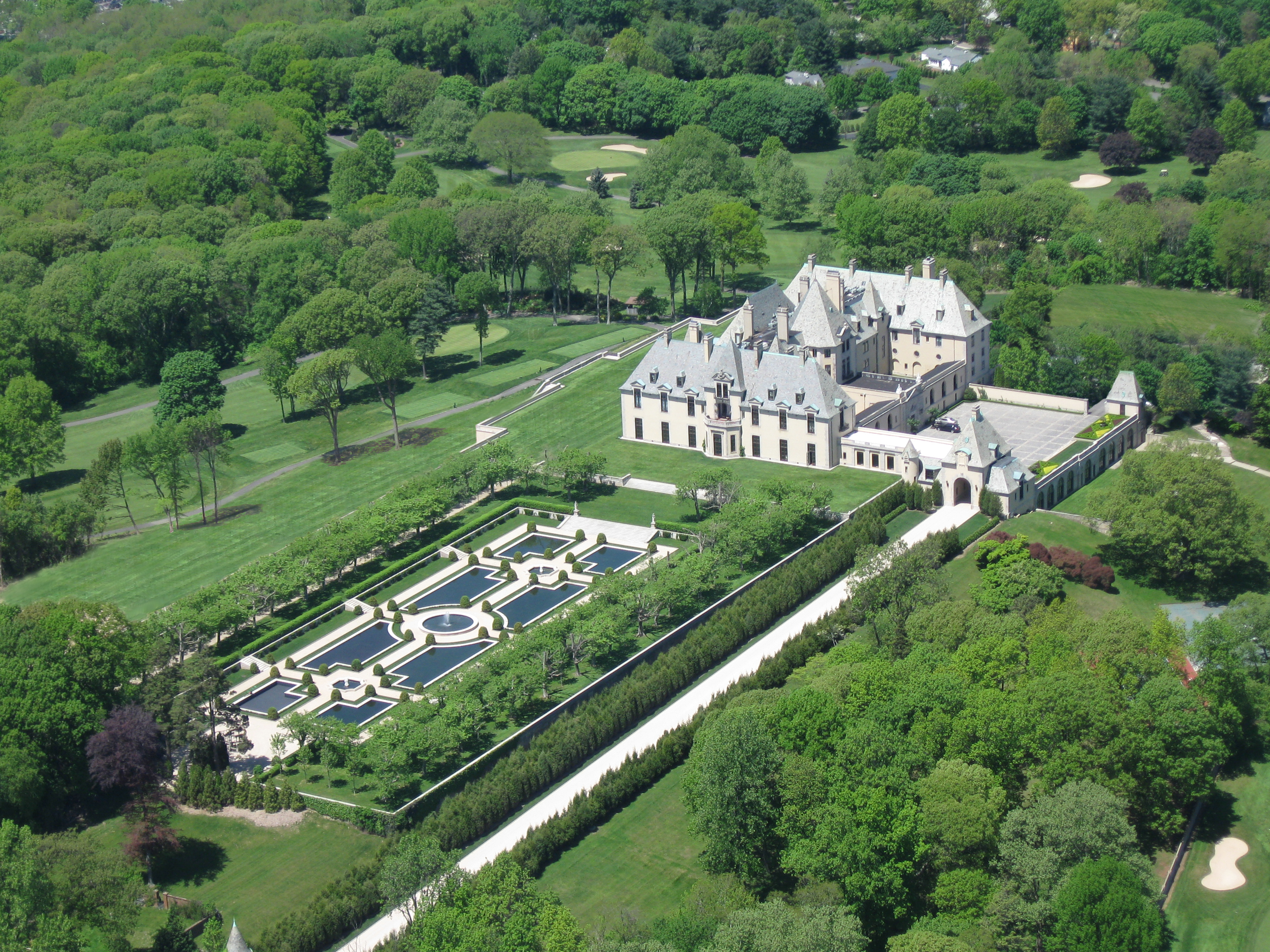
Oheka Castle, former estate of financier Otto Hermann Kahn

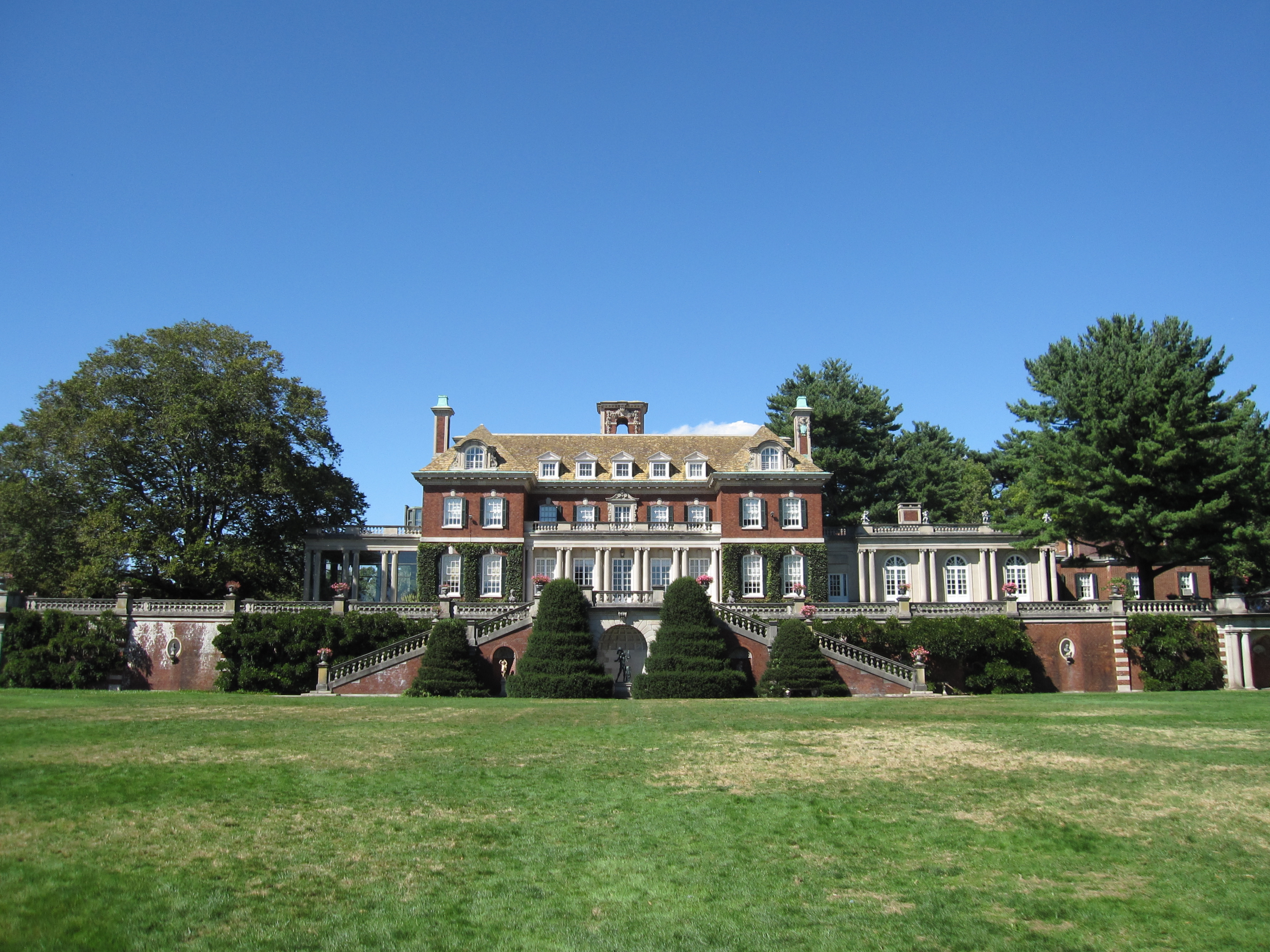
Old Westbury Gardens, the former estate of U.S. Steel heir John Shaffer Phipps and now a museum home

During the Second Industrial Revolution, great fortunes were made in steel, transportation, and other industries. Beginning in the early 1890s, lavish private estates were erected on what became known as the "Gold Coast" of Long Island. In all, over 500 mansions were built during this spree, concentrated in 70 square miles (180 km^{2}).

Among those were expansive faux chateaux and castles belonging to the Vanderbilts, Astors, Whitneys, Charles Pratt, J. P. Morgan, F. W. Woolworth, and others. Otto Kahn's Oheka Castle was reputed to be the second largest private home in the United States, second only to the Biltmore Estate in Asheville, North Carolina. Alternatively, some eschewed formal mansions and erected large shingle-style and clapboard "cottages", such as Theodore Roosevelt's Sagamore Hill.

The greatest architects, landscapers, decorators, and firms were employed, including Stanford White, John Russell Pope, Guy Lowell, and Carrère and Hastings. Architectural styles included English Tudor, French Chateau, Georgian, Gothic, Mediterranean, Norman, Roman, Spanish, and combinations of these. Rooms, outdoor structures, and entire buildings were sometimes completely dismantled in Europe and meticulously reassembled on the North Shore. Complementing the great houses were formal gardens, gazebos, greenhouses, stables, guest houses, gate houses, swimming pools, reflecting pools, ponds, children's playhouses, pleasure palaces, golf courses, and tennis courts. Activities such as horseback riding, hunting, fishing, fox hunting, polo, yachting, golf, swimming, tennis, skeet shooting, and winter sports were held at the estates or exclusive clubs nearby such as the Beaver Dam Club, the Seawanhaka Corinthian Yacht Club (1871), Meadow Brook Club (1881), Manhasset Bay Yacht Club (1892), Piping Rock Club (1912), and Creek Club (1923). Privacy was strictly maintained with huge land holdings, thick hedges and trees, iron fences, gates and gate houses, private roads, and the deliberate omission of estate locations from public maps.

=== Post-War era ===
Following World War II, many Gold Coast mansions were demolished and their estates subdivided into suburban-style developments as property taxes, labor shortages, and maintenance costs soared. Only about 200 of the original 500 survive. As fortunes faded, some of the largest or most prominent Gilded Era showpieces, such as Daniel Guggenheim's Gould-Guggenheim Estate, Theodore Roosevelt's Sagamore Hill, William Vanderbilt II's Eagle's Nest, the Alexander P. de Seversky Mansion, Otto Kahn's Oheka Castle, and John Shaffer Phipps' Westbury House were turned into museum homes, conference centers, and resorts. Others repurposed for non-residential uses include Herbert L. Pratt's Glen Cove country home, The Braes, turned into the Webb Institute, Walter Chrysler's Kings Point estate, "Forker House", turned into the United States Merchant Marine Academy, and U.S. Steel heir Childs Frick's "Clayton", which is now the Nassau County Museum of Art.

== Geography ==
Delineated perceptually by the Queens-Nassau border, the North Shore is marked by a series of necks (peninsulas) and populated harbors. North Hempstead, Oyster Bay, and Huntington comprise the land of this area, which is noted for its preservation of Gilded Age Estates. Beyond here, the towns of Smithtown and Brookhaven feature a similar trend of peninsulas and sheltered harbors, and are the sites of often similarly affluent areas such as Stony Brook, Port Jefferson, Wading River, etc., though the inclusion of these areas in the North Shore region varies by definition.

Once the island splits into two forks at its east end, the hills largely flatten out (entering the town of Riverhead) into an outwash plain and becomes largely rural (entering the Town of Southold), with an economic stronghold on agriculture, particularly in the shape of wineries and vineyards. This recent trend, beginning in the 1980s with the conversion of potato farms, has given the North Fork the distinction of being the most productive agricultural area in New York State. Despite this, the North Fork contrasts starkly with the more populated and more well-known South Fork's Hamptons. The North Fork terminates at Orient Point, where the Cross Sound Ferry Company operates a terminal for ferries bound for New London, CT, and Block Island, RI. The North Fork is almost never considered part of the North Shore, but is rather viewed as a separate, more rural geographic area.

Greenport, a village in Southold midway between Orient and Riverhead, is a major economic center for the North Fork and serves as the eastern terminus of the Long Island Rail Road's Main Line. The North Fork is also geographically tied to Shelter Island, an island town in the Peconic Bay accessible via a ferry that leaves from Greenport, adjacent to the railroad station. The island also has a ferry on its south side that connects with North Haven on the South Fork.

== In popular culture ==
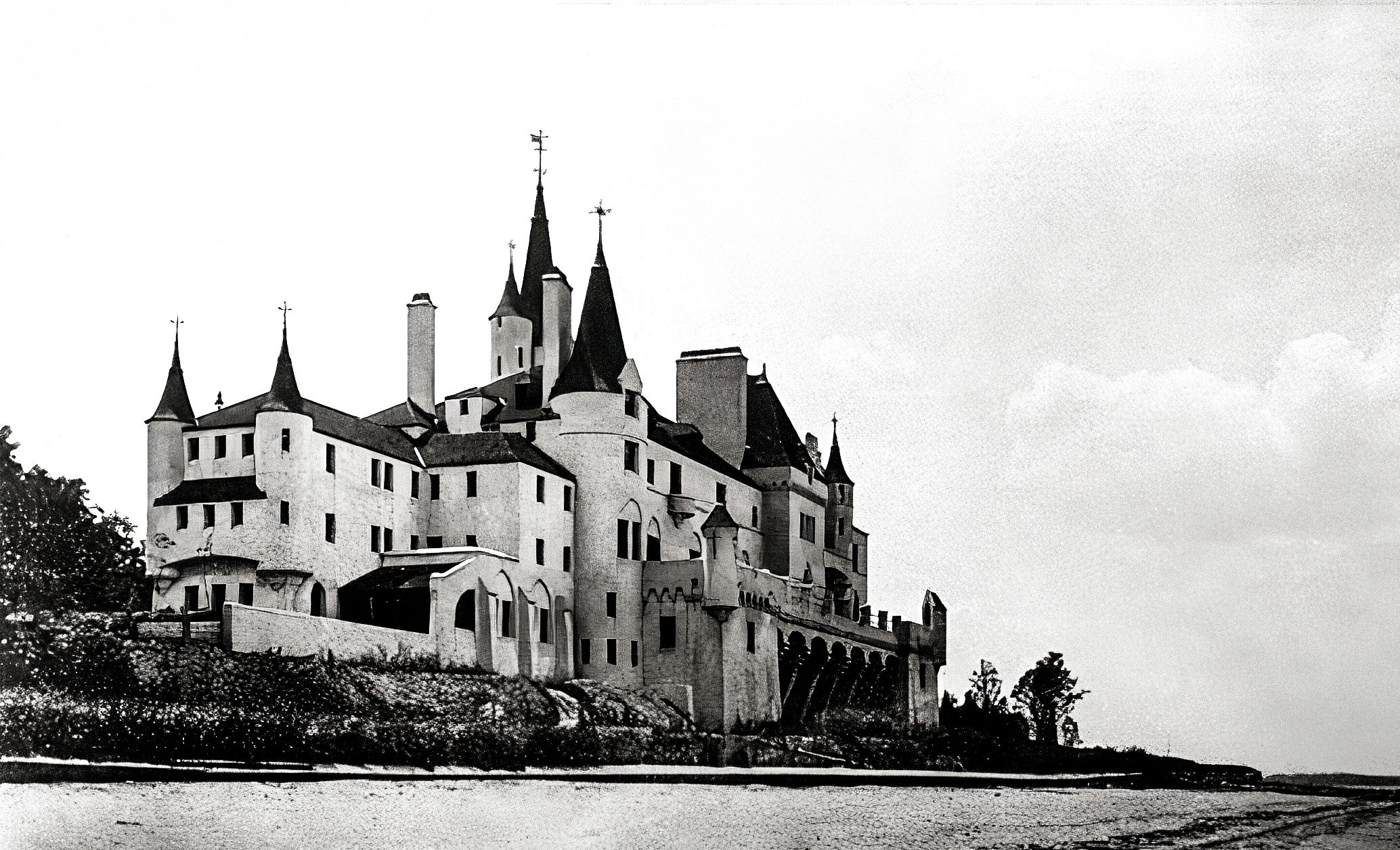
The demolished Beacon Towers estate, along with Oheka Castle, has been identified as an influence for the novel The Great Gatsby

- In 1925, the North Shore served as the setting of F. Scott Fitzgerald's classic novel The Great Gatsby, which centers on the area's wealth and the aspiration of the title character to be accepted into its high society. The novel's "West Egg" and "East Egg" were fictionalized versions of the real North Shore villages of Kings Point and Sands Point, respectively.
- In 1990, the novel Gold Coast by Nelson DeMille is set on the North Shore, exploring the dynamics of old money and new mobster influence.
- The distinctive upper class speech pattern known as "Locust Valley lockjaw" takes its name from the North Shore's Locust Valley area. The aristocratic cachet persists in cultural memory despite suburban infill converting much of the North Shore into commuter towns.

== Extant Gold Coast estates ==
- Caumsett
- Coindre Hall
- Greentree
- Bogheid
- Cedarmere
- Salutation
- Winfield Hall
- Mill Neck Manor
- Hempstead House
- Castle Gould
- Delamater-Bevin Mansion
- Nassau Hall
- Elmcroft
- Rynwood
- Oheka Castle
- Chelsea, presently in the Muttontown preserve
- Land of Clover, presently The Knox School
- Poplar Hill, presently Glengarrif Nursing Home
- Adam-Derby House, presently Landmark Colony at Oyster Bay
- Harry E. Donnell House, presently the Carr Bed & Breakfast
- The Manor, presently the Glen Cove Mansion
- Killenworth, presently the Russian Delegation Retreat House
- Ormston House, presently St. Josephat's Monastery
- Meadow Brook Golf Club, formerly Jericho House
- East Woods School, formerly Mallow
- Eisenhower Park, formerly Lannin House
- Great Neck Public Schools Administrative building, formerly Bonnie Blink
- Banfi Vintners, formerly Rynwood
- Glen Cove Gurdwara, formerly Glenlo
- Buckley Country Day School, formerly Northcourt
- Cold Spring Harbor Laboratory Banbury Center, formerly the Charles S. Robertson residence
- Glen Cove City School District Administrative building, formerly the Robert D. Pruyn residence
- Harmony Heights School, formerly Brexleigh
- Holy Child Academy, formerly the Cornelius Bluss Residence
- Nassau County Museum of Art, formerly Clayton
- Clark Botanic Gardens, formerly the Grenville Clark Sr. Residence
- Portledge Academy, formerly Portledge
- Bailey Arboretum, formerly Munnysunk
- LIU Post, formerly Hillwood
- Old Westbury Gardens, formerly Westbury House
- Long Island Lutheran Middle and High School, formerly Highpool
- Planting Fields, formerly Coe Hall
- United States Merchant Marine Academy, formerly Forker House
- Vanderbilt Museum, formerly Eagle's Nest
- Webb Institute, formerly The Braes
- Welwyn Preserve, formerly the Welwyn Estate

== List of communities ==
- Asharoken
- Baxter Estates
- Bayville
- Belle Terre
- Brookville
- Calverton
- Carle Place
- Centerport
- Centre Island
- Cold Spring Harbor
- Commack
- Cove Neck
- Dix Hills
- East Hills
- East Setauket
- East Shoreham
- East Northport
- East Norwich
- East Williston
- Eatons Neck
- Elwood
- Flower Hill
- Fort Salonga
- Garden City Park
- Glen Cove
- Glen Head
- Glenwood Landing
- Great Neck
- Great Neck Estates
- Greenport
- Halesite
- Harbor Hills
- Head of the Harbor
- Herricks
- Huntington
- Huntington Bay
- Huntington Station
- Jericho
- Kensington
- Kings Park
- Kings Point
- Lake Success
- Lattingtown
- Laurel Hollow
- Locust Valley
- Lloyd Harbor
- Manhasset
- Manhasset Hills
- Manorhaven
- Matinecock
- Mattituck
- Mill Neck
- Miller Place
- Mineola
- Mount Sinai
- Muttontown
- New Cassel
- New Hyde Park
- Nissequogue
- North Hills
- North New Hyde Park
- Northport
- Oyster Bay
- Oyster Bay Cove
- Old Brookville
- Old Field
- Old Westbury
- Orient
- Plandome
- Plandome Manor
- Poquott
- Port Jefferson
- Port Jefferson Station
- Port Washington North
- Port Washington
- Ridge
- Rocky Point
- Roslyn
- Roslyn Estates
- Roslyn Harbor
- Roslyn Heights
- Saddle Rock
- Saddle Rock Estates
- Sands Point
- Sea Cliff
- Setauket
- Shoreham
- Smithtown
- Sound Beach
- Southold
- South Huntington
- Stony Brook
- Strongs Neck
- Syosset
- Terryville
- Thomaston
- Upper Brookville
- Wading River
- West Hills
- Williston Park
- Woodbury

== See also ==
- The Hamptons, New York
- Gold Coast (Connecticut)
- Gold Coast (New Jersey)
- Gold Coast (Florida)
- List of glacial moraines
- Terminal moraine
