= East Woods School =

Coordinates: 40°51′17″N 73°30′6″W

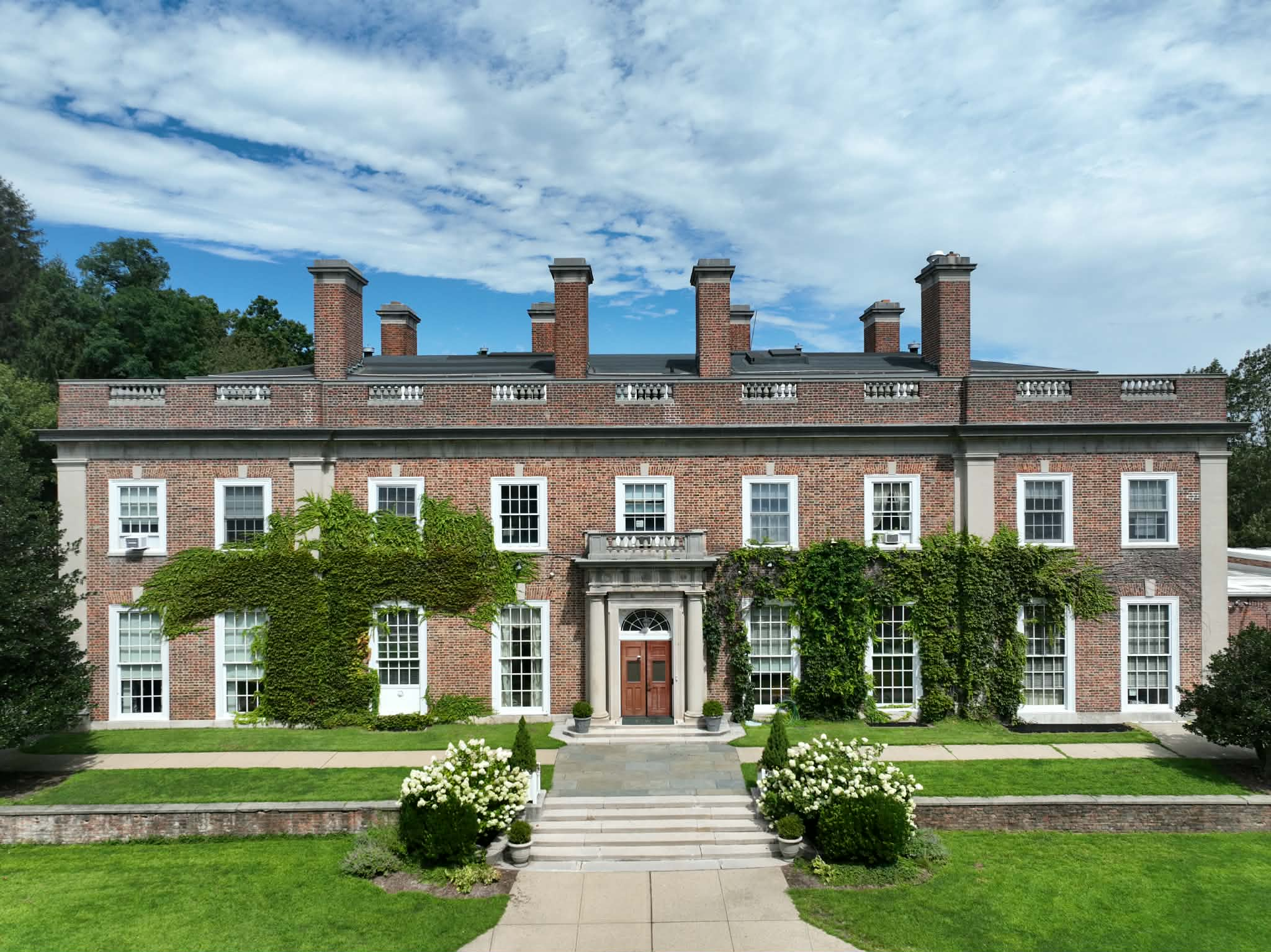
- The former Walter Farwell Mansion known as "Mallow," now the East Woods School in Oyster Bay Cove, New York.
- Oyster Bay Cove, New York; United States

Information
- Type: Private Independent Co-Ed
- Established: 1946
- Head of school: Laura Kang
- Grades: Pre-Nursery – 8th grade
- Enrollment: 194 (2022-2023)
- Campus: Suburban
- Colors: Green and White
- Mascot: Spartan
- Nickname: Spartans
- Yearbook: The Echo
- Website: www.eastwoods.org

East Woods School (EWS) is a private, non-sectarian, coeducational day school in Oyster Bay Cove, Long Island, New York. The independent school serves an enrollment of approximately 200 pre-nursery through eighth grade students drawn from many local communities.

== School info ==
East Woods School is an independent, non-sectarian, coeducational day school for students in pre nursery through eighth grade.

Located on 31 Yellow Cote Road in Oyster Bay Cove, the school was founded in 1946 by a group of concerned parents seeking to provide an education combining exemplary academics and character development. It occupies the grounds of the Walter Farwell mansion "Mallow", built in 1918. The 45-acre (180,000 m^{2}) campus includes a 20,000 volume library, two computer labs, two art studios, two gyms, two music rooms, a science lab, a headmaster's house, four playing fields and an outdoor swimming pool. The school has three divisions, with the Early Childhood Center (ECC) of Pre-nursery, Nursery, and Pre-K classrooms sharing the same academic building with the Lower School of grades K-4, and the Upper School of grades 5-8 having its own. The school year offers frequent assemblies that include visits by famous and important people and speakers, along with groups that perform shows for the students.

Average student to teacher ratios:

- Pre-Nursery: 4 to 1
- Nursery - K: 8 to 1
- Grades 1-8: 12 to 1

The current Head of School (since July 2017) is Laura Kang, its first female to hold the position.

=== Academics ===
Languages offered by the school include Spanish.

=== Admissions ===
The school charges a tuition ($10,000-$40,000) depending on grade, though financial aid of up to 60% of tuition is available. Most students are given an admission exam to determine level. East Woods School states that it does not discriminate against anyone by race, religion, or ethnicity.

=== Campus ===
The East Woods campus is found about 35 miles east of New York City and is found in Oyster Bay, Long Island. The campus is located on one of Long Island's highest hilltops, and the main building is surrounded by 46 acres of woodland.

=== Athletics ===
Interscholastic sports involve fourth through eighth grade students. The students' choices are between soccer, basketball, baseball, and softball.

=== After School ===
East Woods provides a range of after school activities such a musical theater program, advanced science labs and various other after-school enrichments.

=== Library ===
The newly renovated Rousmaniere Library is the center of many academic, curricular and community-related activities for East Woods School. The facility contains approximately 20,000 volumes, including an extensive reference collection, which is supplemented with online databases. The library includes an area with networked computers and a SmartBoard to provide an interactive learning environment. The library hosts both the Early Childhood Program and space for students to conduct research for their independent study projects.

=== Camp East Woods summer program ===
Camp East Woods is a six-week summer program held on the East Woods School campus, offered to boys and girls between the ages of 3 and 12 years. The program is divided into four groups based on age and interests. Activities include sports and outdoor games, arts and crafts, jewelry-making, computer games, cooking, dance, theater, and chess. The Discovery summer program is well known in the area for its two huge slip-and-slides that run down a hill in the back of the school. Every child age five and up receives swimming instruction from certified lifeguards.

== Communities served ==
The local communities the East Woods School serves include Oyster Bay, Oyster Bay Cove, East Norwich, Centerport, Cove Neck, Cold Spring Harbor, Locust Valley, Huntington, Glen Cove, Laurel Hollow, Brookville, Upper Brookville, Old Brookville, Syosset and Muttontown.
