= Egerton Leigh Winthrop =

American lawyer and clubman

- Born: October 7, 1838; New York City, New York, U.S.
- Died: April 6, 1916 (aged 77); New York City, New York, U.S.
- Education: Columbia College
- Spouse: Charlotte Troup Bronson (m. 1861; died 1872)
- Children: 3
- Parent(s): Benjamin Robert Winthrop; Elizabeth Ann Neilson Coles

Egerton Leigh Winthrop (October 7, 1838 – April 6, 1916) was an American lawyer and clubman who was prominent in New York society during the Gilded Age.

== Early life ==
Winthrop was born on October 7, 1838, in New York City. He was the son of Benjamin Robert Winthrop (1804–1879) and Elizabeth Ann Neilson "Eliza" (née Coles) Winthrop. His siblings included Benjamin Robert Winthrop, Jr.; Anna Neilson Winthrop, who married Horatio Greenough Curtis; and William Neilson Winthrop, who married Louise Van Zandt. His father inherited significant properties and was a noted philanthropist before his death in London in 1879.

His maternal grandfather was William Neilson Coles. His paternal grandparents were Benjamin Winthrop, a descendant of Wait Winthrop and Joseph Dudley, and Judith (née Stuyvesant) Winthrop, a direct descendant of Peter Stuyvesant, the Director-General of New Netherland, and Robert Livingston the Elder, the 1st Lord of Livingston Manor. His paternal aunt, Elizabeth Sheriffe Winthrop, was married to the Rev. Dr. John White Chanler and they were the parents of U.S. Representative John Winthrop Chanler, Egerton's first cousin who was married to Margaret Astor Ward, the daughter of Samuel Cutler Ward and granddaughter of William Backhouse Astor, Sr. Another aunt, Margaret Cornelia Winthrop, was married to George Folsom, the U.S. Chargé d'affaires to the Netherlands.

== Career ==
Winthrop was admitted to the bar in 1860 after graduating from Columbia College that same year, where he was a member of Delta Phi fraternity. He practiced law and served as a vice president of the Union Square Savings Bank and a trustee of the United States Trust Company and the Institute for Savings of Merchants' Clerks, until his retirement.

=== Society life ===
In 1892, the widowed Winthrop, along with his son Frederic and several members of his wife's family, was included in Ward McAllister's "Four Hundred", purported to be an index of New York's best families, published in The New York Times. Conveniently, 400 was the number of people that could fit into Mrs. Astor's ballroom.

Winthrop was a member of the Columbia University Alumni Association, the Metropolitan Museum of Art, and the Union Club of the City of New York, the City Club, the Metropolitan Club, the Century Club, and the Knickerbocker Club, of which he served as president. He was also a member of the Saint Nicholas Society, a charitable organization in New York City of men who are descended from early inhabitants of the State of New York.

== Personal life ==
In 1861, Winthrop was married to Charlotte Troup Bronson (1840–1872), the daughter of Frederic Bronson and sister of Frederic Bronson Jr. Charlotte's grandfather, Isaac Bronson, was a founder of the New York Life and Trust Company. The Winthrops lived at 23 East 33rd Street in New York. Together, they were the parents of:

- Egerton Leigh Winthrop, Jr. (1862–1926), a lawyer and banker in New York who married Emeline Dore Heckscher (1874-1948), the daughter of John G. Heckscher and Cornelia Lawrence (née Whitney) Heckscher. Egerton also served as a president of the Board of Education.
- Charlotte Troup Bronson (1863–1893), who married Henry Spencer Cram (1852–1895), brother of John Sergeant Cram, in Newport on November 28, 1892.
- Frederic Bronson Winthrop (1863–1944), a prominent lawyer with Winthrop & Stimson who did not marry.

Winthrop died on April 6, 1916, at his home in New York City. After a service at Trinity Church, he was buried at St. Mark's Church in-the-Bowery Churchyard in New York. He left his estate in one third portions to his two sons and his only daughter's only child. His New York home and Newport cottage were to his sons as tenants in common and the Stuyvesant family heirlooms, including the Stuyvesant clock and christening bowl were left to his eldest son.

=== Descendants ===
Through his eldest son Egerton, he was the grandfather of Muriel E. Winthrop (b. 1895), who married several times, including to Richard de Blois Boardman (1878–1937), and later, Harold Aymar Sands (1886-1951), a grandson of banker Samuel Stevens Sands.

Through his daughter Charlotte, he was the grandfather of Charlotte Winthrop Cram (1893–1970), whose birth led to the death of Winthrop's daughter Charlotte five days later. Charlotte was married to lawyer Robert Ludlow Fowler Jr. (1887–1974) in 1914, with her Winthrop grandfather walking her down the aisle. Ludlow, as her husband was known, was a close friend of author F. Scott Fitzgerald and served as best man at the wedding of F. Scott and Zelda Fitzgerald. Fitzgerald based the main character of his short story, The Rich Boy on Fowler. Charlotte and Ludlow were the parents of Robert Ludlow Fowler III (1919–1942) and Angela Fowler (1915–1989), who married Craig Wylie (1908–1976).
