= Nassau Hall (Muttontown, New York) =

Historic mansion in Muttontown, New York

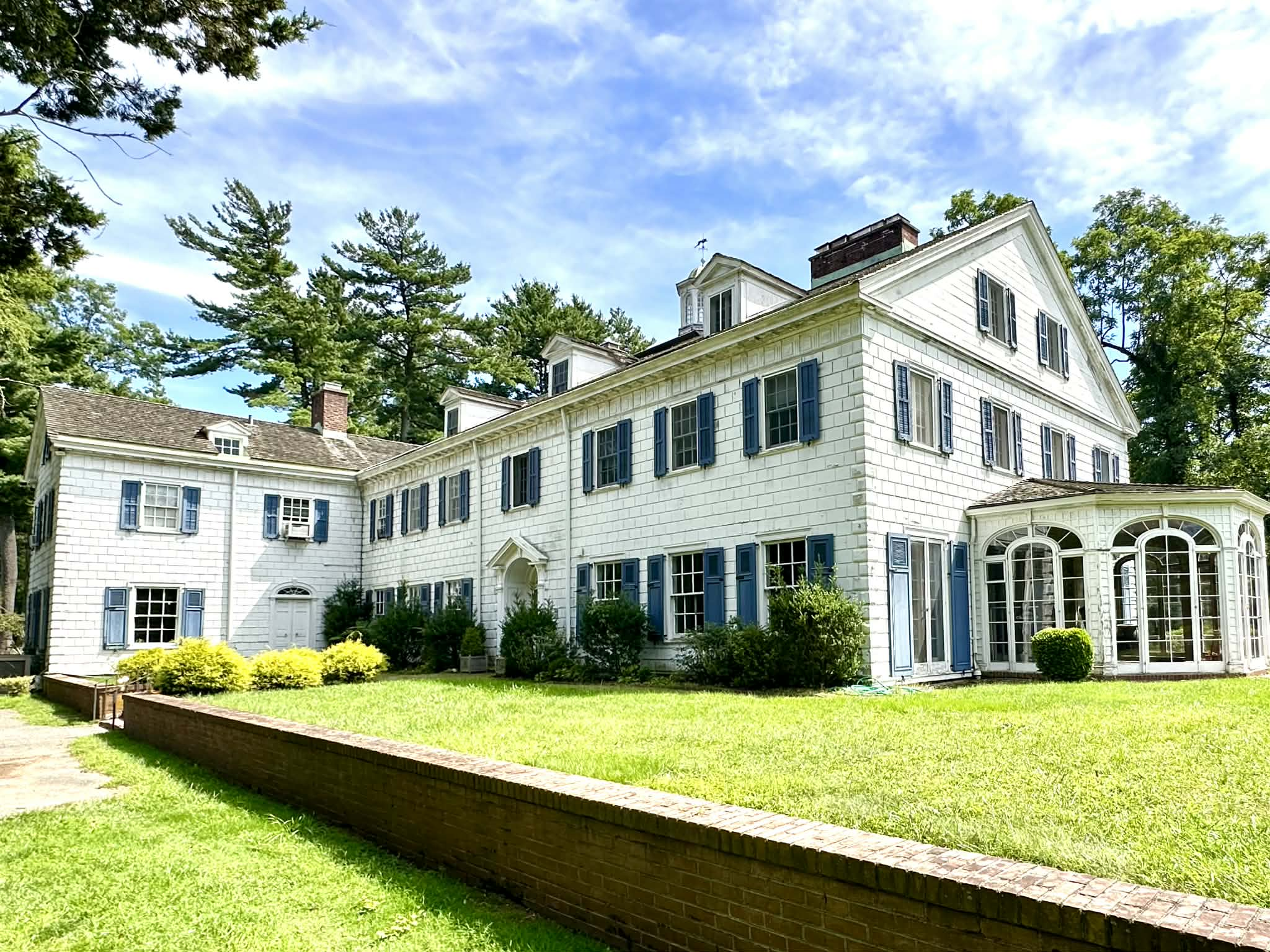
- Nassau Hall as pictured in 2025.
- Interactive map of the Nassau Hall area
- Former names: Muttontown Meadows

General information
- Type: House
- Location: Muttontown Preserve, Oyster Bay, New York; 351-, 1471 Muttontown Rd, Syosset, NY 11791
- Coordinates: 40.823°N 73.539°W
- Opened: 1904
- Owner: Bronson Winthrop (original); Nassau County (current)

Design and construction
- Architect: Delano & Aldrich

Nassau Hall is a historic mansion on the grounds of the Muttontown Preserve in the Village of Muttontown in Oyster Bay, New York. It was built in 1904 for Bronson Winthrop and was known as Muttontown Meadows. It was the first commission of Delano & Aldrich in the area. Its exterior walls were modeled after Mount Vernon, George Washington's home and it was on an estate of 183 acres.

It was purchased by Lansdell Christie in 1950, who sold it to Nassau County in 1969. It became the headquarters of the Nassau Parks Conservancy and it was restored in 2010. Nassau Hall is one of three mansions in the Muttontown Preserve, along with the Benjamin Moore Estate, also known as Chelsea, and the Knollwood Estate, which was destroyed.
