= Jericho High School =

Public high school in the state of New York

Jericho Senior High School

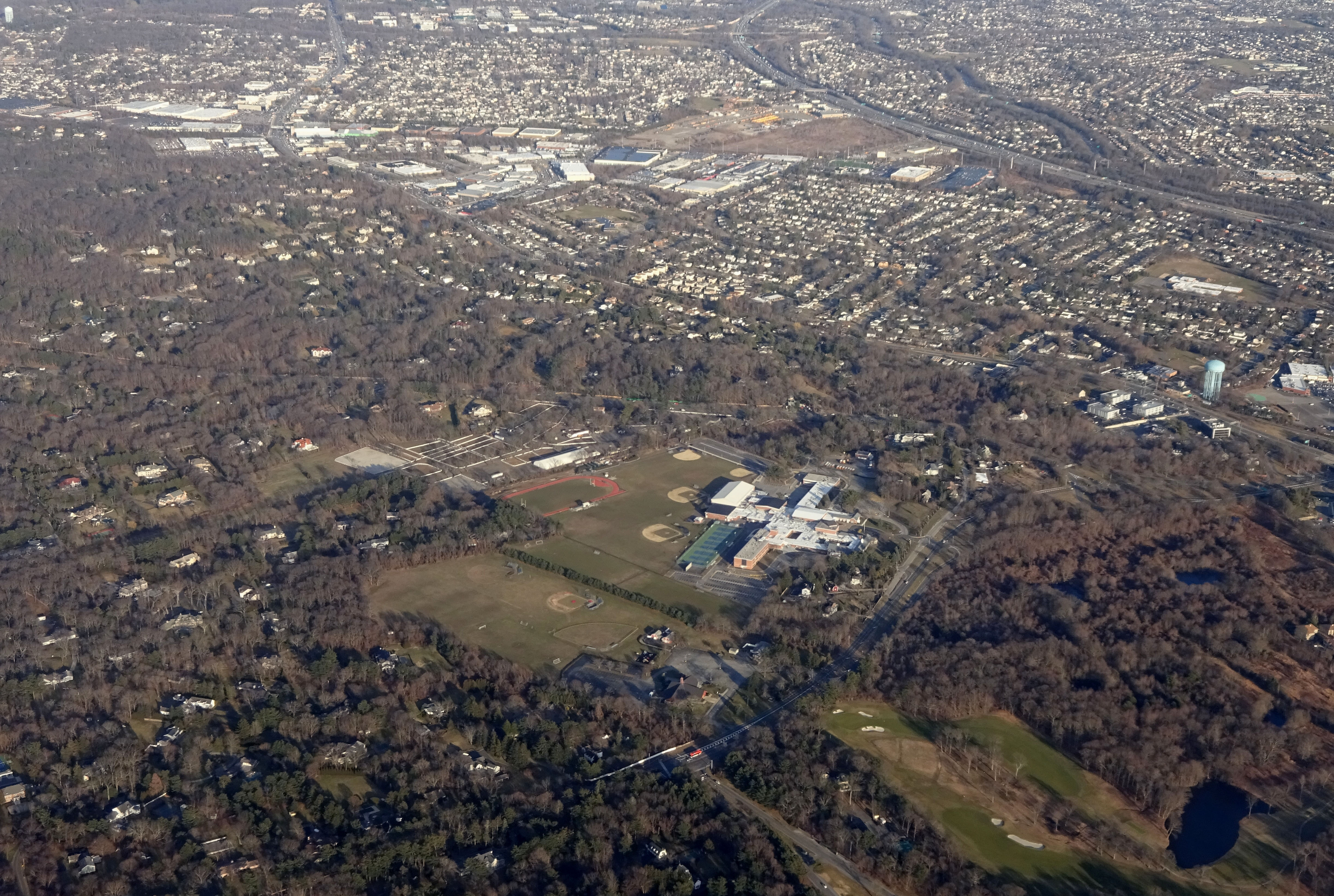
- Jericho High School from the air in 2020

Location
- 99 Cedar Swamp Road; Jericho, New York 11753; United States; 40°47′55″N 73°32′34″W

Information
- Type: Comprehensive high school
- Motto: "Excellence in education begins here."
- Established: 1959
- School district: Jericho Union Free School District
- Principal: Brian Cummings and Joseph Prisinzano
- Faculty: 107.89 FTEs
- Grades: 9-12
- Enrollment: 1,260 (as of 2024-2025)
- Student to teacher ratio: 11.68
- Campus type: Suburban
- Colors: Blue and gold
- Mascot: Jayhawks
- Website: School website

Jericho Senior High School (JHS) is an American comprehensive public high school in the hamlet of Jericho in Nassau County, New York. It is the only high school in the Jericho Union Free School District. Jericho High School is nationally renowned as a top-performing public high school, and as of 2024 it was ranked #104 in the United States by U.S. News and World Report, the highest ranking for any non-charter, non-magnet suburban high school in the country. The school opened in 1959.

As of the 2022–2023 school year, the school had an enrollment of 1,195 students and 104 classroom teachers (on an FTE basis), for a student–teacher ratio of 11.5:1. There were 155 students (13% of enrollment) eligible for free lunch.

== Cost of education ==
For the 2018–2019 school year, the Jericho Union Free School District spent a total of $121 million for a projected number of 3200 students, of which 1124 were students of Jericho High School. $37,600 was spent per student, which is US$451,200 for a student studying for 12 years from grade 1 to 12.

In the 2011–2012 school year, Jericho Public School district spent a total of US$111,962,251 for 3026 students of K-12, of which 1202 were Jericho High School students. US$37,000 was spent per student, which is US$444,000 for a student studying for 12 years from grade 1 to 12.

== Academics ==
In Newsweek magazine's 2015 list of the Top 500 American High Schools, Jericho High School was ranked 27th in the U.S. and third in New York State.

Jericho High School is also consistently ranked in the top 100 high schools in the nation by U.S. News & World Report's Best High Schools ranking, as well as in the top 50 of Niche's Best Public High Schools Ranking.

The school offers many Advanced Placement classes and St. John's University college credit classes, has among the highest average SAT scores in the country, and spends more money on each student than nearly all other Long Island schools. Many Jericho graduates go on to the Ivy League institutions, NYU, SUNY, and many other first and second tier national institutions.

Mean S.A.T. scores - Class of 2014
Reading	Math	Writing	Total
624	669	648	1941/2400

Mean S.A.T. scores - Class of 2018
Reading	Math	Total
628	690	1318/1600

== Extracurriculars ==
Jericho High School offers many clubs and academic extracurricular activities. Jericho also has science and social science research programs, consistently producing ISEF and Regeneron STS semifinalists, as well as a few Regeneron STS finalists. Many students have won the Brain Bee held at LIU Post. The Debate Team has placed in the New York State Forensic League Championship Tournament in the Lincoln Douglas and Public Forum categories. The Science Olympiad team has placed within the top six at national invitationals, such as the Rice University Invitational, and consistently qualified for the New York State Tournament. The Drama club does two shows per year, one drama and one musical, and is known as the Harlequin Players. In 2023, the Drama Club was chosen by Disney Theatrical, as New York's sole winner, to produce the full Disney Broadway version of 'Frozen'.

== Athletics ==
The sports teams are known as the Jayhawks. Jericho High School has long-standing rivalries with neighboring Great Neck South High School, Long Beach High School, Hicksville High School, Syosset High School and Roslyn High School. The 2011, 2012, and 2019 boys' varsity soccer teams won the New York State Championship.

== Demographics ==
In the 2022–2023 school year, the number of students enrolled were:

- 321 in grade 9
- 301 in grade 10
- 317 in grade 11
- 324 in grade 12
- 1263 total enrollment (grades 9 to 12)

In the 2023–24 school year, the student body was 62.4% Asian, 30.0% White, and 3.5% Hispanic.

Historically, the student body was largely Jewish. However, in recent years Jericho has seen exorbitant growth in its Asian American population, so much so that by 2020, Asians made up the majority of students in the Jericho Union Free School District.

== Notable alumni ==
- Madison Beer (born 1999), musician
- Jon Carin (born 1964), musician, Pink Floyd
- Jordan Cila (born 1982), soccer midfielder
- Adam Fox (born 1998), NHL hockey player, defenseman, New York Rangers
- Jane Gross (born 1947), sportswriter, New York Times columnist, author, A Bittersweet Season
- Howard Lutnick (born 1961), businessman and United States Secretary of Commerce
- pH-1 (born 1989), rapper
- Eric Shaw (born 1973), Emmy Award-winning writer
- Adrienne Shelly (Levine) (born 1966), actress
- Jamie-Lynn Sigler (born 1981), actress; played Meadow Soprano on the HBO series The Sopranos
- Russell Simins (born 1965), musician
