= Muttontown Preserve =

Coordinates: 40°49′56″N 73°32′07″W

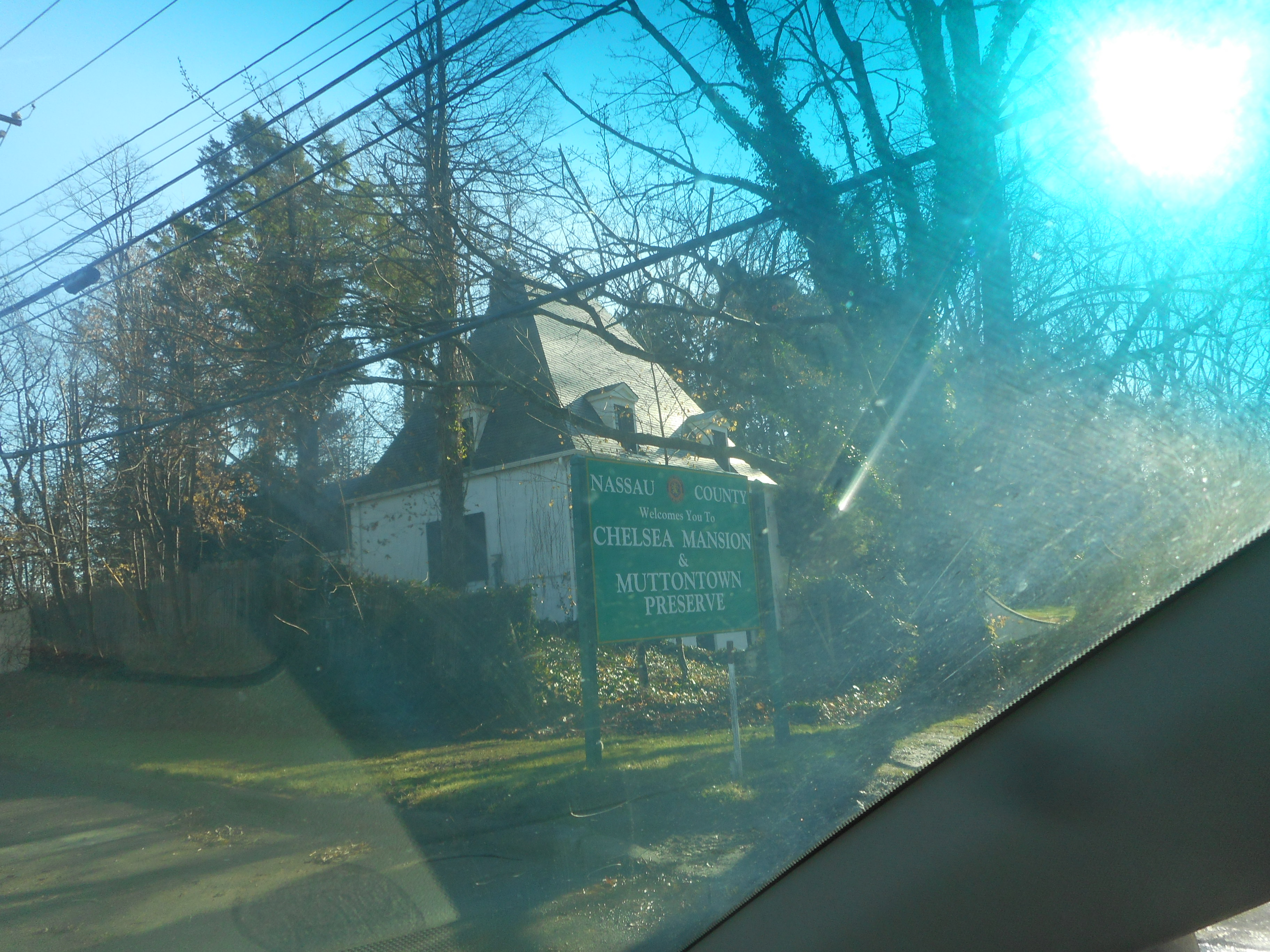
Sign at the entrance to the Chelsea Mansion and Muttontown Preserve

The Muttontown Preserve is a 550-acre nature preserve in Muttontown, New York.

== History ==
The preserve was created at the combination of three former estates. The Muttontown Nature Center and Chelsea Estate is on a former 100-acre estate donated by Alexandra Moore McKay, whose family owned the Chelsea Family Farm in what is now Chelsea, Manhattan. The largest transaction was a purchase of the Lansdell Christie Estate from Lansdell Christie, a pioneer in Liberia industry. On this land was King Zog's Knollwood Estate, a 60-room mansion that he let go to ruin. Having never entered the United States, Zog sold the land to Christie, who sold it to Nassau County. The mansion was demolished by the Christie family in 1959, however some evidence of it lingers as stairs and broken fountains. The actual building does not exist any more.

== Grounds ==
The Chelsea Mansion is a 40-room mansion that is on the National Register of Historic Places. Built in 1929, it perfectly exhibits the architectural design of the Long Island Gold Coast Era, with French, English, and Chinese influences. It can be rented out for private events, like weddings and corporate retreats.

Also in the preserve is the Nassau Hall, yet another Gold Coast mansion built in 1903 for Bronson Winthrop.

In general, the preserve is filled with miles of marked and unmarked nature trails full of trees, flowers, plants, birds, reptiles, and other animals. The county's Department of Parks, Recreation, and Museums have held guided walks in the park before. The dominant soil is an acidic well drained brown loam of the Montauk series.
