= Pillsbury Winthrop Shaw Pittman =

Full-service law firm

Pillsbury Winthrop Shaw Pittman LLP
- Headquarters: New York City, U.S.
- No. of offices: 19
- No. of attorneys: Approximately 700
- Key people: David T. Dekker, chair Michael Finnegan, firm managing partner
- Date founded: 1868
- Company type: Limited liability partnership
- Website: pillsburylaw.com

Pillsbury Winthrop Shaw Pittman LLP, also known as Pillsbury, is a full-service law firm with a particular focus on the energy, financial services, real estate and technology industries. Pillsbury counsels clients on global business, regulatory and litigation matters.

It has approximately 700 attorneys operating from 20 offices in the U.S., London and Asia. The firm has connections to the two main political parties in the United States.

The law firm's two oldest predecessor firms were founded in New York City in 1868 and in San Francisco in 1874, following the California gold rush. The San Francisco firm helped create a number of new West Coast businesses including Chevron and Pacific Bell (now known as AT&T). In the 2000s, Pillsbury has become an advocate of labor outsourcing as a means of firms cutting costs by offering services to both buyers and providers of outsourcing services.

== History ==
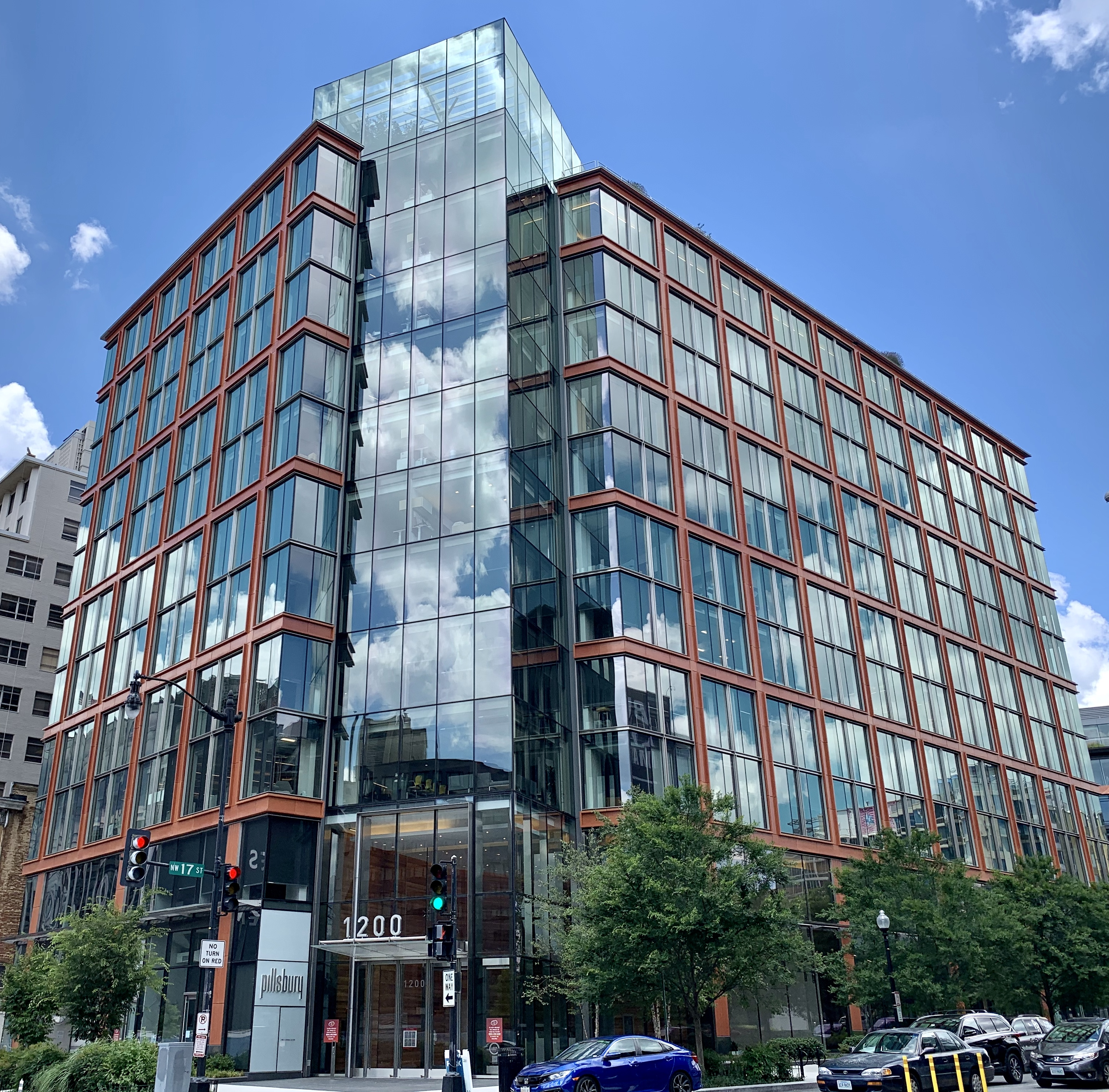
Pillsbury offices in Washington, D.C.

Predecessor firm Pillsbury, Madison & Sutro opened in San Francisco in 1874, making Pillsbury the second oldest "powerhouse" law firm in California, after Orrick, Herrington & Sutcliffe. In 1900, Pillsbury incorporated Standard Oil of California—the company would later become Chevron, which has remained one of the firm's longstanding clients. Pillsbury managed Chevron's then-record $13.2 billion cash merger with Gulf Oil in 1984, its 2001 merger with Texaco and its 2005 acquisition of Unocal Corp.

Pillsbury is the result of several law firm mergers. In 1990, Pillsbury, Madison & Sutro merged with Los Angeles–based Lillick & McHose, and then in 1996 with Washington, D.C.–based Cushman Darby & Cushman. In 2001, the firm merged with Winthrop, Stimson, Putnam & Roberts of New York City (Winthrop Stimson's predecessor was founded in 1868 by future secretary of state and Nobel Peace laureate Elihu Root; another past partner was statesman Henry L. Stimson). The firm changed its name to Pillsbury Winthrop.

In 2005 Pillsbury Winthrop merged with Shaw Pittman (formerly Shaw, Pittman, Potts & Trowbridge), a 300-lawyer Washington, D.C.–based firm working in global sourcing, energy, real estate, technology and communications.

Pillsbury was involved in the drafting of the 1952 Patent Act, which serves as the basis for patent law today, and launched the first nuclear energy law practice in the U.S. in 1966. In 1968, the firm handled the formation of Intel Corporation, and in 1970, it served as counsel on the first public offering by a member of the New York Stock Exchange. In 1980, Pillsbury advised on the then-largest foreign acquisition of a U.S. bank, and in 1994, the firm registered the first trademark for a dotcom.

In 2012, the firm entered into merger discussions with Washington, D.C.–based Dickstein Shapiro, but those talks ended by early 2013.

=== 2006 layoffs ===
In April 2006, Pillsbury had a round of layoffs. These layoffs were in connection with the merger with Shaw Pitman in April 2005. The layoffs included its unofficial mascot, Martin Macy. Macy, who had started with the firm at the age 17, had been in the San Francisco office for 41 years prior to his dismissal. He was terminated from his position as messenger to save his annual salary of $34,000. At the time, the combined revenue for the partners at the firm had dropped from $780,000 to $760,000 and the firm's assets were over $6 million. To assist Macy, the legal community created a trust fund to which former co-workers, clients and other members of the legal community donated money. The San Francisco Chronicle reported that "His dismissal has become something of a cause celebre in the San Francisco legal community." By April 2007, over $230,000 had been gathered for Macy. Macy died in his sleep in February 2008.

== Offices ==
As of August 2022, Pillsbury has 20 offices in the US, China, Japan and the UK.

== Awards and recognition ==
- Named to BTI’s 2019 Power Elite list; ranked No. 12 overall based on strength of client relationships.
- In 2019, appeared for the 11th time on Working Mother’s list of the best law firms for women; selected for the publication’s inaugural Hall of Fame class.
- In 2019, achieved a perfect score on the Human Rights Campaign’s Corporate Equality Index for the 13 consecutive years.
- Named to the 2019 NAFE Top Companies for Executive Women list.
- Ranked No. 61 by The American Lawyer in its 2019 AmLaw 100 ranking of law firms by gross revenue.
- Recognized in 2018 by Financial Times Innovative Lawyers for helping clients access new markets with their work on the UAE and Turkey’s first nuclear power plant projects, and for the successful pro bono representation of a Florida transgender student in his fight to use the male bathrooms at his school. Pillsbury has been acknowledged by Financial Times for innovation every year since 2015.
- Ranked No. 26 in LatinVex’s 2018 list of the top international law firms advising in Latin America.
- In 2018, named to BTI Client Service Elite list for the 15th year in a row.
- Received 2018 Richard W. Odgers Pro Bono Partner Award from the Giffords Law Center to Prevent Gun Violence. The award recognized Pillsbury's litigation effort to compel the Department of Defense to improve reporting to the federal background checks system following the mass shooting in Sutherland Springs, Texas.
- Named a Top 10 Family-Friendly Firm by Yale Law Women in 2018.
- Named a 2017 Law Firm of the Year by Chambers Women in Law in the category of Furthering Women's Careers.
- BTI Consulting Group has named Pillsbury as one of the 25 "Most Recommended Law Firms among GCs" for more than five years in a row.
- Pillsbury has been honored with multiple accolades in China Business Law Journal’s 2025 China Business Law Awards. The firm received three practice area awards—Cross-Border Litigation, International Trade and Taxation—as well as two sector awards, recognizing its excellence in Aviation and Family Wealth Management.

== Controversy ==
=== 2009 conflict of interest misconduct ===
In 2009 a United States federal judge found misconduct by a number of lawyers regarding the conflict of interest disclosure failures by Pillsbury Winthrop in the SONICblue bankruptcy case stating "The reorganization of SONICblue, Inc. has been tragically marred by the misdeeds of professionals". Pillsbury was forced to disgorge $10 million in fees for filing a false affidavit and hiding their conflict of interest for the debtor in the bankruptcy case of SONICblue. The federal judge ordered the firm to step down citing the "complete breakdown of creditor confidence" due to the firm's failure to make a required disclosure of a conflict of interest involving a number of hedge funds. Counsel for the official creditors committee gave tacit approval of the conflict as neither law firm brought the matter to the attention of the court. Sequential conflict disclosure misconduct in the SONICblue bankruptcy case has escalated the possible consequences to Pillsbury. The lawyer representing the successor to SONICblue subsequently learned that in addition to the failure to disclose the conflict, the firm also failed to disclose their own withdrawal of funds from the Debtor during the pre-petition preference period and had petitioned the Federal Judge to refer the firm's responsible lawyers for criminal prosecution and sought $30 million in damages from Pillsbury Winthrop and associated parties on the official creditors committee as well as their counsel.

On March 29, 2018, Pillsbury Winthrop was disqualified from representing a client, Continental Service Group Inc. who collects overdue student loans. A partner had said about a competitor (Performant Financial Corp.) that it "was not a highly rated" company. However, Performant was a current client of Pillsbury Winthrop in other matters. The judge stated that the Pillsbury Winthrop's partners' statements "created a situation where he has stunted Pillsbury's ability to effectively and zealously advocate on ConServe's behalf." Pillsbury denied any wrongdoing.
