= Knollwood Estate =

Coordinates: 40.82576°N 73.53633°W

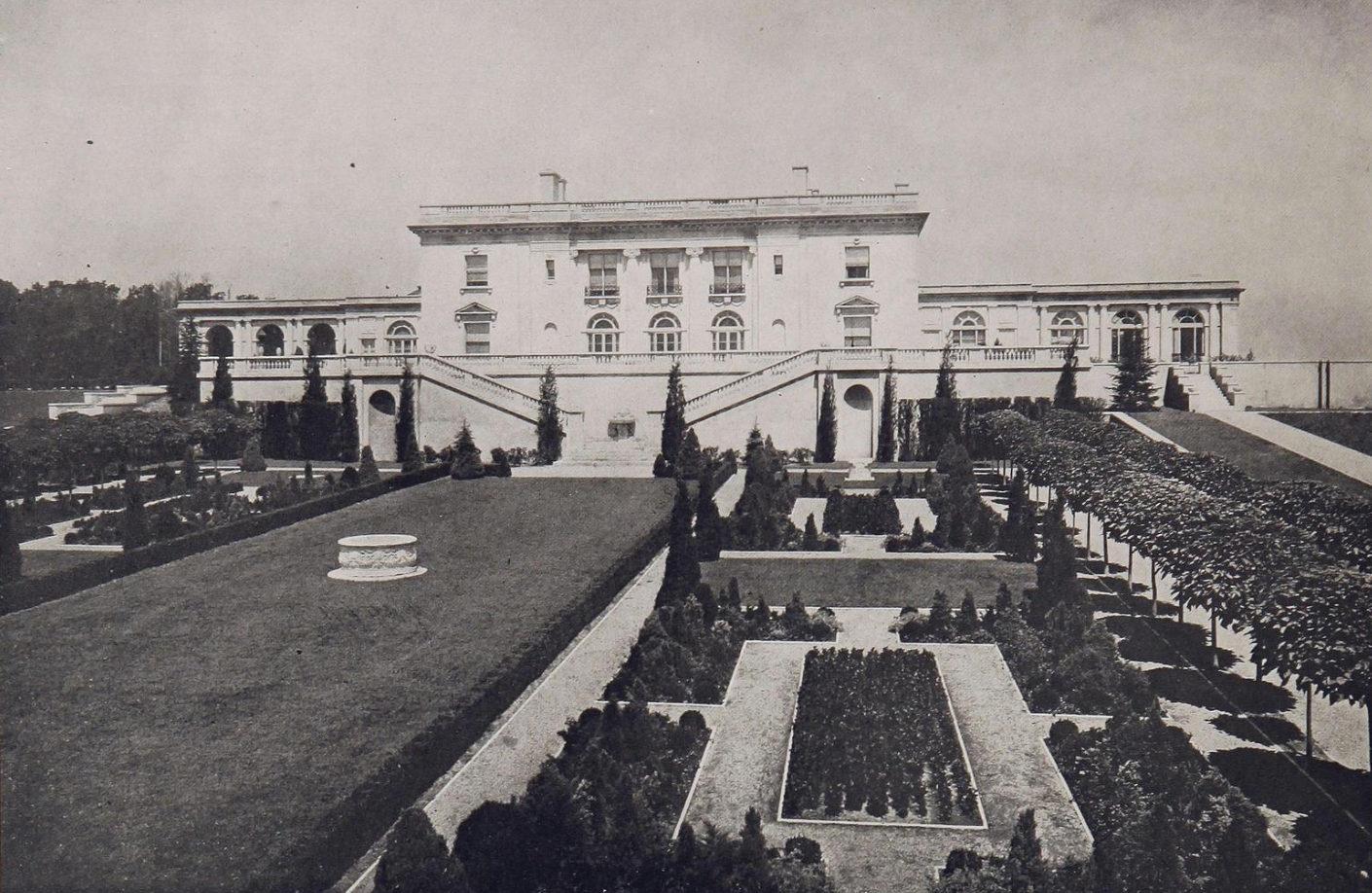
- Knollwood as pictured in September 1911
- Interactive map of Knollwood Estate
- Location: Muttontown Preserve
- Built: 1906-1920
- Built for: Charles Hudson
- Demolished: 1959

The Knollwood estate was a Gold Coast era castle-esque house and estate. Located in Muttontown, New York, U.S., its ruins are now part of the Muttontown Preserve.

== History ==
Designed by architects Hiss and Weekes, the 60-room main house was built on a 260-acre (1.1 km^{2}) plot of land which encompassed the Westbrook Farms. Built between 1906 and 1920 for Wall Street mogul and steel tycoon Charles Hudson, the huge stone mansion had classical columns and balustrades.

=== King Zog ===
In 1951, it was purchased by King Zog I of the Albanians for approximately $102,800. It was rumored that Zog bought the mansion with a bucket of diamonds and rubies. Although Zog intended the estate to be his kingdom-in-exile, staffed by Albanian subjects, he never moved in. This was due to issues in the emigration process to the United States, which caused delays for Zog. With Zog becoming ill, he was never able to move in. Rumors spread of Zog's riches being hidden in the mansion, and various looters ransacked the house, which fell into total ruin. King Zog's parliament sold the estate in 1955.

=== Demolition ===
The local county works department of Oyster Bay pulled down the ruins of the home in 1959, for reasons of safety. A garden pavilion remained for many years, progressively vandalized, until it was razed to its foundation, also for safety reasons. The most visible present remains of the estate are the remnants of a double staircase to the old formal gardens, where traces of landscaping remain, some walkways disappearing under fallen litter and leaves, the pillars and entablatures of a pair of kiosks, and the gate structure at the old entrance to the grounds.

The ruins of the mansion's gardens and grounds are now part of the Muttontown Preserve, with the gated entrance located on Jericho-Oyster Bay Road (Route 106).

== See also ==
- Gold Coast Mansions
