= Upper Brookville, New York =

- Village
- Incorporated Village of Upper Brookville
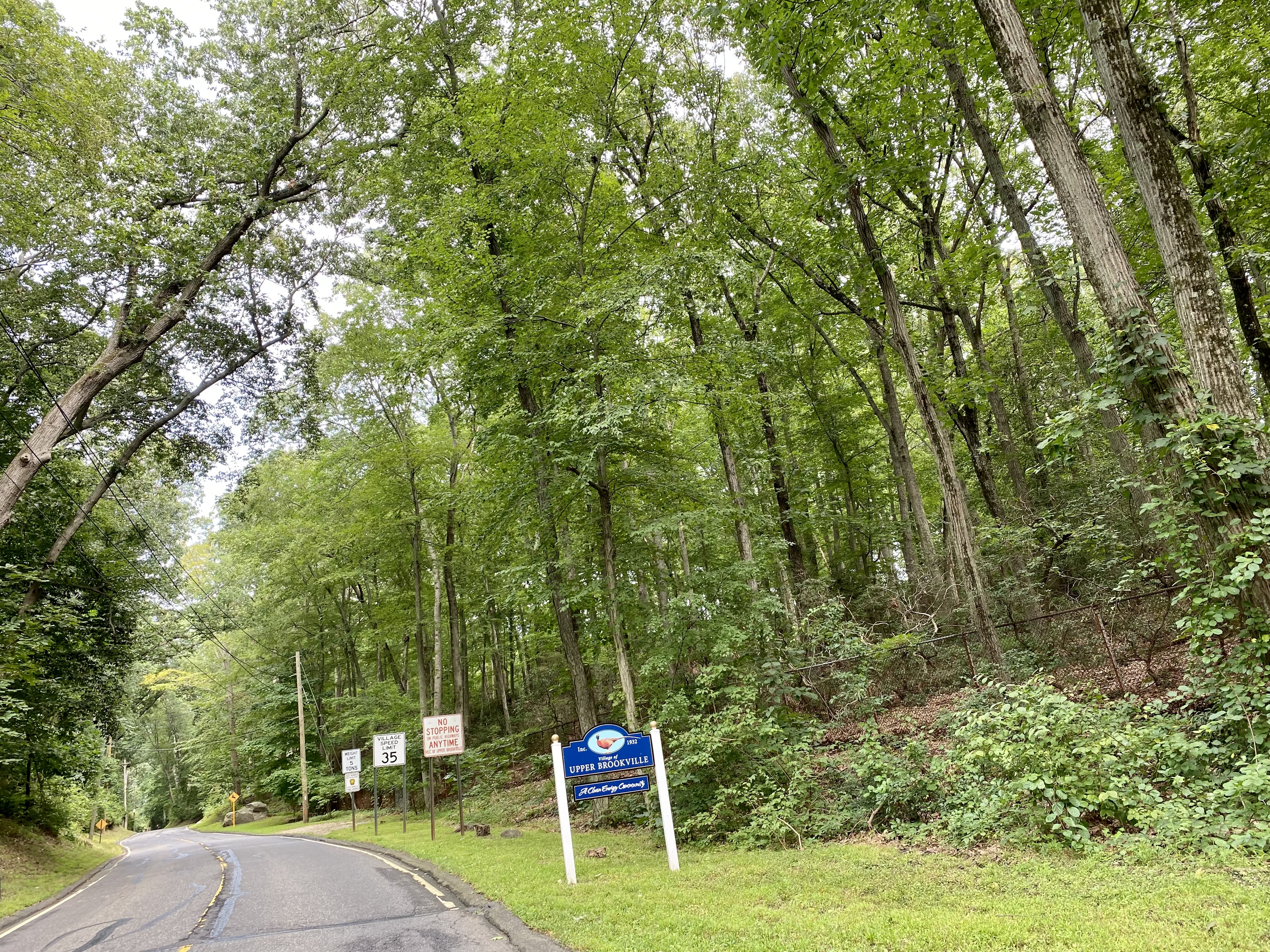
- An Upper Brookville welcome sign in 2021

- Location in Nassau County and the state of New York

- Location on Long Island Location within the state of New York
- Coordinates: 40°50′48″N 73°33′59″W
- Country: United States
- State: New York
- County: Nassau
- Town: Oyster Bay
- Incorporated: July 28, 1932

Area
  - Total: 4.30 sq mi (11.13 km^{2})
  - Land: 4.30 sq mi (11.13 km^{2})
  - Water: 0 sq mi (0.00 km^{2})
- Elevation: 157 ft (48 m)

Population (2020)
  - Total: 1,786
  - Density: 415.5/sq mi (160.42/km^{2})
- Time zone: UTC-5 (Eastern (EST))
  - Summer (DST): UTC-4 (EDT)
- ZIP Codes: 11771 (Oyster Bay); 11545 (Glen Head); 11732 (East Norwich)
- Area codes: 516, 363
- FIPS code: 36-76331
- GNIS feature ID: 0968262
- Website: upperbrookville.gov

Upper Brookville is a village located within the Town of Oyster Bay in Nassau County, on the North Shore of Long Island, in New York, United States. It is the youngest village in Oyster Bay and the second-youngest in Nassau County. The population was 1,786 at the time of the 2020 census.

== History ==
The village is named for the brook that once ran along its main road, Wolver Hollow. Although the village is physically lower than the surrounding areas, resident Hope Goddard Iselin opposed the name of Lower Brookville, stating, "I refuse to live in lower anything. If you must call it something, and I suppose you must, call it Upper Brookville." Subsequently, Upper Brookville became its name.

Upper Brookville incorporated as a village in on July 28, 1932, when eight taxpaying residents within its boundaries unanimously voted in favor of incorporation at the July 16 referendum on the matter. It was the last village in Nassau County to incorporate until Atlantic Beach – located in the Town of Hempstead – incorporated in 1962.

== Geography ==
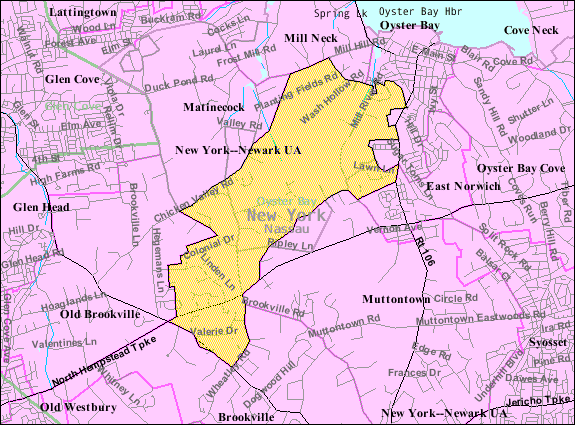
U.S. Census map of Upper Brookville

According to the United States Census Bureau, the village has a total area of 4.3 square miles (11 km^{2}), all land.

=== Climate ===
According to the Köppen climate classification, Upper Brookville has a Humid subtropical climate (type Cfa) with cool, wet winters and hot, humid summers. Precipitation is uniform throughout the year, with slight spring and fall peaks.

== Demographics ==
Historical population
Census	Pop.	Note	%±
1940	456		—
1950	469		2.9%
1960	1,045		122.8%
1970	1,182		13.1%
1980	1,245		5.3%
1990	1,453		16.7%
2000	1,801		24.0%
2010	1,698		−5.7%
2020	1,786		5.2%
U.S. Decennial Census

As of the census of 2000, there were 1,801 people, 568 households, and 483 families residing in the village. The population density was 418.5 inhabitants per square mile (161.6/km^{2}). There were 599 housing units at an average density of 139.2 per square mile (53.7/km^{2}). The racial makeup of the village was 83.23% White, 5.66% African American, 0.11% Native American, 7.22% Asian, 0.39% from other races, and 3.39% from two or more races. Hispanic or Latino of any race were 5.33% of the population.

There were 568 households, out of which 42.8% had children under the age of 18 living with them, 73.8% were married couples living together, 7.7% had a female householder with no husband present, and 14.8% were non-families. 12.7% of all households were made up of individuals, and 5.1% had someone living alone who was 65 years of age or older. The average household size was 3.14 and the average family size was 3.41.

In the village, the population was spread out, with 28.7% under the age of 18, 5.9% from 18 to 24, 24.4% from 25 to 44, 27.5% from 45 to 64, and 13.5% who were 65 years of age or older. The median age was 40 years. For every 100 females, there were 94.9 males. For every 100 females age 18 and over, there were 91.2 males.

The median income for a household in the village was $140,861, and the median income for a family was $162,799. The per capita income for the village was $65,254. About 2.2% of families and 2.5% of the population were below the poverty line, including 3.8% of those under age 18 and 3.3% of those age 65 or over.

== Notable people ==
- Henry F. Atherton, 20th century businessman.
- Francisco Rodríguez (baseball, born 1982), professional baseball player.
- Julius Erving, former Philadelphia 76ers NBA champion and New York Nets superstar, member of the Basketball Hall of Fame.
- Pia Zadora, American singer and actress.
- Edna Woolman Chase, first female editor in chief of Vogue. Chase lived on Mill River Road and wrote about the home in her book, Always in Vogue.
- Hope Goddard Iselin, American sportswoman. First woman to crew an America's Cup Race.
- Governor Nathan L. Miller and, since 1952, Russian diplomats at the Elmcroft Estate.
- Dave Gilbert, video game designer.

== See also ==
- List of municipalities in New York
- Brookville, New York
- Old Brookville, New York
- Muttontown, New York
