= Bronson Winthrop =

American philanthropist and lawyer (1863–1944)

- Born: Frederic Bronson Winthrop; December 22, 1863; Paris, France
- Died: July 14, 1944 (aged 80); Syosset, New York, U.S.
- Education: Trinity College, Cambridge; Columbia Law School
- Employer: Winthrop & Stimson
- Parent(s): Egerton Leigh Winthrop; Charlotte Troup Bronson

Frederic Bronson Winthrop (December 22, 1863 – July 14, 1944) was an American philanthropist and lawyer with Winthrop & Stimson who was prominent in New York society during the Gilded Age.

== Early life ==
Winthrop was born on December 22, 1863, in Paris, France, where his family was living during the U.S. Civil War. His parents were Egerton Leigh Winthrop and Charlotte Troup (née Bronson) Winthrop. He had two older siblings, Egerton Leigh Winthrop, Jr., a lawyer and banker in New York, and Charlotte Bronson Winthrop. His father, also a prominent lawyer, was a former president of the Knickerbocker Club.

His paternal grandparents were Benjamin Robert Winthrop and Elizabeth Ann Neilson (née Coles) Winthrop. Through his father, he was a descendant of Wait Winthrop and Joseph Dudley (both Massachusetts Bay Colony leaders), and through his great-grandmother, Judith (née Stuyvesant) Winthrop, he was a direct descendant of Peter Stuyvesant, the Director-General of New Netherland, and Robert Livingston the Elder, the 1st Lord of Livingston Manor. His maternal grandfather was Frederic Bronson and his uncle was Frederic Bronson Jr. His great-grandfather, Isaac Bronson, was a founder of the New York Life and Trust Company.

Winthrop graduated with an A.B. degree and an A.M. degree from Trinity College, Cambridge in England in 1889. In 1891, he graduated with an LL.B. degree from Columbia University.

== Career ==
Following his graduation from Columbia Law, he passed the bar and began the practice of law in New York. From 1893 until 1897, he was with the firm of Root, Howard, Winthrop & Stimson, of which Elihu Root (later a U.S. Senator, Secretary of War and Secretary of State under Theodore Roosevelt) was a partner. In 1901, he formed Winthrop & Stimson with Henry L. Stimson, who later served as Secretary of State and Secretary of War. Winthrop also served as treasurer of the New York City Bar Association.

Winthrop was a director of the Bank of the Manhattan Company, a trustee of the American Surety Company and a vice president (honorary) of the Community Service Society. In 1934, he was elected vice president of the Charity Organization Society and served in that role until 1939 when the organization joined with the New York Association for Improving the Condition of the Poor into the Community Service Society.

=== Society life ===
In 1892, Winthrop, along with his father and several members of his mother's family, was included in Ward McAllister's "Four Hundred", purported to be an index of New York's best families, published in The New York Times. Conveniently, 400 was the number of people that could fit into Mrs. Astor's ballroom.

He was a member of the Knickerbocker Club, the Union Club of the City of New York, the Century Club, the Downtown Club, the University Club of New York, the Grolier Club, the Republican Club, the Meadow Brook Golf Club, and the Piping Rock Club.

== Personal life ==
After his father's death, he inherited a one third portion of his estate, along with his brother and deceased sister's only child. He received his father's New York home and Newport cottage with his brother as tenants in common.

Winthrop, who did not marry, died at his home on Long Island on July 14, 1944. He had a townhouse in New York City at 39 East 72nd Street. Winthrop's first summer home in Muttontown, New York (within the Town of Oyster Bay), now known as Nassau Hall, was designed by Delano & Aldrich around 1904. He had the firm build him another home next door, a 12,000 square foot mansion, in 1911. The 168 acre estate was purchased by Landsdell Christie, who sold the property to Nassau County in 1968. The 1904 home is today called Nassau Hall and houses the Nassau County Museum's administrative offices.
