= Jordan Cila =

American former soccer midfielder

Personal information
- Full name: Jordan Rodin Cila
- Date of birth: April 11, 1982 (age 44)
- Place of birth: Jericho, New York, United States
- Height: 5 ft 10 in (1.78 m)
- Positions: Forward; midfielder

College career
Years	Team	Apps	(Gls)
2000–2003	Duke Blue Devils		

Senior career*
Years	Team	Apps	(Gls)
2003	Brooklyn Knights	5	(3)
2004	Colorado Rapids	21	(4)
2005	Real Salt Lake	12	(3)
2006	New York Red Bulls	4	(1)
2007	Long Island Rough Riders	4	(1)
- * Club domestic league appearances and goals

Jordan Rodin Cila (born April 11, 1982) is an American former soccer midfielder/forward. He played for the Duke Blue Devils men's soccer team, and played 39 games in Major League Soccer. He also played in the Under-17 and Under-20 United States national teams.

== Youth ==
Cila is Jewish, the son of Brazilian soccer defensive midfielder Renato Cila and Sherry Rodin who married in 1979, and the grandson of New York Arrows, Rochester Lancers and Baltimore Blast owner Bernie Rodin. His father played in the old North American Soccer League (NASL) as well as the Major Indoor Soccer League (MISL) for both the Baltimore Blast and New York Arrows in the MISL. Cila's younger siblings are Sam and Gabriella.

He was born and raised in Jericho, New York, and attended Jericho High School, for which he played soccer during his sophomore and junior years. As a junior Cila was a Parade All-American and led the team to their first-ever county finals, and in his three years playing for the team he had 67 goals and 38 assists.

Cila attended Bradenton Academy from January till December 1999, and trained at the academy with the Under-17 United States national team, with such players as Landon Donovan, DaMarcus Beasley, and Bobby Convey. He played for the United States in the 1999 FIFA U-17 World Championship in New Zealand. He also played for the Under-20 US national team.

== College ==
Afterwards, Cila opted to attend Duke University and play college soccer for the Duke Blue Devils men's soccer team while many of his teammates turned professional as teenagers. After scoring 13 goals and 9 assists during his freshman season, tying him for second on Duke's all-time freshman scoring list as he became a second team All-Atlantic Coast Conference (ACC) selection Cila's scoring output declined every year as he moved from forward to deeper and deeper midfield positions. He scored 17 goals and 26 assists in his last three seasons combined. In 2001, he was again a second team All-ACC selection, and in 2002 he led the team with 22 points and 10 assists. As a senior, he tied for second among ACC assists leaders while he had 14 points on three goals and eight assists, and he ended his career ranked number five on the all-time ACC assists list, with 35. In 76 career games, Cila had 30 goals and 95 points while helping the team reach the NCAA Division I Men's Soccer Tournament two times.

== Professional career ==
Upon graduating, Cila went undrafted in the 2004 MLS SuperDraft. He received a trial with the Colorado Rapids on the insistence of two of his former Bradenton teammates, Kyle Beckerman and Seth Trembly, and surprised coach Tim Hankinson by earning a developmental contract with the team. Cila earned playing time at his old striker position, scoring several key goals, and eventually earned a starting spot. Although he was moved further back towards the end of the season, Cila finished 2004 with 21 appearances and 15 starts, scoring four goals and two assists as one of the league's biggest rookie surprises.

Cila's old coach at Bradenton, John Ellinger, acquired him for Real Salt Lake for the club's inaugural 2005 season. He scored three goals in 12 games.

In 2006, he was sent to the New York Red Bulls, for whom he played four games scoring one goal, for a 4th round supplemental draft pick in 2006. Cila retired from playing soccer in 2006, at 24 years of age.

== Career post-soccer ==
After playing soccer, Cila has worked in interest rate sales at Goldman Sachs. In 2014, Business Insider named him one of The 20 Best Soccer Players Working In Finance. Jordan Cila is now the head of Fixed Income Sales for Americas and EMEA for Citadel Securities.

== See also ==
- List of select Jewish football (association; soccer) players
