= Harmony Heights School =

Location
- 60 Walnut Avenue; East Norwich, Nassau County, New York 11732; 40.840795°N 73.534606°W

Information
- School type: Federally funded, Private school
- Religious affiliation: Nonsectarian
- Established: 1974
- Founder: Donald Lafayette
- Status: Open
- CEEB code: 334382
- NCES School ID: 02046939
- President: Denis Garbo
- Director: Kathryn Nastri
- Principal: Tatiana Pejkovic
- Faculty: 11.6 (on an FTE basis)
- Grades: 8-12
- Gender: All Female
- Age range: 13-21
- Enrollment: 74
- Average class size: 12
- Student to teacher ratio: 6.4
- Hours in school day: 6.2
- Slogan: Hope Happens at Harmony
- Accreditation: Middle States Association
- Website: www.harmonyheights.org

Harmony Heights School is a therapeutic school for girls diagnosed with emotional issues in East Norwich, New York, United States.

Harmony Heights is a New York Department of Education-approved program and offers a New York State Regents diploma program in a therapeutic special educational setting. Founded in 1974, Harmony has assisted thousands of girls throughout the New York Metropolitan area (including Long Island, Brooklyn, Queens, Manhattan, the Bronx, Staten Island, Westchester County, and Upstate New York) in getting the help they need to heal and recover from serious emotional problems (such as severe anxiety, depression, trauma, school avoidance, and PTSD) that have interfered with or prevented them from benefiting from or attending traditional public schools. Harmony provides therapeutic and educational support systems, which include small class sizes; one-on-one, group, and family counseling; parent supports; and Therapy Dogs. Harmony has rolling admission, meaning students may transfer in at any time of year.

The school was formerly the Mabel G. Fox School.

Harmony Heights School has 75 students, ages 13 to 21, diagnosed with emotional difficulties.

Tuition and transportation costs are regularly paid for by the school district where the student lives.
