= Benjamin Moore Estate =

Historic house in New York, United States

- U.S. National Register of Historic Places
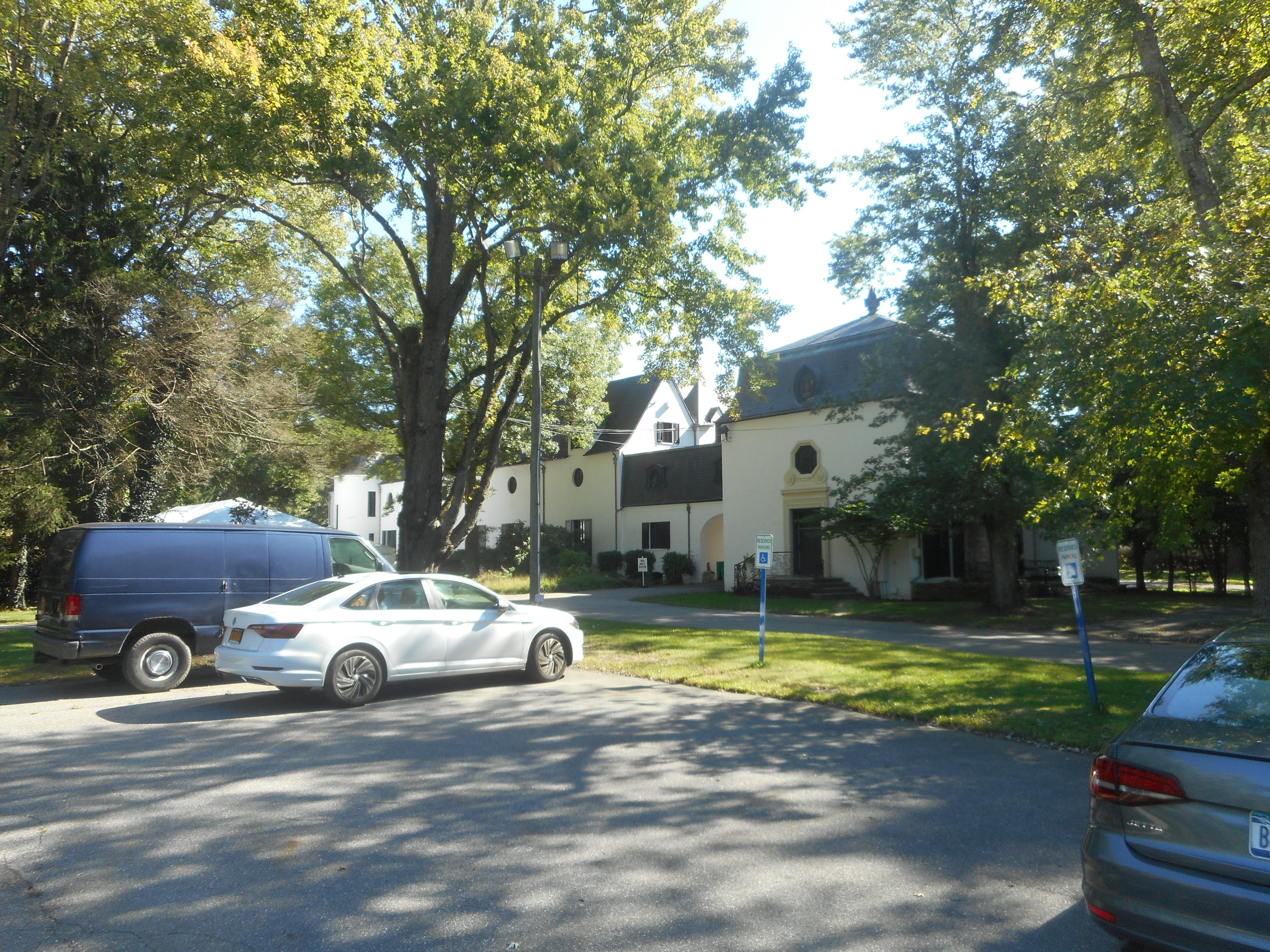
- One portion of the Benjamin Moore Estate

- Location within New York Location within the United States
- Nearest city: Muttontown, New York
- Coordinates: 40°50′19″N 73°32′17″W
- Area: 33 acres (13 ha)
- Built: 1923
- Architect: Delano, William Adams
- Architectural style: Late 19th And 20th Century Revivals, French Renaissance
- NRHP reference No.: 79001596
- Added to NRHP: May 14, 1979

The Benjamin Moore Estate, also known as Chelsea, is a historic estate located within the village of Muttontown in Nassau County, New York, United States.

== History ==
The estate was designed in 1923–1924 by architect William Adams Delano (1874–1960) for Benjamin Moore and Alexandra Emery. The manor house is an eclectic Chinese and French Renaissance style inspired dwelling. It is U-shaped, 2 1/2 stories high with hipped and gable roofs, covered with concrete block on a concrete foundation. The front facade features a steeply pitched roof, four large irregularly spaced chimneys, and a large brick tourelle with a conical roof. The property also has a contributing formal garden, gatehouse, picturesque roadways, garage, conservatory, octagonal gazebo, shed and tool house, and large open lawns.

It was listed on the National Register of Historic Places in 1979.

Today, the house and grounds are a component of the Muttontown Preserve.

== See also ==
- Nassau Hall (Muttontown, New York)
