= Jericho, New York =

- Hamlet and census-designated place
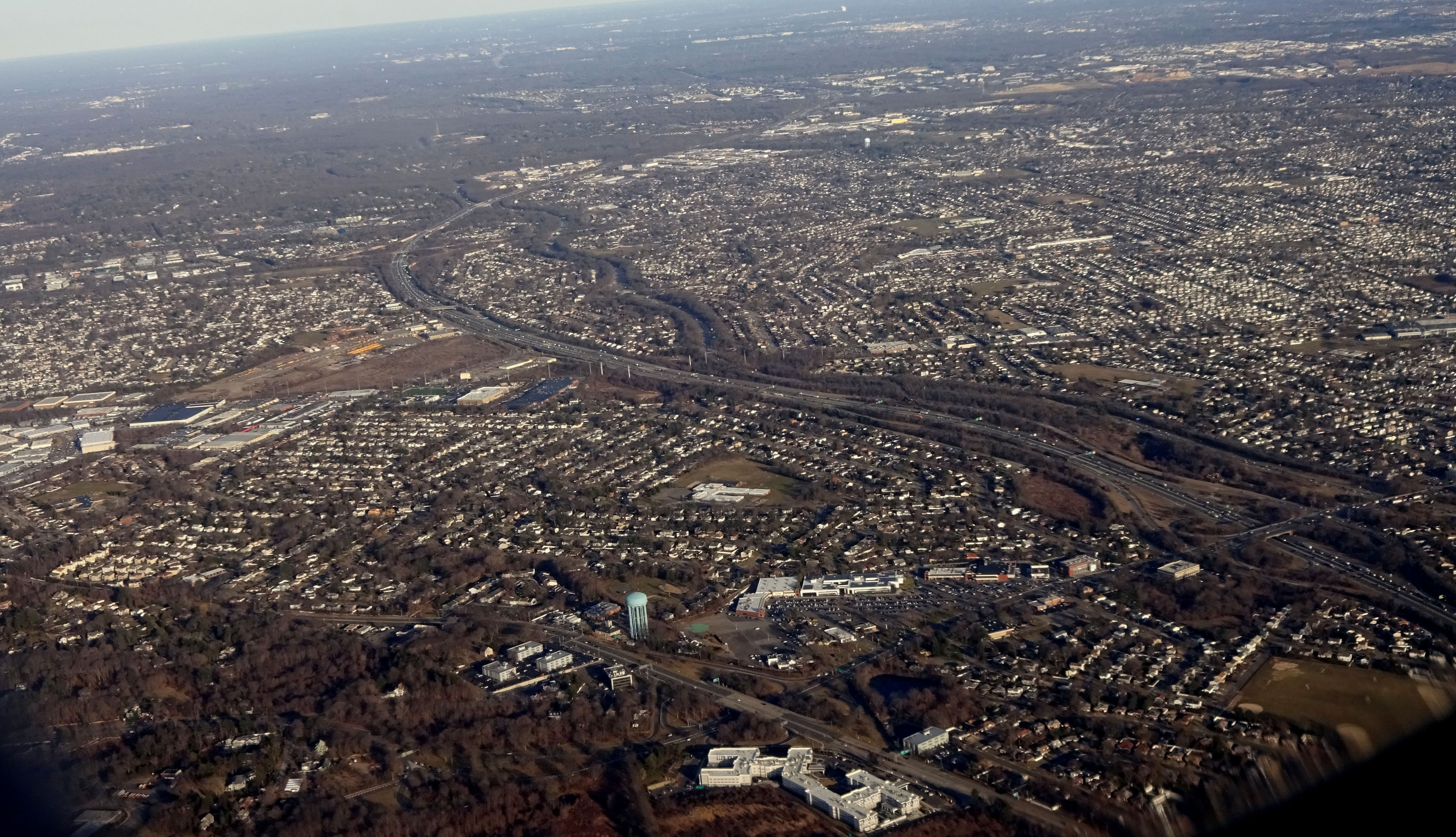
- Jericho, as seen from the air in 2020

- Location in Nassau County and the state of New York

- Location on Long Island Location within the state of New York
- Coordinates: 40°47′12″N 73°32′12″W
- Country: United States
- State: New York
- County: Nassau
- Town: Oyster Bay
- Named for: Biblical city of Jericho

Area
  - Total: 3.96 sq mi (10.26 km^{2})
  - Land: 3.96 sq mi (10.26 km^{2})
  - Water: 0 sq mi (0.00 km^{2})
- Elevation: 200 ft (60 m)

Population (2020)
  - Total: 14,808
  - Density: 3,737.6/sq mi (1,443.09/km^{2})
- Time zone: UTC-5 (Eastern (EST))
  - Summer (DST): UTC-4 (EDT)
- ZIP Codes: 11753, 11853 (Jericho); 11590 (Westbury); 11801 (Hicksville)
- Area codes: 516, 363
- FIPS code: 36-38539
- GNIS feature ID: 0954000

Jericho /dʒɛrɪkoʊ/ is a hamlet and census-designated place (CDP) located within the Town of Oyster Bay in Nassau County, on the North Shore of Long Island, in New York, United States, approximately 29 miles (47 km) east of Midtown Manhattan. The population was 14,808 at the time of the 2020 census.

The area is served by the Jericho Union Free and the Syosset Central School Districts, the boundaries of which differ somewhat from those of the hamlet. The boundaries of the Jericho Post Office vary from both the hamlet and the school district boundaries, including a portion of Jericho in the Westbury ZIP code and a portion of Syosset in the Jericho ZIP code.

== History ==
Located in the Town of Oyster Bay, Jericho was part of the Robert Williams Plantation in 1648. The English families who settled in Jericho were, or soon became, Quakers, members of the Society of Friends. Many fled from persecution in England and in the New England Colonies. They sought a peaceful existence as farmers. The name of the area was changed in 1692 from Lusum to Jericho after the town in the Middle East near the Jordan River mentioned in the Bible as part of the Promised Land.

The Census of slaves, conducted in the Province of New York in 1755, contains a long list of enslaved individuals in Oyster Bay, including the hamlets of Jericho and what is now North Hempstead. It is followed by a remarkable additional list of "free Negroes Melattoes [people of Afro-European ancestry] and Mustees [people of Afro-Indigenous ancestry] Resideing within ye Township of Oysterbay that may probably Be Likely In case of Insurrections To be as Mischevious as ye Slaves." (Free individuals were not supposed to be reported for the Census; a local militia captain supplied it on his own initiative, with the expectation "that ye Other Captains in Oysterbay will acquaint Your Honour [governor of New York] of those Resideing in ye Other parts of ye Township.")

During the Revolutionary War, the British occupation of Long Island brought hardship to local Quakers; they were compelled to board soldiers in their homes even as they maintained their pacifist stance. Once peace returned, Jericho flourished again. A Quaker school was built in 1793, and the Charity Society of Jericho and Westbury was established in 1794. The Friends Meeting House, built in 1788, still stands and is still in use in the 21st century. Slavery was abolished locally in 1817, with the help of Elias Hicks. (A Hempstead carpenter, Hicks had moved to his wife’s family's farm in Jericho in 1771, where he became a noted preacher of Quaker doctrine.)

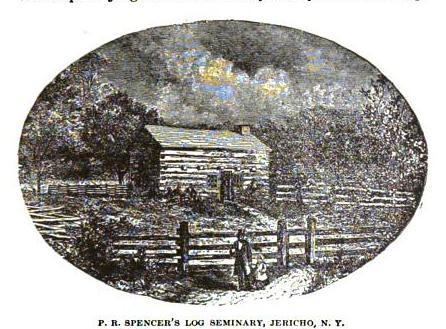
Platt Rogers Spencer's Log Seminary in Jericho, New York

A post office was established in 1802, a cider mill in the mid-19th century, and the first public elementary school (known as the Cedar Swamp School) in 1905. Improvements to infrastructure were made with the founding of the Jericho Water District in 1923. As the population increased, a Volunteer Fire Department established in 1938, and a new elementary school was built in 1953 (Robert Seaman School). The population kept increasing until the last elementary schools in Jericho were built, the George A. Jackson Elementary School in 1957, the now closed Robert Williams School in 1961 and the Cantiague School in 1963.

After World War II, in the 1950s Phebe Underhill Seaman sold a large piece of her land to real estate developers. This property was developed for new suburban housing. The water tower was erected in 1952. In 1958 the NY Department of Transportation demolished "Old Jericho" to widen Broadway, Routes 106/107, and to put in a cloverleaf access to Jericho Turnpike. New grade schools and a high school were added to the community along with a shopping center, a new post office, new fire department and a public library.

Also in Jericho is the Theatre at Westbury – originally established in 1956 as the Westbury Music Fair.

=== Underground Railroad ===
The building in Jericho now known as One North was built in 1789, as the home for the prominent Quaker and abolitionist Valentine Hicks, his wife Abigail, and their children. Hicks' father-in-law, Elias Hicks, "had been the spark that helped convince Quakers and other like-minded people after the Revolutionary War that all men were created equal – including people of color who were enslaved". Valentine Hicks was also an Underground Railroad station master; in his home – a key way station, a removable panel behind an upstairs linen closet concealed a staircase to the attic where Hicks hid runaways until the coast was clear. The Town of Oyster Bay designated the site as a historic town landmark in 2012. In 2015, partial demolition of the Maine Maid Inn took place without the Oyster Bay Landmark Commission's approval, which outraged many preservationists.

== Geography ==
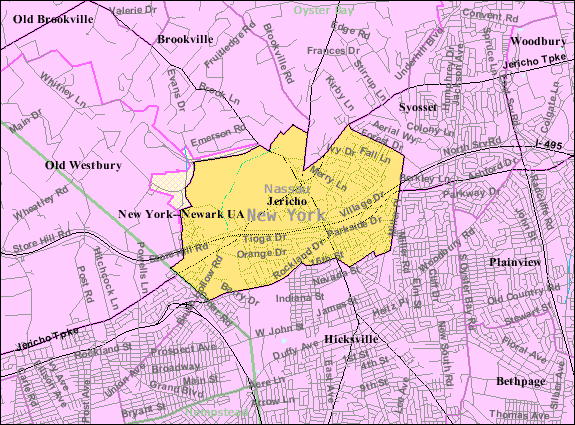
U.S. census map of Jericho

According to the United States Census Bureau, the CDP has a total area of 4.1 square miles (11 km^{2}), all land.

There is another community known as Jericho in New York, located in the extreme northern corner of the state, in the Town of Altona, Clinton County.

The main entrance to SUNY Old Westbury is located within Jericho.

=== Climate ===
Under the Köppen climate classification, Jericho lies in the transition zone between a humid subtropical climate (Cfa) and a hot-summer humid continental climate (Dfa). Accordingly, summers are usually hot and humid with occasional thunderstorms, winters are usually cool with snow and rain, and the spring and fall typically feature mild weather.

The average monthly temperatures in the hamlet range from 30.9 °F in January to 74.7 °F in July. The local hardiness zone is 7a.

=== Greater Jericho area ===
Jericho consists of three villages and one unincorporated hamlet:

- Jericho
- Brookville
- Upper Brookville
- Old Brookville (part, with Greater Glen Cove).

== Demographics ==
Historical population
Census	Pop.	Note	%±
2000	13,045		—
2010	13,567		4.0%
2020	14,808		9.1%
U.S. Decennial Census

=== Racial and ethnic composition ===
Jericho CDP, New York – Racial and ethnic composition Note: the US Census treats Hispanic/Latino as an ethnic category. This table excludes Latinos from the racial categories and assigns them to a separate category. Hispanics/Latinos may be of any race.
Race / Ethnicity (NH = Non-Hispanic)	Pop 2000	Pop 2010	Pop 2020	% 2000	% 2010	% 2020
White alone (NH)	11,034	9,297	6,369	84.58%	68.53%	43.01%
Black or African American alone (NH)	179	247	301	1.37%	1.82%	2.03%
Native American or Alaska Native alone (NH)	4	4	7	0.03%	0.03%	0.05%
Asian alone (NH)	1,387	3,442	7,168	10.63%	25.37%	48.41%
Native Hawaiian or Pacific Islander alone (NH)	1	0	3	0.01%	0.00%	0.02%
Other race alone (NH)	8	22	77	0.06%	0.16%	0.52%
Mixed race or Multiracial (NH)	114	154	288	0.87%	1.14%	1.94%
Hispanic or Latino (any race)	318	401	595	2.44%	2.96%	4.02%
Total	13,045	13,567	14,808	100.00%	100.00%	100.00%

=== 2020 census ===
As of the 2020 census, Jericho had a population of 14,808. The median age was 44.3 years. 24.8% of residents were under the age of 18 and 19.0% were 65 years of age or older. For every 100 females, there were 96.0 males, and for every 100 females age 18 and over, there were 91.7 males age 18 and over.

100.0% of residents lived in urban areas, while 0.0% lived in rural areas.

There were 4,597 households in Jericho, of which 43.8% had children under the age of 18 living in them. Of all households, 72.1% were married-couple households, 9.0% were households with a male householder and no spouse or partner present, and 16.6% were households with a female householder and no spouse or partner present. About 12.6% of all households were made up of individuals, and 7.2% had someone living alone who was 65 years of age or older.

There were 4,818 housing units, of which 4.6% were vacant. The homeowner vacancy rate was 1.1% and the rental vacancy rate was 8.9%.

=== 2000 census ===
At the 2000 census there were 13,045 people in 4,545 households, including 3,813 families, in the CDP. The population density was 3,214.1 inhabitants per square mile (1,241.0/km^{2}). There were 4,600 housing units at an average density of 1,133.4 per square mile (437.6/km^{2}). The racial makeup of the CDP was 86.36% White, 10.69% Asian, 1.42% African American, 0.03% Native American, 0.01% Pacific Islander, 0.51% from other races, and 0.98% from two or more races. Hispanic or Latino residents of any race were 2.44%.

Of the 4,545 households 38.6% had children under the age of 18 living with them, 74.8% were married couples living together, 7.1% had a female householder with no husband present, and 16.1% were non-families. 13.7% of households were one person and 6.1% were one person aged 65 or older. The average household size was 2.81 and the average family size was 3.08.

The age distribution was 25.3% under the age of 18, 4.6% from 18 to 24, 25.4% from 25 to 44, 28.4% from 45 to 64, and 16.4% 65 or older. The median age was 42 years. For every 100 females, there were 94.3 males. For every 100 females age 18 and over, there were 90.2 males.

=== Income and poverty ===
The median household income was $171,743 and the median family income was $239,626. The per capita income for the CDP was $76,646. About 2.7% of families and 4.7% of the population were below the poverty line, including 4.8% of those under age 18 and 5.2% of those age 65 or over.

=== Demographic trends ===
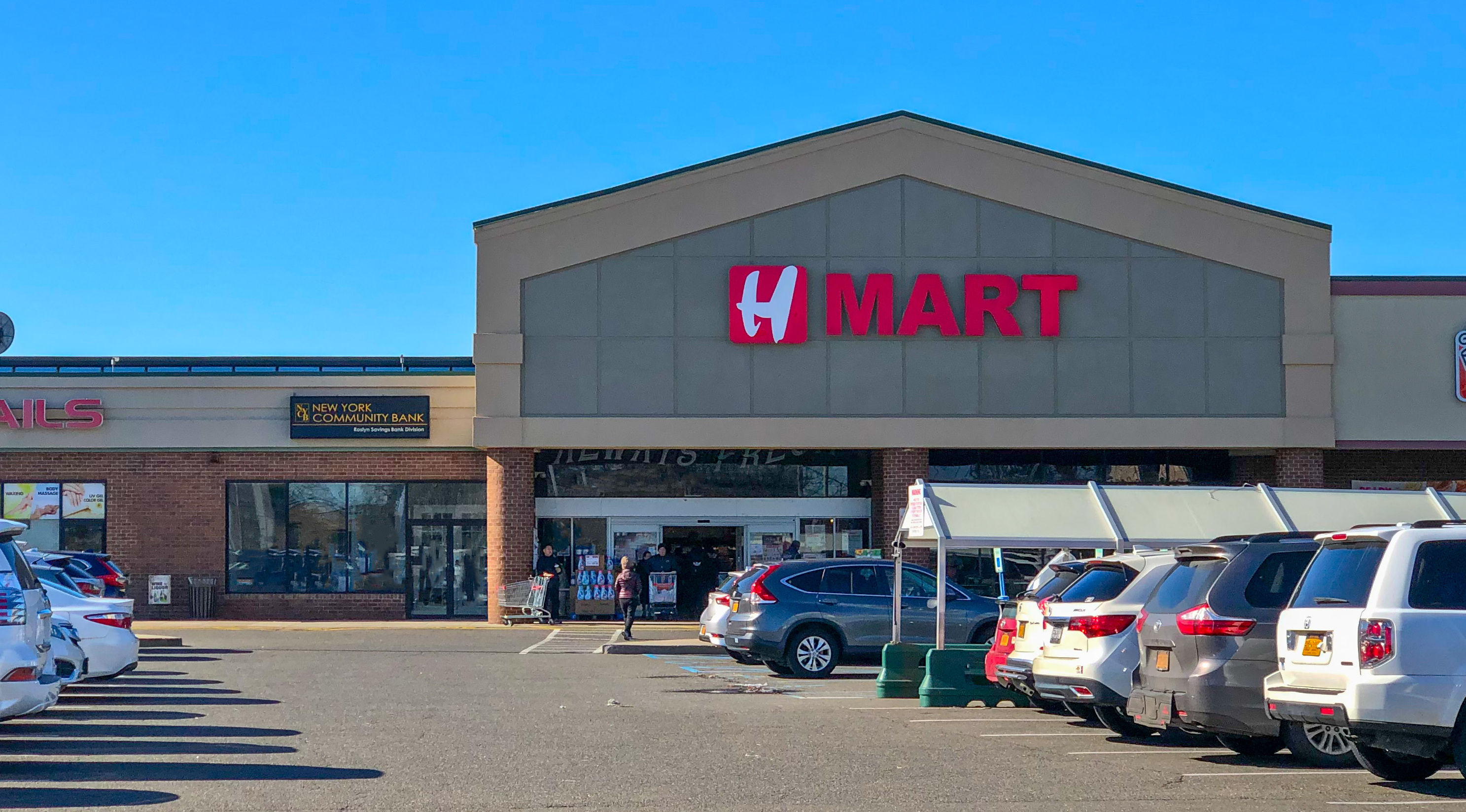
H Mart in Jericho

Jericho, like many other places in northern Nassau County, has historically had a large Jewish population. During the 2010s, Jericho saw an influx of residents of East Asian background, drawn by its prestigious public school district and high quality of life. In 2020, Asians made up nearly 70% of students in Jericho Union Free School District, up from 33% in 2010.

== Economy ==
Aer Lingus, the flag carrier of Ireland, operates its U.S. office in Jericho. Nathan's Famous is headquartered in Wing A of the second floor of One Jericho Plaza, in Jericho.

Publishers Clearing House moved its headquarters to Jericho in 2017.

Nationwide TFS, the top provider of personal payment solutions for Chapter 13, was founded in Jericho in 2011.

Many retail and industrial businesses operate along Cantiague Rock Road in the Jericho Gardens section of the CDP.

As of 2024, the average home price in Jericho was $1,083,413, compared to a New York state average of $453,138; the average listing price for a home was $1,276,833, compared to a New York state average of $406,667. Jericho home prices tend to be extremely high relative to their size or quality, due to the strong desire of many homebuyers to reside in homes zoned for the nationally renowned Jericho Union Free School District. Homes located within the boundaries of the Jericho school district are often several hundreds of thousands of dollars more expensive than similarly sized homes located just outside it.

== Notable people ==
Harry Chapin

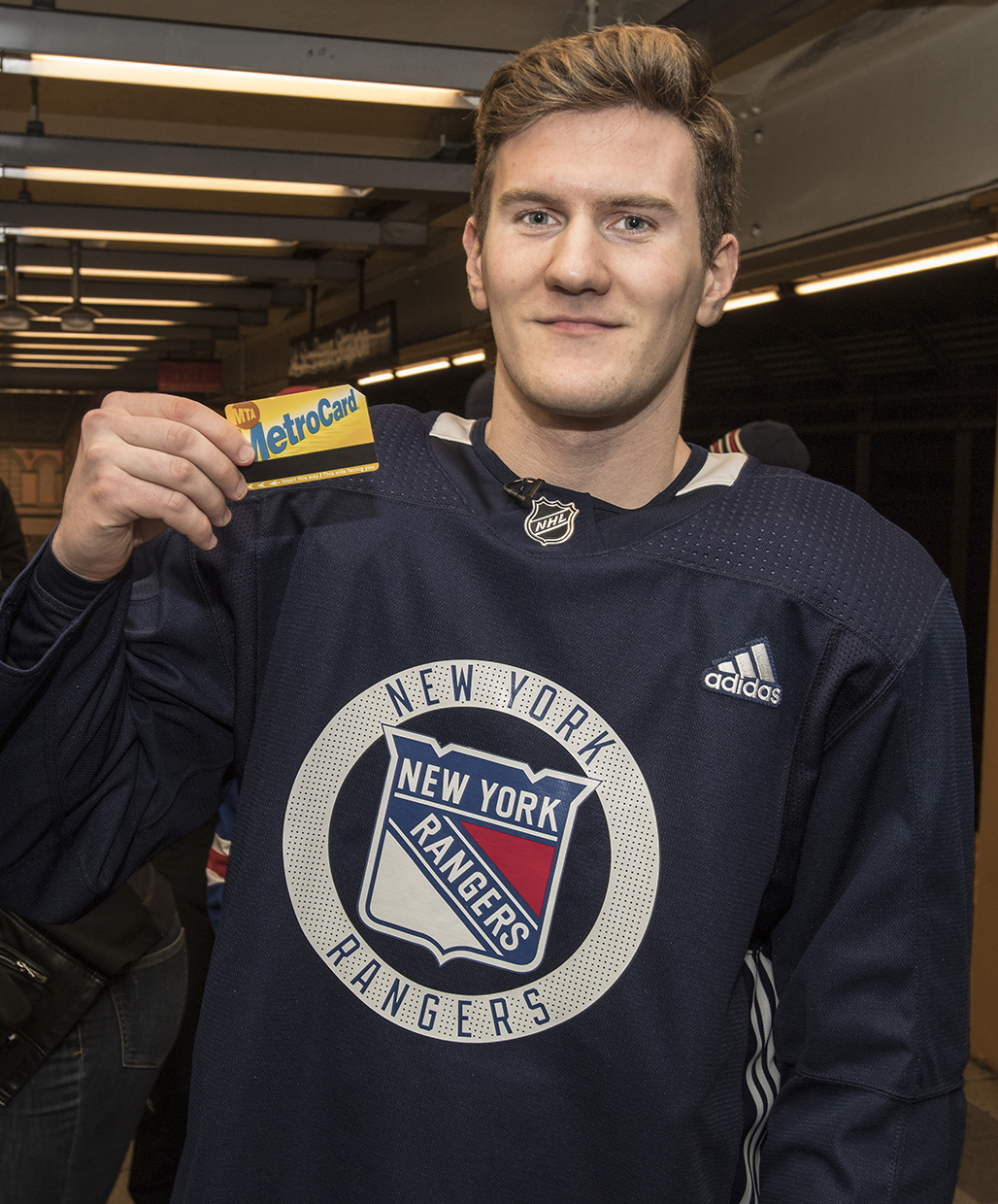
Adam Fox

- Tyler Alvarez, actor
- Madison Beer, singer
- David Carol, photographer
- Harry Chapin, singer/songwriter/storyteller (had a fatal automobile accident in Jericho)
- Jordan Cila, soccer player
- Adam Felber, author, radio personality
- Adam Fox, professional ice hockey defenseman and Norris Trophy winner for the New York Rangers of the National Hockey League
- Stephanie Klein, writer
- Donny Lia, racing driver
- Matt Litwin, musician, founder of band Bulletproof Messenger
- Howard Lutnick, businessman and CEO of Cantor Fitzgerald and United States Secretary of Commerce
- PH-1, rapper
- Natalie Portman, actress
- Miroslav Šatan, retired professional hockey player
- Jay Sekulow, attorney and presidential advisor
- Adrienne Shelly, actress
- Jamie-Lynn Sigler, who played Meadow Soprano on the HBO series The Sopranos.

== See also ==
- List of Census-designated places in New York
- Jericho Turnpike
