= Winthrop, Stimson, Putnam & Roberts =

Defunct American law firm

- Headquarters: New York City
- No. of offices: 5
- Offices: New York City, Tokyo, London, Hong Kong, and Singapore
- Date founded: 1868
- Dissolved: 2001 (merged with Pillsbury, Madison & Sutro)

Winthrop, Stimson, Putnam & Roberts was a prominent New York City law firm that traced its origins to a law partnership formed there in 1868. It merged with San Francisco–based law firm Pillsbury, Madison & Sutro in 2001. The merged firm subsequently became Pillsbury Winthrop Shaw Pittman in 2005.

== History ==
The firm was founded in 1868 as Root & Clarke. After several name changes, and the addition of Bronson Winthrop, it was known as Winthrop & Stimson after 1898, and Winthrop, Stimson, Putnam & Roberts after 1927. The firm represented clients including W. E. B. Du Bois, America West Airlines, Zapata Petroleum, Clark Estates Inc., and Ethyl Corporation, among others.

In 1980, the firm published Winthrop, Stimson, Putnam & Roberts: A History of a Law Firm.

Immediately prior to its 2001 merger, Winthrop had offices in Tokyo, London, Hong Kong, and Singapore with more than half of the firm's revenue coming from abroad. The 2001 merger with Pillsbury, Madison & Sutro, which was then twice the size of New York City-based Winthrop, Stimson, Putnam & Roberts, created one of the largest law firms in the country with more than 860 lawyers in 16 offices. As of 2000, Pillsbury had been headquartered in San Francisco for 126 years.

In 2005, the Pillsbury Winthrop LLP firm merged with Shaw Pittman LLP forming a new entity, known as Pillsbury Winthrop Shaw Pittman LLP, with over 900 lawyers.

== Notable alumni ==
The firm produced a number of leaders in law, jurisprudence and public service, including:

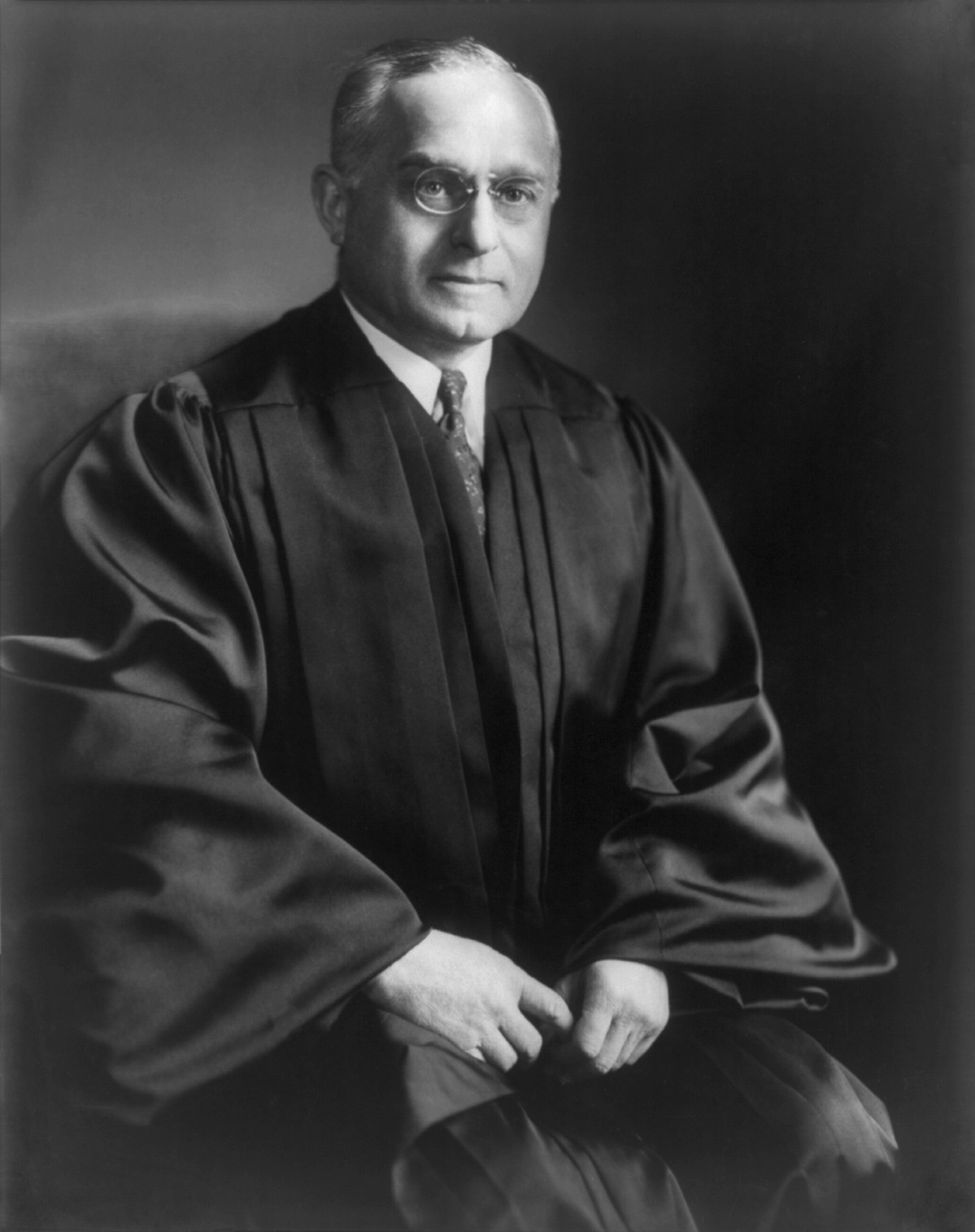
Felix Frankfurter, a U.S. Supreme Court justice, worked at the firm.

- Felix Frankfurter (1882–1965), legal scholar and U.S. Supreme Court Justice
- Charles Nourse (1888–1974), football player and lawyer
- John Edward Parsons (1829–1915), president of the New York City Bar Association
- Elihu Root (1845–1937), one of the firm's founders and a U.S. Secretary of State
- Raymond P. Shafer (1917–2006), 39th governor of Pennsylvania
- Sargent Shriver (1915–2011), director of the Office of Economic Opportunity and the U.S. Ambassador to France
- Henry L. Stimson (1867–1950), cabinet member under four Presidents of the United States
- Brooks Thomas (1931–2010), lawyer and executive of Harper & Row
- Bronson Winthrop (1863–1944), one of the firm's founders
