= Jericho Union Free School District =

School district in the state of New York

Location
- Nassau, New York, 11753; United States

District information
- Type: Public
- Grades: K–12
- Superintendent: Robert L. Kravitz, Ed.D., M.B.A.
- Asst. superintendent(s): David Cohen, Victor Manuel, Ivy Sherman
- Schools: 5

Other information
- Website: www.jerichoschools.org

The Jericho Union Free School District (commonly known as the Jericho School District or Jericho UFSD) is an American public school district in Jericho, New York. It was founded in 1959 with the completion of Jericho High School. The district contains three elementary schools, one middle school and one high school, serving students in grades K–12. The Jericho School District is regarded as one of top performing school systems in the country, and as of 2026 was ranked the #1 public school district in New York and #5 in the United States by Niche. The Jericho School District's current Superintendent of Schools is Henry L. Grishman.

== Overview ==
Jericho has long been renowned for its high quality public school system. As of 2026, it was ranked the #1 public school district in New York and #5 in the United States by Niche.

== Administration ==
The Jericho School District's current Superintendent of Schools is Robert L. Kravitz, Ed.D., M.B.A. Other administrators of the Jericho Union Free School District include:

- Mr. David Cohen, Assistant Superintendent for Human Resources
- Victor Manuel, Assistant Superintendent for Business Affairs
- Dr. Iman Sherman, Assistant Superintendent for Curriculum & Instruction
- Dr. Joseph Sapien, Principal of Cantiague Elementary School
- Dr. Alex Rivere, Principal of George A. Jackson Elementary School
- Joanna Kletter, Principal of Jeffrey Ratner-Robert Seaman Elementary School

== Board of Education ==
As of the 2025–2026 school year, the Jericho School District Board of Education is as follows:

- Samuel Perlman, President (Term expires 2027)
- Jennifer Vartanov, Vice President (Term expires 2027)
- Kenny Jin, Trustee (Term expires 2028)
- Jill Citron, Trustee(Term expires 2026)
- Dr. Divya Balachandar, Trustee (Term expires 2026)

Throughout the year, there are regularly scheduled monthly school board meetings and work sessions. They are open to the public and frequently include presentations on educational activities and initiatives. Executive sessions are also held, which are private, closed meetings.

== Budget ==
For 2012-2013, Jericho Public School district spent a total of US$1114,468,464 for a projected number of 3004 students. US$38,105 will be spent per student, which is US$457,264 for a student studying for 12 years from Grade 1 to 12, or US$914,528 for a household with 2 students.

In 2011-2012, Jericho Public School district spent a total of US$111,962,251 for 3026 students of K-12. US$37,000 was spent per student, which is US$444,000 for a student studying for 12 years from Grade 1 to 12, or US$888,000 for a household with 2 students.

== Middle School Soccer Team ==
During the 2026 fall sports season, the soccer team team lost 2-3 against the Roslyn soccer team.

== Schools ==
- Jericho Senior High School (Grades 9–12)
- Jericho Middle School (Grades 6–8)
- Cantiague Elementary School (Grades K–5)
- George A. Jackson Elementary School (Grades K-5)
- Jeffrey Ratner-Robert Seaman Elementary School (Grades K–5)
