= Muttontown, New York =

- Village
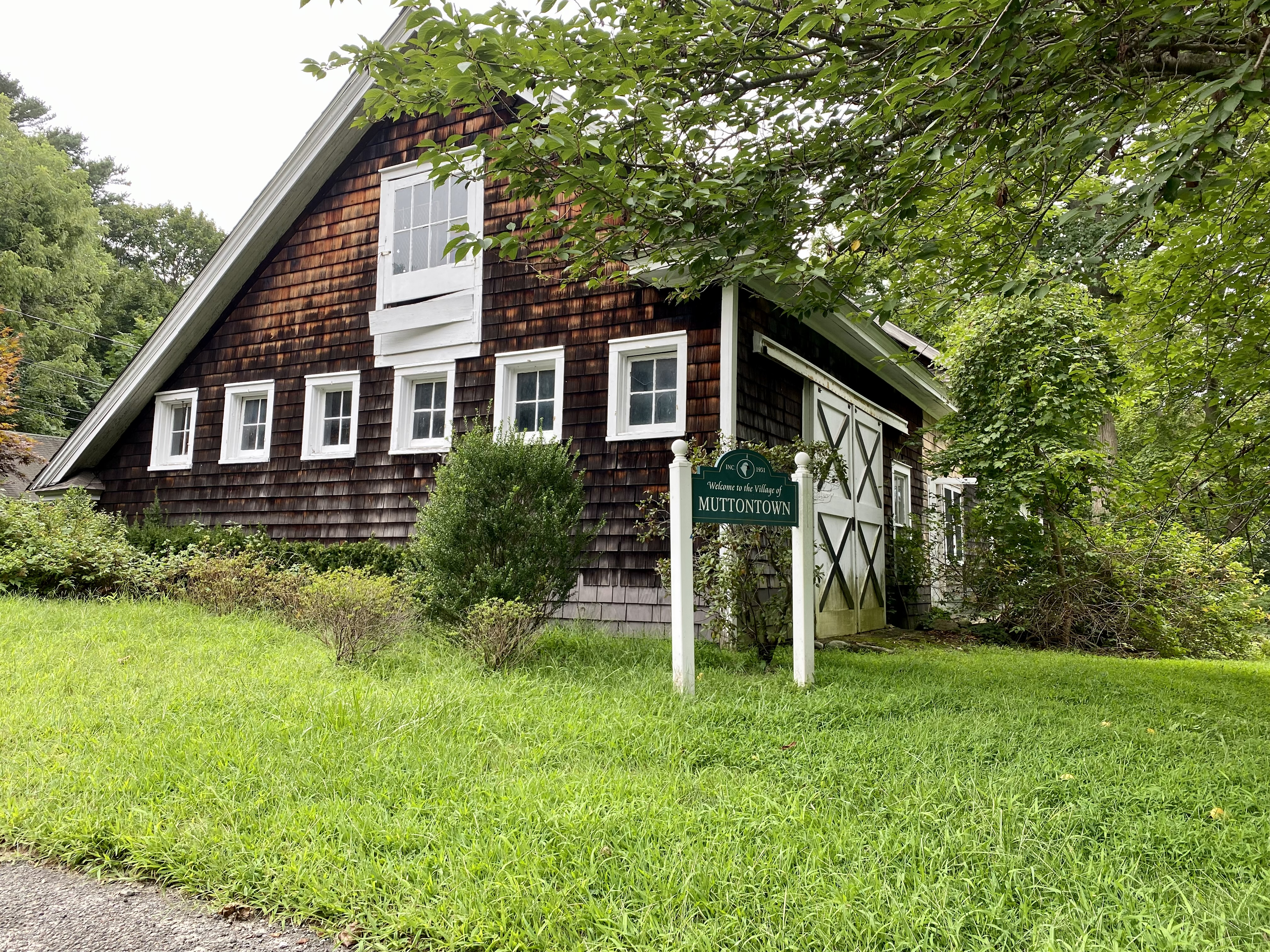
- The Muttontown Village Hall Complex in 2021

- Location in Nassau County and the state of New York

- Location on Long Island Location within the state of New York
- Coordinates: 40°49′20″N 73°31′37″W
- Country: United States
- State: New York
- County: Nassau
- Town: Oyster Bay
- Incorporated: 1931
- Named for: The area's historic use as a mutton (sheep) pasture

Government
  - Mayor: James Ligouri
  - Deputy Mayor: Sudha Prasad

Area
  - Total: 6.06 sq mi (15.69 km^{2})
  - Land: 6.06 sq mi (15.69 km^{2})
  - Water: 0 sq mi (0.00 km^{2})
- Elevation: 285 ft (87 m)

Population (2020)
  - Total: 3,512
  - Density: 579.8/sq mi (223.87/km^{2})
- Time zone: UTC−5 (Eastern (EST))
  - Summer (DST): UTC−4 (EDT)
- ZIP Codes: 11791 (Syosset); 11732 (East Norwich); 11771 (Oyster Bay); 11545 (Glen Head); 11753 (Jericho)
- Area codes: 516, 363
- FIPS code: 36-49330
- GNIS feature ID: 0958224
- Website: www.muttontownny.gov

Muttontown is a village located within the Town of Oyster Bay in Nassau County, on Long Island, in New York, United States. it is considered part of the Greater Syosset area, which is anchored by Syosset. The population was 3,512 at the time of the 2020 census.

== History ==
The area historically was inhabited by the Matinecock Native Americans, and European colonists began to settle in the area during the 1600s. During colonial times, the area was used to raise sheep for wool and meat.

Muttontown incorporated as a village in 1931. The name of the village stems from its former use as pasturage for sheep.

Zog of Albania bought the local Knollwood Estate in 1951, but sold it in 1955. The Benjamin Moore Estate was listed on the National Register of Historic Places in 1979.

== Geography ==
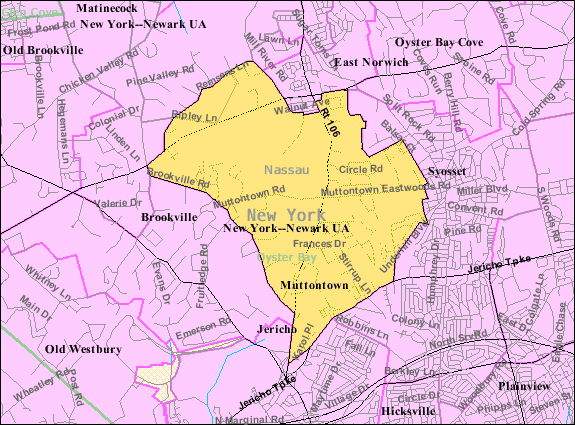
U.S. Census map of Muttontown

According to the United States Census Bureau, the village has a total area of 6.1 square miles (16 km^{2}), all land.

The village lost some territory between the 2000 and 2010 censuses to Syosset.

== Demographics ==
Historical population
Census	Pop.	Note	%±
1940	335		—
1950	382		14.0%
1960	1,265		231.2%
1970	2,081		64.5%
1980	2,725		30.9%
1990	3,024		11.0%
2000	3,412		12.8%
2010	3,497		2.5%
2020	3,512		0.4%
U.S. Decennial Census

=== Racial and ethnic composition ===
Muttontown village, New York – Racial and ethnic composition Note: the US Census treats Hispanic/Latino as an ethnic category. This table excludes Latinos from the racial categories and assigns them to a separate category. Hispanics/Latinos may be of any race.
Race / Ethnicity (NH = Non-Hispanic)	Pop 2000	Pop 2010	Pop 2020	% 2000	% 2010	% 2020
White alone (NH)	2,662	2,485	2,027	78.02%	71.06%	57.72%
Black or African American alone (NH)	60	54	54	1.76%	1.54%	1.54%
Native American or Alaska Native alone (NH)	0	5	1	0.00%	0.14%	0.03%
Asian alone (NH)	546	794	1,189	16.00%	22.71%	33.86%
Native Hawaiian or Pacific Islander alone (NH)	0	0	5	0.00%	0.00%	0.14%
Other race alone (NH)	6	9	10	0.18%	0.26%	0.28%
Mixed race or Multiracial (NH)	60	31	67	1.76%	0.89%	1.91%
Hispanic or Latino (any race)	78	119	159	2.29%	3.40%	4.53%
Total	3,412	3,497	3,512	100.00%	100.00%	100.00%

=== 2020 census ===
As of the 2020 census, Muttontown had a population of 3,512. The median age was 47.1 years. 20.7% of residents were under the age of 18 and 20.3% of residents were 65 years of age or older. For every 100 females there were 100.2 males, and for every 100 females age 18 and over there were 97.9 males age 18 and over.

90.9% of residents lived in urban areas, while 9.1% lived in rural areas.

There were 1,057 households in Muttontown, of which 34.5% had children under the age of 18 living in them. Of all households, 78.0% were married-couple households, 9.1% were households with a male householder and no spouse or partner present, and 11.7% were households with a female householder and no spouse or partner present. About 10.2% of all households were made up of individuals and 6.4% had someone living alone who was 65 years of age or older.

There were 1,141 housing units, of which 7.4% were vacant. The homeowner vacancy rate was 1.5% and the rental vacancy rate was 15.6%.

=== 2000 census ===
As of the census of 2000, there were 3,412 people, 1,022 households, and 920 families residing in the village. The population density was 560.5 inhabitants per square mile (216.4/km^{2}). There were 1,048 housing units at an average density of 172.1 per square mile (66.4/km^{2}). The racial makeup of the village was 79.92% White, 1.82% African American, 16.00% Asian, 0.21% from other races, and 2.05% from two or more races. Hispanic and Latino of any race were 2.29% of the population.

There were 1,022 households, out of which 47.6% had children under the age of 18 living with them, 83.6% were married couples living together, 3.5% had a female householder with no husband present, and 9.9% were non-families. 7.4% of all households were made up of individuals, and 2.5% had someone living alone who was 65 years of age or older. The average household size was 3.34 and the average family size was 3.49.

In the village, the population was spread out, with 29.9% under the age of 18, 5.7% from 18 to 24, 23.4% from 25 to 44, 31.1% from 45 to 64, and 9.8% who were 65 years of age or older. The median age was 40 years. For every 100 females, there were 95.3 males. For every 100 females age 18 and over, there were 91.7 males.

The median income for a household in the village was in excess of $200,000. Males had a median income of $100,000 versus $53,846 for females. The per capita income for the village was $88,020. About 2.0% of families and 3.4% of the population were below the poverty line, including 1.8% of those under age 18 and 4.5% of those age 65 or over.

In 2009, Muttontown was ranked one of the wealthiest towns in America by BusinessWeek.

== Education ==
Muttontown is served by the Jericho Union Free School District, the Locust Valley Central School District, the Oyster Bay–East Norwich Central School District, and the Syosset Central School District. Accordingly, students who attend public schools and reside in Muttontown attend school in one of these four districts, depending on where they live within the village.

== Notable people ==
- Alicia Keys – Singer/songwriter.
- Al Trautwig – Sports commentator.
- Cliff Josephy – Professional Poker Player; raised in Muttontown.
- Lester L. Wolff – Former member of the United States House of Representatives from New York.
- Chad Pennington – Football quarterback.
- Jose Reyes – Infielder for the New York Mets.

== See also ==
- List of municipalities in New York
- Matinecock, New York
