= East Norwich, New York =

- Hamlet and census-designated place
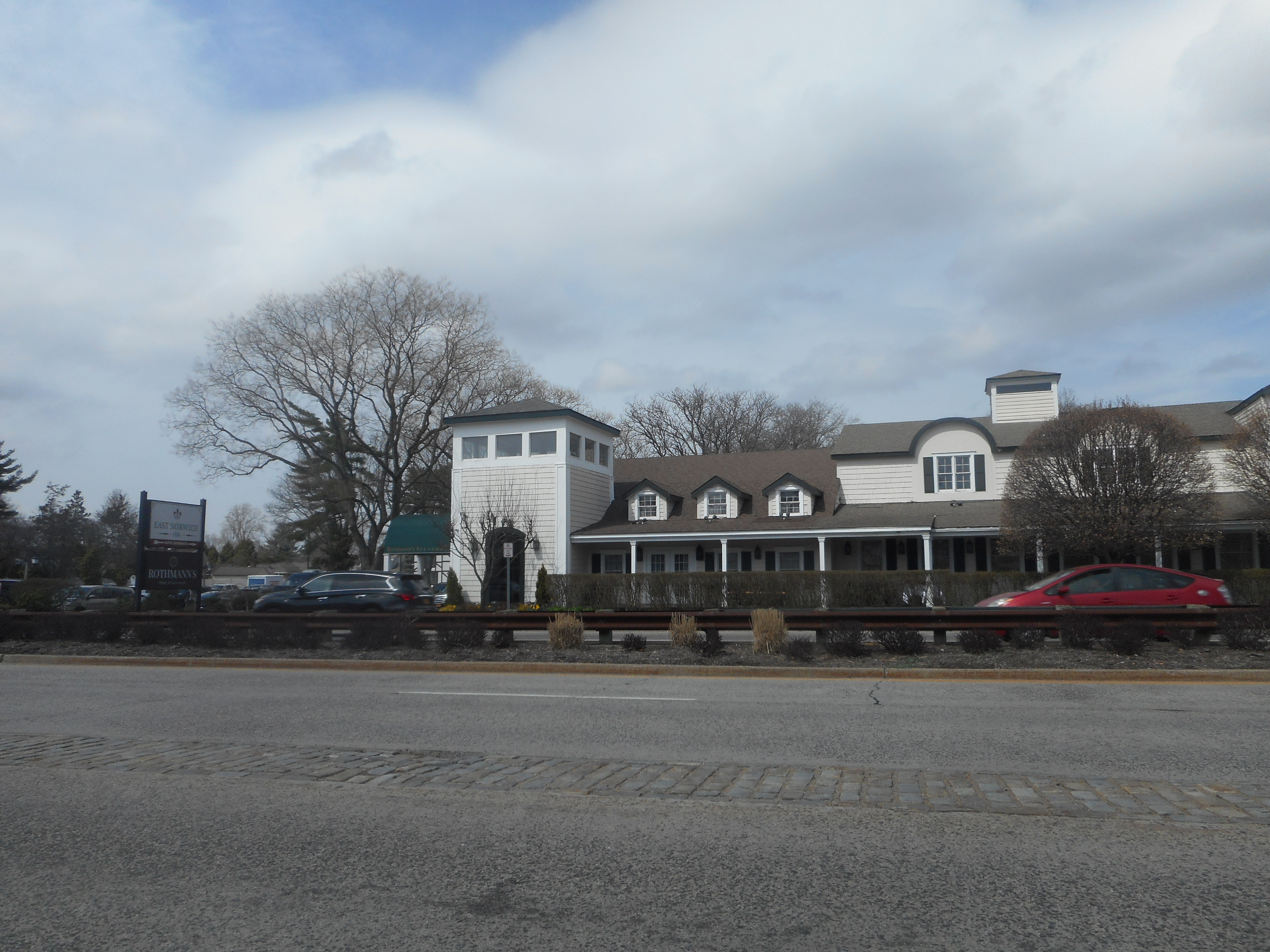
- Downtown East Norwich in 2019

- Location in Nassau County and the state of New York

- Location on Long Island Location within the state of New York
- Coordinates: 40°50′48″N 73°31′56″W
- Country: United States
- State: New York
- County: Nassau
- Town: Oyster Bay

Area
  - Total: 1.05 sq mi (2.72 km^{2})
  - Land: 1.05 sq mi (2.72 km^{2})
  - Water: 0 sq mi (0.00 km^{2})
- Elevation: 200 ft (61 m)

Population (2020)
  - Total: 2,792
  - Density: 2,653.8/sq mi (1,024.63/km^{2})
- Time zone: UTC-5 (Eastern (EST))
  - Summer (DST): UTC-4 (EDT)
- ZIP Codes: 11732 (East Norwich); 11771 (Oyster Bay)
- Area codes: 516, 363
- FIPS code): 36-22623
- GNIS feature ID: 0949190

East Norwich (formerly known as Norwich) is a hamlet and census-designated place (CDP) located within the Town of Oyster Bay in Nassau County, on the North Shore of Long Island, in New York, United States. The population was 2,792 at the time of the 2020 census.

== History ==
East Norwich was originally named Norwich, until the postal service requested the name change to eliminate confusion from the other Norwich, in Chenango County.

== Geography ==
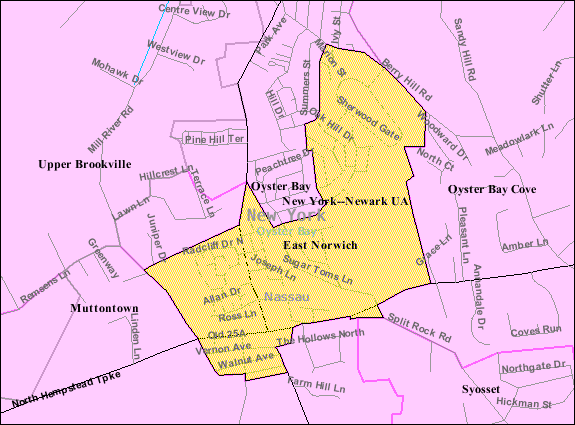
U.S. Census map of East Norwich

According to the United States Census Bureau, the CDP has a total area of 1.0 square mile (2.6 km^{2}), all land.

=== Topography ===
Like the rest of Long Island's North Shore, East Norwich is situated on a terminal moraine, which is named the Harbor Hill Moraine. This moraine was formed by glaciers during the Wisconsin Glacial Episode, and is named for Harbor Hill in Roslyn; Harbor Hill is the highest geographic point in Nassau County.

=== Climate ===
Under the Köppen climate classification, East Norwich has a Humid subtropical climate (type Cfa) with cool, wet winters and hot, humid summers. Precipitation is uniform throughout the year, with slight spring and fall peaks.

== Demographics ==
Historical population
Census	Pop.	Note	%±
2000	2,675		—
2010	2,709		1.3%
2020	2,792		3.1%
U.S. Decennial Census

=== 2020 census ===
As of the 2020 census, East Norwich had a population of 2,792. The median age was 45.5 years. 21.0% of residents were under the age of 18 and 20.2% of residents were 65 years of age or older. For every 100 females there were 96.2 males, and for every 100 females age 18 and over there were 93.6 males age 18 and over.

100.0% of residents lived in urban areas, while 0.0% lived in rural areas.

There were 968 households in East Norwich, of which 32.9% had children under the age of 18 living in them. Of all households, 67.9% were married-couple households, 9.6% were households with a male householder and no spouse or partner present, and 19.3% were households with a female householder and no spouse or partner present. About 15.9% of all households were made up of individuals and 8.7% had someone living alone who was 65 years of age or older.

There were 998 housing units, of which 3.0% were vacant. The homeowner vacancy rate was 1.5% and the rental vacancy rate was 2.9%.

Racial composition as of the 2020 census
Race	Number	Percent
White	2,421	86.7%
Black or African American	27	1.0%
American Indian and Alaska Native	0	0.0%
Asian	115	4.1%
Native Hawaiian and Other Pacific Islander	0	0.0%
Some other race	38	1.4%
Two or more races	191	6.8%
Hispanic or Latino (of any race)	222	8.0%

=== 2010 census ===
As of the 2010 census, there were 2,709 people, 966 households, and 772 families residing in the CDP. The population density was 2,554.5 inhabitants per square mile (986.3/km^{2}). There were 950 housing units at an average density of 907.2 per square mile (350.3/km^{2}). The racial makeup of the CDP was 93.50% White, 0.80% African American, 3.50% Asian, 1.10% from other races, and 1.10% from two or more races. Hispanic or Latino of any race were 4.40% of the population.

There were 943 households, out of which 35.5% had children under the age of 18 living with them, 69.4% were married couples living together, 9.8% had a female householder with no husband present, and 18.1% were non-families. 15.1% of all households were made up of individuals, and 7.8% had someone living alone who was 65 years of age or older. The average household size was 2.85 and the average family size was 3.19.

In the CDP, the population was spread out, with 26.6% under the age of 19, 4.1% from 20 to 24, 21.3% from 25 to 44, 31.9% from 45 to 64, and 16.0% who were 65 years of age or older. The median age was 43.5 years. For every 100 females, there were 91.57 males. For every 100 females age 18 and over, there were 88.0 males.

=== Income and poverty ===
The median income for a household in the CDP was $134,309, and the median income for a family was $159,890. Males had a median income of $114,934 versus $86,250 for females. The per capita income for the CDP was $62,052. About 4.0% of families and 4.0% of the population were below the poverty line, including 5.8% of those under age 18 and 1.1% of those age 65 or over.

== Education ==
=== School district ===
East Norwich, in its entirety, is served by the Oyster Bay–East Norwich Central School District. As such, all children who reside within the village and attend public schools go to Oyster Bay–East Norwich's schools.

=== Library district ===
East Norwich is located entirely within the service area of the Oyster Bay–East Norwich Library District, which is served by the Oyster Bay–East Norwich Public Library.

== Infrastructure ==
=== Transportation ===
==== Road ====
Two state routes pass through and serve East Norwich: New York State Route 25A and New York State Route 106. Other major roads located either partially or wholly within the hamlet include Highwood Road and Sugar Toms Lane.

==== Rail ====
No rail lines or train stations exist within East Norwich. The nearest Long Island Rail Road stations to the hamlet are Oyster Bay on the Oyster Bay Branch, and Syosset on the Port Jefferson Branch.

==== Bus ====
No bus routes pass through or serve East Norwich.

=== Utilities ===
==== Natural gas ====
National Grid USA provides natural gas to homes and businesses that are hooked up to natural gas lines in East Norwich.

==== Power ====
PSEG Long Island provides power to all properties and electrical infrastructure within East Norwich, on behalf of the Long Island Power Authority.

==== Water ====
East Norwich is located within the boundaries of – and is thus served by – the Jericho Water District and the Oyster Bay Water District.

==== Sewage ====
The majority of East Norwich is not connected to a sanitary sewer system, instead relying on cesspools and other septic systems. The portion of East Norwich that is connected to sanitary sewers is served located within the boundaries of – and is thus served by – the Oyster Bay Sewer District.

== Notable people ==
- Thomas Pynchon – Author.
- Consuelo Vanderbilt – Socialite; member of the Vanderbilt family.

== See also ==
- List of Census-designated places in New York
- Oyster Bay (hamlet), New York
