= List of historic mansions in the United States =

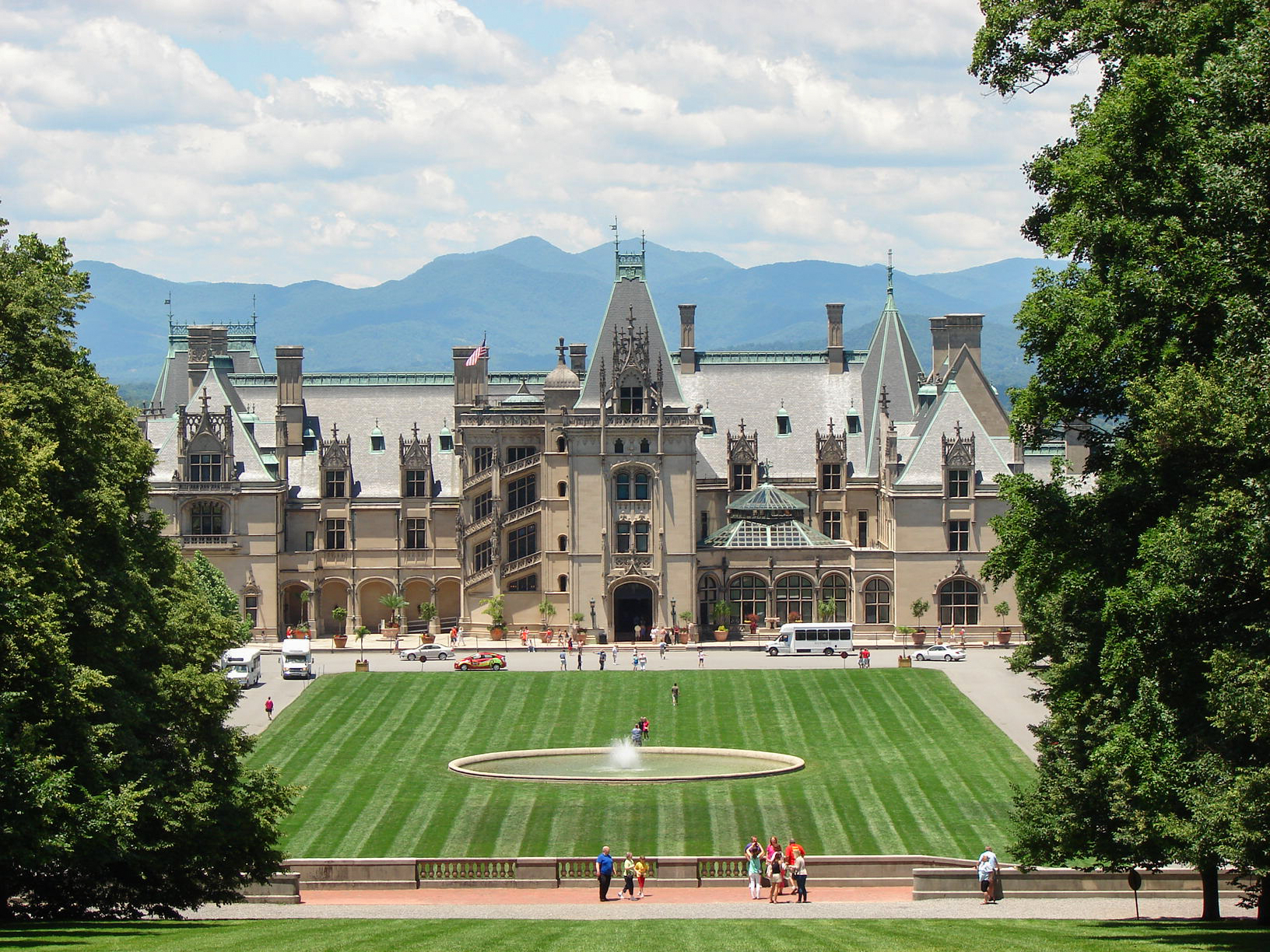
Built for a Vanderbilt family heir, Biltmore is the largest home in the United States

Lavish mansions were built by some of the richest people in the United States before, during, and following the Gilded Age up until the outbreak of World War II.

These estates were raised by the nation's industrial, financial and commercial elite, who amassed great fortunes in era of expansion of the tobacco, railroad, steel, and oil industries coinciding with a lack of both governmental regulation and the absence of a personal income tax. The manor homes and city seats were designed by prominent architects of the day and decorated with antiquities, furniture, and works of art from the world over.

Many of the wealthy had undertaken grand tours of Europe, during which they admired the estates of the nobility. Seeing themselves as their American equivalent, they wished to emulate the old world dwellings on American soil, and spent extravagantly to do so, often seeking to one-up each other. Concentrations of such homes developed in the financial centers and resorts of the Northeast, the industrial heartland of the Upper Midwest, and in the rapidly expanding regions of the West Coast, with vacation homes also appearing prominently in Florida.

== Alabama ==
| Image | Name | Year built | Style | Architect | City | Notes | Ref. |
|---|---|---|---|---|---|---|---|
| | Tyson-Maner House | 1890 | Late Victorian & Italian Villa | | Montgomery | Constructed for Real Estate developer Archibald Pitt Tyson and presently a law office. | |
| | Bell House | 1893 | Queene Anne | Frank Lockwood | Prattville | Built for Joseph Bennett Bell and later the setting of The Grass Harp. | |
| | Tacon Barfield House | 1901 | Queen Anne | George Franklin Barber | Mobile | Today a private residence | |
| | Governor's Mansion | 1908 | Neoclassical Revival | Weatherly Carter | Montgomery | Originally built for Robert Fulwood Ligon Jr. and later converted into Governor's Mansion. | |
| | Avant House | 1914 | Classical Revival | Lockwood, Frank; Merrill, E.R. | Andalusia | Built by Frank Lockwood and later owned by William W. Avant | |
| | Bishop Manor | 1925 | Mediterranean Revival | Steven Bishop | St. Elmo | 7 Acre estate including historic mansion. | |

== Alaska ==
| Image | Name | Year built | Style | Architect | City | Notes | Ref. |
|---|---|---|---|---|---|---|---|
| | J.M. Davis House | 1892 | English | | Juneau | Built for J.M. Davis and considered one of the only "mansions" in the area at the time. | |
| | Burkhart-Dibrell House | 1904 | Queene Anne | | Ketchikan | Built for H.Z. Burkhart and later owned by Captain Walter Dibrell. | |
| | See House | 1905 | Gothic Revival | Bishop Peter Trimble Rowe; H.L. Duhring, Jr. | Sitka | This house serves as the rectory for the St. Paul's Church | |
| | Governor's Mansion | 1912 | Colonial Revival | James Knox Taylor | Juneau | Replaced an earlier mansion on-site and occupied by Alaska Governors since. | |
| | Mills House | 1911-1913 | Colonial Revival | Clyde A. MacLaren | Sitka | Built for May Mills, sister of W.P. Mills. Presently a multi-use building after conversion out of residential use. | |

== Arizona ==
| Image | Name | Year built | Style | Architect | City | Notes | Ref. |
|---|---|---|---|---|---|---|---|
| | Niels Peterson House | 1892 | Queene Anne | James M. Creighton | Tempe | Built for Niels Peterson and later owned by Edward Decker, who made alterations. Presently a house museum. | |
| | Rosson House | 1895 | Queen Anne | George Franklin Barber | Phoenix | Today a historic house museum in Heritage Square | |
| | Loma Linda Lodge | 1908 | Crafts / Mission Revival Style | Trost & Trost | Bisbee | Built for Walter Douglas in formerly Warren, Arizona. Went from a residence to apartments to a lodge and back into a private residence. | |
| | Ellis-Shackelford House | 1917 | Bungalow | R.A. Gray | Phoenix | Built for William Ellis and later owned by J. Gordon Shackelford before being turned into a house museum. | |
| | La Colina Solana | 1929-1931 | Mission / Spanish Revival | Earl T. Heitschmidt | Phoenix | Built for William Wrigley Jr. combining many styles. Presently a social club. | |

== Arkansas ==
| Image | Name | Year built | Style | Architect | City | Notes | Ref. |
|---|---|---|---|---|---|---|---|
| | Hornibrook House | 1888 | Queen Anne | | Little Rock | Part of Governor's Mansion Historic District | |
| | The Reserve | 1890 | Classical Revival | Witt, Seibert & Halsey | Hot Springs | Heavily altered to present appearance in 1919 for owner W.C. Brown. Now an Inn. | |
| | Patrick J. Ahern House | 1906 | Classical Revival | Burdsal Company | Texarkana | Built for Patrick J. Ahern with many materials from Italy. | |
| | Ellis Hall | 1913 | Bungalow/Craftsman | Charles L. Thompson | Conway | Built on Hendrix College campus as a Presidents Hall | |
| | Van Lyell House | 1931 | Mission/Spanish Revival | Granger McDaniel | Hot Springs | Centerpiece of the Hamilton House estate, built for Van Lyell. | |

== California ==
| Image | Name | Year built | Style | Architect | City | Notes | Ref. |
|---|---|---|---|---|---|---|---|
| | David and Sarah Morey House | 1890 | Queen Anne | | Redlands | | |
| | Thomas Douglas Stimson House | 1891 | Richardsonian Romanesque, Gothic Revival | Carroll H. Brown, E.D. Elliot | Los Angeles | Today, part of the Sisters of St. Joseph of Carondelet convent complex | |
| | Lewis Leonard Bradbury House | 1887 | Queen Anne | Samuel Newsom and Joseph Cather Newsom | Los Angeles | Demolished in 1929 | |
| | Margaret E. Crocker Mansion | 1886 | Queen Anne | John Hall | Los Angeles | Demolished in 1908 | |
| | Rose Mansion | 1888 | Queen Anne | Curlett & Eissen | Los Angeles | Demolished in 1937 | |
| | Governor's Mansion-Gallatin house | 1877 | Second Empire | Nathaniel D. Goodell | Sacramento | Is the official residence of the governor of California since 1903 | |
| | Leland Stanford Mansion | 1857 | Second Empire | Seth Babson | Sacramento | Owned by the government of California | |
| more images | Ralston Hall | 1864 | Victorian-Italianate Villa | Henry Cleaveland | Belmont | Located on the campus of Notre Dame de Namur University | |
| more images | McDonald Mansion (also known as Mableton) | 1877 | Stick/Eastlake | | Santa Rosa | The exterior was used in the filming of Walt Disney's Pollyanna | |
| | Linden Towers | 1878 | Gothic, Italianate and Second Empire | Laver & Curlett | San Francisco | Was built for James C Flood, was demolished in 1936. | |
| more images | Mark Hopkins Mansion | 1878 | Gothic | Wright & Sanders | San Francisco | Destroyed by fire following the 1906 San Francisco earthquake | |
| | David B Colton Mansion | 1872 | Neo-classical | S. C. Bugbee & Son | San Francisco | Later bought by Collis Potter Huntington. Was destroyed in the 1906 San Francisco earthquake | |
| | Leland Stanford Mansion | 1876 | Italianate | S. C. Bugbee & Son | San Francisco | Was destroyed in the 1906 San Francisco earthquake | |
| more images | Charles Crocker Mansion | 1877 | Second Empire and Neo-classical | S. C. Bugbee & Son and Curlett & Cuthbertson | San Francisco | Destroyed during the 1906 San Francisco earthquake | |
| | William Henry Crocker Mansion | 1888 | Queen Anne | S. C. Bugbee & Son | San Francisco | Destroyed during the 1906 San Francisco earthquake | |
| more images | James C. Flood Mansion | 1886 | Neo-classical | Augustus Laver; Willis Polk | San Francisco | Today, home of the Pacific-Union Club | |
| | Haas-Lilienthal House | 1886 | Queen Anne | Peter Schmidt | San Francisco | Built for William Haas, today is a house museum | |
| | Ashe/Crocker Mansion | 1883 | Queen Anne | Curlett & Cuthbertson | San Francisco | Built for Aimee Crocker (Charles Crocker's niece) and Richard Potter Ashe, it was badly damaged in the 1906 San Francisco earthquake and destroyed by fire in 1913 | |
| more images | Sarah Winchester House | 1884 | Queen Anne | Sarah Winchester | San Jose | Winchester did not use an architect and added on to the building in a haphazard fashion. Much of the house was lost in the 1906 San Francisco earthquake. | |
| more images | Carson Mansion | 1886 | Queen Anne | Samuel Newsom and Joseph Cather Newsom | Eureka | Built for William Carson, today is "Considered the most grand Victorian home in America." | |
| | Gamble House | 1908 | Bungalow in American Craftsman style of Arts and Crafts Movement | Greene & Greene | Pasadena | It was Doc's house in Back to the Future | |
| more images | Huntington Residence | 1909 | Mediterranean Revival | Myron Hunt | San Marino | Former residence of Henry E. Huntington, now an art gallery. | |
| more images | Hearst Castle | Between 1919 and 1947 | Spanish Colonial Revival, Mediterranean Revival | Julia Morgan | San Simeon | Built by William Randolph Hearst | |
| more images | Filoli | 1915 | Georgian Revival | Willis Polk | Woodside | Owned by the National Trust for Historic Preservation and open to the public | |
| more images | Carolands | 1916 | Beaux-Arts Classicism | Ernest Sanson | Hillsborough | Owned by the Carolands Foundation and open to the public | |

== Colorado ==
| Image | Name | Year built | Style | Architect | City | Notes | Ref. |
|---|---|---|---|---|---|---|---|
| | Richthofen Castle | 1887 | Gothic Revival, Tudor Revival | Alexander Cazin; Biscoe & Hewitt (1910 renovation); Jacques Benedict (1924 renovation) | Montclair, Denver | Built for Baron Walter von Richthofen | |
| | The Molkery | 1888 | Germanic Castle | Alexander Cazin | Montclair, Denver | Built for Baron Walter von Richthofen, now the Montclair Civic Center | |
| | Molly Brown House | 1889 | Richardsonian Romanesque, Queen Anne Revival | William A. Lang | Denver | Originally built for Isaac Large, purchased by J.J. Brown, later owned by Molly Brown | |
| | Ferguson-Gano House | 1897 | | Theodore Davies Boal | Denver | Built for inventor, and socialite John Albert Ferguson, purchased by businessman George Gano | |
| | Grant–Humphreys Mansion | 1902 | Neoclassical | Theodore Davies Boal | Denver | Built for James Benton Grant, later owned by A.E. Humphreys | |
| | Redstone Castle | 1903 | Stick style | Theodore Davies Boal | Redstone | Built for John Cleveland Oswood, today is a hotel and museum. | |
| | Crawford Hill Mansion | 1906 | French Renaissance Revival | Theodore Davies Boal | Denver | Built for Crawford Hill | |
| | Claremont | 1907 | Beaux Arts | Thomas MacLaren | Colorado Springs | Presently the Colorado Springs School. | |

== Connecticut ==
| Image | Name | Year built | Style | Architect | City | Notes | Ref. |
|---|---|---|---|---|---|---|---|
| | Iranistan | 1848 | Moorish | Leopold Eldlitz | Bridgeport | Was the first mansion of P.T Barnum, was destroyed by fire in 1857. | |
| | Lindencroft | 1860 | Italianante | Albert G Tallmadge | Bridgeport | Was the second mansion of P.T Barnum after the fire in Iranistan, was demolished in 1924. | |
| | Lockwood–Mathews Mansion | 1864 | Renaissance | Detlef Lienau | Norwalk | Today, a museum | |
| | Waldemere | 1869 | Stick Victorian | | Bridgeport | Was the third mansion of P.T Barnum, was demolished in 1889 for his new mansion, Marina. | |
| | Samuel Clemens House (Mark Twain) | 1874 | Victorian Gothic | Edward Tuckerman Potter | Hartford | Today, a museum | |
| | Marina | 1889 | Romanesque and Queen Anne | Longstaff and Hurd | Bridgeport | Was the fourth and last mansion of P.T Barnum in Bridgeport, was demolished in 1961. | |
| | Hilltop | 1889 | | | Greenwich | Built for Henry Osborne Havemeyer, was demolished in 1930. | |
| more images | Copper Beech Farm aka Lauder Greenway Estate | 1896 or 1898 | French Renaissance | | Greenwich | Originally built by NYC native John Hamilton Gourlie, it was purchased by Andrew Carnegie's niece Harriet Lauder Greenway in 1905. Fully restored and renovated in 2023. For a time, it was the most expensive home in United States history. || | |
| | Indian Harbor | 1895 | Neoclassical | Carrere & Hastings | Greenwich | Built for Elias Cornelius Benedict. One floor removed, circa 1938. | |
| | Mailands | 1906 | French Renaissance and Colonial Revivial | Flagg & Chambers | Fairfield | Built for Oliver Gould Jennings, there is known as McAuliffe Hall and still standing | |
| | Conyers Farms | 1905 | English Revival | Donn Barber | Greenwich | Built for Edmund C Converse, was destroyed by fire in 1985. | |
| | Owenoke Farm | 1908 | Neoclassical | | Greenwich | Built for Percy Avery Rockefeller, was demolished in 1935. | |
| | Greyledge | 1913 | | | Greenwich | Built for Raynal Cawthorne Bolling, was demolished in 2006. | |
| | Marion Castle | 1914-1916 | French Chateau | Hunt & Hunt | Stamford | Built for Frank J. Marion. Today, a private residence. | |

== Delaware ==
| Image | Name | Year built | Style | Architect | City | Notes | Ref. |
|---|---|---|---|---|---|---|---|
| | Lesley-Travers Mansion | 1855 | Gothic Revival | Thomas and James Dixon | New Castle | Large house also known as the Deemer House, Travers Mansion, and the Lesley House | |
| | Draper House | 1870 | Classical Revival, Gothic, Queene Anne | | Milford | Originally a Victorian Gothic home renovated in the early 20th century. Once used as housing for Milford Hospital. | |
| | Green Mansion | 1882 | Late Victorian | | Newark | Originally a home later converted into commercial use and recently demolished with the front facade preserved. | |
| | Curtis Mansion | 1903 | Romanesque | | Newark | Built for Alfred A. Curtis and since acquired and used by the University of Delaware | |
| more images | Nemours | 1909 | French Neoclassical | Carrère and Hastings | Wilmington | Owned by the Nemours Foundation | |

== District of Columbia ==
| Image | Name | Year built | Style | Architect | City | Notes | Ref. |
|---|---|---|---|---|---|---|---|
| more images | Christian Heurich Mansion | 1892 | Richardson Romanesque | John Granville Meyers | Washington, DC | Formerly housed the Historical Society of Washington | |
| more images | Townsend House | 1898–1901 | Beaux Arts | Carrère and Hastings | Washington, DC | Built for Mary Scott Townsend and her husband Richard Townsend; home of the Cosmos Club since 1952 | |
| more images | Walsh-McLean House | 1903 | | | Washington, DC | Today the Embassy of Indonesia | |
| more images | Anderson House | 1905 | Beaux-Arts | Little & Browne | Washington, DC | Built for Lartz Anderson. Today, it houses the Society of the Cincinnati's headquarters | |
| more images | Perry Belmont House | 1909 | Beaux-Arts | Ernest-Paul Sanson | Washington, DC | Headquarters of the General Grand Chapter of the Order of the Eastern Star | |
| more images | Edward Hamlin Everett House | 1915 | Beaux-Arts | George Oakley Totten Jr. | Washington, DC | Formerly the Turkish embassy, today the ambassador's residence | |
| | Patterson Mansion | 1903 | Neoclassical | Stanford White | Washington, DC | Built for Robert Wilson Patterson. | |
| | Leiter Mansion | 1893 | Colonial Revival and Neoclassical | Theophilus Parsons Chandler Jr | Washington, DC | Built for Levi Leiter. Was demolished in 1947. | |
| | Blaine Mansion | 1882 | Second Empire | John Fraser | Washington, DC | Built for James G Blaine. | |
| | Stewart's Castle | 1873 | Second Empire | Adolph Clauss | Washington, DC | Built for William Morris Stewart, was demolished in 1901. | |
| | Galt Mansion | 1876 | Chateusque | | Washington, DC | Originally built for William Mathew Galt, later sold to Alexander Graham Bell and Edson Bradley. Bardley enlarged the house in 1907. Was demolished in 1930s. | |
| | Field-Hearst Mansion | 1883 | Romanesque | Robert I Fleming | Washington, DC | Built for John W Field, later was sold to Charles S Fairchild and George Hearst, father of William Randolph Hearst. Was demolished in 1964. | |

== Florida ==
| Image | Name | Year built | Style | Architect | City | Notes | Ref. |
|---|---|---|---|---|---|---|---|
| | Villa Zorayda | 1883 | Moorish Revival | Franklin W Smith | St. Augustine | Designed by Franklin W Smith for himself, today is a museum. | |
| more images | Whitehall | 1902 | Beaux Arts | Pottier & Stymus, Carrère and Hastings | Palm Beach | Built for the co-founder of Standard Oil, Henry Morrison Flagler. Today is open to the public for tours | |
| more images | The Casements | 1910 | Shingle Style | | Ormond Beach | Built for the Reverend Dr. Harwood Huntington, later bought by John D Rockefeller in 1918, who died in the house in 1937. Was owned by the city of Ormond Beach and used as a cultural center and park | |
| more images | Villa Vizcaya | 1914 | Mediterranean Revival and Baroque | F. Burrall Hoffman; Paul Chalfin (designer); Diego Suarez (landscape) | Miami | Houses the Miami Dade Art Museum | |
| | El Mirasol | 1920 | Mediterranean Revival | Addison Cairns Mizner | Palm Beach | Built for Edward Townsend Stotesbury. Was demolished in 1958 | |

== Georgia ==
| Image | Name | Year built | Style | Architect | City | Notes | Ref. |
|---|---|---|---|---|---|---|---|
| | Rockefeller Cottage | 1892 | Shingle | | Jekyll Island | Was the summer house of William Rockefeller Jr. Today, a museum operated by Jekyll Island Museum | |
| | The Greyfield | 1905 | Colonial Revival | | Cumberland Island | Was built for Margaret Carnegie Ricketson. Today, an inn and wedding venue | |
| | Dungeness | 1886 | Queen Anne | | Cumberland Island | Built for Thomas M Carnegie. Destroyed by fire in 1959 | |
| | Plum Orchard | 1898 | Classical Revival | Peabody and Stearns | Cumberland Island | Built for George Lauder Carnegie. The estate is now part of Cumberland Island National Seashore. | |
| | Rhodes Hall | 1904 | Richardson Romanesque | Willis F Denny | Atlanta | Built for Amos Giles Rhodes, today is open to the public and has been the home of The Georgia Trust for Historic Preservation since 1983. | |
| | John H James Residence | 1869 | Second Empire | William H Parkins | Atlanta | Originally built for John H James, was the Georgia Governor's Mansion between 1870 and 1923, in that year was demolished. | |
| | Callanwolde | 1917–1921 | Late Gothic Revival | Henry Hornbostel | Atlanta | Built for Charles Howard Candler and his family. Today, it is the Callanwolde Fine Arts Center, a nonprofit community arts center. | |
| | Swan House | 1928 | Renaissance Revival | Philip T. Shutze | Atlanta | Built for Edward and Emily Inman. Today, it is part of the Atlanta History Center. | |
| | Briarcliff | 1922 | Colonial Revival, Georgian Revival | Charles E. Frazier | Atlanta | Built for Asa Griggs Candler Jr., son of Asa Griggs Candler and heir to the Coca-Cola fortune. Now part of the Briarcliff Campus of Emory University. | |

== Hawaii ==
| Image | Name | Year built | Style | Architect | City | Notes | Ref. |
|---|---|---|---|---|---|---|---|
| | Washington Place | 1847 | Greek Revival | Isaac Hart | Honolulu | Built for John Dominis and later used by the Kingdom of Hawaii. Then it became Governor's Mansion and is now a museum. | |
| | ʻIolani Palace | 1879 | American Florentine | Thomas J. Baker, Charles J. Wall, Isaac Moore | Honolulu | Formerly the royal residence of the Kingdom of Hawaii. Then became the capitol building before being converted into a museum. | |
| | Kualii | 1912 | Tudor Revival | Emory & Webb | Honolulu | Built for Monty Cooke and is opened for tours. | |
| | Canavarro Castle | 1927 | Mediterranean Revival | Hart Wood | Honolulu | Built for Georges De S. Canvarro and presently a meeting site and museum of the Korean Independence Movement. | |
| | Shangri La | 1936-1938 | Islamic | Marion Sims Wyeth | Oahu | Built for Doris Duke and filled with her artifacts for decades. Presently, it has become a museum honoring Duke's love for Islamic culture. | |

== Illinois ==
| Image | Name | Year built | Style | Architect | City | Notes | Ref. |
|---|---|---|---|---|---|---|---|
| | Marshall Field House | 1873 | Second Empire | Richard Morris Hunt | Chicago | Demolished in 1955 | |
| | George Pullman House | 1876 | Second Empire | Henry S. Jaffray | Chicago | Demolished in 1922 | |
| | IL. Hegeler Carus Mansion | 1876 | Second Empire | William W. Boyington, | LaSalle | The mansion hosts numerous public programs, and is open for public tours. It is particularly notable for its high Victorian stencils and wall and ceiling paintings, its woodwork, and its history. | |
| | Cyrus McCormick Mansion | 1879 | Second Empire | | Chicago | Demolished in 1954. | |
| | Thomas Dent House | 1881 | Romanesque | Burnham & Root | Chicago | Demolished in 1950s | |
| | Joseph Sears House | 1882 | Romanesque | Burnham & Root | Chicago | Demolished in 1967 | |
| | John W Doane Mansion | 1882 | Romanesque | Theodore V. Wadskier | Chicago | Demolished in 1929. | |
| | Marshall Field Jr House | 1884 | Romanesque | Solon Spencer Beman | Chicago | Today, converted into condominiums | |
| | John J. Glessner House | 1887 | Romanesque, Richardsonian | Henry Hobson Richardson | Chicago | Today, Glessner House Museum | |
| | John Cudahy Mansion | 1888 | Romanesque | | Chicago | Demolished in 1961. | |
| | Edith Rockefeller McCormick Mansion | 1883 | Romanesque | Solon Spencer Beman | Chicago | Originally built for Nathaniel Jones, Demolished in 1955 for an apartment building. | |
| | Ferdinand Peck Mansion | 1889 | Romanesque | William LeBaron Jenney | Chicago | Demolished in 1969. | |
| | William Wallace Kimball House | 1892 | Châteauesque | Solon Spencer Beman | Chicago | Former home of the United States Soccer Federation | |
| more images | Nickerson House | 1883 | Late Victorian | Burling & Whitehouse | Chicago | Home to the Richard H. Driehaus Museum | |
| | Borden Mansion | 1886 | Châteauesque | Richard Morris Hunt | Chicago | Built for William Borden, was demolished in 1962 | |
| | MacVeigh Mansion | 1893 | Richardson Romanesque | Henry Hobson Richardson | Chicago | Built for Franklin MacVeigh, it was one of only two structures designed by HH Rochardson in Chicago. Was demolished in 1922. | |
| | McGill Mansion | 1891 | Châteauesque | Henry Ives Cobbs | Chicago | Built for Dr John Alexander McGill, today are 34 condominiuns. | |
| | Farwell Mansion | 1882 | Châteauesque | Treat & Foltz | Chicago | Built for Charles B Farwell, was demolished in 1946 | |
| more images | Palmer Mansion | 1885 | Early Romanesque, Norman Gothic | Henry Ives Cobb and Charles Sumner Frost | Chicago | Demolished in 1950 | |

== Indiana ==
| Image | Name | Year built | Style | Architect | City | Notes | Ref. |
|---|---|---|---|---|---|---|---|
| | Schenck Mansion | 1874 | Second Empire, Italianate | George P. Humphries | Vevay | Built for Benjamin Schenck and renovated in 2000. Presently a Bed & Breakfast | |
| | Bates-McGowan Mansion | 1876 | Romanesque Revival | William Lebaron Jenney | Indianapolis | Built for Harvey Bates Jr, was demolished in 1936 | |
| | Seiberling Mansion | 1887 | Queene Anne and Romanesque Revival | Arthur Labelle; Ike V. Smith | Kokomo | Built for Monroe Seiberling at a price of $50,000. Presently the Howard County Museum | |
| | Tippecanoe Place | 1889 | Richardsonian Romanesque | Henry Ives Cobb | South Bend | Built for Clement Studebaker, currently a restaurant | |
| | Riverdale | 1911-1914 | Bungalow/Craftsman | H. Bass | Indianapolis | Built for James A. Allison | |

== Iowa ==
| Image | Name | Year built | Style | Architect | City | Notes | Ref. |
|---|---|---|---|---|---|---|---|
| | J. Monroe Parker–Ficke House | 1881 | Second Empire | T. W. McClelland | Davenport | Since 1978 the building has served as a fraternity house for Delta Sigma Chi from the Palmer College of Chiropractic. | |
| | J.C Hubinger Mansion | 1887 | Queen Anne | C.H Stilson | Keokuk | Was demolished in 1918 | |
| | Fred B. Sharon House | 1891 | Second Empire | | Davenport | Today a private residence | |
| | John Peirce Mansion | 1893 | Romanesque Revival | Hansen Bros. | Sioux City | It is open to the public for quarterly open house events and is available for rental. | |
| | C.R Joy House | 1896 | Queen Anne | George Franklin Barber | Keokuk | Destroyed by fire in 2018 | |

== Kentucky ==
| Image | Name | Year built | Style | Architect | City | Notes | Ref. |
|---|---|---|---|---|---|---|---|
| | Ashland | 1854-1857 | Italianate | Thomas Lewinski | Lexington | Originally an 1811 plantation home was built for sportsman Henry Clay. In 1854-1857 it was rebuilt for James Clay and later owned by Kentucky University. Anne Clay McDowell purchased it from them and it has since become a museum. | |
| | Conrad-Caldwell House | 1895 | Richardson Romanesque | Arthur Loomis | Louisville | Built for Theophilus Conrad, today is a house museum | |
| | Juniper Hill | 1900 | Colonial Revival | Dodd, William J.; Cobb, Arthur, et al | Frankfort | Constructed for George F. Berry on historic land formerly known as Monroe Hill. Purchased by the state in 1957 and used as a state library until 1982. Most of the property is now Juniper Hill Park. | |
| | Mayo Mansion | 1905-1912 | Classical Revival | Herman Geisky | Paintsville | Constructed for John C.C. Mayo and required over one hundred Italian Stonemasons. Later owned by Sandy Valley Seminary, E.J. Evans, Reverend William T. Mulcoy, and presently operates as the Our Lady of Mountains School. | |
| | Boxhill | 1906-1910 | Georgian Revival | Joseph E. Chandler | Glenview | Constructed for William E. Chess. Altered in 1956 and later donated to Bellarmine University. | |

== Maine ==
| Image | Name | Year built | Style | Architect | City | Notes | Ref. |
|---|---|---|---|---|---|---|---|
| | Morse-Libby House | 1860 | Italianate | Henry Austin | Portland | Today, a museum | |
| | Reverie Cove | 1895 | Colonial Revival | Frederick Lincoln Savage | Bar Harbor | Built for Dr. John Davies Jones, later owned by Abram Hewitt, today, a private residence | |
| | East of Eden | 1910 | Mediterranean Revival | Guy Lowell | Bar Harbor | Today, a private residence | |
| | Highseas | 1912 | Colonial Revival | Frederick Lincoln Savage | Bar Harbor | Today, owned by Jackson Laboratories | |
| | Oak Hall | 1914 | Colonial Revival | Benjamin Marshall | Northport | Today, a private residence | |

== Maryland ==
| Image | Name | Year built | Style | Architect | City | Notes | Ref. |
|---|---|---|---|---|---|---|---|
| | Glenview | 1838 | Classical Revival | Porter, Irwin S.; Lockie, Joseph A. | Rockville | Colonial farm heavily expanded to a country estate by James Alexander Lyon in 1923. This version was completed in 1926 and has been a park since 1956. | |
| | Evergreen Museum & Library | 1858 | Classical Revival | Multiple | Baltimore | Now a historic house museum | |
| | Shaw Mansion | 1872 | Italianate | Andrew Shaw | Barton | Large private residence still standing in Maryland. | |
| | Hartefeld Hall | 1925 | Georgian | | Centreville | Constructed or John. J. Raskob and acquired in the 1970s by the Soviet Government. Vacated in 2016. | |
| | Wye Hall | 1936 | Georgian Revival | Tilden, Register and Pepper | Queenstown | Built for William Stillwell on the site of a former plantation house. | |

== Massachusetts ==
| Image | Name | Year built | Style | Architect | City | Notes | Ref. |
|---|---|---|---|---|---|---|---|
| | Stephen Van Rensselaer Thayer House | 1872 | Second Empire | Peabody & Stearns | Boston | Today, offices | |
| | Bull Mansion | 1876 | Romanesque Revival | Calvert Vaux | Worcester | Built for George Bull, later was the Grand Army of Republic Hall, today a restaurant. | |
| | Eustis Estate | 1878 | Late Victorian | William Ralph Emerson | Milton | Constructed as a wedding gift for W.E.C Eustis and his wife. Owned by the same family until 2012 when it was sold to Historic New England. It opened as a house museum in 2017. | |
| | Kragsyde Mansion, George Nixon Black Jr. House | 1885 | Shingle | Peabody & Stearns | Manchester by the sea | Demolished in 1927 | |
| more images | Elm Court | 1885 | Shingle style | Peabody & Stearns | Lenox | Built for Emily Thorn Vanderbilt and later run as an inn by surviving relatives. Most recently purchased in 2022 and plans exist to renovate the mansion. | |
| more images | Naumkeag | 1887 | Shingle style | Stanford White | Stockbridge | Maintained by the Trustees of Reservations | |
| | Oronoque | 1887 | Shingle style | William Henry Miller | Stockbridge | Later called Indian Hill; current condominiums | |
| more images | Searles Castle | 1888 | Renaissance Revival Châteauesque | McKim, Mead & White | Great Barrington | Home to the John Dewey Academy | |
| | Borden House | 1892 | | | Fall River | Built for Andrew Borden, a wealthy casket magnate, and later real estate developer, him, and his wife were murdered by Lizzie Borden in the house in 1892 | |
| more images | Wheatleigh | 1893 | Renaissance Revival | Peabody & Stearns | Lenox | Operated as a hotel | |
| more images | Ventfort Hall | 1893 | Jacobean Revival | Rotch & Tilden | Lenox | Built for Sarah Spencer Morgan and later used as school dorms, a hotel, a ballet camp, and finally a religious venue. Became abandoned and was saved in the late 1990s. Now operates as a house and Gilded Age museum | |
| more images | Shadow Brook Farm | 1893 | Tudor Revival | H. Neill Wilson | Stockbridge | Burned down in 1956 | |
| | Albert Cameron Burrage House | 1899 | Châteauesque | Charles Brigham | Boston | Today, Apartments | |
| | Bellefontaine | 1899 | | Carrère and Hastings | Lenox | Built for Giraud Foster, now a hotel | |
| more images | The Mount | 1902 | Georgian Revival | Ogden Codman Jr. and Francis L.V. Hoppin; Beatrix Farrand (landscape) | Lenox | Home of Edith Wharton; later school dormitories and owned by The Shakespeare theatre company. Now open to the public. | |
| more images | Isabella Stewart Gardner House | 1902 | Renaissance Revival | Willard T. Sears | Boston | Houses the Isabella Stewart Gardner Museum | |
| | Northfield Chateau | 1903 | Châteauesque | Bruce Price | Northfield | Built for Francis Robert Schell. Was demolished in 1963. | |
| | Eagle Rock | 1904 | Colonial Revival | Little & Browne | Prides Crossing | Built for Henry Clay Frick. Was demolished in 1969. | |
| | Southfields | 1905-1907 | Georgian | Winslow, Bigelow & Wadsworth | Williamstown | Built for Robert Cluett, of the Cluett's who owned Arrow Shirts. Later owned by Pine Cobble School from 1940-1941. Renovated in 2017 and remains a private residence. | |
| | Cheney–Baltzell Mansion | 1907 | Italianate, with Medieval Spanish details and landscape | Carrère and Hastings | Dover | Built for Alice Cheney–Baltzell, now, open for tours | |
| more images | Bellefontaine Mansion | 1912 | Beaux-Arts | Carrère and Hastings | Lenox | Built for Giraud Foster. Today, the Lenox location of Canyon Ranch | |
| | Elm Tree House | 1924-1929 | Georgian | James Gamble Rodger | Williamstown | Built for Alta Rockefeller Prentice on an estate she founded in 1910. Presently owned by Williams College. | |

== Michigan ==
| Image | Name | Year built | Style | Architect | City | Notes | Ref. |
|---|---|---|---|---|---|---|---|
| | Wilhelm Böing House | 1875 | Châteauesque | Henry T Brush | Detroit | Wilhelmm Böing was the father of William E Boeing, founder of the famous aviation company. The house was demolished in 1935. | |
| | Joseph Black House | 1876 | English Revival | Mortimer L Smith | Detroit | Demolished in 1920. | |
| | Philo Parsons House | 1876 | Second Empire | Elijah Myers | Detroit | Demolished in 1935 | |
| | Clark J Whitney House | 1865 | Italianate | | Detroit | Demolished in 1914 | |
| | Charles DuCharme House | 1869 | Second Empire | Mortimer L Smith | Detroit | Demolished in 1949 | |
| | Henry P. Baldwin House | 1877 | Italianate | Gordon W Lloyd | Detroit | Demolished in 1930s | |
| | Thomas W. Palmer Mansion | 1864 | Italianate | Henry T Brush | Detroit | Originally built in 1864 and greatly enlarged in 1874, was destroyed by fire in 1908. | |
| | William H. Wells House | 1889 | Richardsonian Romanesque | William H. Miller | Detroit | Today it is still a private home | |
| | A.L Stephens Mansion | 1890 | Romanesque | Mason & Rice | Detroit | Was built for Albert L Stephens and demolished in 1925. | |
| | George S Frost House | 1881 | Queen Anne | | Detroit | Was built for George Smith Frost in the Brush Park neighborhood, was demolished in 1998 after 30 years of abandonment. | |
| | Leggett Mansion | 1883 | Romanesque | John Scott & Co | Detroit | Was built for Wells Wilner Leggett, was demolished in 1930s. | |
| | Meadow Brook Hall, Matilda Dodge House | 1929 | Tudor Revival | William E. Kapp Smith, Hinchman & Grylls | Rochester Hills | Today it is the Meadow Brook Hall Museum | |
| | Ransom Gillis House | 1876 | Venetian Gothic | Henry T. Brush & George D. Mason | Detroit | Abandoned since 1970 until its restoration in 2015 | |
| | Franklin H. Walker House | 1896 | Neo-Jacobean | Mason & Rice | Detroit | Transformed into Michigan Mutual Liability Hospital and demolished in 1990 | |
| | Charles Lang Freer House | 1892 | Shingle | Wilson Eyre | Detroit | Today, a Wayne State University campus building | |
| | George Jerome House | 1877 | Second Empire | Henry T Brush | Detroit | Demolished in 1935 | |
| | Col. Frank J. Hecker House | 1892 | French Renaissance | Louis Kamper Scott, Kamper and Scott | Detroit | Today, a Wayne State University campus building | |
| more images | David Whitney House | 1894 | Romanesque Revival | Gordon W. Lloyd | Detroit | Today, a restaurant | |
| | Burt/Stephens Mansion | 1881/1891 | Châteauesque | Mason & Rice | Detroit | Was built in 1881 for John Burt, was sold to Clorinda L Stephens in 1891 and extensively altered. Finally was demolished in 1920s | |
| | Bagley House | 1869 | Italianate | | Detroit | Was built for John Judson Bagley and later was converted into the Detroit Conservatory of Music in 1890s and demolished in 1914 for the Statler Hotel. | |
| | John Stoughton Newberry House | 1875 | Italianate | Gordon W. Lloyd | Detroit | Demolished in 1961. | |
| | Mostly Hall | 1910 | French Renassaice | John Scott & Company | Detroit | Built for Willis E. Buhl. Was demolished in 1940 | |
| | John B Ford Mansion | 1904 | Colonial Revival | Alpheus W. Chittenden | Detroit | The house was disassembled and reassembled on Windmill Pointe Drive in 1928. (Originally 8192 Jefferson) | |
| | Dr. R. Adlington Newman Mansion | 1902 | English Tudor Revival | Henry P. Kirby | Detroit | Was demolished in 1980s | |
| | Theodore D. Buhl Mansion | 1906 | Neo-Classical | John Scott & Company | Detroit | Was demolished in 1977 | |
| more images | Russell A. Alger Jr. House | 1910 | Italian Renaissance Revival | Charles Adam Platt | Grosse Pointe Farms, | Today, a community center for the Grosse Pointe Communities | |
| | Clairview | 1915 | Neo-Classical | John Scott & Company | Grosse Pointe Shores | Built for Harry N Torrey, was demolished in 1959. | |
| | Emory L Ford Mansion | 1916 | English Tudor Revival | Albert H. Spahr | Grosse Pointe Shores | Was demolished in 1944 | |
| | Stonehurst | 1915 | English Tudor Revival | Albert H. Spahr | Grosse Pointe Shores | Was built for Joseph B. Schlotman, was demolished in 1974 | |
| | Rose Terrace I | 1912 | English Tudor Revival | Albert Kahn | Grosse Pointe | Was built for Horace E Dodge and his wife Anna. When Anna became a widow, she demolished the house and built a much more luxurious house in its place. | |
| | Rose Terrace II | 1934 | Neo-Classical | Horace Traumbauer | Grosse Pointe | Was built for Anna Thompson Dodge, widow of Horace E Dodge, co-founder of Dodge Brothers Company, was the most opulent residence of Michigan and was demolished in 1976. | |
| | Herbert V Book Mansion | 1922 | French Renaissance | Louis Kamper | Grosse Pointe Park | Was destroyed by fire in 1978 | |
| | Edgemere | 1882 | Victorian | Mason & Rice | Grosse Pointe Farms | Built for Joseph H Berry, was demolished in 1941 | |
| more images | Fair Lane | 1915 | Baronial and Prairie | Joseph N. French William Van Tine Marion Mahony Griffin Frank Lloyd Wright Jens Jensen. | Dearborn | Built for Henry Ford, founder of Ford Motor Company. Today, a historical landscape and house museum | |
| | R.E Olds Residence | 1903 | Queen Anne | Darius B. Moon | Lansing | Was built for Ransom Eli Olds, founder of Oldsmobile Motor Works. Was extensively remodelled in 1952 and demolished in 1971. | |

== Minnesota ==
| Image | Name | Year built | Style | Architect | City | Notes | Ref. |
|---|---|---|---|---|---|---|---|
| more images | James J. Hill House | 1891 | Richardsonian Romanesque | Peabody and Stearns | Saint Paul | Operated by the Minnesota Historical Society | |
| more images | Glensheen Mansion | 1908 | Jacobean Revival | Clarence H. Johnston Sr. Charles W. Leavitt Jr. | Duluth | Operated by the University of Minnesota Duluth as a historic house museum | |
| | Kittson Mansion | 1884 | Second Empire | Abraham Ratcliffe | Saint Paul | Was built for Norman Wolfred Kittson, was demolished in 1908 for the Saint Paul Cathedral. | |
| more images | Southways Estate | 1918 | Georgian and Tudor Revival | Harrie T. Lindeberg | Orono, Lake Minnetonka | Built for John S. Pillsbury; demolished in 2018 | |
| | Fair Oaks | 1884 | Châteauesque | E Townsend Mix | Minneapolis | Built for William Washburn. Was demolished in 1924 | |
| | Van Dusen Mansion | 1893 | Châteauesque, Richardson Romanesque | Edgard E Joralemon | Minneapolis | Built for George Washington Van Dusen | |
| | Turnblad Mansion | 1908 | Châteauesque | Boehme and Cordella | Minneapolis | Built for Swan Turnblad, today is the American Swedish Institute. | |
| | Gates Mansion | 1914 | Mediterranean Revival, Beaux-Arts | Marshall & Fox | Minneapolis | Built for Charles Gilbert Gates, the mansion was the first private residence with air conditioning installed in USA. Demolished in 1933. | |

== Mississippi ==
| Image | Name | Year built | Style | Architect | City | Notes |
|---|---|---|---|---|---|---|
| | Longwood | 1864 | Octagonal, Oriental | Samuel Sloan | Natchez | Built for Haller Nutt. Construction began in 1859 and was never completed due to the civil war and Nutt's death in 1864. |
| | Ravennaside | 1902 | Classical Revival | | Natchez | Formerly the home of Roane Fleming Byrnes. Built to blend multiple styles and part of the nearby Ravenna settlement. |
| | Residence of R.L. Covington | 1907 | Colonial | George Franklin Barber | Hazlehurst | Today, a private residence |
| | Keys Hill | 1926 | Spanish Colonial Revival | C.H. Lindsey | Columbia | Built for Hugh L. White and owned by the Simmons family (interchangeably) since 1955. |
| | St. Mary's By The River | 1929 | Tudor Revival, Classical Revival, Mediterranean Revival | Martin Shephard | Moss Point | Unique home built in a variety of different styles. |

== Missouri ==
| Image | Name | Year built | Style | Architect | City | Notes | Ref. |
|---|---|---|---|---|---|---|---|
| | Wyeth-Tottle Mansion | 1879 | Italianante | Edmond Eckle | St Joseph | Built for John Wyeth, since 1948 is the Museum of St Joseph. | |
| | Harvey M. Vaile Mansion | 1881 | Second Empire | Asa B. Cross | Independence | Today, a museum | |
| | Robert A. Long House | 1910 | Beaux-Arts style | Henry Ford Hoit | Kansas City | Today, the Kansas City Museum | |
| | Mack B. Nelson House | 1914 | Romanesque Revival | Henry Ford Hoit | Kansas City | Built for lumber magnate Mack Nelson, now a private residence | |
| | Samuel Cupples House | 1890 | Romanesque Revival | Thomas B. Annan | St. Louis | Today, a museum | |

== Montana ==
| Image | Name | Year built | Style | Architect | City | Notes | Ref. |
|---|---|---|---|---|---|---|---|
| more images | W. A. Clark Mansion | 1884 | Romanesque Revival Victorian | C. H. Brown | Butte | Today, a bed and breakfast | |
| | Montana Governor's Residence | 1888 | Queene Anne | Hodgson, Stem, & Welter | Helena | Originally built as a residence for William Chessman, this home operated as the Governor's Residence from 1913 until 1959. | |
| | Collins Mansion | 1891 | Eclectic | | Great Falls | Built for Timothy Edwards Collins and remains a private residence | |
| | Charles E. Conrad Mansion | 1895 | Norman | Kirtland K. Cutter | Kalispell | Built for Charles E. Conrad and meant to resemble the architecture of Normandy, France. Now a museum | |
| | Moss Mansion | 1903 | English Renaissance | Henry Janeway Hardenbergh | Billings | Built for Preston Moss, and his family, now, a museum | |

== Nebraska ==
| Image | Name | Year built | Style | Architect | City | Notes | Ref |
|---|---|---|---|---|---|---|---|
| | Arbor Lodge | 1855 | Neo-Colonial | | Nebraska City | Built for J. Sterling Morton and expanded greatly up until 1903. Later lived in by Joy Morton and now a state historical park and arboretum. | |
| | George W. Frank House | 1886-1889 | Richardsonian& Shingle Style | Frank, Bailey & Farmer | Kearney | Built for George W. Frank and presently a museum. | |
| | Fairview | 1902-1903 | Classical Revival & Queene Anne | Artemus A. Roberts | Lincoln | Owned by William Jennings Bryan, a political candidate. In 1921, it was donated to what is now Bryan Health and it has been used by them since. On November 7th, 2026, it was moved to a new location. | |
| | Joslyn Castle | 1903 | Romanesque | John McDonald | Omaha | Was built for George Joslyn and today is a museum | |
| | Gottlieb Storz House | 1906 | Tudor Revival | Thomas R. Kimball | Omaha | Built for Gottlieb Storz and occupied by his descendants until 1989, when it was donated to Creighton University by Michael Gaughan. It was sold again in 2007 by the University. | |

== Nevada ==
| Image | Name | Year built | Style | Architect | City | Notes | Ref. |
|---|---|---|---|---|---|---|---|
| | Bowers Mansion | 1863 | Georgian & Italianate | J. Neely Johnson | Washoe City | Built for Lemuel Bowers and now part of a park that opens the home for tours. | |
| | Rinckel Mansion | 1875 | Late Victorian, French Victorian | Charles H. Jones | Carson City | Built for Mathias Rinckel and is owned by the Nevada Press Association | |
| | Brougher Mansion | 1904 | Queene Anne | Heidenreich, Henry | Carson City | Built for Wilson Brougher | |
| | Twaddle Mansion | 1905 | Colonial Revival | Benjamin Leon | Reno | Built for Ebenezer Twiddle in the unusual Colonial Revival style. Later became a place of worship and is now a law firm. | |
| | Joseph Giraurd House | 1914 | Colonial Revival | DeLongchamps, Frederick Joseph | Reno | Built for Joseph Giraurd and later owed by Roy Hardy. | |

== New Jersey ==
| Image | Name | Year built | Style | Architect | City | Notes | Ref. |
|---|---|---|---|---|---|---|---|
| | J. Harper Smith Mansion | 1880 | High Victorian, Queen Anne, Stick/Eastlake | Frank L. Bodine; Horace Trumbauer | Somerville | Originally built for J. Harper Smith | |
| | Glenmont | 1881 | Queen Anne | Henry Hudson Holly | West Orange | Originally built for Henry Pedder, Thomas Edison moved in 1885 | |
| | The Towers or Aladdin Castle | 1881 | Queen Anne | | Elberon | Originally built for Cornelius K. Garrison, was sold to Salomon R Guggenheim in 1900. The House was demolished in 1940. | |
| | Lambert Castle | 1892 | Romanesque and medieval | | Paterson | Was built for Catholina Lambert and today is a museum. | |
| more images | Florham | 1893 | English Baroque Revival | McKim, Mead & White; Frederick Law Olmsted (landscape) | Madison and Florham Park | Part of the Fairleigh Dickinson University | |
| more images | Georgian Court | 1899 | Georgian Revival | Bruce Price | Lakewood | Today, part of Georgian Court University | |
| | Kenilwood | 1901 | Beaux Arts | George B. Post | Bernardsville | Built for broker George B. Post Jr. by his father, now, owned by Mike Tyson | |
| more images | Rutherfurd Hall | 1902 | Tudor Revival | Whitney Warren; Olmsted Brothers (landscape) | Allamuchy Township | Owned and managed by the Allamuchy School District | |
| | First Shadow Lawn | 1903 | Colonial Revival | | West Long Branch | Built for John A McCall. Destroyed by fire in 1927 | |
| more images | Blairsden | 1903 | French Renaissance | Carrère and Hastings | Peapack-Gladstone | Formerly a retreat house for the Sisters of St. John the Baptist | |
| | Darlington Manor | 1907 | Jacobean Revival | James Brite | Mahwah | Built for George Crocker. Today it is still a private home. | |
| | Krueger Mansion | 1888 | Late Victorian | Henry Schultz | Newark | In late 2020, the city and the company Makerhoods broke ground on refurbishing the mansion into live/work spaces for local experienced "makers" in the food, beauty, craft and other small-scale artisan industries for $1800 a month by application only. | |
| | Dr George Gil Green House | 1876 | Second Empire | Paschal Madera | Woodbury | The house was extensively renovated in the 1940s finally destroyed by fire in 1968. | |

== New York ==
| Image | Name | Year built | Style | Architect | City | Notes | Ref. |
|---|---|---|---|---|---|---|---|
| | Werah | 1743 (renovated 1899, 1920) | Italianate (original) Greek Revival (1920 renovation) | Howard Major (alterations). | Glen Cove | Italianate residence constructed for the Latting family of Lattingtown on a large farm. Later sold to John Alvin Young and then Edward Irving Eldridge Jr. Eldridge had renovations done to the Greek Revival style in 1920 and it was later converted into the Glen Cove Gurdawa. | |
| more images | Beechwood | 1780 (renovated 1890s) | Neo-classical Federal, Colonial Revival (renovation) | R. H. Robertson (1890s renovation); William Welles Bosworth (c. 1907 renovation) | Briarcliff Manor | Converted to condominium apartments in the 1980s | |
| | Cedarmere | 1787 (renovated 1843, rebuilt 1903) | Colonial Revival, Classical Revival | Richard Kirk, Ogden Codman Jr. | Roslyn Harbor | Colonial farmhouse later renovated numerous times by William Cullen Bryant and then rebuilt after a 1902 fire. | |
| | G. R. Underhill House | 1820 (renovated c. 1915, 1950) | Colonial | | Lattingtown | Original farmhouse built for the Underhill family. Eventually sold to Paul Bonynge who renovated house into a country seat. Subsequently passed to the Mcdonalds who remodeled house and then George Haggerty. | |
| | Matinecock Farms | 1830 (renovated 1900, 1920) | Colonial Revival | Bradley Delehanty | Lattingtown | Constructed for the Cock family and later owned by the Ryan family. Renovated in 1900 and then again in 1920 for Frank W. M. Cutcheon. | |
| more images | Mills Mansion | 1832 (renovated c. 1895) | Colonial (1792 original); Greek Revival (1832 replacement); Beaux-Arts (1895 renovation) | McKim, Mead, and White (1890s renovation) | Staatsburg | Today, located within Ogden Mills & Ruth Livingston Mills State Park | |
| more images | Lyndhurst | 1838 | Gothic Revival | Alexander Jackson Davis | Tarrytown | Owned by the National Trust for Historic Preservation and open to the public | |
| | Meadow Croft | 1850 (renovated 1891-1892) | Colonial Revival | I.H. Green | Sayville | Farmhouse constructed in 1850 and purchased in 1873 by Robert Barnwell Roosevelt. In 1891, his son John Ellis Roosevelt commissioned a large Colonial Revival structure to be added onto farmhouse. Eventually added to Sans Souci County Park and is periodically opened for tours. | |
| more images | Wilderstein | 1852 | Italianate (original); Queen Anne (1888 renovation) | John Warren Ritch, Arnout Cannon, Joseph Burr Tiffany, Calvert Vaux (landscape) | Rhinebeck | Today, operated as a house museum | |
| | Dewey House | 1860 (expanded 1900) | Gothic | Frederick S. Copley | Roslyn Harbor | Originally constructed in 1860 by William Cullen Bryant for Joshua Dewey. In 1900, Lloyd S Bryce bought property and built Clayton. However, he needed guest housing so he lifted the Dewey House on stilts and added a bottom floor to the house. Later stayed at by Teddy Roosevelt and Woodrow Wilson. Now part of the Nassau County Museum Of Art but in need of renovations. | |
| | Armour-Stiner House | 1860 | Eclectic: Octagon Mode | | Irvington | Today, a museum | |
| | Orchard Hill | 1860 | A.J. Downing style | | Westbury | Residence constructed circa 1860 for John Hicks. Later bought by John Phipps and given to his daughter Peggie Phipps as a birthday present in 1930. Was enlarged sometime throughout its lifetime and is now a wedding venue for Old Westbury Gardens. | |
| | Vermland | 1862 | Second Empire | Cornelius Henry Delamater | Asharoken | Built for and presumably by Cornelius Henry Delamater who called it Vermland. Later called The Bevin House and has passed through many owners. | |
| | Bay Villa | 1862 | Second Empire | | Staten Island | Built for John M Pendleton, it was the summer house of Anson Phelps Stokes between 1868 and 1886, was abandoned in 1910s and later demolished in 1930. | |
| | The Cliffs | 1863-1864 | Gothic Revival | Henry G. Harrison | Oyster Bay | Built for James William Beekman, and has remained a private residence. Recently sold. | |
| | Sherman D Phelps House | 1870 | Second Empire | Isaak G Perry | Binghamton | Today, a museum | |
| more images | Olana | 1872 | Eclectic | Calvert Vaux | Greenport | Today, operated as a house and property museum. Home to Frederic Edwin Church | |
| more images | Glenview | 1877 | Late Victorian | Charles W. Clinton | Yonkers | Today, houses the Hudson River Museum | |
| | Hillside | 1878 | Shingle Colonial | Potter & Robinson | Oyster Bay | Constructed for Sarah Sampson Adam (daughter of Isaac Sampson) on large estate with landscaping by Beatrix Jones Farrand. Later sold to Richard Derby and his wife Ethel Roosevelt Derby, who lived there until 1977. Eventually converted into the Landmark Colony of Oyster Bay. | |
| more images | Castle Rock | 1881 | Romanesque Revival | J. Morgan Slade | Garrison | Private residence | |
| more images | Idle Hour | 1882 | Tudor Revival | Richard Morris Hunt | Oakdale | Burned down in 1899 | |
| | Gen. Edward F. Jones House | 1883 | Queen Anne | | Binghamton | Built for Edward F. Jones, now, a private residence | |
| | Sagamore Hill | 1884 | Queen Anne | Lamb and Rich | Cove Neck | Built for President Theodore Roosevelt | |
| | Westbrook | 1886 | Tudor Revival | Charles C Haight | Great River | Built for William Bayard Cutting, as part of large estate. Soon, first private golf course in the country was built on the estate. Eventually, in 1936 it was given to the Long Island State Park Commission and converted into Bayard Cutting Arboretum State Park. | |
| more images | Rockwood Hall | 1886 | Elizabethan | Gervase Wheeler (1849 house); Ebenezer L. Roberts and Carrère and Hastings (c. 1890 renovation) | Mount Pleasant | It was the second-largest house in the U.S.; Demolished c. 1941 | |
| | Gratwick Mansion | 1888 | Richardsonian Romanesque | H.H Richardson | Buffalo | Built for William Henry Gratwick, demolished in 1919. | |
| | Duryea Mansion | 1887 | Queen Anne | | Glen Cove | Constructed for Henrick Vanderbilt Duryea, founder of Duryea Starch Factory. Extant 24-room mansion in great condition. | |
| | Hamlin Mansion | 1889 | Richardsonian Romanesque | James H. Marling and Herbert C. Burdett | Buffalo | Built for William C. Hamlin, was demolished in 1937. | |
| | Wheatly | 1890-1900 | Colonial and Dutch Farmhouse | Mckim, Mead & White | Old Westbury | Built over a 10 year period for Edwin D. Morgan as a self-sustaining mansion complex. In the 1950s, amidst development, the center portion of the main house and parts of the wall and gateway were torn down. Two side wings are extant. | |
| | Henry D. Whiton residence | 1890 | Tudor Revival and Elizabethan | Alfred C. Bossom | Hewlett | Constructed for Henry D. Whiton. Later converted into the Lawrence Country Day School which later became Lawrence Woodmere Academy. Subsequently owned by the Hebrew Academy of Long Beach and is now the Stella K. Abraham High School for Girls. | |
| | The 19th Hole | 1890 | Queen Anne Eclectic | Isaac R. Downing | Glen Cove | Constructed for G. Stafford Bucknall, whose parents lived at "Leahead" in the Red Spring Colony. | |
| | "Bide-A-Wee" | 1891-1892 | Shingle | unknown Oliver D. Combes (additions) | Glen Cove | Constructed for S.W. Milligan and later sold to J.K.O. Sherwood in the ever-growing Red Spring Colony. Sherwood was a founder of the colony. | |
| | Reid Hall | 1892 | Romanesque and medieval | Stanford White | Purchase | Was built for Whitelaw Reid, Is part of the Manhattanville College since 1951. | |
| | Yaddo Mansion | 1893 | Romanesque and Tudor Revival | William Halsey Wood | Saratoga Springs | Was built for Spencer Trask. Since 1900 is an artists' community. | |
| | The Birches | 1893-1894 (renovated 1906 & 1915) | Neo-Colonial | Woodruff Leeming & Messrs. Little, Browne & Moore, Howard Major | Glen Cove | Constructed for Harvey Murdock, founder of North Country Colony. Later sold to Samuel Brewster who renovated house significantly in 1915, essentially re-doing it from the ground up. Presently abandoned and in need of preservation. | |
| | "Hermosa" | 1893-1894 | Shingle | Woodruff Leeming & Messrs. Little, Bowne, & Moore, A.F. Brinckerhoff (alterations) | Glen Cove | Residence originally constructed for George R. Fowler in North Country Colony. Built by C.S. Watkins and occupied until early 1910s. Renovated in 1914 to present, drastically different state. | |
| more images | Estherwood | 1894 | Renaissance Revival | Buchman & Deisler | Dobbs Ferry | Today, located on the campus of The Masters School | |
| | "The Willows" | 1894-1896 | Colonial &Shingle | Montrose W. Morris | Glen Cove | Self-Designed house for and by Montrose W. Morris in the North Country Colony. Subsequently occupied by Frederick W. Wurster and Morris Hadley, at separate instances. | |
| | Wyckoff Mansion | 1895 | Tudor Revival | William Henry Miller | Carleton Island | Was built for William O. Wyckoff, the mansion is abandoned today. | |
| more images | Woodlea | 1895 | Renaissance Revival and Beaux-Arts | McKim, Mead & White | Briarcliff Manor | Today, the Sleepy Hollow Country Club | |
| more images | Alexander Brown House | 1895 | Richardsonian Romanesque | Gordon Wright | Syracuse | | |
| | Germelwyn | 1896 | Colonial Revival | C.P.H. Gilbert | Glen Cove | Constructed for Leonard J. Busby and later owned by his children and son-in-law Thomas Lonsdale Leeming. Eventually converted into the North Shore Day School and Camp. | |
| more images | Brookholt | 1897 | Colonial Revival | John Russell Pope | East Meadow | Destroyed by fire in 1934 | |
| more images | Indian Neck Hall | 1897 | Georgian | Ernest Flagg | Oakdale | Part of the Long Island campus of St. John's University | |
| | Grenville Clark Sr. Residence | c. 1898 | Long Island Farmhouse | N/A | Albertson | Purchased by Grenville Clark in early 1920s from unknown owner. Later become Clark Botanical Gardens. | |
| | Charlon House | 1898 | Colonial Revival | | Glen Cove | Constructed for Charles A. Frank and later owned by David Hurst Knott. Extant house | |
| | Burrwood | 1898–1899 | | Carrère and Hastings | Long Island | One of the Gold Coast Mansions, has been torn down | |
| more images | Henry W. Poor House (also known as Poor's Palace and Woodland) | 1899 | Jacobean | T. Henry Randall | Tuxedo Park | Later owned by Henry Morgan Tilford | |
| more images | Hyde Park | 1899 | Beaux-Arts | McKim, Mead & White | Hyde Park | Owned and operated by the National Park Service | |
| | "Groendak" | 1899 (altered 1924) | Tudor | C.P.H. Gilbert, Harrie Lindeberg (alterations) | Glen Cove | Constructed for Parker D. Handy in the Dutch style. Later sold to Henry Clifford Martin and altered significantly. Interior murals and designs done by Arbam Poole and Samuel Yellin. Subsequently owned by Robert M. Fromm and Samuel Katz. | |
| | Oakdene/Waldene | 1900 | Colonial Revival | Grosvenor Atterbury | Roslyn | Built for Walter G. Oakman sometime around 1900, and later owned by Henry D. Walbridge. Fire destroyed the house in 1946. | |
| | Villa D'Orsay | 1900 (alterations in 1918) | Shingle, Georgian | Butler & Corse, Howard Major (alterations) | Glen Cove | Constructed for William Beard, financier. Beard had the house renovated and altered significantly in 1915. Later sold to Joel David Woodside, Samuel Croft Register (who called it Demingcroft), and Reginald E. Gillmore. | |
| | Clayton | 1900 | Georgian Revival | Ogden Codman Jr. | Roslyn Harbor | Built for William Cullen Bryant, later owned by Lloyd S. Bryce and now the Nassau County Museum of Art. | |
| | Terrace Hall | 1900 | Tudor | Renwick, Aspinwall & Owen | Lawrence | Constructed for Richard Augustus Peabody, and later owned by William Raymond Sr. and Isaac Gamel. Presently the Rockaway Hunting Club. | |
| more images | Idle Hour | 1901 | English Country | Richard Howland Hunt | Oakdale | Formerly part of Dowling College | |
| more images | Waldheim | 1901 | Tudor Revival | Olmstead Brothers (grounds) | Scarborough-on-Hudson | Sold in 1946, subdivided into residential lots, and torn down in 1955 | |
| more images | Harbor Hill | 1902 | French Renaissance Revival | McKim, Mead & White | East Hills | Demolished in 1947 | |
| | Dosoris | 1902 | Georgian Revival | James Brite | Glen Cove | Constructed for Herbert Lee Pratt in 1902 as a country house. Just 9 years later, Pratt realized he wanted to upgrade and demolished 2/3 of the house, retaining one wing which is now used as the "White House" by Webb Institute, which purchased the house's replacement "The Braes" in 1947. | |
| more images | Harry E. Donnell House | 1902 | Tudor Revival | Harry E. Donnell; Randall & Miller | Eatons Neck | | |
| | Knole | 1903 | | Carrère and Hastings | Westbury | Built for Herman B. Duryea | |
| | Nassau Hall | 1904 | Neoclassical | Delano & Aldrich | Muttontown | Built for over 9 years for Bronson Winthrop. It was modeled after Mount Vernon, and is now part of the Muttontown Preserve. | |
| | The Netherlands | 1904 | Shingle | H. Craig Severance | Hempstead | Built for William S. Hofstra. His family later sold the house to be used for public good and it is now the administrative building at Hofstra University. | |
| | Boldt Castle | 1904 | Châteauesque and Romanesque | GW & WD Hewitt | Alexandria Bay | Built for George Boldt, today is a tourist attraction. | |
| | Greentree | 1904 | Dutch Colonial | D'Hauteville & Copper, Guy Lowell. | Manhasset | Owned by the Whitney Families throughout the 20th century, and is presently ran by the Greentree Foundation. | |
| | Rochroane Castle | 1905 | Medieval | A.J.Manning | Irvington | Was built for Melchior Stewart Beltzhoover, was destroyed by fire in 1970s. | |
| more images | Laurelton Hall | 1905 | Art Nouveau | Louis Comfort Tiffany | Laurel Hollow | Burned down in 1957 | |
| | Jericho Farms | 1906 | Georgian Revival | John Russell Pope | Jericho | Constructed for Middleton S. Burrill on 1,000 acre estate. Later reduced to half its size and converted into the Meadowbrook Golf Club. | |
| | Cedarcroft | 1906 | Italian Renaissance | Albro & Lindeberg | Glen Cove | Constructed for Arthur Wickes Rossiter and later resided in by Ella D. Guthrie of Meudon. Eventually sold to Bouvier "Buddy" Beale and went under a restoration in 2014. | |
| more images | Westbury House | 1906 | Carolean Revival | George A. Crawley | Old Westbury | A house museum open for tours | |
| | Knollwood | 1906 | Italian Renaissance | Hiss and Weekes | Muttontown | Built for Charles Hudson and later owned by the Senff family. Final weed was King Zog of Albania, who attempted to use it as an exile-palace. He was denied and the house was subsequently demolished. | |
| | Webb Horton Mansion | 1906 | Romanesque | Frank Lindsay | Middletown | Today part of the SUNY Orange Campus | |
| more images | Welwyn | 1906 | Georgian Revival | Babb, Cook & Willard; Delano & Aldrich (1920 renovation) | Glen Cove | Site of the Holocaust Memorial and Tolerance Center of Nassau County since 1992 | |
| | Rosemary Farm | 1907 | Shingle | Wilson Eyre | Lloyd Harbor | Built for Roland Ray Conklin in 1907. Later adjoined by a large Open-Air Amphitheater which was used for many large plays and productions throughout the early 1900s. Eventually, it was sold to the Seminary of the Immaculate Conception and was left abandoned in the 1980s. Almost entirely burnt down by fire in 1990. | |
| more images | Arden | 1909 | Beaux Arts | Carrère and Hastings | Harriman | Built for Edward Henry Harriman, now owned by the Research Center on Natural Conservation | |
| | The Manor | 1909-1910 | Georgian | Charles A. Platt | Glen Cove | Built for John Teele Pratt and was later converted into the Harriman House conference center. Finally repurposed as the Glen Cove Mansion Hotel. | |
| | Coindre Hall | 1910-1912 | Renaissance, French Chateausque | Clarence Sumner Luce and J.V. Harriman | Huntington | Built for George McKesson Brown from 1910-1912. Later owned by Brothers of Sacred Heart and presently a Suffolk County Park. | |
| | Tullaroan | 1910 | Neo-Federal | James W O'Connor | North Hills | Built for James P. Grace with landscaping by the Olmsted Brothers. Later renovated by Horace Trumbauer and now the Deepdale Golf Club. | |
| | Eagle's Nest | 1910 | Spanish Revival | Warren & Wetmore | Centerport | Built for William K. Vanderbilt II, and gradually expanded for decades until approximately 1930. Later converted into the Vanderbilt Museum, which holds art and retains a planetarium. | |
| | Killenworth | 1911-1913 | Tudor Revival | Trowbridge and Ackerman | Glen Cove | Built for George Dupont Pratt to replace ruins of an earlier mansion destroyed by fire. Sold in the early 1940s to a truck company and then the Soviet Union. Now used as a diplomatic retreat. | |
| | Portledge | 1910 | Tudor | Howard Greenley | Matinecock | Constructed for Charles Albert Coffin on 130 acre estate. Later owned by his daughter and then the North Shore Bird and Game Sanctuary. Presently Portledge School | |
| more images | Hempstead House (also known as Castle Gould) | 1912 | Gothic Revival | August Allen | Sands Point | Started by Howard Gould and completed by Daniel Guggenheim | |
| | Munnysunk | 1912 (renovated earlier farmhouse) | Long Island Farmhouse | H Craig Severance | Lattingtown | Early 19th century farmhouse altered and renovated by Frank Bailey. Later converted into Bailey Arboretum. | |
| | The Braes | 1912-1913 | Jacobean | James Brite | Glen Cove | Replaced an earlier c. 1902 mansion on the Dosoris estate. Both houses were built for Herbert Lee Pratt and this present residence has been since converted into the Webb institute. | |
| | Land of Clover | 1912 | Adam, Georgian | Archibald Brown | Nissequogue | Constructed for Lathrop Brown with two unique curved wings on an estate featuring a circular horse stable. Later became The Knox School. | |
| | Blythewood | 1913 | Georgian Revival | Henry Otis Chapman | Muttontown | Constructed for George Smith and sold to Alfred Cotton Bedford in 1923. Bedford had landscaping done by Charles Leavitt & Sons and renamed estate "Pemberton." Later sold to Alfred L. Hoffman Sr. who called property "Radnor House," and sold it to Dr. Frank H Netter & Alan Stam. | |
| more images | Kykuit | 1913 | Colonial Revival | Delano & Aldrich; William Welles Bosworth (renovation) | Pocantico Hills | Built for John Davison Rockefeller, the richest man in modern history. Owned by the National Trust for Historic Preservation | |
| | Frank C. Crowell Residence | 1913 | Dutch Colonial Revival | George J. Hardway | Great Neck Estates | Residence constructed for Frank & Isabel C. Crowell. Sold to John Jacob Atwater Sr. in 1920 and later sold by the family to become the Great Neck Estates Village Hall. | |
| | Matinecock Point | 1911-1913 | Georgian Colonial | Christopher Grant LaFarage | Glen Cove | Mansion constructed for John Pierpont Morgan Jr. on East Island. Later became a nun convent and was demolished in 1980. | |
| | Walter J. Vreeland Residence | 1914 | Tudor Revival | Carreto & Foster | Kings Point | Constructed for Walter J. Vreeland, and subsequently sold to Judith Friedman. It was finally part of a trust company before being bought and incorporated into the USMMA. | |
| | Woodbury House | 1915 | Tudor | Cross & Cross | Woodbury | Constructed for James Watson Webb II and later sold to Edward Tinker. After threat of demolition in 1950s, Gilbert Tilles would buy the house. Eventually, he donated it to the Town of Oyster Bay and it is now the Syosset-Woodbury Community Park. | |
| | Joseph Bryant Residence | 1915 | Dutch Colonial | Frank J. Foster | Kings Point | Residence part of the Grenwolde development first owned by Joseph Bryant. Subsequently in the hands of Charles Neiley and later converted into Quarters A as part of the USMMA. | |
| | Mayhacit II | 1916-1917 | Georgian | Walker & Gillette | Glen Cove | Constructed for Francis Lyman Hine as a replacement of his earlier house in Red Spring Colony. Later converted into the Bayberry Bath & Tennis Club and more notably Fiedel Day School. Finally became Condominiums after a period of abandonment in the 1980s. | |
| more images | DuPont-Guest Estate (also known as White Eagle) | 1916 | Georgian Revival | Carrère and Hastings | Brookville | Since 1972, it has been part of the Old Westbury campus of the New York Institute of Technology | |
| | Bonnie Blink | 1916 | Federal | Horace Trumbaeur | Lake Success | Residence constructed for Henry Phipps and completed in 1919. Used by British Children in World War 2 before becoming the Phipps Administrative Building in the Great Neck School District. | |
| | Ormston House | 1916 | Tudor Revival | Betram Goodhue | Locust Valley | Built for financier John E. Aldred on the footprint of Lattingtown, which was demolished by Aldred & William Dameron Guthrie in 1900. Presently Saint Josephat's Monastery. | |
| | Trabue Pittman Residence | 1916 | Beaux Arts, French Renaissance | | Kings Point | Reports indicate that Trabue Pittman first owned this property in 1916. He most likely constructed the house this year, later selling it to Thomas Meighan. Potential remodeling rebuilding in 1942. Now part of the United States Merchant Academy. | |
| | Forker House | 1916 | French Renaissance | Henry Otis Chapman, Charles Leavitt & Sons w/ John Jacob Levinson | Kings Point | Built for Henri Bendel and later renovated by Walter P. Chrysler. Eventually converted into the United States Merchant Academy. | |
| | Delbarton | 1916 | Spanish Renaissance | Addison Mizner | Old Westbury | Constructed for I. Townsend Burden in a U-shaped fashion. Later owned by deLancey Kountze and finally the New York Institute of Technology. | |
| more images | Winfield Hall | 1917-1918 | Italian Renaissance | Gilbert, Charles P.H. | Glen Cove | Privately Owned | |
| | Norwich House | 1917-1920 | Georgian | Little & Brown. | Upper Brookville | Built for Frank C. B. Page, and later converted into a Soviet Union retreat. In 2016, the U.S. government had the residence vacated and it has been unoccupied since. | |
| | Hutfield | 1917 | Georgian Revival | John Russell Pope (alterations by James W O'Connor) | Brookville | Constructed for J. Randolph Robinson and later sold to Philip Green Gossler. Finally sold to E.F. Hutton who had alterations done. Bought by Long Island University in 1962 and owned since. | |
| more images | Beacon Towers | 1918 | Gothic Châteauesque | Hunt & Hunt | Sands Point | Demolished in 1945 | |
| | Mallow | 1918 | Georgian Revival | William W. Bosworth | Oyster Bay | Built for Walter Farwell and later converted into the East Woods School. Well-preserved interior today. | |
| | Northcourt | 1918 | English Tudor | James W. O'Connor | North Hills | Built for Lawrence Hobart Shearman and later sold to Frederick Lunning. Eventually converted into Buckley Country Day School. | |
| | Coe Hall | 1918-1921 | Tudor Revival | Guy Lowell; Career & Hastings | Oyster Bay | Built for William R. Coe as a replacement for a previous mansion that was destroyed by fire. Given to New York State in 1949 and is now a Historic Park and House Museum. | |
| more images | Oheka Castle | 1919 | Châteauesque | Delano & Aldrich; Olmsted Brothers (landscape) | West Hills | A member of Historic Hotels of America | |
| more images | Inisfada | 1920 | Tudor Revival | John T. Windrim | North Hills | Demolished in December 2013 | |
| | Claralea | 1920 | Italian Renaissance | Schwartz & Gross, B.N. Marcus | Kings Point | Constructed for Sidney H. March and later sold to Max Horowitz. Subsequently, the estate saw ownership by Ed Wynn, Ellsworth M. Slalter, and Nicholas M. Schenk. Finally, it became part of the USMMA in 1942. | |
| | Hillwood | 1921-1929 | Tudor Revival | Charles Hart | Brookville | Built for Marjorie Merriweather Post and later donated to Long Island University and converted into the C.W. Post campus. | |
| more images | Lillian Sefton Dodge Estate (also known as Sefton Manor and Mill Neck Manor) | 1922 | Tudor Revival | Clinton and Russell | Mill Neck | Today, the Mill Neck Manor Lutheran School for the Deaf | |
| | Holland House | 1922 | Colonial | Aymar Embury II | Uniondale | Constructed for Maxwell Stevenson by Aymar Embury II. It was purchased in 1946 and now serves as an Admissions building. | |
| | Underhill Farm / Killingworth | 1922 (early 1700s core) | Eclectic Mix | Harrie Lindeberg | Lattingtown | Pre-revolutionary house known as "Underhill Farm" redone and added onto significantly for Myron C. Taylor in 1922 (only one bedroom was kept in the original Colonial style). Later became Episcopal Diocese of Long Island and now a residence again undergoing renovation. | |
| | Chelsea | 1923 | French Renaissance | Williams Adams Delano | Muttontown | Modeled after a Chinese residence seen by owner Benjamin Moore in 1921. Later given to Nassau County and is now part of The Muttontown Preserve. | |
| | Falaise | 1923 | French Norman | Frederick J. Sterner, Polhemus & Coffin | Sands Point | Residence constructed for Harry F. Guggenheim on 90 acre estate given by his father Daniel Guggenheim. After Harry passed in 1971, Falaise became a house museum. | |
| | Green Arbors | 1924 (mid 1700s core) | Colonial | John J. Weeks | Locust Valley | Constructed for the Weeks family c. 1672 on Native American property. Added onto / Renovated in the 1750s, 1850s (after a fire destroyed 17th century wing), 1925, and 1970. Formally titled Green Arbors when it was owned by Robert A. Lovett from the 1920s to 1940s. Subsequently owned by Charles P. Grimes, George Rose, and the Elys. | |
| more images | Poplar Hill | 1925 | French Renaissance | Charles A. Platt | Glen Cove | Built for Frederick Bailey Pratt in 1925. Later turned into Glengariff Nursing Home. Was left abandoned and now run as a rehabilitation center of the same name. | |
| | Caumsett | 1925 | Georgian | John Russell Pope | Lloyd Harbor | Built for Marshall Field III, and partially demolished in the early 1950s. Remaining 3 wings are part of Caumsett State Park today. | |
| | "Thayer House" | 1925 | Colonial Revival | | Glen Cove | Constructed for Robert D. Pruyn on land leased by John Teele Pratt by an unknown architect. Later given back to the Pratt's, who sold the property in 1956 to Glen Cove City School District. | |
| | Highpool | 1926 | French Manor | Carrere & Hastings | Brookville | Estate constructed for William Deering Howe, and converted into the Long Island Lutheran Middle & High School in 1959. | |
| | J. Randolph Robinson Residence | 1927 | Georgian Revival | William Lawrence Bottomley | Brookville | Constructed for J. Randolph Robinson and purchased in 1966 by Long Island University for their Brookville campus. Is now Bush-Brown Hall. | |
| | Chanticlare | 1927-1928 | English Tudor | Frederick A. Godley | Flower Hill | Unique 42-room Tudor house built for Jesse J. Ricks. After years of being a private residence, attempts were made to save and repurpose the mansion in the 1960s but was eventually torn down. Guest House extant as of 2026 as a private residence. | |
| | Rynwood | 1927 | Cotswold | Roger Bullard | Glen Head | Built for Samuel A. Salvage and named after his wife, who was nicknamed "Ryn." Many notable designers of the time worked on the house, which is now used by Banfi Vintners as headquarters. | |
| | Mariemont | 1927 | Federal | John Russell Pope | Brookville | Residence constructed for Henry Wheeler Lowe. Replaced an earlier house destroyed by fire. Later sold to Wiliam E. Hutton II and eventually to Long Island University in 1965. Now Hutton Hall. | |
| | Lannin House | 1928 | Tudor | Oliver Tajden | East Meadow | Built for Dorothy Lannin as a replacement for another residence that had burnt down. Later used as the Nassau County Historical Museum before being incorporated into Eisenhower Park. | |
| | Adelaide Breevort Hutton residence | 1928 | Tudor Revival | Hart & Shape | Brookville | Residence constructed for Adelaide Breevort Hutton, daughter of Marjorie Merriweather Post. Later donated to Long Island University along with Post's Hillwood mansion. | |
| | The Chimneys | 1929 | Tudor Revival | Edgar Irving Williams | Sands Point | Built for Bettie Fleischmann Holmes, and later home to the grandfather of Elizabeth Holmes. In 1944, the house was lent to the War Shipping Administration who occupied it until 1954 when it was sold to the Long Island Jewish Congregation. Now The Community Synagogue of Port Washington. | |
| | Salutation | 1929 | Georgian Colonial | Roger Bullard | Glen Cove | Built for Junius Spencer Morgan on the former Paul Dana estate "Dosoris." Entire Island placed for sale in 2017 eventually sold. | |
| | Yarrow | 1930 | Colonial Revival | Bradley Delehanty | Nissequoque | Residence constructed for William J. Ryan in 1930. Currently the Nissequogue Golf Club. | |
| | Windermere House | 1930 | Federal | | Mill Neck | Constructed for William DeNyse Nichols Perine, and later sold to Robert and Alice Simpson. Still standing and in private hands. | |
| | Bogheid | 1938 | French Manor | Delano and Aldrich | Glen Cove | Extant private residence built for Helen Prybil. After being abandoned for some time, it was recently renovated and is now for sale. | |
| | Old Orchard | 1938 | Georgian | Wiliam G. McMillan Jr. | Cove Neck | Constructed for Theodore Roosevelt Jr. on Sagamore Hill estate. Mr Roosevelt only resided there for 3 years and eventually passed away in World War 2. Estate later became Sagamore Hill National Historic Site, including this house which is now a museum. | |
| | The Charles S. Roberston Residence | 1938 | Georgian Revival | Mott B. Schmidt | Cold Spring Harbor | Constructed for Charles Sammis Robertson on 19 acres. Donated to the Cold Spring Harbor Laboratory in 1976 and used as the Banbury Conference Center since. | |

=== New York City ===
| Image | Name | Year built | Style | Architect | City | Notes | Ref. |
|---|---|---|---|---|---|---|---|
| | Libbey Castle/Woodcliff Castle | 1857 | Medieval | Alexander Jackson Davies | New York City | Built for Augustus C Richards, was demolished in 1931 for the construction of Fort Tryon Park. | |
| | Alexander Turney Stewart House | 1869 | Second Empire | John Kellum | New York City | Demolished in 1901 | |
| | Frederic W. Stevens House | 1876 | Châteauesque | George Harney | New York City | The house was demolished in 1919 | |
| | George Kemp House | 1876 | Châteauesque | RC Jones | New York City | Demolished in 1910 | |
| more images | William K. Vanderbilt House | 1882 | Châteauesque | Richard Morris Hunt | New York City | Built for William Kissam Vanderbilt and Alva Vanderbilt. Demolished in 1927 | |
| more images | Villard Houses | 1882 | Renaissance Revival | McKim, Mead & White | New York City | Today is part of the New York Palace Hotel | |
| | Hutchinson-Alexander Mansion | 1882 | Châteauesque | George B Post | New York City | Originally built for William J Hutchinson, later sold to Charles Beatty Alexander and Hattie Crocker, the house was greatly enlarged in 1907 and demolished in 1943. | |
| more images | William H. Vanderbilt House | 1883 | Renaissance Revival | John B. Snook, Charles B. Atwood | New York City | Built for William Henry Vanderbilt. It was later property of Cornelius Vanderbilt III and Grace Vanderbilt. Was demolished in 1947 | |
| more images | Cornelius Vanderbilt II House | 1883 | Châteauesque | Richard Morris Hunt George B. Post | New York City | Built for Cornelius Vanderbilt II and Alice Vanderbilt. Demolished in 1926 | |
| | Jacob Ruppert Sr House | 1883 | Second Empire | William Schickel | New York City | Demolished in 1925 | |
| more images | Florence and Eliza Vanderbilt House | 1883 | Châteauesque | John B. Snook | New York City | Built for Florence Vanderbilt and Eliza Vanderbilt. Were demolished in 1917 and 1925 respectively | |
| | Isaac Vail Brokaw House | 1883 | Châteauesque | Rose and Stone | New York City | Built for Isaac Vail Brokaw .Was demolished in 1965 | |
| | Louis Comfort Tiffany House | 1885 | Romanesque, Queen Anne | Louis Comfort Tiffany and Standford White | New York City | Built for Louis Comfort Tiffany and his family. Was demolished in 1936 | |
| more images | James Bailey House | 1888 | Romanesque Revival | Samuel B. Reed | New York City | Built for James Anthony Bailey of the Barnum & Bailey Circus | |
| | William Van Duzer Lawrance House | 1889 | Châteauesque | Richard Morris Hunt | New York City | Demolished in 1937 | |
| | Henry Osborne Havemeyer House | 1890 | Romanesque | Charles Coolidge Haight | New York City | Demolished in 1930 | |
| more images | James Hampden Robb and Cornelia Van Rensselaer Robb House | 1892 | Italian Renaissance Revival | McKim, Mead & White | New York City | Today, a cooperative apartment | |
| more images | Henry T. Sloane House | 1894 | French Renaissance Revival | Carrère and Hastings | New York City | Built for Henry T Sloane. Later owned by Hamad bin Khalifa Al Thani, the former Emir of Qatar | |
| | Collins P Huntington House | 1894 | Romanesque | George B Post | New York City | Demolished in 1926 | |
| more images | Mrs. William B. Astor House | 1896 | French Renaissance Revival | Richard Morris Hunt | New York City | Built for Caroline Astor and John Jacob Astor IV. Was demolished around 1926 | |
| | Charles Tyson Yerkes House | 1896 | Romanesque | RH Robertson | New York City | Demolished in 1925 | |
| | Elbridge Thomas Garry House | 1897 | Châteauesque | Richard Morris Hunt | New York City | Demolished in 1929 | |
| | Josephine Del Drago House | 1898 | Châteauesque | | New York City | Demolished in 1911 for the Knickerbocker Club | |
| more images | Gertrude Rhinelander Waldo House | 1898 | French Renaissance Revival | Kimball & Thompson | New York City | Today is the Ralph Lauren flagship store | |
| more images | William H. Moore House | 1898 | Renaissance Revival | McKim, Mead & White | New York City | Formerly the America-Israel Cultural Foundation | |
| more images | Harry F. Sinclair House | 1898 | French Gothic | C. P. H. Gilbert | New York City | Since 1955, it has been owned by the Ukrainian Institute of America | |
| more images | Stuyvesant Fish House | 1898 | Italianate | McKim, Mead and White | New York City | Today, headquarters of Bloomberg Philanthropies | |
| more images | Oliver Gould Jennings House | 1898 | Beaux-Arts | Carrère and Hastings | New York City | Owned by Hamad bin Khalifa Al Thani, the former Emir of Qatar | |
| | George Crocker House | 1899 | Beaux-Arts | Brigth & Bacon | New York City | Demolished in 1930 | |
| more images | Benjamin N. Duke House | 1901 | Beaux-Arts | Welch, Smith & Provot | New York City | Owned by Carlos Slim | |
| more images | Andrew Carnegie Mansion | 1901 | Colonial Revival, Georgian Revival | Babb, Cook & Willard | New York City | Today, houses the Cooper-Hewitt, Smithsonian Design Museum | |
| more images | Joseph Raphael De Lamar House | 1902 | Beaux-Arts | C. P. H. Gilbert | New York City | Purchased by the Republic of Poland in 1973 to house its Consulate General | |
| | Tryon Hall | 1903 | Beaux-Arts | Buchman & Fox | New York City | Built for C.K.G. Billings on the highest point on Manhattan, was destroyed by fire in 1926. | |
| more images | James A. Burden House | 1905 | Italian Renaissance | Warren & Wetmore | New York City | Today, it houses the lower school of the Convent of the Sacred Heart | |
| | Howard C. and Irving Brokaw Houses | 1905 | French Gothic | Rose and Stone | New York City | Built for Howard C Brokaw and Irving Brokaw. Was demolished circa 1965 | |
| more images | Morton F. Plant House | 1905 | Neo-Renaissance | Robert W. Gibson; Thierry W. Despont (renovations) | New York City | Today, a Cartier store | |
| more images | Felix M. Warburg House | 1906 | Châteauesque | C. P. H. Gilbert | New York City | Today, home to the Jewish Museum | |
| more images | Charles M. Schwab House | 1906 | Beaux-Arts | Maurice Hébert | New York City | Demolished in 1947 | |
| more images | George J. Gould House | 1906 | French | Horace Trumbauer | New York City | Replaced by an office building in 1963 | |
| more images | Mrs. O. H. P. Belmont House | 1909 | Neoclassical | Hunt & Hunt | New York City | Demolished in 1951. | |
| | Paterno Castle | 1909 | Medieval | John C Watson | New York City | Was Built for Charles V Paterno and demolished in 1938. | |
| more images | William A. Clark House | 1911 | Beaux-Arts Châteauesque | Austin W. Lord, J. Monroe Hewlett, Washington Hull | New York City | Demolished in 1927. | |
| | John D Rockefeller Jr House | 1912 | Renaissance Revival | William Wells Bosworth | New York City | Built for John D Rockefeller Jr. Was demolished in 1938 | |
| more images | Henry Clay Frick House | 1914 | Beaux-Arts | Carrère and Hastings | New York City | Today, home to the Frick Collection | |
| | A.C James Mansion | 1914 | Beaux-Arts | Allen & Collens | New York City | Was built for Arthur Curtiss James and demolished in 1941. | |
| more images | Willard D. Straight House | 1915 | Georgian Revival | Delano & Aldrich | New York City | Today, private residence of Bruce Kovner | |
| more images | Otto H. Kahn House | 1918 | Italian Renaissance | J. Armstrong Stenhouse, C. P. H. Gilbert | New York City | Modeled after the Palazzo della Cancelleria in Rome | |

== North Carolina ==
| Image | Name | Year built | Style | Architect | City | Notes | Ref. |
|---|---|---|---|---|---|---|---|
| | Körner's Folly | 1880 | Ecentric | Jule Korner | Kernersville | Built for Jule Korner as a German style home and is now a house museum. | |
| more images | Biltmore | 1895 | Châteauesque | Richard Morris Hunt; Frederick Law Olmsted (landscape) | Asheville | Built for George Washington Vanderbilt II, it is the largest house in the U.S. | |
| | Alexander Martin Smith House, | 1897 | Queen Anne | George Franklin Barber | Elkin | Today, a private residence | |
| | Richard Joshua Reynolds House | 1900 | Queen Anne | George Franklin Barber | Winston-Salem | Demolished in 1940s | |
| | Whalehead Club, | 1925 | Art Nouveau | Edward Collings Jr. and Marie Louise Label Knight | Corolla | Today, a historic home for the public | |

== Ohio ==
| Image | Name | Year built | Style | Architect | City | Notes | Ref. |
|---|---|---|---|---|---|---|---|
| | Probasco House | 1859 | Romansque Revival and Gothic | William Tinsley | Cincinnati | Built for Henry Probasco, today is a private residence | |
| | Forest Hill | 1878 | Second Empire and Stick Victorian | | Cleveland | Built for John D Rockefeller, was destroyed by fire in 1917. | |
| | Charles H Bigelow House | 1888 | Queen Anne | Henry Oswald Wurmser | Findlay | | |
| | Sylvester T. Everett House | 1885 | Richardsonian Romanesque | Charles Frederick Schweinfurth | Cleveland | Demolished in 1938 | |
| | Samuel Andrews House | 1885 | Romanesque | George H. Smith | Cleveland | Demolished in 1923 | |
| | Charles F Brush House | 1884 | Romanesque | George H Smith | Cleveland | Demolished in 1930 | |
| | Samuel Mather House | 1910 | English Revival | Charles Frederick Schweinfurth | Cleveland | Today de University Hall of Cleveland | |
| | Taft House | 1820 | Greek Revival, Federal | James Hoban (disputed); Alfred Oscar Elzner (additions) | Cincinnati | Today houses the Taft Museum of Art | |
| | Scarlet Oaks | 1867 | Romanesque Revival, Gothic Revival | James Keys Wilson | Cincinnati | Currently, a retirement home affiliated with the Deaconess Hospital | |
| | George B. Cox House | 1894 | Italianate | Samuel Hannaford | Cincinnati | Currently, a branch of the Public Library of Cincinnati | |
| more images | Old Governor's Mansion | 1904 | Colonial Revival, Neo-Georgian eclectic | Frank Packard | Columbus | Today, home to the Columbus Foundation | |
| more images | Laurel Court | 1907 | Beaux Arts, Renaissance | James Gamble Rogers | Cincinnati | Historic house museum and private residence | |
| more images | Stan Hywet Hall | 1915 | Tudor Revival | Schneider, Charles S.; Manning, Warren H. | Akron | Built by Frank Seiberling | |
| more images | Pinecroft | 1928 | Tudor Revival | Dwight James Baum | Cincinnati | Built for Powel Crosley Jr. | |

== North Dakota ==
| Image | Name | Year built | Style | Architect | City | Notes | Ref. |
|---|---|---|---|---|---|---|---|
| | J. Nelson Kelly House | 1897 | Colonial Revival & Queen Anne | Barber, George F. & Co.; Turner, A. F. | Grand Forks | Built from a catalog and now a Bed & Breakfast | |
| | Harriet and Thomas Beare House | 1901 | Classical Revival, Queen Anne | Lawson, Thomas L. | Grand Forks | Built for Thomas Beare and later owned by the Mayor of Grand Forks. | |
| | Oxford House | 1902 | Colonial Revival | Joseph Bell DeRemer | Grand Forks | Built for the Oxford family and now owned by the University of North Dakota | |
| | Andrew Carr House | 1903 | Classical Revival | Zimmerman, William | Minot | Built for Dr. Andrew Carr and now a Bed and Breakfast. | |
| | Coghlan Castle | 1906-1909 | Richardsonian Romanesque | | St. John | Built for Maurice Coghlan and his family until 1948. Recently in endangered condition. | |
| | Dr. Albert M. and Evelyn M. Brandt House | 1928 | Tudor Revival | Don A. McLaren & Albert O. Larson | Bismarck | Built for Dr. Albert M. Brandt and built by Nils H. Lovin | |

== Oregon ==
| Image | Name | Year built | Style | Architect | City | Notes | Ref. |
|---|---|---|---|---|---|---|---|
| | Captain George Flavel House | 1885 | Queen Anne | Carl W. Leick | Astoria | Today a museum | |
| | Richard B. Knapp House | 1882 | Queen Anne | Warren Heywood Williams | Portland | Demolished in 1951 | |
| | Charles Mortimer Forbes Residence | 1892 | Queen Anne | William R. Stokes | Portland | Demolished in 1929 | |
| | Pittock Mansion | 1914 | Chateauesque | Edward T. Foulkes | Portland | Abandoned in 1958; Opened as a museum in 1965 | |
| | Bitar Mansion | 1927 | Byzantine-Romanesque & Mediterranean Revival | Herman Brookman | Portland | Built for Harry A. Green and purchased by Robert Bitar in 1951. | |

== Pennsylvania ==
| Image | Name | Year built | Style | Architect | City | Notes | Ref. |
|---|---|---|---|---|---|---|---|
| more images | Cairnwood | 1895 | Beaux-Arts | Carrère and Hastings | Bryn Athyn | Owned by the Academy of the New Church | |
| | Melmar | 1910 | Classical Revival | William Cresson Prichett, Jr | Huntingdon Valley | Built for J.B. Lippincott and Joanna Wharton, daughter of Joseph Wharton | |
| | Ogontz | 1867 | Second Empire | | Elkins Park | Built for Jay Cooke, was demolished in 1924 for the construction of another mansion. | |
| more images | Lynnewood Hall | 1900 | Neoclassical Revival | Horace Trumbauer | Elkins Park | Predominantly vacant since 1952 | |
| more images | Elstowe Manor | 1898 | Italian Renaissance | Horace Trumbauer | Elkins Park | | |
| more images | Grey Towers | 1896 | Gothic Revival | Horace Trumbauer | Glenside | Today, part of Arcadia University | |
| | Lindenhurst | 1883 | Romanesque | Edward Alfred Sargent | Jenkintown | Built for John Wanamaker, was destroyed by fire in 1907. | |
| | Sinnott Mansion | 1891 | Châteauesque | Samuel Huckel Jr. | Lower Merion | Built for Joseph F Sinnott | |
| | Woodmont | 1894 | Châteauesque | William Lightfoot Price | Gladwyne | Built for Alan Wood Jr., later the residence of evangelist Father Divine, and the center of his International Peace Mission movement. Today is open for tours. | |
| | Scott Mansion | 1875 | Victorian | Frank Furness | Philadelphia | Built for Thomas A Scott, was demolished in 1913 | |
| | Harrison Mansion | 1857 | Neoclassical, Italianate | Samuel Sloan | Philadelphia | Built for Joseph Harrison Jr, was demolished in 1925 | |
| | Disston Mansion | 1882 | Italianate | Edwin Forrest Durang | Philadelphia | Built for Albert H Disston, son of Henry Disston. Today the house is the Unity Mission Church Home Training School Bible Institute. | |
| | Townsend Castle | 1887 | Romanesque | GW & WD Hewitt | Philadelphia | Built for John Lister Townsend, today is a private residence. | |
| more images | Clayton | 1860s (renovated 1892) | Italianate | Andrew Peebles (renovations); Frederick J. Osterling (renovations) | Pittsburgh | Part of The Frick Pittsburgh | |
| | Frank H. Buhl Mansion | 1891 | Châteauesque and Romanesque | Charles Henry Owsley | Sharon | Built for Frank H. Buhl, today is a house museum. | |
| more images | Negley–Gwinner–Harter House | 1871 | Second Empire | Frederick J. Osterling (renovations) | Pittsburgh | | |
| more images | Baywood Mansion | 1880 | Second Empire | | Pittsburgh | | |
| | Schwab-Dixon Mansion | 1888 | Richardsonian Romanesque | Frederick J. Osterling | North Braddock | Built for Charles M. Schwab | |
| more images | McCook Mansion | 1906 | Jacobean Revival | Carpenter & Crocker | Pittsburgh | A boutique hotel and member of Historic Hotels of America | |
| | Walmarthon | 1913 | Mediterranean Revival | David Knickerbacker Lloyd | St. Davids | Built for Charles S Walton, today is part of the Eastern University | |
| more images | Moreland-Hoffstot House | 1914 | French Renaissance Revival | Irwin, Paul | Pittsburgh | | |
| | Weigley Mansion | 1876-1882 | Second Empire | Isaac H. Hobbs | Schaefferstown | Built for William Weigley | |
| | Whitemarsh Hall | 1921 | Georgian | Horace Trumbauer | Wyndmoor | (demolished 1980) | |
| | Widener Mansion | 1887 | Châteauesque | Willis G Hale | Philadelphia | Destroyed by fire in 1980 | |

== Rhode Island ==
| Image | Name | Year built | Style | Architect | City | Notes | Ref. |
|---|---|---|---|---|---|---|---|
| more images | Kingscote | 1839 (remodeled 1870s, remodeled 1880s) | Gothic Revival | Richard Upjohn; George C. Mason (1870s renovation); McKim, Mead and White (1880s renovation) | Newport | One of the first summer "cottages" constructed in Newport; owned by the Preservation Society of Newport County and open for tours | |
| more images | Malbone Castle | 1849 (remodeled 1875) | Gothic Revival | Alexander Jackson Davis; Dudley Newton (renovations) | Newport | A private residence not open to the public | |
| more images | Beechwood | 1851 | Italianate | Downing and Vaux (construction); Richard Morris Hunt (renovations); McKim, Mead & White (renovations) | Newport | Originally built for Daniel Parish, was bought and renovated by William B Astor and Caroline Astor in 1880. Owned by Larry Ellison since 2010 who is creating the "Beechwood Art Museum" | |
| more images | Chateau-sur-Mer | 1852 | Second Empire | Seth C. Bradford (construction); Richard Morris Hunt (renovations); Ogden Codman Jr. (design) | Newport | Built for William Shepard Wetmore, was extensively remodeled in 1870s, Today is a museum. | |
| | The Reefs | 1853 | Italianate | | Newport | Built for Christopher Wolfe and later buy and remodeled by Harry Payne Whitney and Gertrude Vanderbilt Whitney. Was destroyed by fire in 1942. | |
| | Beaulieu | 1859 | Second Empire | Downing and Vaux | Newport | Originally built for Federico Luciano Barreda, it was later inhabited by John Jacob Astor III and Cornelius Vanderbilt III, it was remodeled in the 1950s and is currently a private home. | |
| | Chepstow | 1860 | Italianate | George Champlin Mason Sr. | Newport | Built for Edmund Schermerhorn. Now a museum | |
| | By The Sea | 1860 | Italianate | George Chaplain Mason Sr | Newport | Built for Caroline Perry Belmont and August Belmont. Was demolished in 1946. | |
| | The Rocks | 1864 | Stick and Romanesque | John Hubbard Sturgis | Newport | Originally built for Edward Darley Boit, it was later bought and remodeled by Henry Claws. Was demolished in 1945. | |
| | William King Covell III House | 1870 | | | Newport | Built for Milton H. Sanford, later owned by William King Covell III, summer residence of Lizzie Borden, now a bed and breakfast | |
| | Eisenhower House | 1873 | Victorian | George C. Mason & Son | Newport | Built for General Henry Jackson Hunt, later served as Dwight D. Eisenhower's summer residence. | |
| more images | Fairholme | 1874–1875 | Tudor | Frank Furness | Newport | Built for Fairman Rogers, remodeled in 1905 for John R. Drexel. Today a private residence. | |
| more images | William Watts Sherman House | 1875 | Queen Anne | H. H. Richardson; Stanford White (c. 1880 renovations) | Newport | Owned by Salve Regina University | |
| more images | Charles H. Baldwin House | 1877 | Queen Anne Shingle | Potter & Robinson | Newport | Built for U.S. Navy Admiral Charles H. Baldwin | |
| more images | The Breakers | 1878 | Queen Anne | Peabody and Stearns | Newport | Destroyed by fire in 1892 and replaced by The Breakers | |
| more images | Vinland Estate | 1882 | Romanesque Revival | Peabody & Stearns | Newport | Today, McAuley Hall, Salve Regina University | |
| | Graystone | 1883 | Romanesque | George Chaplain Mason & Company | Newport | Demolished in 1938 | |
| | Aspen Hall/Rockhurst | 1884 | Queen Anne | Peabody & Stearns | Newport | Built for H.L Mortimer Brooks. Was demolished in 1955. | |
| | The Cloisters | 1885 | Shingle | JD Johnston | Newport | Built for Catherine Lorillard Kernochan. Later bought by James T Woodward. Demolished in 1950 | |
| | Stoneacre | 1885 | Shingle | William A Potter | Newport | Built for John W. Ellis; demolished in 1962 | |
| | Isaac Bell House | 1881–1883 | Shingle Style | McKim, Mead, and White | Newport | Built for Isaac Bell Jr. | |
| more images | Seaview Terrace | 1885 (remodeled c. 1923) | Châteauesque | Howard Greenley | Newport | Privately owned and is not open for tours | |
| more images | William G. Low House | 1887 | Shingle | McKim, Mead & White | Bristol | Demolished in 1962. | |
| more images | Hammersmith Farm | 1887 | Victorian Shingle | R. H. Robertson; Olmsted Brothers (landscape) | Newport | Built for John W. Auchincloss, uncle of Hugh D. Auchincloss (Jacqueline Kennedy's stepfather) | |
| | Althorpe | 1889–1890 | Colonial Revival | Peabody & Stearns | Newport | Built for John Thompson Spencer | |
| more images | Rockhurst (also known as Aspen Hall) | 1891 | Châteauesque | Peabody & Stearns | Newport | Demolished in 1955 for a residential subdivision | |
| more images | Ochre Court | 1892 | Châteauesque | Richard Morris Hunt | Newport | Owned by Salve Regina University | |
| more images | Marble House | 1892 | Beaux-Arts | Richard Morris Hunt | Newport | Open to the public and run by the Preservation Society of Newport County | |
| more images | Rough Point | 1892 | English Manorial | Peabody & Stearns | Newport | Built for Frederick William Vanderbilt; Owned and operated by the Newport Restoration Foundation | |
| more images | Belcourt | 1894 | Châteauesque | Richard Morris Hunt (1894); John Russell Pope (1910) | Newport | | |
| more images | The Breakers | 1895 | Neo Italian Renaissance | Richard Morris Hunt | Newport | Built for Cornelius Vanderbilt II, replaced the 1878 Breakers mansion (owned by Pierre Lorillard IV) | |
| more images | Crossways | 1895 | Colonial Revival | Dudley Newton | Newport | | |
| | President's House | 1896 | Colonial Revival | Creighton Withers | Newport | Built by the Naval War College for Rear Admiral French Ensor Chadwick, | |
| | Lippitt Castle | 1899 | Medieval Castle | Robert H Robertson | Newport | Built for Charles Warren Lippitt. Was demolished in 1924. | |
| more images | Vernon Court | 1901 | French classical | Carrère and Hastings | Newport | Today, home of the National Museum of American Illustration. | |
| more images | The Elms | 1901 | Classical Revival | Horace Trumbauer | Newport | Open to the public and run by the Preservation Society of Newport County | |
| more images | Rosecliff | 1902 | French Baroque Revival | McKim, Mead & White | Newport | Open to the public and run by the Preservation Society of Newport County | |
| | Castlewood | 1905 | | Edward Payson Whitman | Newport | Built for Josephine S Bruguière, was demolished in 1942. | |
| | Beacon Hill | 1911 | English Revival | Howells & Stokes | Newport | Built for Arthur Curtiss James, was demolished in 1967. | |
| more images | Miramar | 1915 | French neoclassical | Horace Trumbauer | Newport | Built for Eleanor Widener. The gardens was designed by landscape architect Jacques Gréber | |
| | Belton Court | 1905 | Medieval Revival | Martin & Hall | Barrington | Built for Frederick Stanhope Peck. Since 2011, Belton Court and the surrounding structures have been predominately vacant. | |
| more images | Bois Doré | 1927 | French Château | Charles A. Platt | Newport | Later owned by heiress Carolyn Mary Skelly | |

== South Carolina ==
| Image | Name | Year built | Style | Architect | City | Notes | Ref. |
|---|---|---|---|---|---|---|---|
| | Wilkins House | 1876 | Italianate | | Greenville | Built for William T. Wilkins and once considered the finest in America. Later became a funeral home and recently relocated. | |
| more images | Calhoun Mansion | 1876 | Italianate | George W. Williams | Charleston | Open for public tours | |
| | Wentworth | 1886 | Second Empire | Daniel G. Wayne | Charleston | Built for Francis Silas Rodgers. In 1920, it became owned by Scottish Rite Cathedral Association of Charleston and later converted into a hotel. | |
| | Atalaya | 1931 | Moorish & Meditteranean Revival | Archer Milton Huntington; William Thompson | Murrells Inlet | Built for Archer M. Huntington and occupied by the U.S. Army Corps in WW2. Now part of a state park. | |
| | Boone Hall | 1936 | Colonial Revival | William Harmon Beers | Mount Pleasant | Replaced an earlier plantation house and presently a museum. | |

== Tennessee ==
| Image | Name | Year built | Style | Architect | City | Notes | Ref. |
|---|---|---|---|---|---|---|---|
| | Hill Mansion | 1881 | French Renaissance | | Memphis | Built by businessman and newspaper owner Napoleon Hill. Demolished in 1928 to make way for the Sterick Building. | |
| | Hallehurst | 1883 | Colonial Revival | | Pulaski | Built for Newton Harris White and extended in 1920 from plans by Abe Mcissack. | |
| | Ashlar Hall | 1896 | Castle | R.B. Snowden | Memphis | Constructed by and for Robert Brinkley Snowden as a mock castle. In recent years, it has been a restaurant, nightclub, and is presently an event venue. | |
| | Gilbert Mansion | 1908 | Four Square | Joseph Lightman | Nashville | Constructed for Hungarian immigrant Joseph Lightman who founded what would become the Belcourt Theater. Later purchased by Harris Gilbert and now law offices. | |
| | Cheekwood | 1929 | Colonial Revival | Bryant Fleming | Nashville | Constructed for Leslie Cheek on large property with gardens. In 1960, it was donated by relatives to become a museum. | |

== Texas ==
| Image | Name | Year built | Style | Architect | City | Notes | Ref. |
|---|---|---|---|---|---|---|---|
| | John H. Hounghton House | 1887 | Queen Anne | James Wahrenberger | Austin | Demolished in 1973 | |
| | George Littlefield House | 1893 | Queen Anne | James Wahrenberger | Austin | Today, part of the campus of the University of Texas at Austin | |
| | John Bremond House | 1886 | Second Empire | James Wahrenberger | Austin | Part of Texas Classroom Teachers Association | |
| | Bishop's Palace | 1893 | Richardson Romanesque | Nicholas J Clayton | Galveston | Built for Walter Gresham, today is open for tours. | |
| | Edward Steves Jr. House | 1884 | Italianante | James Wahrenberger | San Antonio | Built for ammunition magnate and lumber heir Edward Steves Jr. as a new home for him and his new wife; remained a private home. | |
| | Charles F. A. Hummel House | 1884 | Italianante | James Wahrenberger & Albert Beckman | San Antonio | Built for sporting goods merchant and gunsmith Charles Hummel; remained a private home. | |

== Utah ==
| Image | Name | Year built | Style | Architect | City | Notes | Ref. |
|---|---|---|---|---|---|---|---|
| | Gardo House | 1883 | Second Empire | William H. Folsom and Joseph Ridges | Salt Lake City | Gardo House was the official residence of the president of the Church of Jesus Christ of Latter-day Saints (LDS Church) during the terms of John Taylor and Wilford Woodruff. Was demolished on November 26, 1921. | |
| | Albert Fisher Mansion | 1893 | Late Victorian& Eclectic | Kletting, Richard K.A | Salt Lake City | Built by Richard K.A. Kletting for Albert Fisher and, since 2008, it has ran as a museum. | |
| | Hines Mansion | 1895 | Victorian | Either Richard K.A. Kletting or Richard C. Watkins | Provo | Built for R. Spencer and Kitty Hines. The two left the home in 1906 and it is now a Bed & Breakfast. | |
| | Alfred McCune House | 1900 | Gothic Revival | S.C. Dallas | Salt Lake City | Designed for and based off of ideas by Afred McCune to peer over the hills of Salt Lake City. Occupied by McCune until 1920 when it was given to the Church of Jesus Christ of Latter Day Saints, who operated it as a music school for many years. Presently a home again. | |
| | Thomas R. Cutler Mansion | 1900 | Colonial Revival | Walter Ware (likely) | Lehi | One of few Colonial Revival homes in Utah, and considered the last to remain in a small town. | |

== Vermont ==
| Image | Name | Year built | Style | Architect | City | Notes | Ref. |
|---|---|---|---|---|---|---|---|
| | Wilson Castle | 1885 | Scottish baronial, Queen Anne, and Romanesque Revival | William Pitt Wentworth | Proctor | Built for John Johnson, today is a museum. | |
| | Mari-Castle | 1886 | Queene Anne & Chateauesque | | Randolph | Built for Albert Brown Chandler and later used as office space. Now a private residence again. | |
| | Shelburne Farms | 1899 | Queen Anne | R. H. Robertson and Frederick Law Olmsted | Shelburne | Today is a nonprofit education center for sustainability | |
| | Juniper Hill Farm | 1902 | Colonial Revival | Evarts, Maxwell; Ayers, Harvey | Windsor | Built by and for Maxwell Evarts. Occupied by his family until 1944. Since, it has been used as a Restaurant, Inn, and Nursing Home. | |
| | Hildene Mansion | 1905 | Georgian Revival | Shepley, Rutan & Coolidge | Manchester | Former summer home of Robert Todd Lincoln, today is a museum | |

== Virginia ==
| Image | Name | Year built | Style | Architect | City | Notes | Ref. |
|---|---|---|---|---|---|---|---|
| more images | Ellerslie | 1856 (extensively remodeled in 1910) | Italian Villa | Robert Young (1857); Carneal and Johnston (1910) | Colonial Heights | | |
| more images | Roseland Manor (also known as the Strawberry Banks Manor House) | 1887 | Châteauesque Queen Anne | Arthur Crooks | Hampton | Destroyed by fire in 1985 | |
| more images | Maymont | 1893 | Victorian | Edgerton S. Rogers | Richmond | Today, a historic house museum and arboretum | |
| more images | Poplar Hill (also known as the Dunnington Mansion) | 1897 | Victorian | | Farmville | 8,500 sq. ft. Manor home of tobacco baron Walter Grey Dunnington that has fallen into disrepair | |
| more images | Berryman Mansion | 1900 | Colonial Revival | | Smithfield | Built by P.D. Gwaltney as a wedding gift for his daughter who married F.R. Berryman. | |
| more images | P. D. Gwaltney Jr. House | 1901 | Queen Anne | George Franklin Barber | Smithfield | Remained in the Gwaltney family until 2016. | |
| more images | Cedar Hall | 1906 (demolished 1976) | Queen Anne | Vance & Allen | Hampton | Demolished in 1976. | |
| more images | Swannanoa | 1912 | Italian Renaissance Revival | Noland & Baskerville | Nelson County | | |
| more images | Branch House | 1916 | Tudor Revival, Jacobean Revival | John Russell Pope with Otto R. Eggers | Richmond | Offices of the Virginia Society of the American Institute of Architects (VSAIA) and the Branch Museum of Architecture and Design. | |
| more images | Westbourne | 1919 | Georgian Revival | W. Duncan Lee | Richmond | Gardens designed by landscape architect Charles F. Gillette | |
| more images | Merrywood | 1919 | Georgian Revival | | McLean | Childhood home of Jacqueline Kennedy Onassis; Gardens designed by landscape architect Beatrix Farrand | |
| more images | Selma (Leesburg, Virginia) | 1902 | Colonial Revival | Noland and Baskerville | Leesburg | Built by Elijah B. White a wealthy Virginia banker who at the time was the largest exporter of grain in the United States. | |
| | Lewis Ginter House | 1892 | Romanesque | Harvey L Page and William W Kent | Richmond | Today part of Virginia Commonwealth University | |

== Washington ==
| Image | Name | Year built | Style | Architect | City | Notes | Ref. |
|---|---|---|---|---|---|---|---|
| | Ward House | 1882 | Italian Villa | George W. Ward | Seattle | Constructed by and for George W. Ward, a carpenter. Later turned into a Boarding House and moved in 1986 to a safer location. | |
| | Ezra Meeker Mansion | 1887 | Italianate | Farrell & Darmer | Puyallup | Today a museum | |
| | Patsy Clark Mansion | 1897 | Spanish & Moorish | Kirtland Cutter | Spokane | Built in 1897 for mining millionaire Patsy Clark. Later used as a restaurant and now a law firm with event space. | |
| | L. M. Wood House | 1901 | Italianate | | Seattle | Built for merchant Lovett Mortimer Wood, demolished by Wood's widow in the 1920s | |
| | Ashford Mansion | 1903 | Colonial Revival | Cora Ashford | Ashford | Designed by and for Cora Ashford. Recently used as a Bed & Breakfast; Presently rented out for events. | |

== Wisconsin ==
| Image | Name | Year built | Style | Architect | City | Notes | Ref. |
|---|---|---|---|---|---|---|---|
| | Pabst Mansion | 1892 | Flemish Renaissance Revival | George Ferry | Milwaukee | Today a historic house museum | |
| | Elizabeth Plankinton House | 1888 | Richardson Romanesque | Edward Townsend Mix | Milwaukee | Demolished in 1980 | |
| | William Plankinton House | 1876 | Second Empire and Victorian | Edward Townsend Mix | Milwaukee | Demolished in 1969 | |
| | John Plankinton House | 1856 | Italianate | | Milwaukee | Originally built for James H Rogers and later buy and remodeled by John Plankinton in 1864. Demolished in 1975. | |
| | Holway Mansion | 1892 | Romanesque and Queen Anne | Hugo Schick and Gustav Stolze | La Crosse | Originally built for N.B. Holway in 1892. Mr. Holway was a Lumber Baron and Local Businessman. The Diocese of La Crosse purchased the residence in 1921 for the Bishop of La Crosse. It later served as a Seminary and finally was being used as a Convent by the late 1950s. The Diocese sold the property in 1974. It currently is run as Castle La Crosse Bed and Breakfast. | |
| | Valentin Blatz House | 1884–1886 | Italianate | | Milwaukee | Demolished for make way for a planned strip mall in 1964. | |

== Wyoming ==
| Image | Name | Year built | Style | Architect | City | Notes | Ref. |
|---|---|---|---|---|---|---|---|
| | Nagle-Warren Mansion | 1888 | Romanesque | | Cheyenne | Built for Erasmus Nagle and later owned by Francis E. Warren. Later owned by the YWCA and now a Bed & Breakfast | |
| | George Ferris Mansion | 1899-1903 | Queene Anne | Barber & Klutz | Rawlins | Built for George and Julia Ferris. Now a Bed & Breakfast. | |
| | Wyoming Historic Governors' Mansion | 1904 | Georgian Colonial Revival | Charles Murdock | Cheyenne | Built for Governor of Wyoming Fenimore Chatterton | |
| | Trail End | 1908-1913 | Flemish Revival | MacAlister, William | Sheridan | Constructed for John B. Kendrick and now a museum. | |
| | Cooper Mansion | 1921 | Mission Revival and Pueblo Revival | Wilbur Hitchcock | Laramie | Built for the Cooper family and now owned by the University of Wyoming. | |

== See also ==
- American architecture
- List of largest houses in the United States
