= William J. Ryan Estate =

Historic house in New York, United States

- U.S. National Register of Historic Places
- U.S. Historic district
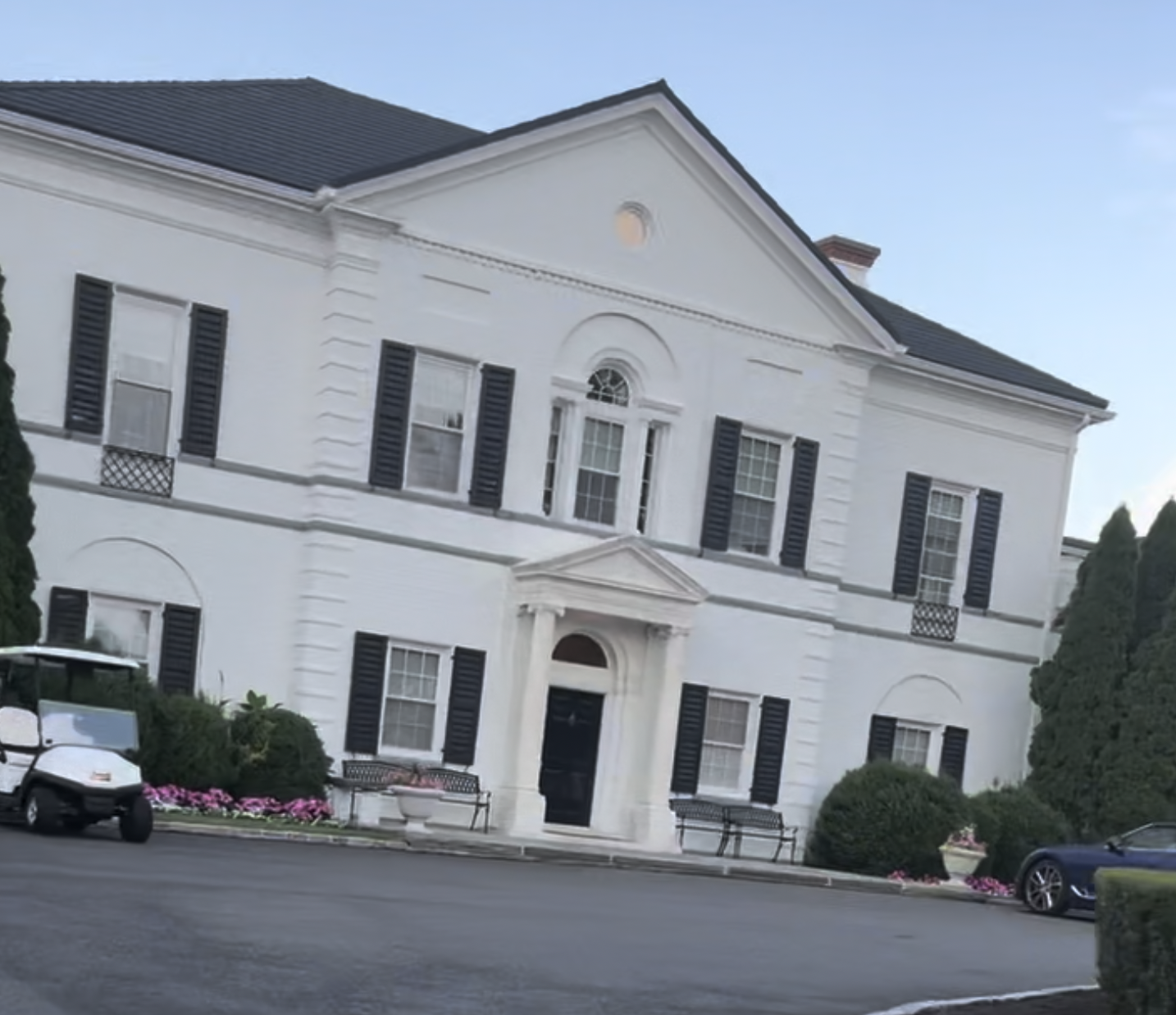
- The Ryan Estate as pictured in 2022.

- Location within New York Location within the United States
- Location: Moriches Rd., Nissequogue, New York
- Coordinates: 40°54′7″N 73°11′20″W
- Area: 126 acres (51 ha)
- Built: 1930
- Architect: Delehanty, Bradley
- Architectural style: Late 19th And 20th Century Revivals
- MPS: Stony Brook Harbor Estates MPS
- NRHP reference No.: 93000706
- Added to NRHP: August 9, 1993

William J. Ryan Estate, now Nissequogue Golf Club, is a national historic district located at Nissequogue in Suffolk County, New York. The district includes the principal dwelling, now the club house designed by Bradley Delehanty. The estate house, known as "Yarrow," was built in 1930 and is a two-story, brick structure with a five bay center block connected to perpendicular wings by hyphens. The entrance features a three bay projecting center section that rises to a pedimented roof gable; at the ridge is a circular attic window.

It was added to the National Register of Historic Places in 1993.
