= Coghlan Castle =

Historic house in North Dakota, United States

- U.S. National Register of Historic Places
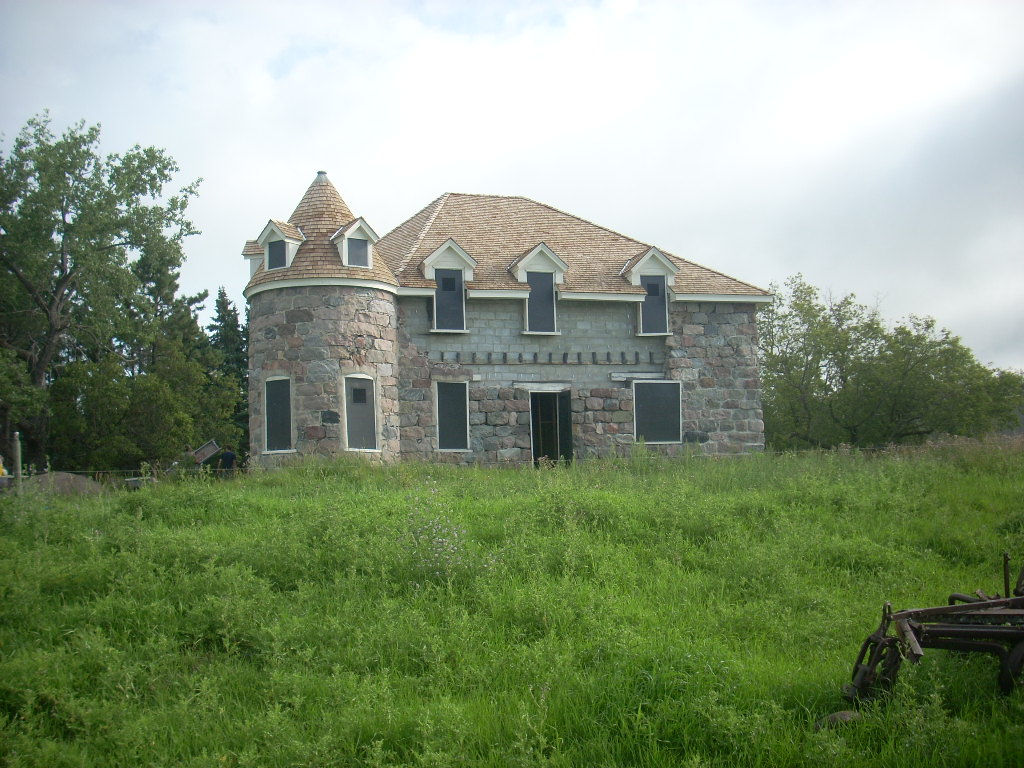
- South Elevation showing reconstruction work of partially collapsed wall.

- Location within North Dakota Location within the United States
- Location: Lot 2, SW 1/4 of the NW 1/4 T163N R69W Section 19, vicinity of St. John, North Dakota
- Coordinates: 48°55′49″N 99°39′18″W
- Built: 1906-1909
- Architectural style: Richardsonian Romanesque
- NRHP reference No.: 08000681
- Added to NRHP: July 16, 2008

Coghlan Castle is a building in Rolette County, North Dakota, near St. John, North Dakota. Occupied by Maurice Coghlan and his family until 1948, it is the only castle in North Dakota. The property remained relatively unknown until it was listed on the National Register of Historic Places on July 16, 2008, and is the third property to be listed as featured property of the week. It is of stone construction.
