= Brougher Mansion =

Historic house in Nevada, United States

- U.S. National Register of Historic Places
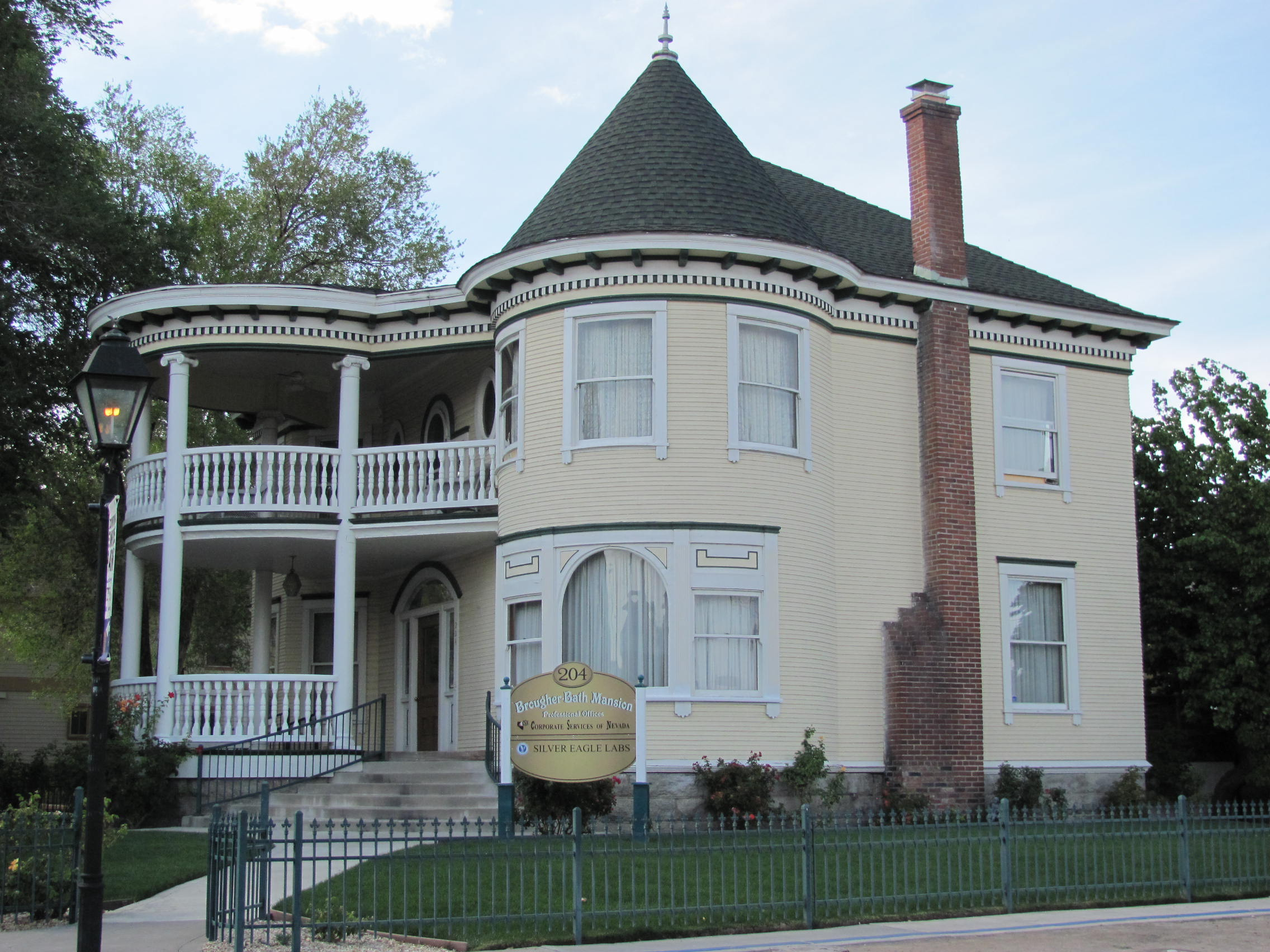

- Location within Nevada Location within the United States
- Location: 204 W. Spear St., Carson City, Nevada
- Coordinates: 39°10′0″N 119°46′22″W
- Built: 1904
- Architect: Heidenreich, Henry
- Architectural style: Queen Anne
- NRHP reference No.: 80004274
- Added to NRHP: August 11, 1980

The Brougher Mansion, at 204 W. Spear St. in Carson City, Nevada, is a historic Queen Anne-style house that was built in 1903–1904. Also known as the Bath Mansion, it was listed on the National Register of Historic Places in 1904.

It was deemed significant for its architecture, as the only example of its style in Carson City, and for its association with Wilson Brougher, "a man of great enterprise" who rose from poverty to riches.
