= Harriet and Thomas Beare House =

Historic house in North Dakota, United States

- U.S. National Register of Historic Places
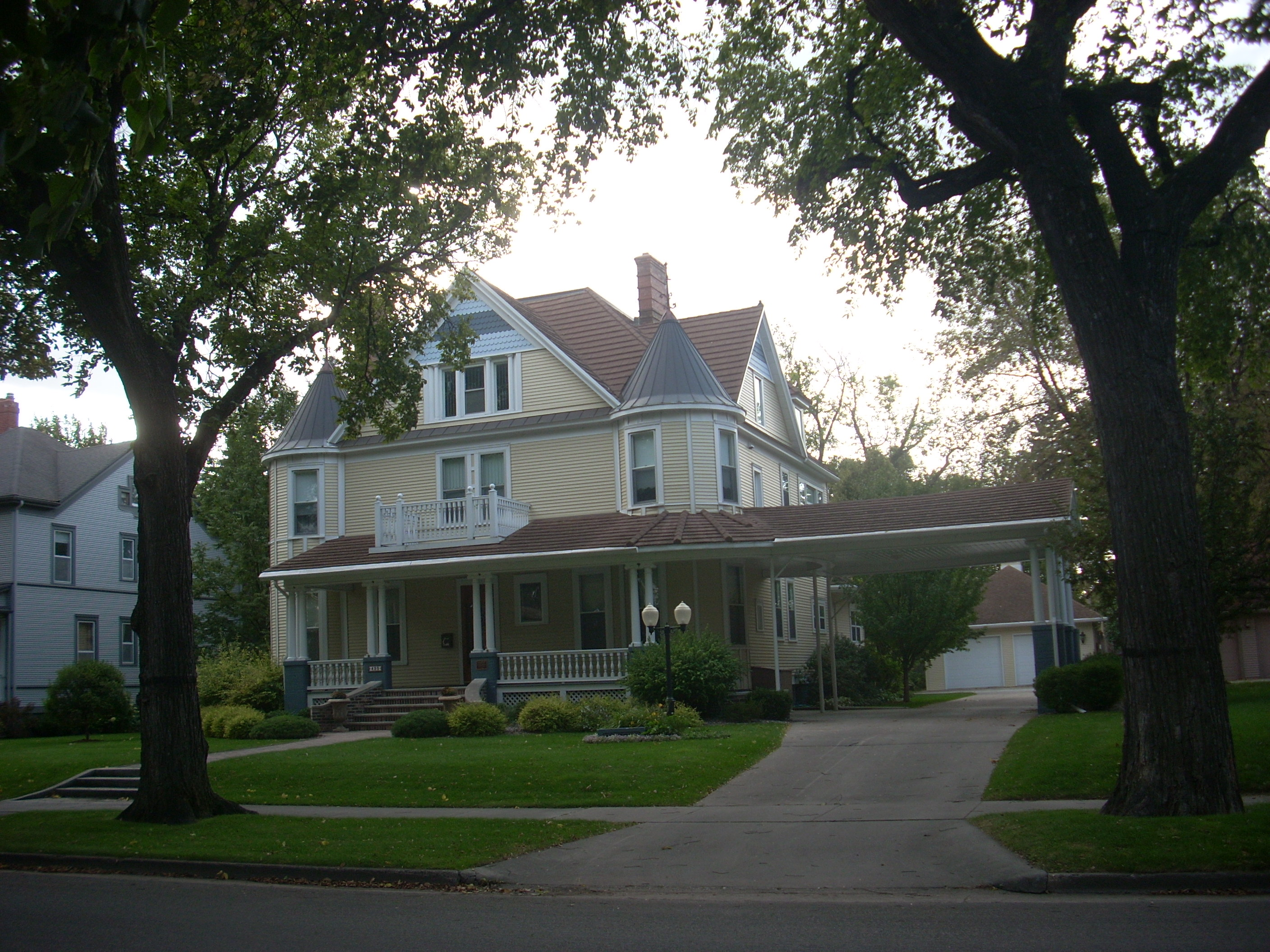

- Location within North Dakota Location within the United States
- Location: 420 Reeves Dr., Grand Forks, North Dakota
- Coordinates: 47°55′4″N 97°1′36″W
- Area: less than one acre
- Built: 1901
- Architect: Lawson, Thomas L.
- Architectural style: Classical Revival, Queen Anne
- NRHP reference No.: 95000469
- Added to NRHP: April 20, 1995

The Harriet and Thomas Beare House is a Victorian house located on Reeves Drive in the Near Southside Historic District of Grand Forks, North Dakota. The Harriet and Thomas Beare House was added to the National Register of Historic Places in 1995. It is also known as the Margaret E. Bowler Murphy and Michael F. Murphy House.

== History ==
The house was built in 1901 for real estate investor Thomas Beare. In 1903, he sold the home to state senator and Grand Forks Mayor Michael F. Murphy (1858-1930) and his wife Margaret Bowler Murphy (1857–1917). They enlarged and remodeled the residence, building an addition for their family. The house was located on the most prestigious residential street in Grand Forks, and exemplifies the conspicuous consumption of the cities' elite during the Progressive Era and the growth of the Second Dakota Boom (1889-1915).

The house is a significant example of the Queen Anne style with elements taken from the Classical Revival style. Queen Anne details include decorative chimneys, complexity of roof shapes such as conical turrets and hipped roof dormers, finials, and fish-scale shingled gable ends. The house is a relatively simple expression of the style and shows signs of transition into the Classical Revival style in its symmetrical facade, Ionic columns, Doric details, and regular footprint. A notable feature is the Porte-cochere which is fairly rare in Grand Forks.
