= Hallehurst =

Historic house in Tennessee, United States

- U.S. National Register of Historic Places
- U.S. Historic district
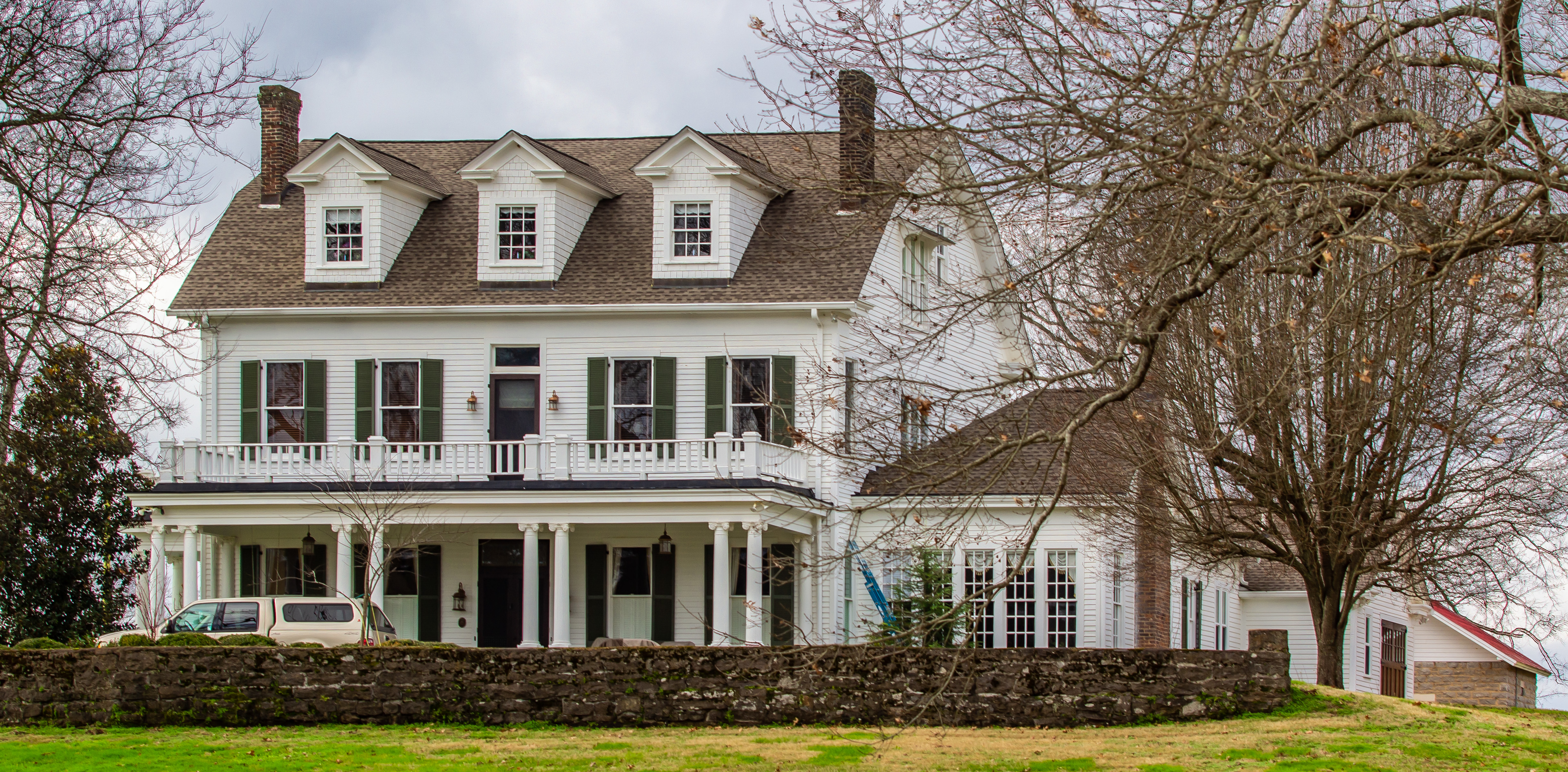

- Location within Tennessee
- Location: 106 Little Dry Creek Rd.
- Nearest city: Pulaski, Tennessee
- Area: 33 acres (13 ha)
- Built: 1920
- Architectural style: Colonial Revival
- NRHP reference No.: 06000799
- Added to NRHP: September 6, 2006

Hallehurst is a historic mansion in Pulaski, Tennessee, U.S.. It was built in 1878 for Newton Harris White, a politician. It has been listed on the National Register of Historic Places since September 6, 2006.
