= Rockhurst (Rhode Island) =

Coordinates: 41.455554°N 71.309278°W

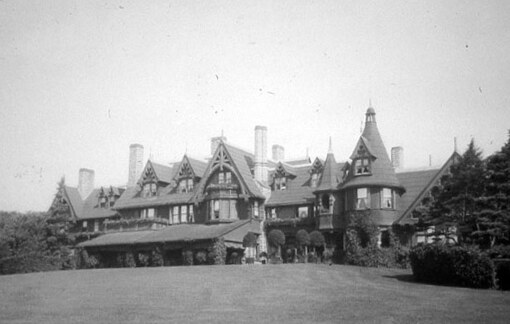
- Interactive map of the Rockhurst area
- Alternative names: Aspen Hall

General information
- Architectural style: Châteauesque
- Location: Rough Point, Bellevue Avenue, Newport, Rhode Island, United States
- Year built: 1891
- Demolished: September 1955

Design and construction
- Architect: Peabody and Stearns

Rockhurst was built on Bellevue Avenue at Rough Point Newport, Rhode Island in 1891 for Mrs. H. Mortimer Brooks by Peabody and Stearns. The Châteauesque style exterior featured rounded towers with candlesnuffer roofs flanking a central block with an open arcaded gallery along the second story. It was made of farm stone and wood shingles.

== History ==
Mrs. Brooks main residence was in New York City and she had an additional summer house on Long Island. The floor plan of Rockhurst included terracing and numerous porches. The style of Rockhurst was influenced by the chateaux of the Loire Valley. In 1920, the estate was sold to the John Aspegrens who renamed the property Aspen Hall. In 1930, the estate was purchased by Mrs. Walter B. James of New York and, in 1944, by Frederick H. Prince, who had purchased the nearby Marble House in 1932. Mr. Prince sold Rockhurst in 1945 to Charles G. West who demolished the main house in September 1955 for a residential subdivision. The gate house, carriage house and gardener’s cottage still remain.
