= St. Mary's By the River =

Historic house in Mississippi, United States

- U.S. National Register of Historic Places
- Location within Mississippi Location within the United States
- Location: 3855 River Rd., Moss Point, Mississippi
- Coordinates: 30°23′47″N 88°33′10″W
- Area: 3 acres (1.2 ha)
- Built: 1929
- Architect: Shepard, Martin
- Architectural style: Late 19th And 20th Century Revivals, Tudor Revival, Other, Mediterranean Revival
- NRHP reference No.: 91000542
- Added to NRHP: May 2, 1991

St. Mary's By the River is a historic building at 3855 River Road in Moss Point, Mississippi.

It was built in 1929 and added to the National Register of Historic Places in 1991.

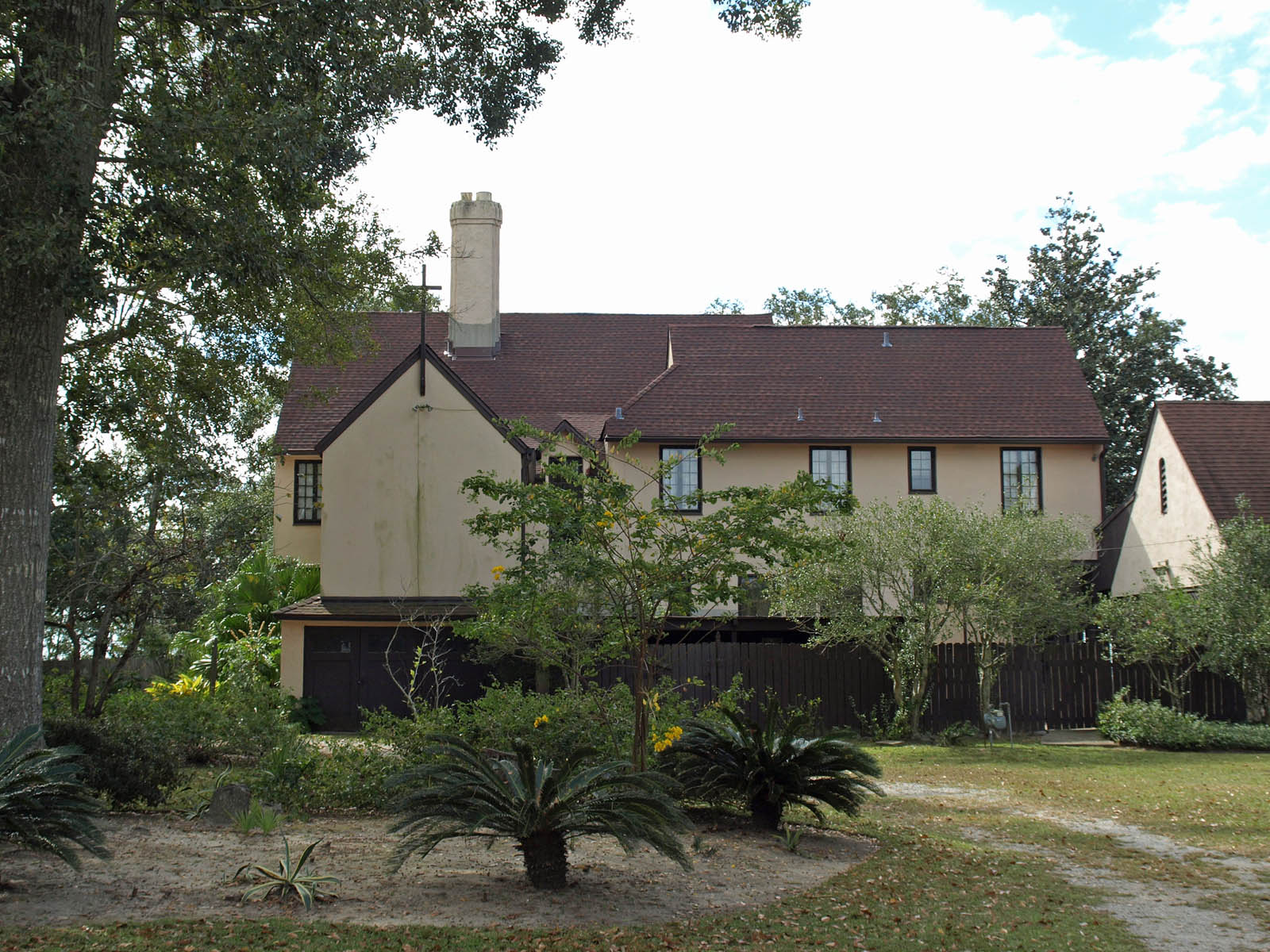
St. Mary's By the River
