= Gilbert Tilles =

American real estate developer

- Born: December 31, 1916
- Died: November 14, 1990 (aged 73)
- Occupation: Real Estate Agent
- Known for: real estate, and development of Long Island
- Notable work: Crossways Industrial Park
- Spouse: Rose Tilles

Gilbert Tilles (December 31, 1916 – November 14, 1990) was an American real estate developer and philanthropist based in Long Island, New York. In the 1950s, he partnered with developer Irving Berger built many shopping centers on Long Island, including the Levittown Shopping Center. In 1961, he founded the Tilles Development Corporation, which built industrial parks in the New York metropolitan area.

Tilles served in several board positions including honorary chairman of the Union of American Hebrew Congregations, vice chairman of Long Island University, and board member of the Long Island Jewish Center.

== Early life and education ==
Tilles graduated from the University of Michigan in 1937.

== Career ==
In 1950, Gilbert Tilles, along with his partner Irving Berger purchased a 100-acre farm that was called Island Trees. Gilbert Tilles would then use this land to build the Levittown Shopping Center, which opened in 1953, becoming the largest pedestrian mall east of the Mississippi at the time it was opened. By 1955, Gilbert Tilles and Irving Berger had 11 shopping centers built.

=== Bridge Plans ===
In the 1960s, as the Long Island Expressway was expanding towards Woodbury, Gilbert Tilles' friend Bill Casey introduced him to state Park Commission President Robert Moses, and U.S. Presidential Advisor Nelson Rockefeller. Together, they discussed a planned bridge between Westchester and Oyster Bay. Seeing an opportunity for office buildings, Gilbert sold all but one shopping mall, in order to purchase Froelich Farm, where the Long Island Expressway and Route 135 would eventually connect. Construction began on the Nassau Crossways Industrial Park, although the bridge was never built.

=== Contributions to the Lunar Module Program ===
When Grumman began working on the Lunar Module Program, for the Apollo Program, Gilbert Tilles would find the opportunity to lease eight buildings to Grumman. He would lease these buildings until 1992, when Grumman left.

== Personal life ==
Gilbert Tilles was married to Rose Tilles and had two children, Peter Tilles and Roger Tilles.

== Legacy ==
=== Tilles Center for the Performing Arts ===
In 1954, Long Island University announced the creation of a college of arts and sciences in Brookville. By 1955, the school was opened and classes started. In 1970, LIU added a 3,500-seat theater to the Brookville Campus, locally known as The Dome. However, on the night of January 21, 1978, The Dome collapsed due to snow accumulation. Following this, a new concert hall was built by Paul Borches and Mitchell Giurgola Architects. This new concert hall was completed in 1981. Due to the donations from the Tilles family, the new concert hall was named the Tilles Center for the Performing Arts.

=== Gilbert Tilles Award ===
The Gilbert Tilles Award is given to a business or individual that exhibits exceptional actions while being a philanthropist. The individual or business also must demonstrate leadership by inspiring others to also become philanthropists.
