= Bishop Manor Estate =

Historic house in Alabama, United States

- U.S. National Register of Historic Places
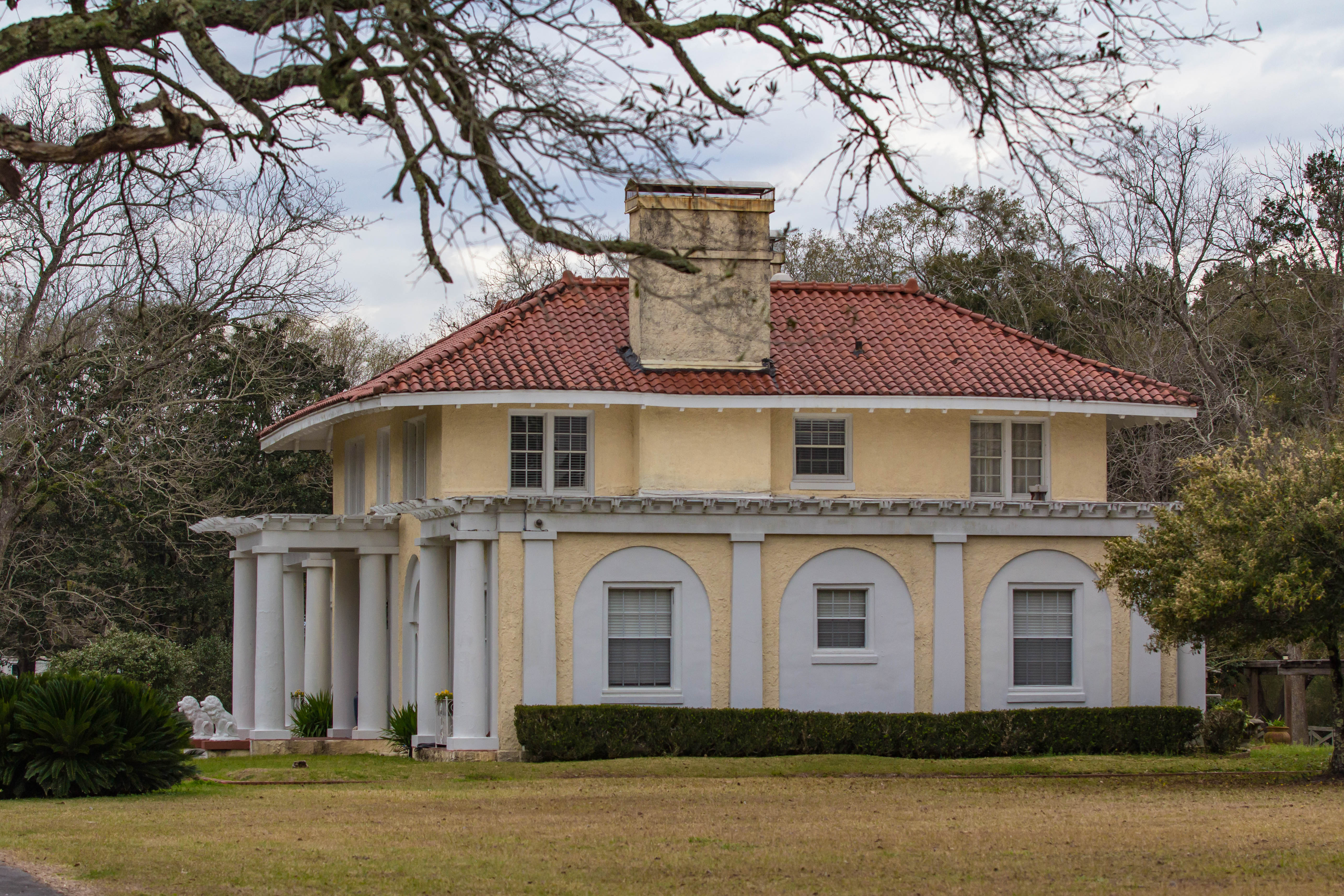

- Location within Alabama Location within the United States
- Location: Argyl Rd., St. Elmo, Alabama
- Coordinates: 30°27′1″N 88°15′37″W
- Area: 7 acres (2.8 ha)
- Built: 1925
- Architect: Bishop, Steven
- Architectural style: Mediterranean Revival
- NRHP reference No.: 85000255
- Added to NRHP: February 14, 1985

The Bishop Manor Estate is a historic estate near St. Elmo in rural Mobile County, Alabama, United States. Contributing to the National Register of Historic Places listing are a main house, a five bay garage, a guest house, two outbuildings, a swimming pool and a pavilion. Spread over a formally landscaped 7 acres (2.8 ha), the Mediterranean Revival style estate was built in 1925 by Steven Bishop. It was placed on the National Register of Historic Places on February 14, 1985.
