= Politics of New York (state) =

The State of New York is a blue state, or a state where Democratic Party candidates typically win elections. As of 2025, there are more than twice as many enrolled Democratic voters as there are enrolled Republican voters in New York. Democratic candidates prevailed in New York in every presidential election from 1988 to 2024. As of 2025, no Republican candidate had won a statewide election in New York since George Pataki was re-elected governor in 2002.

As of 2026, Democrat Kathy Hochul is the governor of New York; she has served in that capacity since 2021. Democrat Antonio Delgado has served as lieutenant governor since 2022, Democrat Letitia James has served as New York attorney general since 2019, and Democrat Tom DiNapoli has served as New York state comptroller since 2007. New York's two U.S. senators are Senate Minority Leader Chuck Schumer (a Democrat serving as a U.S. senator from New York since 1999) and Democrat Kirsten Gillibrand (serving since 2009). New York is represented by 19 Democrats and seven Republicans in the U.S. House of Representatives. The New York State Senate has been led by the Democratic Party since 2019, while the New York State Assembly has been led by the Democrats since 1975.

The State of New York has the distinction of having been the home state for both major-party nominees in three presidential elections. The 1904 presidential election saw former New York Governor and incumbent President Theodore Roosevelt face Alton B. Parker, chief judge of the New York Court of Appeals. The 1944 presidential election had Franklin D. Roosevelt, following in his cousin Theodore's footsteps as former New York Governor and incumbent president running for re-election against the then-incumbent New York Governor Thomas E. Dewey. In the 2016 presidential election, former United States Senator from New York Hillary Clinton, a resident of Chappaqua, was the Democratic Party nominee. The Republican Party nominee was businessman Donald Trump, a resident of Manhattan and a native of Queens.

This page contains party enrollment data as well as certain gubernatorial and presidential election results from New York's history.

== Party enrollment ==
New York party enrollment data as of February 20, 2025:
Party	%	Total voters		Total
Party	%	Active	Inactive	Total
Democratic	47.90	5,896,984	403,434	6,300,418
Republican	22.63	2,845,295	131,446	2,976,741
Conservative	1.27	160,125	7,107	167,232
Working Families	0.44	55,804	2,989	58,793
Minor parties	2.72	336,758	21,480	358,238
Unaffiliated	25.03	3,108,039	184,092	3,292,131
Total	100%	12,403,005	750,548	13,153,553

== Presidential and gubernatorial election results ==
United States presidential election results for New York
Year	Republican / Whig		Democratic		Third party(ies)	
Year	No.	%	No.	%	No.	%
2024	3,579,519	43.10%	4,619,543	55.62%	105,827	1.27%
2020	3,251,997	37.67%	5,244,886	60.76%	135,372	1.57%
2016	2,819,557	36.51%	4,556,142	59.00%	346,096	4.48%
2012	2,490,496	35.17%	4,485,877	63.35%	105,163	1.49%
2008	2,752,771	36.03%	4,804,945	62.88%	83,232	1.09%
2004	2,962,567	40.08%	4,314,280	58.36%	115,107	1.56%
2000	2,405,676	35.22%	4,113,791	60.22%	311,711	4.56%
1996	1,933,492	30.61%	3,756,177	59.47%	626,460	9.92%
1992	2,346,649	33.88%	3,444,450	49.73%	1,135,826	16.40%
1988	3,081,871	47.52%	3,347,882	51.62%	55,930	0.86%
1984	3,664,763	53.84%	3,119,609	45.83%	22,438	0.33%
1980	2,893,831	46.66%	2,728,372	43.99%	579,756	9.35%
1976	3,100,791	47.45%	3,389,558	51.87%	44,071	0.67%
1972	4,192,778	58.54%	2,951,084	41.21%	17,968	0.25%
1968	3,007,932	44.30%	3,378,470	49.76%	403,664	5.94%
1964	2,243,559	31.31%	4,913,156	68.56%	9,300	0.13%
1960	3,446,419	47.27%	3,830,085	52.53%	14,575	0.20%
1956	4,340,340	61.19%	2,750,769	38.78%	2,227	0.03%
1952	3,952,815	55.45%	3,104,601	43.55%	70,825	0.99%
1948	2,841,163	45.98%	2,780,204	45.00%	557,135	9.02%
1944	2,987,647	47.30%	3,304,238	52.31%	24,932	0.39%
1940	3,027,478	47.95%	3,251,918	51.50%	34,501	0.55%
1936	2,180,670	38.97%	3,293,222	58.85%	122,506	2.19%
1932	1,937,963	41.33%	2,534,959	54.07%	215,692	4.60%
1928	2,193,344	49.79%	2,089,863	47.44%	122,419	2.78%
1924	1,820,058	55.76%	950,796	29.13%	493,085	15.11%
1920	1,871,167	64.56%	781,238	26.95%	246,108	8.49%
1916	879,238	51.53%	759,426	44.51%	67,641	3.96%
1912	455,487	28.68%	655,573	41.27%	477,255	30.05%
1908	870,070	53.11%	667,468	40.74%	100,812	6.15%
1904	859,533	53.13%	683,981	42.28%	74,256	4.59%
1900	822,013	53.10%	678,462	43.83%	47,567	3.07%
1896	819,838	57.58%	551,369	38.72%	52,669	3.70%
1892	609,350	45.58%	654,868	48.99%	72,575	5.43%
1888	650,338	49.28%	635,965	48.19%	33,445	2.53%
1884	562,005	48.15%	563,154	48.25%	42,010	3.60%
1880	555,544	50.32%	534,511	48.42%	13,890	1.26%
1876	489,207	48.17%	521,949	51.40%	4,347	0.43%
1872	440,738	53.23%	387,282	46.77%	0	0.00%
1868	419,888	49.41%	429,883	50.59%	0	0.00%
1864	368,735	50.46%	361,986	49.54%	0	0.00%
1860	362,646	53.71%	312,510	46.29%	0	0.00%
1856	276,004	46.27%	195,878	32.84%	124,604	20.89%
1852	234,882	44.97%	262,083	50.18%	25,329	4.85%
1848	218,583	47.94%	114,319	25.07%	123,042	26.99%
1844	232,482	47.85%	237,588	48.90%	15,812	3.25%
1840	226,001	51.18%	212,733	48.18%	2,809	0.64%
1836	138,548	45.37%	166,795	54.63%	0	0.00%
1832	154,896	47.90%	168,497	52.10%	0	0.00%
1828	131,563	48.55%	139,412	51.45%	0	0.00%

Gubernatorial election results
Year	Democratic	Republican
1950	42.3% 2,246,855	53.1% 2,819,523
1954	49.6% 2,560,738	49.4% 2,549,613
1958	44.7% 2,553,895	54.7% 3,126,929
1962	44.0% 2,552,418	53.1% 3,081,587
1966	38.1% 2,298,363	44.6% 2,690,626
1970	40.3% 2,421,426	52.4% 3,151,432
1974	57.2% 3,028,503	41.9% 2,219,667
1978	51.0% 2,429,272	45.2% 2,156,404
1982	50.9% 2,675,213	47.5% 2,494,827
1986	64.6% 2,775,045	31.8% 1,363,968
1990	53.2% 2,157,087	21.4% 865,948
1994	45.5% 2,364,906	48.8% 2,538,702
1998	33.2% 1,570,317	54.3% 2,571,991
2002	33.5% 1,534,064	49.4% 2,262,255
2006	69.6% 3,086,709	28.7% 1,274,335
2010	62.5% 2,910,876	33.2% 1,547,857
2014	54.2% 2,069,480	40.2% 1,537,077
2018	59.6% 3,635,340	36.2% 2,207,602
2022	52.4% 3,031,801	46.7% 2,705,908

== Notable New York political figures ==
- Michael Bloomberg, Mayor of New York City (2002-2013)
- Hugh Carey, Governor of New York (1975-1983)
- Andrew Cuomo, Governor of New York (2011-2021)
- Mario Cuomo, Governor of New York (1983-1994)
- Thomas DiNapoli, New York State Comptroller (February 2007-)
- Kirsten Gillibrand, U.S. Senator (2009-)
- Rudy Giuliani, Mayor of New York City (1994-2001)
- Kathy Hochul, Governor of New York (2021-)
- Letitia James, New York State Attorney General (2018-)
- Ed Koch, Mayor of New York City (1978-1989)
- Zohran Mamdani, Mayor of New York City (2026-)
- Nelson Rockefeller, 49th Governor of New York (1959-1973)
- Charles Schumer, U.S. Senator (1999-)
- Charles Malcolm Wilson, Governor of New York (1973-1975)
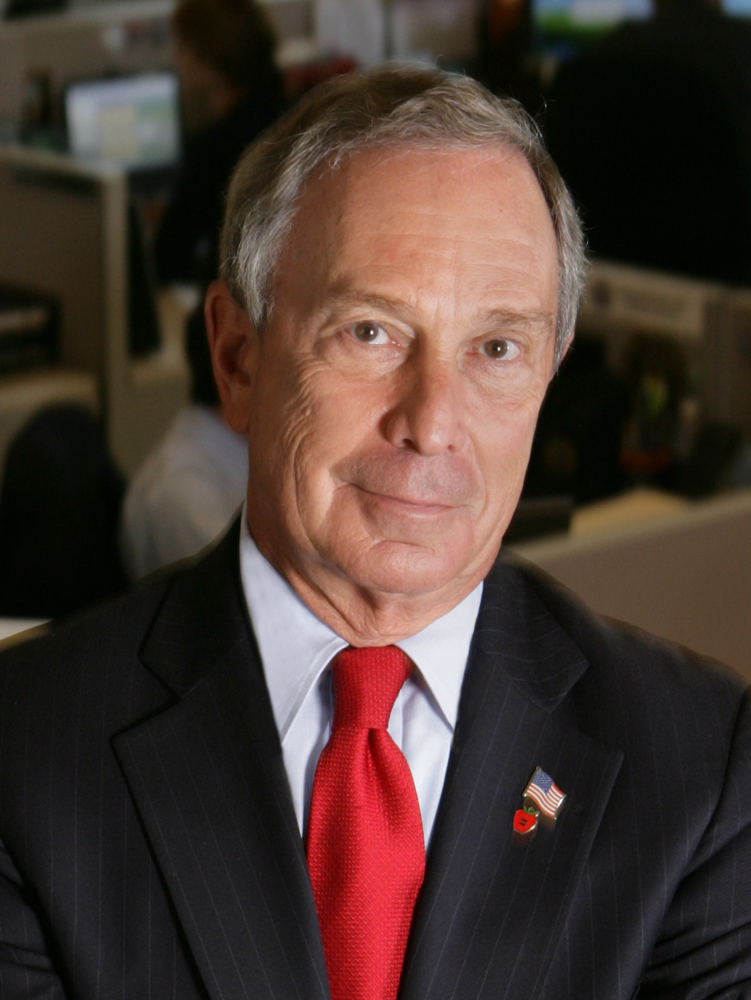
Mayor Michael Bloomberg in 2007

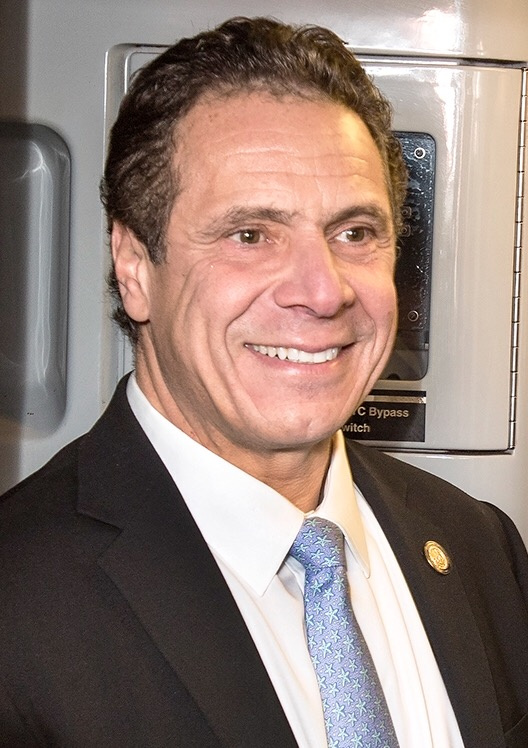
Governor Andrew Cuomo in 2017

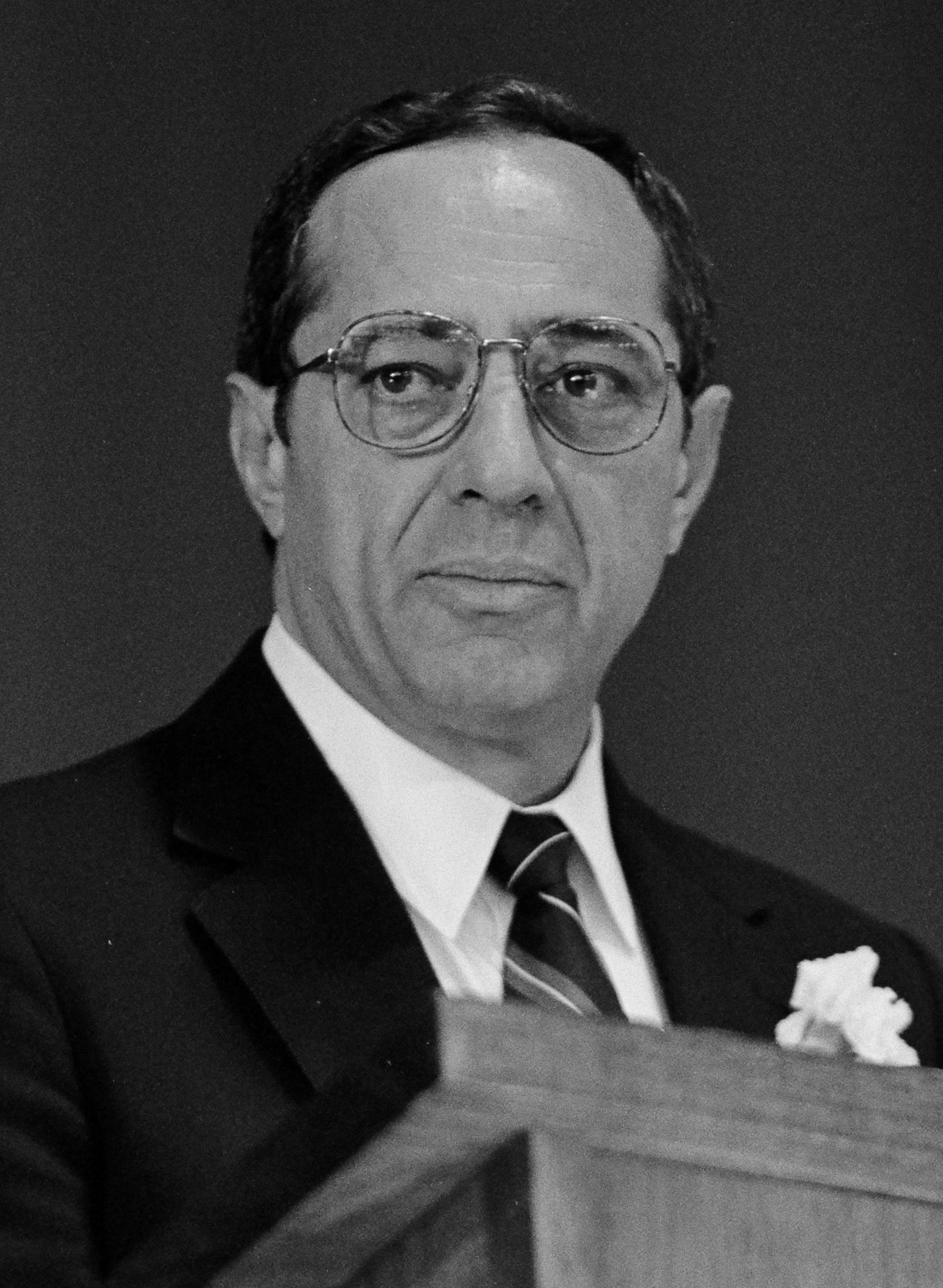
Governor Mario Cuomo in 1987

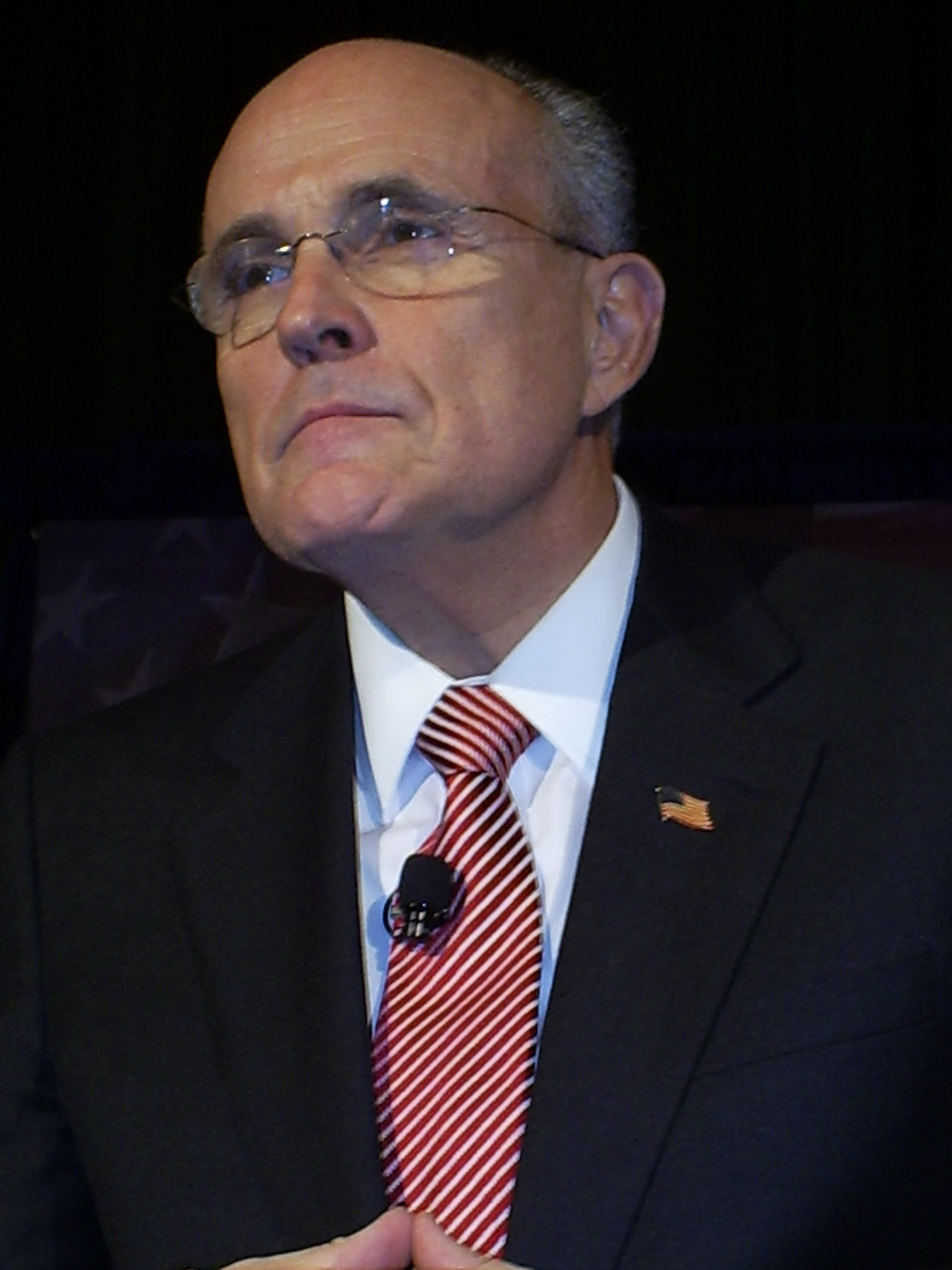
Former mayor Rudy Guliani in 2008

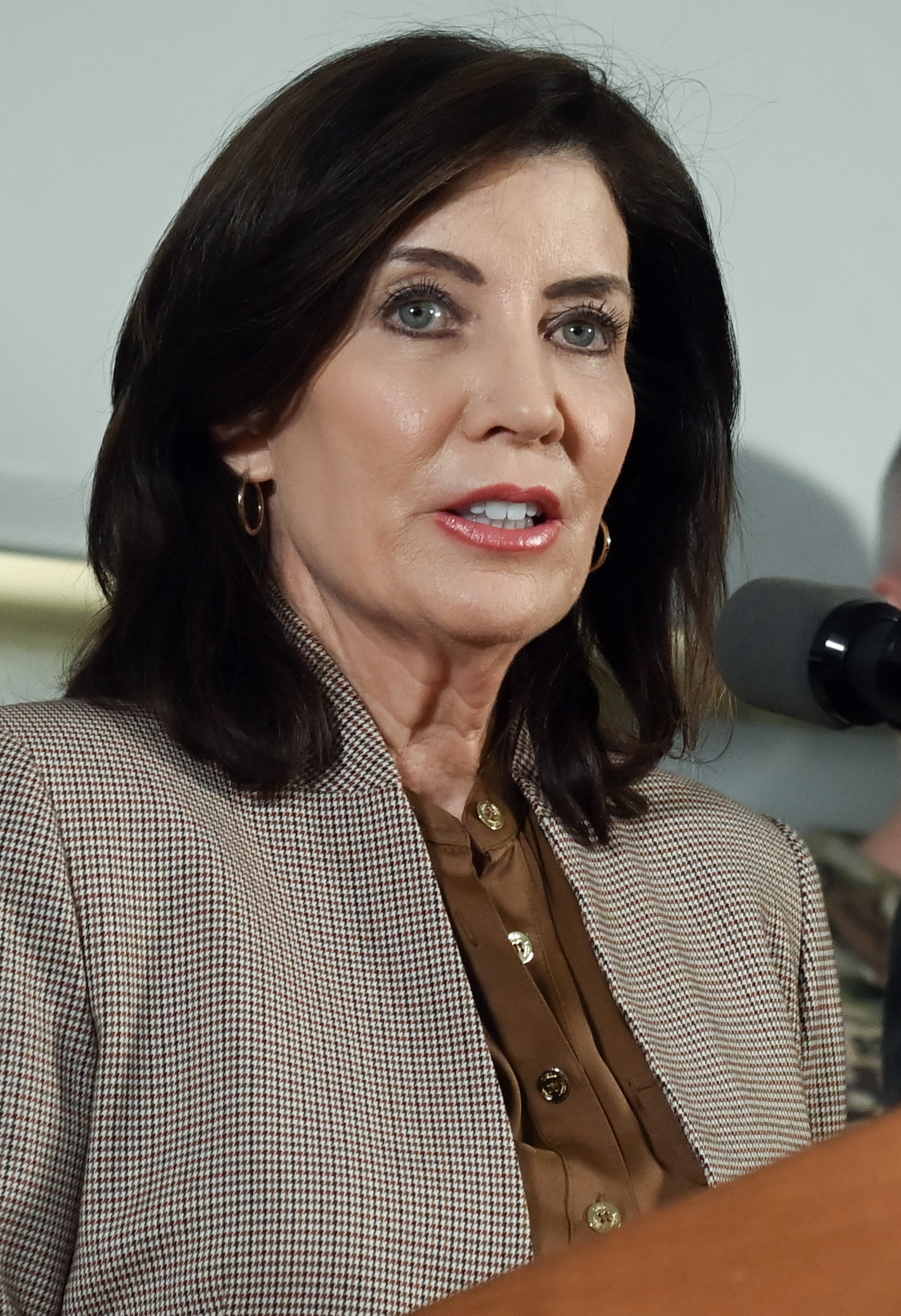
Governor Kathy Hochul in 2021

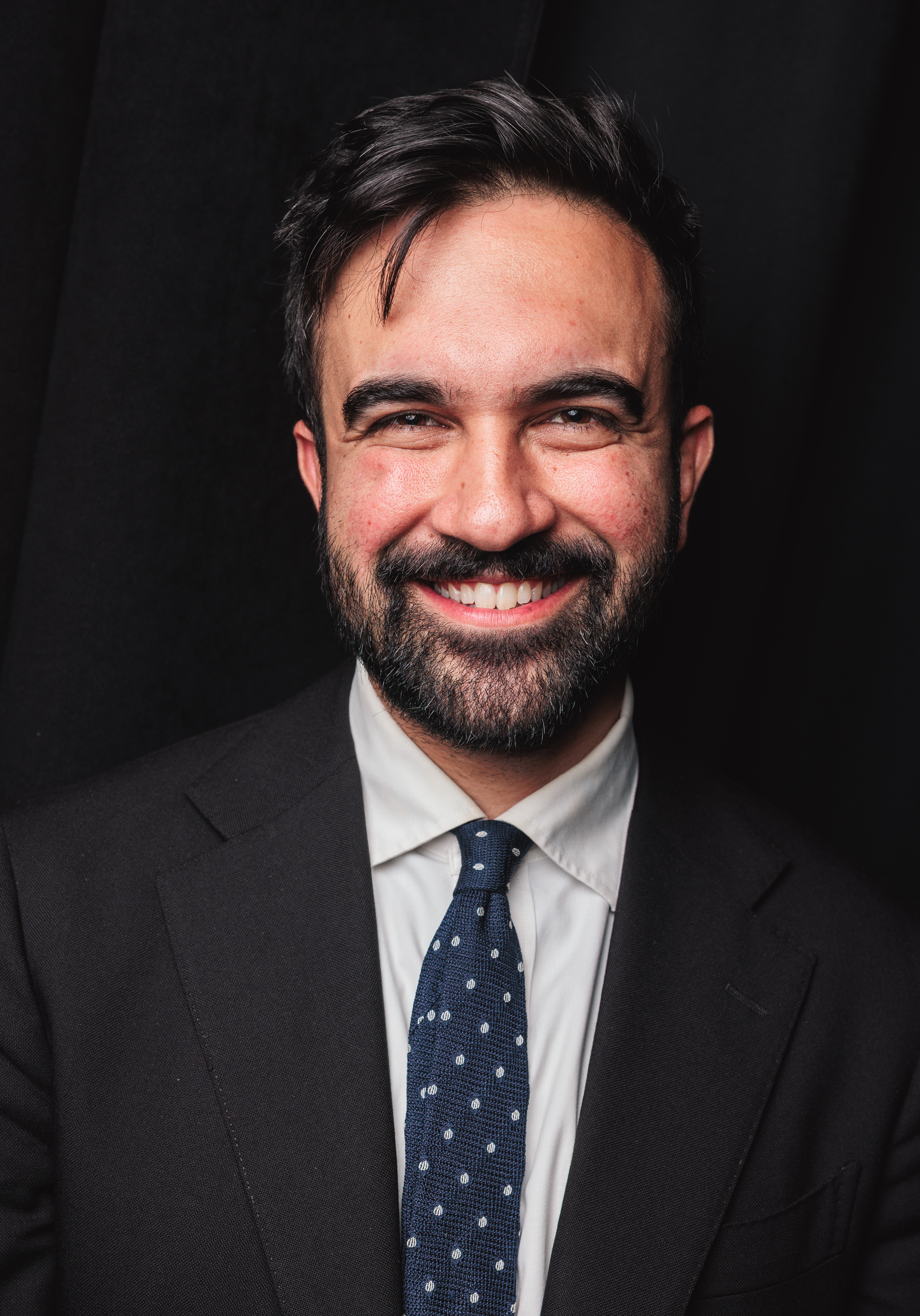
Mayor Zohran Mamdani in 2025

== See also ==
- 2009 New York State Senate leadership crisis
- C40 Cities Climate Leadership Group
- Elections in New York
- Electoral reform in New York
- Government of New York (state)
- Political party strength in New York (state)

=== Topics ===
- Alcohol laws of New York
- Climate change policy of New York
- New York divorce law
- Gun laws in New York
- New York energy law
- LGBT rights in New York
- Capital punishment in New York
- Rent control in New York
