= Martin T. Carey =

American businessman and real estate investor (1922–2020)

Martin Thomas Carey (March 23, 1922 – June 16, 2020) was an American entrepreneur and preservationist. He was a younger brother of New York Governor Hugh Carey.

== Early life ==
Carey was born in Brooklyn, New York, on March 23, 1922. He was the second youngest of six sons born to Margaret (née Collins) Carey and Dennis Joseph Carey Sr. Among his siblings were brothers, Edward M. Carey (president of Carey Energy Corporation), Dennis J. Carey Jr. (president of the family firm), Hugh L. Carey (a former U.S. Representative who served as Governor of New York from 1975 to 1982), John R. Carey and George G. Carey. His younger brother, George, a securities analyst, was killed in a plane crash in 1959.

He attended St. Augustine's School in the Bronx and St. Francis Preparatory School in Queens before attending St. John's University. In 1942, he enlisted in the U.S. Navy during World War II, where he earned the honor of being the youngest Naval Captain during the war. He served as captain of an oil tanker transporting gasoline for the Army between England and France.

== Career ==
After returning from the Western Front he attended Fordham University and became a marine manager and joined Peerless Petrochemicals (formerly Peerless Oil Company), the petroleum transport business founded by his parents, eventually becoming a partner and a harbor pilot. Carey later formed his own company, Marine Transport Company, known as MTC, with partner Raymond Connelly. MTC operated two barges and two tugs in the New York Harbor. Carey was also the owner of the Petroleum Combustion Corporation, a company he acquired in 1955 that supplies gasoline octane boosters and other additives for heating oil.

In 1975, Carey, who was described as short, dark haired and amiable, formed Petroleum Combustion International Inc. with Bruce Biersack to open a string of independent service stations known as Gas Value on Long Island. He also owned various real estate parcels ranging from the Matatuck terminal for petroleum products in Suffolk County and his family's summer home on Long Beach.

A trained Operatic tenor, Carey founded the Brooklyn Opera Company.

=== Historic preservation ===
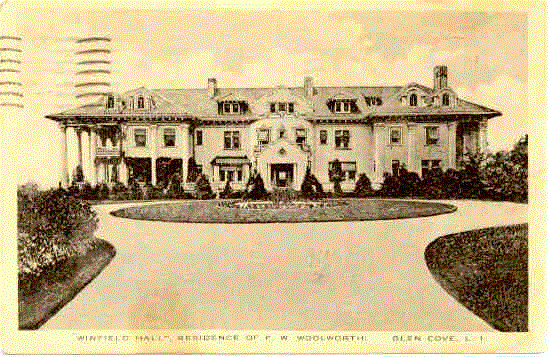
Carey's Winfield Hall in Glen Cove.

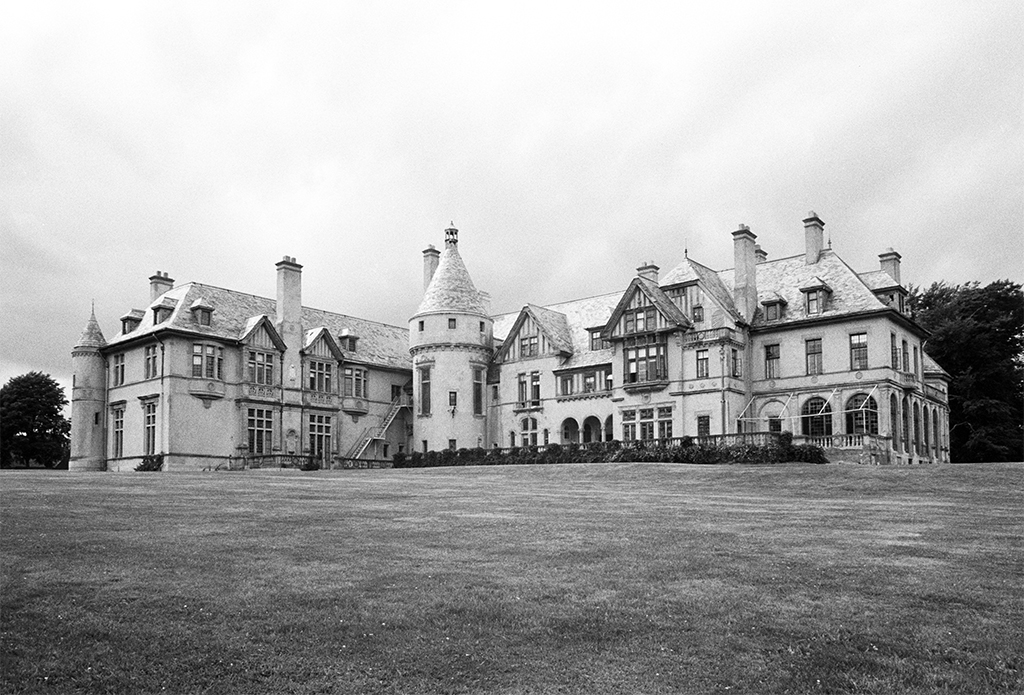
Carey's Seaview Terrace in Newport, Rhode Island.

Along with his wife Millicent, Carey worked to preserve and restore Historic mansions of the Gilded Age on the Gold Coast of Long Island and in Newport, Rhode Island. They bought a 22-room house in Lloyd Harbor, New York, before purchasing Winfield Hall set on 16 acres in Glen Cove in 1978. The home, which is also known as the Woolworth Estate, was designed in 1916 by architect C. P. H. Gilbert for Frank Winfield Woolworth, reportedly at a cost of $9 million. Parts of the 25,668 square-foot mansion were heavily damaged by fire in January 2015.

In 1974, the Careys paid $270,000 to purchase Seaview Terrace, the fifth-largest mansion in Newport built by Howard Greenley for Edson Bradley. They leased the Châteauesque main house, gatehouse and former stables to Salve Regina University, which renamed it the Carey Mansion. On August 31, 2009, Salve Regina University terminated the lease with the Carey family and the Careys' daughter began residing in the mansion. The Syfy network featured the mansion in the first season, second episode of its paranormal reality show Stranded on March 6, 2013. In 1975, when his elder brother Edward was asked during an interview about Martin's interests, he replied offhandedly, "Oh, he's in real estate and maritime transportation and he was making money renting out his house in Newport to make pornographic movies until the newspapers found out and it was stopped." Apparently, after several neighboring estates, including Rosecliff, had been rented for the filming of The Great Gatsby movie, an agent offered Carey a similar deal. He agreed, but the renter turned out to be Gerard Damiano, the adult film director best known for the 1972 cult classic Deep Throat. Damiano filmed The Story of Joanna at the mansion before the Newport News revealed Damiano's credits and the filming ceased.

In 1981, Carey purchased Bogheid, the 1938 mansion in Glen Cove that was designed by Delano and Aldrich in the French Manor style for Helen Porter Pryibil, daughter of New York City banker William H. Porter. He renamed the house to Cashelmara and used it as showcase for interior decorators. Later, the residence became vacant and fell into disrepair. The Society for the Preservation of Long Island Antiquities placed it on their list of endangered historic properties in 2010.

== Personal life ==
On October 10, 1971, Carey was married to Millicent Marie (née Zelenka) Hancock (b. c. 1935) at Church of St. Ignatius Loyola in New York City. An alumna of the Columbia University School of Nursing and Teachers College, Columbia University, where she earned B.S. and M.A. degrees in administration, Millicent was the daughter of Joseph William Zelenka of the Bronx, head of the accounting department of Metro-Goldwyn-Mayer Studios. She was divorced from Dr. Reginald Albert Hancock. Together, they were the parents of a daughter:

- Denise Anne Marie Carey (b. 1975), an architect specializing in preservation and restoration who married Christopher Bettencourt, the President of Bettencourt Electrical Contractors and the son of Michael Bettencourt and Carole Froias, in May 2015.

Carey died on June 16, 2020, at his home in Glen Cove, New York. After a funeral at St. Patrick's Church in Glen Cove, he was buried at Cemetery of the Holy Rood in Westbury, New York.

=== Legacy ===
Newport Tennis and Fitness founded the Martin T. Carey Camp for youth with disabilities and autism.
