= 1974 New York gubernatorial election =

- November 5, 1974
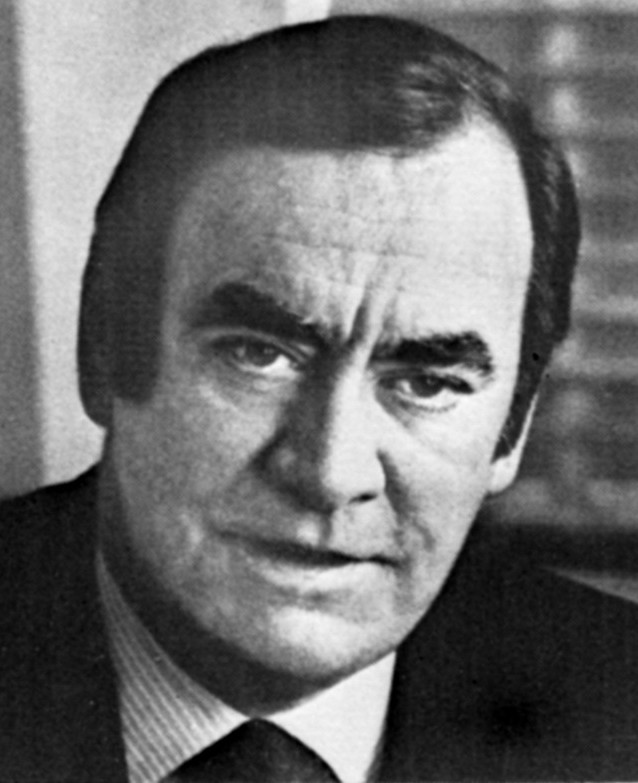

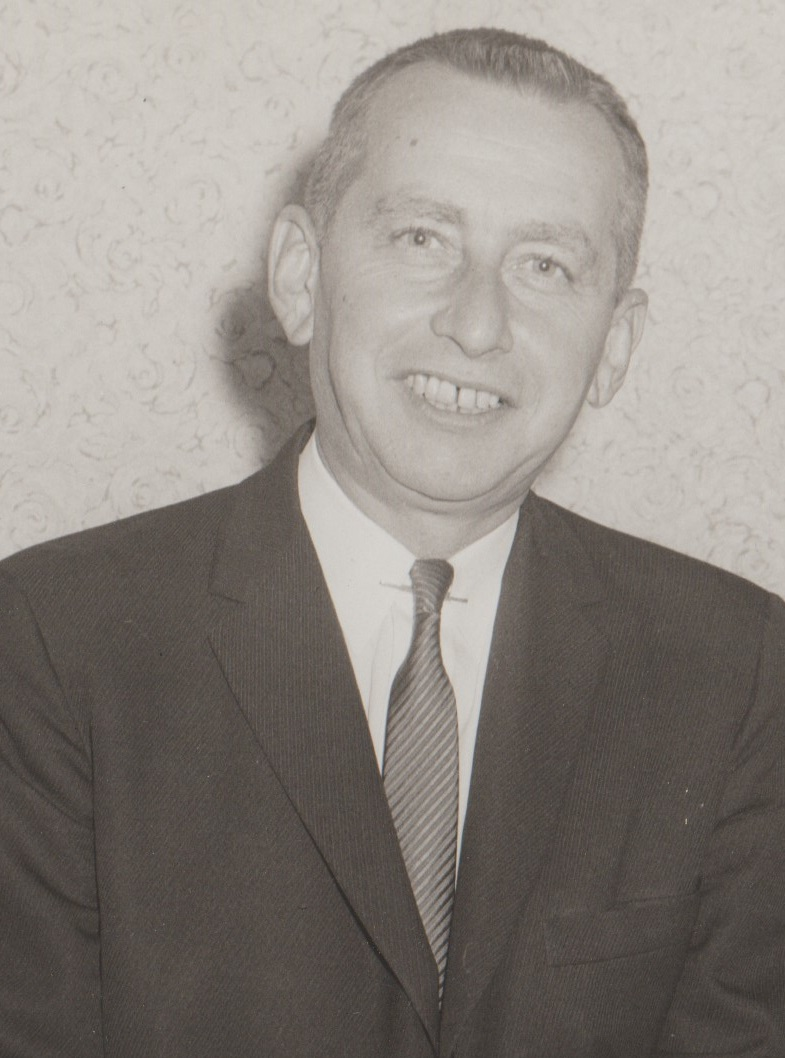
Nominee	Hugh Carey	Malcolm Wilson
Party	Democratic	Republican
Alliance	Liberal	Conservative
Running mate	Mary Anne Krupsak	Ralph G. Caso
Popular vote	3,028,503	2,219,667
Percentage	57.22%	41.94%
- County results Carey: 50–60% 60–70% 70–80% Wilson: 40–50% 50–60% 60–70%
Governor before election
Malcolm Wilson
Republican
Elected Governor
Hugh Carey
Democratic

The 1974 New York gubernatorial election was held on November 5, 1974 to elect the governor and lieutenant governor of New York. Republican incumbent Malcolm Wilson, who had ascended to the office following Nelson Rockefeller's 1973 resignation, ran for re-election and was defeated by U.S. representative Hugh Carey. Carey became the first Democratic governor of New York since W. Averell Harriman was defeated by Rockefeller in 1958.

== Republican nomination ==
=== Candidates ===
- Malcolm Wilson, incumbent governor since 1973

==== Declined ====
- Perry Duryea, speaker of the New York State Assembly
- Nelson Rockefeller, incumbent governor since 1959 (resigned December 18, 1973)

=== Campaign ===
Early speculation focused on whether or not Nelson Rockefeller would seek a fifth term or focus on a potential campaign for the presidency in 1976. If he did not run, the Republican nomination was expected to go to either lieutenant governor Malcolm Wilson or Assembly speaker Perry Duryea. Further speculation centered on whether Rockefeller, if he chose not to run, would resign to give Wilson an advantage in the race.

Around the time of Rockefeller's resignation, Duryea was indicted on electoral fraud charges. However, he remained popular and Republican leaders, including Rockefeller, made a public display of supporting him at Wilson's inauguration. Although the law under which he was indicted was later ruled unconstitutional, the legal troubles effectively neutralized any campaign, and Wilson was unopposed for the nomination.

=== Results ===
On June 12, the New York Republican State Committee met at the Nassau Coliseum and formally designated Wilson as their nominee without internal opposition.

== Conservative nomination ==
=== Candidates ===
- Malcolm Wilson, incumbent governor since 1973

==== Withdrew ====
- T. David Bullard, party vice chair, Saratoga County agriculturalist, and historic preservationist (withdrew June 28)

=== Campaign ===
Wilson sought the become the first Republican to gain the Conservative nomination for governor, as Rockefeller had never sought or won the party's support. He was challenged by T. David Bullard, the party vice chairman and a Saratoga fruit grower.

=== Convention results ===
Conservative convention results
Party	Candidate	Votes	%
Conservative	Malcolm Wilson (incumbent)	21,279	59.79
Conservative	T. David Bullard	14,312	40.21
Total votes		35,591	100.00

By the results of the convention, Bullard was entitled to run in the party primary against Wilson. Wilson invited Bullard to meet at the governor's mansion on June 25, and Bullard withdrew from the race on June 28. He denied that he had withdrawn in exchange for patronage appointments for Conservative Party members. "Our reward is in paradise, not in Albany," Bullard said. Other Conservative candidates who were entitled to run in the primary against Republican nominees, including Roy Cohn for U.S. Senate and Henry Paolucci for lieutenant governor, dropped out alongside Bullard.

=== Aftermath ===
On October 30, the board of elections cleared Wilson and Bullard of violating election laws, finding that Wilson "did not promise Mr. Bullard to appoint any specific person or persons to public office or pledge a specific number of jobs to Conservative Party members."

== Democratic primary ==
=== Candidates ===
- Hugh Carey, U.S. representative from Brooklyn
- Howard J. Samuels, consumer advocate, former administrator of the Small Business Administration, and 1970 candidate for governor

==== Withdrew ====
- Ogden Reid, U.S. representative from Purchase (withdrew May 31, 1974)

==== Declined ====
- John Lindsay, former mayor of New York City and 1972 candidate for president

=== Campaign ===
Samuels, who had lost the 1970 nomination to Arthur Goldberg, was initially favored for the nomination, but he faced a serious challenge from U.S. representative Hugh Carey. Samuels did not initially take the Carey campaign seriously, but Carey was able to spend $1,297,500 ($6,581,000 in 2025) donated or lent to his campaign by his brother, oil magnate Edward M. Carey. Carey's campaign was also staffed by volunteers loaned from his brother's company and led by consultant David Garth, whom his brother hired for millions of dollars. Garth convinced Carey to lose 30 pounds, dye his hair, get contact lenses and a new wardrobe, and cut back on drinking.

Although New York's new campaign finance law took effect on June 1, Carey was able to borrow or raise $950,000 before the law restricted fundraising. When Samuels accused Carey of exceeding the $105,000 limit on family contributions after June 1, Carey began paying his brother back with loans from his brother's business associates, including $250,000 in a single day. Samuels's attacks were neutralized in part by his own self-funding and Carey's reframing them as attacks on his family. Carey outspent Samuels on television advertising by a ratio of 8:1.

=== Results ===
Democratic primary results
Party	Candidate	Votes	%
Democratic	Hugh Carey	600,283	60.78
Democratic	Howard J. Samuels	387,369	39.22
Total votes		987,652	100.00

== General election ==
=== Candidates ===
- Wayne S. Amato (Courage)
- Hugh Carey, U.S. representative from Brooklyn (Democratic and Liberal)
  - Running mate: Mary Anne Krupsak, state senator from Schenectady
- Anton Chaitkin, author, historian, and LaRouche movement activist (U.S. Labor)
- John Emanuel (Socialist Labor)
- Derrick Morrison (Socialist Workers)
- Jose A. Ristorrucci (Communist)
- Jerome Tuccille, investment manager and anti-tax activist (Free Libertarian)
- Malcolm Wilson, incumbent governor since 1973 (Republican and Conservative)
  - Running mate: Ralph G. Caso, Nassau County executive

=== Campaign ===
During the campaign, Carey avoided criticizing the Rockefeller administration. Despite being members of opposing parties, Rockefeller had covertly supported Carey's congressional campaigns, and Carey limited his attacks to saying, "Rockefeller spent our money as if we had his money."

=== Results ===
New York gubernatorial election, 1974
Party	Candidate	Votes	%	±%
Democratic	Hugh Carey	2,807,724	53.05%	
Liberal	Hugh Carey	220,779	4.17%	
Total	Hugh Carey	3,028,503	57.22%	+16.95%
Republican	Malcolm Wilson	1,950,587	36.85%	
Conservative	Malcolm Wilson	269,080	5.08%	
Total	Malcolm Wilson (incumbent)	2,219,667	41.94%	−10.47%
Courage	Wayne S. Amato	12,459	0.24%	N/A
Libertarian	Jerome Tuccille	10,503	0.20%	N/A
Socialist Workers	Derrick Morrison	8,857	0.17%	+0.07%
Communist	Jose A. Ristorrucci	5,232	0.10%	−0.03%
Socialist Labor	John Emanuel	4,574	0.09%	+0.02%
U.S. Labor	Anton Chaitkin	3,151	0.06%	N/A
Majority		808,836	15.28%	+3.14%
Turnout		5,292,946		
Democratic gain from Republican				

== See also ==
- 1974 New York state election
