= Woolworth Estate =

Historic house in New York, United States

- U.S. National Register of Historic Places
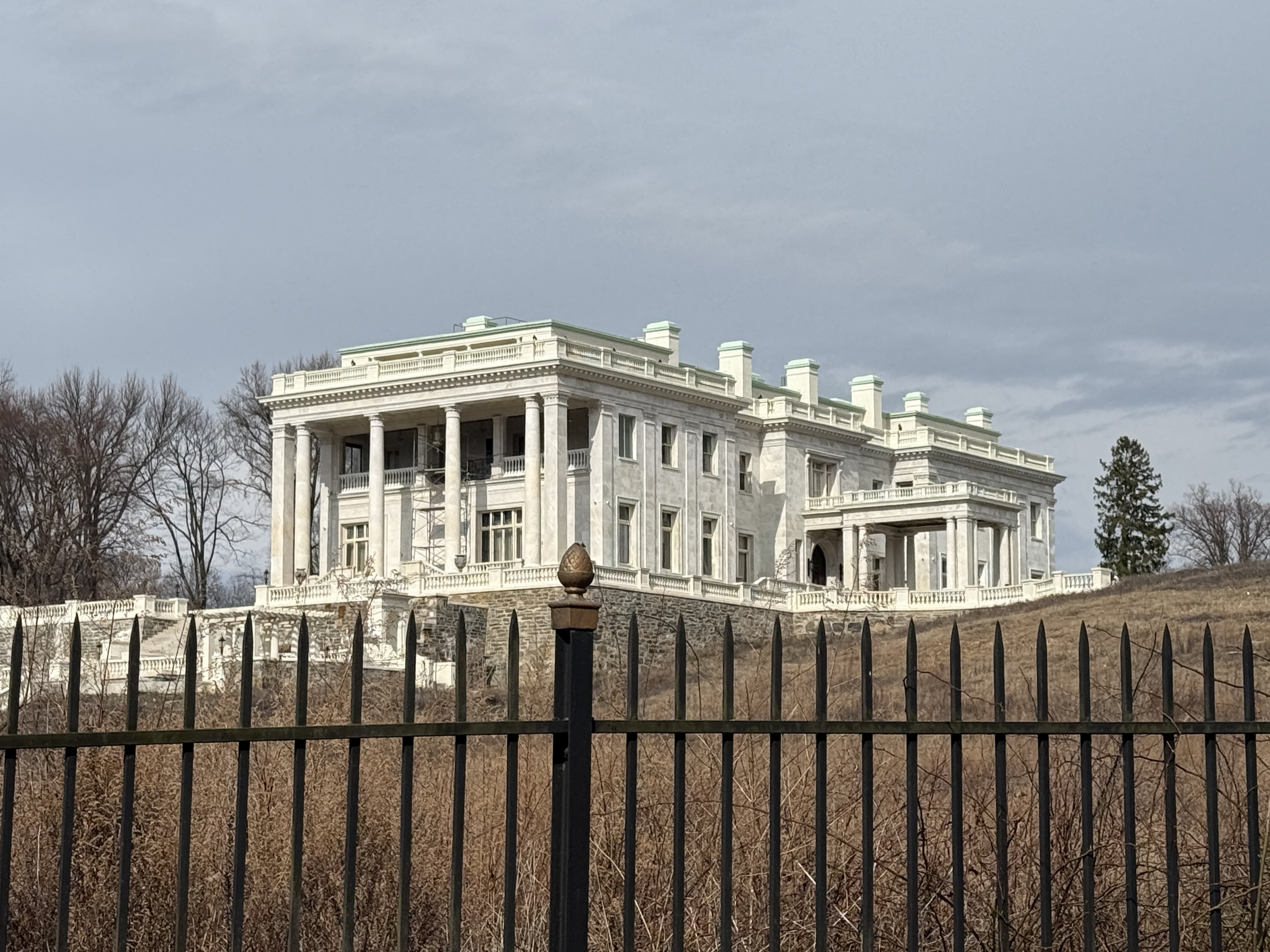
- Woolworth Estate in Glen Cove, Long Island

- Location within New York Location within the United States
- Location: 77 Crescent Beach Rd., Glen Cove, New York
- Coordinates: 40°52′31″N 73°38′38″W
- Area: 16 acres (6.5 ha)
- Built: 1916
- Architect: Gilbert, Charles P.H.
- Architectural style: Late 19th And 20th Century Revivals, Italian Renaissance
- NRHP reference No.: 79001593
- Added to NRHP: May 17, 1979

Woolworth Estate, also referred to as Winfield Hall, is a historic estate located in Glen Cove in Nassau County, New York. It was designed in 1916 by architect C. P. H. Gilbert (1861–1952) for Frank Winfield Woolworth (1852–1919). The estate consists of the main residence, known as Winfield Hall; a large garage with remodeled living quarters; a main entrance arch; two greenhouses; and various landscape features including a tea house.

== Winfield Hall ==
When his current home was destroyed by a mysterious fire, Woolworth immediately went to work on building Winfield Hall, the plans for which were already drawn. With walls and pillars of marble, the house ended up costing nine million dollars, the grand staircase alone costing two million dollars.

The 32,098 square feet (2,982.0 m^{2}) house is an Italian Renaissance style, marble covered residence with a five bay wide central mass and flanking four bay wide wings. It features a one bay central entrance portico and flat roof. After the Woolworths moved on, the house sat empty for years, and was purchased in 1929 by the wife of Richard S. Reynolds, of the R.S. Reynolds Metal Company fame. In 1945 work began to convert one two-story and basement structure into a research laboratory, corporate library and a 150-person auditorium. The new department was to be staffed by 150 technicians. In 1963, the house became the Grace Downs Academy, a business school for young ladies, then in 1978 was purchased by Martin T. Carey, brother to former Governor Hugh Carey of New York.

It was listed on the National Register of Historic Places in 1979. Part of the home was heavily damaged by fire on January 28, 2015.

== Ghostlore ==
Winfield Hall, like many other Long Island mansions, has ghostlore associated with it. It is said that on the evening of May 2, 1917, as Edna Woolworth Hutton, Frank Woolworth's middle daughter, took her own life at The Plaza Hotel in New York City, while her father was at Winfield Hall hosting a party, a somewhat bizarre and unexplained incident occurred. Located above Winfield Hall's main entrance fireplace, the marble family crest, containing the painted faces of his three daughters, acquired a crack through the face of Edna, leaving the two remaining faces, as well as the rest of the crest, untouched. A lightning bolt, the product of a severe thunderstorm, has been attributed as the cause of this crack. Shortly thereafter, stories of hearing strange noises in Winfield Hall, as well as reported observations of seeing a floating "spirit" wandering through the halls, began to circulate. Later, when Winfield Hall was being used as a business school for women, there were numerous reports of hearing a woman crying in the locked "Marie Antoinette" room, rumored to be the room where Edna Hutton had committed suicide, though her obituary states her death occurred elsewhere. Other people have reported hearing organ music playing on its own, while detailed descriptions of seeing what appears to be the ghost of a young woman "haunting" the gardens have also been noted.

== Popular culture ==
The estate was the setting for the promotional commercial of the professional wrestling video game, WWE 2K20, which depicted a cocktail party scene featuring various current and legendary WWE wrestlers, including the game's cover stars, Roman Reigns and Becky Lynch.

Parts of the music video for Taylor Swift's Blank Space was filmed at the estate.

== See also ==
- National Register of Historic Places listings in Oyster Bay (town), New York
