= Hugh Carey =

Governor of New York from 1975 to 1982

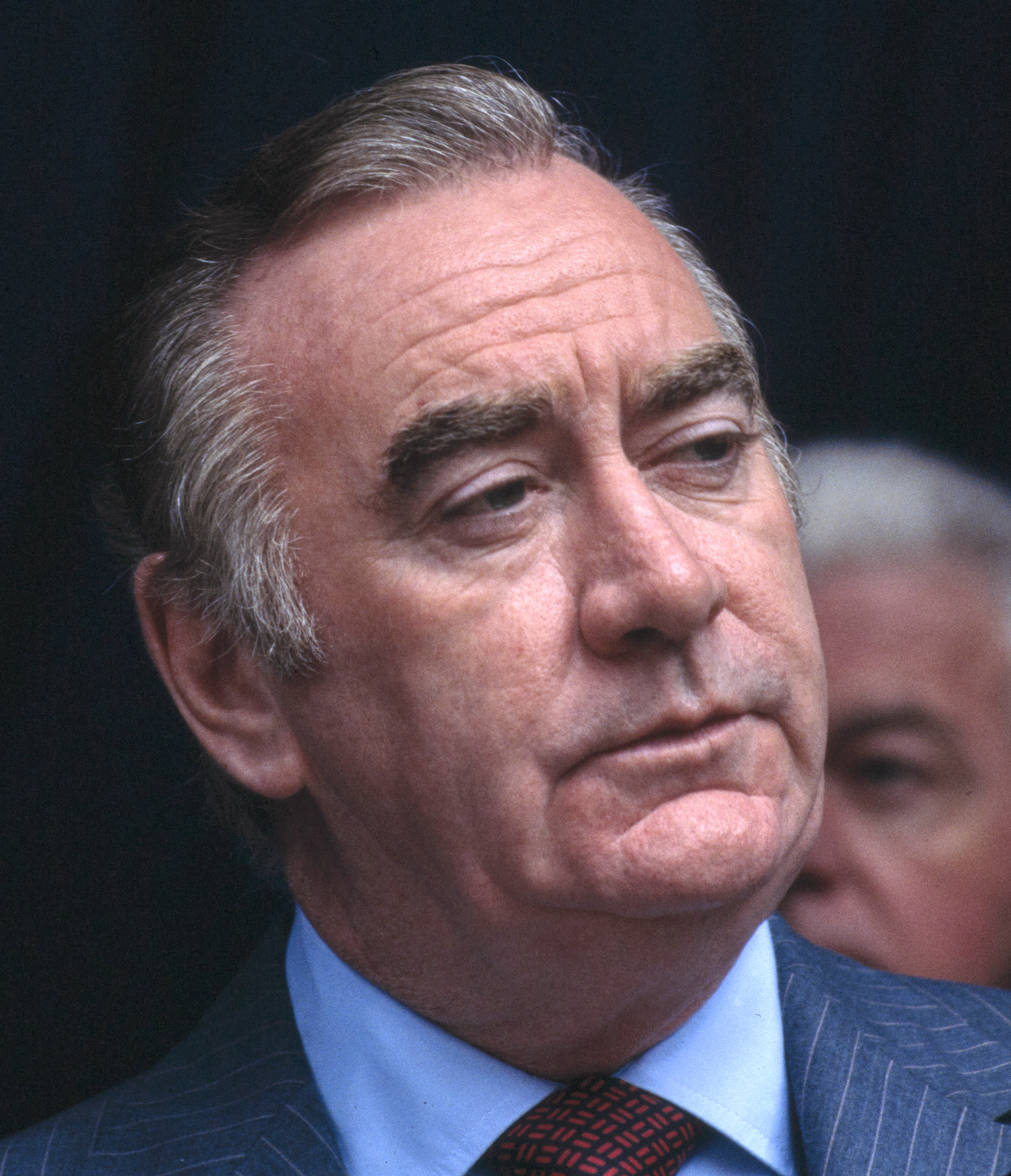
- Carey c. 1975–82

51st Governor of New York
- In office January 1, 1975 – December 31, 1982
- Lieutenant: Mary Anne Krupsak; Mario Cuomo
- Preceded by: Malcolm Wilson
- Succeeded by: Mario Cuomo

Member of the U.S. House of Representatives from New York
- In office January 3, 1961 – December 31, 1974
- Preceded by: Francis E. Dorn
- Succeeded by: Leo C. Zeferetti
- Constituency: 12th district (1961–1963); 15th district (1963–1974)

Personal details
- Born: Hugh Leo Carey; April 11, 1919 New York City, U.S.
- Died: August 7, 2011 (aged 92) Shelter Island, New York, U.S.
- Resting place: Our Lady of the Isle Cemetery Dering Harbor, New York, U.S.
- Party: Democratic
- Spouses: Helen Owen (m. 1947; died 1974) Evangeline Gouletas (m. 1981; div. 1989)
- Children: 14, including Paul
- Relatives: Edward M. Carey (brother); Martin T. Carey (brother)
- Education: St. John's University (BA, JD)
- Profession: Lawyer

Military service
- Allegiance: United States
- Branch: United States Army; New York ARNG
- Service years: 1939–1946
- Rank: Colonel
- Unit: 101st Cavalry Regiment; 415th Infantry Regiment; 104th Infantry Division
- Conflict: World War II; European Theatre
- Awards: Croix de Guerre; Bronze Star Medal

Hugh Leo Carey (April 11, 1919 – August 7, 2011) was an American attorney, businessman and Democratic Party politician who was the 51st governor of New York from 1975 to 1982. Prior to his election as governor, he represented Brooklyn in the U.S. House of Representatives from 1961 to 1974.

== Early life ==
Hugh Leo Carey was born in New York City on April 11, 1919 to Margaret (née Collins) and Dennis Joseph Carey. His siblings included brothers Edward M. Carey, later an oil magnate and president of Carey Energy Corporation, and Martin T. Carey, who later owned Winfield Hall and Bogheid in Glen Cove and Seaview Terrace in Newport, Rhode Island. He lived in Lefferts Manor, Brooklyn as a teenager with his family.

=== Military service ===
In 1939, Carey enlisted in the New York National Guard as a private in C Squadron, 101st Cavalry. He later served as a major in the 104th Infantry Division, known as the "Timberwolves", and as an operations officer in its 415th Infantry Regiment. Carey was with the 104th Division during its ten-month campaign in the Europe, which included combat in Northern France, Holland and Germany. He was awarded the Combat Infantryman Badge, the Bronze Star with Oak Leaf Clusters, and the Croix de Guerre with Silver Star. In 1946, he was discharged at the rank of colonel.

=== Education and early legal career ===
In 1942, Carey received a bachelor's degree from St. John's University. Following his military service, he returned to St. John's to study law and earned his Juris Doctor in 1951. He was admitted to the New York state bar that same year. Carey was a partner in the law firm of Finley, Kumble, Wagner, Underberg, Manley, Myerson & Casey.

== Early political career ==
Carey became involved in politics following his wartime service, before graduating from law school. In 1946, he was named co-chair of a New York State Democratic Committee youth division, intended to attract young voters to support Democratic candidates.

== U.S. House of Representatives (1961–74) ==
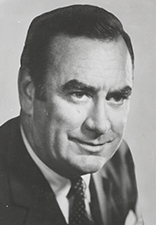
Carey as a congressman

In 1960, Carey was elected to the United States House of Representatives from a district centered around the Park Slope, Sunset Park and Bay Ridge neighborhoods of Brooklyn, unseating Republican incumbent Francis E. Dorn. Carey went on to serve seven terms in office until 1974, coinciding with major demographic changes in his district, including deindustrialization and the decline of the breakbulk cargo businesses on the Sunset Park waterfront; gentrification in eastern Park Slope; the coalescence of a nascent Puerto Rican community; and the opening of the Verrazzano–Narrows Bridge, which spurred the migration of many working class whites to Staten Island.

=== Great Society ===
Carey was an active supporter of the Great Society programs proposed by President Lyndon B. Johnson, particularly on the issue of special education. He served on the Ways and Means Committee and led efforts to pass the first federal educational aid program.

In 1965, Carey worked with Adam Clayton Powell, chair of the House Education and Labor Committee, to pass the Elementary and Secondary Education Act (ESEA). In 1966, Powell appointed Carey chair of the Subcommittee on the Education of the Handicapped. In that role, Carey introduced H.R. 14, a bill mirroring the ESEA and establishing a federal grant program to states for "initiating, expanding or improving education for children with disabilities." The bill, which also established a Bureau of Education for the Handicapped, was adopted in its final form as Title VI of the ESEA in 1966. Its grant program was later expanded in the Education for All Handicapped Children Act of 1975. Carey also sponsored successful legislation establishing a federal secondary school for the deaf at Gallaudet University and the National Technical Institute for the Deaf at Rochester Institute of Technology.

=== Vietnam War ===
Despite his support for Johnson's domestic programs, Carey was an early opponent of American involvement in the Vietnam War. Although Morningside Heights-based congressman William Fitts Ryan was the first congressman to oppose the war, Carey may have been the first member of the Brooklyn congressional delegation to speak out against the conflict, following discussions with several of his children.

=== 1969 New York City elections ===
In 1969, Carey ran briefly for the Democratic nomination for New York City mayor. He then agreed to run for City Council president on the ticket led by former mayor Robert F. Wagner Jr. Carey narrowly lost the primary to incumbent City Council president Francis X. Smith. After his primary defeat, he briefly mounted an independent bid for mayor, but he withdrew after the death of his two eldest sons in a car accident.

== Governor of New York (1975–82) ==
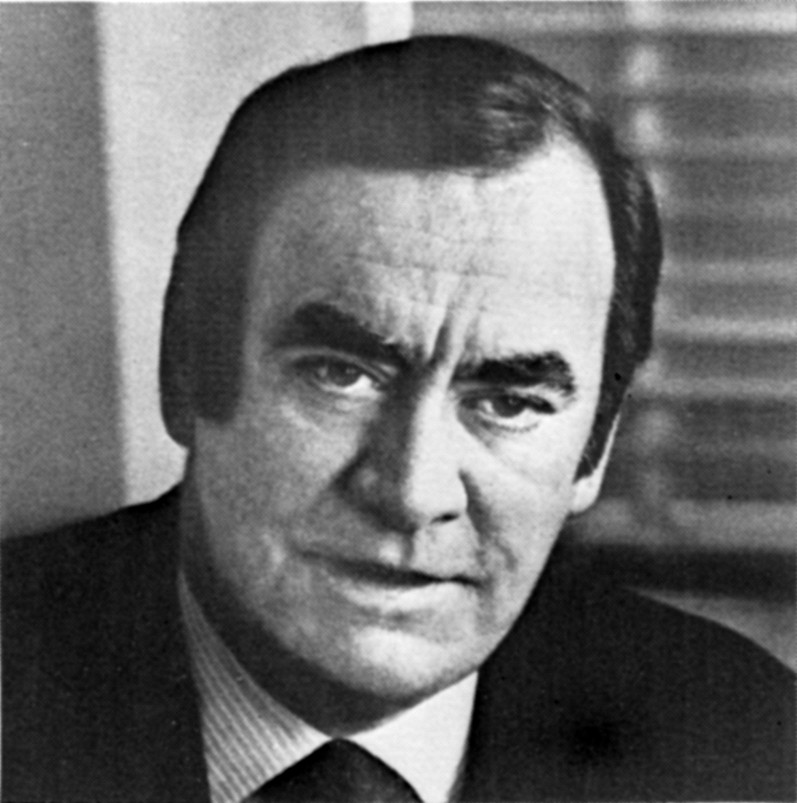
Carey in 1977

In the 1974 gubernatorial election, Carey became New York's first Democratic governor in 16 years, defeating Howard Samuels for the Democratic nomination and then unseating incumbent Republican Malcolm Wilson, who had assumed the office after Nelson Rockefeller resigned in December 1973 to serve on the Commission on Critical Choices for Americans. Nationally, 1974 was dominated by the Watergate scandal, which ended President Richard Nixon's presidency and hurt Republicans nationwide. In 1974, Democrats also recaptured the New York State Assembly.

Carey is best remembered for his successful handling of New York City's economic crisis in the mid-1970s. Carey came into office with New York City close to bankruptcy and is credited with bringing business and labor together to help save New York City from the fiscal crisis. He managed to keep the growth of state spending below the rate of inflation through his frequent use of line-item vetoes and fights with the New York State Legislature, which was at the time divided between a Republican-controlled Senate and a Democratic-controlled Assembly.

Upon taking office, Carey cut taxes significantly, reducing corporate taxes from 14% to 10%, and capping personal income tax at 9%, and reducing capital gains taxes as well. His administration also offered tax credits to encourage new investment. As governor, he was responsible for building the Jacob K. Javits Convention Center; Battery Park City; the South Street Seaport and the economic development of New York City's outer boroughs. He also helped provide state funding for the construction of the Carrier Dome at Syracuse University. He is also remembered for preventing conservative legislators from reinstating the death penalty and preventing such legislators from taking away state abortion laws.

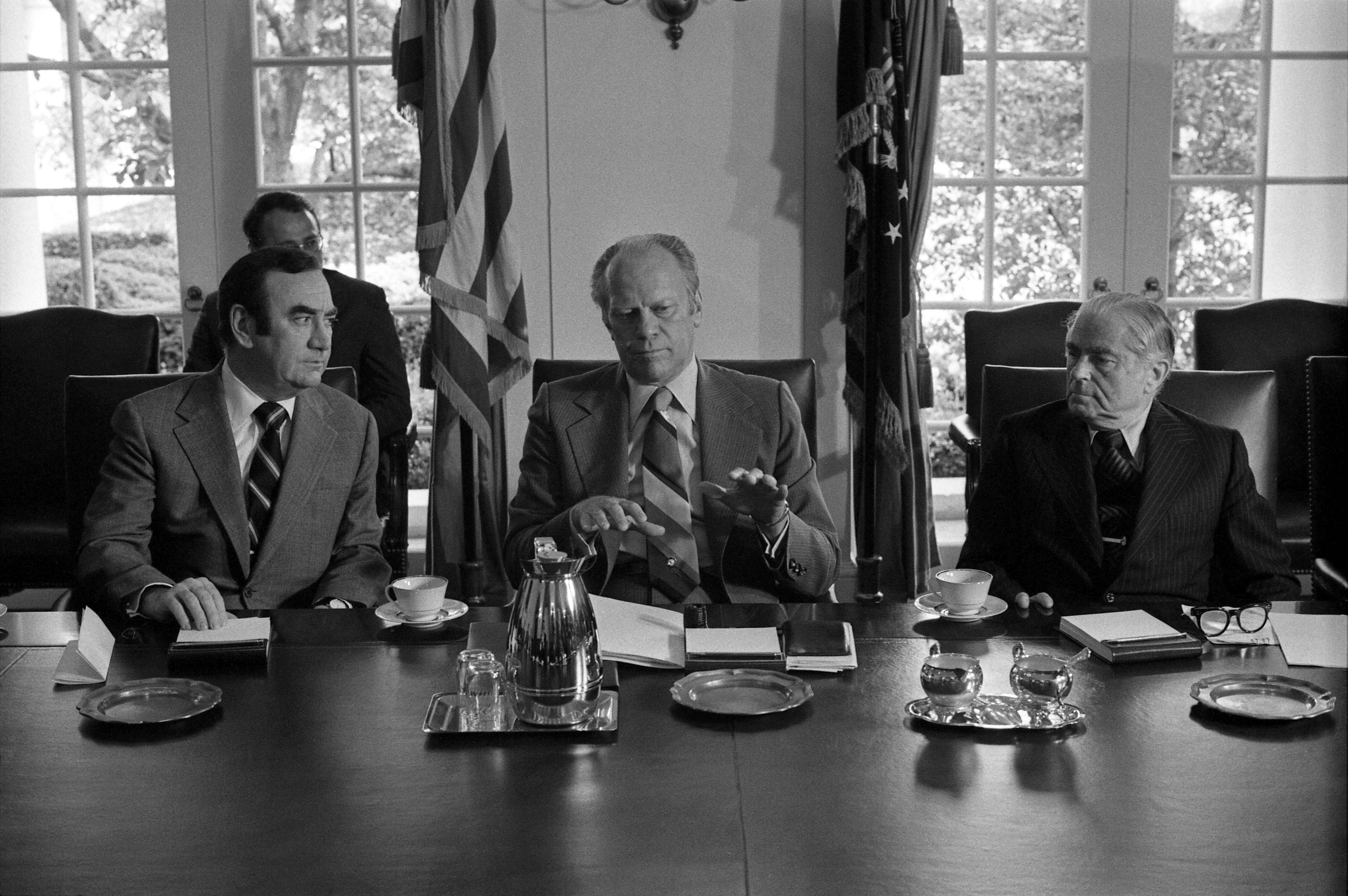
Carey (L) and New York City mayor Abraham Beame (R) meet with President Gerald Ford at the White House in 1975 to discuss federal financial aid for New York City

Carey signed the Willowbrook Consent Decree, which ended the hospitalisation of the mentally ill and developmentally disabled. His vision and leadership led to the community placement of the mentally ill and developmentally disabled, but also an increase of these people living on the streets. He also made major strides in community programs for the mentally ill. Carey also pardoned Cleveland "Jomo" Davis, one of the leaders of the Attica prison riots.

Carey's tenure in office was marked by a growing awareness of the environmental consequences of New York's strong industrial base, including the designation by the federal government of the Love Canal disaster area. Carey made environmental issues a priority of his administration. He was accused by Love Canal residents of being more concerned about the state's finances than the health of families living amidst one of the nation's most infamous environmental disasters.

Along with Senators Ted Kennedy and Daniel Patrick Moynihan and U.S. House Speaker Tip O'Neill, Carey led efforts to strengthen U.S. support for a political solution to the Northern Ireland conflict. The four Irish-American politicians called themselves "The Four Horsemen."

In 1977, he was an appellant in the Supreme Court case Carey v. Population Services International. Carey and his fellow appellants sought permission to continue enforcing laws prohibiting Population Services International (PSI) and others from distributing contraceptives to minors below 16 years old that had previously been struck down in a New York District Court. The Court upheld the lower court's determination that the law violated the Due Process Clause of the Fourteenth Amendment to the Constitution and the rights of privacy afforded to individuals, including minors.

Carey considered running for president in 1976 and 1980. Carey's first wife had died in 1974, and Carey later attributed his decision not to seek the Democratic nomination for president in 1976 to her death. In 1978, he was challenged for re-election by State Assembly Minority Leader and former Assembly Speaker Perry Duryea. After a competitive, sometimes negative campaign, Carey was the first Democrat re-elected in 40 years. In 1980, he decriminalized homosexuality in New York State.

According to political scientist and author Daniel C. Kramer, "The Carey Administration had a hand in many important projects, the modernization of New York City's subways and the rescue of homeowners living in the Love Canal neighborhood being just two, before Carey committed several serious blunders which lowered voters' opinion of him that he decided not to run for reelection in 1982. Through it all, this man with the embarrassingly low poll ratings turned into a superb governor."16 On January 1, 1983, he was succeeded by his lieutenant governor, Mario Cuomo.

=== Later career ===
In 1989, Carey announced that he was no longer pro-choice and regretted his support for legalized abortion and public financing of abortion as governor. In 1992, he joined other anti-abortion leaders in signing the anti-abortion document "A New American Compact: Caring About Women, Caring for the Unborn."

Later in his life, he was of counsel at the law firm of Shea & Gould. He continued to practice law as a member of the Harris Beach law firm and sat on the board of Triarc Cos., the Nelson Peltz controlled holding company.

== Personal life ==
In 1947, Carey married Helen Owen (1924–1974). They had fourteen children: Alexandria, Christopher, Susan, Peter, Hugh Jr., Michael, Donald, Marianne, Nancy, Helen, Bryan, Paul, Kevin, and Thomas. Peter and Hugh Jr. died in an automobile accident in 1969. Beginning in 1961, the family resided at 61 Prospect Park West; Carey sold the home a decade later to journalist Pete Hamill.

In 1974, Helen died of breast cancer. Carey was devastated by the death of his wife and laid to rest any plans for the White House. Paul, who served as White House Special Assistant to President Bill Clinton as well as 77th Commissioner of the Securities and Exchange Commission, died of cancer in 2001.

In 1981, Carey married Evangeline Gouletas, a Chicago-based real estate mogul, just three months after meeting her. This marriage was controversial, due to false statements Gouletas made about her background, and became a political liability. Gouletas initially claimed that she was a widow of a single marriage but later affirmed on the marriage license that she had two ex-husbands. In reality, she actually had three previous marriages, and all three of her former husbands were still living. Carey, who was a member of the Catholic Church, which does not recognize no-fault divorce, was refused communion. Carey and Gouletas divorced in 1989. He later described their marriage as "his greatest failure."

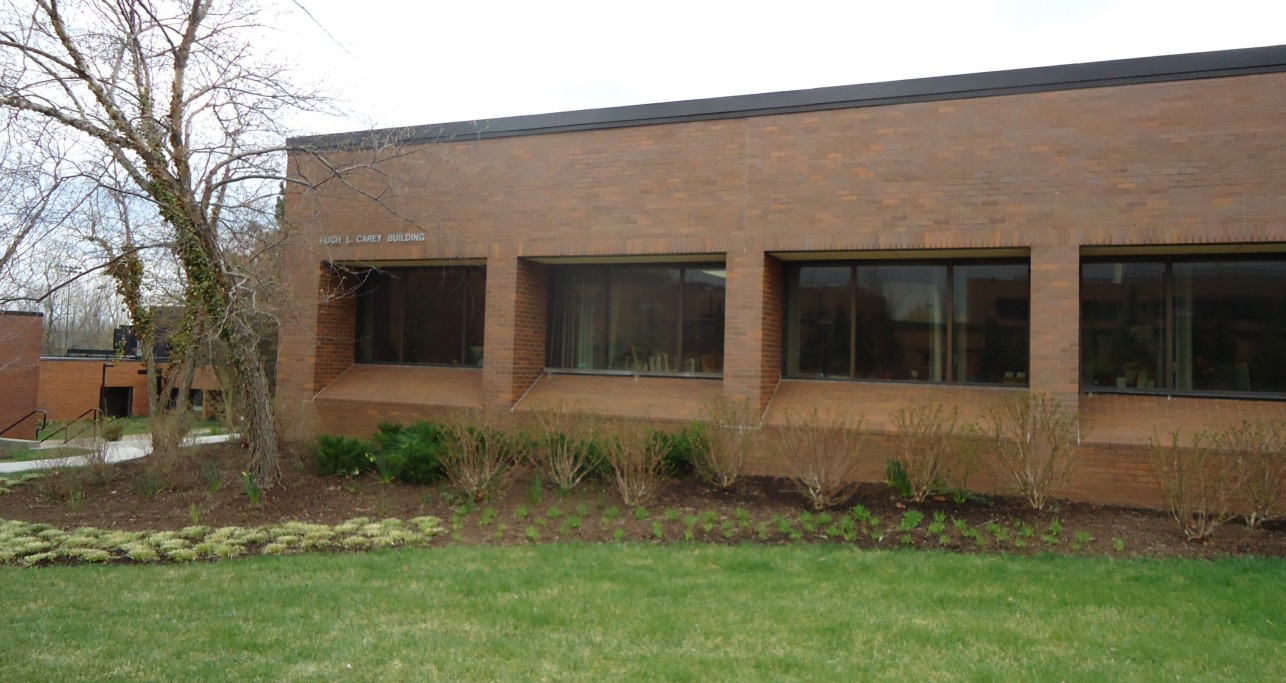
Building 14 at the Rochester Institute of Technology was named for Carey in 1984

== Death and legacy ==
Carey died on August 7, 2011 surrounded by his family at his summer home on Shelter Island, New York.

=== Legacy ===
Building 14 at the Rochester Institute of Technology was named for Carey in 1984.

On October 22, 2009, Carey received the University at Albany Foundation's Citizen Laureate Award. On October 22, 2012, the Brooklyn–Battery Tunnel was officially renamed the Hugh L. Carey Tunnel.

== Bibliography ==
- Kramer, Daniel C. (1997). The Days of Wine and Roses are Over: Governor Hugh Carey and New York State. University Press of America. ISBN 9780761805625.
- Lachman, Seymour P.; Polner, Robert (2010). The Man Who Saved New York: Hugh Carey and the Great Fiscal Crisis of 1975. Albany: SUNY Press.
- Paterson, David "Black, Blind, & In Charge: A Story of Visionary Leadership and Overcoming Adversity."Skyhorse Publishing. New York, New York, 2020

=== Primary sources ===
- Almeida, Linda Dowling, Peter Quinn, and Hugh Carey. "Oral History: Governor Hugh Carey Interviewed by Peter Quinn." American Journal of Irish Studies (2012): 179–190. in JSTOR

U.S. House of Representatives
Preceded by Francis E. Dorn	Member of the U.S. House of Representatives from New York's 12th congressional district 1961–1963	Succeeded by Edna F. Kelly
Preceded by John H. Ray	Member of the U.S. House of Representatives from New York's 15th congressional district 1963–1974	Succeeded by Leo C. Zeferetti
Political offices
Preceded by Malcolm Wilson	Governor of New York; 1975–1982	Succeeded by Mario Cuomo
Party political offices
Preceded by Arthur Goldberg	Democratic nominee for Governor of New York; 1974, 1978	Succeeded by Mario Cuomo
