= Perry B. Duryea Jr. =

American politician

Perry Belmont Duryea Jr.

114th Speaker of the New York State Assembly
- In office January 8, 1969 – December 31, 1974
- Governor: Nelson Rockefeller; Malcolm Wilson
- Preceded by: Anthony J. Travia
- Succeeded by: Stanley Steingut

Member of the New York State Assembly
- In office January 1, 1961 – December 31, 1978
- Preceded by: Irving L. Price Jr.
- Succeeded by: John L. Behan
- Constituency: 1st Suffolk district (1961–1965); 1st district (1966–1978)

Personal details
- Born: October 18, 1921 Montauk, New York, U.S.
- Died: January 11, 2004 (aged 82) Southampton, New York, U.S.
- Cause of death: Car accident
- Spouse: Marie Therese Duryea
- Children: two
- Education: Colgate University

Perry Belmont Duryea Jr. (October 18, 1921 – January 11, 2004) was an American politician. A Republican, Duryea was a longtime member of the New York State Assembly. He served as speaker of the Assembly from 1969 to 1973 and ran unsuccessfully for Governor of New York in 1978. To date, Duryea is the last Republican to serve as speaker of the New York State Assembly.

== Life and career ==
Duryea was born on October 18, 1921, in Montauk, Suffolk County, New York, the son of Perry B. Duryea Sr. (1891–1968). Duryea Sr. ran a wholesale seafood business, and later was a state senator and State Conservation Commissioner. Duryea Jr. attended East Hampton High School and graduated from Colgate University in 1942.

He attained the rank of lieutenant commander in the U.S. Navy as a pilot of the U.S. Naval Air Transport Service, and entered the family business full-time after World War II.

In 1944 Duryea married Elizabeth Ann Weed with whom he had two children, Lynn Duryea born in 1947 and Perry B. Duryea III born in 1949. The Duryeas divorced in 1990. Perry Duryea subsequently married Marie Therese Duryea.

Duryea was a Republican member of the New York State Assembly from 1961 to 1978. On December 13, 1965, he was elected Minority Leader to replace George L. Ingalls at the beginning of the session of 1966. Duryea served as Assembly Minority Leader until becoming Speaker of the New York State Assembly; he held that position from 1969 to 1973 and served as Minority Leader again from 1974 to 1978. After the Watergate scandal the Republicans lost their majority in the Assembly, and Duryea remains the last Republican speaker of the New York assembly. Duryea was active in fighting against development of eastern Long Island including a successful fight in 1967 to stop plans to turn the Grumman Assembly Plant in Calverton, New York into the fourth major airport in metropolitan New York City.

Duryea was a delegate to the New York State Constitutional Convention of 1967, and a member of the New York Republican State Central Committee in 1968.

Duryea was indicted for alleged election law violations in 1973, but charges were dropped. He was the defendant in People v. Duryea, 76 Misc.2d 948, 351 N.Y.S.2d 978 (1974), affirmed 44 A.D.2d 663, 354 N.Y.S.2d 129 (1974), a case about the right to anonymous free speech, later cited with approval in McIntyre v Ohio Election Commission (1995).

In 1978, Duryea was the Republican candidate for Governor of New York, but lost to the incumbent Hugh Carey. During the campaign, he had called for juveniles to be tried as adults for certain violent crimes, a move steadfastly opposed by Carey. The situation was dramatically altered, however, when Willie Bosket, a 15-year-old from Harlem, murdered three people in the New York City Subway and was only sentenced to five years in a state youth facility. The outcry over such a lenient sentence led Carey to reverse course and support a law allowing juveniles as young as 13 to be tried as adults.

A New York State office building in Hauppauge, Long Island, was renamed the Perry B Duryea Jr State Office Building at the request of Suffolk County Court Judge, the Hon. Martin J Kerins.

The post office in Montauk, New York was renamed the Perry B. Duryea Jr. Post Office.

Duryea died on January 11, 2004, in Southampton Hospital in Southampton, New York, from injuries suffered in a car accident and was buried at the Fort Hill Cemetery in Montauk.

New York State Assembly
Preceded by Irving L. Price Jr.	Member of the New York State Assembly from the Suffolk County 1st district 1961–1965	Succeeded by district abolished
Preceded by new district	Member of the New York State Assembly from the 1st district 1966–1978	Succeeded by John L. Behan
Political offices
Preceded by George L. Ingalls	Minority Leader of the New York State Assembly; 1966–1968	Succeeded by Stanley Steingut
Preceded by Moses M. Weinstein; Acting	Speaker of the New York State Assembly; 1969–1974	Succeeded by Stanley Steingut
Preceded by Stanley Steingut	Minority Leader of the New York State Assembly; 1975–1978	Succeeded by James L. Emery
Party political offices
Preceded by Malcolm Wilson; 1974	Republican Nominee for Governor of New York; 1978	Succeeded by Lewis Lehrman; 1982
