= Francis E. Dorn =

American politician (1911–1987)

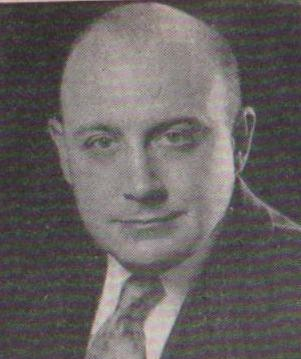

Member of the U.S. House of Representatives from New York's 12th district
- In office January 3, 1953 – January 3, 1961
- Preceded by: John J. Rooney
- Succeeded by: Hugh L. Carey

Member of the New York State Assembly from the Kings County, 10th district
- In office January 1, 1941 – December 31, 1942
- Preceded by: William C. McCreery
- Succeeded by: Walter E. Cooke

Personal details
- Born: April 18, 1911 Brooklyn, New York, U.S.
- Died: September 17, 1987 (aged 76) New York City, New York, U.S.
- Resting place: Green-Wood Cemetery
- Party: Republican
- Education: Fordham University; Fordham University School of Law

Military service
- Allegiance: United States
- Branch/service: United States Navy; United States Navy Reserve
- Years of service: 1942–1946
- Rank: Commander
- Battles/wars: World War II

Francis Edwin Dorn (April 18, 1911 – September 17, 1987) was a member of the United States House of Representatives from New York. He was the last Republican to represent the 12th district.

== Life ==
He was born on April 18, 1911, in Brooklyn. He attended St. Augustine and Bishop Loughlin Memorial High Schools. Dorn graduated from Fordham University in 1932, and Fordham University School of Law in 1935. He also studied at NYU Wagner School of Public Service in 1936. Dorn was admitted to the bar that year and began his practice in Brooklyn.

He was a member of the New York State Assembly (Kings Co., 10th D.) in 1941 and 1942. He resigned his seat on April 1, 1942, and enlisted in the United States Navy. Dorn served four years overseas during World War II and was discharged in 1946 as a lieutenant commander of the Naval Reserve. He was later promoted to commander.

He was elected as a Republican to the 83rd United States Congress, holding office from January 3, 1953, to January 3, 1961. (He is the most recent Republican to represent the 12th District, and the only one since Charles St. John left office in 1875.) Dorn voted in favor of the Civil Rights Acts of 1957 and 1960. He advocated adding the phrase "under God" into the formerly nonsectarian Pledge of Allegiance in 1954. He was defeated for re-election in 1960 by his neighbor, future New York governor Hugh Carey, and thereafter continued in business as owner of his F.E.D. Concrete Company until his death.

Dorn died on September 17, 1987, in New York City; and was buried at the Green-Wood Cemetery.

Dorn's Park Slope mansion was purchased by actor Paul Bettany and his wife, actress Jennifer Connelly.

== See also ==
New York State Assembly
Preceded by William C. McCreery	New York State Assembly; Kings County, 10th District; 1941–1942	Succeeded by Walter E. Cooke
U.S. House of Representatives
Preceded by John J. Rooney	Member of the U.S. House of Representatives from New York's 12th congressional district 1953–1961	Succeeded by Hugh L. Carey
