= Bogheid =

Historic mansion in Glen Cove, New York

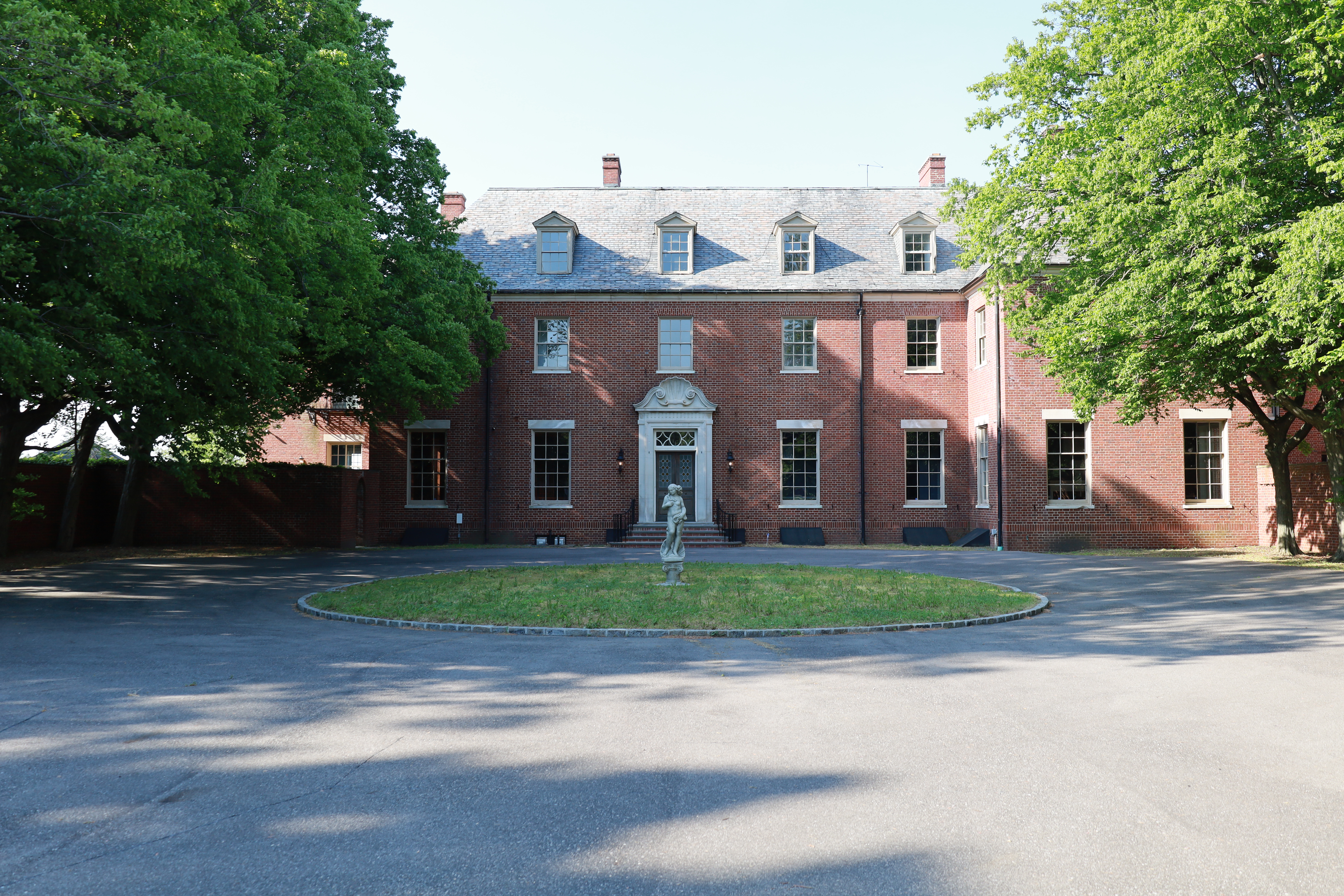
- Southern façade
- Interactive map of the Bogheid area
- Former names: Cashelmara

General information
- Type: Mansion
- Architectural style: French manor
- Location: Glen Cove, New York
- Coordinates: 40°53′37″N 73°37′22″W
- Completed: 1938
- Owner: Helen Porter Pryibil (originally); Private Owner (current)

Technical details
- Structural system: Masonry load bearing walls
- Material: Brick
- Floor count: 2.5 stories

Design and construction
- Architecture firm: Delano and Aldrich

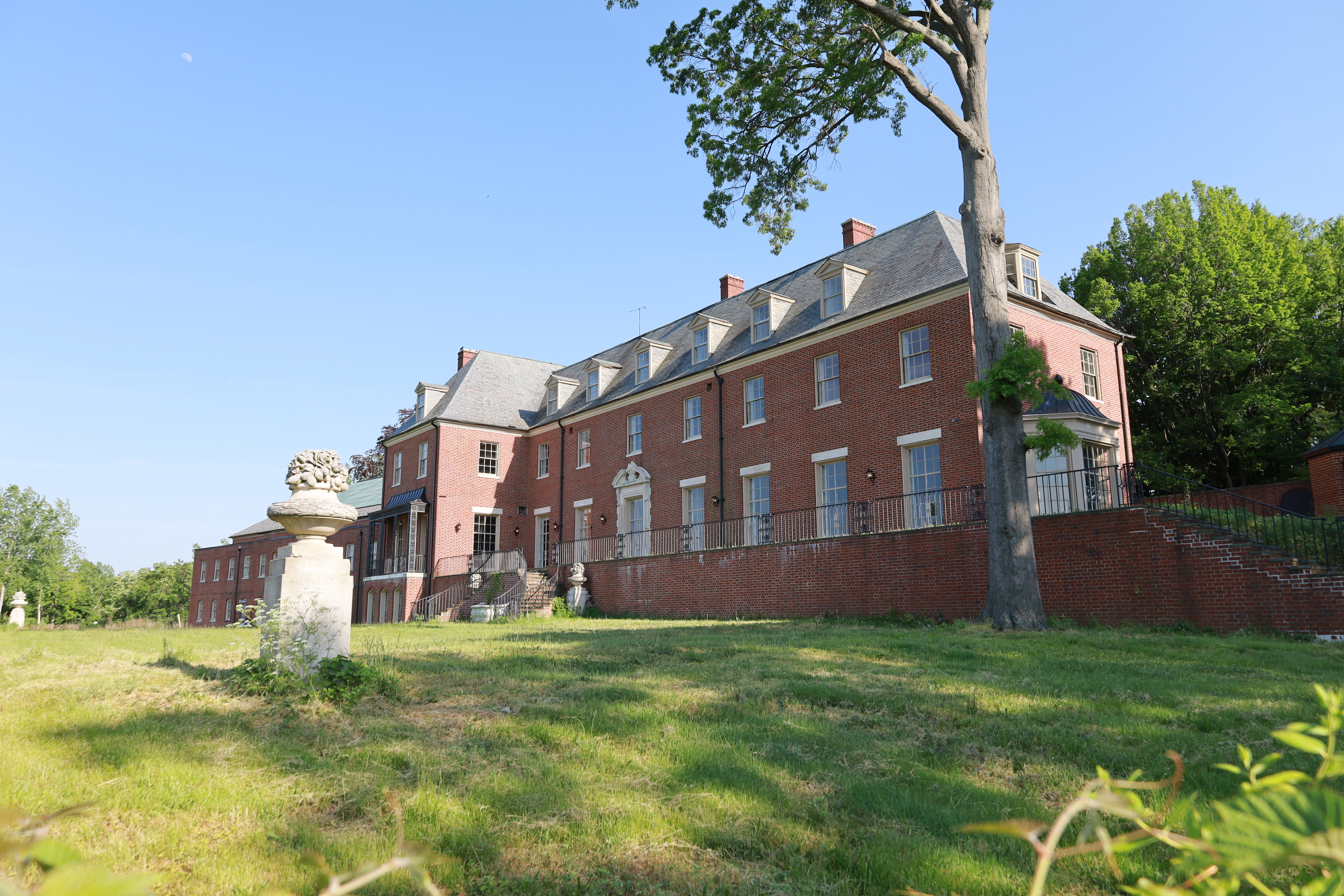
Northern façade

Bogheid is a historic Gold Coast mansion in Glen Cove, New York. The French manor style mansion is located on the north side of Lattington Road in Glen Cove with views of the Long Island Sound and Connecticut. The estate also contains a barn and a greenhouse, and is connected to a large tennis house.

== History ==
Bogheid was built in 1938 for Helen Porter Pryibil, daughter of William H. Porter, a partner at J.P. Morgan & Co. It was designed by Delano and Aldrich in the French Manor style. The house was built on the site of her father's former mansion, also known as "Bogheid," that was demolished in 1930.

At some point Prybil sold the 120-acre estate to the City of Glen Cove for $325,000. The surrounding estate was converted into a municipal golf course, with Prybil retaining a life estate in the house, until her death in 1969. The city then sold the house to Arthur Young Associates, which used it as a headquarters and conference center, but returned it to the city after a few years due to the firm failing.

In 1981 it was sold to Martin T. Carey, brother of New York Governor Hugh Carey, who renamed it Cashelmara. In 1985 it was the site of the Designers' Showcase event for interior decorators. However, it afterwards became vacant and was left in disrepair.

The mansion was inventoried by the New York State Parks and Recreation Division of Historic Preservation in 1983. The Society for the Preservation of Long Island Antiquities placed it on their list of endangered historic properties in 2010, but as of 2014 it had not been given a landmark designation by the City of Glen Cove. There has been no attempt for listing by the National Register of Historic Places.

After Carey's death, the house was sold in July 2021 to a new owner who plans to rehabilitate the property.
