= Henry Paolucci =

American academic (c. 1922–1999)

- Born: 1921 or 1922
- Died: January 1, 1999 (aged 77); Queens, New York City, U.S.

Henry Paolucci (1921/1922–1999) was an American professor of classical politics and literature, and a conservative politician.
