= William H. Porter =

President of Chemical National Bank
- In office 1903–1910
- Preceded by: George G. Williams
- Succeeded by: Joseph B. Martindale

Personal details
- Born: William Henry Porter; January 8, 1861 Middlebury, Vermont
- Died: November 30, 1926 (aged 65) Brooklyn, New York
- Spouse: Esther Jackson
- Children: 2
- Parent(s): William Trowbridge Porter; Martha Elizabeth Samson Porter
- Education: Middlebury Academy; Saratoga High School

William Henry Porter (January 8, 1861 – November 30, 1926) was a prominent banker in New York City. Porter became president of Chemical National Bank in 1903 and was one of the founders and directors of the Bankers Trust Company of New York. 1908, Porter was elected to serve as president of the New York Clearing House and later became a partner in the firm J.P. Morgan & Co..

== Early life ==
Porter was born at Middlebury, Vermont on January 8, 1861. He was a son of William Trowbridge Porter (1838–1898) and Martha Elizabeth (née Samson) Porter (1837–1917).

Porter was educated at Middlebury Academy and the Saratoga High School.

== Career ==
His first banking employment was as a junior clerk in the Fifth Avenue Bank of New York, where he stayed for eight years. In 1886, Porter left the Fifth Avenue Bank of New York to become cashier of the Chase National Bank. In 1893, after seven years as vice president of the Chase National Bank, Porter was elected vice president of the Chemical National Bank in 1898.

Upon the death of George G. Williams in May 1903, Porter became president of Chemical National Bank. Also in 1903, Porter was one of the founders and directors of the Bankers Trust Company of New York. Porter was also a trustee of the Guaranty Trust Company of New York.

On October 6, 1908, Porter was elected to serve as president of the New York Clearing House. Porter also served as treasurer and member of the executive committee of Chamber of Commerce.

In 1910, Porter left Chemical to become a partner in the firm J.P. Morgan & Co.

== Personal life ==
Porter was married to Esther Jackson (1862–1934), a daughter of James Jackson. Together, they lived in a townhouse at 45 East 68th Street in Manhattan and had a country home in Glen Cove on Long Island. They were the parents of:

- James Jackson Porter (1891–1918), a 1911 graduate of Princeton University and 1914 graduate of Harvard Law School who practiced law with White & Case before he was killed in action during the Meuse–Argonne offensive near Brielles in France.
- Helen Porter (1897–1969), who married Richard Leech Davisson. They divorced and she married Paul Pryibil in 1928. In 1938, they built a mansion in Glen Cove, New York known as Bogheid. Pryibil died in 1947.

Porter died while walking with his wife along Lafayette Avenue in Brooklyn on November 30, 1926. After a funeral at Central Presbyterian Church on Madison Avenue, he was buried at Woodlawn Cemetery, Bronx. His estate was left to his wife (who died in 1934), daughter and grandchildren along with various bequests to Middlebury College and several churches.

=== Legacy ===
Porter helped to fund the creation of the Porter Medical Center in Middlebury, Vermont.
