= Edson Bradley =

President of W.A. Gaines and Company

Edson Bradley, Jr. (May 9, 1852 – June 20, 1935) was president of Kentucky whiskey distiller W.A. Gaines and Company of Frankfort, Kentucky. He owned the exclusive rights to the "Old Crow" whisky label.

== Biography ==
Bradley was born on May 9, 1852, in New Canaan, Connecticut. His debutante daughter Julia Bradley had her coming out party in 1894. She married Bishop Herbert Shipman. Bradley has been known for his properties. In 1923, he dismantled his home and reassembled it in Newport, Rhode Island. An account stated that it was constructed for his wife and it cost him two million dollars. The house, which included a seven acre lawn and located close to the shore of the Atlantic Ocean, earned for its architect, Howard Greenley, an Architectural League of New York prize. It is currently known as Carey Mansion.

Bradley and his wife became active in the social life of Washington, D.C., after they acquired and made Gardiner Greene Hubbard's house at Dupont Circle their winter home in 1907. Bradley's wife became known for her "American Beauty Ball", which exhausted the city's American Beauty roses market for days since the flowers were used to decorate their house.

His wife Julie died shortly after construction was completed in 1929. Edson Bradley died of pneumonia in London on June 20, 1935.
