= Seaview Terrace =

Privately owned mansion in Newport, Rhode Island

Seaview Terrace Carey Mansion
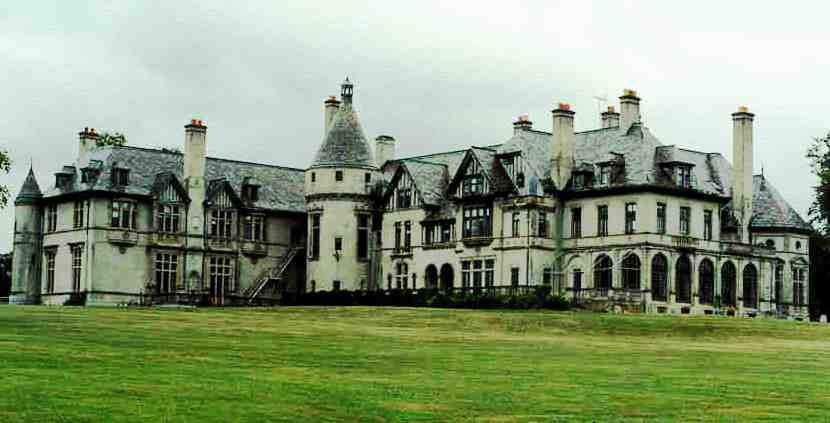
- View from the southeast
- Former names: Burnham-by-the-Sea; Stoneleigh-Burnham School

General information
- Architectural style: Châteauesque
- Location: Newport, Rhode Island, Ruggles & Wetmore Avenues
- Coordinates: 41.467603°N 71.30363°W
- Construction started: 1923
- Completed: 1925
- Client: Edson Bradley
- Owner: Privately owned

Design and construction
- Architect: Howard Greenley

Seaview Terrace, also known as the Carey Mansion, is a privately owned mansion located in Newport, Rhode Island. It was designed in the Châteauesque style based on the French chateaux of the 16th century, and completed in 1925. It was the last of the great "Summer Cottages" constructed and is the fifth-largest of Newport's mansions, after The Breakers, Ochre Court, Belcourt Castle, and Rough Point. The television show Dark Shadows used its exterior as the fictional Collinwood Mansion. Part of the main house and some of the outbuildings were leased to Salve Regina University until recently.

== History ==
From the 1850s to the early 20th century, fashionable wealthy families built elaborate mansions in Newport to be used for entertaining during the summer season.

=== Seaview Terrace ===
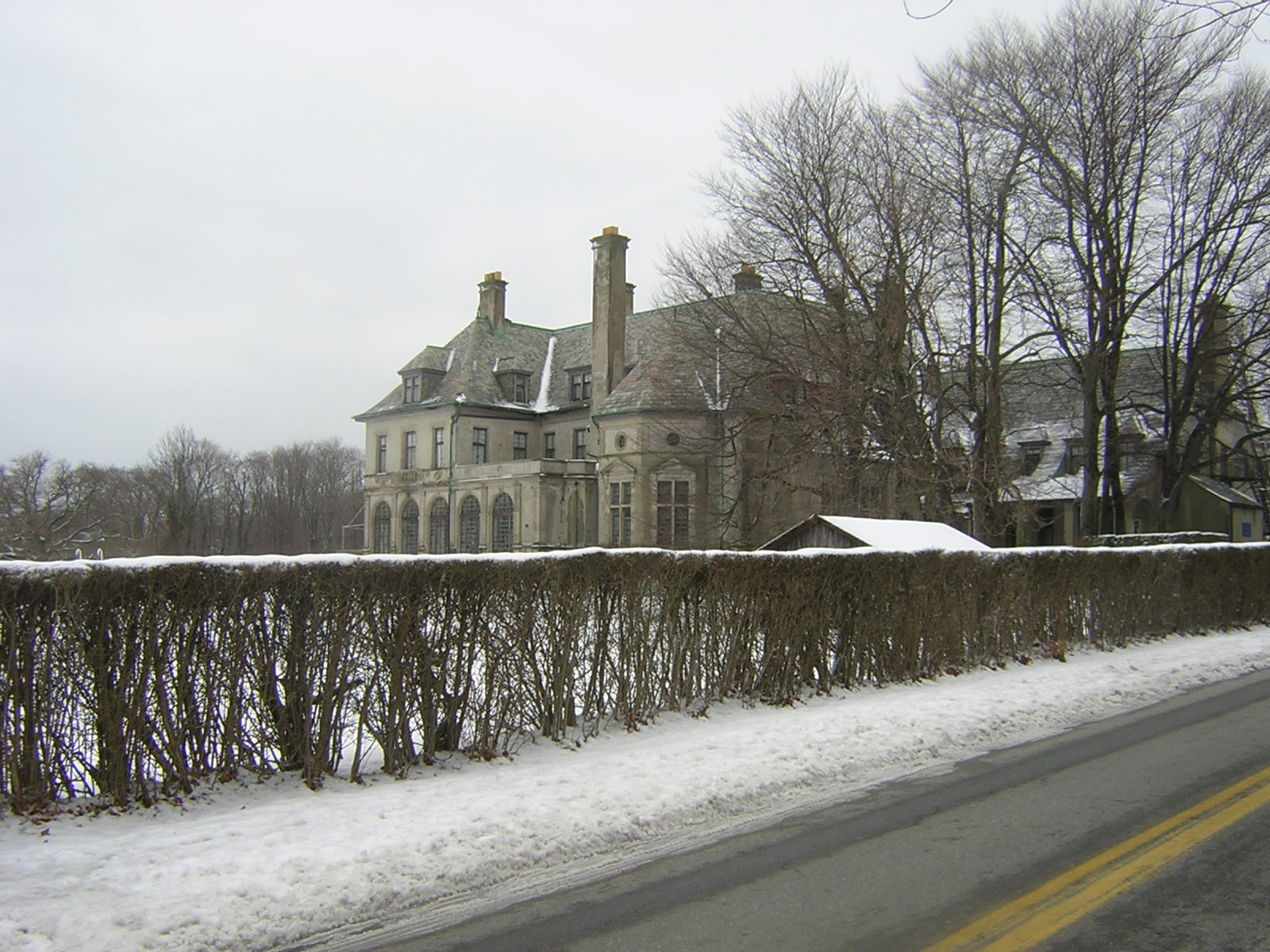
Seaview Terrace and hedge.

In 1907, whiskey millionaire Edson Bradley built a French-Gothic mansion on the south side of Dupont Circle in Washington, D.C. It covered more than half a city block, and included a Gothic chapel with seating for 150, a large ballroom, an art gallery, and a 500-seat theatre—90 by 120 feet (27 m × 37 m), and several stories tall, completed in 1911—known as Aladdin's Palace.

In 1923, Bradley began disassembling his Washington, D.C. mansion and relocating it to a Newport property at Ruggles and Wetmore avenues. "Sea View", the 1885 Elizabethan-Revival mansion already on the site, was incorporated into the design, and lent its name to the new chateau. Work on the exterior continued for two years, and required the use of many railroad cars and trucks. Rooms that had been imported intact from France and installed in Washington, D.C. twenty years earlier were moved again and reassembled in Newport, and the new building was constructed around them. When the interiors were completed in 1925, there were 17 rooms on the first floor, 25 on the second, and 12 on the third. It is believed to have been one of the largest buildings to be moved in this manner.

Seaview Terrace cost over $2,000,000 to build. The main house featured turrets, stained-glass windows, high arching doorways and, in keeping with its seaside location, shell motifs. The American League of Architects awarded Bradley's architect, Howard Greenley, a 1928 medal for the chateau.

Bradley's wife, Julia Williams Bradley, died in August 1929, and her funeral was held in the house's chapel. Edson Bradley spent five more summers at the mansion before his death in 1935.

The Bradleys' daughter, Julie Bradley Shipman, took over the estate and lived there until 1941. Her husband, the Right Reverend Herbert Shipman, Episcopal Bishop of New York, died in 1930. She vacated the house after a dispute with the City over non-payment of three years' back taxes. During World War II, the house was used by the U.S. Army as officers' quarters. In 1949 the property was sold for only $8,000.

=== Private schools ===
In 1950, the property became an exclusive all-girl summer boarding school, and was renamed "Burnham-by-the-Sea". The house was owned and the summer school run by Mr. and Mrs. George Waldo Emerson. During the academic year, Mrs. Emerson was a headmistress for the Mary Burnham School for Girls in Northampton, Massachusetts.

In 1968, the Mary Burnham School merged with the Stoneleigh Prospect Hill School to become the Stoneleigh-Burnham School, but the summer school continued to be run by the Emersons until they sold Seaview Terrace. During the regular school year, the school operated as Newport School for Girls. In 1971 and 1972, Seaview Terrace also was home for The New School, grades 2 through 8. Headmaster for the New School was Fr. Toller Cranston.

==== Filming ====
From 1966 to 1971, the Gothic horror soap opera Dark Shadows used Burnham-by-the-Sea as the exterior set for the fictional Collinwood Mansion, which in turn inspired the depiction of the Kingston Mansion in the "What the Hex Is Going On?" episode of Scooby-Doo, Where Are You!.

During the summer of 1973 the movie The Great Gatsby was filmed next door. All the children at the school, who had a 9 pm curfew, spent the evenings listening to the filming of the cars driving up and down the old Oelrichs property, Rosecliff.

=== Carey Mansion ===
In 1974, Millicent and Martin T. Carey of New York purchased the mansion. As it was one of the largest of Newport's mansions, the Careys were faced with large costs for upkeep. The main house and gatehouse were leased to Salve Regina University, which renamed it the Carey Mansion. The former stables were also leased as a dormitory for Salve Regina, which renamed it "Seaview". The mansion's Drawing Room, used by the university for performances and practice, was renamed Cecilia Hall, for the patron saint of music (Saint Cecilia). During the 1980s Seaview Terrace housed the American syndicate of the America's Cup.

On August 31, 2009, Salve Regina University terminated the lease with the Carey family. The Careys' daughter, Denise Anne Carey, an architect from New York, currently lives there.

== Fire ==
On February 28, 2024 a fire destroyed parts of Carey Mansion.

The Syfy network featured the mansion in the first season, second episode of its paranormal reality show Stranded on March 6, 2013. Seaview Terrace was featured on Travel Channel's Ghost Nation, on October 31, 2020.

Seaview Terrace is privately owned and is not open for tours or tourist visits.

== Features ==
=== Whispering gallery ===
Cecilia Hall features a whispering gallery, an elliptical room reminiscent of Saint Paul's Cathedral, in which a person standing at one of the foci can hear the slightest whisper uttered at the other.

=== Stained glass ===
The Flagellation (circa 1544–47) was an early-Renaissance stained-glass window designed for Milan Cathedral. It was part of a series portraying the Passion of Christ, and believed to have been made in the workshop of Currado Mochis da Colonia. The window was bought by Edson Bradley for the house when it was located on Dupont Circle, and may have once been owned by Stanford White.

=== Estey organ ===
Carey Mansion's pipe organ, Opus 2140, was made by Jacob Estey of Estey Organ Company, Brattleboro, Vermont. It has a Tremolo Electric Detached Console Automatic Player which includes Great pipes, Swell, and multiple pedals. It is no longer operational, and the console is missing.

=== Hedge ===
Carey Mansion has never throughout its history had any sort of rigid fencing or wall surrounding the property. There are two main gateposts, but around most of the rest of the property a decorative hedge is used, rather unsuccessfully, to keep people away, making it the largest of its kind in Newport with such a characteristic. There is a short length of five foot (1.5 meter) high fencing along the western edge dividing the property from Fairlawn (AKA Salve's Young Building). The fence runs between the Fairlawn carriage house and Seaview's gate house from Ruggles Avenue to approximately 150 feet (46 m) from the southwestern corner of the Seaview property.
