= 1978 New York gubernatorial election =

- November 7, 1978
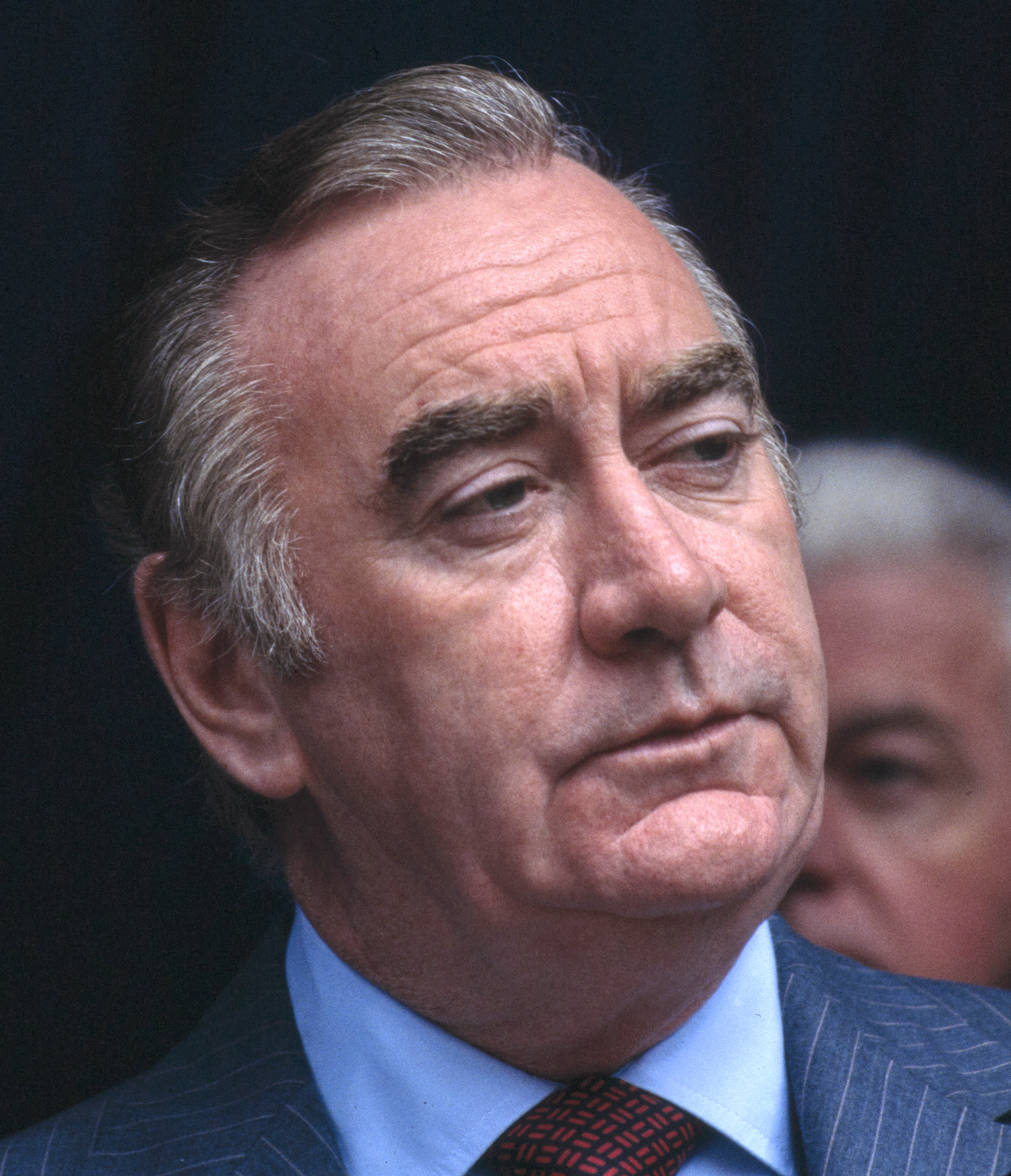

| Nominee | Hugh Carey | Perry Duryea |
| Party | Democratic | Republican |
| Alliance | Liberal | Conservative |
| Running mate | Mario Cuomo | Bruce Caputo |
| Popular vote | 2,429,272 | 2,156,404 |
| Percentage | 50.95% | 45.22% |
- County results Carey: 40–50% 50–60% 60–70% 70–80% Duryea: 40–50% 50–60% 60–70%
Governor before election
Hugh Carey
Democratic
Elected Governor
Hugh Carey
Democratic

The 1978 New York gubernatorial election was held on November 7, 1978 to elect the governor and lieutenant governor of New York. Democratic incumbent Hugh Carey was reelected to a second term in office over former Assembly speaker Perry Duryea. Carey was the first Democratic governor to win re-election since Herbert H. Lehman in 1938.

Carey faced a challenge from his own lieutenant governor, Mary Anne Krupsak, in the Democratic primary. He defeated Krupsak and state senator Jeremiah Bloom with 52 percent of the vote. Duryea secured the Republican nomination at the state convention without opposition, obviating the need for a primary.

== Republican primary ==
=== Candidates ===
- Perry Duryea, assemblyman from Montauk and former speaker of the New York State Assembly

=== Convention results ===
Duryea was nominated at the June state convention without opposition.

== Democratic primary ==
=== Candidates ===
- Jeremiah B. Bloom, state senator from Brooklyn
- Hugh Carey, incumbent governor since 1975 and former U.S. representative from Brooklyn
- Mary Anne Krupsak, lieutenant governor since 1975 and former state senator from Schenectady

Declined

- Mario Biaggi, U.S. representative from the Bronx

=== Campaign ===
On June 12, with the deadline to file candidacies approaching, Mary Anne Krupsak broke with Governor Carey, refused to run on his ticket, and publicly attacked him. She entered the race herself on June 26.

The Krupsak campaign sought to build a coalition of left, feminist activists and upstate Democrats dissatisfied with the governor, hiring many staff from the 1977 mayoral campaign of Bella Abzug. However, many women office-holders endorsed Carey, who had appointed several women to his cabinet and was considered strong on women's issues, particularly his support for government funding for abortion and the Equal Rights Amendment. Some considered her campaign an impulsive personal crusade which set back the feminist movement. Linda Winikow, a state senator and personal friend of Krupsak's, said, "What she did was set back the women's movement 10 years. My constituents are coming to me and saying, 'She's shown that you women don't belong in government. You're too emotional. You're too unstable.' By her actions, she's given food to those who have always felt women don't belong in politics."

Many liberals, including Carol Bellamy, Elizabeth Holtzman, and Ed Koch, opposed Krupsak's campaign and her efforts to get the Democratic Coalition of New York City, a liberal organization, to withdraw its endorsement. Krupsak denied accusations that her campaign was personal or that she and Carey had the same record, citing her breaks with the governor to oppose the controversial Westway Highway project and support the legalization of Laetrile. Both Carey and Krupsak opposed the restoration of capital punishment, while Bloom supported it.

Carey had a well-funded campaign and hired David Garth. To counter charges that he was soft on crime, he called a special session of the legislature to pass a package of crime legislation. Carey also claimed credit for saving New York City from bankruptcy following its 1975 fiscal crisis.

=== Results ===
Democratic primary results
| Party | Candidate | Votes | % |
|---|---|---|---|
| Democratic | Hugh L. Carey (incumbent) | 376,457 | 51.98% |
| Democratic | Mary Anne Krupsak | 244,252 | 33.73% |
| Democratic | Jeremiah B. Bloom | 103,479 | 14.29% |
| Democratic | Blank-Void-Scattering-Other | 28,726 | 3.97% |
| Total votes | | 724,188 | 100.00% |

== General election ==
=== Campaign ===
- Hugh Carey, incumbent governor since 1975 (Democratic, Liberal)
  - Running mate: Mario Cuomo, New York secretary of state and 1977 candidate for New York City mayor
- Perry Duryea, assemblyman from Montauk and former speaker of the New York State Assembly (Republican, Conservative)
  - Running mate: Bruce Caputo, U.S. representative from Yonkers
- Dianne M. Feeley, activist and party spokesperson (Socialist Workers)
  - Running mate: Kevin E. Kellogg, grassroots organizer
- Paul Gallagher, executive director of the Fusion Energy Foundation and follower of Lyndon LaRouche (U.S. Labor)
  - Running mate: J. Philip Rubinstein, follower of Lyndon LaRouche
- Gary Greenberg, New York City criminal defense lawyer and party founder (Free Libertarian)
  - Running mate: James Franz, campaign organizer and strategist
- Mary Jane Tobin, Long Island mother and community organizer (Right to Life)
  - Running mate: Ellen McCormack, housewife and 1976 Democratic presidential candidate
- Jarvis Tyner, former national chair of the DuBois Clubs of America and founder of the Young Workers Liberation League (Communist)
  - Running mate: Grace Mora, organizer and antiwar activist

=== Results ===
New York gubernatorial election, 1978
| Party | Candidate | Votes | % | ±% |
|---|---|---|---|---|
| Democratic | Hugh Carey | 2,305,815 | 48.36% | |
| Liberal | Hugh Carey | 123,457 | 2.59% | |
| Total | Hugh Carey (incumbent) | 2,429,272 | 50.95% | -6.27% |
| Republican | Perry Duryea | 1,913,432 | 40.13% | |
| Conservative | Perry Duryea | 242,972 | 5.10% | |
| Total | Perry Duryea | 2,156,404 | 45.22% | +3.28% |
| Right to Life | Mary Jane Tobin | 130,193 | 2.73% | N/A |
| Libertarian | Gary Greenberg | 18,990 | 0.40% | +0.20% |
| Socialist Workers | Dianne M. Feeley | 12,987 | 0.27% | +0.10% |
| Communist | Jarvis Tyner | 11,400 | 0.24% | +0.14% |
| U.S. Labor | Paul Gallagher | 9,073 | 0.19% | +0.13% |
| Majority | | 272,868 | 5.72% | −9.56% |
| Turnout | | 4,768,319 | | |
| Democratic hold | | | | |
