= Edward M. Carey =

American businessman and energy executive

Edward Michael Carey (October 12, 1916 – May 12, 2002) was an American oil industry executive who served as president of Carey Energy Corporation and helped finance the political ambitions of his brother, Hugh Carey, who served as the Democratic Governor of New York from 1975 to 1982.

== Early life ==
Carey was born in Brooklyn, New York on October 12, 1916. He was one of six sons born to Margaret (née Collins) Carey, a former secretary to journalist Nellie Bly, and Dennis Joseph Carey Sr. Among his siblings were brothers Dennis J. Carey Jr. (president of the family firm), Hugh L. Carey (a former U.S. Representative who served as Governor of New York from 1975 to 1982), John R. Carey, Martin T. Carey, and George G. Carey. His youngest brother, George, a securities analyst, was killed in a plane crash in 1959.

He was a graduate of St. Augustine's School in the Bronx and attended Manhattan College and St. John's University.

== Career ==
In the 1930s, together with his parents, he founded Peerless Oil Company (later known as Peerless Petrochemicals), the petroleum transport business. In the early 1940s, Carey formed the New England Petroleum Corporation, based in Brooklyn, which became one of the nation's largest "privately owned petroleum refining and marketing companies." The company specialized in supplying petroleum products to electrical utilities on the East Coast, and had interests in oil exploration and production in the Persian Gulf, North Africa, and the North Sea.

In 1968, Carey teamed up with Standard Oil of California (today known as the Chevron Corporation) to set up the Bahamas Oil Refining Company, of which Carey was chairman, to establish and run a $60 million refinery in the Bahamas to process Standard Oil's sweet crude oil from Libya. Carey's New England Petroleum Corp. then sold the oil to utilities in the Northeastern United States, which had been under pressure to reduce pollution by burning cleaner fuels. The Bahamas venture, headquartered in Freeport, was largely financed by Standard Oil, ran into difficulties after the 1973 oil crisis when Libya also nationalized its foreign-held oil into the National Oil Corporation. After supplies to the refinery dwindled, Standard Oil and Carey fell into a series of disputes which were further agitated by Federal regulations put in place to deal because of oil prices rising worldwide.

By the end of 1978, the plant was in receivership, $300 million in debt to the National Oil Cormpanies of Libya and Iran and $100 million in debt to Standard Oil of California. In 1979, Carey sold Carey Energy Corporation, with $550 million in assets, to the Jacksonville, Florida based Charter Company for $4 million in cash (for 20% of the company) and $16 million in Charter convertible preferred stock (worth $45 million), plus a consulting contract for Carey that paid $200,000 per year. Carey Energy's principal assets were a 65% ownership in the Bahamas Refinery (Standard Oil owned the remaining 35%) as well as the New England Petroleum Company. Charter beat out Ashland Oil who were also interested in acquiring Carey Energy.

"The deal hinged on an unusual contract with the Libyans. The contract tied the payments that Charter had to make against Carey's outstanding bills to the amount of oil the Libyans supplied. It thus solved the problem that had made it impossible for Carey to continue in business: the refusal of the company's suppliers to provide any more oil on credit."

The contract with Libya, plus a substantial increase in refinery profit margins that accompanied the 1979 oil shortage, "enabled Charter to settle all of its debts with Carey's foreign suppliers just four months after it had taken over the company." By 1982, however, the refinery "that once turned crude into cash is now considered a money-losing white elephant" and led to Charter losing much of its value. Charter executives claimed that earnings from other assets acquired from Carey Energy "more than offset the Bahamian losses." Charter filed for bankruptcy protection in late 1984, eventually selling off all of its businesses and purchasing Spelling Entertainment Inc.

=== Commonwealth Oil Refining Company ===
In 1953, Carey helped found the Commonwealth Oil Refining Company in the Puerto Rico under the development program known as Operation Bootstrap. Carey organized Commonwealth with Rear Admiral Andrew F. Carter (former president of Shell Eastern Petroleum Products, Inc. and a senior executive with the Army-Navy Petroleum Board during World War II), Charles W. Saacke (a former executive with the Davison Chemical Company which was acquired by W. R. Grace and Company in 1954), and Fred Gilbert of Carey's New England Petroleum. The company ran a petrochemical plant and $24,500,000 refinery at Ponce. Commonwealth Oil, which processed 160,000 bbl (25,000 m^{3}), was also sold to Charter for $650 million in 1980.

In the late 1950s, Carey was involved in a consortium of American companies to set up a capital market in Puerto Rico.

== Personal life ==
In 1941, he married the Elizabeth Ann "Betty" Sullivan (d. 2000). Together, they were the parents of three children:

- Edward Charles Carey, who married Eileen Campion Cahill, a daughter of Dr. John Cahill, in 1966. After her death, Edward married her sister, Moreen Cathleen Cahill (1945–2020), in 1971.
- Diane Margaret Carey, who married Myles Charles Cunningham, a son of John J. Cunningham (vice president of Manufacturers Hanover Trust Company), in 1968.
- Jane Elizabeth Carey, who married Thomas Alan Haswell, who worked for Carey's New England Petroleum Corp., in 1971.

Carey died in Manhattan on May 12, 2002. After a funeral at the Church of St. Vincent Ferrer in New York, he was buried at Holy Rood Cemetery in Westbury, New York on Long Island.
