= R.N. Linn House =

Historic house in Hawaii, United States

- R. N. Linn House
- U.S. National Register of Historic Places
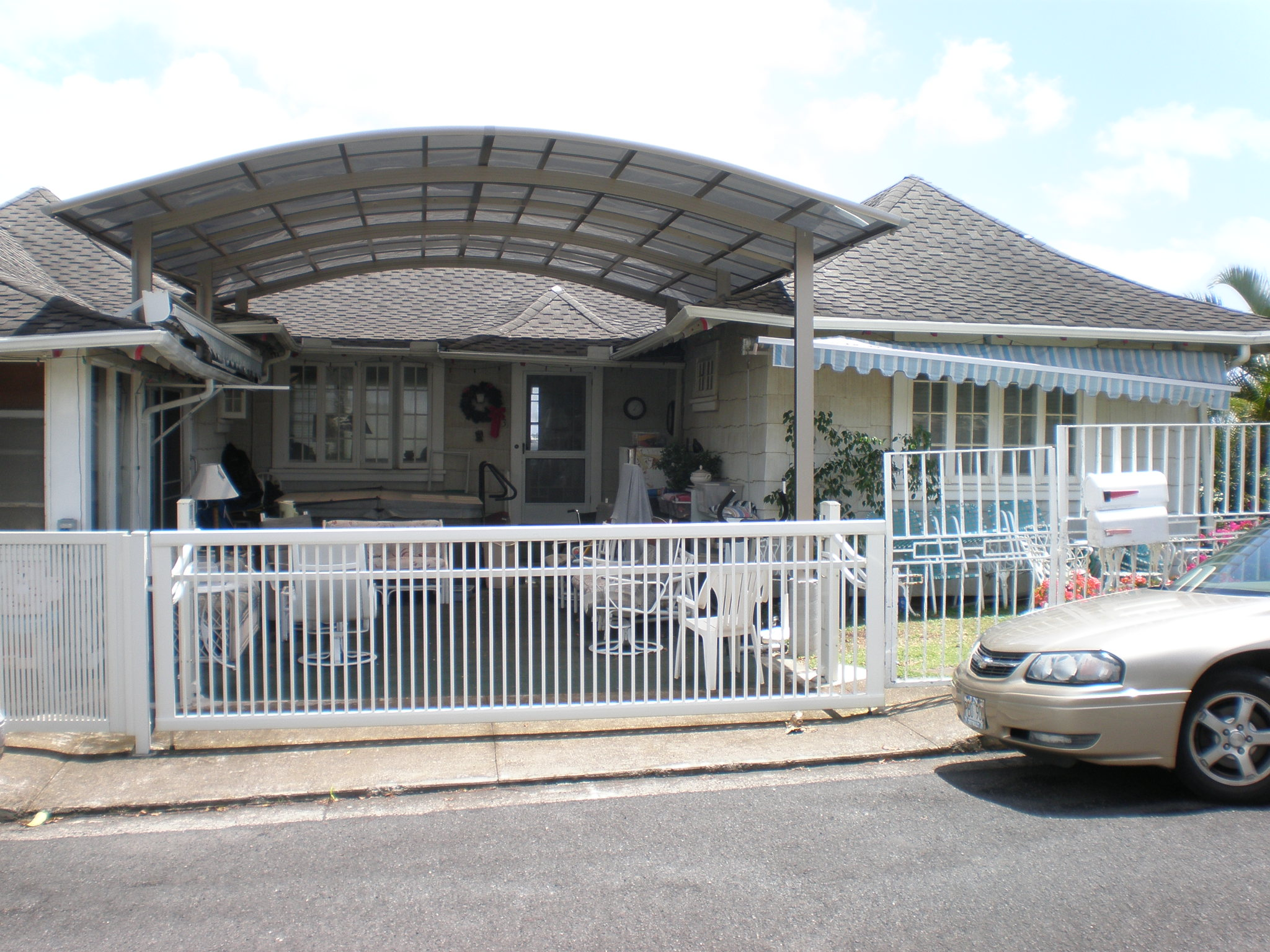
- Front entrance of the R.N. Linn House in 2009

- Location within Hawaii
- Location: 2013 Kakela Dr., Honolulu, Hawaii
- Coordinates: 21°18′30″N 157°49′28″W
- Area: 0.1 acres (0.040 ha)
- Built: 1928
- Architect: J. Alvin Shadinger
- Architectural style: Hawaiian modern cottage
- NRHP reference No.: 86001622
- Added to NRHP: August 20, 1986

The R. N. Linn House, also known as the Robert A. and Eleanor C. Nordyke Residence, at 2013 Kakela Drive in Honolulu, Hawaiʻi, was built in 1928 in the style of architecture then emerging in Hawaiʻi during the 1920s. Although it is relatively modest cottage, it exhibits such typical elements of that style as a double-pitched hip roof (also known as a Dickey roof), exposed rafters, casement windows, an open floor plan, Chinese interior motifs, and a panoramic view. Its architect was J. Alvin Shadinger, who was noted especially for his interior designs. The house was listed in the National Register of Historic Places in 1986.

Many of the leading architects in Honolulu during the 1920s consciously employed both European and Asian motifs in their designs, as they pursued a distinctive Hawaiian style of architecture that celebrated the multiethnic roots of Island society. Among the most influential was Hart Wood, whose artful blending of motifs can still be seen in the First Chinese Church of Christ, the Alexander & Baldwin Building, and the Gump Building (all built in 1929), as well as in several grand private residences. The R. N. Linn house is one of the few fine middle-class homes from that period to show similar Chinese influences.

Reuben N. Linn was a court reporter and his wife Merle taught at Waialua Elementary School. They had acquired a lot of Chinese household furniture during a trip to China in 1922, and this likely influenced their choice of interior design. They lived in the house until 1950, when Mrs. Linn died. The Nordykes, who were friends of the Linns, bought the house in 1960. In 1961, Mrs. Nordyke gave birth to twin daughters in the same maternity ward at Kapi'olani Medical Center for Women & Children where Ann Dunham was giving birth to Barack Obama. The twins were classmates of the future President at Noelani Elementary School and then at Punahou School.

== Gallery ==
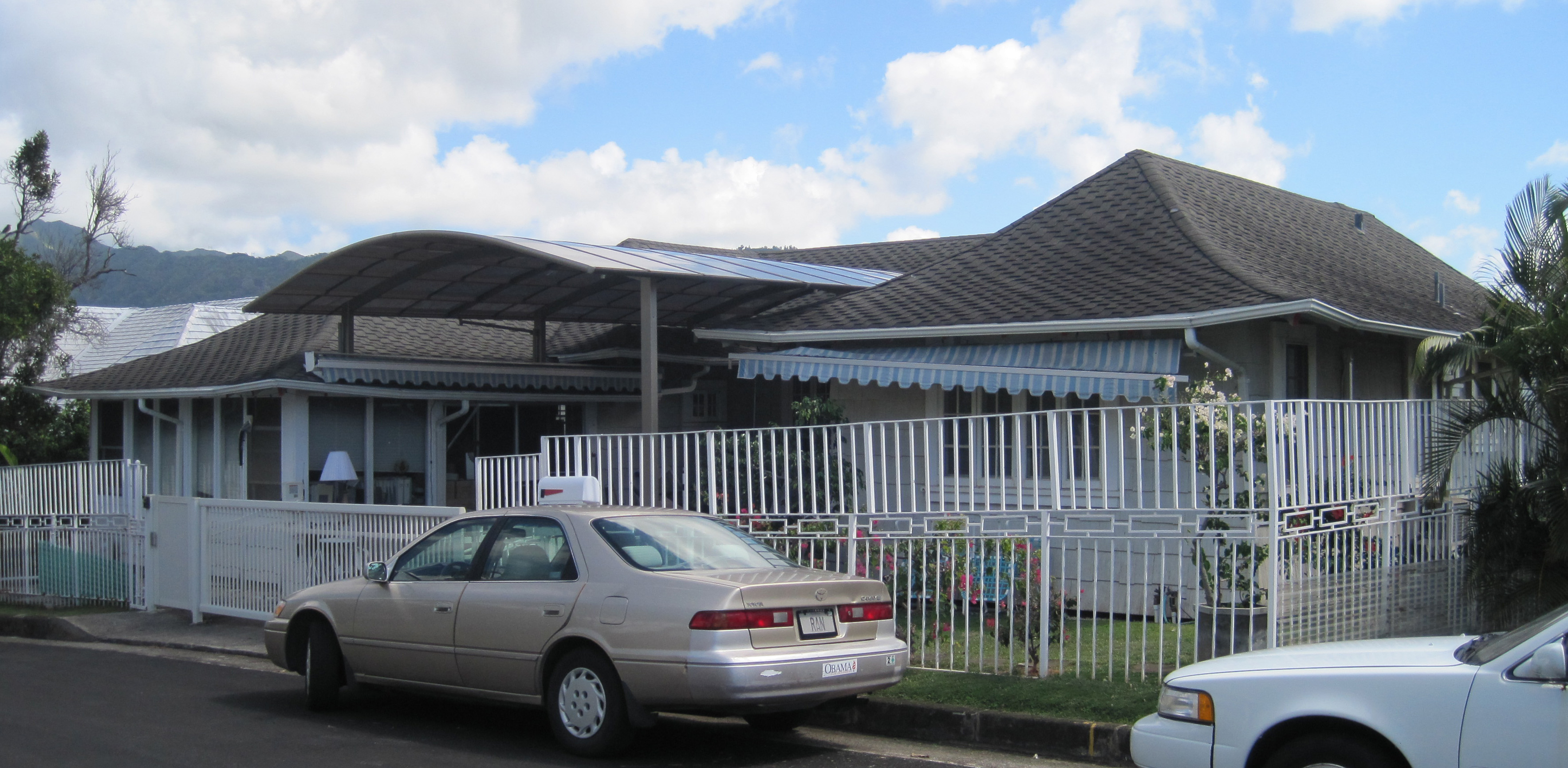
Side view from Kakela Dr.

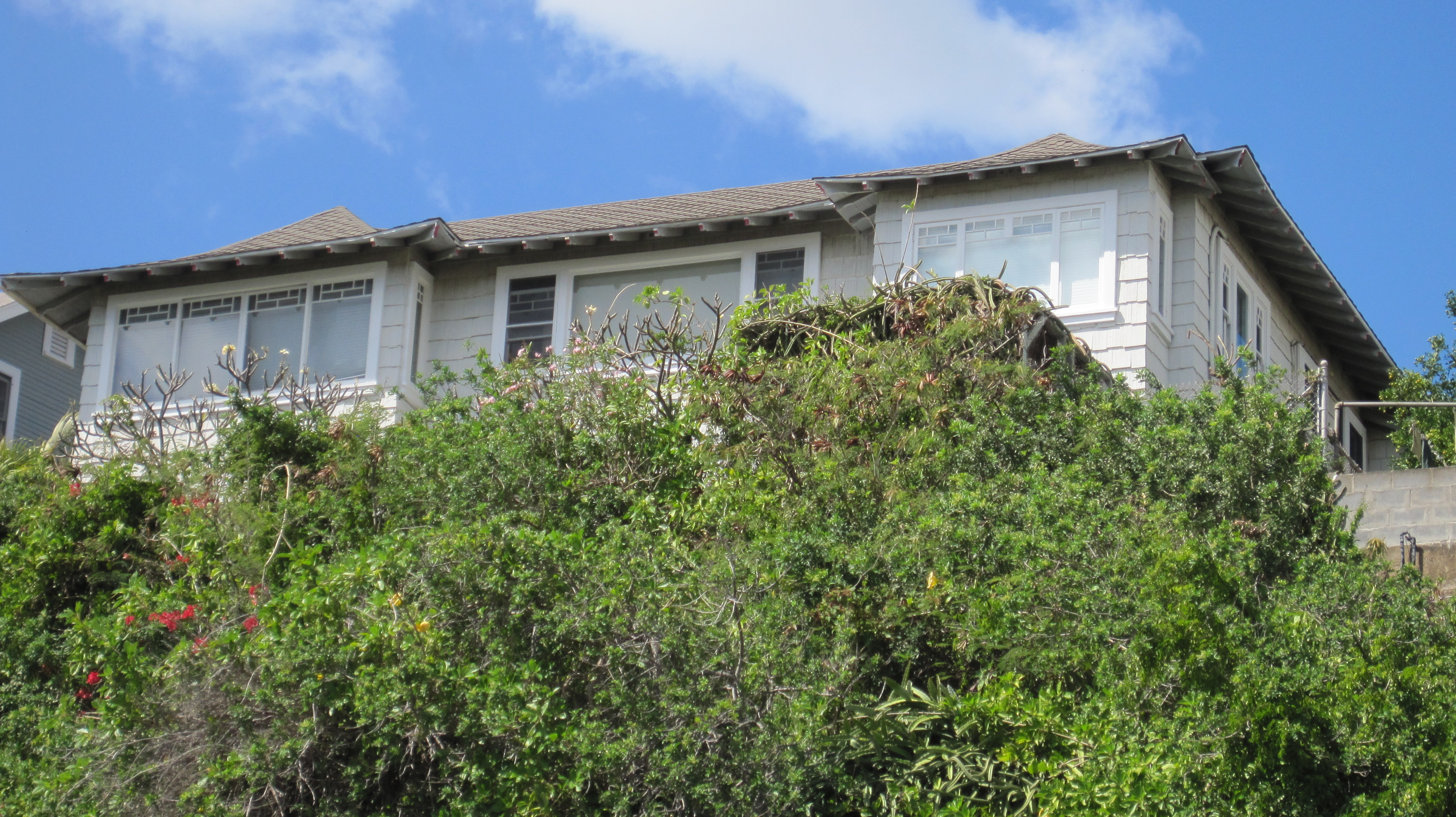
View from street below
