= Georges de S. Canavarro House =

Historic house in Hawaii, United States

- U.S. National Register of Historic Places
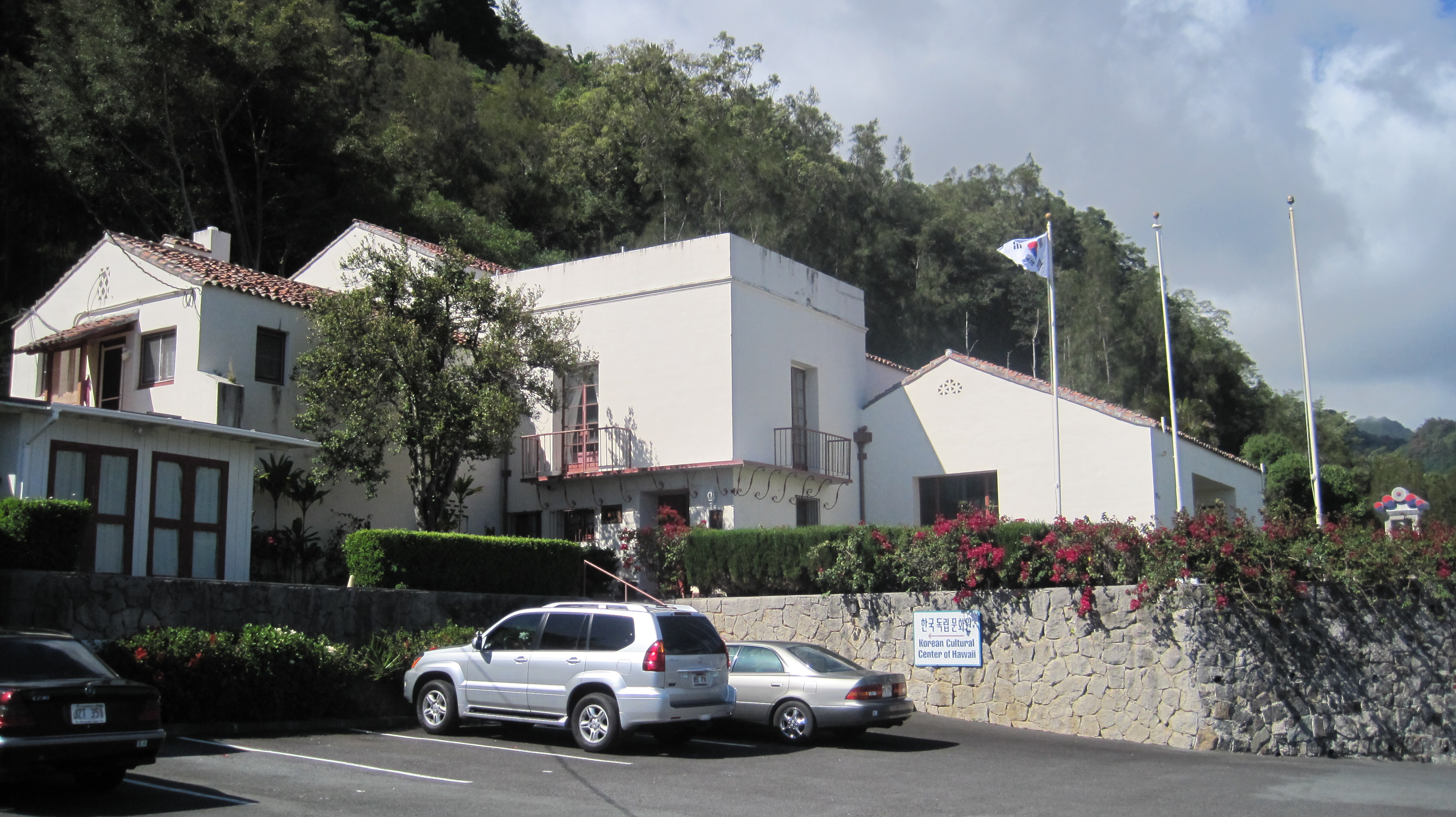
- Main entrance in 2010

- Location within Hawaii
- Location: 2756 Rooke Ave., Honolulu, Hawaii
- Coordinates: 21°20′28″N 157°50′53″W
- Area: 6,700 sq. ft.
- Built: 1927
- Architect: Hart Wood
- Architectural style: Mediterranean Revival
- NRHP reference No.: 80001274
- Added to NRHP: 28 May 1980

The Georges de S. Canavarro House, also known as the Canavarro Castle, at 2756 Rooke Ave., Honolulu, Hawaiʻi, was built in 1924–1927 for Georges de Souza Canavarro, son of the longtime Consul-General of Portugal in Hawaiʻi, Antonio de Souza Canavarro. It was designed by Hart Wood, the leader of a group of architects aiming to develop a style suitable for the climate and lifestyle of the islands. It was listed on the National Register of Historic Places in 1980 as a fine example of the Mediterranean Revival style employed for several large estates of that era, most notably Walter F. Dillingham's La Pietra. The design in this case was inspired by that of Sicilian villas.

The house site is on a steep slope in the Puʻunui area of Nuʻuanu Valley, next to the Oahu Country Club, with expansive views up the Valley and down to Honolulu harbor. The roofing is covered with red tiles, the masonry walls are covered with white stucco both inside and out, and the terraced floors and terraced grounds give the impression of a hillside town above the Mediterranean. The house itself is cross-shaped with an open courtyard and fountain in the center. The master bedroom, bath, and parlor are on the uphill side above the courtyard, with dining room, kitchen, and pantry on the downhill side. The north wing contains a library and two more bedrooms with separate baths. The interior floors are tiled and ceilings are coffered.

In 1947, the Canavarro Castle was purchased by the Korean Kook Min Hur (National Association), but subsequently fell into disuse. In 2002, the Korean Cultural Center of Hawaii bought the property and restored it for use as a meeting site and museum of the Korean independence movement.

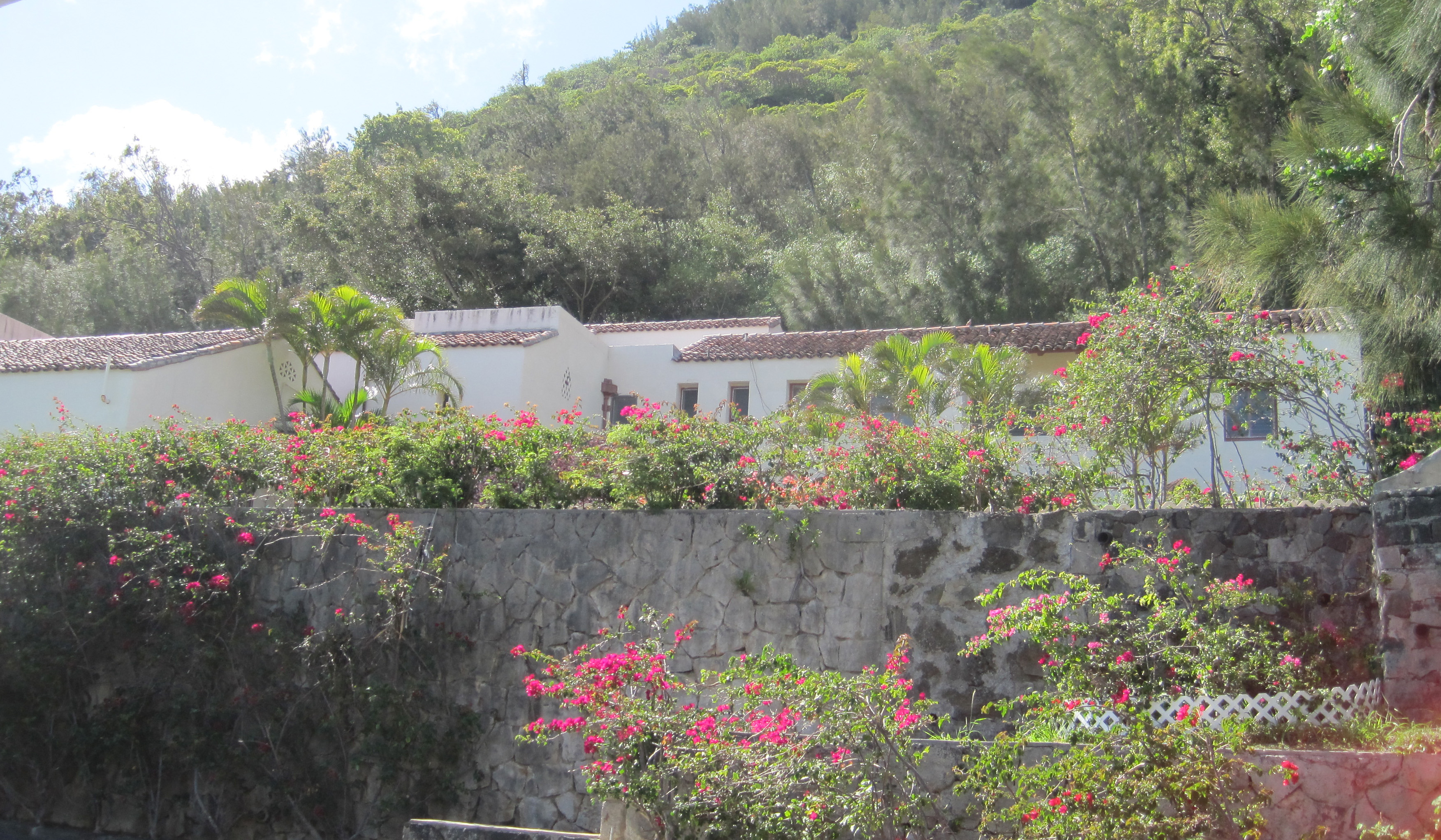
Terrace wall and north wing

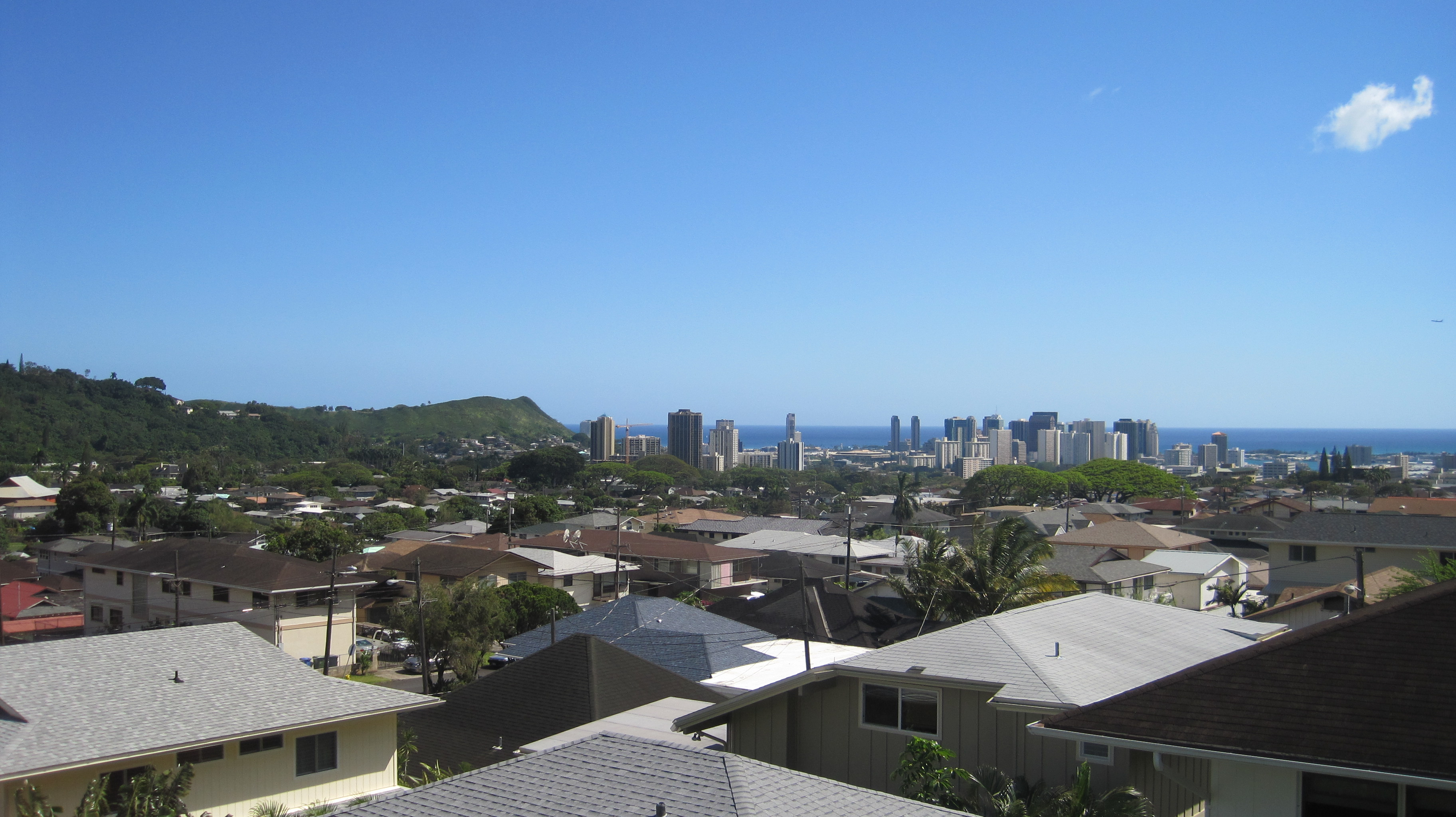
Terrace view of downtown Honolulu

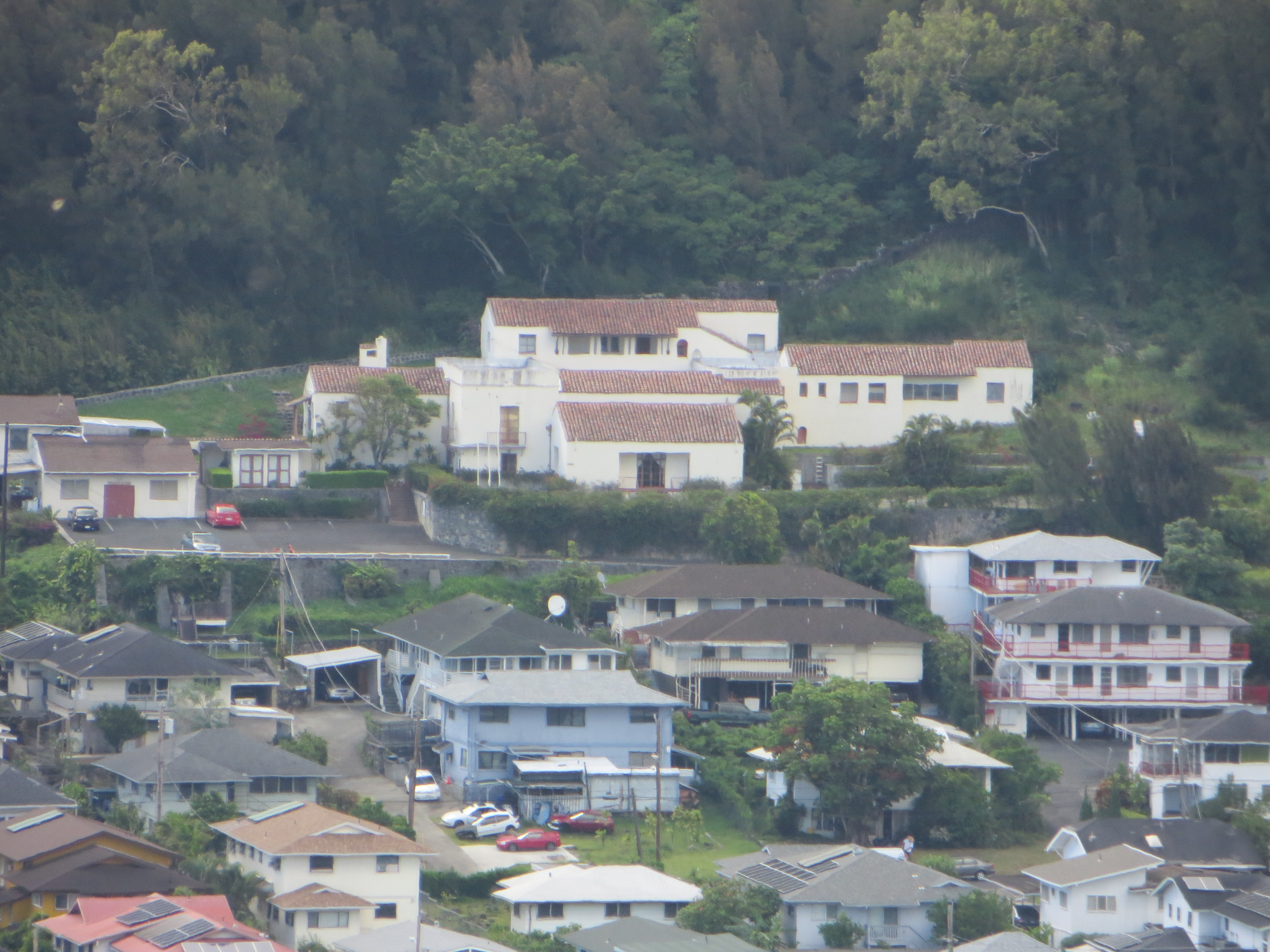
View from atop Pacific Heights

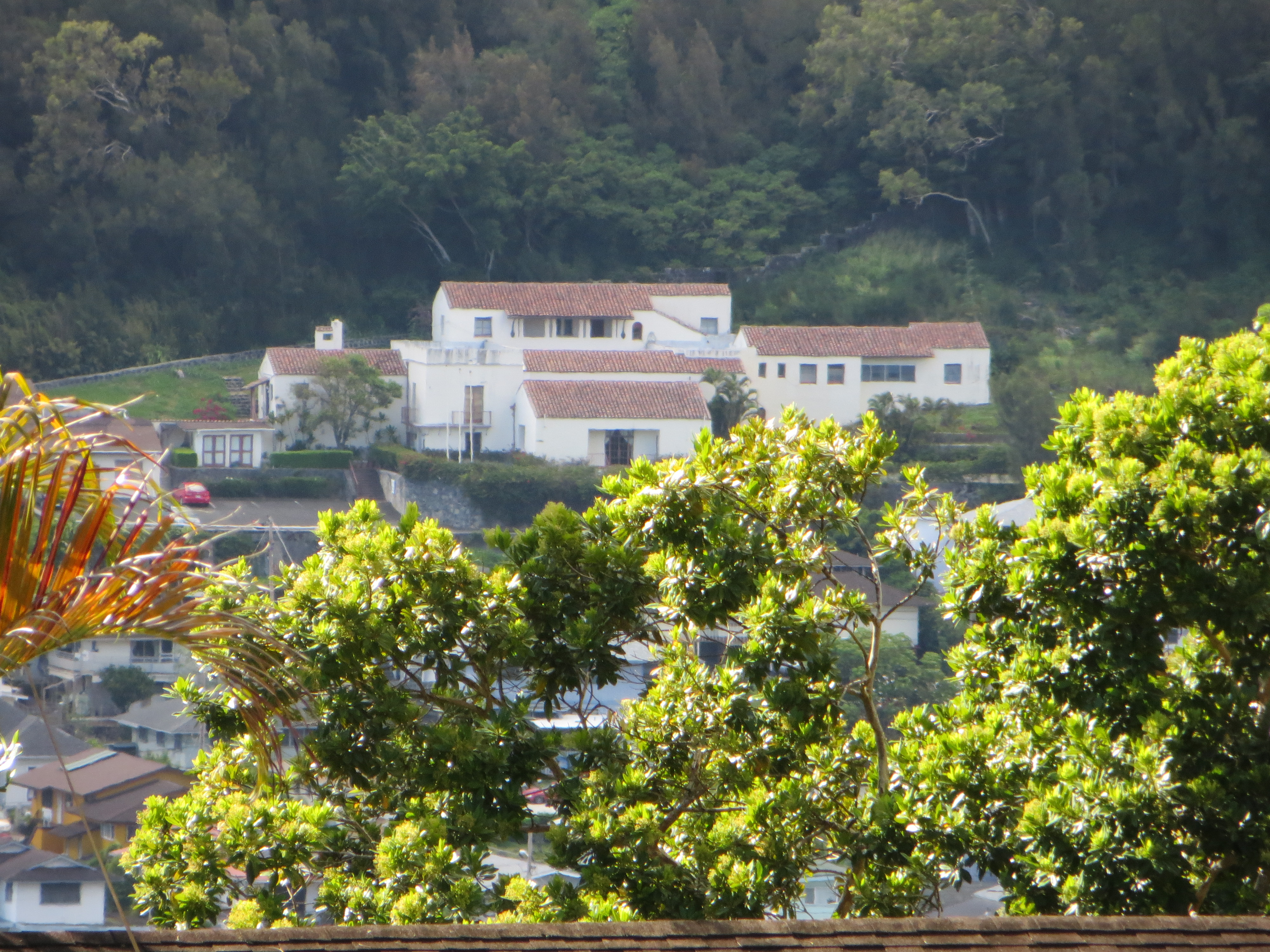
View from Pacific Heights
