= Hart Wood =

American architect

Hart Wood FAIA
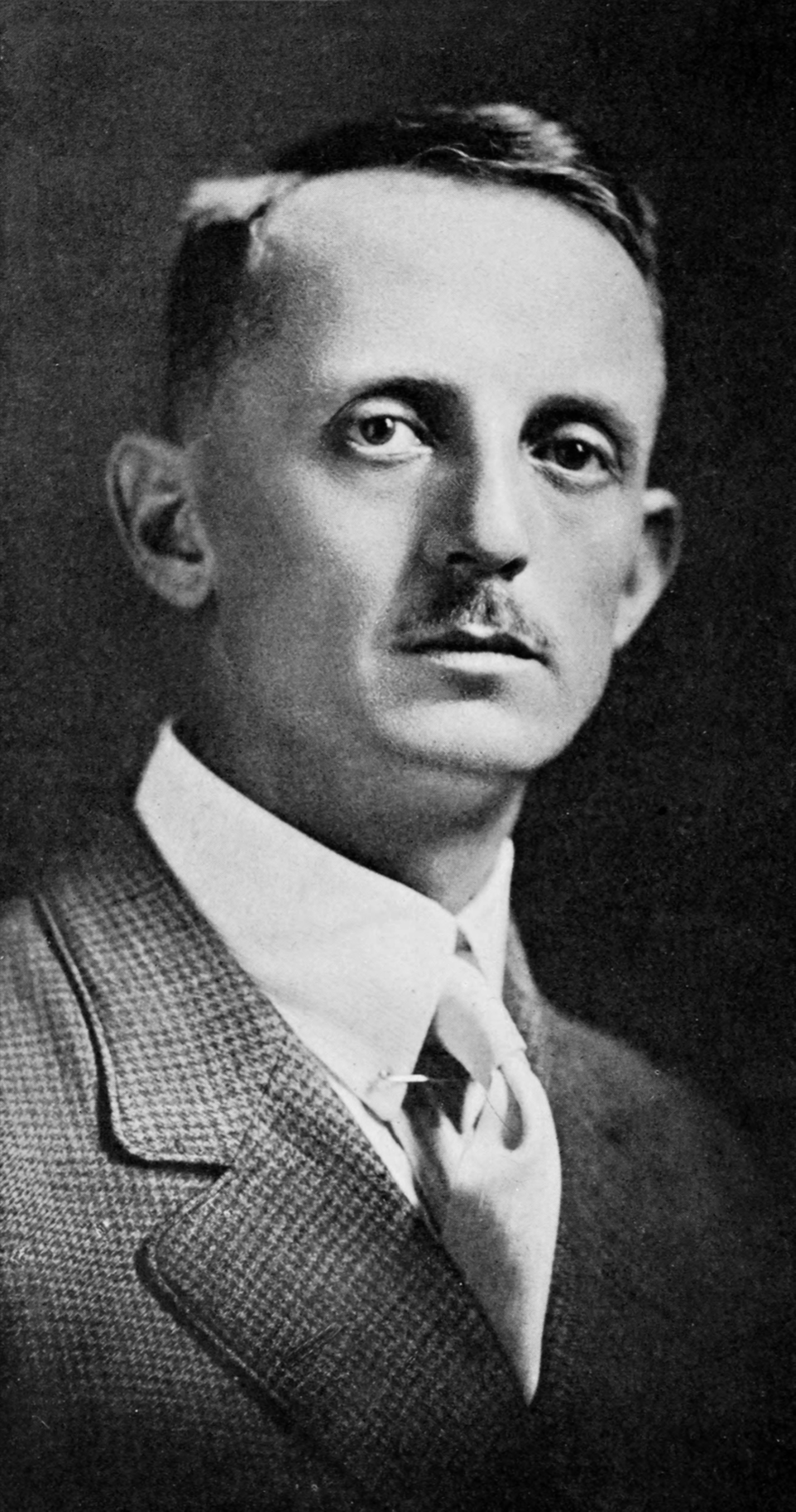
- Born: December 26, 1880; Philadelphia, Pennsylvania, U.S.
- Died: October 6, 1957 (aged 76); Honolulu, Territory of Hawaii
- Occupation: Architect
- Known for: Hawaiian architecture

Hart Wood FAIA (December 26, 1880 – October 6, 1957) was an American architect who flourished during the "Golden Age" of Hawaiian architecture. He was one of the principal proponents of a distinctive "Hawaiian style" of architecture appropriate to the local environment and reflective of the cultural heritage of the islands. He was one of the three founders (in 1926) of the Honolulu Chapter of the American Institute of Architects, and the only one of its fourteen charter members to be elected a Fellow of the AIA. He served as territorial architect during World War II.

== Early years ==
Hart Wood was born December 26, 1880, in Philadelphia, Pennsylvania. Hart's grandfather Samuel Wood, father Thomas Hart Benton Wood, and uncle Louis M. H. Wood were all in the building trades. His Uncle Louis had studied architecture at Cornell University, sought work in Chicago after the Great Fire of 1871, then settled in Kansas in 1873, working until 1887 with architect John G. Haskell, whose commissions included the Kansas State Capitol, Chase County Courthouse, and buildings for the University of Kansas, Washburn University, Haskell Institute, and federal schools for tribes in the neighboring Indian Territory. Thomas moved his family west in the early 1880s, settling for a time in Hays, Kansas. By 1890, both brothers had moved to a booming Denver, Colorado, awash with architects and civic art clubs and rapidly filling with Richardsonian Romanesque buildings downtown.

Hart began his architectural career in Denver, finding work in 1898 as a draftsman for the firm of Willis A. Marean and Albert J. Norton, who later designed the Colorado Governor's Mansion (1908). In 1900, he joined Frank E. Edbrooke & Company, who had designed the Brown Palace Hotel (1892). By 1902, he had moved to California, where he spent a year drafting plans for new campus building of Stanford University, where conservative Richardsonian Romanesque detail adorned newly evolving California Mission Revival Style architecture under the guidance of Boston-based Shepley, Rutan & Coolidge. At Stanford, he was also exposed to the landscape architecture of Frederick Law Olmsted. He then spent a year working for the young firm of Meyer and O'Brien before joining the firm of Bliss and Faville just in time to work on their most famous project, the St. Francis Hotel, and other major buildings arising from the ashes of the San Francisco earthquake of 1906, including the Neoclassical architecture of the Bank of California and the more Beaux-Arts style of the Union Savings Bank (1909), the Columbia (now Geary) Theater (1909), and the Masonic Temple (1912).

In 1904, he moved to the more rural East Bay area around Oakland, California, home to distinctive architects including Bernard Maybeck, known for designing individualistic rustic homes. Wood married Jessie Spangler on November 21, 1906, in Berkeley, California. In 1910, he founded the Oakland Architectural Club and served as its first president (1910–1912). Other members included John Galen Howard, Louis Christian Mullgardt, and Oswald Spier. In 1911 he became a licensed architect, no longer just a draftsman, and the following year designed his own home on a steep hillside in Piedmont, California, a modest but well-crafted, wood-shingled house with rustic features worthy of Maybeck, including porch columns of bark-sheathed redwood. Also in 1912 Bliss and Faville was chosen as one of five San Francisco architectural firms to work on the Panama–Pacific International Exposition. As their chief draftsman, Wood was heavily involved, especially in designing the exposition's landscaping and Great Wall. He also worked with John McLaren, the horticulturist who designed Golden Gate Park, on a unique long, towering fence frame covered with iceplants along the main entrance of the exposition.

The onset of World War I in 1914 severely reduced both new architectural commissions and access to high-quality European tools of the trade. Wood left Bliss and Faville to work briefly for another firm known for Beaux-Arts architecture, that of Lewis P. Hobart, before going into partnership with Horace G. Simpson in 1915. In between scarce commissions, the new partners published a series of articles in Architect and Engineer of California on planned communities of the kind envisioned by the Garden city movement. One article extolled the virtues of "English cottage" (Tudor Revival) styles for suburban living, a style they employed to good effect in designing houses and landscaping lots in the newly expanding suburb of Burlingame, California (billed as a "City of Trees") and in a wooded residential subdivision for its workers commissioned by Pacific Electric Metals Company of Bay Point, California, east of Berkeley. However, so little work was available during the war years that the two dissolved their partnership in 1917, and Wood worked in a shipyard to make ends meet.

== Hawaiʻi Years ==
Wood first arrived in Hawaiʻi in 1919, at the age of 38 and with a new partner he had met in Oakland: Charles William Dickey, who had secured two residential and two commercial commissions in Honolulu. Dickey had an architecture degree from MIT, and was grandson of William P. Alexander, an early missionary to Hawaiʻi. The partnership lasted until 1928 and produced many notable buildings, such as the Alexander & Baldwin Building (1929) and Honolulu Hale (1929)—the latter in collaboration with every other major architect in town.

Among his most striking designs are two churches. The First Church of Christ Scientist (1923), where he was a member, employs local materials, adapts some Hawaiian building techniques, and lies athwart cooling tradewinds in a shady tropical landscape. (He employed a similar design in 1922 for the main body of the Albert Spencer Wilcox Building in Lihue, completed in 1924.) The First Chinese Church of Christ (1929) artfully blends bell tower with pagoda, stained glass with colorful glazed tiles, and crosses with traditional Chinese geometric patterns. Similar Chinese motifs can also be seen in the work of other architects that Wood influenced, such as in J. Alvin Shadinger's interior design for the R.N. Linn House (1928).

Wood designed one of the first stores in Waikiki, the Gump Building (1929). Among the more notable of the many private residences he designed are those for Dr. James Morgan, Dr. Robert Faus (1924), Frederick Ohrt (1925), Georges de S. Canavarro (1926), and Robert Pew (whose house was known as "Wei Lan Tien") (1931).

Commissions from various sugarcane plantations helped keep him afloat during the Great Depression. On Kauaʻi he designed the Waimea Community Center (now Boys & Girls Clubhouse) (1933) and houses for the Waimea Plantation doctor and Kekaha Plantation skilled workers (1934). On Oʻahu he designed the Ewa Plantation administration building (1934), and on Lānaʻi the Dole Plantation manager's house (1936).

Frederick Ohrt became a regular client after being appointed head of the new Board of Water Supply in 1930. He hired Wood to design pumping stations at Pacific Heights (1933), Makiki (1935), and Kalihi Uka (1935); and an aerator in Nuʻuanu (1936). In fact, Wood's last major project was the Board of Water Supply Building (1958).

Many of the buildings he designed are on the State and National Register of Historic Places, including three of the Honolulu Tudor–French Norman Cottages built during 1923–1932. He died in Honolulu on October 6, 1957.

== Gallery ==
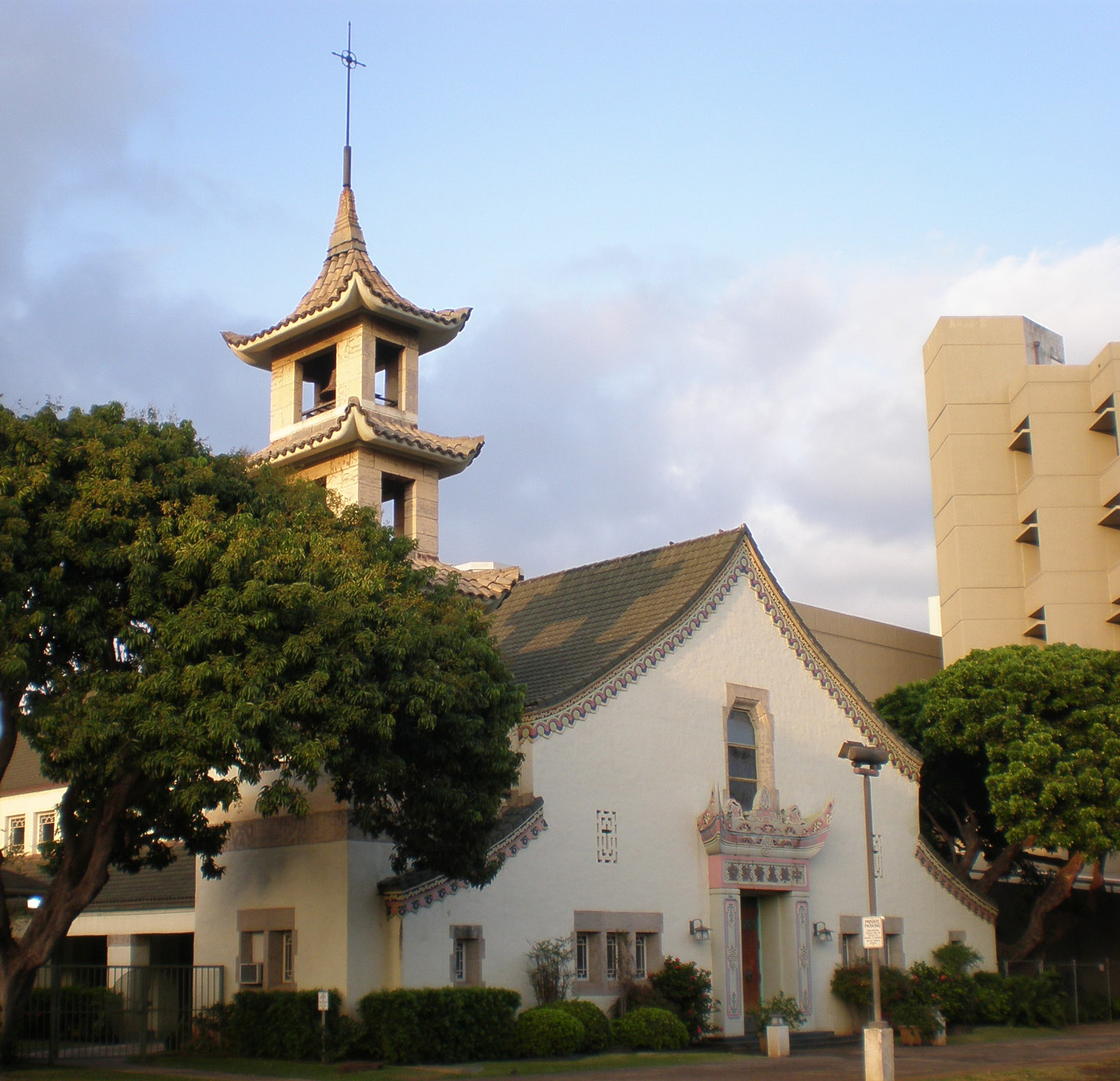
First Chinese Church of Christ, with pagoda bell tower, 1923

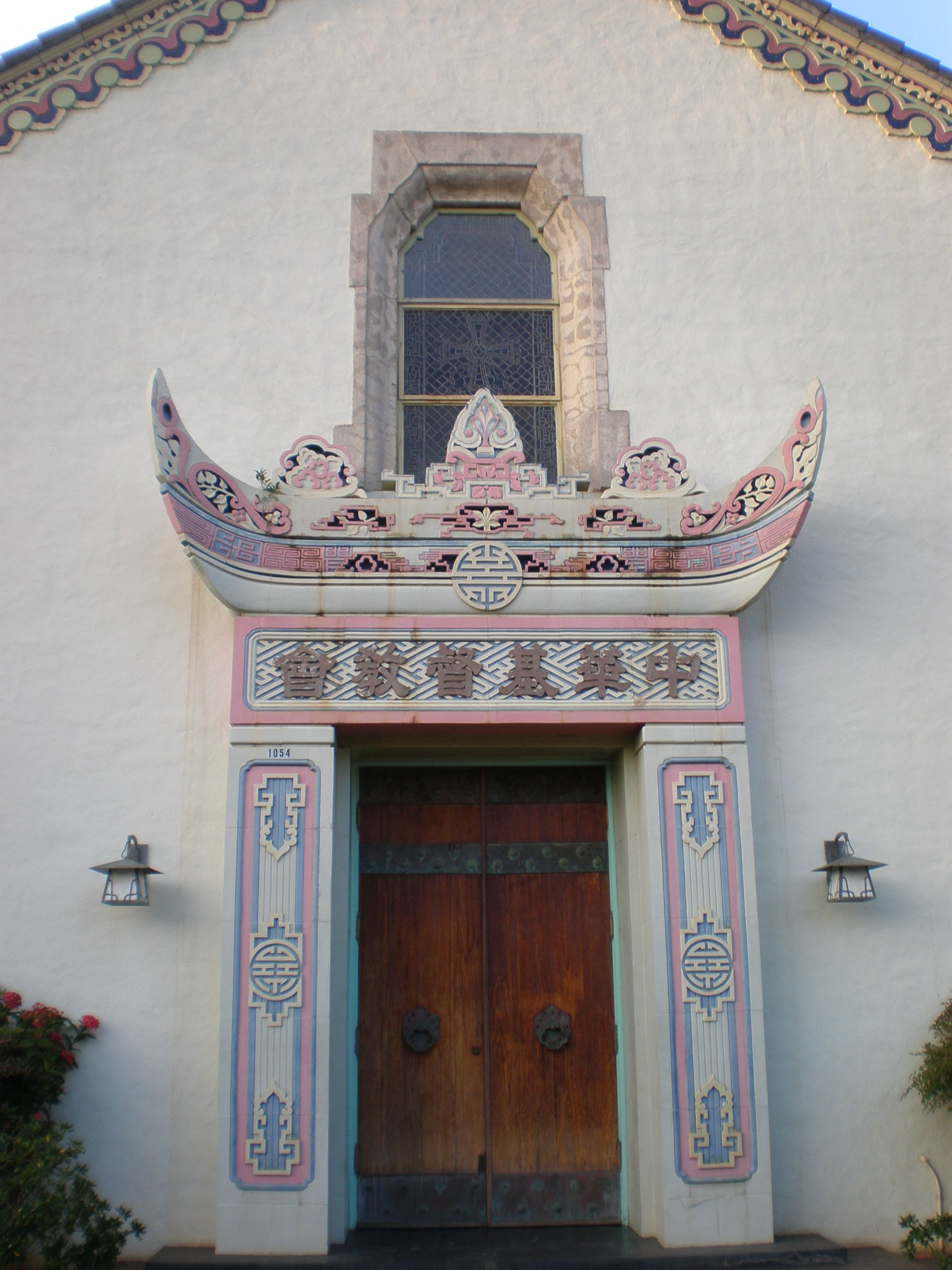
First Chinese Church of Christ, front doorway, 1923

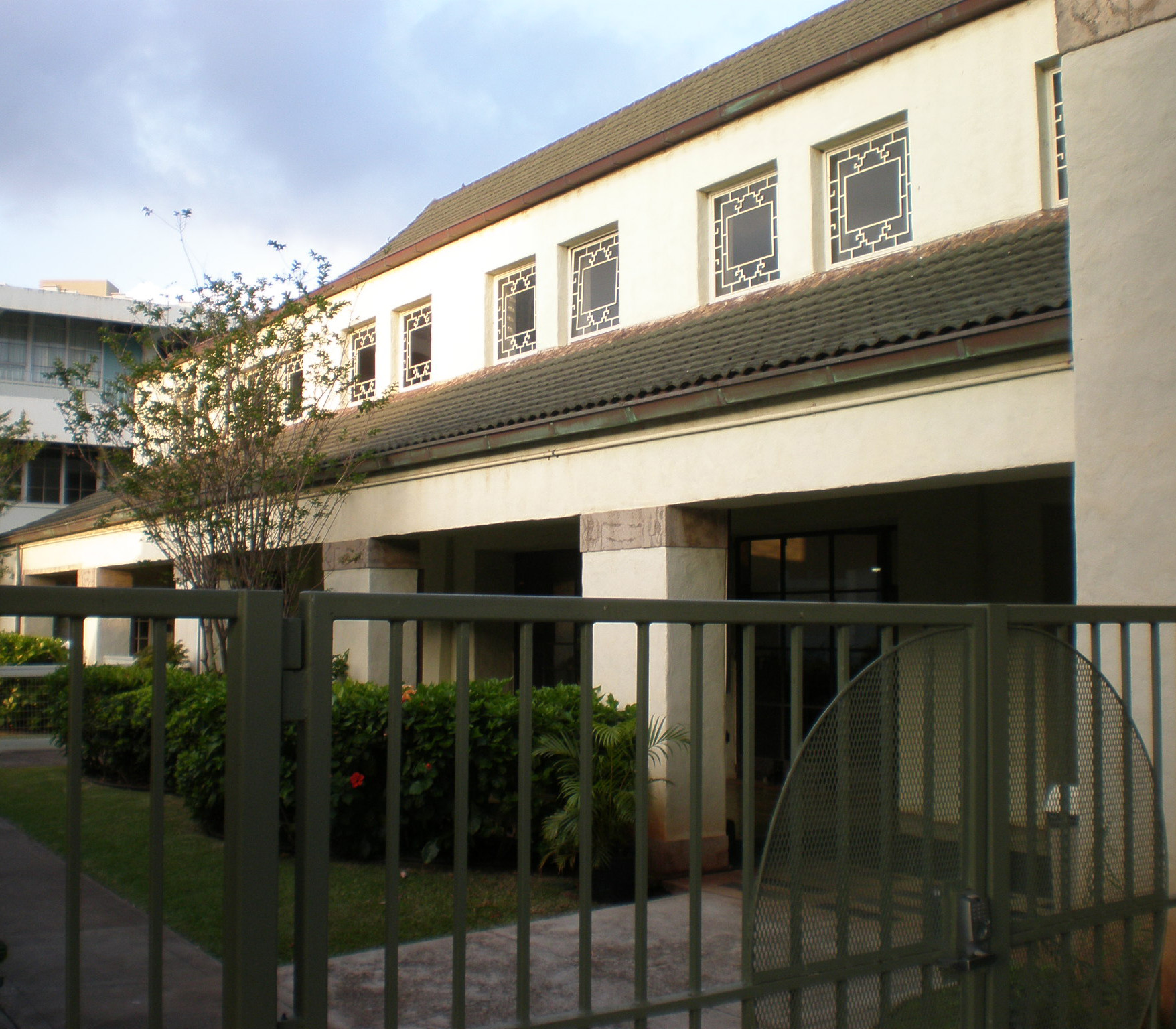
First Chinese Church of Christ, side verandah, 1923

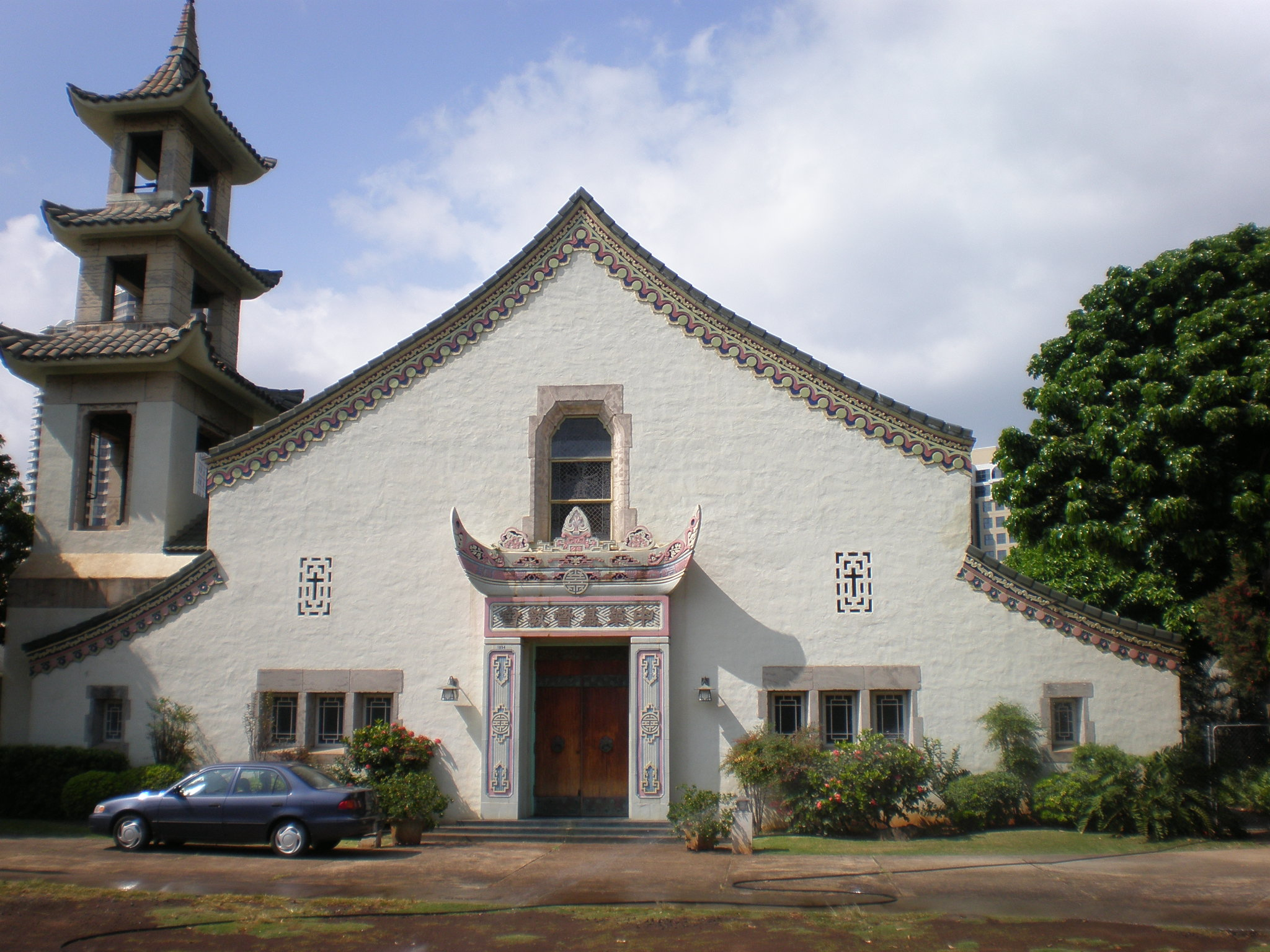
First Chinese Church of Christ, front face, 1923

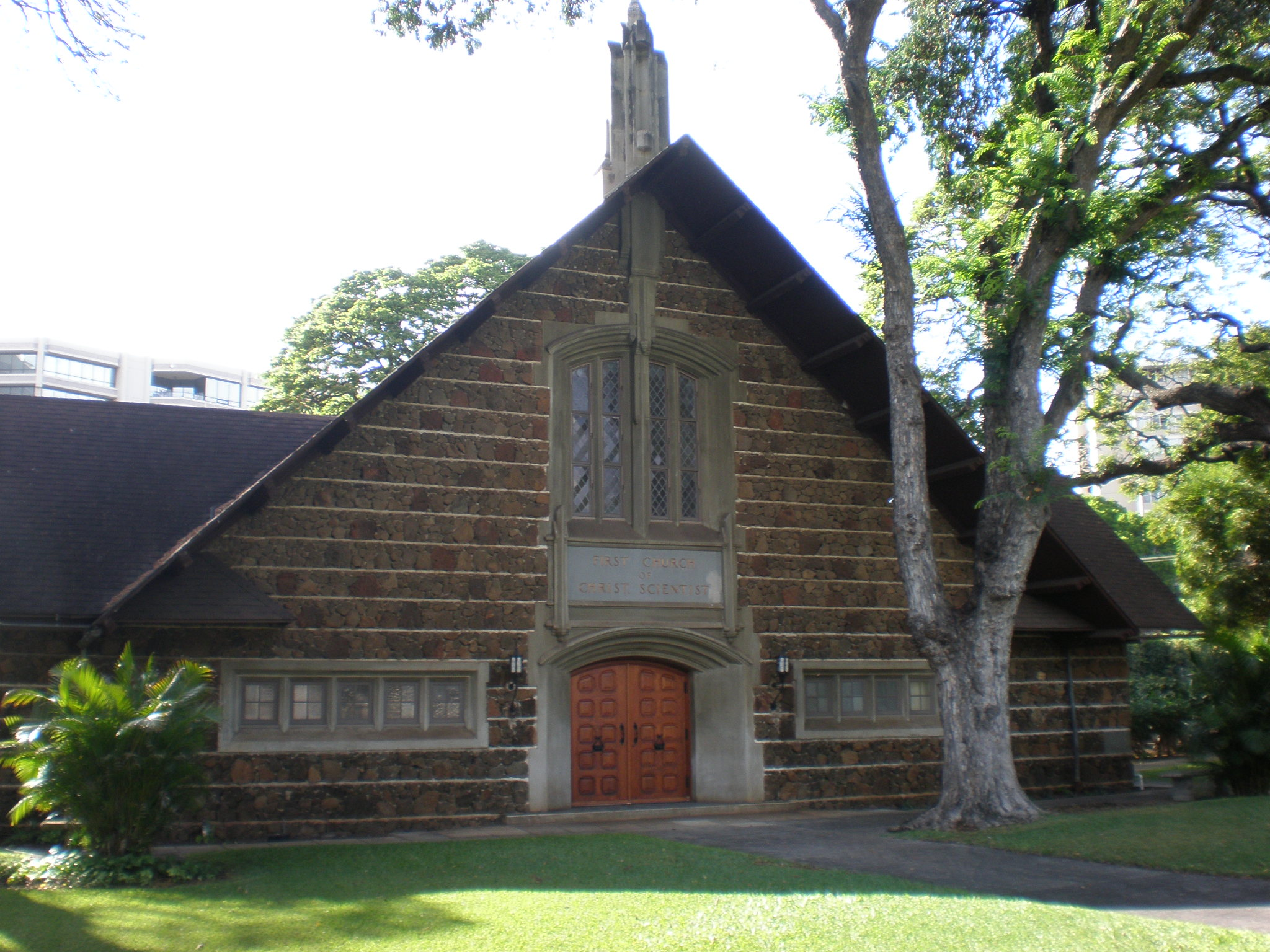
First Church of Christ Scientist, front, 1923

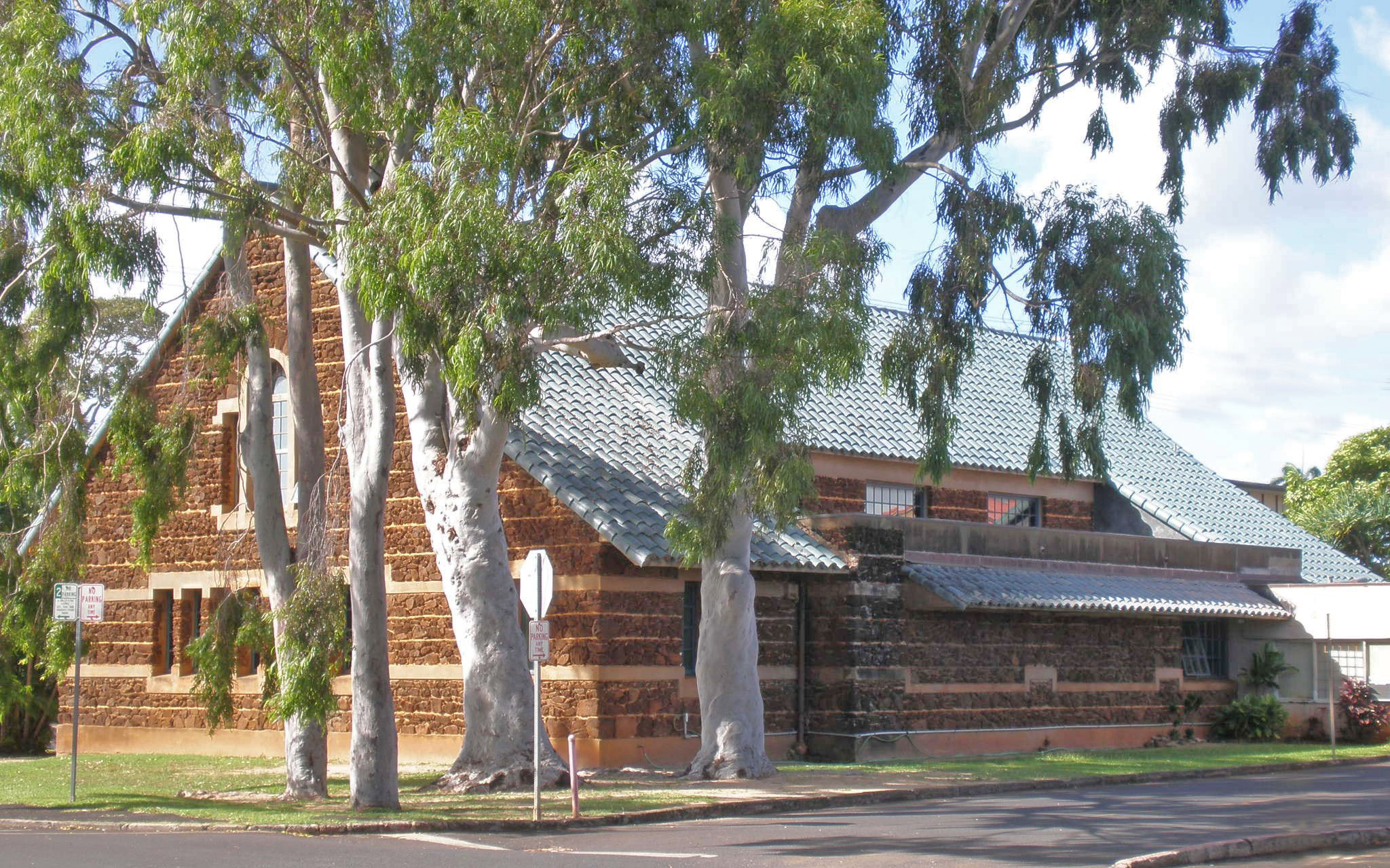
Albert Spencer Wilcox Building, 1924

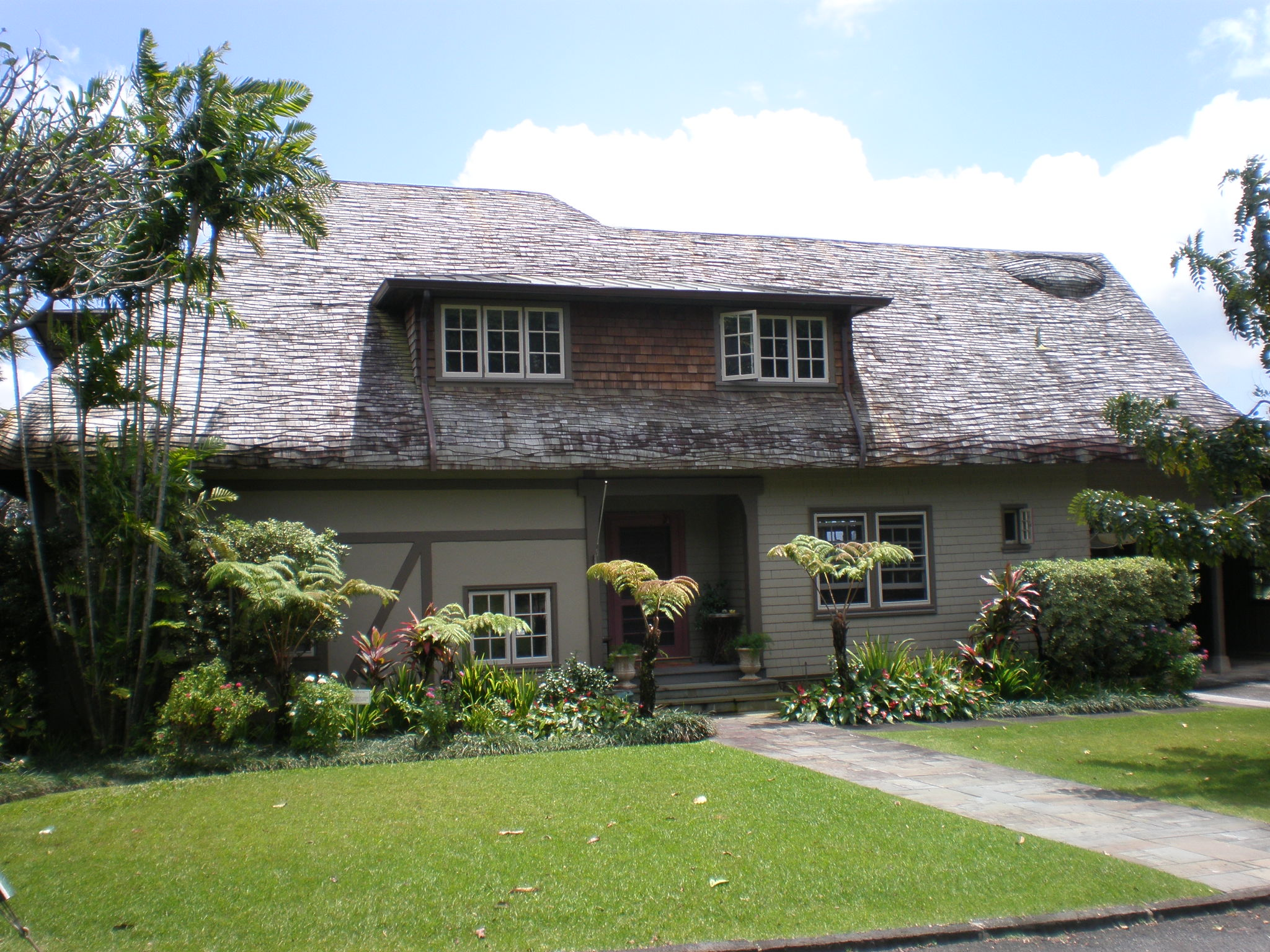
Dr. Robert Faus House, 1925

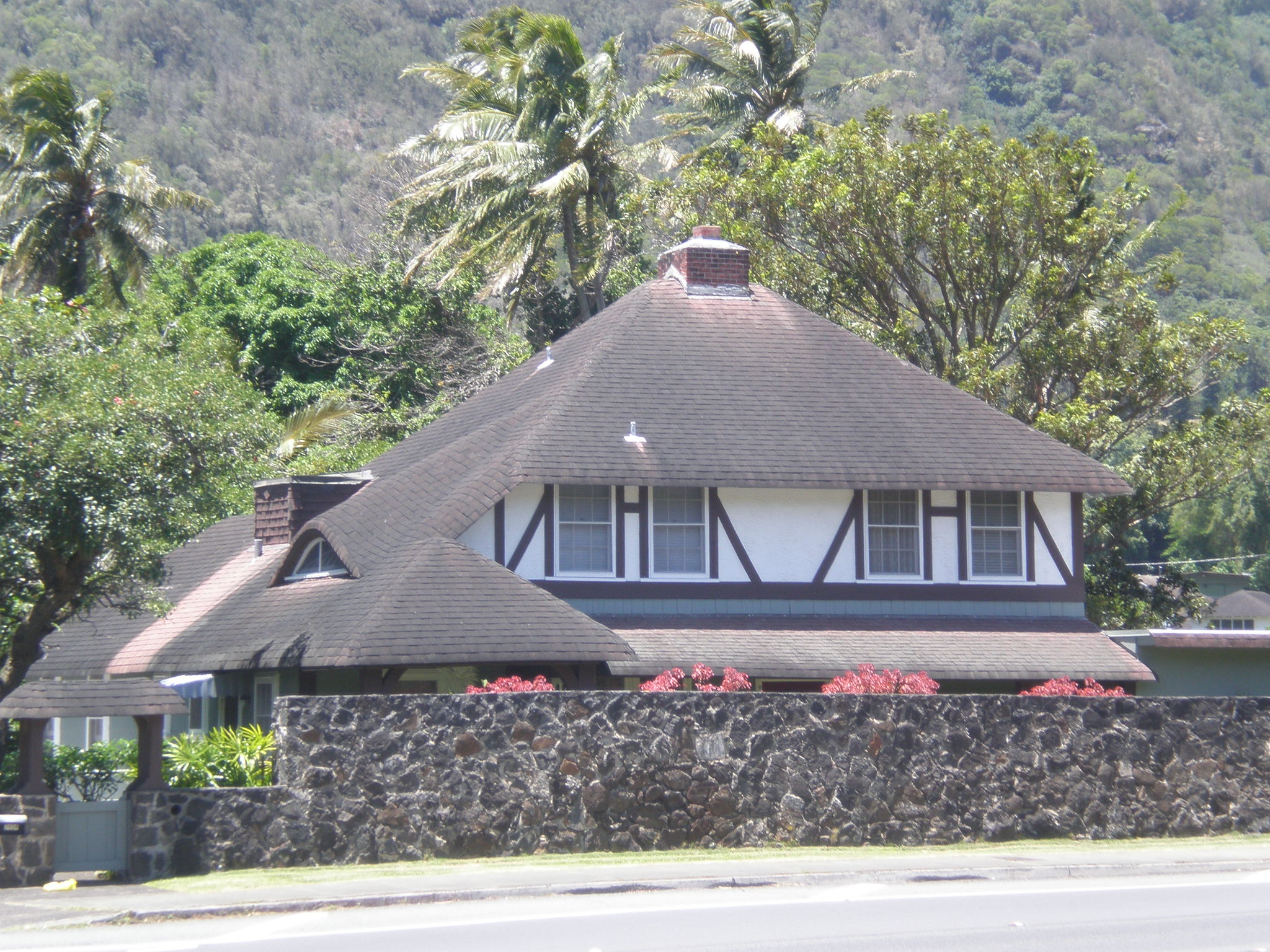
Frederick Ohrt House, 1925

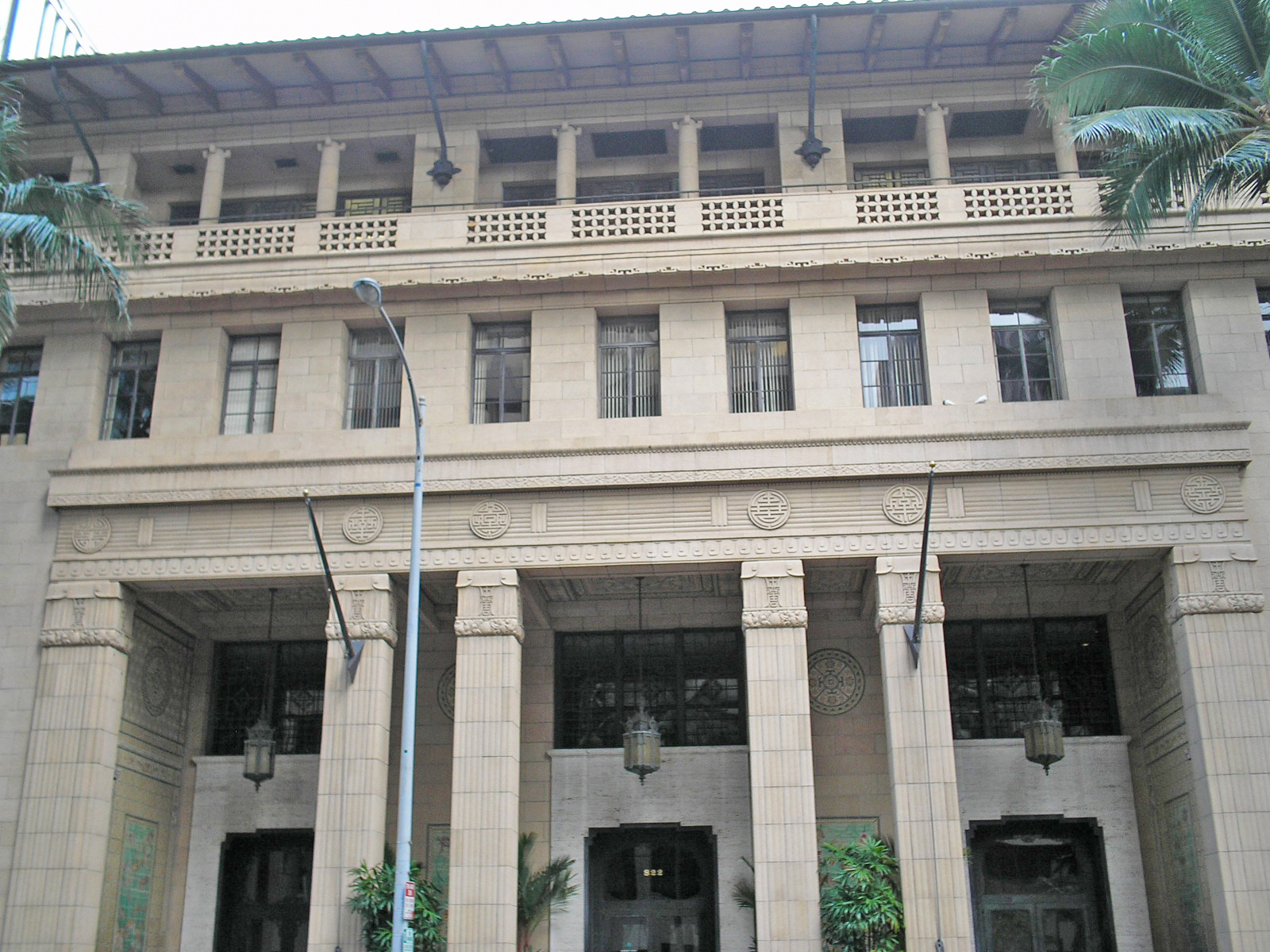
Alexander & Baldwin Building, 1929

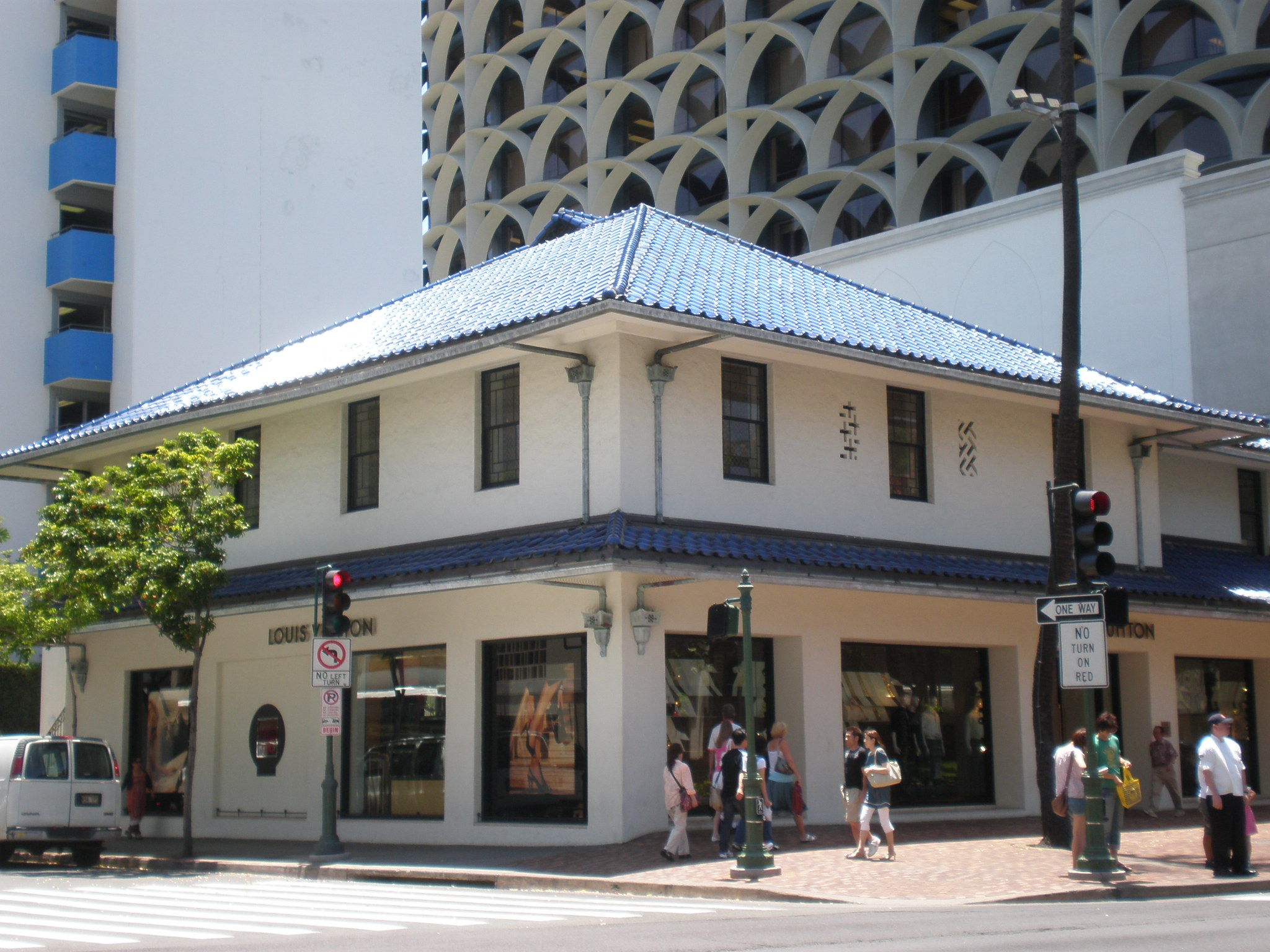
Gump Building, 1929

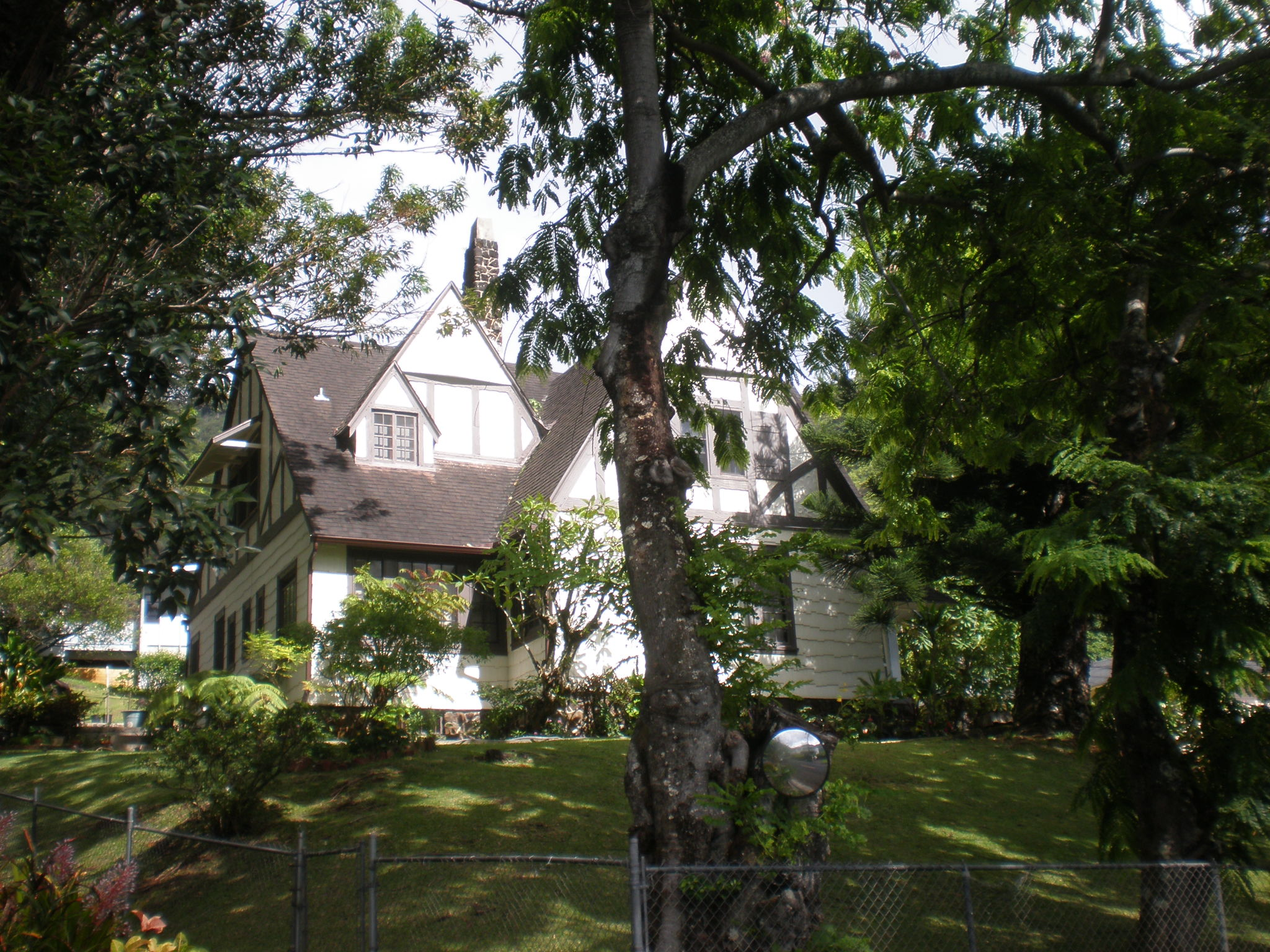
Lloyd Case House, 1930

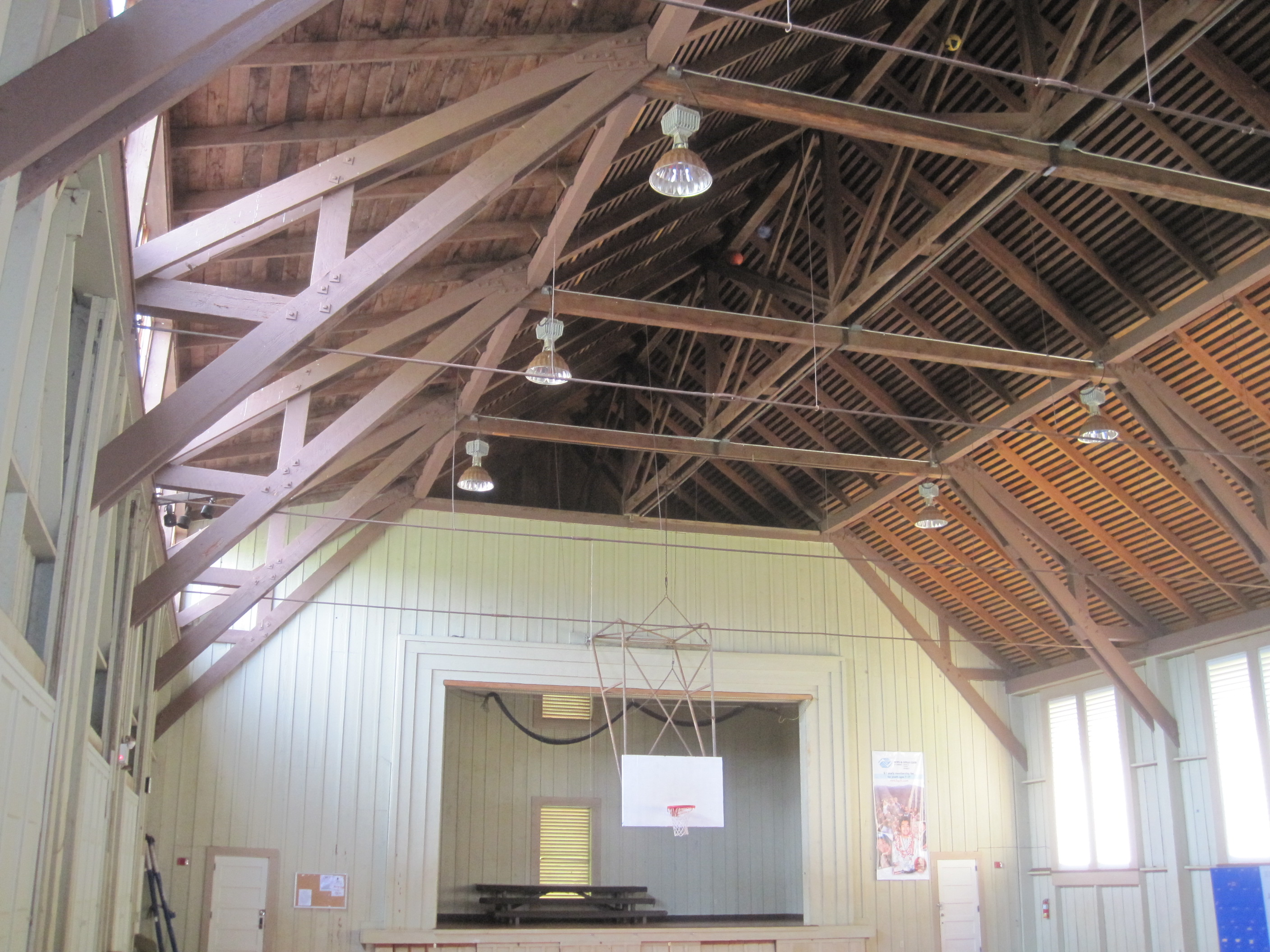
Interior of Waimea Community Center gymnasium, 1933

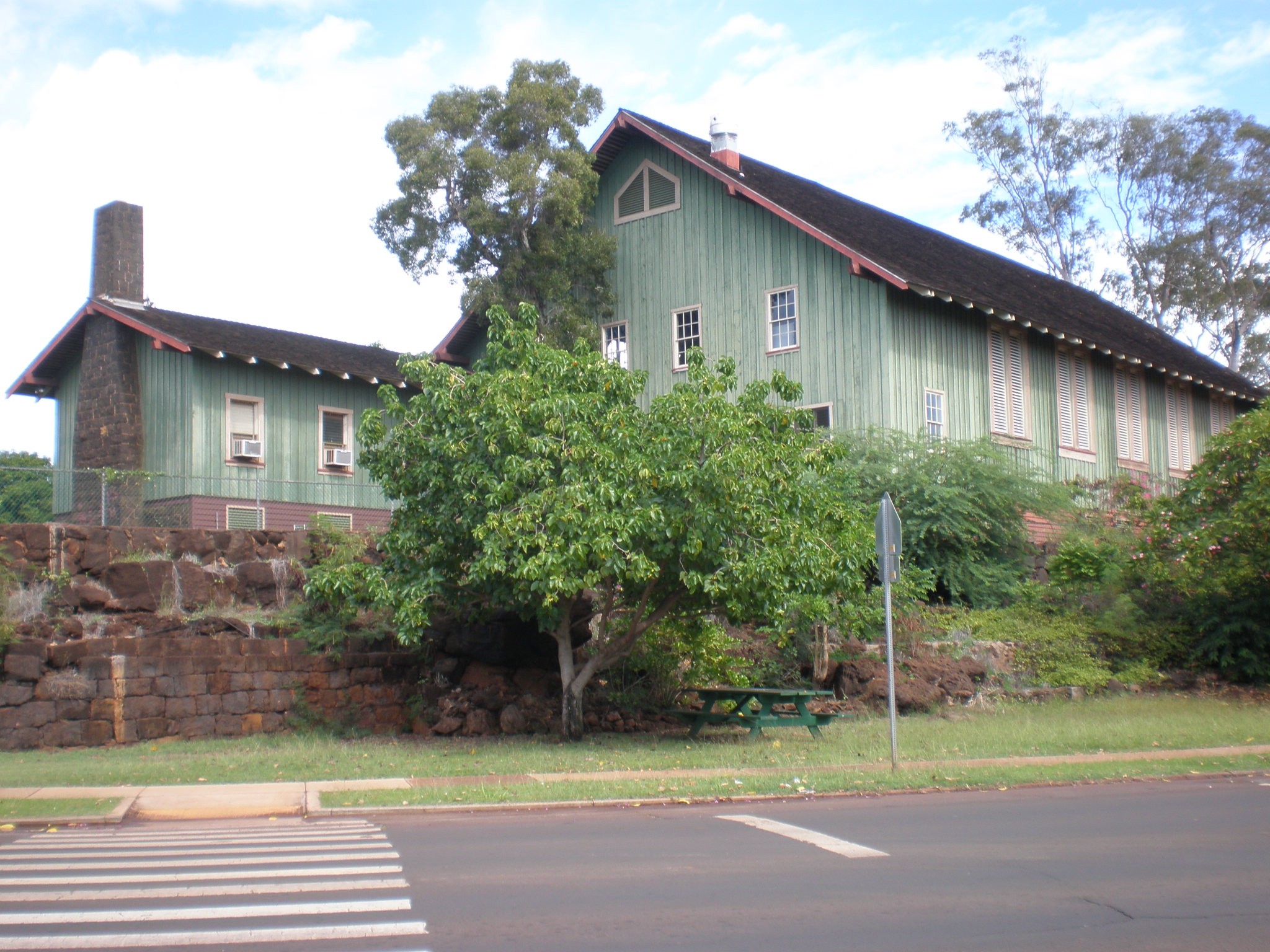
Exterior of Waimea Community Center buildings, 1933

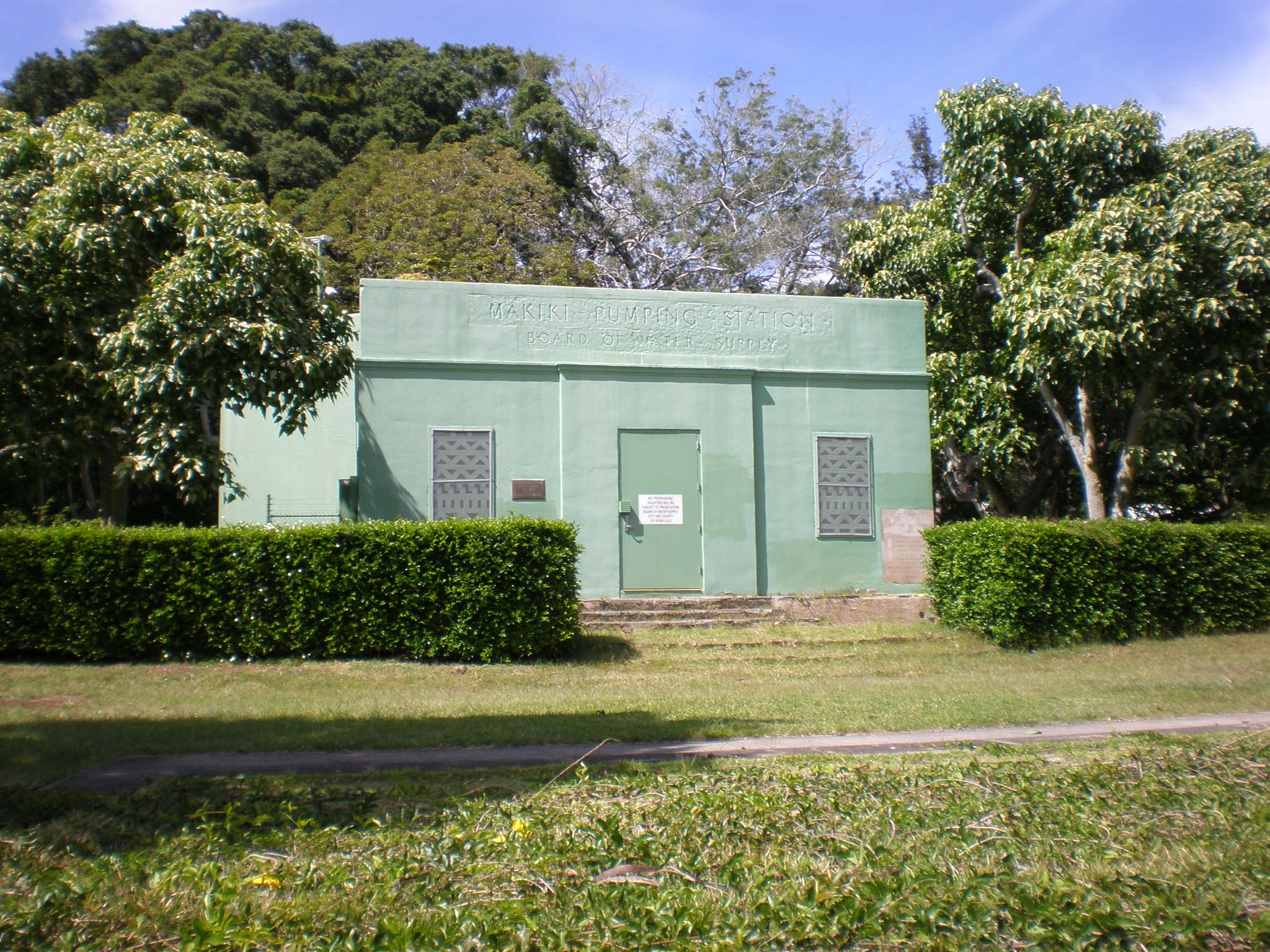
Makiki Pumping Station, 1934

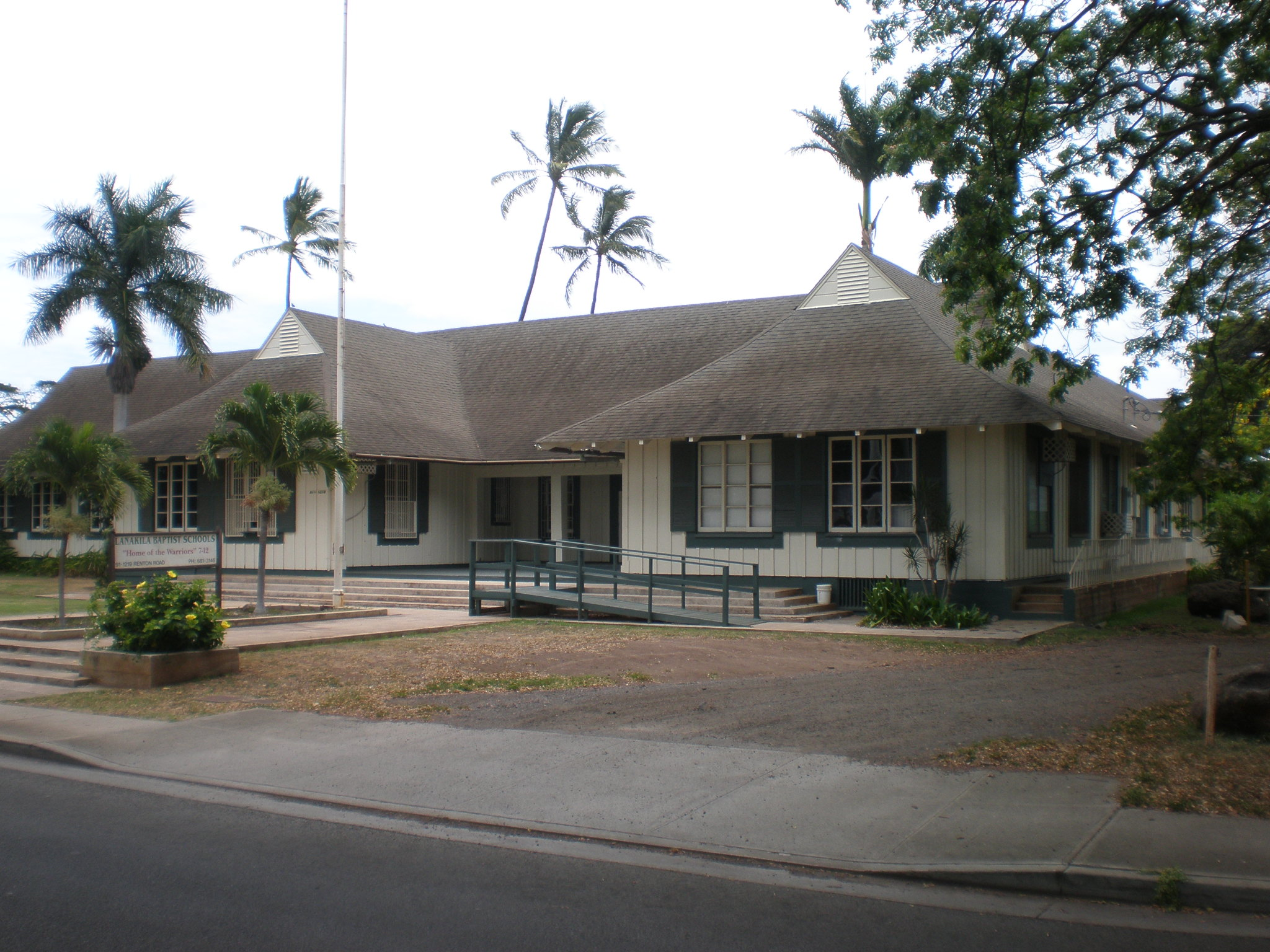
Ewa Plantation administration building, 1934

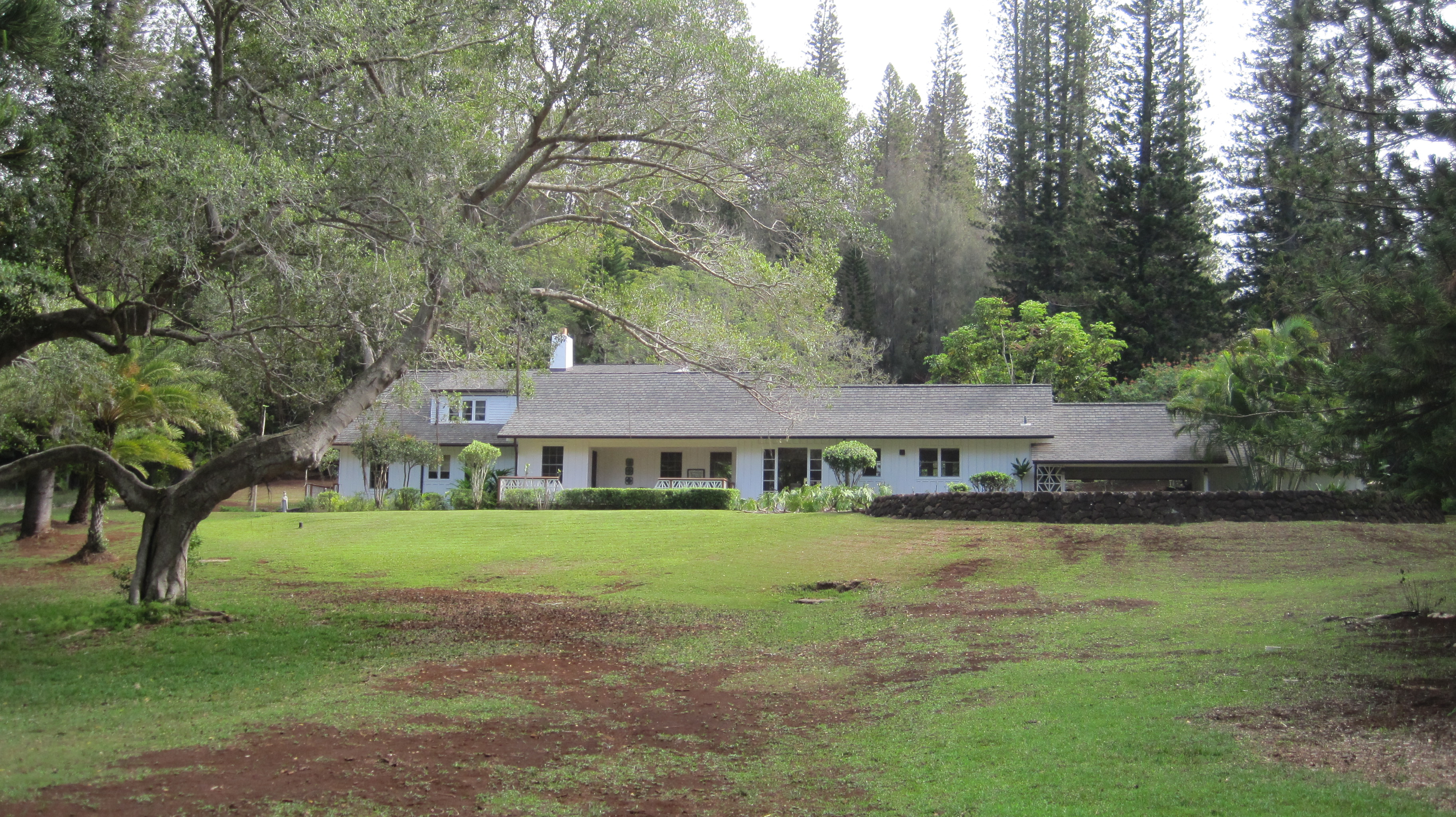
Dole Plantation manager's house, Lānaʻi City, 1936
