= Honolulu Tudor–French Norman Cottages =

Historic houses in Hawaii, United States

- Honolulu Tudor–French Norman Cottages TR
- U.S. National Register of Historic Places
- Location within Honolulu Location within Oahu Location within Hawaii
- Location: Honolulu, Hawaiʻi
- Built: 1923–1932
- Architectural style: Tudor Revival, Tudor-French Norman style
- MPS: Honolulu Tudor–French Norman Cottages TR
- NRHP reference No.: 64000146
- Added to NRHP: June 5, 1987

Honolulu Tudor—French Norman Cottages Thematic Group is a thematic resource or multiple property submission that describe fifteen Tudor or French Norman houses in Honolulu, Hawaiʻi. All these houses were listed on the National Register of Historic Places on June 5, 1987.

== History ==
During the boom years of the 1920s, as immigration and tourism to the Territory of Hawaiʻi from the West Coast of the United States increased sharply, many new private homes for the growing middle class showed the design influence of the California bungalows or Mock Tudor English cottages so popular in the Continental United States. One of the most influential architects in Honolulu, Hart Wood, had published a series of articles extolling the appropriateness of the English cottage style for suburban living. In 1920, he moved his practice from San Francisco to Honolulu, where he designed three of the fifteen exemplary English Tudor–French Norman Cottages built during 1923–1932 that were added to the National Register of Historic Places on 5 June 1987.

The Tudor features include asymmetrical, multilevel floor plans and projections, half-timber and stucco facades, small-paned casement windows, and roofs that are either high-pitched or rounded to resemble thatching. Although some of the same features mark grand Tudor mansions like the Charles M. Cooke, Jr., House, these cottages are much more modest structures of one to three stories, built of frame or masonry, with more playful or romantic elements evoking imagined "olde English" or French Norman antecedents. The interiors are designed to be cozy and intimate, with much more wall space than window openings, often with fireplaces and open-beam ceilings.

California regional styles also influenced new public buildings in the Territory. Spanish Colonial Revival and, more broadly, Mediterranean Revival architecture can be seen in Honolulu Hale, President William McKinley High School, the Fire Stations of Oahu, and numerous other public buildings erected during this period.

== Listed Properties ==
The following Honolulu properties were listed on the National Register of Historic Places on June 5, 1987:

Resource Name	Image	Address	Neighborhood	Builder/ Architect	Reference Number
Lloyd Case House		3581 Woodlawn Dr. 21°19′25″N 157°48′2″W	Mānoa	Hart Wood	86002829
Bartlett Cooper House		4850 Kahala Ave. 21°15′55″N 157°46′54″W	Kāhala		86002833
Carl H. Duhrsen House		3029 Felix St. 21°18′3″N 157°48′35″W	St. Louis Heights		86002834
Dr. Robert Faus House		2311 Ferdinand Ave. 21°18′47″N 157°49′35″W	Mānoa	Hart Wood	86002828
House at 3023 Kalakaua Avenue		3023 Kalakaua Avenue; 21°15′51″N 157°49′18″W	Waikīkī	Earl Williams	86002820
House at 3023A Kalakaua Avenue		3023A Kalakaua Avenue; 21°15′51″N 157°49′18″W	Waikīkī	Earl Williams	86002821
House at 3023B Kalakaua Avenue		3023B Kalakaua Avenue; 21°15′51″N 157°49′18″W	Waikīkī	Earl Williams	86002822
House at 3027 Kalakaua Avenue		3027 Kalakaua Avenue; 21°15′51″N 157°49′18″W	Waikīkī	Earl Williams	86002826
House at 3033 Kalakaua Avenue		3033 Kalakaua Avenue; 21°15′51″N 157°49′18″W	Waikīkī	Earl Williams	86002827
House at 3033B Kalakaua Avenue		3033B Kalakaua Avenue; 21°15′51″N 157°49′18″W	Waikīkī	Earl Williams	86002825
House at 4109 Black Point Road		4109 Black Point Road; 21°15′45″N 157°48′16″W			86002836
Frederick Ohrt House		2958 Pali Highway; 21°20′30″N 157°48′10″W	Nuʻuanu	Hart Wood	86002835
J. Alvin Shadinger House		4584 Kahala Avenue; 21°16′7″N 157°47′16″W	Kāhala	J. Alvin Shadinger	86002832
Charles A. Simpson House		4354 Kahala Avenue; 21°15′59″N 157°47′32″W	Kāhala	Theo Davies and Company	86002831
Frank Tavares House		2826 Coconut Avenue; 21°15′51″N 157°49′13″W	Waikīkī	John Morley	86002830
